= Under 19 Bayernliga =

- Founded: 1946 (Championship) 1974 (Bayernliga)
- Country: Germany
- Confederation: UEFA
- Number of clubs: 12
- Level on pyramid: 2
- Promotion to: Under 19 Bundesliga
- Relegation to: Landesliga Bayern-Süd Landesliga Bayern-Nord
- Current champions: SpVgg Unterhaching (2019–21)
- Most championships: 1. FC Nürnberg (26 titles)

The Under 19 Bayernliga (German: A-Jugend Bayernliga) is the second tier of under 19 youth football in Bavaria, set below the Under 19 Bundesliga South/Southwest.

Until 1996, the league was the highest tier of under 19 football, containing the youth teams of such clubs as FC Bayern Munich, TSV 1860 Munich and 1. FC Nürnberg.

== History ==
=== Pre-Bayernliga era ===
A Bavarian championship was played from 1946 onwards, only in 1952 and 1953 was it not held. Until 1971, the Bavarian champions advanced to the Southern German under 19 championship. This competition was disbanded after 1971 in light of the inception of a German championship from 1969 onwards.

The under 19 team of the 1. FC Nürnberg started a remarkable series from 1967 onwards, reaching the Bavarian final every year until 1994, 28 times in a row! Only in 1995 did Viktoria Aschaffenburg finish above the 1. FCN.

=== Bayernliga era ===
The Bayernliga was established in 1974, operating as two regional divisions, a northern and a southern one, the A-Jugend Bayernliga Nord and the A-Jugend Bayernliga Süd. The winner of each division would then advance to the Bavarian championship final, an on-off game. The winner of this game, the Bavarian champions, then advanced to the German under 19 championship.

In 1996, the Under 19 Regionalliga South was established, relegating the two Bayernligas to second division status. From now on, the best Bavarian clubs would play in the Regionalliga and the Bayernliga champions played for promotion to this league.

Since 2001, the final between the two league winners was now played in a home-and-away format. Should each team win a game the goals scored were not taken into consideration, instead, a penalty shoot-out was used to determine the winner.

In 2003, the Under 19 Regionalliga South and the Under 19 Regionalliga Southwest merged to form the Under 19 Bundesliga South/Southwest. This changed nothing in the status of the Bayernligas as second divisions.

In the 2007–08 season, the 1. FC Nürnberg remained unbeaten throughout its 26 league games but then lost in the finals to Unterhaching.

From the 2008–09 season, the Bayernliga now operates as a single division, allowing direct promotion for its champion. Below this league, two Landesligas, north and south, were slotted in above the seven Bezirksoberligas who previously formed the tier below. A final to determine the Bavarian champions will not be necessary any more.

In 2008, the Bavarian football association had 2,013 registered under 19 teams, a 3% increase from the previous year. All up, 20,699 junior teams were registered with the BFV in 2008

== Champions ==
=== Pre-Bayernliga era ===
Season	Winner	Finalist	Result
1945–46	**1. FC Nürnberg**	FC Bayern Munich	4–3
1946–47	**Germania Nürnberg**	ASN Pfeil Nürnberg	5–2
1947–48	**Germania Nürnberg**	FC Bayern Munich	1–2, 2–0, 2–2, 1–0 aet
1948–49	**TG Viktoria Augsburg**	SpVgg Fürth	1–0, 3–2
1949–50	**FC Bayern Munich**	1. FC Nürnberg	1–0, 2–2
1950–51	**TSV 1860 Munich**	FC Bayern Hof	1–0, 2–0
1951–52	not held	not held	N/A
1952–53	not held	not held	N/A
1953–54	**FC Bayern Munich**	TSV Straubing	4–2
1954–55	**BC Augsburg**	Viktoria Aschaffenburg	7–2
1955–56	**1. FC Nürnberg**	BC Augsburg	5–1
1956–57	**TSV 1860 Munich**	BC Augsburg	4–2
1957–58	**1. FC Nürnberg**	TSV 1860 Munich	3–1
1958–59	**BC Augsburg**	1. FC Nürnberg	3–2
1959–60	**1. FC Nürnberg**	FC Bayern Munich	3–1
1960–61	**1. FC Nürnberg**	1. FC Schweinfurt 05	2–0 aet
1961–62	**1. FC Nürnberg**	SpVgg Weiden	5–3
1962–63	**TSV 1860 Munich**	1. FC Nürnberg	2–1 aet
1963–64	**1. FC Nürnberg**	FC Bayern Munich	5–2
1964–65	**1. FC Nürnberg**	MTV Ingolstadt	3–2
1965–66	**FC Bayern Munich**	1. FC Schweinfurt 05	7–1
1966–67	**1. FC Nürnberg**	FV Würzburg 04	5–2
1967–68	**1. FC Nürnberg**	1. FC Schweinfurt 05	3–1
1968–69	**1. FC Nürnberg**	TSV 1860 Munich	1–0
1969–70	**1. FC Nürnberg**	TSV 1860 Munich	3–1
1970–71	**1. FC Nürnberg**	FC Vilshofen	9–0
1971–72	**FC Bayern Munich**	1. FC Nürnberg	2–1 aet
1972–73	**FC Bayern Munich**	1. FC Nürnberg	2–1
1973–74	**1. FC Nürnberg**	TSV Straubing	5–0

=== Bayernliga era ===
Season	North	South	Result
1974–75	**1. FC Nürnberg**	FC Vilshofen	2–1 aet
1975–76	**1. FC Nürnberg**	FC Augsburg	0–0, 1–1 / 11–10 after pen.
1976–77	**1. FC Nürnberg**	TSV 1860 Munich	2–1
1977–78	1. FC Nürnberg	**FC Augsburg**	0–1
1978–79	**1. FC Nürnberg**	FC Augsburg	5–2
1979–80	**1. FC Nürnberg**	FC Bayern Munich	4–0
1980–81	1. FC Nürnberg	**FC Bayern Munich**	1–2
1981–82	1. FC Nürnberg	**TSV 1860 Munich**	1–2
1982–83	1. FC Nürnberg	**TSV 1860 Munich**	3–4 aet
1983–84	**1. FC Nürnberg**	TSV 1860 Munich	1–1 / 7–6 after pen.
1984–85	1. FC Nürnberg	**FC Bayern Munich**	1–4 aet
1985–86	**1. FC Nürnberg**	TSV 1860 Munich	2–0
1986–87	1. FC Nürnberg	**FC Bayern Munich**	1–1 / 3–5 after pen.
1987–88	1. FC Nürnberg	**TSV 1860 Munich**	1–1 / 2–4 after pen.
1988–89	**1. FC Nürnberg**	FC Augsburg	6–0
1989–90	1. FC Nürnberg	**FC Augsburg**	3–6 aet
1990–91	1. FC Nürnberg	**FC Bayern Munich**	1–2 aet
1991–92	1. FC Nürnberg	**FC Bayern Munich**	0–4
1992–93	1. FC Nürnberg	**FC Augsburg**	1–2 aet
1993–94	1. FC Nürnberg	**FC Bayern Munich**	2–4
1994–95	Viktoria Aschaffenburg	**FC Bayern Munich**	0–5
1995–96	1. FC Nürnberg	**FC Bayern Munich**	0–4
1996–97	SpVgg Bayreuth	**FC Augsburg**	1–2
1997–98	SpVgg Greuther Fürth	**TSV 1860 Munich II**	1–2
1998–99	**1. FC Nürnberg**	FC Bayern Munich II	6–5 after pen.
1999–2000	1. FC Nürnberg	MTV Ingolstadt	not held
2000–01	**1. FC Schweinfurt 05**	MTV Ingolstadt	3–0, 5–1
2001–02	**1. FC Nürnberg**	TSV Waldkirchen	4–0, 4–2
2002–03	**SpVgg Greuther Fürth**	FC Memmingen	4–0, 1–2 / 2–4 after pen.
2003–04	Viktoria Aschaffenburg	**SpVgg Unterhaching**	0–1, 2–2
2004–05	**Jahn Regensburg**	FC Augsburg	1–0, 1–1
2005–06	1. FC Bamberg	**SV Wacker Burghausen**	0–1, 0–2
2006–07	**Jahn Regensburg**	SpVgg Unterhaching	1–1, 2–1
2007–08	1. FC Nürnberg	**SpVgg Unterhaching**	0–1, 1–1

From 2008 onwards, no final was played anymore:

Season	Champions	Runners–up
2008–09	1. FC Nürnberg	FC Augsburg
2009–10	FC Augsburg	SpVgg Unterhaching
2010–11	SpVgg Unterhaching	SV Wacker Burghausen
2011–12	FC Augsburg	FC Ingolstadt 04
2012–13	Wacker Burghausen	Jahn Regensburg
2013–14	1. FC Nürnberg	FC Ingolstadt 04
2014–15	FC Ingolstadt 04	SpVgg Unterhaching
2015–16	FC Augsburg	SpVgg Unterhaching
2016–17	SpVgg Unterhaching	FC Deisenhofen
2017–18	FC Ingolstadt 04	Würzburger Kickers
2018–19	SpVgg Greuther Fürth	SpVgg Unterhaching
2019–21	SpVgg Unterhaching	1. FC Schweinfurt 05
2022–23	SpVgg Greuther Fürth	Jahn Regensburg
2023–24	SpVgg Unterhaching	FC Memmingen
2024–25	1. FC Schweinfurt 05	Viktoria Aschaffenburg

- Bavarian champions in **bold**
- Source: Siegerliste der Bayerischen Meisterschaften U19 (A)-Junioren (in German), accessed: 28 November 2008

=== Winners & Finalists ===
As of 2024, this is the standing in the all-time winners list:

Club	Championships	Finals
1. FC Nürnberg	26	44
FC Bayern Munich	13	18
TSV 1860 Munich	7	13
FC Augsburg	7	8
SpVgg Unterhaching	6	5
SpVgg Greuther Fürth	3	3
1. FC Schweinfurt 05	2	5
BC Augsburg	2	4
Jahn Regensburg	2	2
Germania Nürnberg	2	2
SV Wacker Burghausen	2	1
FC Ingolstadt 04	2	0
TG Viktoria Augsburg	1	1
Viktoria Aschaffenburg	0	3
MTV Ingolstadt	0	3
FC Vilshofen	0	2
TSV Straubing	0	2
1. FC Bamberg	0	1
FC Memmingen	0	1
TSV Waldkirchen	0	1
SpVgg Bayreuth	0	1
FV Würzburg 04	0	1
SpVgg Weiden	0	1
FC Bayern Hof	0	1
ASN Pfeil Nürnberg	0	1
FC Deisenhofen	0	1
Würzburger Kickers	0	1

== National success ==
On Southern German and national level, the Bavarian clubs achieved the following success:

=== German championship ===
The German under 19 championship was incepted in 1969 and, as of 2019, Bavarian clubs have reached the final 15 times, winning it five times.

Season	Winner	Finalist	Result
1970–71	1. FC Köln	1. FC Nürnberg	3–1
1973–74	1. FC Nürnberg	1. FC Köln	1–0
1978–79	Stuttgarter Kickers	1. FC Nürnberg	2–1
1985–86	Bayer Leverkusen	1. FC Nürnberg	2–0
1988–89	VfB Stuttgart	1. FC Nürnberg	3–2
1992–93	FC Augsburg	1. FC Kaiserslautern	3–1
1996–97	Borussia Dortmund	TSV 1860 Munich	2–1
1997–98	Borussia Dortmund	FC Bayern Munich	2–2 / 2–1 after pen.
2000–01	FC Bayern Munich	Bayer Leverkusen	3–2
2001–02	FC Bayern Munich	VfB Stuttgart	4–0
2003–04	FC Bayern Munich	VfL Bochum	3–0
2005–06	FC Schalke 04	FC Bayern Munich	2–1
2006–07	Bayer Leverkusen	FC Bayern Munich	2–1 aet
2011–12	FC Schalke 04	FC Bayern Munich	2–1
2016–17	Borussia Dortmund	FC Bayern Munich	0–0 / 8–7 after pen.

- Winner in **bold**.
- Source: Alle A–Junioren–Meister (in German) official DFB website: List of all champions, accessed: 28 November 2008

=== Southern German championship ===
The Under 19 Southern German championship was incepted in 1946 and disbanded in 1973. Bavarian clubs have won the competition 11 times.

Season	Winner
1947–48	Germania Nürnberg
1948–49	TG Viktoria Augsburg
1949–50	FC Bayern Munich
1953–54	FC Bayern Munich
1955–56	1. FC Nürnberg
1957–58	1. FC Nürnberg
1959–60	1. FC Nürnberg
1962–63	TSV 1860 Munich
1963–64	1. FC Nürnberg
1964–65	1. FC Nürnberg
1970–71	1. FC Nürnberg

- Source: 50 Jahre Bayerischer Fussball Verband (in German) publisher: Bavarian FA, published: 1996, page 131, accessed: 28 November 2008

=== German Cup ===
The German under 19 cup competition was incepted in 1987 and Bavarian clubs played in the final nine times without having lost one, as of 2008. Originally, the competition was designed for the league runners–up, this was later changed and nowadays, the 21 regional cup winners qualify for it. Since 2001, a Bavarian Cup competition for the under 19 is played.

Season	Winner	Finalist	Result
1987	1. FC Nürnberg	Borussia Mönchengladbach	2–1
1988	1. FC Nürnberg	Borussia Mönchengladbach	1–0
1991	FC Augsburg	1. FC Köln	3–2
1992	FC Augsburg	Eintracht Braunschweig	1–1 / 6–5 after pen.
1993	1. FC Nürnberg	FC Schalke 04	2–1
1994	FC Augsburg	1. FC Köln	2–1
1995	FC Augsburg	FC Berlin	4–2
2000	TSV 1860 Munich	Hamburger SV	2–1
2007	TSV 1860 Munich	VfL Wolfsburg	2–1

- Winner in **bold**.
- Source: Alle Junioren–Vereinspokalsieger (in German) DFB website, accessed: 28 November 2008

== Bavarian under 19 cup ==
The Bavarian under 19 cup functions as a qualifying competition for the German under 19 cup and was incepted in 2001.

Season	Winner	Finalist	Result
2001	Viktoria Aschaffenburg	FC Augsburg	1–0
2002	FC Augsburg	SG Post/Süd Regensburg	1–0
2003	FC Memmingen	1. SC Feucht	14–0
2004	TSV Eintracht Bamberg	no final, tournament played instead	
2005	1. FC Nürnberg	DJK Vilzing	8–0
2006	TSV 1860 Munich	1. SC Feucht	2–1
2007	TSV 1860 Munich	SC 04 Schwabach	5–0
2008	1. FC Nürnberg	1. FC Eintracht Bamberg	5–4 after pen.
2009	FC Augsburg	SpVgg Ansbach	1–0
2010	SpVgg Greuther Fürth	no final, tournament played instead	
2011	1. FC Nürnberg	no final, tournament played instead	
2012	1. FC Nürnberg	SpVgg Unterhaching	4–2
2013	Wacker Burghausen	Würzburger Kickers	2–0
2014	TSV 1860 Munich	1. FC Nürnberg	2–1
2015	SpVgg Greuther Fürth	Baiersdorfer SV	3–1
2016	FC Ingolstadt 04	TSV 1860 Munich	2–0
2017	FC Ingolstadt 04	ASV Neumarkt	3–1
2018	1. FC Nürnberg	FC Ismaning	4–0
2019	SSV Jahn Regensburg	SV Wacker Burghausen	4–0

== League placings since 2003–04 ==
=== State-wide league ===
The placings in the league since 2008–09, when it moved to a single-division format:

Club	09	10	11	12	13	14	15	16	17	18	19
1. FC Nürnberg	1	BL	BL	BL	BL	1	BL	BL	BL	BL	BL
FC Ingolstadt 04		5	4	2	4	2	1	BL	BL	1	BL
FC Augsburg	2	1	BL	1	BL	BL	BL	1	BL	BL	BL
SpVgg Greuther Fürth											1
SpVgg Unterhaching	BL	2	1	BL	BL	BL	2	2	1	BL	2
TSV 1860 Munich										3	3
Jahn Regensburg	BL	BL	5	9	2	4	4	9	4	6	4
SpVgg Ansbach	5	8	9	3	9	11					5
FC Deisenhofen							6	5	2	10	6
Würzburger Kickers								6	6	2	7
FV Illertissen									5	5	8
SV Wacker Burghausen	4	4	2	5	1	BL	5	4	8	8	9
1. FC Schweinfurt 05	6	11				6	10		7	11	10
FC Memmingen	7	6	6	4	6	8	9	3	3	4	11
SpVgg Landshut									9	9	12
ASV Neumarkt											13
SpVgg Bayern Hof											14
FC Ismaning										7	15
FC Gundelfingen											16
SG Quelle Fürth		3	3	8	3	3	3	11		12	
SG 83 Nürnberg-Fürth									10		
TSV 1861 Nördlingen								7	11		
Viktoria Aschaffenburg	8	7	12				8	8	12		
FSV Erlangen-Bruck	10			7	8	5	7	10			
Baiersdorfer SV								12			
SK Lauf						9	11				
SV Memmelsdorf					5	7	12				
FC Stätzling						10					
TSV 1860 Rosenheim			7	10	7	12					
TSV Aindling					10						
Würzburger FV		9	10		11						
FC Dingolfing	9	12			12						
SpVgg Unterhaching II				6							
TSG Thannhausen			8	11							
SC Fürstenfeldbruck				12							
SC 04 Schwabach	12		11								
1. FC Eintracht Bamberg	3	10									
SC Eintracht Freising	11										

=== Northern and southern divisions ===
The placings in the northern and southern division until 2007–08, when they were abolished:

North	04	05	06	07	08
Jahn Regensburg	2	1	BL	1	BL
1. FC Nürnberg	BL	BL	BL	BL	1
Viktoria Aschaffenburg	1	5	4	7	2
1. FC Eintracht Bamberg	6	2	1	8	3
SC 04 Schwabach				4	4
1. FC Schweinfurt 05	4	4	2	2	5
SpVgg Ansbach	10	7	6	3	6
Würzburger FV	3	6	5	5	7
SG Quelle Fürth	5	9	8	9	8
SC Regensburg					9
1. SC Feucht	12		3	6	10
Baiersdorfer SV		8	9	10	11
TSV Hirschaid					12
DJK Schwabach					13
FC Gerolzhofen		13			14
SpVgg Bayern Hof	14			11	
ASV Cham				12	
SV Heidingsfeld				13	
SV Erlenbach			7	14	
Jahn Regensburg II			10		
SpVgg Bayreuth	13		11		
TSV Eintracht Bamberg	8		12		
SpVgg Weiden	7	3	13		
TSV Großbardorf			14		
TSV Kareth-Lappersdorf		10			
1. FC Haßfurt	9	11			
JFG Neustadt/Rödengrund		14			
FC Amberg	11				

South	04	05	06	07	08
SpVgg Unterhaching	1	BL	2	1	1
SV Wacker Burghausen	3	4	1	BL	BL
FC Augsburg	4	1	3	4	2
FC Memmingen	2	3	5	7	3
FC Dingolfing	8	2	9	2	4
SC Eintracht Freising	6	7	6	11	
FC Ingolstadt 04		10		3	5
TSV Forstenried			7	5	6
FC Kempten					7
TSV 1860 Rosenheim	7	9	10		8
TSV Waldkirchen	5	8	12		9
FC Königsbrunn	10		8	8	10
TSV 1861 Nördlingen				9	11
SpVgg Ruhmannsfelden		6	4	6	12
SB/DJK Rosenheim				10	
SpVgg Landshut	9	11		12	
SpVgg Plattling			11		
SpVgg Unterhaching II		5			
TSV Aindling		12			
SV Hutthurm	11				
FC Gundelfingen	12				

BL: Bundesliga South/Southwest	RL: Regionalliga South	1: Bavarian champions	1: Division champions

== German championship winning players ==
=== 1. FC Nürnberg ===
- 1974
  - Klaus Müller – Lindner – Günter Dämpfling (1) – Reiner Kraus – Kosian – Horst Weyerich – Reichenbach – Helmut Steuerwald – Suffel – Peter Sommer – Werner Dorok

=== FC Augsburg ===
- 1993
  - Fuchs – Frank Gerster – Thomas Meggle – Neumann – Bachthaler – Dobler – Meier – Michael Rösele – Söhner – Böhringer – Berkant – İlhan Mansız

=== Bayern Munich ===
- 2001
  - Philipp Heerwagen – Leonhard Haas (1) – Markus Husterer – Peter Endres – Martin Rietzler – Enzo Contento – Paul Thomik – Barbaros Barut – Markus Feulner – Philipp Lahm – Zvjezdan Misimović (1) – Piotr Trochowski (1) – Florian Heller – Yunus Karayün
- 2002
  - Michael Rensing – Leonhard Haas – Alexander Aischmann – Andreas Ottl – Barbaros Barut – Michael Stegmayer – Christian Lell – Paul Thomik – Bastian Schweinsteiger – Philipp Lahm (1) – Piotr Trochowski (2) – Erdal Kilicaslan (1) – Borut Semler – Serkan Atak – Peter Endres
- 2004
  - Johannes Höcker – Philipp Rehm – Jan Mauersberger – Georg Niedermeier – Michael Stegmayer – Paul Thomik (1) – Andreas Ottl (1) – Rainer Storhas – Timo Heinze – José Luis Ortíz – Fabian Müller – Borut Semler (1) – Sebastian Heidinger – Markus Steinhöfer – Marijan Holjevac
- Goals in brackets
