= Under 17 Bayernliga =

- Founded: 1975 (Championship) 1988 (Bayernliga)
- Country: Germany
- Confederation: UEFA
- Number of clubs: 12
- Level on pyramid: 2
- Promotion to: Under 17 Bundesliga
- Relegation to: Landesliga Bayern-Süd Landesliga Bayern-Nord
- Current champions: SpVgg Greuther Fürth (2018–19)
- Most championships: FC Bayern Munich (14 titles)

The Under 17 Bayernliga (German: B-Jugend Bayernliga) is the second tier of under 17 youth football in Bavaria, set below the Under 17 Bundesliga South/Southwest.

Until 2000, the league was the highest tier of under 17 football, containing the youth teams of such clubs as FC Bayern Munich, TSV 1860 Munich and 1. FC Nürnberg.

== History ==
=== Pre-Bayernliga era ===
A Bavarian champions for under 17 sides was incepted in 1975, alongside the Bavarian Under 15 championship. It was played as an on-off final.

=== Bayernliga era ===
The Bayernliga was established in 1988, operating as two regional divisions, a northern and a southern one, the B-Jugend Bayernliga Nord and the B-Jugend Bayernliga Süd. The winner of each division would then advance to the Bavarian championship final, an on-off game. The winner of this game, the Bavarian champions, then advanced to the German under 17 championship.

In 2000, the Under 17 Regionalliga South was established, relegating the two Bayernligas to second division status. From now on, the best Bavarian clubs would play in the Regionalliga and the Bayernliga champions played for promotion to this league.

Since 2001, the final between the two league winners was now played in a home-and-away format. Should each team win a game the goals scored were not taken into consideration, instead, a penalty shoot-out was used to determine the winner.

In 2007, the Under 17 Regionalliga South and the Under 19 Regionalliga Southwest merged to form the Under 19 Bundesliga South/Southwest. This changed nothing in the status of the Bayernligas as second divisions.

From the 2008–09 season, the Bayernliga now operates as a single division, allowing direct promotion for its champion. Below this league, two Landesligas, north and south, were slotted in above the seven Bezirksoberligas who previously formed the tier below. A final to determine the Bavarian champions will not be necessary any more, unless two or more teams finish on equal points at the top of the table. In 2010–11, the SpVgg Unterhaching defeated 1. FC Nürnberg II 2–0 in such a decider.

In 2008, the Bavarian football association had 1,853 registered under 17 teams, a 0.7% increase from the previous year. All up, 20,699 junior teams were registered with the BFV in 2008

== Champions ==
=== Pre–Bayernliga era ===
Season	Winner	Finalist	Result
1974–75	TSV 1860 Munich	1. FC Nürnberg	1–0
1975–76	FC Bayern Munich	FC Augsburg	3–0
1976–77	1. FC Nürnberg	FC Augsburg	3–0
1977–78	FC Bayern Munich	FC Augsburg	1–0
1978–79	FC Augsburg	TSV 1860 Munich	5–4
1979–80	TSV 1860 Munich	1. FC Nürnberg	2–1
1980–81	FC Augsburg	TSV 1860 Munich	5–4
1981–82	1. FC Nürnberg	FC Bayern Munich	3–1
1982–83	FC Bayern Munich	1. FC Nürnberg	1–1 / 5–4 after pen.
1983–84	TSV 1860 Munich	FC Augsburg	1–0 aet
1984–85	FC Bayern Munich	FC Augsburg	3–0
1985–86	FC Bayern Munich	1. FC Nürnberg	2–2 / 9–8 after pen.
1986–87	1. FC Nürnberg	FC Bayern Munich	2–1
1987–88	FC Bayern Munich	1. FC Nürnberg	1–0

=== Bayernliga era ===
Season	North	South	Result
1988–89	1. FC Nürnberg	**FC Bayern Munich**	0–3
1989–90	**1. FC Nürnberg**	FC Bayern Munich	0–0 / 4–2 after pen.
1990–91	**1. FC Nürnberg**	FC Augsburg	2–0
1991–92	**1. FC Nürnberg**	FC Bayern Munich	1–0
1992–93	1. FC Nürnberg	**FC Bayern Munich**	0–2
1993–94	1. FC Amberg	**FC Bayern Munich**	1–2
1994–95	1. FC Schweinfurt 05	**FC Augsburg**	1–2
1995–96	**1. FC Nürnberg**	FC Bayern Munich	0–0 / 2–1 after pen.
1996–97	SpVgg Greuther Fürth	**FC Bayern Munich**	0–4
1997–98	SG Post/Süd Regensburg	**FC Bayern Munich**	0–7
1998–99	**1. FC Nürnberg**	TSV 1860 Munich	2–0 aet
1999–2000	1. FC Nürnberg	**FC Bayern Munich**	0–6
2000–01	**SpVgg Greuther Fürth**	FC Königsbrunn	3–1, 1–1
2001–02	Viktoria Aschaffenburg	**SpVgg Unterhaching**	2–3, 0–5
2002–03	SSV Jahn Regensburg	**FC Augsburg**	0–1, 1–4
2003–04	1. FC Bamberg	**SpVgg Unterhaching**	1–1, 0–4
2004–05	**1. FC Schweinfurt 05**	Wacker Burghausen	2–1, 0–1 / 4–3 after pen.
2005–06	SpVgg Greuther Fürth	**FC Augsburg**	1–2, 1–0 / 1–4 after pen.
2006–07	**SSV Jahn Regensburg**	SpVgg Unterhaching	3–2, 2–3 / 4–3 after pen.
2007–08	**SpVgg Greuther Fürth**	FC Augsburg	3–1, 3–3

From 2008 onwards, no final was played anymore:

Season	Champions	Runners–up
2008–09	Wacker Burghausen	SpVgg Unterhaching
2009–10	FC Bayern Munich II	FC Augsburg
2010–11	SpVgg Unterhaching	1. FC Nürnberg II
2011–12	SSV Jahn Regensburg	FC Bayern Munich II
2012–13	FC Ingolstadt 04	SpVgg Greuther Fürth II
2013–14	FC Bayern Munich II	1. FC Nürnberg II
2014–15	FC Augsburg	FC Bayern Munich II
2015–16	SpVgg Unterhaching	1. FC Nürnberg II
2016–17	1. FC Nürnberg	SpVgg Greuther Fürth
2017–18	FC Ingolstadt 04	TSV 1860 Munich
2018–19	SpVgg Greuther Fürth	TSV 1860 Munich

- Bavarian champions in **bold**
- Source: Siegerliste der Bayerischen Meisterschaften U17 (B)–Junioren (in German), accessed: 29 November 2008

=== Winners and finalists ===
As of 2019, this is the standing in the all–time winners list:

Club	Championships	Finals
FC Bayern Munich	14	18
1. FC Nürnberg	9	16
FC Augsburg	6	12
SpVgg Unterhaching	4	3
TSV 1860 Munich	3	8
SpVgg Greuther Fürth	3	5
FC Ingolstadt 04	2	0
SSV Jahn Regensburg	2	2
1. FC Schweinfurt 05	1	2
Wacker Burghausen	1	1
1. FC Bamberg	0	1
Viktoria Aschaffenburg	0	1
FC Königsbrunn	0	1
SG Post/Süd Regensburg	0	1
1. FC Amberg	0	1

== German championship ==
The German under 17 championship was incepted in 1977 and, as of 2019, Bavarian clubs have reached the final 12 times, winning it six times.

Season	Winner	Finalist	Result
1978–79	Blau-Weiß 90 Berlin	FC Augsburg	1–1 / 5–4 after pen.
1983–84	Borussia Dortmund	TSV 1860 Munich	1–0
1986–87	Bayer Uerdingen	1. FC Nürnberg	4–0
1988–89	FC Bayern Munich	Hertha Zehlendorf	1–1 / 5–4 after pen.
1996–97	FC Bayern Munich	Werder Bremen	3–0
1999–00	Hertha BSC Berlin	FC Bayern Munich	1–0
2000–01	FC Bayern Munich	Borussia Dortmund	4–0
2005–06	TSV 1860 Munich	Borussia Dortmund	2–0
2006–07	FC Bayern Munich	Borussia Dortmund	1–0
2008–09	VfB Stuttgart	FC Bayern Munich	3–1 aet
2016–17	FC Bayern Munich	Werder Bremen	2–0
2017–18	Borussia Dortmund	FC Bayern Munich	3–2

== League placings since 2003–04 ==
=== State-wide league ===
The placings in the league since 2008–09, when it moved to a single-division format:

Club	09	10	11	12	13	14	15	16	17	18	19
FC Augsburg	3	2	BL	BL	BL	BL	1	BL	BL	BL	BL
SpVgg Unterhaching	2	4	1	BL	6	5	BL	1	BL	BL	BL
1. FC Nürnberg									1	BL	BL
FC Ingolstadt 04				4	1	BL	4	3	4	1	BL
SpVgg Greuther Fürth									2	4	1
TSV 1860 Munich										2	2
FC Bayern Munich II	8	1	3	2	7	1	2	5	3	3	3
FC Augsburg II									10	5	4
SSV Jahn Regensburg	5	6	8	1	BL	7	10		6	7	5
ASV Neumarkt											6
SpVgg Ansbach								6	5	6	7
FC Ingolstadt 04 II											8
1. FC Nürnberg II	4	3	2	3	5	2	6	2			9
1. FC Schweinfurt 05	10									8	11
FC Memmingen			9	10		9	5	11	8	9	12
SpVgg Bayern Hof		11								11	13
SpVgg Unterhaching II										10	14
FSV Erlangen-Bruck					8	8	8	9	9	12	
TSV 1860 Munich II	7	9	7	5	3	4	3	7	7		
SpVgg GW Deggendorf								8	12		
Viktoria Aschaffenburg				11			9	10	11		
SpVgg Greuther Fürth II	6	7	6	6	2	3	7	4			
SpVgg SV Weiden				12				12			
TSV 1860 Rosenheim		8	11				11				
Wacker Burghausen	1	BL	5	8	4	6	12				
SC Fürstenfeldbruck						10					
SG Quelle Fürth	9	5	4	9	9	11					
SV Memmelsdorf						12					
SC Eintracht Freising	12			7	10						
FC Coburg					11						
FC Dingolfing					12						
FC Eintracht Bamberg			10								
TSV Kareth-Lappersdorf			12								
SV Planegg-Krailling		10									
TSV Großbardorf		12									
SC 04 Schwabach	11										

=== Northern and southern divisions ===
The placings in the northern and southern division until 2007–08, when they were abolished:

North	04	05	06	07	08
SpVgg Greuther Fürth	RL	RL	1	2	1
SSV Jahn Regensburg	2	6	4	1	BL
1. FC Nürnberg II	7	3	2	4	2
1. FC Schweinfurt 05	5	1	RL	9	3
SC 04 Schwabach	3	7	8	6	4
SG Quelle Fürth					5
SpVgg Greuther Fürth II	4	4			
SpVgg Bayern Hof			5	8	6
Viktoria Aschaffenburg	10	2	3	3	7
SSV Jahn Regensburg II					8
1. FC Eintracht Bamberg	1	11		5	9
TSV Kareth-Lappersdorf					10
TSV Großbardorf					11
SpVgg Ansbach		13		7	12
SpVgg Weiden	14			10	13
SpVgg Bayreuth			13		14
DVV Coburg	6	8	9	11	
Würzburger FV	8	14		12	
SV Hallstadt				13	
1. SC Feucht			6	14	
ASV Cham		10	10	15	
TSV Eintracht Bamberg	9	5	7		
SG 83 Nürnberg-Fürth			11		
SV Grafenwöhr			12		
DJK Schweinfurt			14		
SpVgg Hof		9			
1. FC Haßfurt		12			
SK Lauf	11				
FC Bayern Alzenau	12				
Baiersdorfer SV	13				

South	04	05	06	07	08
TSV 1860 Munich II	3	2	2	1	1
FC Augsburg	RL	RL	1	RL	2
SpVgg Unterhaching	1	RL	RL	2	3
Wacker Burghausen	5	1	5	3	4
FC Bayern Munich II	4	4	3	4	5
SC Fürstenfeldbruck					6
FC Ingolstadt 04		7	8	6	7
TSG Thannhausen					8
TSV 1860 Rosenheim	8	10		8	9
SpVgg Grün-Weiß Deggendorf		8	4	5	10
FC Memmingen	10		9	9	11
JFG Donauwörth				7	12
FC Vilshofen		11			13
FC Dingolfing	7	3	6	10	
SE Freising				11	
SpVgg Landshut	11			12	
SpVgg Unterhaching II			7		
FT Starnberg 09			10		
ETSV 09 Landshut			11		
TSV 1861 Nördlingen	2	6	12		
FC Augsburg II		5			
SpVgg Ruhmannsfelden	9	9			
FC Königsbrunn	6	12			
FC Kempten	12				

BL: Bundesliga South/Southwest	RL: Regionalliga South	1: Bavarian champions	1: Division champions

== German championship winning players ==
=== FC Bayern Munich ===
- 1989
  - Andreas Schöttl - Markus Babbel - Daniel Punzelt - Mate Karaula - Dieter Schönberger - Alexander Roth - Schmidt - Christian Nerlinger - Max Eberl - Gehann - Wolfgang Tripp - Bauer - Papachristous
- 1997
  - Matthias Küfner – Marcin Mamzer - Stephan Kling - Stefan Bürgermeier - Simon Kelletshofer – Sebastian Backer - Benjamin Schöckel - Steffen Hofmann - Sebastian Bönig - Zvjezdan Misimović - Daniel Jungwirth – Patrick Mölzl - Thomas Hitzlsperger - Aykin Aydemir - David Reinisch
- 2001
  - Michael Rensing - Markus Grünberger - Andy Balck - Daniel Brode - Christian Lell - Florian Stegmann - Andreas Ottl - Bastian Schweinsteiger (1) - Ada Oğuz - Thorsten Schulz - Paul Thomik - Domenico Contento - Erdal Kilicaslan (2) - Serkan Atak (1) - Robert Rakaric
- 2007
  - Ferdinand Oswald - Uwe Schlottner - Christoph Herberth - Matthias Haas - Moritz Schapfl - Mario Erb - Gianluca Simari - Roberto Soriano - Jonas Hummels - Diego Contento - Mehmet Ekici - Nikola Trkulja - Vincent Bönig - Yannick Kakoko (1) - Florian Elender
- 2017
  - Michael Wagner - Thomas Rausch - Alexander Nitzl - Lars Lukas Mai - Marin Pudić - Tobias Heiland - Daniel Jelisić - Flavius Daniliuc - Marcel Zylla (1) - Can Karatas - Benedict Hollerbach (1) - Franck Evina - Progon Maloku - Oliver Batista Meier - Yannick Brugger

=== TSV 1860 Munich ===
- 2006
  - Patrick Rösch - Daniel Thomas - Florian Jungwirth - Mathias Wittek - Stefan Alschinger - Sven Bender - Sandro Kaiser - Lars Bender - Max Knauer - Timo Gebhart - Manuel Schäffler (1)
- Goals in brackets
