= FC Bayern Munich Junior Team =

Bayern Munich Junior Team
- Full name: Football Club Bayern Munich Junior Team
- Nickname: FC Bayern Campus
- Founded: 1902; 1995 (restructured)
- Stadium: Bayern Campus
- Capacity: 2,500
- Director: Jochen Sauer
Home colours	Away colours	Third colours

The FC Bayern Munich Junior Team is the youth academy for the German football club Bayern Munich. The Junior Team was created in 1902 and restructured in 1995. It has educated many players who have become regulars in the Bundesliga and Germany. The vision for the Junior Team is "to educate young players so that it will be possible for FCB to keep a global position in club football in the next millennium" and its mission is "to have the best youth development in club football."

== History ==
The Junior Team was created in 1902 and restructured in 1995.

In 2006, Bayern purchased land near the Allianz Arena with the purpose of building a new youth academy. In 2015, the project, which was estimated to cost €70 million, was started, after overcoming internal resistance. The main reasons for the project were that the existing facilities were too small and that the club, while very successful at senior level, lacked competitiveness with other German and European clubs at youth level. The new facility was scheduled to open in the 2017–18 season.

On 21 April 2026, Michael Wiesinger was appointed as head of sport and youth development at the FC Bayern Campus.

== Overview ==
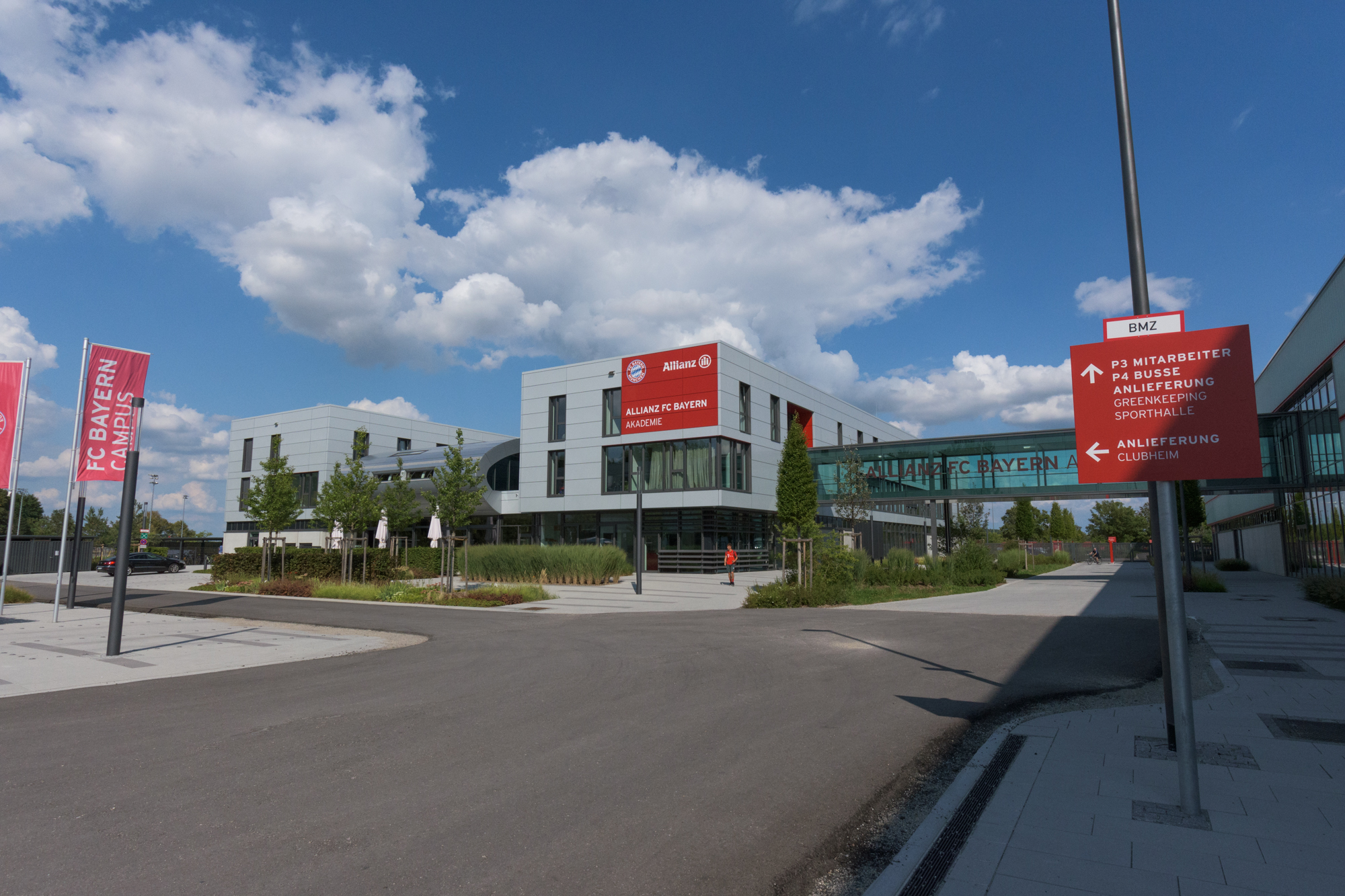
The Bayern Academy at the campus in Munich

The vision for the Junior Team is "to educate young players so that it will be possible for FCB to keep a global position in club football in the next millennium" and its mission is "to have the best youth development in club football".

There are 165 players, 16 instructors and managers, 1 physiotherapist and 1 masseur. Rosters remain unchanged while the kids learn their trade whether it be for goalkeeper, defence, midfield or forward. They are trained for no more than one or two positions.

The Bayern Munich Junior Team uses a 4–3–3 formation system from D Juniors and upwards. Players from overseas are offered accommodation in a youth apartment block with 13 single rooms inside the club grounds on Säbener Straße. The facility arrangement is different from many other high-profile clubs, in that both the first team and the youth teams train at the same location.

Bayern Munich has a residence building for players who are between 15 and 18 and live too far away from the training ground. Up to 14 youth team players can live there. They have an employee in the residence building who, in the morning, wakes everyone up and prepares a breakfast buffet and also takes care of small and large problems of youth players. There are up to eight part-time teachers are available to support the youth players to compensate for the educational gaps. The ground floor of the youth center is also the office of the junior team and a meeting room for the coaches.

== Scouting ==
Bayern Munich has scouts all over the world, though most of the scouting happens within a few hours drive of Munich. Thomas Hitzlsperger, Christian Lell, Andreas Ottl, former captain Philipp Lahm and most recent graduates Holger Badstuber, Diego Contento and Thomas Müller are all from either Munich or within a 70 km radius of the city.

As part of the restructuring and to help find players for the Junior Team, Bayern Munich has developed a "Talent Day" where up to 500 boys are scouted. The Talent Days are done over Saturday and Sunday. The format used is three 20-minute 5-a-side matches on reduced-sized football fields. The scouts are looking for how well the participants "cope with the ball" with "particular skill", "excellent dribbling" and "good vision". An average of seven children will make it to the Bayern Munich Junior Team during Talent days. Talent Days has drawn "worldwide attention". The event has drawn participants from all over Germany along with participants from Austria, France, Italy, Egypt, Slovenia, Slovakia and Australia.

In 2003, Bayern Munich started partnering with other football clubs. The partner clubs are SpVgg Unterhaching, Ingolstadt 04, Kickers Offenbach and Ulm 1846, 1860 Rosenheim, SpVgg Landshut, TSV Milbertshofen and SC Fürstenfeldbruck. SpVgg Unterhaching, Ingolstadt 04, Kickers Offenbach and Ulm 1846 are the elite partners. 1860 Rosenheim and SpVgg Landshut are regional partners. TSV Milbertshofen and SC Fürstenfeldbruck are local partners. Udo Bassemir is responsible for club partnerships. Players they are interested in are not transferred immediately. They allow the player to train at their own club and at Bayern Munich's training fields and the transfer happens at the "right time".

== Reserve team ==
The penultimate stage for youngsters at Bayern is Bayern Munich II, which currently plays in the Regionalliga Bayern, the fourth tier of German football.

== Current youth squads ==
=== Under-19 (U19) ===
The team currently competes in the U19 DFB-Nachwuchsliga and the UEFA Youth League. It also participates in the DFB-Pokal der Junioren. Leonhard Haas has been the head coach since July 2026, while Dante (head coach of Bayern Munich II) manages the team in the UEFA Youth League since July 2026. Players in bold are those who have been called-up and/or featured with the senior squad.

As of 1 September 2026

Note: Flags indicate national team as defined under FIFA eligibility rules; some limited exceptions apply. Players may hold more than one non-FIFA nationality.

No.	Pos.	Nation	Player
—	GK	KOR	Heo Jae-won (on loan from Jeju SK)
—	GK	GER	Matthias Kösters
—	GK	GER	Luis Nadler
—	GK	GER	**David Podar-Știube**
—	GK	GER	Leonard Ruland
—	DF	NGR	Richard Ajayi
—	DF	GER	Valentin Beckert
—	DF	GER	Adam El-Chaar
—	DF	ALB	Afrim Gashi
—	DF	GER	Jakob Horvath
—	DF	GRE	Konstantinos Karandrikas
—	DF	FRA	Thibault Maspimby
—	DF	CRO	Roko Mijatović
—	DF	GER	Rayan Moumouni
—	DF	GER	Skender Nuraj
—	DF	GER	Raphael Pavlić
—	DF	GER	Xaver Pucci
—	DF	NED	Chivano Wijks

No.	Pos.	Nation	Player
—	MF	GER	Yll Gashi
—	MF	POL	Kuba Horoszczak
—	MF	GER	Wisdom Imade
—	MF	AUT	Matteo Marić
—	MF	AUT	Michael Matošević
—	MF	KOS	**Erblin Osmani**
—	MF	GER	Simon Schaff
—	MF	GER	Leopold Schmid
—	MF	NED	Roy Snip
—	FW	GER	Chris Afanou
—	FW	GER	Luca Babl
—	FW	GER	Jason Eckl
—	FW	NGR	Frank Egwuatu
—	FW	CMR	Aviel Hentcho
—	FW	CMR	Aristide Hentcho
—	FW	GER	Philipp von Taube
—	FW	GER	Oluwaseyi Wilson

=== Out on loan ===
As of 5 August 2026

Note: Flags indicate national team as defined under FIFA eligibility rules; some limited exceptions apply. Players may hold more than one non-FIFA nationality.

No.	Pos.	Nation	Player
—	FW	GER	Piet Burghardt (at SpVgg Unterhaching until 30 June 2027)

=== Under-17 (U17) ===
The team currently competes in the U17 DFB-Nachwuchsliga. Lars Bender has been the head coach since July 2026.

As of 11 October 2026

Note: Flags indicate national team as defined under FIFA eligibility rules; some limited exceptions apply. Players may hold more than one non-FIFA nationality.

No.	Pos.	Nation	Player
—	GK	BIH	Amar Omerović
—	GK	GER	Jona Röhlk
—	GK	GER	Maximilian Sießmeier
—	GK	GER	Michael Steiner
—	DF	GER	Timo Dachgruber
—	DF	GER	Lukas Dillschneider
—	DF	GER	Tim Ebert
—	DF	TUR	Atakan Etüz
—	DF	GER	Noah Fichtl
—	DF	COD	Joyce Nduka
—	DF	KOS	Lamar Rama
—	DF	GER	Tim Schreyer
—	MF	GER	Roko Ciglar

No.	Pos.	Nation	Player
—	MF	GER	Isuf Hiseni
—	MF	GER	Franz Hoffmann
—	MF	GER	Maximilian Mahr
—	MF	BIH	Tarik Mujić
—	MF	GER	Noah Rieber
—	MF	GER	Kemi Seudie
—	MF	BIH	Deni Zubović
—	FW	GER	Daniel Abade
—	FW	GER	Niklas Herber
—	FW	KOS	Florent Krasniqi
—	FW	GER	Linus Ludwig
—	FW	GER	Vedad Turbić

== Technical staff ==
The director of the youth setup at Bayern Munich is Jochen Sauer. The following staff are in charge of the various age groups:

Role	Under-19	Under-17
Head coach	(Germany) Leonhard Haas	(Germany) Lars Bender
Assistant coaches	(Germany) Stefan Meissner	(Germany) Benjamin Kauffmann
Assistant coaches	(Germany) Florian Mayer	(Germany) Philipp Deppner
Goalkeeping coach	(Germany) Tom Starke	(Germany) Simon Jentzsch
Athletic coach	(Germany) Felix Bachmaier	(Germany) Dennis Göller

== Noted graduates ==
The following players played either first team football for Bayern or in the Bundesliga for another club:

Player	Year joined club	Years played for 1st team	National team	Years played for National Team	Major Accomplishments
Franz Beckenbauer	1959	1964–1977	Germany	1965–1977	WC74(c); EC72(c); EC runner-up 76; Euro Cup 74, 75, 76
Sepp Maier	1959	1962–1979	Germany	1966–1979	WC74, EC72, EC runner-up 76; Euro Cup 74, 75, 76
Hans-Georg Schwarzenbeck	1962	1966–1981	Germany	1971–1978	WC74; EC72; EC runner-up 76; Euro Cup 74, 75, 76
Klaus Augenthaler	1975	1976–1991	Germany	1983–1990	WC90; EC80; Euro Cup runner-up 82, 87
Hans Pflügler	1975	1981–1992, 1995	Germany	1987–1990	WC90
Manfred Schwabl	1977	1985–1986, 1989–1993	Germany	1987–1988	—
Max Eberl	1979	1991–1994	—	—	—
Raimond Aumann	1980	1982–1994	Germany	1989–1990	WC90; Euro Cup Runner-up 1987
Markus Babbel	1981	1991–2000	Germany	1995–2000	EC96; UCL runner-up 99; UEFA Cup 96, 01
Christian Nerlinger	1986	1992–1998	Germany	1998–1999	UEFA Cup 96
Dietmar Hamann	1989	1993–1998	Germany	1998–2005	WC runner-up 02; UCL 06; UEFA Cup 96, 01
Thomas Hitzlsperger	1989	—	Germany	2004–2010	EC runner-up 08
Uwe Gospodarek	1989	1991–1995	—	—	—
Christian Lell	1993	2003–2010	—	—	—
David Jarolím	1995	1997–2000	Czech Republic	2005–2009	UCL runner-up 99
Philipp Lahm	1995	2002–2017	Germany	2004–2014	WC14(c); EC runner-up 08; UCL 13; UCL runner-up 10, 12
Mats Hummels	1995	2007–2009; 2016–2019	Germany	2010–2018	WC14; UCL runner-up 13, 24
Diego Contento	1995	2010–2014	—	—	UCL runner-up 10
Georg Niedermeier	1995	—	—	—	—
Stephan Fürstner	1995	2006–2009	—	—	—
Sandro Wagner	1995	2007–2018	Germany	2017–2018	2 goals in UEFA U-21 Final win over England
Andreas Ottl	1996	2005–2011	—	—	—
Philipp Heerwagen	1997	—	—	—	—
Markus Feulner	1997	2001–2003	—	—	—
Owen Hargreaves	1997	2001–2007	England	2001–2008	UCL 01, 08
Mehmet Ekici	1997	2010–2011	Turkey	2010 – present	—
Bastian Schweinsteiger	1998	2003–2015	Germany	2004–2016	WC14; EC Runner-up 08, UCL 13; UCL runner-up 10, 12
Piotr Trochowski	1999	2002–2005	Germany	2006–2010	EC Runner-up 08; Europa League 13; Intertoto Cup 05, 07
Thomas Müller	2000	2008 – 2025	Germany	2010 – 2024	WC14; UCL 13, 20; UCL runner-up 10, 12
Zvjezdan Misimović	2000	2003–2004	Bosnia and Herzegovina	2004–2014	2nd in caps and goals for Bosnia and Herzegovina
Michael Rensing	2000	2003–2010	—	—	—
Holger Badstuber	2002	2009–2017	Germany	2010 – present	UCL 13; CWC 13
José Paolo Guerrero	2002	2004–2006	Peru	2005 – present	CWC 12; Intertoto Cup 07; Peru's all-time leading scorer
Thomas Kraft	2004	2008–2011	—	—	—
Gianluca Gaudino	2004	2014–2017	—	—	—
Toni Kroos	2006	2007–2014	Germany	2010 – present	WC14; UCL 13, 16, 17, 18, 22; UCL runner-up 12
David Alaba	2008	2010 – 2021	Austria	2009 – present	UCL 13, 20, 22; UCL runner-up 10, 12
Emre Can	2009	2012–2013	Germany	2015 – present	UCL 13; Europa League runner-up 16
Alessandro Schöpf	2009	—	Austria	2016 – present	—
Julian Green	2010	2013–2016	United States	2014 – present	Scored 1 goal in 10 minutes at WC14
Kenan Yıldız	2012	—	Turkey	2023 – present	Euro Cup 24

Note: So far, that means the Bayern München Junior Academy has produced;

- FIFA World Cup
  - 2 World Cup winning captains
  - 11 World Cup winners
- UEFA European Championships
  - 5 European Championship winners
- UEFA Champions League
  - 13 European Cup/ Champions League winners
- UEFA Europa League
  - 5 UEFA Cup/Europa League winners

== Honours ==
=== Youth ===
- Under 19 Bundesliga
  - Winners: 2001, 2002, 2004
  - Runners-up: 1998, 2006, 2007, 2012, 2017
- Under 17 Bundesliga
  - Winners: 1989, 1997, 2001, 2007, 2017
  - Runners-up: 2000, 2009, 2018
- South/Southwest German Under 19 championship
  - Winners: 2004, 2007, 2012, 2013, 2017
- South/Southwest German Under 17 championship
  - Winners: 2009, 2017, 2018, 2019
- Southern German Under 19 championship
  - Winners: 1950, 1954
- Southern German Under 15 championship
  - Winners: 1982, 1985, 1987, 1990, 1991
- Bavarian Under 19 championship
  - Winners: 1950, 1954, 1966, 1972, 1973, 1981, 1985, 1987, 1991, 1992, 1994, 1995, 1996
  - Runners-up: 1946, 1960, 1964, 1980, 1999^{‡}
- Bavarian Under 17 championship
  - Winners: 1976, 1978, 1983, 1985, 1986, 1988, 1989, 1993, 1994, 1997, 1998, 2000, 2010^{‡}, 2014^{‡}
  - Runners-up: 1982, 1987, 1990, 1992, 1996, 2012^{‡}, 2015^{‡}
- Bavarian Under 15 championship
  - Winners: 1975, 1978, 1982, 1985, 1987, 1990, 1991, 1994, 1995, 2007, 2009
  - Runners-up: 1976, 1977, 1988, 1992, 2008
- ^{‡} Reserve team

== Recent seasons ==
The recent season-by-season performance of the club's under 19 and under 17 sides since 2003–04:

=== Under-19 ===
Year	Divisionnsjzj	Tier	League Position	National Championship
2003–04	Bundesliga – South/Southwest	I	1st	Champions
2004–05	Bundesliga – South/Southwest	I	6th	—
2005–06	Bundesliga – South/Southwest	I	2nd	Runners-up
2006–07	Bundesliga – South/Southwest	I	1st	Runners-up
2007–08	Bundesliga – South/Southwest	I	3rd	—
2008–09	Bundesliga – South/Southwest	I	3rd	—
2009–10	Bundesliga – South/Southwest	I	9th	—
2010–11	Bundesliga – South/Southwest	I	7th	—
2011–12	Bundesliga – South/Southwest	I	1st	Runners-up
2012–13	Bundesliga – South/Southwest	I	1st	Semi-finals
2013–14	Bundesliga – South/Southwest	I	6th	—
2014–15	Bundesliga – South/Southwest	I	5th	—
2015–16	Bundesliga – South/Southwest	I	8th	—
2016–17	Bundesliga – South/Southwest	I	1st	Runners-up
2017–18	Bundesliga – South/Southwest	I	2nd	—
2018–19	Bundesliga – South/Southwest	I	4th	—

=== Under-17 ===
Year	Division	Tier	League Position	National Championship
2003–04	Regionalliga – South	I	6th	—
2004–05	Regionalliga – South	I	5th	—
2005–06	Regionalliga – South	I	3rd	—
2006–07	Regionalliga – South	I	1st	Champions
2007–08	Bundesliga – South/Southwest	I	6th	—
2008–09	Bundesliga – South/Southwest	I	1st	Runners-up
2009–10	Bundesliga – South/Southwest	I	6th	—
2010–11	Bundesliga – South/Southwest	I	4th	—
2011–12	Bundesliga – South/Southwest	I	4th	—
2012–13	Bundesliga – South/Southwest	I	8th	—
2013–14	Bundesliga – South/Southwest	I	6th	—
2014–15	Bundesliga – South/Southwest	I	5th	—
2015–16	Bundesliga – South/Southwest	I	2nd	—
2016–17	Bundesliga – South/Southwest	I	1st	Champions
2017–18	Bundesliga – South/Southwest	I	1st	Runners-up
2018–19	Bundesliga – South/Southwest	I	1st	Semi-finals

== Heads of the Junior team ==
Head	Start date	End date	Source
Werner Kern	1998	30 June 2012	
Hans-Jörg Butt	1 July 2012	7 August 2012	
Wolfgang Dremmler	9 August 2012	30 June 2017	
Jochen Sauer	1 July 2017	Present	

== German championship winning teams ==
Bayern Munich has won the German under 19 championship three times and the under 17 championship five times. Here are the championship winning teams with goals in the final in brackets:

=== Under-19 ===
2001: FC Bayern Munich – Bayer Leverkusen 3–2
Philipp Heerwagen – Leonhard Haas (1) – Markus Husterer – Peter Endres – Martin Rietzler – Enzo Contento – Paul Thomik – Barbaros Barut – Markus Feulner – Philipp Lahm – Zvjezdan Misimović (1) – Piotr Trochowski (1) – Florian Heller – Yunus Karayün

2002: FC Bayern Munich – VfB Stuttgart 4–0
Michael Rensing – Leonhard Haas – Alexander Aischmann – Andreas Ottl – Barbaros Barut – Michael Stegmayer – Christian Lell – Paul Thomik – Bastian Schweinsteiger – Philipp Lahm (1) – Piotr Trochowski (2) – Erdal Kilicaslan (1) – Borut Semler – Serkan Atak – Peter Endres

2004: FC Bayern Munich – VfL Bochum 3–0
Johannes Höcker – Philipp Rehm – Jan Mauersberger – Georg Niedermeier – Michael Stegmayer – Paul Thomik (1) – Andreas Ottl (1) – Rainer Storhas – Timo Heinze – José Luis Ortíz – Fabian Müller – Borut Semler (1) – Sebastian Heidinger – Markus Steinhöfer – Marijan Holjevac

=== Under-17 ===
1989: FC Bayern Munich – Hertha Zehlendorf 1–1 (5–4 pen)
Andreas Schöttl – Markus Babbel – Daniel Punzelt – Mate Karaula – Dieter Schönberger – Alexander Roth – Schmidt – Christian Nerlinger – Max Eberl – Gehann – Wolfgang Tripp – Bauer – Papachristous

1997: FC Bayern Munich – Werder Bremen 3–0
Matthias Küfner – Marcin Mamzer – Stephan Kling – Stefan Bürgermeier – Simon Kelletshofer – Sebastian Backer – Benjamin Schöckel – Steffen Hofmann – Sebastian Bönig – Zvjezdan Misimović – Daniel Jungwirth – Patrick Mölzl – Thomas Hitzlsperger – Aykin Aydemir – David Reinisch

2001: FC Bayern Munich – Borussia Dortmund 4–0
Michael Rensing – Markus Grünberger – Andy Balck – Daniel Brode – Christian Lell – Florian Stegmann – Andreas Ottl – Bastian Schweinsteiger (1) – Ada Oğuz – Thorsten Schulz – Paul Thomik – Domenico Contento – Erdal Kilicaslan (2) – Serkan Atak (1) – Robert Rakaric

2007: FC Bayern Munich – Borussia Dortmund 1–0
Ferdinand Oswald – Uwe Schlottner – Christoph Herberth – Matthias Haas – Moritz Schapfl – Mario Erb – Gianluca Simari – Roberto Soriano – Jonas Hummels – Diego Contento – Mehmet Ekici – Nikola Trkulja – Vincent Bönig – Yannick Kakoko (1) – Florian Elender

2017: FC Bayern Munich – Werder Bremen 2–0
Michael Wagner – Thomas Rausch – Alexander Nitzl – Lars Lukas Mai – Marin Pudić – Tobias Heiland – Daniel Jelisić – Flavius Daniliuc – Marcel Zylla (1) – Can Karatas – Benedict Hollerbach (1) – Franck Evina – Progon Maloku – Oliver Batista Meier – Yannick Brugger
