= Bayernliga (disambiguation) =

The Bayernliga is the highest football league in Bavaria. It can be translated as Bavarian league. Bayernliga may also refer to:

== Football ==
- Bayernliga: The fifth tier of the German football league system
- Under 19 Fußball-Bayernliga: A youth football league in Bavaria for under 19 year olds
- Under 17 Fußball-Bayernliga: A youth football league in Bavaria for under 17 year olds
- Under 15 Fußball-Bayernliga: A youth football league in Bavaria for under 15 year olds

== Ice hockey ==
- Bayernliga: Highest ice hockey league in Bavaria
