= Under 17 Bundesliga =

- Founded: 1976 (Championship) 2007 (Bundesliga)
- Country: Germany
- Confederation: UEFA
- Divisions: 3
- Number of clubs: 42
- Level on pyramid: 1
- Current champions: Borussia Dortmund (8th title) (2023–24)
- Most championships: Borussia Dortmund (8 titles)

The Under 17 Bundesliga (German: B-Junioren Bundesliga) is the highest level of play in German football for male juniors between the ages of 15 and 17. It was formed in 2007 and operates in three regional divisions with 14 clubs each. At the end of season, the three division champions and one of the runners-up determine the German champions for this age group.

== History ==
The league was formed in 2007, when the five U 17 Regionalligas merged to form the three Bundesligas as follows:

- Under 17 Bundesliga North/Northeast formed from:
  - Under 17 Regionalliga North
  - Under 17 Regionalliga Northeast
- Under 17 Bundesliga South/Southwest formed from:
  - Under 17 Regionalliga South
  - Under 17 Regionalliga Southwest
- Under 17 Bundesliga West formed from:
  - Under 17 Regionalliga West

As such, the German Football Association followed the example it had set with the Under 19 Bundesliga in 2003, which were reorganised in the same fashion.

The Regionalligas themselves had only been formed in 2000, to replace an even more regionalised system with separate leagues for every regional football association.

== Mode ==
The clubs in each of the three divisions play a home-and-away round whereby there is no inter-league play. Every club plays therefore 26 regular season games. The bottom three teams in each division are relegated to the next level below, in turn, the best three teams from the region are promoted.

The winner of each league plus the runners-up of the South/Southwest region play in the finals round for the German Under 17 championship. The semi-finals are played in a home-and-away format. If the two semi-final teams playing each other are level on points and goals after the second game, there will be a penalty shoot-out. No extra time will be played.

The two semi-final winners reach the final, which is held at the location of the winner of the predetermined semi-final A, unless the team's stadium does not comply with DFB requirement, in which case an alternative venue will be determined. In the final, which is one game only, in case of a draw after normal time, a 20-minute extra time will be played. If the game is still a draw, a penalty shoot-out will determine the winner.

== Geography ==
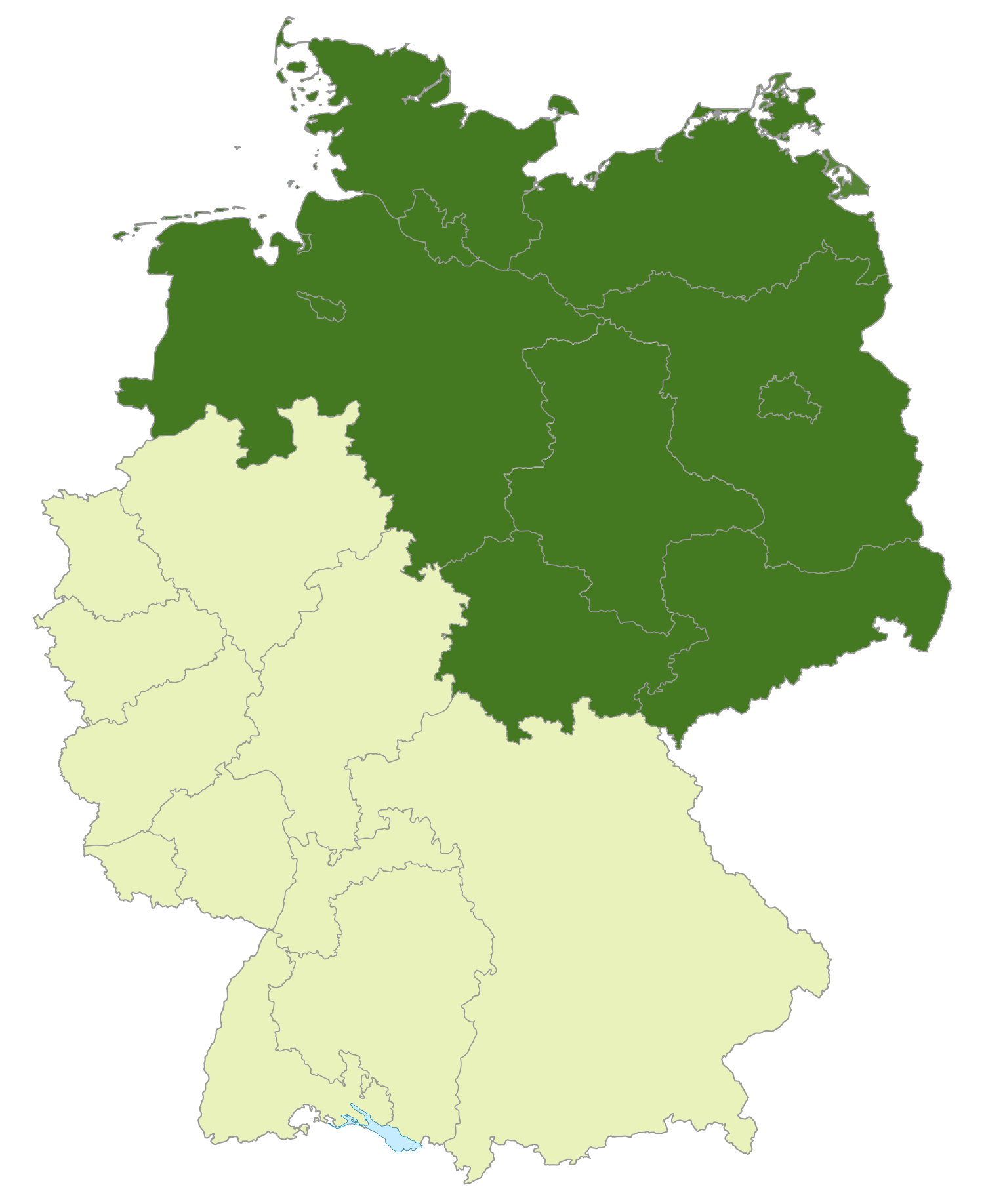
Bundesliga North/Northeast

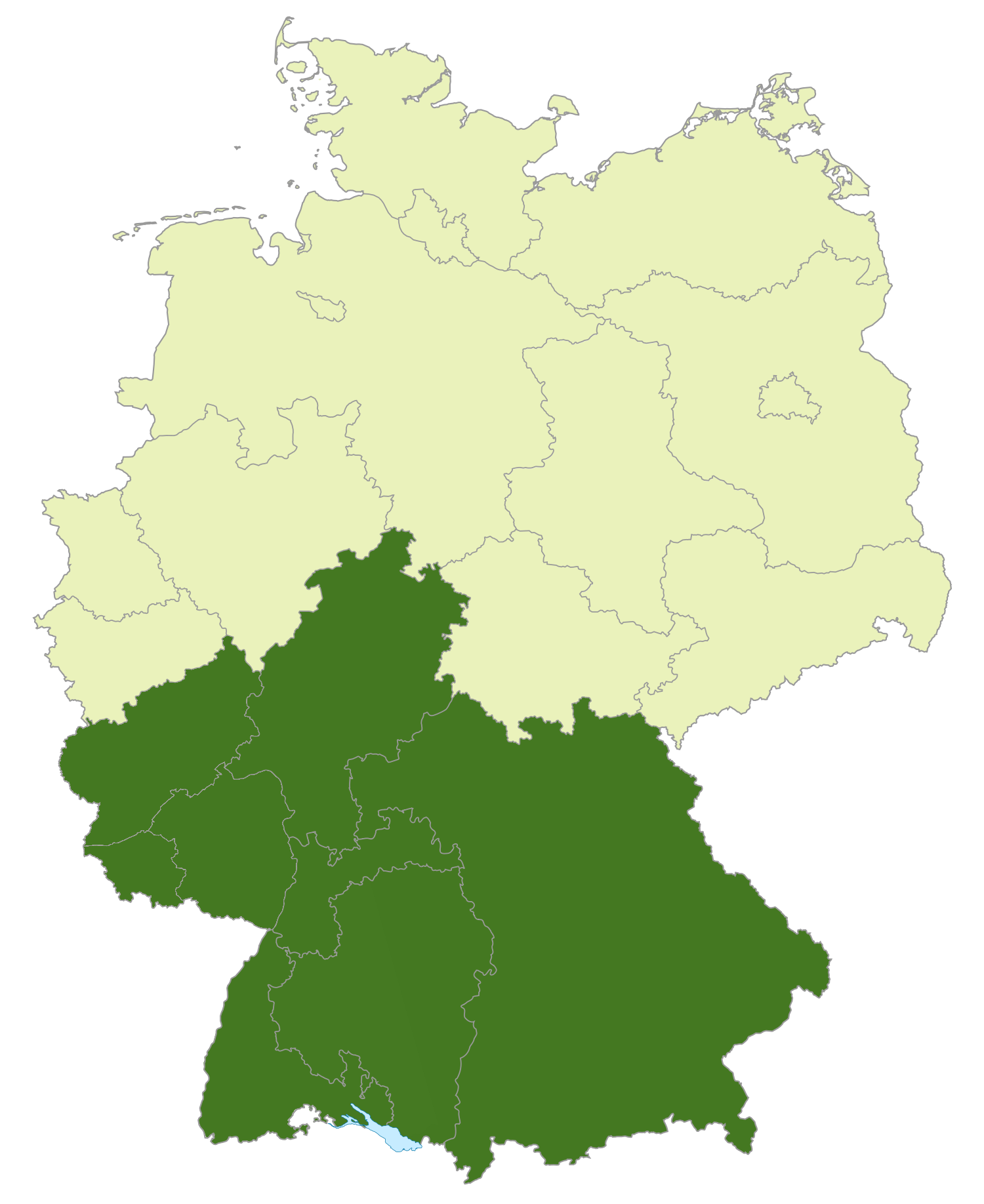
Bundesliga South/Southwest

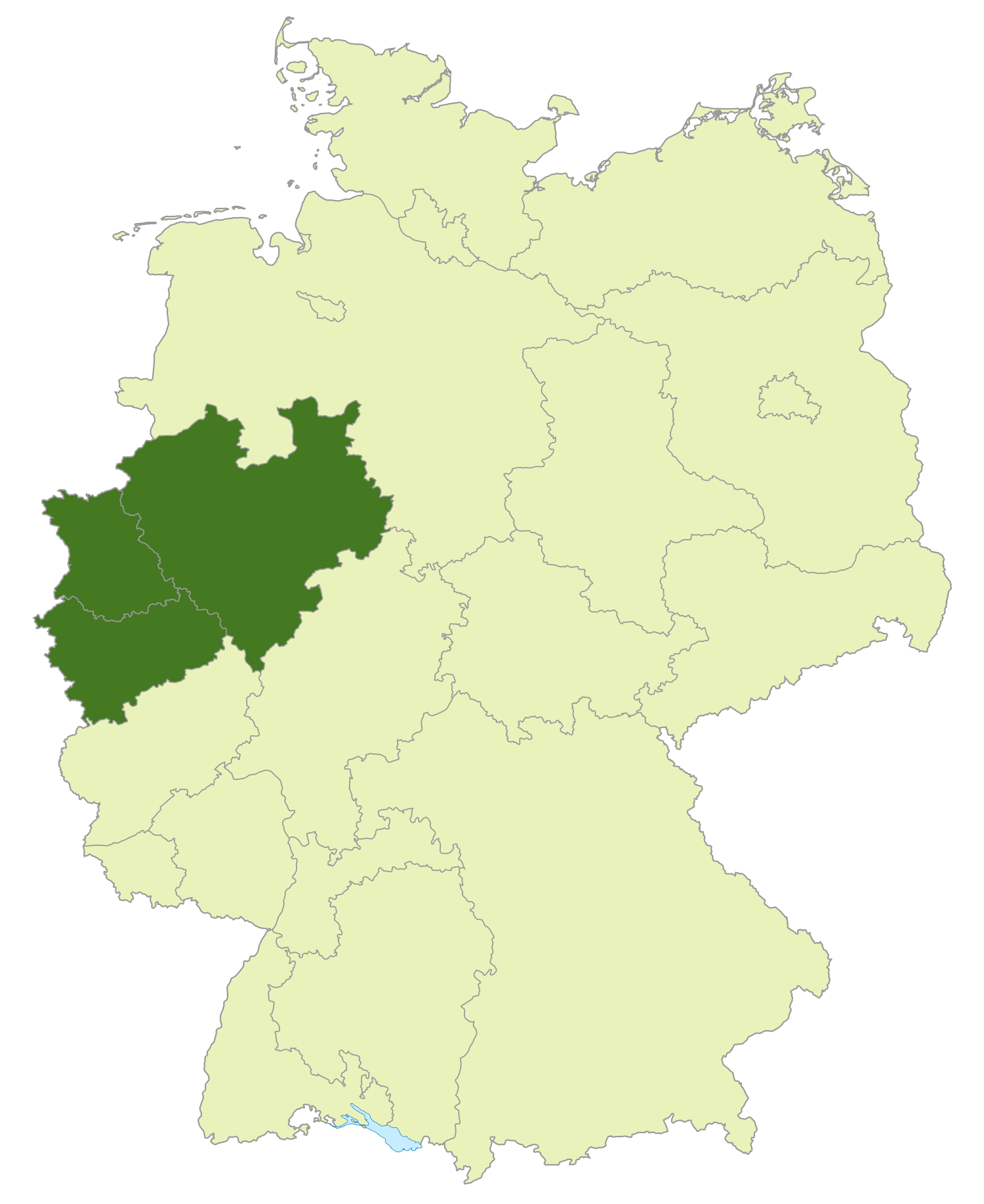
Bundesliga West

The three Bundesligas are not geographically balanced, North/Northeast covers a large area while West a rather small one, but in population terms, the arrangement is much more level. The three leagues cover the following states:

- Under 17 Bundesliga North/Northeast
  - Berlin
  - Brandenburg
  - Bremen
  - Hamburg
  - Lower Saxony
  - Mecklenburg-Vorpommern
  - Saxony
  - Saxony-Anhalt
  - Schleswig-Holstein
  - Thuringia
- Under 17 Bundesliga South/Southwest
  - Baden-Württemberg
  - Bavaria
  - Hesse
  - Rhineland-Palatinate
  - Saarland
- Under 17 Bundesliga West
  - North Rhine-Westphalia

== League pyramid ==
Below the three Bundesligas, a number of second-tier leagues exist which teams are promoted from and relegated to. The league system operates as follows for the 2008–09 season.

=== Under 17 Bundesliga North/Northeast ===
The league has two second divisions as the tier below, these being:

- Regionalliga North
- Regionalliga Northeast

The league champions are directly promoted while the two runners-ups play each other for a third promotion spot

=== Under 17 Bundesliga South/Southwest ===
The league has four second divisions as the tier below, these being:

- Regionalliga Southwest
- Hessenliga
- Oberliga Baden-Württemberg
- Bayernliga

The winners of the Oberliga Baden-Württemberg and Bayernliga are directly promoted. A third promoted team is determined between the winners of the Hessenliga and the Regionalliga Southwest.

=== Under 17 Bundesliga West ===
The league has three second divisions as the tier below, these being:

- Verbandsliga Mittelrhein
- Verbandsliga Niederrhein
- Westfalenliga

The three league champions are directly promoted.

== Levels of youth football ==
German football recognises seven levels of junior football, determined by age and labeled with letters, whereby A is the oldest. In the A level, mixed teams of male and females are not permitted while in B and C mixed teams are allowed if the parents or guardians of the children permit it. Below the C level, mixed teams are generally permitted without restrictions.

Name	Age
A-Junioren	Under 19
B-Junioren	Under 17
C-Junioren	Under 15
D-Junioren	Under 13
E-Junioren	Under 11
F-Junioren	Under 9
G-Junioren	Under 7

== Division champions ==
The champions of the three divisions:

Season	North/Northeast	South/Southwest	West
2007–08	Hertha BSC	TSG 1899 Hoffenheim	Borussia Dortmund
2008–09	VfL Wolfsburg	FC Bayern Munich	Borussia Mönchengladbach
2009–10	Hertha BSC	Eintracht Frankfurt	Bayer Leverkusen
2010–11	Werder Bremen	VfB Stuttgart	1. FC Köln
2011–12	Hertha BSC	1. FC Nürnberg	1. FC Köln
2012–13	Hertha BSC	VfB Stuttgart	FC Schalke 04
2013–14	RB Leipzig	1. FSV Mainz 05	Borussia Dortmund
2014–15	RB Leipzig	VfB Stuttgart	Borussia Dortmund
2015–16	VfL Wolfsburg	VfB Stuttgart	Borussia Dortmund
2016–17	Werder Bremen	FC Bayern Munich	FC Schalke 04
2017–18	RB Leipzig	FC Bayern Munich	Borussia Dortmund
2018–19	VfL Wolfsburg	FC Bayern Munich	Borussia Dortmund

== Championship winners ==
The German under 17 football championship begun in 1977, with the first final being played on 3 July 1977 in Niefern.

=== Pre-Bundesliga era ===
Season	Winner	Finalist	Result
1976–77	**Eintracht Frankfurt**	FC Schalke 04	2–1
1977–78	**FC Schalke 04**	Hertha Zehlendorf	6–0
1978–79	**Blau-Weiß 1890 Berlin**	FC Augsburg	1–1 aet (5–4 pen)
1979–80	**Eintracht Frankfurt** (2)	FC Schalke 04	2–1
1980–81	**Borussia Mönchengladbach**	Eintracht Frankfurt	1–0
1981–82	**SG Wattenscheid 09**	Eintracht Frankfurt	3–1
1982–83	**1. FC Kaiserslautern**	Werder Bremen	2–1
1983–84	**Borussia Dortmund**	TSV 1860 Munich	1–0
1984–85	**VfL Bochum**	Kickers Offenbach	3–0
1985–86	**VfB Stuttgart**	Schwarz-Weiß Essen	5–0
1986–87	**Bayer Uerdingen**	1. FC Nürnberg	4–0
1987–88	**Hertha Zehlendorf**	VfB Stuttgart	2–1
1988–89	**FC Bayern Munich**	Hertha Zehlendorf	1–1 aet (5–4 pen)
1989–90	**1. FC Köln**	VfB Stuttgart	2–1
1990–91	**Eintracht Frankfurt** (3)	Hertha BSC	8–4 aet
1991–92	**Bayer Leverkusen**	1. FC Kaiserslautern	2–1
1992–93	**Borussia Dortmund** (2)	FC Carl Zeiss Jena	5–1
1993–94	**VfB Stuttgart** (2)	Hannover 96	3–0
1994–95	**VfB Stuttgart** (3)	Hannover 96	3–1
1995–96	**Borussia Dortmund** (3)	1. FC Saarbrücken	6–1
1996–97	**FC Bayern Munich** (2)	Werder Bremen	3–0
1997–98	**Borussia Dortmund** (4)	VfB Stuttgart	2–2 aet (3–2 pen)
1998–99	**VfB Stuttgart** (4)	Borussia Dortmund	3–1
1999-00	**Hertha BSC**	FC Bayern Munich	1–0
2000–01	**FC Bayern Munich** (3)	Borussia Dortmund	4–0
2001–02	**FC Schalke 04** (2)	VfB Stuttgart	3–1 aet
2002–03	**Hertha BSC** (2)	VfB Stuttgart	4–1
2003–04	**VfB Stuttgart** (5)	Energie Cottbus	2–1
2004–05	**Hertha BSC** (3)	Hansa Rostock	2–0
2005–06	**TSV 1860 Munich**	Borussia Dortmund	2–0
2006–07	**FC Bayern Munich** (4)	Borussia Dortmund	1–0

=== Bundesliga era ===
Season	Semi-finals	Leg 1	Leg 2	Final	Result
2007–08	Hertha BSC – **TSG 1899 Hoffenheim**	1–6	3–1	**TSG 1899 Hoffenheim** – Borussia Dortmund	6–4
2007–08	1. FC Kaiserlslautern – **Borussia Dortmund**	1–3	1–0	**TSG 1899 Hoffenheim** – Borussia Dortmund	6–4
2008–09	**FC Bayern Munich** – VfL Wolfsburg	3–0	0–1	**VfB Stuttgart** (6) – FC Bayern Munich	3–1 aet
2008–09	**VfB Stuttgart** – Borussia Mönchengladbach	2–1	1–1	**VfB Stuttgart** (6) – FC Bayern Munich	3–1 aet
2009–10	VfB Stuttgart – **Bayer Leverkusen**	1–2	0–1	**Eintracht Frankfurt** (4) – Bayer Leverkusen	1–0
2009–10	**Eintracht Frankfurt** – Hertha BSC	2–1	3–1	**Eintracht Frankfurt** (4) – Bayer Leverkusen	1–0
2010–11	VfB Stuttgart – **Werder Bremen**	2–2 aet (8–9 pen)		**1. FC Köln** (2) – Werder Bremen	3–2 aet
2010–11	**1. FC Köln** – TSG 1899 Hoffenheim	3–2		**1. FC Köln** (2) – Werder Bremen	3–2 aet
2011–12	1. FC Köln – **Hertha BSC**	1–2	4–4	**Hertha BSC** (4) – VfB Stuttgart	2–0
2011–12	**VfB Stuttgart** – 1. FC Nürnberg	0–2	4–1	**Hertha BSC** (4) – VfB Stuttgart	2–0
2012–13	FC Schalke 04 – **Hertha BSC**	0–1	2–2	**VfB Stuttgart** (7) – Hertha BSC	1–0
2012–13	Werder Bremen – **VfB Stuttgart**	1–7	0–4	**VfB Stuttgart** (7) – Hertha BSC	1–0
2013–14	1. FSV Mainz 05 – **RB Leipzig**	1–1	1–2	RB Leipzig – **Borussia Dortmund** (5)	1–2
2013–14	**Borussia Dortmund** – Hertha BSC	1–2	4–0	RB Leipzig – **Borussia Dortmund** (5)	1–2
2014–15	**VfB Stuttgart** – Hannover 96	2–0	1–1	VfB Stuttgart – **Borussia Dortmund** (6)	0–4
2014–15	**Borussia Dortmund** – RB Leipzig	2–0	2–1	VfB Stuttgart – **Borussia Dortmund** (6)	0–4
2015–16	VfB Stuttgart – **Borussia Dortmund**	2–3	1–5	Borussia Dortmund – **Bayer Leverkusen** (2)	0–2
2015–16	**Bayer Leverkusen** – VfL Wolfsburg	2–2	3–2	Borussia Dortmund – **Bayer Leverkusen** (2)	0–2
2016–17	**FC Bayern Munich** – FC Schalke 04	3–0	0–1	**FC Bayern Munich** (5) – Werder Bremen	2–0
2016–17	**Werder Bremen** – Borussia Dortmund	1–1	3–0	**FC Bayern Munich** (5) – Werder Bremen	2–0
2017–18	**FC Bayern Munich** – RB Leipzig	3–0	2–0	FC Bayern Munich – **Borussia Dortmund** (7)	2–3
2017–18	Bayer Leverkusen – **Borussia Dortmund**	1–1	0–2	FC Bayern Munich – **Borussia Dortmund** (7)	2–3
2018–19	FC Bayern Munich – **1. FC Köln**	0–1	0–4	Borussia Dortmund – **1. FC Köln** (3)	2–3
2018–19	**Borussia Dortmund** – VfL Wolfsburg	2–1	2–0	Borussia Dortmund – **1. FC Köln** (3)	2–3
2021–22	**FC Schalke 04** – Fortuna Düsseldorf	3–0	3–1	**FC Schalke 04** (3) – VfB Stuttgart	1–1 aet (3–2 pen)
2021–22	**VfB Stuttgart** – Hertha BSC	1–0	2–1	**FC Schalke 04** (3) – VfB Stuttgart	1–1 aet (3–2 pen)
2022–23	**Arminia Bielefeld** – FC Schalke 04	0–1	3–1	**Arminia Bielefeld** – VfL Wolfsburg	2–1
2022–23	TSG 1899 Hoffenheim – **VfL Wolfsburg**	4–3	2–3 (4–5 pen)	**Arminia Bielefeld** – VfL Wolfsburg	2–1
2023–24	**Borussia Dortmund** – RB Leipzig	0–0	3–2	**Borussia Dortmund** (8) – Bayer Leverkusen	3–2 aet
2023–24	**Bayer Leverkusen** – Eintracht Frankfurt	2–2	2–2 (6–5 pen)	**Borussia Dortmund** (8) – Bayer Leverkusen	3–2 aet

- Winner in **bold**.
- (2) denotes the number of titles the club has won at this stage when it won more than one.
- Source: Alle B-Junioren-Meister (in German) official DFB website: List of all champions, accessed: 16 November 2008

=== Winners & Finalists ===
As of 2024, this is the standing in the all-time winners list:

**Club**	**Championships**	**Finals**
Borussia Dortmund	8	15
VfB Stuttgart	7	15
FC Bayern Munich	5	8
Eintracht Frankfurt	4	6
Hertha BSC	4	6
FC Schalke 04	3	5
1. FC Köln	3	3
Bayer Leverkusen	2	4
Hertha Zehlendorf	1	3
1. FC Kaiserslautern	1	2
TSV 1860 Munich	1	2
Arminia Bielefeld	1	1
Blau-Weiß 1890 Berlin	1	1
VfL Bochum	1	1
TSG 1899 Hoffenheim	1	1
Borussia Mönchengladbach	1	1
Bayer Uerdingen	1	1
SG Wattenscheid 09	1	1
Werder Bremen	0	4
Hannover 96	0	2
VfL Wolfsburg	0	1
RB Leipzig	0	1
FC Augsburg	0	1
Energie Cottbus	0	1
Schwarz-Weiß Essen	0	1
FC Carl Zeiss Jena	0	1
1. FC Nürnberg	0	1
Kickers Offenbach	0	1
Hansa Rostock	0	1
1. FC Saarbrücken	0	1

- On five occasions, the Bundesliga champions also won the German under 17 title:
  - 1989: FC Bayern Munich
  - 1996: Borussia Dortmund
  - 1997: FC Bayern Munich
  - 2001: FC Bayern Munich
  - 2017: FC Bayern Munich
- On two occasions, the Bundesliga champions also won the German under 17 and under 19 title:
  - 1996: Borussia Dortmund
  - 2001: FC Bayern Munich
- On four occasions, the under 19 champions also won the under 17 title:
  - 1987: Bayer Uerdingen
  - 1996: Borussia Dortmund
  - 1998: Borussia Dortmund
  - 2001: FC Bayern Munich

== Clubs & league finishes ==
The clubs and their league finishes in the Under 17 Bundesliga since 2007–08. Also shown are the final placing of the qualifying season 2006–07 and the Regionalliga or region, in color, the clubs qualified from:

=== North/Northeast ===
Club	07	08	09	10	11	12	13	14	15	16	17	18	19	20
VfL Wolfsburg	5	2	1	2	5	2	4	4	4	1	4	4	1	x
Hertha BSC	1	1	3	1	2	1	1	2	6	3	5	2	2	x
RB Leipzig						11	7	1	1	2	2	1	3	x
Hamburger SV	1	4	6	5	9	5	6	5	3	5	3	3	4	x
Werder Bremen	2	3	2	3	1	4	2	3	5	4	1	5	5	x
FC St. Pauli	9		12		7	10	10	11	9	6	6	7	6	x
1. FC Union Berlin	13			12				12		11	10	11	7	x
Hannover 96	3	6	9	7	6	3	3	8	2	12		6	8	x
Energie Cottbus	6	10	8	6	11	8	8	7	12			8	9	x
Chemnitzer FC	9												10	x
Dynamo Dresden	7	12			8	6	11	14		10	9	10	11	x
Eintracht Braunschweig	7	14						10	8	9	11	13		x
FC Carl Zeiss Jena	12			11	10	12		6	10	13				x
Hallescher FC														x
Holstein Kiel	4	11	11	13		7	5	9	13		7	9	12	
Tennis Borussia Berlin	2	8	5	10	4	13			7	8	13		13	
SC Borgfeld													14	
1. FC Magdeburg	8								11	7	8	12		
Eimsbütteler TV												14		
FC Hansa Rostock	4	5	4	4	12						12			
Niendorfer TSV											14			
VfL Osnabrück	6	7	7	8	3	9	9	13		14				
Concordia Hamburg	8		13		14				14					
FC Rot-Weiß Erfurt	5	9	10	9	13		12							
Eintracht Norderstedt							13							
VfL Oldenburg							14							
Hertha Zehlendorf			14			14								
SC Weyhe	14			14										
Sachsen Leipzig	3	13												
LTS Bremerhaven	10													
Braunschweiger SC	11													
Schleswig 06	12													
SC Langenhagen	13													
1. FC Neubrandenburg 04	10													
Tasmania Gropiusstadt	11													
Frankfurter FC Viktoria	14													

=== South/Southwest ===
Club	07	08	09	10	11	12	13	14	15	16	17	18	19	20
FC Bayern Munich	1	6	1	6	4	4	8	6	5	2	1	1	1	x
TSG 1899 Hoffenheim	5	1	6	8	2	8	5	4	2	3	8	3	2	x
Eintracht Frankfurt	2	4	10	1	3	3	9	11	11	8	5	5	3	x
1. FSV Mainz 05	3	7	12		8	6	7	1	7	9	4	4	4	x
FC Augsburg	10				11	10	10	13		4	6	10	5	x
VfB Stuttgart	3	3	2	2	1	2	1	2	1	1	2	2	6	x
Stuttgarter Kickers		12								6	11	11	7	x
1. FC Nürnberg	8	5	5	4	6	1	3	8	9	13		6	8	x
SV Wehen Wiesbaden													9	x
Karlsruher SC	7	8	8	11	9	7	11	5	3	5	3	9	10	x
SpVgg Unterhaching						12			12		10	8	11	x
SV Darmstadt 98														x
SC Freiburg	6	11	9	5	5	9	2	9	8	11	9	13		x
SpVgg Greuther Fürth			7	7	10	11	4	3	4	12				x
1. FC Heidenheim												7	12	
FC Ingolstadt 04								14					13	
SSV Ulm 1846	11		11	10	13				13				14	
1. FC Kaiserslautern	1	2	4	9	14		12	10	6	7	7	12		
SV Elversberg										14		14		
SV Sandhausen											12			
TSV 1860 Munich	4	10	3	3	7	5	6	7	10	10	13			
Kickers Offenbach	9		14								14			
1. FC Saarbrücken	2	9	13						14					
FSV Frankfurt						14		12						
SSV Jahn Regensburg		13					13							
SV Waldhof Mannheim					12		14							
SGV Freiberg						13								
SV Wacker Burghausen				12										
FK Pirmasens				13										
TuS Ergenzingen				14										
SG Rosenhöhe Offenbach		14												
TSG Backnang	12													
Borussia Neunkirchen	4													
TuS Koblenz	5													
SSV Bachem	6													
SV Gonsenheim	7													
Ludwigshafener SC	8													
Eintracht Trier	9													
TuS Mayen	10													
SV Thalexweiler	11													
Hassia Bingen	12													
SG Blaubach-Diedelkopf	13													
SG Betzdorf	14													

=== West ===
Club	07	08	09	10	11	12	13	14	15	16	17	18	19	20
Borussia Dortmund	2	1	4	5	2	3	5	1	1	1	2	1	1	x
1. FC Köln	4	7	2	4	1	1	6	7	3	9	4	5	2	x
Bayer Leverkusen	5	3	3	1	4	5	3	4	2	2	3	2	3	x
Borussia Mönchengladbach	1	2	1	3	9	4	2	5	4	6	6	4	4	x
FC Schalke 04	3	6	6	2	6	2	1	3	5	3	1	3	5	x
VfL Bochum	7	5	13		3	6	4	2	9	5	5	6	6	x
Fortuna Düsseldorf		14		13		10	12		7	10	8	8	7	x
Arminia Bielefeld	9	4	7	9	5	12		9	6	11	10	7	8	x
Preußen Münster		9	11	8	10	8	11	10	12			9	9	x
FC Hennef 05										8	13		10	x
SG Unterrath												11	11	x
Alemannia Aachen	6	11	10	10	12		9	14				14		x
SV Lippstadt 08														x
Wuppertaler SV Borussia			12		14									x
MSV Duisburg	11	8	5	6	8	7	7	6	8	4	7	10	12	
Rot-Weiss Essen	12	10	8	7	7	9	10	8	11	7	12		13	
SC Paderborn 07						13			10	12			14	
Hombrucher SV											11	12		
FC Viktoria Köln									13		9	13		
1. FC Mönchengladbach											14			
Rot-Weiß Oberhausen							13			13				
Sportfreunde Siegen							14			14				
Euskirchner TSC								11	14					
Bonner SC	10	12		12		11	8	12						
BV 04 Düsseldorf								13						
SV Bergisch Gladbach 09					11	14								
SG Wattenscheid 09	8	13		11	13									
Sportfreunde Troisdorf			9	14										
TSC Eintracht 48/95 Dortmund			14											

=== Key ===
League champions
League runners-up

Region of origin
North
Northeast
South
Southwest
West

== Top scorers ==
The league's top scorers:

=== North/Northeast ===
The top scorers of the North/Northeast division:

Season	Player	Club	Goals
2007–08	(Germany) Abu-Bakarr Kargbo (Germany) Mario Petry	Hertha BSC VfL Wolfsburg	17
2008–09	(Germany) Lennart Thy	Werder Bremen	28
2009–10	(Germany) Moritz Göttel	VfL Wolfsburg	21
2010–11	(Germany) Malte Nieweler	VfL Osnabrück	16
2011–12	(Germany) Federico Palacios-Martinez	VfL Wolfsburg	26
2012–13	(Germany) Nico Empen (Poland) Oskar Zawada	Holstein Kiel VfL Wolfsburg	18
2013–14	(Germany) Johannes Eggestein	Werder Bremen	20
2014–15	(Germany) Johannes Eggestein	Werder Bremen	22
2015–16	(Germany) David Nieland	VfL Wolfsburg	21
2016–17	(Germany) Jann-Fiete Arp	Hamburger SV	26
2017–18	(Germany) Lazar Samardžić	Hertha BSC	24
2018–19	(Germany) Emincan Tekin	Hertha BSC	26

=== South/Southwest ===
The top scorers of the South/Southwest division:

Season	Player	Club	Goals
2007–08	(Germany) Marco Terrazzino	TSG 1899 Hoffenheim	20
2008–09	(Germany) Pascal Breier	VfB Stuttgart	21
2009–10	(Germany) Patrick Schmidt	VfB Stuttgart	23
2010–11	(Turkey) Kenan Karaman	TSG 1899 Hoffenheim	14
2011–12	(Germany) Timo Werner	VfB Stuttgart	24
2012–13	(Austria) Adrian Grbić	VfB Stuttgart	21
2013–14	(Germany) Prince Owusu	VfB Stuttgart	23
2014–15	(Germany) Meris Skenderović	TSG 1899 Hoffenheim	30
2015–16	(Germany) Manuel Wintzheimer	FC Bayern Munich	22
2016–17	(Germany) Maurice Malone	FC Augsburg	24
2017–18	(Germany) Leon Dajaku	VfB Stuttgart	23
2018–19	(Germany) Maximilian Beier	TSG 1899 Hoffenheim	18

=== West ===
The top scorers of the West division:

Season	Player	Club	Goals
2007–08	(Germany) Daniel Ginczek	Borussia Dortmund	26
2008–09	(Germany) Christopher Mandiangu (Germany) Elias Kachunga	Borussia Mönchengladbach	17
2009–10	(Germany) Kolja Pusch	Bayer Leverkusen	20
2010–11	(Germany) Marvin Ducksch	Borussia Dortmund	33
2011–12	(Germany) Julien Rybacki	MSV Duisburg	10
2012–13	(Germany) Donis Avdijaj	FC Schalke 04	44
2013–14	(Germany) Cagatay Kader	VfL Bochum	20
2014–15	(Germany) Felix Käfferbitz	FC Schalke 04	21
2015–16	(Germany) Florian Krüger	FC Schalke 04	35
2016–17	(Germany) Roberto Massimo	Arminia Bielefeld	16
2017–18	(Germany) Youssoufa Moukoko	Borussia Dortmund	37
2018–19	(Germany) Youssoufa Moukoko	Borussia Dortmund	46
