= FC Eintracht Bamberg =

German football club

- Full name: Fußball-Club Eintracht Bamberg 2010 e. V.
- Founded: 2006; 2010 (refounded)
- Ground: Fuchs-Park-Stadion
- Capacity: 5,200
- Chairman: Wolfgang Schauer
- Manager: Jan Gernlein
- League: Bayernliga Nord (V)
- 2025–26: Bayernliga Nord, 5th of 18
Home colours	Away colours

FC Eintracht Bamberg is a German association football club from the city of Bamberg, Bavaria. The footballers are part of a sports club formed on 1 April 2006 out of the union of 1. FC Bamberg and TSV Eintracht Bamberg. With over 1,500 members it is one of the largest sports associations in the Upper Franconia region of the state and has departments for bowling, karate, gymnastics, table tennis, tennis, and volleyball.

== History ==
The two founding clubs initially held discussions around the possibility of a merger in the summer of 2005, but the talks failed when the proposal did not receive the necessary three-quarters majority support of the membership of TSV Eintracht. In January 2006, after another half-year of discussion and lobbying, Eintracht's membership overwhelmingly agreed to the merger, while the membership of FC Bamberg followed suit in March.

The newly merged side took up the place of FC in the Bayernliga (IV) and earned an unexpectedly good 5th place result. In the following season, the club stayed on course for a top-four finish, which would have meant Regionalliga Süd qualification, for most of the season but failed in the end, finishing fifth again. However, the insolvency of the Sportfreunde Siegen and the fact that the SpVgg Bayreuth was refused a licence meant, Bamberg did still move up to the Regionalliga.

The club finished in mid-table in the 2008–09 Regionalliga season. The club had to declare insolvency at the end of the 2009–10 season and folded. However, a new club was formed immediately under the name of FC Eintracht Bamberg 2010 and entered the Bayernliga for 2010–11.

At the end of the 2011–12 season the club managed to finish in the top nine of the Bayernliga and thereby directly qualified for the new tier four Regionalliga Bayern. In this league the club finished 13th and 10th in its first two seasons there. The team came last in the league in 2014–15 and was relegated from the Regionalliga to the Bayernliga where it came last once more in the following season and was relegated to the Landesliga. The club had to declare insolvency once more in March 2016.

== Stadium ==
1. FC Eintracht Bamberg plays in the Fuchs-Park-Stadion (previously Hauptkampfbahn im Volkspark) which served as the home ground of FC prior to the merger. The stadium was opened in 1926 and expanded in 1938 to accommodate 22,600 spectators. The record attendance of 27,000 was established in an amateur contest between Germany and France (1:1) on 2 May 1964.

== Honours ==
The club's honours:

=== League ===
==== 1. FC Eintracht Bamberg ====
- Amateurliga Bayern (III)
  - Champions: 1946, 1948 (N), 1950, 1957 (N), 1958 (N), 1963 (N)
  - Runners-up: 1961 (N)
- Landesliga Bayern-Nord (IV)
  - Champions: 1975, 1981
  - Runners-up: 2004, 2006
- Bezirksoberliga Oberfranken (V-VI)
  - Champions: 2008^{‡}
  - Runners-up: 1992, 1997
- (N) = Northern division

==== Eintracht Bamberg ====
- Landesliga Bayern-Nordost (VI)
  - Champions: 2019
- Bezirksliga Oberfranken West (VII)
  - Champions: 2018^{‡}

=== Cup ===
- Oberfranken Cup
  - Winners: 2002

=== Youth ===
- Bavarian Under 19 championship
  - Runners-up: 2006
- Bavarian Under 17 championship
  - Runners-up: 2004
- ^{‡} Reserve team

== Players ==
As of 2 January 2025

Note: Flags indicate national team as defined under FIFA eligibility rules; some limited exceptions apply. Players may hold more than one non-FIFA nationality.

No.	Pos.	Nation	Player
1	GK	GER	Fabian Dellermann
5	MF	GER	Luca Auer
6	MF	GER	Simon Kollmer
7	MF	GER	Andreas Pfahlmann
8	DF	GER	Marco Schmitt
9	FW	GER	Tim Strasser
10	FW	POL	Lukasz Jankowiak
11	DF	GER	Tobias Linz
12	DF	GER	Sebastian Valdez
13	MF	GER	Andreas Mahr
14	FW	GER	Luis Schneider
15	MF	GER	Fabio Reck
16	MF	GER	Luca Leistner

No.	Pos.	Nation	Player
17	FW	GER	Björn Schönwiesner
18	DF	GER	Marc Reischmann
19	FW	GER	David Lang
20	FW	NGR	Muiz Alli
21	GK	GER	Ben Olschewski
22	FW	BLR	Rodion Gushcha
23	DF	GER	Robin Zeitler
24	DF	GER	Christopher Kettler
25	MF	GER	Koray Kaiser
29	MF	GER	Luca Ljevsic
30	MF	GER	Nico Baumgartl
34	GK	GER	Benedikt Willert
35	DF	GER	Jonas Hartwig

== Recent managers ==
Recent managers of the club:

Manager	Start	Finish
Ulrich Pechtold	1 July 1996	30 June 2005
Christoph Starke	1 July 2005	15 December 2009
Dieter Kurth	6 January 2010	30 June 2010
Christoph Starke	1 July 2010	30 June 2012
Petr Skarabela	1 July 2012	28 March 2013
Dieter Kurth	29 March 2013	18 September 2013
Hans-Jürgen Heidenreich	19 September 2013	June 2014
Roberto Pätzold	July 2014	18 October 2014
Tobias Fuchs	19 October 2014	4 December 2014
Norbert Schlegel	5 December 2014	27 October 2015
Petr Skarabela	27 October 2015	30 June 2016
Georg Lunz	1 July 2016	4 April 2017
Michael Hutzler	1 July 2017	30 June 2021
Julian Kolbeck	1 July 2021	30 June 2022
Jan Gernlein	1 July 2022	Present

== Recent seasons ==
The recent season-by-season performance of the club:

=== 1. FC Bamberg ===
The final placings of 1. FC Bamberg:

Year	Division	Tier	Position
1999–2000	Landesliga Bayern-Nord	V	4th
2000–01	Landesliga Bayern-Nord	V	6th
2001–02	Landesliga Bayern-Nord	V	6th
2002–03	Landesliga Bayern-Nord	V	4th
2003–04	Landesliga Bayern-Nord	V	2nd
2004–05	Landesliga Bayern-Nord	V	4th
2005–06	Landesliga Bayern-Nord	V	2nd ↑

=== Eintracht Bamberg ===
Year	Division	Tier	Position
2006–07	Bayernliga	IV	5th
2007–08	Bayernliga	IV	5th ↑
2008–09	Regionalliga Süd	IV	10th
2009–10	Regionalliga Süd	IV	17th ↓
2010–11	Bayernliga	V	8th
2011–12	Bayernliga	V	8th ↑
2012–13	Regionalliga Bayern	IV	13th
2013–14	Regionalliga Bayern	IV	10th
2014–15	Regionalliga Bayern	IV	18th ↓
2015–16	Bayernliga Nord	V	18th ↓
2016–17	Landesliga Bayern-Nordwest	VI	17th ↓
2017–18	Bezirksliga Oberfranken West	VII	1st ↑
2018–19	Landesliga Bayern-Nordost	VI	1st ↑
2019–21	Bayernliga Nord	V	7th
2021–22	Bayernliga Nord	V	4th
2022–23	Bayernliga Nord	V	1st ↑
2023–24	Regionalliga Bayern	IV	15th
2024–25	Regionalliga Bayern	IV	17th ↓
2025–26	Bayernliga Nord	V	5th

=== Reserve team ===
Season	Division	Tier	Position
2006–07	Bezirksliga Oberfranken-West	VII	1st ↑
2007–08	Bezirksoberliga Oberfranken	VI	1st ↑
2008–09	Landesliga Bayern-Nord	VI	12th
2009–10	Landesliga Bayern-Nord	VI	11th ↓
2010–11	A-Klasse Bamberg-Bayreuth 4	XI	2nd ↑
2011–12	Kreisklasse Bamberg 2	X	11th
2012–13	Kreisklasse Bamberg 1	IX	4th
2013–14	Kreisklasse Bamberg 1	IX	12th
2014–15	Kreisklasse Bamberg 1	IX	7th
2015–16	Kreisklasse Bamberg 1	IX	1st ↑
2016–17	Kreisliga Bamberg	VIII	16th ↓
2017–18	did not compete		
2018–19	did not compete		
2019–21	did not compete		
2021–22	Kreisklasse Bamberg 1	X	5th
2022–23	Kreisklasse Bamberg 1	X	

- With the introduction of the Bezirksoberligas in 1988 as the new fifth tier, below the Landesligas, all leagues below dropped one tier. With the introduction of the Regionalligas in 1994 and the 3. Liga in 2008 as the new third tier, below the 2. Bundesliga, all leagues below dropped one tier. With the establishment of the Regionalliga Bayern as the new fourth tier in Bavaria in 2012 the Bayernliga was split into a northern and a southern division, the number of Landesligas expanded from three to five and the Bezirksoberligas abolished. All leagues from the Bezirksligas onwards were elevated one tier.

↑ Promoted	↓ Relegated
