= Matthias Küfner =

German footballer

Personal information
- Date of birth: 28 April 1981 (age 45)
- Place of birth: Bayreuth, West Germany
- Height: 1.84 m (6 ft 1/2 in)
- Position: Goalkeeper

Youth career
- BSV Bayreuth
- –1997: SpVgg Bayreuth
- 1997–2000: Bayern Munich

Senior career*
Years	Team	Apps	(Gls)
2000–2001	Bayern Munich (A)	3	(0)
2001–2003	Wacker Burghausen	7	(0)
2003–2004	1860 München	0	(0)
2004–2007	Hallescher FC	80	(0)
2007–2008	Bayern Hof		
2008–2009	1. FC Schweinfurt 05	35	(0)
2009–2015	TSV Neudrossenfeld	161	(0)
- * Club domestic league appearances and goals

Matthias Küfner (born 28 April 1981) is a German footballer who plays as a goalkeeper.

Küfner played as a youth for various clubs in his hometown of Bayreuth, before joining Bayern Munich at age 16. He spent three years in the youth team, before stepping up to the reserve team in 2000. He made three appearances in the 2000–01 season, his debut coming as a substitute for Stefan Wessels in a 3–0 defeat against Karlsruher SC. At the end of the season, Küfner joined Wacker Burghausen, as understudy to Kay Wehner. His first season ended with the club winning the Regionalliga Süd, which enabled him to make five appearances in the 2. Bundesliga the following year.

In 2003, Küfner returned to Munich, to join Bundesliga side 1860 München, where he spent a year as third choice 'keeper. This was followed by three years with Hallescher FC in the NOFV-Oberliga Süd, before he returned to Bavaria for a six-month spell at SpVgg Bayern Hof, then eighteen months with 1. FC Schweinfurt 05. He left Schweinfurt in 2009 to join amateur side TSV Neudrossenfeld.
