= Daniel Jungwirth =

German footballer

Personal information
- Date of birth: 15 January 1982 (age 44)
- Place of birth: Munich, West Germany
- Height: 1.77 m (5 ft 10 in)
- Position: Attacking midfielder

Youth career
- FC Ismaning
- –2000: Bayern Munich

Senior career*
Years	Team	Apps	(Gls)
2000–2003	Borussia M'gladbach II	26	(1)
2003–2005	Bayern Munich II	39	(3)
2005–2007	Erzgebirge Aue	17	(0)
2007–2009	FC Ingolstadt	60	(8)
2009–2011	SV Sandhausen	46	(5)
2012–2014	SV Elversberg	64	(7)
2014–2015	FC Erding	28	(8)
2015–2016	FC Unterföhring	31	(10)
Total		311	(42)

International career
- Germany Youth

Managerial career
- 2018–2019: Türkgücü München (assistant)
- 2019–2020: SV Planegg-Krailling (youth)
- 2020–2021: Germany U19 (assistant)
- 2021–2024: Germany U20 (assistant)
- 2024–2026: VfB Stuttgart (U-17)
- 2026: SSV Ulm
- * Club domestic league appearances and goals

Daniel Jungwirth (born 15 January 1982) is a German former professional footballer who played as an attacking midfielder.
