= Florian Heller =

German football coach and former player

Personal information
- Date of birth: 10 March 1982 (age 44)
- Place of birth: Rosenheim, West Germany
- Height: 1.79 m (5 ft 10 in)
- Position: Midfielder

Team information
- Current team: SpVgg Unterhaching U17 (manager)

Youth career
- 1986–1992: SV Pang
- 1992–1998: TSV 1860 Rosenheim
- 1998–2000: Bayern Munich

Senior career*
Years	Team	Apps	(Gls)
2000–2003	Bayern Munich II	57	(5)
2003–2005	Greuther Fürth	42	(1)
2005–2008	Erzgebirge Aue	76	(12)
2008–2012	Mainz 05	79	(3)
2012–2013	FC Ingolstadt	32	(2)
2013–2014	TSV 1860 Rosenheim	7	(1)
2014	SpVgg Unterhaching	8	(1)
Total		301	(25)

Managerial career
- 2014: SpVgg Unterhaching U17 (assistant)
- 2014–: SpVgg Unterhaching U17
- * Club domestic league appearances and goals

Florian Heller (born 10 March 1982) is a German football coach and former player who played as a midfielder. He is the manager of SpVgg Unterhaching U17.

He made his debut on the professional league level in the 2. Bundesliga for Greuther Fürth on 3 August 2003 when he came on as a substitute in the 72nd minute in the game against SpVgg Unterhaching.
