= Sebastian Backer =

German footballer (born 1980)

Personal information
- Date of birth: 5 September 1980 (age 46)
- Place of birth: Munich, West Germany
- Height: 1.81 m (5 ft 11 1/2 in)
- Position: Defender

Team information
- Current team: ASV Dachau

Youth career
- –1988: TSV Zorneding
- 1988–1998: Bayern Munich

Senior career*
Years	Team	Apps	(Gls)
1998–2001	Bayern Munich (A)	71	(4)
2000–2001	Bayern Munich	0	(0)
2001–2003	MSV Duisburg	4	(0)
2003–2005	Eintracht Braunschweig	8	(0)
2005–2007	SC Fürstenfeldbruck	51	(8)
2007–2008	SV Heimstetten	8	(0)
2008–	ASV Dachau		
Total		142	(12)

International career
1997	Germany U-16	7	(3)
1997–1998	Germany U-17	14	(0)
- * Club domestic league appearances and goals

Sebastian Backer (born 5 September 1980) is a German footballer who plays as a defender.

Born in Munich, Backer spent thirteen years with FC Bayern, ten in the club's youth system and three in the reserve team in the Regionalliga Süd. In the 2000–01 season, Ottmar Hitzfeld made Backer a member of the first-team squad, where he was given the number 29, but didn't make a first-team appearance, and continued to play for the reserves.

In 2001, Backer signed for MSV Duisburg of the 2. Bundesliga, but made no appearances in his first season, and only four in his second, his debut coming against Alemannia Aachen in September 2002. He spent the next two years with Eintracht Braunschweig of the Regionalliga Nord, but these were similarly unproductive with only ten appearances (eight in the league, two in the cup), and left in 2005, despite Eintracht's promotion to the second tier.

Backer returned to Bavaria to play semi-professional football, with SC Fürstenfeldbruck, SV Heimstetten and lately ASV Dachau. Since 2008, he has combined this with coaching Bayern Munich's under-11s team.

Backer represented the German youth team at various levels, his biggest success being third place at the 1997 UEFA Under-16 Championship in Germany in 1997.
