= Borut Semler =

Slovenian footballer

Personal information
- Full name: Borut Semler
- Date of birth: 25 February 1985 (age 41)
- Place of birth: Murska Sobota, SFR Yugoslavia
- Height: 1.75 m (5 ft 9 in)
- Position: Attacking midfielder

Youth career
- 1995–1999: Mura
- 1999–2001: Varteks
- 2001–2004: Bayern Munich

Senior career*
| Years | Team | Apps | (Gls) |
| 2004–2007 | Bayern Munich II | 48 | (10) |
| 2007–2008 | Varteks | 25 | (5) |
| 2008 | Domžale | 12 | (0) |
| 2008–2009 | Drava Ptuj | 47 | (9) |
| 2010–2011 | Mordovia Saransk | 32 | (1) |
| 2011–2012 | Kaisar | 27 | (2) |
| 2012 | Akzhayik | 17 | (3) |
| 2013 | Shakhter Karagandy | 3 | (0) |
| 2013 | → Kaisar (loan) | 22 | (10) |
| 2014–2015 | Akzhayik | 16 | (9) |
| 2015 | Spartak Semey | 3 | (1) |
| 2015–2016 | Dob | 11 | (3) |
| 2016 | SC Weiz | 12 | (0) |
| 2016–2018 | FC Bad Radkersburg | 17 | (3) |
| 2018 | SV Feldbach | 13 | (3) |
| 2019 | SV Kaindorf/Sulm | 12 | (6) |
| 2019–2021 | USV Hengsberg | 21 | (3) |

International career
| 2001 | Slovenia U15 | 3 | (0) |
| 2000–2001 | Slovenia U16 | 10 | (5) |
| 2004 | Slovenia U19 | 1 | (0) |
| 2004–2006 | Slovenia U21 | 6 | (3) |
| 2004–2007 | Slovenia | 7 | (0) |

Managerial career
- 2016–2017: FC Bad Radkersburg (youth coach)
- 2018: SV Feldbach (player-assistant)
- * Club domestic league appearances and goals

Borut Semler (born 25 February 1985) is a Slovenian footballer.

== Career ==
He started his career playing in youth systems of Slovenian side NK Mura and Croatian side NK Varteks before moving to Bayern Munich's youth system in the summer of 2001. He started to play for Bayern Munich's reserve squad in the Regionalliga Süd, the third tier of German football in May 2004 and made his debut for the team in their second-last match of the 2003–04 season, a 3–0 away victory against the reserve squad of 1. FSV Mainz 05. It took him only two minutes to score his first goal for the team as he increased their lead on 2–0 after coming off the bench as a substitute for Erdal Kilicaslan for the final 15 minutes of the match. He played regularly for the team in the following season and scored nine goals in 27 matches. In the 2005–06 season, however, he only made 13 appearances for the team without scoring any goals. In the following season he had seven appearances, but again didn't manage to get on the score sheet. He returned to his youth club Varteks on 18 January 2007. He scored two goals for the club in the Croatian First League in thirteen games. In January 2008 he went back to Slovenia and first signed for NK Domžale, before he was transferred to NK Drava Ptuj in August that year.

== International career ==
Semler has played for Slovenian under-21 team and the senior national team. He made his debut for the Slovenian senior team on 18 August 2004 in a 1–1 draw against Serbia and Montenegro, coming off the bench as a late substitute. He has been capped seven times for the national team between 2004 and 2007.
