= Michael Wagner (footballer, born 2000) =

German footballer (born 2000)

Personal information
- Full name: Michael Christian Wagner
- Date of birth: 26 July 2000 (age 26)
- Place of birth: Munich, Germany
- Height: 1.87 m (6 ft 2 in)
- Position: Goalkeeper

Team information
- Current team: FV Illertissen
- Number: 1

Youth career
- –2010: SV Heimstetten
- 2011–2019: Bayern Munich

Senior career*
Years	Team	Apps	(Gls)
2017–2021	Bayern Munich II	8	(0)
2021–2022	Türkgücü München	1	(0)
2022–	FV Illertissen	8	(0)
- * Club domestic league appearances and goals as of 19:39, 23 September 2022 (UTC)

Michael Christian Wagner (born 26 July 2000) is a German professional footballer who plays as a goalkeeper for Regionalliga Bayern club FV Illertissen.

== Career ==
Wagner made his debut for Bayern Munich II in the Regionalliga Bayern on 25 August 2017, coming on as a substitute in the 9th minute for outfielder Resul Türkkalesi against FC Augsburg II, as starting goalkeeper Christian Früchtl was sent off two minutes prior. The away match finished as a 1–5 loss. He made four appearances during the following season, but did not play for the second team during the 2019–20 season. He later made his debut for the team in the 3. Liga on 7 February 2021, starting in a home match against KFC Uerdingen.

On 19 April 2021, it was announced that Wagner would not resign with FC Bayern after spending ten years with the reigning champions and that he intended to join Türkgücü München. No details were provided regarding the term of the contract.

Wagner joined Regionalliga Bayern club FV Illertissen on 2 June 2022.

== Career statistics ==
As of match played 23 August 2022

Appearances and goals by club, season and competition
Club	Season	League			Cup		Total		Ref.
Club	Season	Division	Apps	Goals	Apps	Goals	Apps	Goals	Ref.
Bayern Munich II	2017–18	Regionalliga Bayern	1	0	—		1	0	
Bayern Munich II	2018–19	Regionalliga Bayern	4	0	—		4	0	
Bayern Munich II	2019–20	3. Liga	0	0	—		0	0	
Bayern Munich II	2020–21	3. Liga	3	0	—		3	0	
Bayern Munich II	Total		8	0	—		8	0	—
Türkgücü München	2021–22	3. Liga	1	0	0	0	1	0	
FV Illertissen	2022–23	Regionalliga Bayern	8	0	1	0	9	0	
Career Total			17	0	1	0	18	0	—
