= Leonhard Haas =

German footballer

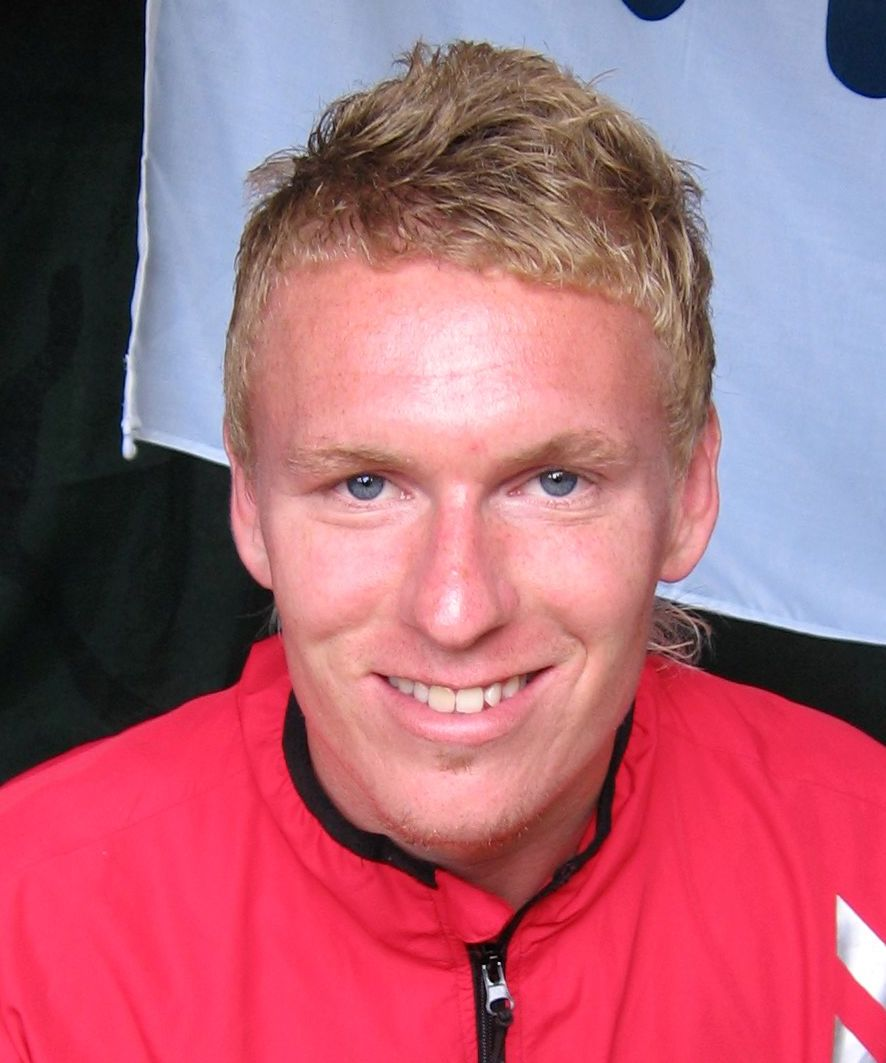

Personal information
- Date of birth: 19 January 1982 (age 44)
- Place of birth: Rosenheim, West Germany
- Height: 1.82 m (6 ft 0 in)
- Position: Midfielder

Team information
- Current team: Bayern Munich U19 (manager)

Youth career
- SV Ramerberg
- 1860 Rosenheim
- –1998: 1860 Munich
- 1998–2001: Bayern Munich

Senior career*
Years	Team	Apps	(Gls)
2001–2004	Bayern Munich II	31	(4)
2004–2005	Hamburger SV II	31	(10)
2004–2005	Hamburger SV	0	(0)
2005–2007	FC Augsburg	24	(7)
2007–2011	Greuther Fürth	89	(11)
2011–2012	FC Ingolstadt 04	11	(0)
2012–2014	Hansa Rostock	48	(1)
2015–2018	TSV Wasserburg	8	(0)
Total		242	(33)

Managerial career
- 2015–2019: TSV Wasserburg
- 2019–2022: Wacker Burghausen
- 2024: Greuther Fürth
- 2025–2026: Bayern Munich U17
- 2026–: Bayern Munich U19
- * Club domestic league appearances and goals

Leonhard Haas (born 19 January 1982, in Rosenheim) is a German professional football manager and former player, who currently works as the head coach for the under-19 team of Bundesliga club Bayern Munich.
