= José Luis Ortiz =

Bolivian footballer (born 1985)

Personal information
- Full name: José Luis Ortiz Melgar
- Date of birth: 17 November 1985 (age 40)
- Place of birth: Santa Cruz de la Sierra, Bolivia
- Height: 1.73 m (5 ft 8 in)
- Position: Central midfielder

Youth career
- Tahuichi Academy
- 2001–2004: Bayern Munich

Senior career*
Years	Team	Apps	(Gls)
2004–2006	FC Bayern Munich II	28	(5)
2006–2007	Saarbrücken	2	(0)
2007–2008	Nafta Lendava	22	(1)
2008–2009	La Paz	10	(1)
2009	Santa Cruz de la Sierra		
2010	Real Potosí		

International career^{‡}
2003	Bolivia U20		
- * Club domestic league appearances and goals as of 30 September 2011 ‡ National team caps and goals as of 30 September 2011

José Luis Ortiz Melgar (born 17 November 1985) is a Bolivian professional football midfielder who most recently played for Real Potosí.

== Club career ==
After playing in the youth teams of Bayern Munich that discovered him in Tahuichi Academy in Bolivia, he played as senior with Saarbrücken, Slovenian Nafta Lendava, Bolivia Bolívar, Oriente Petrolero y Real Potosí in the Bolivian Primera División.

== International career ==
José Luis Ortiz was part of the Bolivian team at the 2003 South American Youth Championship.

== Honours ==
FC Bayern Munich II

- IFA Shield: 2005

== External sources ==
- José Luis Ortiz at WorldFootball.net
- José Luis Ortiz at fussballdaten.de (in German)
