= Timo Heinze =

German footballer

Personal information
- Date of birth: 23 February 1986 (age 40)
- Place of birth: Rosenheim, West Germany
- Height: 1.71 m (5 ft 7 in)
- Position: Defender

Youth career
- SV Westerndorf
- –1998: 1860 Rosenheim
- 1998–2004: Bayern Munich

Senior career*
Years	Team	Apps	(Gls)
2004–2009	Bayern Munich II	79	(0)
2009–2010	SpVgg Unterhaching	5	(0)
2011	Fortuna Köln	8	(0)
Total		92	(0)

International career
2001–2002	Germany U16	10	(0)
2001–2002	Germany Youth	13	(0)
- * Club domestic league appearances and goals

Timo Heinze (born 23 February 1986 in Rosenheim, Bavaria) is a German retired footballer who last played for Fortuna Köln.

== Career ==
Heinze began his career with SC Westerndorf before joining TSV 1860 Rosenheim. In 1998, after six years with TSV 1860 Rosenheim he signed a youth contract with FC Bayern Munich and was promoted to the reserve team in 2004. In 2009, Heinze left FC Bayern Munich the club and signed for local rivals SpVgg Unterhaching on a three-year contract. He left the club after one year. After a year without a club, he signed for Fortuna Köln in 2011. He retired after the season.

== International career ==
Heinze is a former Germany national youth football team levels player in 23 games.

== Personal life ==
Heinze was born in Rosenheim, Bavaria. Heinze wrote a book called "Injury time. An unfinished football career."

== Career statistics ==
As of 25 May 2012.

Club performance			League		Cup		Total	
Club	League	Season	Apps	Goals	Apps	Goals	Apps	Goals
Germany			League		DFB-Pokal		Total	
Bayern Munich II	Regionalliga Süd	2004–05	5	0	0	0	5	0
Bayern Munich II	Regionalliga Süd	2005–06	1	0	—		1	0
Bayern Munich II	Regionalliga Süd	2006–07	23	0	—		23	0
Bayern Munich II	Regionalliga Süd	2007–08	18	0	—		18	0
Bayern Munich II	3. Liga	2008–09	32	0	—		32	0
SpVgg Unterhaching	3. Liga	2009–10	5	0	1	0	6	0
No Club		2010–11	—		—		—	
Fortuna Köln	Regionalliga West	2011–12	8	0	—		8	0
Career statistics			92	0	1	0	93	0
