= SpVgg Bayern Hof =

- Full name: Spielvereinigung Bayern Hof e. V.
- Founded: 2005
- Ground: Stadion Grüne Au
- Capacity: 9,000
- Chairman: Tim Wonsack
- Manager: Henrik Schödel
- League: Bayernliga Nord (V)
- 2025–26: Bayernliga Nord, 10th of 18
Home colours	Away colours	Third colours

SpVgg Bayern Hof is a German association football club based in Hof, Bavaria.

== History ==
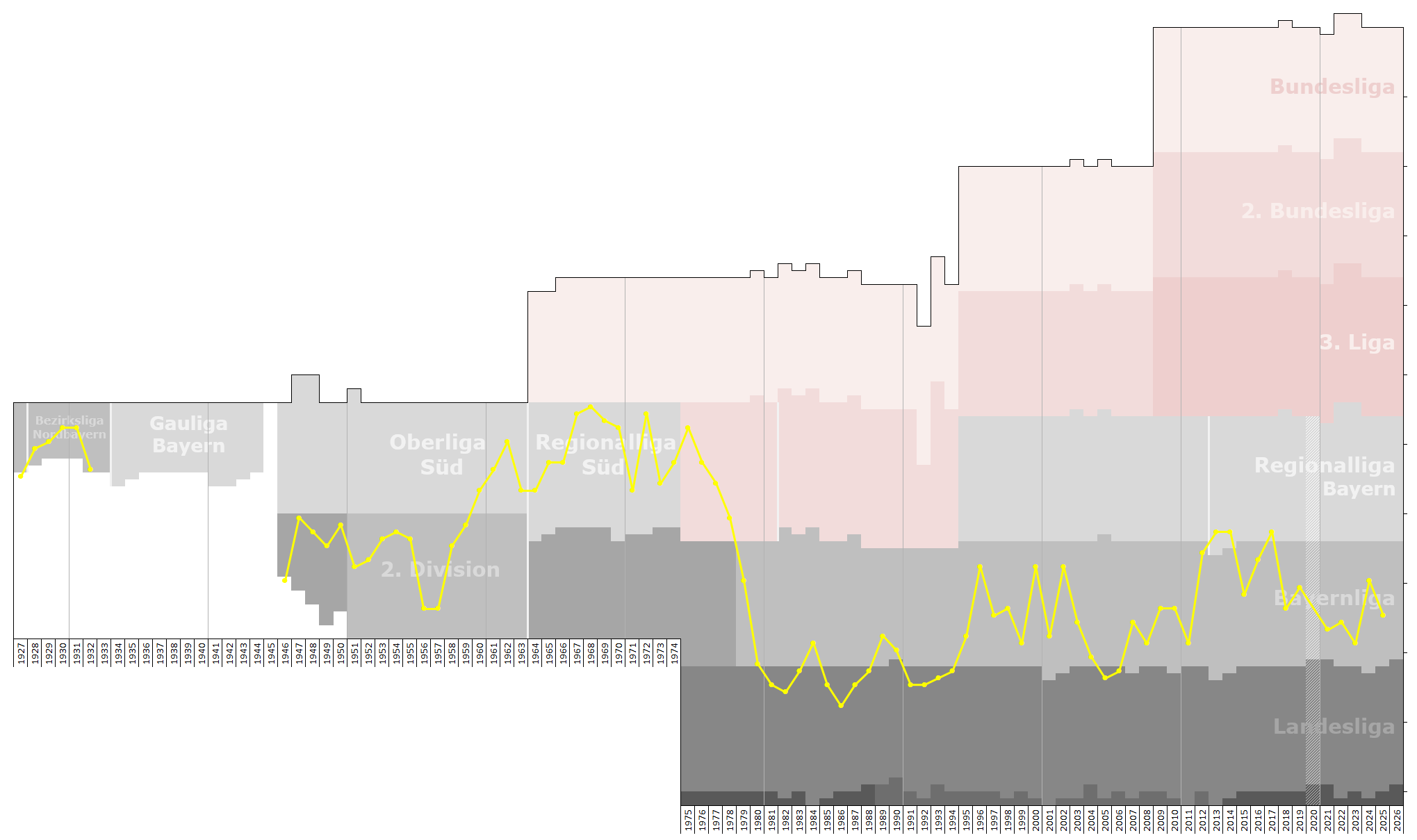
Historical chart of the club's league performance

The club's predecessor was founded on 1 June 1910 as Ballspielclub Hof, but within a year was renamed Britannia Hof. In 1913, they merged with FC Roland Hof and FC Phoenix Hof to become FC Bayern Hof.

FC Bayern Hof was a decent, but unremarkable, local side through its early decades. It spent five seasons in the tier-one Bezirksliga Bayern from 1927. In 1944, the team won promotion to the Gauliga Bayern, Staffel Oberfranken, one of sixteen top flight division that had been created in 1933 in the re-organization of German football under the Third Reich. However, by that time World War II had overtaken that part of the country and Gauliga play was ended there in the fall.

After the war Bayern Hof advanced to the Landesliga Bayern (II) in 1946 where they came out on top of the Staffel Nordbayern only to lose the divisional playoff to Wacker München (3–4, 0–4). League re-structuring saw the club in the 2. Oberliga Süd (II) to open the 1951–52 season. They remained competitive throughout the decade, generally finishing in the top half of the table.

A second-place result in 1959 put the club into Oberliga Süd (I) to play first division football for the first time. They managed only middling results against the stronger, better established teams there and so did not qualify for play in the Bundesliga – Germany's new professional league – when it was established in 1963. BH played in the Regionalliga Süd (II) and through the late 1960s and into the early 1970s, the team played good football and earned some solid finishes – including a division title in 1968 – but failed in three tries to make it through the promotion rounds to the new top division in 1967, 1968 and 1972.

In the pre-season 1969–70 Bayern Hof had a taste of international football as they took part in the 1969 Cup of the Alps. They hosted three games at their Stadion Grüne Au against Hellas Verona, Lausanne Sports and Bologna.

In 1978, they slipped to the tier-three Bayernliga and began a descent that would land them in Landesliga Bayern-Nord (IV) by 1980. In the next fourteen seasons until 1994, the club existed as an elevator side between the Landesliga and Oberliga, playing in the later in 1983–84 and 1988–1990 while generally finishing in the top-three in the Landesliga in the other seasons. It made a more permanent return to the Oberliga Bayern in 1994, when the new Regionalliga Süd was formed and the best teams from the Bayernliga entered the new league.

A decade in the Bayernliga saw the club finish fourth three times, in 1996, 2000 and 2002, but, in 2004, it was relegated again. In 2005 FC Bayern Hof merged with SpVgg Hof to form SpVgg Bayern Hof. SpVgg Hof was formed in 1893 as the football department of the gymnastics club TV Hof, itself founded in 1861. The footballers became independent in 1924 and were distinguished only by single season appearances in the top flight in 1921 and 1929, and an advance to the Amateurliga Bayern for the 1966–67 season.

In 2006 the newly unified club captured the division title in the Landesliga Bayern-Nord (V) and were promoted to the fourth division Bayernliga. A difficult 2007–08 season saw the club in deep relegation trouble all season but eventually they managed to climb one rank above the relegation zone and survive.

After two better seasons, the club once more played against relegation in 2010–11, having to face SpVgg Bayreuth in a decider, which Hof won 2–1 in extra time to qualify for the Bayernliga promotion round against the Landesliga runners-up. In this game, a 1–0 victory over Jahn Regensburg II proved enough to maintain its league status. The following season, Hof was a strong contender for the league title, eventually coming second to TSV 1860 Rosenheim and earning promotion to the new Regionalliga Bayern. The club was however criticised by the BFV for its desolate second team which, uniquely for a Regionalliga team, was relegated from the ninth tier in 2011–12 and completely withdrawn for 2012–13. Hof answered this with an open letter to the association, pointing out the club's excellent and extensive youth program and the fact that fielding a second team would still cost it €60,000 to 80,000 per season in the Bezirksliga, an amount the club was unwilling to spend. In the 2012–13 season the club had to struggle against relegation all season and beyond, having to defend its league place in the relegation round with the Bayernliga runners-up. In a two-leg play-off against TSV Großbardorf Hof defended its league place with an aggregate score of 8–4. the following season the club finished 17th once more but this time was directly relegated back to the Bayernliga. Hof finished third in the Bayernliga in 2015–16 and qualified for the promotion round to the Regionaliga where it defeated Viktoria Aschaffenburg and returned to the fourth tier, only to be relegated a season later.

== Honours ==
The club's honours:

=== League ===
- 2. Oberliga Süd (II)
  - Runners-up: 1959
- Regionalliga Süd (II)
  - Champions: 1968
  - Runners-up (2): 1967, 1972
- Landesliga Bayern (II)
  - Champions: 1947
  - Runners-up: 1950
- Bayernliga
  - Runners-up: 2012
- Landesliga Bayern-Nord
  - Champions (5): 1966^{‡}, 1983, 1988, 1994, 2006
  - Runners-up (2): 1993, 2005
- 2. Amateurliga Oberfranken Ost (IV)
  - Champions: 1955^{‡}

=== Cup ===
- German Cup
  - Last sixteen: 1975–76
- Oberfranken Cup
  - Winner (3): 1996, 2000, 2004

=== Youth ===
- Bavarian Under 19 championship
  - Runners-up: 1951
- Under 15 Bayernliga
  - Runners-up: 2014

^{‡} Marks championships won by SpVgg Hof, all others by Bayern Hof.

== Recent managers ==
Recent managers of the club:

Manager	Start	Finish
Henrik Schödel	1 July 2005	27 October 2006
Armin Eck	30 October 2006	14 September 2007
Andy Singer	18 September 2007	10 March 2008
Michael Voigt	1 July 2007	12 November 2009
Thomas Kost	17 November 2009	30 June 2010
Daniel Felgenhauer	1 July 2010	24 September 2010
Norbert Schlegel	24 September 2010	26 May 2013
Daniel Felgenhauer Henrik Schödel	26 May 2013	31 March 2014
Michael Voigt	1 April 2014	30 June 2014
Faruk Maloku	1 July 2014	30 June 2015
Miloslav Janovský	1 July 2015	6 August 2017
Alexander Spindler	9 August 2017	21 July 2019
Fulvio Bifano	22 July 2019	30 June 2020
Roman Přibyl	1 July 2020	31 May 2022
Perparim Gashi	1 July 2022	16 August 2022
Mikheil Sajaia	16 August 2022	4 November 2024
Henrik Schödel	9 November 2024	

== Recent seasons ==
The recent season-by-season performance of the club:

=== SpVgg Bayern Hof ===
Season	Division	Tier	Position
1999–2000	Bayernliga	IV	4th
2000–01	Bayernliga	IV	14th
2001–02	Bayernliga	IV	4th
2002–03	Bayernliga	IV	12th
2003–04	Bayernliga	IV	17th ↓
2004–05	Landesliga Bayern-Nord	V	2nd
2005–06	Landesliga Bayern-Nord	V	1st ↑
2006–07	Bayernliga	IV	12th
2007–08	Bayernliga	IV	15th
2008–09	Bayernliga	V	10th
2009–10	Bayernliga	V	10th
2010–11	Bayernliga	V	15th
2011–12	Bayernliga	V	2nd ↑
2012–13	Regionalliga Bayern	IV	17th
2013–14	Regionalliga Bayern	IV	17th ↓
2014–15	Bayernliga Nord	V	8th
2015–16	Bayernliga Nord	V	3rd ↑
2016–17	Regionalliga Bayern	IV	17th ↓
2017–18	Bayernliga Nord	V	10th
2018–19	Bayernliga Nord	V	7th
2019–21	Bayernliga Nord	V	13th
2021–22	Bayernliga Nord	V	12th
2022–23	Bayernliga Nord	V	15th
2023–24	Bayernliga Nord	V	6th
2024–25	Bayernliga Nord	V	11th
2025–26	Bayernliga Nord	V	10th

=== SpVgg Bayern Hof II ===
Season	Division	Tier	Position
1999–2000	Bezirksliga Oberfranken-Ost	VII	7th
2000–01	Bezirksliga Oberfranken-Ost	VII	4th
2001–02	Bezirksliga Oberfranken-Ost	VII	1st ↑
2002–03	Bezirksoberliga Oberfranken	VI	3rd ↑
2003–04	Landesliga Bayern-Nord	V	15th ↓
2004–05	Bezirksoberliga Oberfranken	VI	12th
2005–06	Bezirksoberliga Oberfranken	VI	12th
2006–07	Bezirksoberliga Oberfranken	VI	15th ↓
2007–08	Bezirksliga Oberfranken-Ost	VII	3rd
2008–09	Bezirksliga Oberfranken-Ost	VIII	3rd
2009–10	Bezirksliga Oberfranken-Ost	VIII	9th
2010–11	Bezirksliga Oberfranken-Ost	VIII	16th ↓
2011–12	Kreisliga Hof/Marktredwitz	IX	16th ↓
competes as joint team 2015–17 and since 2024–25

- With the introduction of the Bezirksoberligas in 1988 as the new fifth tier, below the Landesligas, all leagues below dropped one tier. With the introduction of the Regionalligas in 1994 and the 3. Liga in 2008 as the new third tier, below the 2. Bundesliga, all leagues below dropped one tier. With the establishment of the Regionalliga Bayern as the new fourth tier in Bavaria in 2012 the Bayernliga was split into a northern and a southern division, the number of Landesligas expanded from three to five and the Bezirksoberligas abolished. All leagues from the Bezirksligas onwards were elevated one tier.

↑ Promoted	↓ Relegated

== DFB Cup appearances ==
The club has qualified for the first round of the German Cup a number of times:

Season	Round	Date	Home	Away	Result	Attendance
1962–63 DFB-Pokal	First round	1 June 1963	FC Bayern Hof	Hamburger SV	2–5	
1967–68 DFB-Pokal	First round	27 January 1968	FC Bayern Hof	Borussia M'gladbach	0–1	
1974–75 DFB-Pokal	First round	7 September 1974	Karlsruher SC	FC Bayern Hof	0–1	
1974–75 DFB-Pokal	Second round	25 October 1974	FC Bayern Hof	VfL Bochum	2–2 aet	
1974–75 DFB-Pokal	Second round replay	21 December 1974	VfL Bochum	FC Bayern Hof	5–0	
1975–76 DFB-Pokal	First round	1 August 1975	VfR Bürstadt	FC Bayern Hof	1–2	
1975–76 DFB-Pokal	Second round	18 October 1975	1. FC Mülheim	FC Bayern Hof	1–3 aet	
1975–76 DFB-Pokal	Third round	13 December 1975	SG Wattenscheid 09	FC Bayern Hof	2–3	
1975–76 DFB-Pokal	Fourth round	31 January 1976	FC Bayern Hof	Hamburger SV	0–2	
1976–77 DFB-Pokal	First round	6 August 1976	FC Bayern Hof	VfB Oldenburg	3–2	
1976–77 DFB-Pokal	Second round	16 October 1976	Hertha BSC Berlin	FC Bayern Hof	3–1	
1977–78 DFB-Pokal	First round	29 July 1977	Concordia Hamburg	FC Bayern Hof	2–0	
1978–79 DFB-Pokal	First round	5 August 1978	FC St. Pauli	FC Bayern Hof	3–0 aet	
1981–82 DFB-Pokal	First round	28 August 1981	FC Bayern Hof	Waldhof Mannheim	0–2	
1982–83 DFB-Pokal	First round	27 August 1982	FC Bayern Hof	Arminia Bielefeld	0–5	

Source:"DFB-Pokal" (in German). Weltfussball.de.
