= Yannick Brugger =

German footballer (born 2001)

Personal information
- Date of birth: 27 January 2001 (age 25)
- Place of birth: Schwabmünchen, Germany
- Height: 1.90 m (6 ft 3 in)
- Position: Centre-back

Youth career
- 1860 Munich
- 2016–2018: Bayern Munich
- 2018–2020: Eintracht Frankfurt

Senior career*
Years	Team	Apps	(Gls)
2020–2021	Eintracht Frankfurt	0	(0)
2021–2022	Admira Wacker II	3	(0)
2021–2022	Admira Wacker	12	(0)
2024	TSG Balingen	2	(0)
- * Club domestic league appearances and goals as of 17:42, 4 July 2024 (UTC)

Yannick Brugger (born 27 January 2001) is a German professional footballer who most recently played as a centre-back for TSG Balingen.

== Career ==
Brugger is a youth product of the academies of 1860 Munich, Bayern Munich and Eintracht Frankfurt. He was promoted to Eintracht Frankfurt's senior team for the 2020–21 season where he made one bench appearance, before leaving when his contract expired on 30 June 2021. He transferred to the Austrian club Admira Wacker on 5 July 2021. He made his professional debut with Admira Wacker in a 3–0 Austrian Football Bundesliga loss to Wolfsberger AC on 21 August 2021.
