= Serkan Atak =

Turkish footballer (born 1984)

Personal information
- Date of birth: 3 January 1984 (age 42)
- Place of birth: Kösching, Germany
- Height: 1.75 m (5 ft 9 in)
- Positions: Attacking midfielder; winger

Team information
- Current team: Ankaragücü (assistant)

Youth career
- –1997: FC Ingolstadt 04
- 1997–2003: Bayern Munich

Senior career*
Years	Team	Apps	(Gls)
2003–2005	Bayern Munich (A)	25	(1)
2005	Gaziantepspor	5	(0)
2006	→ G. Büyükşehir (loan)	12	(2)
2006–2010	Hacettepespor	125	(19)
2010–2011	Çaykur Rizespor	18	(1)
2011–2014	Kayseri Erciyesspor	65	(5)
2014	Osmanlıspor	11	(2)
2014–2015	Antalyaspor	9	(0)
2015–2016	Denizlispor	34	(0)
2017	Bugsas Spor	2	(0)
Total		306	(30)

International career
2001	Turkey U17	3	(0)
2002	Turkey U19	6	(0)
2004	Turkey U21	5	(0)
2005	Turkey U23	5	(0)

Managerial career
- 2019–2024: Gençlerbirliği (assistant)
- 2025–: Ankaragücü (assistant)
- * Club domestic league appearances and goals

Serkan Atak (born 3 January 1984) is a Turkish football coach and former professional footballer who is currently the assistant coach for Ankaragücü. Raised in the youth ranks of Bayern Munich, he represented Turkish national teams in various youth levels.
