= Paul Thomik =

German footballer

Personal information
- Date of birth: 25 January 1985 (age 41)
- Place of birth: Zabrze, Poland
- Height: 1.78 m (5 ft 10 in)
- Position: Midfielder

Youth career
- FC Sürenheide
- Westfalia Wiedenbrück
- FC Gütersloh
- Bayern Munich

Senior career*
Years	Team	Apps	(Gls)
2004–2005	Bayern Munich II	28	(3)
2005–2007	SpVgg Unterhaching	40	(3)
2007–2009	VfL Osnabrück	53	(4)
2010–2011	Union Berlin	25	(1)
2011–2013	Górnik Zabrze	8	(0)
2012–2013	→ VfL Osnabrück (loan)	14	(1)
2013–2015	VfL Osnabrück	10	(1)
2015–2016	Würzburger Kickers	10	(0)
2017–2020	SV Heimstetten	35	(0)

International career
	Germany U-20	11	(0)
- * Club domestic league appearances and goals

Paul Thomik (born 25 January 1985) is a German former professional footballer who played as a midfielder.

== Career ==
Thomik was born in Zabrze.

In July 2011, he joined Górnik Zabrze on a three-year contract.
