= Barbaros Barut =

Turkish-German football midfielder

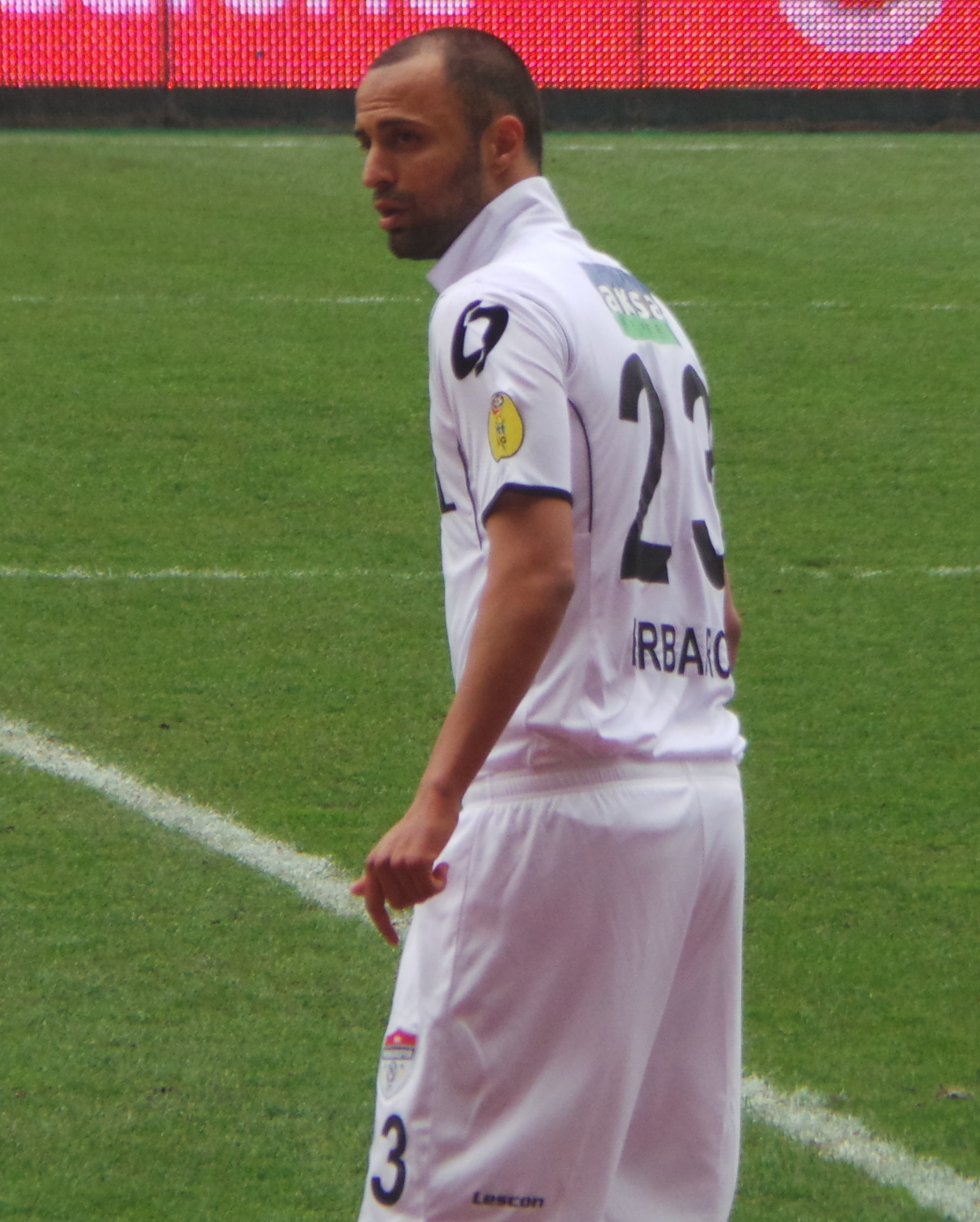
- Barbaros Barut in 2014

Personal information
- Full name: Barbaros Bahadır Barut
- Date of birth: 26 January 1983 (age 43)
- Place of birth: Munich, West Germany
- Height: 1.83 m (6 ft 0 in)
- Position: Midfielder

Team information
- Current team: Manisaspor
- Number: 23

Youth career
- 1989–1991: Phönix München
- 1991–2001: FC Bayern Munich

Senior career*
Years	Team	Apps	(Gls)
2001–2003	FC Bayern Munich II	49	(5)
2003–2005	SpVgg Unterhaching	44	(4)
2005–2007	SpVgg Greuther Fürth	24	(3)
2007	Rot-Weiss Essen	12	(1)
2007–2008	Kasımpaşa S.K.	20	(1)
2008–2010	Ankaragücü	38	(3)
2011	Konyaspor	5	(0)
2012	Adanaspor	18	(3)
2012–2013	Boluspor	21	(0)
2013–2016	Manisaspor	43	(0)
2016–	Manisa BBSK	17	(0)
- * Club domestic league appearances and goals as of 13 October 2018 ‡ National team caps and goals as of 14 October 2018

Barbaros Barut (born 26 January 1983 in Munich) is a Turkish-German football midfielder who currently plays for Manisaspor.
