= Erdal Kılıçaslan =

Turkish-German footballer

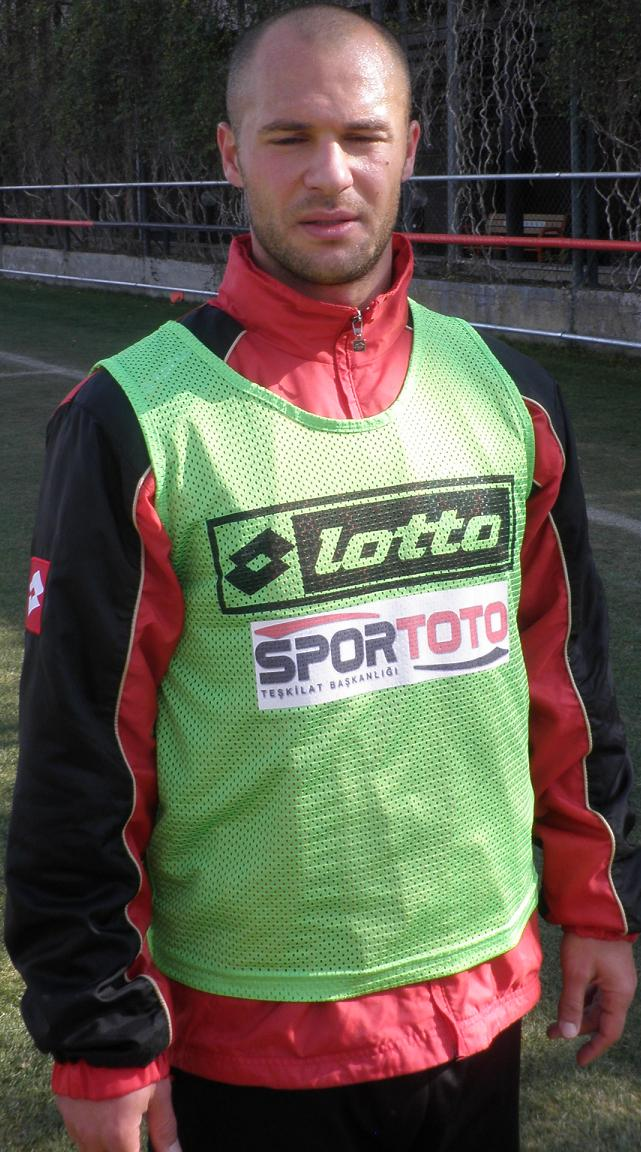

Personal information
- Date of birth: 23 August 1984 (age 42)
- Place of birth: Munich, West Germany
- Height: 1.73 m (5 ft 8 in)
- Position: Forward

Youth career
- 1998–2000: TSV Waldtrudering
- 2000–2002: Bayern Munich

Senior career*
Years	Team	Apps	(Gls)
2002–2005	Bayern Munich (A)	66	(9)
2005–2008	Gaziantepspor	35	(3)
2006–2007	→ Gaziantep B.B. (loan)	16	(9)
2008–2011	Konyaspor	36	(8)
2011–2012	Gençlerbirliği	12	(1)
2012	Mersin İdmanyurdu	8	(2)
2012–2014	Konyaspor	56	(13)
2014–2017	Osmanlispor	62	(8)

International career
2002–2003	Germany U19	10	(10)
2003	Germany U20	2	(0)
- * Club domestic league appearances and goals

Erdal Kılıçaslan (born 23 August 1984) is a Turkish-German former professional footballer who played as a forward. With 41 goals in 64 caps across all Germany youth levels, he holds the record for German youth internationals.

== Career ==
Kılıçaslan came through youth setup at Bayern Munich. During this time he represented Germany at Under-15 to Under-20 level, scoring 41 goals in 64 caps overall. As of December 2017, this was a record for any German youth international. He progressed to Bayern's reserve team in the Regionalliga, but left after two years, heading to Turkey in 2005. After three years with Gaziantepspor, he moved to Konyaspor in 2008 and joined Gençlerbirliği in 2011.

Kılıçaslan was released by Osmanlispor in summer 2017.
