= 2026–27 FC Bayern Munich season =

128th season in existence of FC Bayern Munich

Bayern Munich
2026–27 season
- President: Herbert Hainer
- Head coach: Vincent Kompany
- Stadium: Allianz Arena
- Bundesliga: 1st
- DFB-Pokal: Round of 16
- Franz Beckenbauer Supercup: Winners
- UEFA Champions League: League phase
- Top goalscorer: League: Michael Olise (6); All: Michael Olise (12)
- Biggest win: Bayern Munich 7–0 Union Berlin; 18 September 2026, Bundesliga
Home colours	Away colours	Third colours

The 2026–27 season is the 128th season in the history of Bayern Munich, and the club's 62nd consecutive season in the top flight of German football. In addition to the domestic league, the club is participating in this season's editions of the DFB-Pokal, the Franz Beckenbauer Supercup, and the UEFA Champions League.

This is the first season since 2017–18 without Leon Goretzka, and the first season since 2023–24 without Raphaël Guerreiro, who both departed from the club when their contracts expired, on 30 June 2026.

== Players ==
As of 20 November 2026

Note: Flags indicate national team as defined under FIFA eligibility rules; some limited exceptions apply. Players may hold more than one non-FIFA nationality.

No.	Pos.	Nation	Player
1	GK	GER	Manuel Neuer (captain)
2	DF	FRA	Dayot Upamecano
3	DF	KOR	Kim Min-jae
4	DF	GER	Jonathan Tah
6	MF	GER	Joshua Kimmich (vice-captain)
7	FW	GER	Serge Gnabry
8	MF	GER	Tom Bischof
9	FW	ENG	Harry Kane (3rd captain)
10	MF	GER	Jamal Musiala
11	DF	GER	Nathaniel Brown
14	FW	COL	Luis Díaz
17	FW	FRA	Michael Olise
19	DF	CAN	Alphonso Davies
21	DF	JPN	Hiroki Itō
23	DF	FRA	Sacha Boey
26	GK	GER	Sven Ulreich
27	MF	AUT	Konrad Laimer
30	DF	GER	Cassiano Kiala
34	MF	MAR	Ismael Saibari

No.	Pos.	Nation	Player
35	GK	GER	Jannis Bärtl
36	FW	FRA	Noah Codjo-Evora
38	GK	GER	David Podar-Știube
39	MF	SEN	Bara Sapoko Ndiaye
40	GK	GER	Jonas Urbig
42	MF	GER	Lennart Karl
43	DF	CRO	Filip Pavić
44	DF	CRO	Josip Stanišić
45	MF	GER	Aleksandar Pavlović
46	FW	GER	Tim Binder
47	MF	POR	David Santos Daiber
48	FW	GER	Bastian Assomo
49	FW	BRA	Maycon Cardozo
—	GK	GER	Leon Klanac
—	GK	GER	Leonard Prescott
—	DF	GER	Tarek Buchmann
—	DF	GER	Vincent Manuba
—	MF	ITA	Guido Della Rovere
—	MF	KOS	Erblin Osmani

== Transfers ==
=== In ===
Date	Pos.	Player	From	Type	Fee	Ref.
30 March 2026 (Note: Transfer became effective on 1 July 2026, at the start of the 2026–27 season.)	MF	(Austria) Matteo Marić	(Austria) Red Bull Salzburg	Transfer	Undisclosed	
30 June 2026	DF	(France) Sacha Boey	(Turkey) Galatasaray	Loan return	—N/a	
30 June 2026	MF	(Portugal) João Palhinha	(England) Tottenham Hotspur	Loan return	—N/a	
30 June 2026	FW	(Spain) Bryan Zaragoza	(Italy) Roma	Loan return	—N/a	
30 June 2026	MF	(Germany) Arijon Ibrahimović	(Germany) 1. FC Heidenheim	Loan return	—N/a	
30 June 2026	MF	(Peru) Felipe Chávez	(Germany) 1. FC Köln	Loan return	—N/a	
30 June 2026	MF	(Croatia) Lovro Zvonarek	(Switzerland) Grasshoppers	Loan return	—N/a	
30 June 2026	MF	(Denmark) Jonathan Asp Jensen	(Switzerland) Grasshoppers	Loan return	—N/a	
30 June 2026	GK	(Germany) Alexander Nübel	(Germany) VfB Stuttgart	Loan return	—N/a	
30 June 2026	DF	(Germany) Tarek Buchmann	(Germany) 1. FC Nürnberg	Loan return	—N/a	
30 June 2026	FW	(Germany) Armindo Sieb	(Germany) Mainz 05	Loan return	—N/a	
30 June 2026	MF	(Germany) Noël Aséko Nkili	(Germany) Hannover 96	Loan return	—N/a	
30 June 2026	DF	(Germany) Benedikt Wimmer	(Germany) SV Sandhausen	Loan return	—N/a	
30 June 2026	FW	(Germany) Richard Meier	(Germany) SpVgg Unterhaching	Loan return	—N/a	
30 June 2026	FW	(Germany) Gibson Adu	(Germany) SpVgg Unterhaching	Loan return	—N/a	
30 June 2026	FW	(Germany) Jason Eckl	(Germany) SpVgg Unterhaching	Loan return	—N/a	
30 June 2026	DF	(Germany) Maximilian Hennig	(Austria) TSV Hartberg	Loan return	—N/a	
1 July 2026	MF	(Morocco) Ismael Saibari	(Netherlands) PSV Eindhoven	Transfer	Undisclosed	
3 July 2026	DF	(Germany) Nathaniel Brown	(Germany) Eintracht Frankfurt	Transfer	€55,000,000	
23 July 2026	MF	(Czech Republic) Matouš Srb	(Czech Republic) Slavia Prague	Transfer	Undisclosed	
10 August 2026	MF	(Senegal) Bara Sapoko Ndiaye	(The Gambia) Gambinos Stars	Transfer	Undisclosed	

Total spending: ▼€55,000,000

=== Out ===
Date	Pos.	Player	To	Type	Fee	Ref.
19 April 2026 (Note: Transfer became effective on 1 July 2026, at the start of the 2026–27 season.)	FW	(Germany) Sadiki Chemwor	(Germany) Eintracht Frankfurt	End of contract		
19 May 2026	DF	(Germany) Paul Scholl	(Germany) Karlsruher SC	Transfer	€150,000	
24 May 2026	MF	(Iraq) Jussef Nasrawe	(Austria) SV Ried	Transfer	€100,000	
28 May 2026	DF	(United States) Grayson Dettoni	(Germany) Darmstadt 98	Transfer	€250,000	
5 June 2026	GK	(Israel) Daniel Peretz	(England) Southampton	Transfer	€8,000,000	
12 June 2026	MF	(Germany) Maurice Krattenmacher	(Germany) SV Elversberg	Transfer	€2,000,000	
13 June 2026	MF	(Spain) Javi Fernández	(Germany) 1. FC Nürnberg	Loan	Undisclosed	
15 June 2026	DF	(Croatia) Ljubo Puljić	(Italy) Atalanta	Transfer	€2,800,000	
18 June 2026	DF	(United States) Robert Deziel Jr.	(Poland) Legia Warsaw	End of contract		
23 June 2026	GK	(Germany) Max Schmitt	(Germany) Jahn Regensburg	Transfer	Undisclosed	
24 June 2026	DF	(Austria) Magnus Dalpiaz	(Austria) TSV Hartberg	Loan	Undisclosed	
27 June 2026	FW	(Sweden) Jonah Kusi-Asare	(England) Fulham	Transfer	€6,000,000	
30 June 2026	MF	(Germany) Leon Goretzka	(England) Aston Villa	End of contract		
30 June 2026	DF	(Portugal) Raphaël Guerreiro	Unattached	End of contract		
30 June 2026	MF	(Germany) Kurt Rüger	Unattached	End of contract		
30 June 2026	DF	(Germany) Steve Breitkreuz	Unattached	End of contract		
30 June 2026	DF	(Germany) Maximilian Schuhbauer	(Germany) SV Wacker Burghausen	End of contract		
30 June 2026	FW	(Germany) Simon Zöls	(Germany) VfL Sportfreunde Lotte	End of contract		
30 June 2026	DF	(Germany) Allan Bohomo	(Italy) Hellas Verona	End of contract		
30 June 2026	FW	(Senegal) Nicolas Jackson	(England) Chelsea	Loan return		
30 June 2026	MF	(Senegal) Bara Sapoko Ndiaye	(The Gambia) Gambinos Stars	Loan return		
4 July 2026	DF	(Turkey) Deniz Ofli	(Germany) Karlsruher SC	Loan	Undisclosed	
7 July 2026	GK	(Germany) Alexander Nübel	(Turkey) Beşiktaş	Transfer	Undisclosed	
9 July 2026	FW	(Germany) Richard Meier	(Germany) SV Meppen	Loan	Undisclosed	
13 July 2026	MF	(Denmark) Jonathan Asp Jensen	(Spain) Deportivo A Coruña	Transfer	Undisclosed	
16 July 2026	MF	(Croatia) Lovro Zvonarek	(Portugal) Estrela da Amadora	Transfer	Undisclosed	
17 July 2026	DF	(Germany) Julien Yanda	(Spain) Eldense	Loan	Undisclosed	
18 July 2026	MF	(Germany) Noël Aséko Nkili	(Germany) Eintracht Frankfurt	Transfer	Undisclosed	
13 August 2026	FW	(Germany) Armindo Sieb	(United States) Los Angeles FC	Transfer	Undisclosed	
26 August 2026	MF	(Portugal) João Palhinha	(Portugal) Benfica	Transfer	€14,000,000	
26 August 2026	MF	(Peru) Felipe Chávez	(Germany) 1. FC Magdeburg	Loan	Undisclosed	
27 August 2026	FW	(Spain) Bryan Zaragoza	(Spain) Espanyol	Loan	Undisclosed	
27 August 2026	FW	(Germany) Wisdom Mike	(Belgium) Club Brugge	Transfer	Undisclosed	
31 August 2026	GK	(Germany) Hannes Heilmair	Unattached	Contract termination		
1 September 2026	MF	(Germany) Arijon Ibrahimović	(Germany) FC Augsburg	Loan	Undisclosed	
1 September 2026	FW	(Germany) Gibson Adu	(Germany) Greifswalder FC	Transfer	Undisclosed	
1 September 2026	DF	(Germany) Luis Schäfer	(Germany) SpVgg Unterhaching	Transfer	Undisclosed	

Total income: ▲€33,300,000
Balance: ▼€21,700,000

== Pre-season and friendlies ==
Win Draw Loss Fixtures

25 July 2026 Friendly	Wehen Wiesbaden	2–1	Bayern Munich	Wiesbaden
15:30 CEST	Ati Allah 10'; Schleimer 83'	Report	Ajayi (yellow card) 19'; Bischof 57' (pen.)	Stadium: Brita-Arena; Attendance: 12,000; Referee: Christian Ballweg

30 July 2026 Friendly	FC Rottach-Egern	0–15	Bayern Munich	Rottach-Egern
18:00 CEST		Report	Pavić 8'; Ibrahimović 9', 45+2'; Chávez 10', 13'; Cardozo 45+3', 50'; Sieb 51', 59'; Palhinha 56'; Ndiaye 67'; Assomo 67'; Pavlović 86'; Kimmich 88'; Nuraj 90+3'	Stadium: Stadion am Birkenmoos; Attendance: 2,926; Referee: Assad Nouhoum

4 August 2026 Friendly	Jeju SK	1–2	Bayern Munich	Seogwipo, South Korea
20:00 KST; 13:00 CEST	Lee 15'	Report	Chávez 11'; Assomo 41'	Stadium: Jeju World Cup Stadium; Attendance: 22,519; Referee: Shin Yong-jun

7 August 2026 Friendly	Bayern Munich	2–1	Aston Villa	Kowloon, Hong Kong
20:00 HKT; 14:00 CEST	Cardozo (yellow card) 26'; Kim 37'; Díaz 73'; Boey (yellow card) 78'	Report	João Gomes 83'	Stadium: Kai Tak Sports Park; Attendance: 38,176; Referee: Poon Chun Kit

15 August 2026 Telekom Cup	Bayern Munich	3–1	RB Leipzig	Munich
15:30 CEST	Díaz 13'; Brown 58'; Musiala 81'	Report	Gruda 53'	Stadium: Allianz Arena; Attendance: 75,000; Referee: Robert Hartmann

18 August 2026 Friendly	1. FC Heidenheim	2–4	Bayern Munich	Heidenheim
18:00 CEST	Wagner 5'; Kerber (yellow card) 21'; Niehues 44'	Report	Chávez 25'; Binder (yellow card) 43'; Ibrahimović 47' (pen.); Díaz 78'; Olise (yellow card) 81'; Brown 83'	Stadium: Voith-Arena; Attendance: 11,727; Referee: Martin Petersen

5 January 2027 Friendly	Bayern Munich	v	Ajax	Nairobi, Kenya
				Stadium: Nyayo National Stadium

== Competitions ==
=== Overall record ===
Competition	First match	Last match	Starting round	Final position	Record							
Competition	First match	Last match	Starting round	Final position	Pld	W	D	L	GF	GA	GD	Win %
Bundesliga	28 August 2026	22 May 2027	Matchday 1	TBD	10	6	4	0	30	10	+20	60.00
DFB-Pokal	2 September 2026	TBD	First round	TBD	2	2	0	0	10	2	+8	100.00
Franz Beckenbauer Supercup	22 August 2026		Final	Winners	1	1	0	0	2	1	+1	100.00
UEFA Champions League	10 September 2026	TBD	League phase	TBD	4	2	2	0	12	5	+7	50.00
Total					17	11	6	0	54	18	+36	64.71

Last updated: 20 November 2026
Source: Soccerway

=== Bundesliga ===
==== League table ====
Pos	Team	Pld	W	D	L	GF	GA	GD	Pts	Qualification or relegation
1	Bayern Munich	10	6	4	0	30	10	+20	22	Qualification for the Champions League league phase
2	Borussia Dortmund	9	6	3	0	16	7	+9	21	Qualification for the Champions League league phase
3	SC Freiburg	9	6	1	2	20	10	+10	19	Qualification for the Champions League league phase
4	RB Leipzig	9	6	0	3	27	13	+14	18	Qualification for the Champions League league phase
5	Bayer Leverkusen	9	5	1	3	20	17	+3	16	Qualification for the Europa League league phase (Note: The 2026–27 DFB-Pokal winners also qualify for the Europa League league stage (or the sixth-placed team if the DFB-Pokal winners finish in the top five of the Bundesliga). If the DFB-Pokal winners finish in the top six of the Bundesliga, the Conference League spot will be passed to the seventh-placed team.)

Updated to match(es) played on 20 November 2026. Source: Bundesliga
Rules for classification: 1) Points; 2) Goal difference; 3) Goals scored; 4) Head-to-head aggregate results; 5) Head-to-head away goals scored; 6) Away goals scored; 7) Play-off at neutral site.
(Rules 4–6 only apply after all home-and-away matches have been played between the tied teams. Rule 7 only applies after the completion of the season.)

==== Results summary ====
Overall								Home						Away					
Pld	W	D	L	GF	GA	GD	Pts	W	D	L	GF	GA	GD	W	D	L	GF	GA	GD
10	6	4	0	30	10	+20	22	3	2	0	21	5	+16	3	2	0	9	5	+4

Last updated: 20 November 2026.
Source: kicker.de

==== Results by round ====
Round	1	2	3	4	5	6	7	8	9	10	11	12	13	14	15	16	17	18	19	20	21	22	23	24	25	26	27	28	29	30	31	32	33	34
Ground	H	A	A	H	A	H	A	H	A	H	A	H	A	H	A	H	A	A	H	H	A	H	A	H	A	H	A	H	A	H	A	H	A	H
Result	W	D	W	W	D	W	W	D	W	D																								
Position	1	6	4	2	3	1	1	1	1																									
Points	3	4	7	10	11	14	17	18	21	22																								

Updated to match(es) played on 20 November 2026. Source: Bundesliga
A = Away; H = Home; W = Win; D = Draw; L = Loss

==== Matches ====
The Bundesliga fixtures were released on 2 July 2026.

Win Draw Loss Fixtures

28 August 2026 1	Bayern Munich	5–1	VfB Stuttgart	Munich
20:30 CEST	Upamecano 21'; Olise 55'; Vagnoman 58' (o.g.); Kim (yellow card) 81'; Pavlović 82'; Díaz 90+2'	Report	Vagnoman 52'; Chabot (yellow card) 62'; Jeltsch (yellow card) 68'; Prömel (yellow card) 90+2'	Stadium: Allianz Arena; Attendance: 75,000; Referee: Sören Storks

5 September 2026 2	Schalke 04	0–0	Bayern Munich	Gelsenkirchen
18:30 CEST	Dina Ebimbe (yellow card) 31'; Katić (yellow card) 73'	Report	Upamecano (yellow card) 35'; Pavlović (yellow card) 72'	Stadium: Veltins-Arena; Attendance: 62,094; Referee: Robert Schröder

13 September 2026 3	SV Elversberg	1–2	Bayern Munich	Spiesen-Elversberg
17:30 CEST	Onyeka (yellow card) 7'; Krattenmacher 61'; Keidel (yellow card) 63'	Report	Karl 26'; Kane 72'	Stadium: Ursapharm-Arena; Attendance: 9,307; Referee: Sascha Stegemann

18 September 2026 4	Bayern Munich	7–0	Union Berlin	Munich
20:30 CEST	Musiala 18'; Kane 39' (pen.), 54'; Olise 43', 73', 76'; Upamecano (yellow card) 45+2'; Saibari 70'	Report	Uduokhai (yellow card) 38'; Khedira (yellow card) 42'; Burcu (yellow card) 78'	Stadium: Allianz Arena; Attendance: 75,000; Referee: Benjamin Brand

10 October 2026 5	FC Augsburg	2–2	Bayern Munich	Augsburg
15:30 CEST	Fellhauer 1'; Matsima (yellow card) 42'; Ribeiro (yellow card) 43', (goal) 64'; Behrens (yellow card) 62'	Report	Saibari 55'; Brown 80'	Stadium: WWK Arena; Attendance: 30,660; Referee: Sven Jablonski

17 October 2026 6	Bayern Munich	6–1	RB Leipzig	Munich
18:30 CEST	Díaz 12', 47', 69'; Pavlović 26'; Olise 34'; Laimer (yellow card) 51'; Kane 53'	Report	Maksimović 90+1'	Stadium: Allianz Arena; Attendance: 75,000; Referee: Tobias Stieler

25 October 2026 7	SC Freiburg	1–3	Bayern Munich	Freiburg
17:30 CET	Höler (yellow card) 25'; Beste (yellow card) 55'; Bischof 82' (o.g.); Eggestein (yellow card) 85'	Report	Upamecano 16'; Gnabry 42'; Tah (yellow card) 65'; Olise 90+5'	Stadium: Europa-Park Stadion; Attendance: 34,700; Referee: Felix Zwayer

31 October 2026 8	Bayern Munich	2–2	Borussia Dortmund	Munich
18:30 CET	Laimer 38', (yellow card) 74'; Stanišić (yellow card) 53'; Upamecano 66'	Report	Bellingham (yellow card) 6'; Guirassy 60'; Silva 89'	Stadium: Allianz Arena; Attendance: 75,000; Referee: Tobias Stieler

7 November 2026 9	Mainz 05	1–2	Bayern Munich	Mainz
15:30 CET	Tietz 90+3'	Report	Kimmich 14'; Karl 57'; Laimer (yellow card) 76'	Stadium: Mewa Arena; Attendance: 34,000; Referee: Robert Schröder

20 November 2026 10	Bayern Munich	1–1	1. FC Köln	Munich
20:30 CET	Brown 37'; Upamecano (yellow card) 62'	Report	Moore 12'; Okon-Engstler (yellow card) 56'; El Mala (yellow card) 66'	Stadium: Allianz Arena; Attendance: 75,000; Referee: Robin Braun

28 November 2026 11	Hamburger SV	v	Bayern Munich	Hamburg
15:30 CET		Report		Stadium: Volksparkstadion

4 December 2026 12	Bayern Munich	v	SC Paderborn	Munich
20:30 CET		Report		Stadium: Allianz Arena

13 December 2026 13	TSG Hoffenheim	v	Bayern Munich	Sinsheim
17:30 CET		Report		Stadium: SNP Arena

18 December 2026 14	Bayern Munich	v	Werder Bremen	Munich
20:30 CET		Report		Stadium: Allianz Arena

9 January 2027 15	Borussia Mönchengladbach	v	Bayern Munich	Mönchengladbach
18:30 CET		Report		Stadium: Borussia-Park

13 January 2027 16	Bayern Munich	v	Bayer Leverkusen	Munich
20:30 CET		Report		Stadium: Allianz Arena

16 January 2027 17	Eintracht Frankfurt	v	Bayern Munich	Frankfurt
18:30 CET		Report		Stadium: Deutsche Bank Park

23 January 2027 18	VfB Stuttgart	v	Bayern Munich	Stuttgart
15:30 CET		Report		Stadium: MHPArena

29–31 January 2027 19	Bayern Munich	v	Schalke 04	Munich
--:-- CET		Report		Stadium: Allianz Arena

5–7 February 2027 20	Bayern Munich	v	SV Elversberg	Munich
--:-- CET		Report		Stadium: Allianz Arena

12–14 February 2027 21	Union Berlin	v	Bayern Munich	Berlin
--:-- CET		Report		Stadium: Stadion An der Alten Försterei

19–21 February 2027 22	Bayern Munich	v	FC Augsburg	Munich
--:-- CET		Report		Stadium: Allianz Arena

26–28 February 2027 23	RB Leipzig	v	Bayern Munich	Leipzig
--:-- CET		Report		Stadium: Red Bull Arena

2–4 March 2027 24	Bayern Munich	v	SC Freiburg	Munich
--:-- CET		Report		Stadium: Allianz Arena

5–7 March 2027 25	Borussia Dortmund	v	Bayern Munich	Dortmund
--:-- CET		Report		Stadium: Signal Iduna Park

12–14 March 2027 26	Bayern Munich	v	Mainz 05	Munich
--:-- CET		Report		Stadium: Allianz Arena

19–21 March 2027 27	1. FC Köln	v	Bayern Munich	Cologne
--:-- CET		Report		Stadium: RheinEnergieStadion

2–4 April 2027 28	Bayern Munich	v	Hamburger SV	Munich
--:-- CEST		Report		Stadium: Allianz Arena

9–11 April 2027 29	SC Paderborn	v	Bayern Munich	Paderborn
--:-- CEST		Report		Stadium: Home Deluxe Arena

16–18 April 2027 30	Bayern Munich	v	TSG Hoffenheim	Munich
--:-- CEST		Report		Stadium: Allianz Arena

23–25 April 2027 31	Werder Bremen	v	Bayern Munich	Bremen
--:-- CEST		Report		Stadium: Weserstadion

7–9 May 2027 32	Bayern Munich	v	Borussia Mönchengladbach	Munich
--:-- CEST		Report		Stadium: Allianz Arena

14–16 May 2027 33	Bayer Leverkusen	v	Bayern Munich	Leverkusen
--:-- CEST		Report		Stadium: BayArena

22 May 2027 34	Bayern Munich	v	Eintracht Frankfurt	Munich
15:30 CEST		Report		Stadium: Allianz Arena

=== DFB-Pokal ===
The first round draw was held on 6 June 2026.

2 September 2026 First round	VfL Osnabrück	1–4	Bayern Munich	Osnabrück
20:45 CEST	Meißner 5'	Report	Kane 18', 86' (pen.); Bischof 24'; Olise 73'	Stadium: Stadion an der Bremer Brücke; Attendance: 15,741; Referee: Richard Hempel

28 October 2026 Second round	Bayern Munich	6–1	1. FC Magdeburg	Munich
20:45 CET	Olise 10', 50' (pen.); Saibari 21'; Davies 70'; Brown 73', (yellow card) 84'; Pavlović (yellow card) 89'; Daiber 90+3'	Report	Żukowski 15'; Michel (yellow card) 81'; García MacNulty (yellow card) 87'; Nadjombe (yellow card) 90+1'	Stadium: Allianz Arena; Attendance: 75,000; Referee: Harm Osmers

1 December 2026 Round of 16	Bayern Munich	v	Hertha BSC	Munich
20:45 CET		Report		Stadium: Allianz Arena

=== Franz Beckenbauer Supercup ===
22 August 2026 Final	Borussia Dortmund	1–2	Bayern Munich	Dortmund
20:30 CEST	Silva 75'; Bensebaini (red card) 90'	Report	Brown 28'; Díaz (yellow card) 45+1'; Olise 45+1'	Stadium: Signal Iduna Park; Attendance: 81,365; Referee: Daniel Schlager

=== UEFA Champions League ===
==== League phase ====
The league phase draw was held on 27 August 2026.

Pos	Team	Pld	W	D	L	GF	GA	GD	Pts	Qualification
11	(Spain) Real Betis	4	3	0	1	8	6	+2	9	Advance to knockout phase play-offs (seeded)
12	(Germany) Borussia Dortmund	4	3	0	1	7	5	+2	9	Advance to knockout phase play-offs (seeded)
13	(Germany) Bayern Munich	4	2	2	0	12	5	+7	8	Advance to knockout phase play-offs (seeded)
14	(Germany) VfB Stuttgart	4	2	1	1	7	4	+3	7	Advance to knockout phase play-offs (seeded)
15	(Italy) Inter Milan	4	2	0	2	8	6	+2	6	Advance to knockout phase play-offs (seeded)

Updated to match(es) played on 4 November 2026. Source: UEFA
Rules for classification: League phase tiebreakers

Round	1	2	3	4	5	6	7	8
Ground	H	A	H	A	A	H	A	H
Result	W	D	D	W				
Position	2	10	14	13				
Points	3	4	5	8				

Updated to match(es) played on 3 November 2026. Source: UEFA
A = Away; H = Home; W = Win; D = Draw; L = Loss

10 September 2026 1	Bayern Munich (Germany)	5–0	(Norway) Bodø/Glimt	Munich, Germany
21:00 CEST	Musiala 47'; Kane 61'; Davies 77'; Olise 83', 90+2'	Report	Fet (yellow card) 58'; Bjørtuft (red card) 87'	Stadium: Allianz Arena; Attendance: 75,000; Referee: Rade Obrenović (Slovenia)

13 October 2026 2	Viking (Norway)	3–3	(Germany) Bayern Munich	Stavanger, Norway
21:00 CEST	Stensness 2'; Christiansen 38'; K. Haugen (yellow card) 53'; Daland (yellow card) 68'; H. Haugen 90'	Report	Laimer (yellow card) 52'; Kane 54' (pen.), 60'; Saibari (yellow card) 68'; Díaz 71'; Olise (yellow card) 74' (yellow-red card) 74'	Stadium: Viking Stadion; Attendance: 15,466; Referee: Georgi Kabakov (Bulgaria)

21 October 2026 3	Bayern Munich (Germany)	2–2	(England) Arsenal	Munich, Germany
21:00 CEST	Davies 35'; Kane 61' (pen.)	Report	Havertz (yellow card) 13'; Eze 25'; Konsa (yellow card) 39'; Rice 82'	Stadium: Allianz Arena; Attendance: 75,000; Referee: Davide Massa (Italy)

3 November 2026 4	Atlético Madrid (Spain)	0–2	(Germany) Bayern Munich	Madrid, Spain
21:00 CET	Simeone (yellow card) 79'	Report	Karl 54'; Kimmich (yellow card) 57'; Laimer 74'; Stanišić (yellow card) 90+1'	Stadium: Metropolitano Stadium; Attendance: 69,821; Referee: François Letexier (France)

25 November 2026 5	Lille (France)	v	(Germany) Bayern Munich	Villeneuve-d'Ascq, France
21:00 CET		Report		Stadium: Stade Pierre-Mauroy

8 December 2026 6	Bayern Munich (Germany)	v	(Czech Republic) Slavia Prague	Munich, Germany
21:00 CET		Report		Stadium: Allianz Arena

20 January 2027 7	Manchester United (England)	v	(Germany) Bayern Munich	Manchester, England
20:00 GMT		Report		Stadium: Old Trafford

27 January 2027 8	Bayern Munich (Germany)	v	(Spain) Real Betis	Munich, Germany
21:00 CET		Report		Stadium: Allianz Arena

== Statistics ==
=== Appearances and goals ===
No.	Pos	Nat	Player	Total		Bundesliga		DFB-Pokal		Franz Beckenbauer Supercup		Champions League	
No.	Pos	Nat	Player	Apps	Goals	Apps	Goals	Apps	Goals	Apps	Goals	Apps	Goals
Goalkeepers
1	GK	(Germany) GER	Manuel Neuer	8	0	4	0	0	0	1	0	3	0
26	GK	(Germany) GER	Sven Ulreich	0	0	0	0	0	0	0	0	0	0
35	GK	(Germany) GER	Jannis Bärtl	0	0	0	0	0	0	0	0	0	0
38	GK	(Germany) GER	David Podar-Știube	0	0	0	0	0	0	0	0	0	0
40	GK	(Germany) GER	Jonas Urbig	7	0	4	0	2	0	0	0	1	0
	GK	(Germany) GER	Leon Klanac	0	0	0	0	0	0	0	0	0	0
	GK	(Germany) GER	Leonard Prescott	0	0	0	0	0	0	0	0	0	0
Defenders
2	DF	(France) FRA	Dayot Upamecano	12	3	8	3	0	0	0	0	3+1	0
3	DF	(South Korea) KOR	Kim Min-jae	10	0	4+1	0	1	0	1	0	2+1	0
4	DF	(Germany) GER	Jonathan Tah	12	0	4+1	0	2	0	1	0	3+1	0
11	DF	(Germany) GER	Nathaniel Brown	14	3	5+3	1	2	1	1	1	1+2	0
19	DF	(Canada) CAN	Alphonso Davies	14	3	5+2	0	0+2	1	0+1	0	3+1	2
21	DF	(Japan) JPN	Hiroki Itō	4	0	0+1	0	1	0	0	0	0+2	0
23	DF	(France) FRA	Sacha Boey	4	0	0+2	0	0+1	0	0	0	0+1	0
30	DF	(Germany) GER	Cassiano Kiala	0	0	0	0	0	0	0	0	0	0
43	DF	(Croatia) CRO	Filip Pavić	0	0	0	0	0	0	0	0	0	0
44	DF	(Croatia) CRO	Josip Stanišić	14	0	4+3	0	2	0	1	0	2+2	0
	DF	(Germany) GER	Tarek Buchmann	0	0	0	0	0	0	0	0	0	0
	DF	(Germany) GER	Vincent Manuba	0	0	0	0	0	0	0	0	0	0
Midfielders
6	MF	(Germany) GER	Joshua Kimmich	12	0	6+1	0	1	0	1	0	3	0
8	MF	(Germany) GER	Tom Bischof	14	1	2+5	0	2	1	0+1	0	3+1	0
10	MF	(Germany) GER	Jamal Musiala	4	2	1+2	1	0	0	0	0	1	1
27	MF	(Austria) AUT	Konrad Laimer	12	2	5	1	1+1	0	1	0	4	1
34	MF	(Morocco) MAR	Ismael Saibari	14	3	5+3	2	2	1	0+1	0	1+2	0
39	MF	(Senegal) SEN	Bara Sapoko Ndiaye	2	0	0	0	0+1	0	0	0	0+1	0
42	MF	(Germany) GER	Lennart Karl	13	2	3+4	1	1+1	0	0	0	2+2	1
45	MF	(Germany) GER	Aleksandar Pavlović	12	2	7	2	0+2	0	2	0	1	0
47	MF	(Portugal) POR	David Santos Daiber	1	1	0	0	0+1	1	0	0	0	0
	MF	(Italy) ITA	Guido Della Rovere	0	0	0	0	0	0	0	0	0	0
	MF	(Kosovo) KOS	Erblin Osmani	0	0	0	0	0	0	0	0	0	0
Forwards
7	FW	(Germany) GER	Serge Gnabry	7	1	2+3	1	1	0	0	0	1	0
9	FW	(England) ENG	Harry Kane	14	10	7+1	4	1	2	1	0	4	4
14	FW	(Colombia) COL	Luis Díaz	11	5	5+1	4	1	0	1	0	2+1	1
17	FW	(France) FRA	Michael Olise	14	12	7+1	6	2	3	1	1	3	2
46	FW	(Germany) GER	Tim Binder	1	0	0	0	0+1	0	0	0	0	0
48	FW	(Germany) GER	Bastian Assomo	0	0	0	0	0	0	0	0	0	0
49	FW	(Brazil) BRA	Maycon Cardozo	0	0	0	0	0	0	0	0	0	0
Players transferred/loaned out during the season
16	MF	(Portugal) POR	João Palhinha	0	0	0	0	0	0	0	0	0	0
22	MF	(Germany) GER	Arijon Ibrahimović	0	0	0	0	0	0	0	0	0	0
28	FW	(Spain) ESP	Bryan Zaragoza	0	0	0	0	0	0	0	0	0	0
32	MF	(Peru) PER	Felipe Chávez	0	0	0	0	0	0	0	0	0	0
36	FW	(Germany) GER	Wisdom Mike	0	0	0	0	0	0	0	0	0	0

Last updated: 3 November 2026
Source: Competitions

=== Goalscorers ===
The list is sorted by squad number when total goals are equal.

Rank	No.	Pos.	Nat.	Player	Bundesliga	DFB-Pokal	Franz Beckenbauer Supercup	Champions League	Total
1	17	FW	(France)	Michael Olise	6	3	1	2	12
2	9	FW	(England)	Harry Kane	4	2	0	4	10
3	14	FW	(Colombia)	Luis Díaz	4	0	0	1	5
4	2	DF	(France)	Dayot Upamecano	3	0	0	0	3
4	11	DF	(Germany)	Nathaniel Brown	1	1	1	0	3
4	19	DF	(Canada)	Alphonso Davies	0	1	0	2	3
4	34	MF	(Morocco)	Ismael Saibari	2	1	0	0	3
8	10	MF	(Germany)	Jamal Musiala	1	0	0	1	2
8	27	MF	(Austria)	Konrad Laimer	1	0	0	1	2
8	42	MF	(Germany)	Lennart Karl	1	0	0	1	2
8	45	MF	(Germany)	Aleksandar Pavlović	2	0	0	0	2
12	7	FW	(Germany)	Serge Gnabry	1	0	0	0	1
12	8	MF	(Germany)	Tom Bischof	0	1	0	0	1
12	47	MF	(Portugal)	David Santos Daiber	0	1	0	0	1
Own goals					1	0	0	0	1
Totals					27	10	2	12	51

Last updated: 3 November 2026.
Source: Competitions

=== Assists ===
The list is sorted by squad number when total assists are equal.

Rank	No.	Pos.	Nat.	Player	Bundesliga	DFB-Pokal	Franz Beckenbauer Supercup	Champions League	Total
1	9	FW	(England)	Harry Kane	7	0	0	3	10
2	17	FW	(France)	Michael Olise	3	1	1	1	6
3	6	MF	(Germany)	Joshua Kimmich	3	0	0	1	4
4	19	FW	(Canada)	Alphonso Davies	2	1	0	0	3
4	34	MF	(Morocco)	Ismael Saibari	3	0	0	0	3
4	42	FW	(Germany)	Lennart Karl	0	2	0	1	3
7	8	MF	(Germany)	Tom Bischof	2	0	0	0	2
7	11	DF	(Germany)	Nathaniel Brown	2	0	0	0	2
7	14	FW	(Colombia)	Luis Díaz	1	1	0	0	2
7	45	FW	(Germany)	Aleksandar Pavlović	1	1	0	0	2
11	10	MF	(Germany)	Jamal Musiala	1	0	0	0	1
11	27	MF	(Austria)	Konrad Laimer	0	0	0	1	1
11	34	MF	(Morocco)	Ismael Saibari	0	1	0	0	1
11	44	DF	(Croatia)	Josip Stanišić	0	1	0	0	1
Totals					23	8	1	6	38

Last updated: 3 November 2026.
Source: FBref.com
