= Noah Codjo-Evora =

French footballer (born 2007)

Personal information
- Date of birth: 16 August 2007 (age 19)
- Place of birth: Bron, France
- Height: 1.94 m (6 ft 4 in)
- Position: Forward

Team information
- Current team: Bayern Munich
- Number: 36

Youth career
- Ain Sud
- –2023: Villefranche
- 2023–2024: Annecy
- 2024–: Bayern Munich

Senior career*
Years	Team	Apps	(Gls)
2026–	Bayern Munich II	15	(4)
2026–	Bayern Munich	1	(0)
- * Club domestic league appearances and goals as of 21:24, 20 November 2026 (UTC)

Noah Codjo-Evora (born 16 August 2007) is a French professional footballer who plays as a forward for Bundesliga club Bayern Munich.

== Club career ==
Codjo-Evora is a youth product of Ain Sud and Villefranche. In 2023 he moved to French Ligue 2 club Annecy's academy, and on 1 July 2024, he moved to Germany, joining the youth academy of Bundesliga giants Bayern Munich.

He received his first call-up with Bayern Munich II during the 2025–26 season and made his professional debut on 1 April 2026, in a 1–0 away loss Regionalliga Bayern match against SV Wacker Burghausen, substituting Michael Scott at the 64th minute. On 16 May of the same year, Codjo-Evora featured for the second time with Bayern Munich II , substituting Julien Yanda at the second half of a 5–0 away win Regionalliga Bayern match against Viktoria Aschaffenburg.

He received his first call-up with the Bayern Munich senior team on 20 November 2026, and made his debut substituting Aleksandar Pavlović during the second half of a 1–1 home draw Bundesliga match against 1. FC Köln.

== Personal life ==
Born in Bron, France, he is of Beninese descent. Codjo-Evora holds dual French and Portuguese citizenship.

== Career statistics ==
As of match played 20 November 2026

Appearances and goals by club, season and competition
Club	Season	League			Cup		Total	
Club	Season	Division	Apps	Goals	Apps	Goals	Apps	Goals
Bayern Munich II	2025–26	Regionalliga Bayern	2	0	—		2	0
Bayern Munich II	2026–27	Regionalliga Bayern	13	4	—		13	4
Bayern Munich II	Total		15	4	—		15	4
Bayern Munich	2026–27	Bundesliga	1	0	0	0	1	0
Career Total			16	4	0	0	16	4
