= Richard Ajayi =

Nigerian footballer (born 2009)

Personal information
- Date of birth: 24 December 2009 (age 16)
- Place of birth: Nigeria
- Positions: Left-back; left midfielder; left winger

Team information
- Current team: Bayern Munich II

Youth career
- Stars-To-Be Football Club
- –2022: 1. FC Garmisch-Partenkirchen
- 2022–: Bayern Munich

Senior career*
Years	Team	Apps	(Gls)
2026–	Bayern Munich II	12	(0)
- * Club domestic league appearances and goals as of 7 November 2026

Richard Ajayi (born 24 December 2009) is a Nigerian professional footballer who plays as a left-back, left midfielder and left winger for Regionalliga Bayern club Bayern Munich II.

== Club career ==
=== Bayern Munich ===
Ajayi started playing football with the Badagry-based amateur team Stars-To-Be Football Club, and later moved to Germany joining the youth academy of 1. FC Garmisch-Partenkirchen, in 2022 he moved to the youth academy of Bundesliga giants Bayern Munich.

He was called-up with the senior team by head coach Vincent Kompany for the 2026–27 pre-season matches, starting during the 2–1 away loss friendly match against SV Wehen Wiesbaden on 25 July 2026. Ajayi was also promoted to the reserve team Bayern Munich II by head coach Dante for the 2026–27 season, and made his professional debut as a starter during a 2–0 away loss Regionalliga Bayern match against SV Wacker Burghausen, on 31 July 2026. The following month he assisted Allen Junior Lambé for his team's only goal during the 2–1 home loss Regionalliga Bayern match against FC Memmingen, on 25 August 2026. Eventually becoming a regular starter as left-back around mid-season, along with teammate Kim Do-yeon.

== Career statistics ==
As of match played 7 November 2026

Appearances and goals by club, season and competition
Club	Season	League			Cup		Total	
Club	Season	Division	Apps	Goals	Apps	Goals	Apps	Goals
Bayern Munich II	2026–27	Regionalliga Bayern	12	0	—		12	0
Bayern Munich II	Total		12	0	—		12	0
Career Total			12	0	0	0	12	0
