= Yll Gashi =

German footballer (born 2008)

Personal information
- Date of birth: 17 January 2008 (age 18)
- Height: 1.78 m (5 ft 10 in)
- Positions: Attacking midfielder; forward; winger

Team information
- Current team: Bayern Munich II

Youth career
- 2016–2020: Füchse Berlin Reinickendorf
- 2020–2022: Hertha BSC
- 2022–: Bayern Munich

Senior career*
Years	Team	Apps	(Gls)
2026–	Bayern Munich II	17	(1)

International career^{‡}
2023–2024	Germany U16	6	(3)
2024–2025	Germany U17	15	(1)
2025–	Germany U18	4	(1)
2026–	Germany U19	3	(1)
- * Club domestic league appearances and goals as of 7 November 2026 ‡ National team caps and goals as of 26 May 2026

Yll Gashi (born 17 January 2008) is a German professional footballer who plays as an attacking midfielder, forward and winger for Regionalliga Bayern club Bayern Munich II. He is a German youth international.

== Club career ==
He is a youth product of Füchse Berlin Reinickendorf and Hertha BSC, later joining the youth academy of Bundesliga giants Bayern Munich in 2022.

Gashi, along with French Ligue 1 club Paris Saint-Germain under-17's Pierre Mounguengue, were the top goalscorers of the 2025 Future Cup, for which Bayern Munich U17s lost 1–0 against Dutch Eredivisie club Ajax U17s at the final.

He received his first call-up with Bayern Munich II during the 2025–26 season on 21 March 2026, in a 1–1 away draw Regionalliga Bayern match against Greuther Fürth II, as an unused substitute however.

Gashi made his professional debut with Bayern Munich II on 6 April 2026, during a 1–0 home win Regionalliga Bayern match against DJK Vilzing, substituting Michael Scott at the 90th minute. He scored his first professional goal as a starter during a 4–1 away loss Regionalliga Bayern match against 1. FC Nürnberg II, on 21 April.

== International career ==
Gashi is eligible to represent Germany, Kosovo, and Albania internationally. He has represented Germany at the under-16, under-17, under-18 and under-19 levels.

On 8 October 2026 Kosovo manager Bajram Shala announced that Gashi had decided to represent Kosovo at international level.

== Career statistics ==
As of match played 7 November 2026

Appearances and goals by club, season and competition
Club	Season	League			Cup		Total			
Club	Season	Division	Apps	Goals	Apps	Goals	Apps	Goals		
Bayern Munich II	2025–26	Regionalliga Bayern	4	1	—		4	1		
Bayern Munich II	2026–27	Regionalliga Bayern	13	0	—		—		13	0
Bayern Munich II	Total		17	1	—		17	1		
Career Total			17	1	0	0	17	1		
