= Simon Zöls =

German footballer (born 2007)

Personal information
- Date of birth: 12 March 2007 (age 19)
- Place of birth: Munich, Germany
- Height: 1.82 m (6 ft 0 in)
- Positions: Forward; attacking midfielder

Team information
- Current team: VfL Sportfreunde Lotte
- Number: 11

Youth career
- 2012–2016: SV Haimhausen
- 2016–2018: ASV Dachau
- 2018–2026: Bayern Munich

Senior career*
Years	Team	Apps	(Gls)
2026	Bayern Munich II	3	(0)
2026–	VfL Sportfreunde Lotte	4	(1)
- * Club domestic league appearances and goals as of 26 September 2026

Simon Zöls (born 12 March 2007) is a German professional footballer who plays as a forward and attacking midfielder for Regionalliga West club VfL Sportfreunde Lotte.

== Club career ==
=== Bayern Munich ===
Zöls is a youth product of SV Haimhausen and ASV Dachau. He joined the Bayern Munich academy in 2018, and received his first call-up with Bayern Munich II during the 2025–26 season on 1 April 2026, in a 1–0 away loss Regionalliga Bayern match against SV Wacker Burghausen, as an unused substitute however. Five days later, Zöls was called-up once again on April 6, during a 1–0 home win Regionalliga Bayern match against DJK Vilzing, but did not play. Four days later he made his professional debut, substituting Deniz Ofli at the 61st minute of a 2–1 away loss Regionalliga Bayern match against Würzburger Kickers, on 10 April. Seven days later Zöls saw his second appearance with Bayern Munich II, substituting Ljubo Puljić at the 88th minute of a 2–1 home loss Regionalliga Bayern match against SpVgg Ansbach, on April 17. He saw his third appearance for Bayern Munich II seven days later, substituting Michael Scott late in the second half of a 1–0 home win Regionalliga Bayern match against TSV Aubstadt, on April 24. Zöls left Bayern Munich on 30 June 2026, after his contract with the club expired.

=== VfL Sportfreunde Lotte ===
On 3 September 2026, he signed with Regionalliga West club VfL Sportfreunde Lotte as a free agent, ahead of the 2026–27 season.

== Career statistics ==
As of match played 24 April 2026

Appearances and goals by club, season and competition
Club	Season	League			Cup		Total	
Club	Season	Division	Apps	Goals	Apps	Goals	Apps	Goals
Bayern Munich II	2025–26	Regionalliga Bayern	3	0	—		3	0
Bayern Munich II	Total		3	0	—		3	0
Career Total			3	0	0	0	3	0
