= Roko Mijatović =

Croatian footballer (born 2008)

Personal information
- Date of birth: 13 February 2008 (age 18)
- Place of birth: Bielefeld, Germany
- Positions: Centre-back; midfielder

Team information
- Current team: Bayern Munich II

Youth career
- 2020–2022: FC Ingolstadt 04
- 2022–: Bayern Munich

Senior career*
Years	Team	Apps	(Gls)
2025–	Bayern Munich II	4	(0)

International career^{‡}
2022–2023	Croatia U15	2	(0)
2024–2025	Croatia U17	11	(0)
2026–	Croatia U19	2	(0)
- * Club domestic league appearances and goals as of 11 September 2026 ‡ National team caps and goals as of 23:45, 1 October 2026 (UTC)

Roko Mijatović (born 13 February 2008) is a professional footballer who plays as a centre-back and midfielder for Regionalliga Bayern club Bayern Munich II. Born in Germany, he is a Croatian youth international.

== Early life ==
Mijatović was born in Bielefeld, Germany, while his father Andre Mijatović was playing for Arminia Bielefeld, and started his youth career with FC Ingolstadt 04, the same club with whom his father played for and retired professionally.

== Club career ==
After his stint with FC Ingolstadt 04, he joined the Bayern Munich academy in 2022. Mijatović was called up to train with the first team by head coach Vincent Kompany in early 2025, along with Cassiano Kiala, Magnus Dalpiaz and Julien Yanda.

In July 2025, he extended his contract with Bayern Munich until June 2028. Mijatović was promoted to the Bayern Munich II team and included in its squad list ahead of the 2025–26 season, but an injury prevented him from getting called-up and debuting professionally.

He made his professional debut with Bayern Munich II during the first matchday of the 2026–27 Regionalliga Bayern, as a starter in a 1–0 home loss against SC Eltersdorf, on 24 July 2026.

== International career ==
He holds dual German and Croatian citizenship, making him eligible to represent either nation.

Mijatović is a Croatian youth international, having made his debut for Croatia U15 against Republic of Ireland U15 during a 3–2 win on 24 October 2022. He made his debut for Croatia U17 against Scotland U17 during a 5–1 win on 18 August 2024.

In September 2026, Mijatović was called up with the U19s team.

== Career statistics ==
As of match played 11 September 2026

Appearances and goals by club, season and competition
Club	Season	League			Cup		Total	
Club	Season	Division	Apps	Goals	Apps	Goals	Apps	Goals
Bayern Munich II	2026–27	Regionalliga Bayern	4	0	—		4	0
Bayern Munich II	Total		4	0	—		4	0
Career Total			4	0	0	0	4	0
