= David Santos Daiber =

Portuguese footballer (born 2007)

Personal information
- Full name: David Michael Santos Daiber
- Date of birth: 10 January 2007 (age 19)
- Place of birth: Luxembourg
- Height: 1.85 m (6 ft 1 in)
- Position: Midfielder

Team information
- Current team: Bayern Munich
- Number: 47

Youth career
- 2014–2016: TSV Milbertshofen
- 2016–2026: Bayern Munich

Senior career*
Years	Team	Apps	(Gls)
2025–	Bayern Munich	2	(0)
2026–	Bayern Munich II	10	(1)

International career^{‡}
2023–2024	Portugal U17	10	(0)
2024–2025	Portugal U18	4	(0)
2025–	Portugal U19	6	(0)
2026–	Portugal U20	5	(0)
- * Club domestic league appearances and goals as of 23:45, 7 November 2026 (UTC) ‡ National team caps and goals as of 16 November 2026

David Michael Santos Daiber (born 10 January 2007) is a professional footballer who plays as a midfielder for Bundesliga club Bayern Munich. Born in Luxembourg, he is a Portugal youth international.

== Club career ==
=== Bayern Munich ===
As a youth player, Santos Daiber played for the youth academy of TSV Milbertshofen in 2014. Following his stint there, he joined the youth academy of Bundesliga side Bayern Munich in 2016.

On 11 June 2025, Bayern Munich announced their 32-player final squad for the FIFA Club World Cup, which included Santos Daiber.

He was one of the players that were called up by Bayern Munich head coach Vincent Kompany, for the 2025 pre-season matches against French Ligue 1 club Lyon, English Premier League club Tottenham Hotspur, and Swiss Super League club Grasshopper, on 2, 7, and 12 August 2025, respectively. Santos Daiber was a starter for the match against Grasshopper, which Bayern Munich won 2–1.

On 17 September 2025, he received his first call-up with the senior team for the 3–1 home win UEFA Champions League match against English Premier League club Chelsea, as an unused substitute however. On 18 October 2025, Santos Daiber was called up for the 2–1 home win Bundesliga match against Borussia Dortmund (Der Klassiker), although he did not play. He made his professional debut on 21 December of the same year, substituting Raphaël Guerreiro at the second half of a 4–0 away win Bundesliga match against 1. FC Heidenheim.

Santos Daiber was called up as a starter for the 5–0 win friendly match against Austrian Bundesliga club Red Bull Salzburg on 6 January 2026.

He made his debut with Bayern Munich II on 24 February 2026, starting for a 1–0 home win Regionalliga Bayern match against SpVgg Unterhaching.

On 23 March 2026, Santos Daiber signed his first professional contract, extending until 2030.

He was called up with the senior team during the 2026–27 season on 25 October 2026, for the 3–1 away win Bundesliga match against SC Freiburg, as an unused substitute however. Three days later he scored his first professional goal, with the senior team, substituting Tom Bischof during the second half of a 6–1 home win 2026–27 DFB-Pokal second round match against 2. Bundesliga club 1. FC Magdeburg, and scoring the last goal, on 28 October.

== International career ==
Born in Luxembourg, he holds dual German and Portuguese citizenship, being eligible to represent either nation.

Santos Daiber has represented Portugal at under-17, under-18 and under-19 levels. On 18 September 2026, he was called up with the U20s team.

== Career statistics ==
As of match played 7 November 2026

Appearances and goals by club, season and competition
Club	Season	League			Cup (Note: Includes DFB-Pokal)		Europe		Other		Total	
Club	Season	Division	Apps	Goals	Apps	Goals	Apps	Goals	Apps	Goals	Apps	Goals
Bayern Munich	2024–25	Bundesliga	—		—		—		0	0	0	0
Bayern Munich	2025–26	Bundesliga	2	0	0	0	0	0	0	0	2	0
Bayern Munich	2026–27	Bundesliga	0	0	1	1	0	0	0	0	1	1
Bayern Munich	Total		2	0	1	1	0	0	0	0	3	1
Bayern Munich II	2025–26	Regionalliga Bayern	2	0	—		—		—		2	0
Bayern Munich II	2026–27	Regionalliga Bayern	8	1	—		—		—		8	1
Bayern Munich II	Total		10	1	—		—		0	0	10	1
Career Total			12	1	1	1	0	0	0	0	13	2
