= Tim Binder =

German footballer (born 2007)

Personal information
- Date of birth: 30 January 2007 (age 19)
- Place of birth: Augsburg, Germany
- Height: 1.78 m (5 ft 10 in)
- Positions: Winger; full-back

Team information
- Current team: Bayern Munich
- Number: 46

Youth career
- –2019: FC Augsburg
- 2019–2025: Bayern Munich

Senior career*
Years	Team	Apps	(Gls)
2024–	Bayern Munich II	25	(9)
2026–	Bayern Munich	1	(0)

International career^{‡}
2022	Germany U16	2	(0)
2024	Germany U17	1	(0)
2024	Germany U18	4	(1)
2025–	Germany U19	4	(0)
2026–	Germany U20	2	(0)
- * Club domestic league appearances and goals as of 21:24, 20 November 2026 (UTC) ‡ National team caps and goals as of 16 November 2026

Tim Binder (born 30 January 2007) is a German professional footballer who plays as a winger, wide midfielder and full-back for Bundesliga club Bayern Munich. He is a German youth international.

== Club career ==
=== Bayern Munich ===
As a youth player, Binder started his career with the youth academy of his hometown club FC Augsburg, and later joined the youth academy of Bundesliga side Bayern Munich in 2019.

He received his first call-up with Bayern Munich II on 30 August 2024, as an unused substitute during a 1–1 home draw on a Regionalliga Bayern match against DJK Vilzing. Binder made his professional debut some months later on 8 March 2025, starting for Bayern Munich II during a 3–0 away loss Regionalliga Bayern match against DJK Vilzing.

On early 2025, he extended his contract with Bayern Munich until 2027, along with teammates Bogdan Olychenko and Raphael Pavlić.

Binder was listed as part of the Bayern Munich's senior team squad for the 2025–26 UEFA Champions League.

On 9 September 2026, after impressing performances during the 2026–27 pre-season matches and getting registered with the first team for the season, he signed a contract extension with Bayern Munich until 2030.

Binder was called-up for the first time with the senior team during the 2026–27 season on 25 October 2026, for the 3–1 away win Bundesliga match against SC Freiburg, as an unused substitute however. Three days later he made his professional debut with the senior team, substituting Ismael Saibari during the second half of a 6–1 home win 2026–27 DFB-Pokal second round match against 2. Bundesliga club 1. FC Magdeburg, on 28 October.

On 20 November 2026, he made his Bundesliga debut substituting Michael Olise during the second half of a 1–1 home draw Bundesliga match against 1. FC Köln.

== International career ==
Binder has represented Germany at the under-16, under-17, under-18 and under-19 levels.

He was one of the players who were called up with the Germany U20 national team by head coach Hannes Wolf for the Under 20 Elite League matches against Poland and Czech Republic, 13 and 16 November 2026 respectively.

== Career statistics ==
As of match played 20 Novemer 2026

Appearances and goals by club, season and competition
Club	Season	League			Cup (Note: Includes DFB-Pokal)		Continental		Total	
Club	Season	Division	Apps	Goals	Apps	Goals	Apps	Goals	Apps	Goals
Bayern Munich II	2024–25	Regionalliga Bayern	8	4	—		—		8	4
Bayern Munich II	2025–26	Regionalliga Bayern	12	3	—		—		12	3
Bayern Munich II	2026–27	Regionalliga Bayern	5	2	—		—		5	2
Bayern Munich II	Total		25	9	—		—		25	9
Bayern Munich	2026–27	Bundesliga	1	0	1	0	0	0	2	0
Bayern Munich	Total		1	0	1	0	0	0	2	0
Career Total			26	9	1	0	0	0	27	9
