= Michael Matošević =

Austrian footballer (born 2008)

Personal information
- Date of birth: 29 February 2008 (age 18)
- Positions: Midfielder; right-back

Team information
- Current team: Bayern Munich II

Youth career
- 2014–2017: FC Wels
- 2017–2024: SV Ried
- 2024–: Bayern Munich

Senior career*
Years	Team	Apps	(Gls)
2026–	Bayern Munich II	5	(0)

International career^{‡}
2025	Austria U17	1	(0)
2026–	Austria U18	1	(0)
2026–	Austria U19	7	(0)
- * Club domestic league appearances and goals as of 31 October 2026 ‡ National team caps and goals as of 14 November 2026

Michael Matošević (born 29 February 2008) is an Austrian professional footballer who plays as a midfielder and right-back for Regionalliga Bayern club Bayern Munich II. He is an Austrian youth international.

== Club career ==
Matošević is a youth product of Austrian clubs FC Wels and SV Ried, later moving to Germany and joining the youth academy of Bundesliga giants Bayern Munich in 2024, ahead of the 2024–25 season.

He made his professional debut with Bayern Munich II during the second matchday of the 2026–27 Regionalliga Bayern, as a starter in the 2–0 away loss against SV Wacker Burghausen, on 31 July 2026.

== International career ==
He is an Austrian youth international, having featured with the under-17, under-18 and under-19 teams.

== Career statistics ==
As of match played 31 October 2026

Appearances and goals by club, season and competition
Club	Season	League			Cup		Total	
Club	Season	Division	Apps	Goals	Apps	Goals	Apps	Goals
Bayern Munich II	2026–27	Regionalliga Bayern	5	0	—		5	0
Bayern Munich II	Total		5	0	—		5	0
Career Total			5	0	0	0	5	0

== Personal life ==
Matošević is the son of former female handball player Ane Martinović Matošević, he is from Croatian descent.
