= Matteo Marić =

Austrian footballer (born 2010)

Personal information
- Full name: Matteo Silvio Marić
- Date of birth: 25 February 2010 (age 16)
- Place of birth: Linz, Austria
- Height: 1.92 m (6 ft 4 in)
- Position: Midfielder

Team information
- Current team: Bayern Munich II

Youth career
- 2015–2022: LASK
- 2018–2022: FC Juniors OÖ
- 2022–2024: Blau-Weiß Linz
- 2024–2026: Red Bull Salzburg
- 2026–: Bayern Munich

Senior career*
Years	Team	Apps	(Gls)
2026–	Bayern Munich II	1	(0)

International career^{‡}
2025	Austria U15	6	(2)
2025–	Austria U16	1	(1)
2025–	Austria U17	10	(0)
- * Club domestic league appearances and goals as of 24 July 2026 ‡ National team caps and goals as of 14 November 2026

Matteo Silvio Marić (born 25 February 2010) is an Austrian professional footballer who plays as a midfielder for the Regionalliga Bayern club Bayern Munich II. He is an Austrian youth international.

== Club career ==
Marić is a youth product of his hometown clubs LASK and Blau-Weiß Linz, later moving to the youth academy of Austrian Bundesliga club Red Bull Salzburg in 2024.

On 30 March 2026, German Bundesliga club Bayern Munich announced his signing from Red Bull Salzburg, set to initially join the FC Bayern Campus at the beginning of the 2026–27 season.

Marić made his professional debut with Bayern Munich II during the first matchday of the 2026–27 Regionalliga Bayern, substituting Luis Schäfer at the second half of a 1–0 home loss against SC Eltersdorf, on 24 July 2026.

== International career ==
Born in Linz, Austria, he is of Croatian and Bosnian descent. Marić is an Austrian youth international since 2025, having featured with the under-15, under-16 and under-17 teams.

== Career statistics ==
As of match played 24 July 2026

Appearances and goals by club, season and competition
Club	Season	League			Cup		Total	
Club	Season	Division	Apps	Goals	Apps	Goals	Apps	Goals
Bayern Munich II	2026–27	Regionalliga Bayern	1	0	—		1	0
Bayern Munich II	Total		1	0	—		1	0
Career Total			1	0	0	0	1	0
