= Jannis Bärtl =

German footballer (born 2006)

Personal information
- Full name: Jannis Gerhard Bärtl
- Date of birth: 24 June 2006 (age 20)
- Place of birth: Regensburg, Germany
- Height: 1.83 m (6 ft 0 in)
- Position: Goalkeeper

Team information
- Current team: Bayern Munich II

Youth career
- 2013–2025: Bayern Munich
- 2023–2025: → Karlsruher SC (loan)

Senior career*
| Years | Team | Apps | (Gls) |
| 2025– | Bayern Munich II | 33 | (0) |
| 2025– | Bayern Munich | 0 | (0) |
- * Club domestic league appearances and goals as of 7 November 2026

Jannis Gerhard Bärtl (born 24 June 2006) is a German professional footballer who plays as a goalkeeper for Regionalliga Bayern club Bayern Munich II.

== Club career ==
=== Early career ===
Born in Regensburg, Germany, Bärtl started his career with the youth academy of Bundesliga side Bayern Munich in 2013. On 2 July 2023, he joined the youth academy of Karlsruher SC on loan, with whom he continued his development until 2025, before returning to Bayern Munich.

=== Bayern Munich ===
He was one of the players that were called up by Bayern Munich head coach Vincent Kompany for the last 2025 pre-season friendly match against Red Eagles Austria on 23 August 2025, substituting Sven Ulreich at the 75th minute during a 3–1 win.

Upon returning with Bayern Munich he was immediately promoted to the reserve team, and received his first call-up with Bayern Munich II on 25 July 2025, for a 2–1 away win Regionalliga Bayern match against FC Augsburg II, as an unused substitute however. Bärtl made his professional debut with Bayern Munich II a month later on 29 August, starting for a 4–1 away win Regionalliga Bayern match against FC Memmingen. One day later he received his first call-up with the Bayern Munich senior team, during a 3–2 away win Bundesliga match against FC Augsburg.

Bärtl was listed as part of the Bayern Munich's senior team squad for the 2025–26 UEFA Champions League.

He was called-up with the senior team during the 2026–27 season on 25 October 2026, for the 3–1 away win Bundesliga match against SC Freiburg, as an unused substitute however.

== Career statistics ==
As of match played 7 November 2026

Appearances and goals by club, season and competition
| Club | Season | League | | | Cup | | Continental | | Total | |
| Club | Season | Division | Apps | Goals | Apps | Goals | Apps | Goals | Apps | Goals |
|---|---|---|---|---|---|---|---|---|---|---|
| Bayern Munich II | 2025–26 | Regionalliga Bayern | 19 | 0 | — | | — | | 19 | 0 |
| Bayern Munich II | 2026–27 | Regionalliga Bayern | 14 | 0 | — | | — | | 14 | 0 |
| Bayern Munich II | Total | | 33 | 0 | — | | — | | 33 | 0 |
| Bayern Munich | 2025–26 | Bundesliga | 0 | 0 | 0 | 0 | 0 | 0 | 0 | 0 |
| Bayern Munich | 2026–27 | Bundesliga | 0 | 0 | 0 | 0 | 0 | 0 | 0 | 0 |
| Bayern Munich | Total | | 0 | 0 | 0 | 0 | 0 | 0 | 0 | 0 |
| Career Total | | | 33 | 0 | 0 | 0 | 0 | 0 | 33 | 0 |
