= Aleksandar Pavlović =

Aleksandar Pavlović may refer to:

- Aleksandar Pavlović (basketball) (born 1983), Serbian-Montenegrin basketball player
- Aleksandar Pavlović (footballer) (born 2004), German footballer
