= Raphael Pavlić =

German footballer (born 2008)

Personal information
- Date of birth: 8 February 2008 (age 18)
- Place of birth: Munich, Germany
- Position: Centre-back

Team information
- Current team: Bayern Munich II

Youth career
- –2016: FC Teutonia München
- 2016–: Bayern Munich

Senior career*
Years	Team	Apps	(Gls)
2026–	Bayern Munich II	6	(0)

International career^{‡}
2023	Germany U15	2	(0)
2023	Germany U16	2	(0)
2025	Germany U17	5	(0)
2025–	Germany U18	3	(0)
- * Club domestic league appearances and goals as of 7 November 2026 ‡ National team caps and goals as of 18 November 2025

Raphael Pavlić (born 8 February 2008) is a German professional footballer who plays as a centre-back for Regionalliga Bayern club Bayern Munich II. He is a German youth international.

== Club career ==
Pavlić started his youth career with FC Teutonia München, and in 2016 he moved to the youth academy of Bundesliga giants Bayern Munich. On early 2025, he extended his contract with Bayern Munich until 2027, along with teammates Tim Binder and Bogdan Olychenko. Pavlić was also called up by Bayern Munich's head coach Vincent Kompany to train with the first team during the 2024–25 season.

He received his first call-up and made his professional debut with Bayern Munich II as a starter during a 4–1 away loss Regionalliga Bayern match against 1. FC Nürnberg II, on 21 April 2026.

== International career ==
Pavlić was born in Munich, Germany, he has represented Germany at the under-15, under-16, under-17 and under-18 levels.

== Career statistics ==
As of match played 7 November 2026

Appearances and goals by club, season and competition
Club	Season	League			Cup		Total			
Club	Season	Division	Apps	Goals	Apps	Goals	Apps	Goals		
Bayern Munich II	2025–26	Regionalliga Bayern	1	0	—		1	0		
Bayern Munich II	2026–27	Regionalliga Bayern	5	0	—		—		5	0
Bayern Munich II	Total		6	0	—		6	0		
Career Total			6	0	0	0	6	0		
