= Leon Klanac =

German footballer (born 2007)

Personal information
- Date of birth: 1 March 2007 (age 19)
- Place of birth: Gräfelfing, Germany
- Height: 1.85 m (6 ft 1 in)
- Position: Goalkeeper

Team information
- Current team: Bayern Munich II

Youth career
- –2021: FC Augsburg
- 2021–2025: Bayern Munich

Senior career*
Years	Team	Apps	(Gls)
2024–	Bayern Munich	0	(0)
2025–	Bayern Munich II	16	(0)

International career^{‡}
2022	Germany U15	1	(0)
2022–2023	Germany U16	4	(0)
2023–2024	Germany U17	4	(0)
2024	Germany U18	2	(0)
2025–	Germany U19	3	(0)
- * Club domestic league appearances and goals as of 31 October 2026 ‡ National team caps and goals as of 18 November 2025

Leon Klanac (born 1 March 2007) is a German professional footballer who plays as a goalkeeper for Regionalliga Bayern club Bayern Munich II. He is a German youth international.

== Club career ==
As a youth player, Klanac joined the youth academy of FC Augsburg. Following his stint there, he joined the youth academy of Bundesliga side Bayern Munich in 2021.

He received his first call-up with the Bayern Munich first team on 10 December 2024, during a 5–1 away win UEFA Champions League match against Ukrainian Premier League club Shakhtar Donetsk, as an unused substitute however.

On 11 June 2025, Bayern Munich announced their 32-player final squad for the FIFA Club World Cup, which included Klanac.

He made his professional debut with Bayern Munich II during the 2025–26 season on 25 July 2025, starting in a 2–1 away win Regionalliga Bayern match against FC Augsburg II.

== International career ==
Klanac was born in Gräfelfing, Germany, he holds dual German and Croatian citizenship, and is eligible to represent either nation. He has represented Germany at the under-15, under-16, under-17, under-18 and under-19 levels.

== Career statistics ==
As of match played 31 October 2026

Appearances and goals by club, season and competition
Club	Season	League			DFB-Pokal		Europe		Other		Total	
Club	Season	Division	Apps	Goals	Apps	Goals	Apps	Goals	Apps	Goals	Apps	Goals
Bayern Munich	2024–25	Bundesliga	—		—		0	0	0	0	0	0
Bayern Munich	2025–26	Bundesliga	0	0	0	0	0	0	0	0	0	0
Bayern Munich	Total		0	0	0	0	0	0	0	0	0	0
Bayern Munich II	2025–26	Regionalliga Bayern	14	0	—		—		0	0	14	0
Bayern Munich II	2026–27	Regionalliga Bayern	2	0	—		—		0	0	2	0
Career total			16	0	0	0	0	0	0	0	16	0
