= Bara Sapoko Ndiaye =

Senegalese footballer (born 2007)

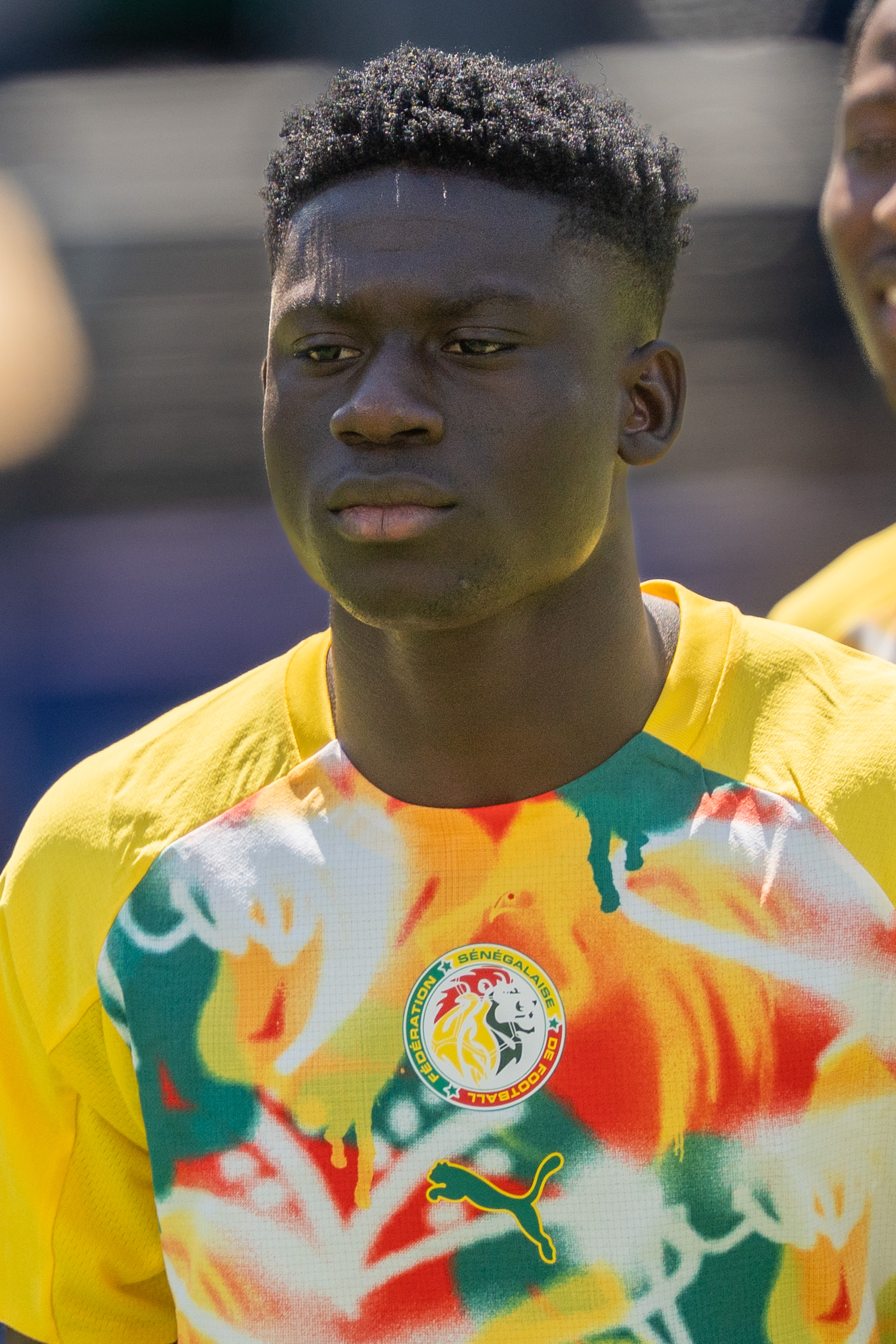
- Ndiaye with Senegal in 2026

Personal information
- Full name: Bara Sapoko Ndiaye
- Date of birth: 31 December 2007 (age 18)
- Place of birth: Meckhe, Senegal
- Height: 1.80 m (5 ft 11 in)
- Position: Midfielder

Team information
- Current team: Bayern Munich
- Number: 39

Youth career
- Thiès
- Senegal Elite Stars
- Gambinos Stars

Senior career*
Years	Team	Apps	(Gls)
2026	Gambinos Stars	0	(0)
2026	→ Bayern Munich (loan)	4	(0)
2026–	Bayern Munich	0	(0)

International career^{‡}
2026–	Senegal	4	(0)
- * Club domestic league appearances and goals as of 2 May 2026 ‡ National team caps and goals as of 4 October 2026

Bara Sapoko Ndiaye (born 31 December 2007) is a Senegalese professional footballer who plays as a midfielder for Bundesliga club Bayern Munich and the Senegal national team.

== Club career ==
=== Early career ===
Ndiaye was born in Meckhe, Senegal, and started his youth career with Thiès and Senegal Elite Stars. After his stint in home country, he joined the youth academy of Gambian side Gambinos Stars.

He made no appearances for the West Coast Region Third Division League club during the 2025–26 season, before his loan move to Bayern Munich.

==== Loan to Bayern Munich ====
In January 2026, three years after Red&Gold Football, the joint venture between German Bundesliga club Bayern Munich and American Major League Soccer (MLS) club Los Angeles FC became partners with Gambinos Stars back in 2023, Ndiaye moved to Germany and joined Bayern Munich on loan for the rest of the 2025–26 season, after previously having trialed with Swiss Super League side Grasshopper in 2025.

He made his professional debut with Bayern Munich on 11 April 2026, during a 5–0 away win Bundesliga match against FC St. Pauli, substituting Jamal Musiala in the second half. Eight days later, on April 19, Ndiaye won the 2025–26 Bundesliga and the 35th league title with Bayern Munich, substituting Raphaël Guerreiro at the 78th minute of a 4–2 home win over VfB Stuttgart. Six days later he made his first start, during a 4–3 comeback away win Bundesliga match against Mainz 05, on 25 April. Ndiaye made his second start with the club seven days later, during a 3–3 home draw Bundesliga match against 1. FC Heidenheim, on 2 May.

=== Bayern Munich ===
On 10 August 2026, he returned to Bayern Munich, on a permanent transfer ahead of the 2026–27 season, and signing a contract until 2031.

== International career ==
In May 2026, Ndiaye was called up by Senegal national team head coach Pape Thiaw to the preliminary squad for the 2026 FIFA World Cup between 11 June – 19 July 2026 and the pre-tournament friendlies against United States and Saudi Arabia on 31 May and 9 June 2026; respectively. He made the final list of the 26 players selected by Senegal for the World Cup. He made his World Cup debut as a substitute in extra time against Belgium in the Round of 32, which ended in a controversial 3–2 defeat.

== Style of play ==
Sapoko Ndiaye plays as a midfielder. Senegalese news website OnzeD'Afrik wrote in 2026 that he "stands out for his stamina, his ability to get forward, and his tactical intelligence".

== Career statistics ==
=== Club ===
As of match played 21 October 2026

Appearances and goals by club, season and competition
Club	Season	League			National cup (Note: Includes DFB-Pokal)		Continental		Other		Total	
Club	Season	Division	Apps	Goals	Apps	Goals	Apps	Goals	Apps	Goals	Apps	Goals
Gambinos Stars	2025–26	West Coast Region Third Division League	0	0	—		—		0	0	0	0
Bayern Munich (loan)	2025–26	Bundesliga	4	0	0	0	0	0	0	0	4	0
Bayern Munich	2026–27	Bundesliga	0	0	1	0	1 (Note: Appearances in UEFA Champions League)	0	0	0	2	0
Career total			4	0	1	0	1	0	0	0	6	0

=== International ===
As of match played 4 October 2026

Appearances and goals by national team and year
National team	Year	Apps	Goals
Senegal	2026	4	0
Total		4	0

== Honours ==
Bayern Munich

- Bundesliga: 2025–26
- Franz Beckenbauer Supercup: 2026
