= Kim Do-yeon (footballer, born 2008) =

South Korean footballer (born 2008)

Personal information
- Full name: Kim Do-yeon
- Date of birth: 21 February 2008 (age 18)
- Place of birth: South Korea
- Height: 1.74 m (5 ft 9 in)
- Positions: Full-back; winger

Team information
- Current team: Bayern Munich II

Youth career
- 2021–2026: Daejeon Hana Citizen

College career
Years	Team	Apps	(Gls)
2019–2020	Hannam University Youth FC		

Senior career*
Years	Team	Apps	(Gls)
2026	Daejeon Hana Citizen	0	(0)
2026–	Bayern Munich II	8	(0)

International career^{‡}
2023	South Korea U15	4	(0)
2024	South Korea U16	6	(0)
2025–	South Korea U17	12	(2)
- * Club domestic league appearances and goals as of 7 November 2026 (UTC) ‡ National team caps and goals as of 15 November 2025

Kim Do-yeon (Korean: 김도연; born 21 February 2008) is a South Korean professional footballer who plays as a full-back and winger for Regionalliga Bayern club Bayern Munich II. He is a South Korean youth international.

== Club career ==
Kim studied and played football at the Hannam University Youth FC from 2019 to 2020, the following year he joined the youth academy of Korean professional club Daejeon Hana Citizen in 2021, graduating from the club's academy five years later in 2026 (featuring with the U15s up to the U18s), receiving call-ups with the senior team for different matches during the same year, later on 27 August, he signed with German Bundesliga giants Bayern Munich, and was immediately assigned to the reserve team ahead of the 2026–27 Regionalliga season.

== International career ==
Kim is a South Korean youth international, having progressed from under-15 onwards. He represented the U17 national team at the 2025 AFC U-17 Asian Cup and the 2025 FIFA U-17 World Cup.
