= Richard Meier (footballer) =

German footballer (born 2004)

Personal information
- Full name: Richard Christian Meier
- Date of birth: 11 February 2004 (age 22)
- Place of birth: Burg bei Magdeburg, Germany
- Height: 1.93 m (6 ft 4 in)
- Positions: Striker; winger

Team information
- Current team: SV Meppen (on loan from Bayern Munich II)
- Number: 13

Youth career
- –2018: Burger BC 08
- 2018–2023: 1. FC Magdeburg

Senior career*
Years	Team	Apps	(Gls)
2022–2023	1. FC Magdeburg II	24	(17)
2023–2025	SV Sandhausen	47	(7)
2025–	Bayern Munich II	13	(1)
2026	→ SpVgg Unterhaching (loan)	11	(1)
2026–	→ SV Meppen (loan)	9	(0)
2026–	→ SV Meppen II (loan)	1	(1)
- * Club domestic league appearances and goals as of 30 October 2026

Richard Christian Meier (born 11 February 2004) is a German professional footballer who plays as a striker and winger for 3. Liga club SV Meppen, on loan from Bayern Munich II.

== Club career ==
Meier is a youth product of Burger BC 08 and 1. FC Magdeburg, having made his professional debut with the latter's reserve team in 2022, during the 2022–23 Verbandsliga Sachsen-Anhalt season.

On 4 July 2023, he joined 3. Liga club SV Sandhausen. After SV Sandhausen were relegated to the Regionalliga Südwest, Meier moved to Bayern Munich's reserve team ahead of the 2025–26 season, signing a contract until 2028.

On 1 February 2026, he joined Regionalliga Bayern club SpVgg Unterhaching, on a six-month loan for the rest of the season.

On 9 July 2026, Meier joined 3. Liga club SV Meppen, on loan for the 2026–27 season.

== Career statistics ==
=== Club ===
As of 10 October 2026

Appearances and goals by club, season and competition
Club	Season	League			DFB-Pokal		Other (Note: Includes Badenpokal)		Total	
Club	Season	Division	Apps	Goals	Apps	Goals	Apps	Goals	Apps	Goals
1. FC Magdeburg II	2022–23	Verbandsliga Sachsen-Anhalt	24	17	—		—		24	17
1. FC Magdeburg II	Total		24	17	—		—		24	17
SV Sandhausen	2023–24	3. Liga	31	5	1	0	4	2	36	7
SV Sandhausen	2024–25	3. Liga	16	2	1	1	3	1	20	4
SV Sandhausen	Total		47	7	2	1	7	3	56	11
Bayern Munich II	2025–26	Regionalliga Bayern	13	1	—		—		13	1
Bayern Munich II	Total		13	1	—		—		13	1
SpVgg Unterhaching (loan)	2025–26	Regionalliga Bayern	11	1	—		—		11	1
SpVgg Unterhaching (loan)	Total		11	1	—		—		11	1
SV Meppen (loan)	2026–27	3. Liga	8	0	—		0	0	8	0
SV Meppen (loan)	Total		8	0	—		0	0	8	0
Career total			107	26	2	1	7	3	112	30
