= Julien Yanda =

German footballer (born 2007)

Personal information
- Full name: Julien Gerd-Joachim Yanda
- Date of birth: 22 August 2007 (age 19)
- Place of birth: Hamburg, Germany
- Height: 1.83 m (6 ft 0 in)
- Positions: Left-back; left wing-back; left winger

Team information
- Current team: Eldense (on loan from Bayern Munich II)
- Number: 22

Youth career
- HSV Barmbek-Uhlenhorst
- 2017–2025: FC St. Pauli

Senior career*
Years	Team	Apps	(Gls)
2024–2025	FC St. Pauli II	0	(0)
2024–2025	FC St. Pauli	0	(0)
2025–	Bayern Munich II	40	(3)
2026–	→ Eldense (loan)	0	(0)
- * Club domestic league appearances and goals as of 16 May 2026

Julien Gerd-Joachim Yanda (born 22 August 2007) is a German professional footballer who plays as a left-back, left wing-back and left winger for Segunda División club Eldense, on loan from Regionalliga Bayern club Bayern Munich II.

== Club career ==
=== FC St. Pauli ===
Yanda is a native of Hamburg, Germany, as a youth player he started his career with the youth academy of HSV Barmbek-Uhlenhorst, and later joined the youth academy of FC St. Pauli in 2017.

He received his first call-up with FC St. Pauli II on 25 October 2024, for a 1–0 away loss Regionalliga Nord match against SV Drochtersen/Assel, as an unused substitute however. One month later, Yanda was called up with FC St. Pauli on 24 November, for a 2–0 away loss Bundesliga match against Borussia Mönchengladbach, once again not coming off the bench.

=== Bayern Munich ===
On 27 January 2025, he transferred to the reserve team of Bundesliga giants Bayern Munich, and was called up to train with the first team by head coach Vincent Kompany, along with Cassiano Kiala, Magnus Dalpiaz and Roko Mijatović. Yanda made his professional debut some months later on 8 March, starting for Bayern Munich II during a 3–0 away loss Regionalliga Bayern match against DJK Vilzing. He scored his first professional goal on 9 May 2025, during a 5–0 home win Regionalliga Bayern match against Türkgücü München.

In April 2026, clubs from Spanish La Liga and Italian Serie A, showed interest in recruiting him.

==== Loan to Eldense ====
On 17 July 2026, Yanda joined Spanish Segunda División club Eldense, on a one-year loan for the 2026–27 season. He made his debut with the club on 29 October 2026, as a starter during a 1–0 away win Copa del Rey first round match against Atlético Baleares.

== Personal life ==
Born in Germany, Yanda is of Gabonese descent.

== Career statistics ==
As of match played 29 October 2026

Appearances and goals by club, season and competition
Club	Season	League			Cup (Note: Includes Copa del Rey)		Continental		Total	
Club	Season	Division	Apps	Goals	Apps	Goals	Apps	Goals	Apps	Goals
FC St. Pauli II	2024–25	Regionalliga Nord	0	0	—		—		0	0
FC St. Pauli II	Total		0	0	—		—		0	0
FC St. Pauli	2024–25	Bundesliga	0	0	—		—		0	0
FC St. Pauli	Total		0	0	—		—		0	0
Bayern Munich II	2024–25	Regionalliga Bayern	11	1	—		—		11	1
Bayern Munich II	2025–26	Regionalliga Bayern	29	2	—		—		29	2
Bayern Munich II	Total		40	3	—		—		40	3
Eldense (loan)	2026–27	Segunda División	0	0	1	0	—		1	0
Eldense (loan)	Total		0	0	1	0	—		1	0
Career Total			40	3	1	0	0	0	41	3
