= Aleksandar Pavlović (footballer) =

German footballer (born 2004)

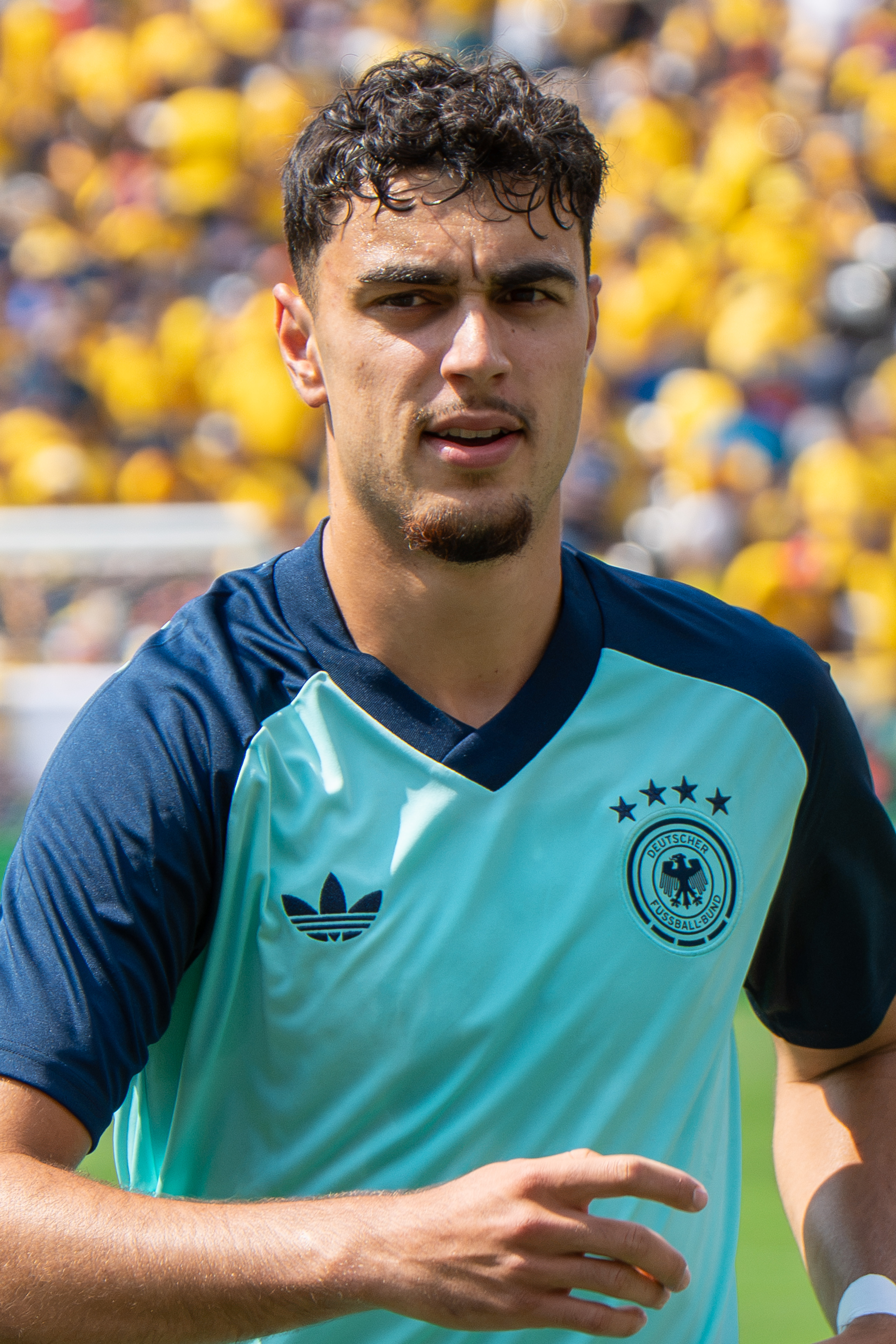
- Pavlović with Germany in 2026

Personal information
- Full name: Aleksandar Pavlović
- Date of birth: 3 May 2004 (age 22)
- Place of birth: Munich, Germany
- Height: 1.88 m (6 ft 2 in)
- Position: Defensive midfielder

Team information
- Current team: Bayern Munich
- Number: 45

Youth career
- 2010–2011: SC Fürstenfeldbruck
- 2011–2023: Bayern Munich

Senior career*
Years	Team	Apps	(Gls)
2023–2024	Bayern Munich II	9	(0)
2023–	Bayern Munich	73	(8)

International career^{‡}
2023	Germany U20	2	(0)
2024–	Germany	19	(1)
- * Club domestic league appearances and goals as of 21:25, 20 November 2026 (UTC) ‡ National team caps and goals as of 21:43, 16 November 2026 (UTC)

Aleksandar Pavlović (Serbian Cyrillic: Александар Павловић; born 3 May 2004) is a German professional footballer who plays as a defensive midfielder for Bundesliga club Bayern Munich and the Germany national team.

== Club career ==
=== Youth career ===
Pavlović was an academy of Bayern Munich youth product. He joined Bayern Munich in 2011 when he was seven years old from SC Fürstenfeldbruck. On 23 July 2021, Pavlović extended his contract until 2022. On 3 May 2022, he signed a contract with Bayern Munich until 2024. That same month, he started training with the senior squad of Bayern Munich for the first time, subsequently appearing on the bench for a pair of Bundesliga matches.

=== Senior career ===
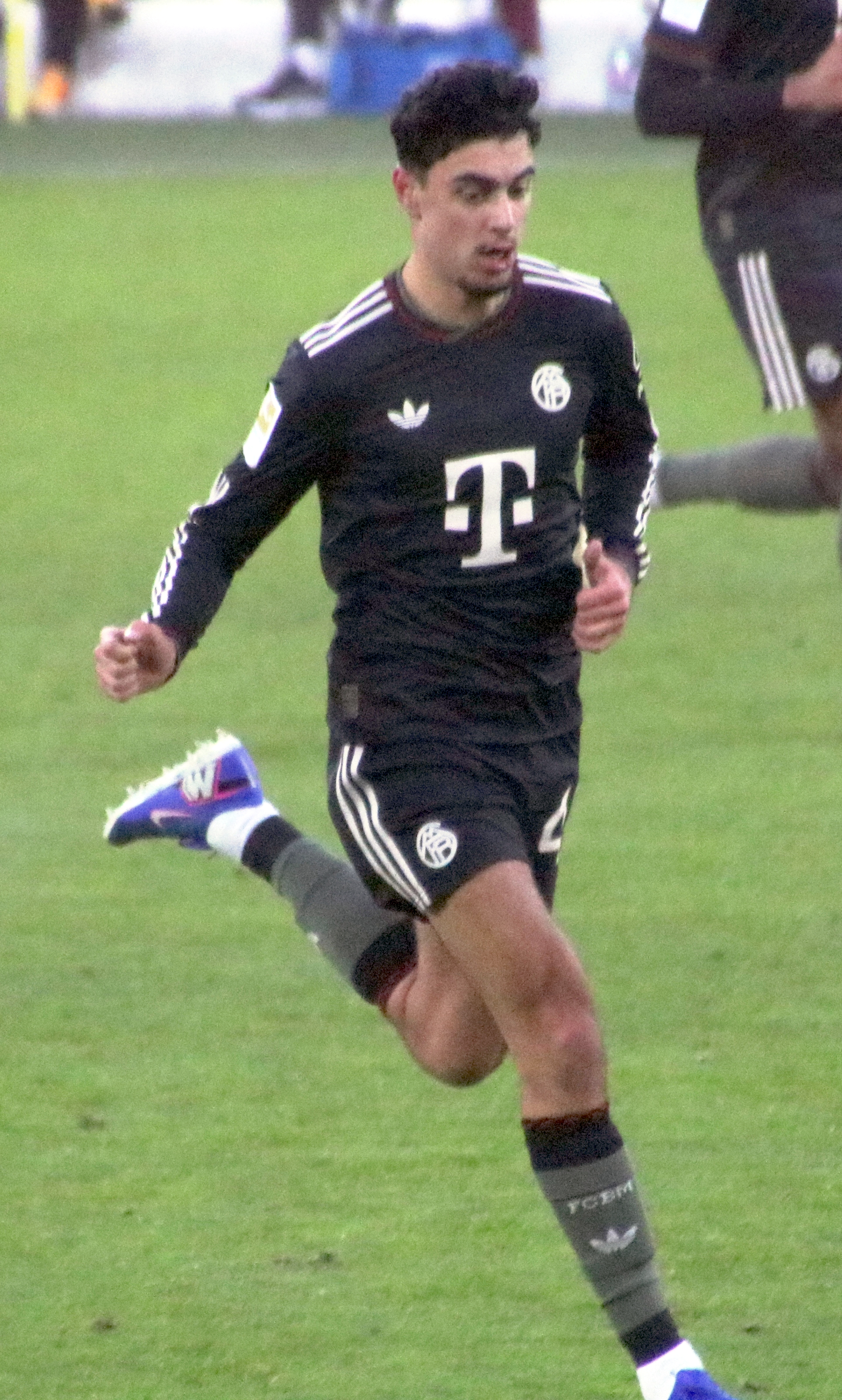
Pavlović playing for Bayern Munich in 2026

Pavlović played for the senior Bayern Munich team in the summer of 2023, during the 2023–24 preseason. He made his Bundesliga debut as a substitute in an 8–0 victory against Darmstadt 98 on 28 October 2023. On 1 November, he signed a professional contract with Bayern Munich until 2027. On 4 November, he provided his first assist in Bundesliga to the third goal scored by Harry Kane in a 4–0 away victory against Borussia Dortmund. One week later, Pavlović made his first start in a 4–2 victory against 1. FC Heidenheim. On 29 November, he made his UEFA Champions League debut, coming off the bench in the 64th minute in a goalless draw against Copenhagen. On 27 January 2024, he scored his first goal in a Bundesliga 3–2 away victory against Augsburg. Later that year, on 16 June, Pavlović extended his contract until 2029.

In the 2024–25 season, Pavlović achieved his first Bundesliga title with the club. On 15 April 2026, he scored his first Champions League goal in a 4–3 win over Real Madrid in the quarter-finals.

== International career ==
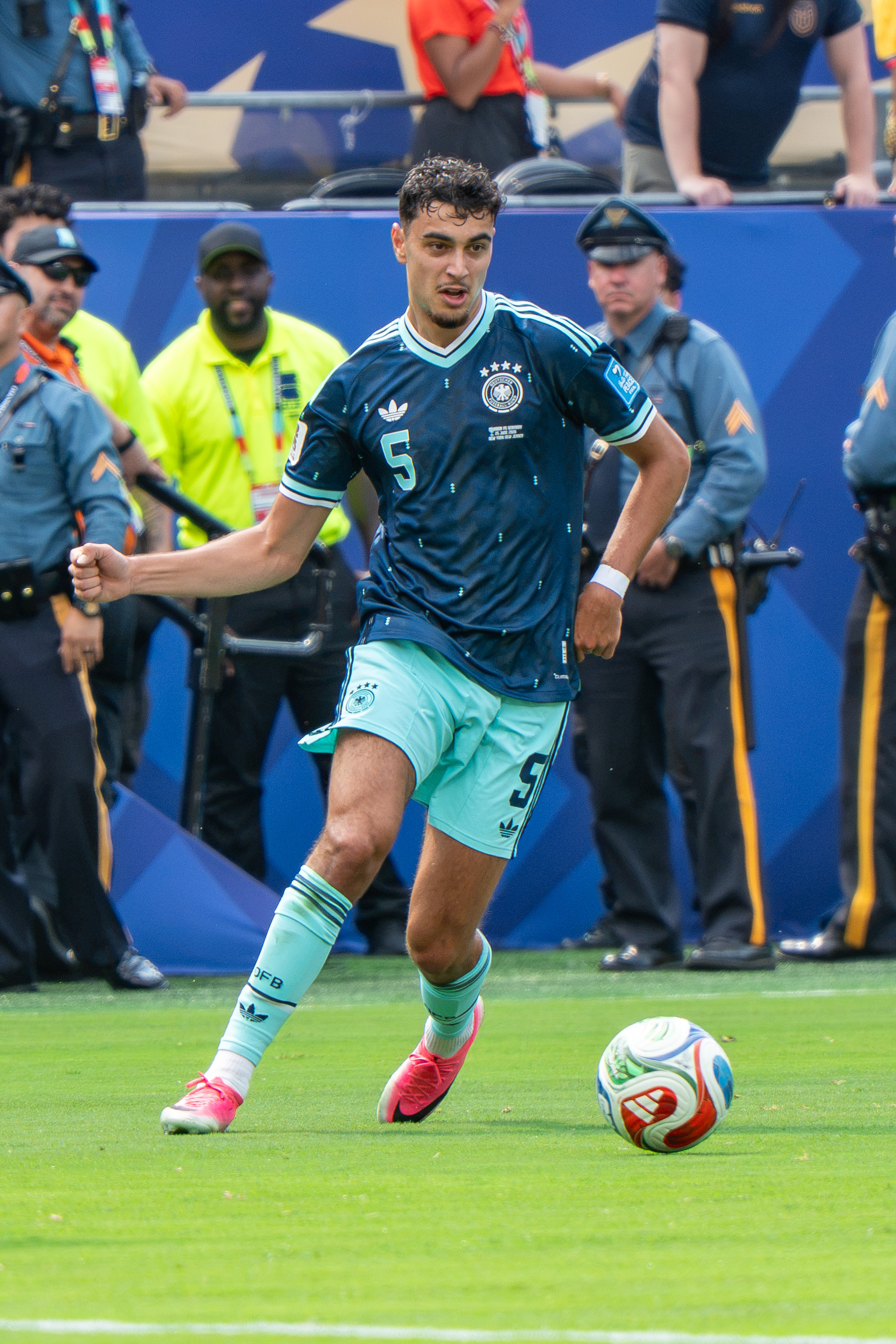
Pavlović on the ball for Germany at the 2026 FIFA World Cup

Born in Germany to a Serbian father and a German mother, Pavlović holds dual citizenship. In September 2021, he was called up to the Serbia U18 for a set of friendly matches. In November 2023, Pavlović was called up to the Germany national under-20 football team.

On 14 March 2024, Pavlović was called up for the German senior squad by head coach Julian Nagelsmann for the friendly matches against France and the Netherlands. However, he missed both fixtures due to suffering from tonsillitis.

Pavlović was selected in the German preliminary squad for the UEFA Euro 2024. He made his senior debut on 3 June in a friendly match against Ukraine prior to the tournament. Pavlović was confirmed in Germany's final 26-man squad, but had to withdraw due to an illness. On 7 September 2024, he scored his first goal for Germany in a 5–0 victory against Hungary during the UEFA Nations League.

On 21 May 2026, Pavlović was selected in Germany’s 26-man squad for the 2026 FIFA World Cup.

== Career statistics ==
=== Club ===
As of match played 20 November 2026

Appearances and goals by club, season and competitions
Club	Season	League			DFB-Pokal		Europe		Other		Total	
Club	Season	Division	Apps	Goals	Apps	Goals	Apps	Goals	Apps	Goals	Apps	Goals
Bayern Munich II	2022–23	Regionalliga Bayern	6	0	—		—		—		6	0
Bayern Munich II	2023–24	Regionalliga Bayern	3	0	—		—		—		3	0
Bayern Munich II	Total		9	0	—		—		—		9	0
Bayern Munich	2023–24	Bundesliga	19	2	0	0	3 (Note: Appearances in UEFA Champions League)	0	—		22	2
Bayern Munich	2024–25	Bundesliga	21	1	2	0	5	0	5 (Note: Appearances in FIFA Club World Cup)	0	33	1
Bayern Munich	2025–26	Bundesliga	24	3	6	0	14	1	0	0	44	4
Bayern Munich	2026–27	Bundesliga	9	2	2	0	2	0	1 (Note: Appearance in Franz Beckenbauer Supercup)	0	14	2
Bayern Munich	Total		73	8	10	0	24	1	6	0	113	9
Career total			82	8	10	0	24	1	6	0	122	9

=== International ===
As of match played 16 November 2026

Appearances and goals by national team and year
National team	Year	Apps	Goals
Germany	2024	4	1
Germany	2025	5	0
Germany	2026	10	0
Total		19	1

As of match played 14 June 2026
Scores and results list Germany's goal tally first.

List of international goals scored by Aleksandar Pavlović
No.	Date	Venue	Cap	Opponent	Score	Result	Competition
1	7 September 2024	Merkur Spiel-Arena, Düsseldorf, Germany	2	Hungary	4–0	5–0	2024–25 UEFA Nations League A

== Honours ==
Bayern Munich

- Bundesliga: 2024–25, 2025–26
- DFB-Pokal: 2025–26
- Franz Beckenbauer Supercup: 2025, 2026

Individual

- Bundesliga Goal of the Month: September 2024
- Bundesliga Team of the Season: 2025–26
