= 2026 Franz Beckenbauer Supercup =

German Supercup
- Event: Franz Beckenbauer Supercup
Borussia Dortmund	Bayern Munich
1	2
- Date: 22 August 2026
- Venue: Signal Iduna Park, Dortmund
- Man of the Match: Michael Olise (Bayern Munich)
- Referee: Daniel Schlager (Bietigheim)
- Attendance: 81,365

The 2026 Franz Beckenbauer Supercup was the 17th edition of the German super cup organised by the DFL, known as the Franz Beckenbauer Supercup, an annual football match contested by the winners of the previous season's Bundesliga and DFB-Pokal competitions. The match was played on 22 August 2026.

The match featured Borussia Dortmund, the runners-up of the 2025–26 Bundesliga, and Bayern Munich, the winners of the 2025–26 Bundesliga and the 2025–26 DFB-Pokal. The match was hosted by Borussia Dortmund at the Signal Iduna Park in Dortmund.

Bayern Munich won the match 2–1 for their 12th Supercup title.

== Teams ==
In the following table, matches until 1996 were in the DFB-Supercup era, from 2010 to 2024 were in the DFL-Supercup era, and since 2025 were in the Franz Beckenbauer Supercup era.

Team	Qualification	Previous appearances (bold indicates winners)
Borussia Dortmund	2025–26 Bundesliga runners-up	12 (**1989**, **1995**, **1996**, 2011, 2012, **2013**, **2014**, 2016, 2017, **2019**, 2020, 2021)
Bayern Munich^{TH}	2025–26 Bundesliga champions and 2025–26 DFB-Pokal winners	18 (**1987**, 1989, **1990**, 1994, **2010**, **2012**, 2013, 2014, 2015, **2016**, **2017**, **2018**, 2019, **2020**, **2021**, **2022**, 2023, **2025**)

== Match ==
=== Details ===
22 August 2026
20:30 CEST

Borussia Dortmund	1–2	Bayern Munich
Silva 75'	Report	Brown 28'; Olise 45+1'

Signal Iduna Park, Dortmund
Attendance: 81,365
Referee: Daniel Schlager (Bietigheim)

**Borussia Dortmund**	**Bayern Munich**

GK	1	(Switzerland) Gregor Kobel
CB	22	(France) Joane Gadou
CB	3	(Germany) Waldemar Anton (c)
CB	5	(Algeria) Ramy Bensebaini	(red card) 90'
RM	24	(Sweden) Daniel Svensson
CM	7	(England) Jobe Bellingham
CM	8	(Germany) Felix Nmecha		(substituted off) 63'
LM	26	(Norway) Julian Ryerson		(substituted off) 73'
RW	19	(Greece) Konstantinos Karetsas		(substituted off) 62'
LW	40	(Italy) Samuele Inácio		(substituted off) 46'
CF	9	(Guinea) Serhou Guirassy		(substituted off) 63'
Substitutes:
GK	33	(Germany) Alexander Meyer
DF	39	(Italy) Filippo Mane
DF	49	(Italy) Luca Reggiani
MF	20	(Austria) Marcel Sabitzer		(substituted on) 73'
MF	25	(Netherlands) Joey Veerman		(substituted on) 63'
MF	45	(Greece) Giannis Konstantelias		(substituted on) 46'
FW	14	(Germany) Maximilian Beier		(substituted on) 62'
FW	21	(Portugal) Fábio Silva		(substituted on) 63'
FW	41	(United States) Mathis Albert
Manager:
(Croatia) Niko Kovač

GK	1	(Germany) Manuel Neuer (c)
RB	27	(Austria) Konrad Laimer
CB	4	(Germany) Jonathan Tah
CB	3	(South Korea) Kim Min-jae
LB	44	(Croatia) Josip Stanišić		(substituted off) 68'
CM	6	(Germany) Joshua Kimmich
CM	45	(Germany) Aleksandar Pavlović
RW	17	(France) Michael Olise
AM	11	(Germany) Nathaniel Brown		(substituted off) 81'
LW	14	(Colombia) Luis Díaz	(yellow card) 45+1'	(substituted off) 90+5'
CF	9	(England) Harry Kane
Substitutes:
GK	40	(Germany) Jonas Urbig
DF	2	(France) Dayot Upamecano
DF	19	(Canada) Alphonso Davies		(substituted on) 68'
DF	21	(Japan) Hiroki Itō
MF	8	(Germany) Tom Bischof		(substituted on) 90+5'
MF	22	(Germany) Arijon Ibrahimović
MF	34	(Morocco) Ismael Saibari		(substituted on) 81'
MF	39	(Senegal) Bara Sapoko Ndiaye
FW	49	(Brazil) Maycon Cardozo
Manager:
(Belgium) Vincent Kompany

Man of the Match:
Michael Olise (Bayern Munich)

Assistant referees:
Sven Waschitzki-Günther (Bremen)
Tobias Fritsch (Hahnheim)
Fourth official:
Timo Gerach (Landau)
Video assistant referee:
Johann Pfeifer (Hamelin)
Assistant video assistant referee:
Markus Sinn (Filderstadt)

**Match rules**

- 90 minutes
- Penalty shoot-out if scores level
- Maximum of nine named substitutes
- Maximum of five substitutions
- Maximum of three substitution opportunities

== See also ==
- 2025–26 Bundesliga
- 2025–26 DFB-Pokal
