= Leonard Prescott =

German footballer (born 2009)

Personal information
- Date of birth: 23 September 2009 (age 17)
- Place of birth: New York City, United States
- Height: 1.96 m (6 ft 5 in)
- Position: Goalkeeper

Team information
- Current team: Bayern Munich II

Youth career
- –2023: Union Berlin
- 2023–: Bayern Munich

Senior career*
Years	Team	Apps	(Gls)
2026–	Bayern Munich	0	(0)
2026–	Bayern Munich II	0	(0)

International career^{‡}
2024–	Germany U16	3	(0)
2025–	Germany U17	9	(0)
- * Club domestic league appearances and goals as of 21 March 2026 ‡ National team caps and goals as of 31 March 2026

Leonard Prescott (born 23 September 2009) is a footballer who plays as a goalkeeper for Regionalliga Bayern club Bayern Munich II. Born in the United States, he is a German youth international.

== Club career ==
=== Bayern Munich ===
Prescott is a youth product of Union Berlin. In 2023 he joined the youth academy of Bundesliga side Bayern Munich with whom he progressed and continued his development.

He was called up by the Bayern Munich's senior team head coach Vincent Kompany for the 5–0 win friendly match against Austrian Bundesliga club Red Bull Salzburg on 6 January 2026, as an unused substitute however.

Prescott was one of the 21 players who were called-up for the UEFA Champions League round of 16 match against Italian Serie A club Atalanta on 10 March 2026. He was an unused substitute however, during the 6–1 away win for Bayern Munich. Four days later, Prescott received his first Bundesliga call-up during a 1–1 draw away against Bayer Leverkusen, as an unused substitute.

== International career ==
Prescott was born in New York City, United States, to an African-American father and German mother, and holds dual German and American citizenship. He has represented Germany at the under-16 and under-17 levels since 2024.

== Career statistics ==
As of match played 21 March 2026

Appearances and goals by club, season and competition
Club	Season	League			Cup		Continental		Total	
Club	Season	Division	Apps	Goals	Apps	Goals	Apps	Goals	Apps	Goals
Bayern Munich	2025–26	Bundesliga	0	0	0	0	0	0	0	0
Career Total			0	0	0	0	0	0	0	0
