= Cassiano Kiala =

German footballer (born 2009)

Personal information
- Full name: Cassiano Tomas Kiala
- Date of birth: 11 January 2009 (age 17)
- Place of birth: Berlin, Germany
- Height: 1.86 m (6 ft 1 in)
- Position: Defender

Team information
- Current team: Bayern Munich
- Number: 30

Youth career
- –2024: Hertha BSC
- 2024–: Bayern Munich

Senior career*
Years	Team	Apps	(Gls)
2025–	Bayern Munich	1	(0)
2025–	Bayern Munich II	11	(0)

International career^{‡}
2024	Germany U15	1	(0)
2024–2025	Germany U16	11	(0)
2025–	Germany U17	6	(0)
2026–	Germany U19	5	(0)
- * Club domestic league appearances and goals as of 23:45, 7 November 2026 (UTC) ‡ National team caps and goals as of 17 November 2026

Cassiano Tomas Kiala (born 11 January 2009) is a German professional footballer who plays as a defender for Bundesliga club Bayern Munich. He is a German youth international.

== Early life ==
Kiala was born on 11 January 2009 in Berlin, Germany. He is of Angolan descent through his parents.

== Club career ==
=== Bayern Munich ===
As a youth player, Kiala joined the youth academy of Hertha BSC. Following his stint there, he joined the youth academy of Bundesliga side Bayern Munich during the summer of 2024.

On 11 June 2025, Bayern Munich announced their 32-player final squad for the FIFA Club World Cup, which included Kiala.

He was one of the players that were called up by Bayern Munich head coach Vincent Kompany, for the 2025 pre-season matches against French Ligue 1 club Lyon, English Premier League club Tottenham Hotspur, and Swiss Super League club Grasshopper, on 2, 7, and 12 August 2025, respectively.

Kiala made his professional debut with Bayern Munich II on 23 August 2025, starting for a 2–2 home draw Regionalliga Bayern match against SpVgg Bayreuth.

Kiala received his first call-up with the Bayern Munich senior team for the first UEFA Champions League league phase match against English Premier League club Chelsea on 17 September 2025, which Bayern Munich won 3–1 at home, however Kiala was an unused substitute. He made his debut with the Bayern Munich senior team on December 21, substituting Dayot Upamecano at the second half of a 4–0 away win Bundesliga match against 1. FC Heidenheim, simultaneously becoming the second youngest debutant for Bayern Munich at 16 years and 344 days old, behind only Paul Wanner who debuted with the club being 16 years and 15 days old in 2022.

Kiala was called up as a starter for the 5–0 win friendly match against Austrian Bundesliga club Red Bull Salzburg on 6 January 2026.

On 20 August 2026, he signed a long-term contract extension with Bayern Munich, the duration of which was not disclosed.

Kiala was called-up with the senior team during the 2026–27 season on 25 October 2026, for the 3–1 away win Bundesliga match against SC Freiburg, as an unused substitute however.

== International career ==
Kiala is a Germany youth international. Eligible to represent Angola internationally through his parents, he captained the Germany national under-16 team.

== Career statistics ==
As of match played 7 November 2026

Appearances and goals by club, season and competition
Club	Season	League			DFB-Pokal		Europe		Other		Total	
Club	Season	Division	Apps	Goals	Apps	Goals	Apps	Goals	Apps	Goals	Apps	Goals
Bayern Munich	2024–25	Bundesliga	—		—		—		0	0	0	0
Bayern Munich	2025–26	Bundesliga	1	0	0	0	0	0	0	0	1	0
Bayern Munich	2026–27	Bundesliga	0	0	0	0	0	0	0	0	0	0
Bayern Munich	Total		1	0	0	0	0	0	0	0	1	0
Bayern Munich II	2025–26	Regionalliga Bayern	2	0	—		—		—		2	0
Bayern Munich II	2026–27	Regionalliga Bayern	9	0	—		—		—		9	0
Bayern Munich II	Total		11	0	—		—		0	0	11	0
Career total			12	0	0	0	0	0	0	0	12	0

== Honours ==
Individual

- Fritz Walter Medal: U17 Silver Medal 2026

== Style of play ==
Kiala mainly plays as a centre-back and is right-footed. German newspaper Kreiszeitung wrote in 2025 that he "has impressed with... his speed, and his technical proficiency".
