= Michael Scott (footballer, born 2006) =

German footballer (born 2006)

Personal information
- Full name: Michael Gatlin Owusu Scott
- Date of birth: 2 February 2006 (age 20)
- Place of birth: Cologne, Germany
- Positions: Winger; wing-back; wide midfielder; full-back

Team information
- Current team: Bayern Munich II

Youth career
- 2015–2021: Bayer Leverkusen
- 2021–2025: Bayern Munich

Senior career*
Years	Team	Apps	(Gls)
2024–	Bayern Munich II	34	(1)

International career^{‡}
2022	Germany U17	2	(0)
2023	Germany U18	1	(0)
- * Club domestic league appearances and goals as of 11 September 2026 ‡ National team caps and goals as of 14 October 2025

Michael Gatlin Owusu Scott (born 2 February 2006) is a German professional footballer who plays as a winger, wing-back, wide midfielder and full-back for Regionalliga Bayern club Bayern Munich II. He is a former German youth international.

== Club career ==
Scott is a youth product of Bayer 04 Leverkusen, having moved to the youth academy of Bayern Munich in 2021.

In February 2024 he extended his contract with Bayern Munich until June 2027.

On 13 August 2024, Scott was called-up with the Bayern Munich senior team as an unused substitute for their last friendly match of the 2024–25 pre-season, a 3–0 win against Austrian Bundesliga club WSG Tirol.

He was called-up with the Bayern Munich senior team for a friendly match after the 2024 winter break concluded, on 6 January 2025, in which he substituted Konrad Laimer at the 63rd minute of a 6–0 win over Austrian Bundesliga club Red Bull Salzburg.

Scott made his professional debut with Bayern Munich II on 26 July 2024, as a starter during a 2–2 home draw Regionalliga Bayern match against SpVgg Ansbach. Scott scored his first professional goal on 29 October 2024, during a 4–0 home win Regionalliga Bayern match against Greuther Fürth II.

== International career ==
Scott has represented Germany at the under-17 and under-18 levels.

== Career statistics ==
As of match played 11 September 2026

Appearances and goals by club, season and competition
Club	Season	League			Cup		Total			
Club	Season	Division	Apps	Goals	Apps	Goals	Apps	Goals		
Bayern Munich II	2024–25	Regionalliga Bayern	14	1	—		14	1		
Bayern Munich II	2025–26	Regionalliga Bayern	16	0	—		16	0		
Bayern Munich II	2026–27	Regionalliga Bayern	4	0	—		—		4	0
Bayern Munich II	Total		34	1	—		34	1		
Career Total			34	1	0	0	34	1		

== Personal life ==
Born in Cologne Germany, Scott is of Ghanaian descent, his older brother Christopher plays as an attacking midfielder for Belgian Pro League club Antwerp, having progressed through the Bayern Munich youth ranks as well.
