= FC Bayern Munich II =

German reserve football team

Bayern Munich II
- Full name: FC Bayern München II
- Nicknames: "Bayern Amateure" (Bayern Non-professionals), "Kleine Bayern" (Little Bayern)
- Founded: 1900; 126 years ago as Bayern Amateure
- Stadium: Grünwalder Stadion
- Capacity: 15,000
- President: Herbert Hainer
- Head coach: Dante
- League: Regionalliga Bayern (IV)
- 2025–26: Regionalliga Bayern, 8th of 18
Home colours	Away colours	Third colours

FC Bayern Munich II (FC Bayern Munich Amateure until 2005) are the reserve team of German association football club Bayern Munich, currently playing in the Regionalliga Bayern. In 2010–11, they played in the 3. Liga, having qualified for its inaugural season in 2008, and have consistently played at the third level of German football (the highest permissible level for reserve teams) – they played in the Regionalliga Süd from its formation in 1994 to 2008, when it was usurped by the 3. Liga. They have generally achieved at least mid-table finishes at this level, and won the Regionalliga Süd title in 2004. In 2010–11, Bayern II finished last in the 3. Liga, and were thus relegated to the Regionalliga. They afterwards regained promotion by winning the 2018–19 Regionalliga and won the 3. Liga in 2019–20. The following season, they were relegated from the 3. Liga after an 18th-place finish.

== Overview ==
The team is intended to be the final step between Bayern's youth setup and the first team, and is usually made up of promising youngsters between the age of 18 and 23, with a few veteran players drafted in to provide experience.

Bayern II has made several appearances in the DFB-Pokal, even facing the senior Bayern side in a fourth round tie in 1977 losing 5–3.

== History ==
The team's first appearance in the top-league of Bavarian football, the southern group of the Amateurliga Bayern, came in 1956, when it won the tier-four 2nd Amateurliga Oberbayern A and advanced to the next level through the promotion round. After finishing its first season in this league in mid-table, it ended 1957–58 as runners-up, two points behind local rival Wacker München. It repeated this achievement in 1960–61, this time coming second to 1860 Munich II. Both reserve sides then descended in the league table and, in 1963, when the German football league system was severely altered, they both missed the cut-off for the new single-tier Amateurliga Bayern. Bayern Amateure had to finish seventh to qualify but came only 14th and found itself grouped in the new tier-four Landesliga Bayern-Süd.

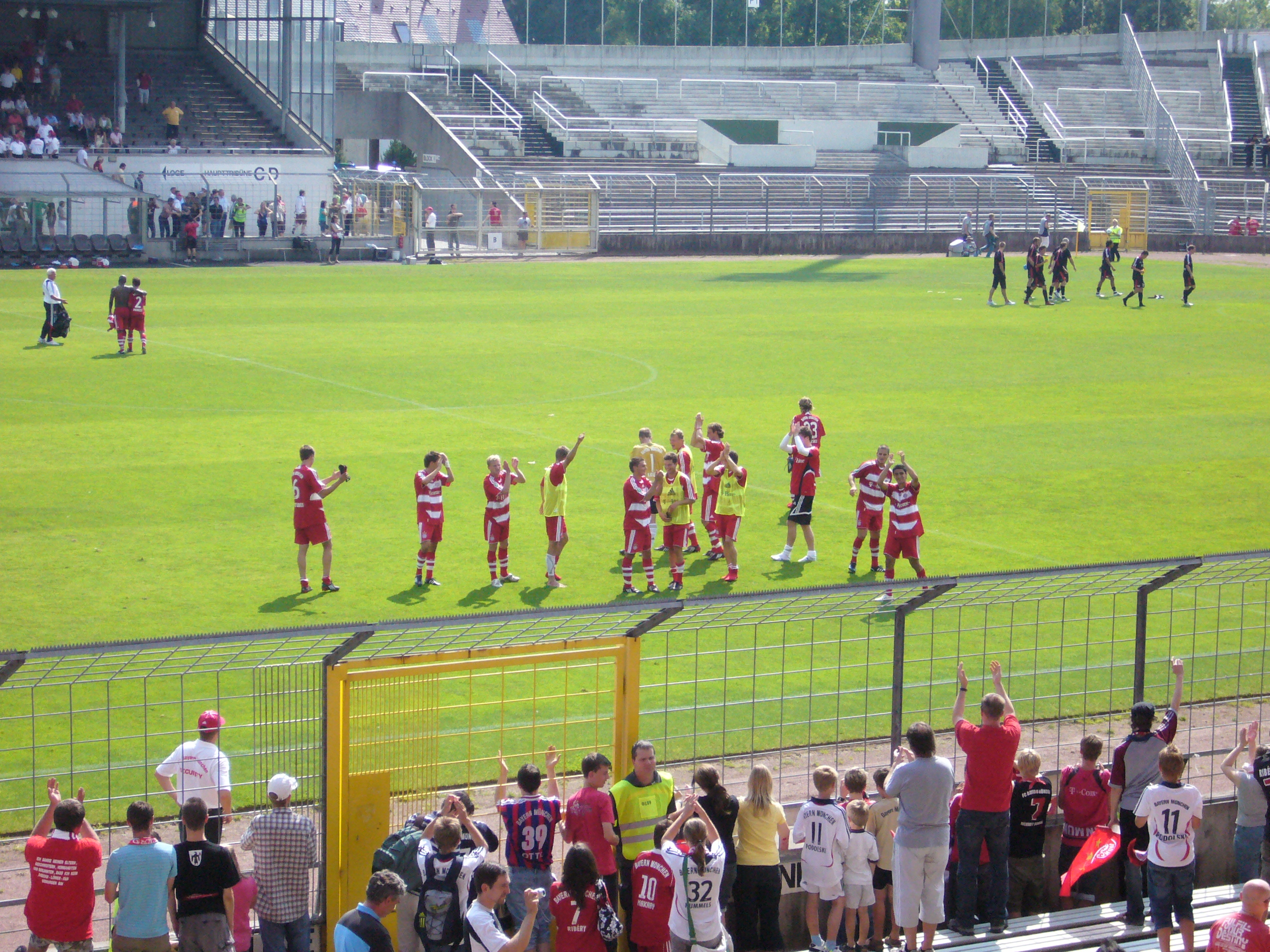
Bayern Munich II celebrate a victory at the Grünwalder Stadion in 2008

It took the team four seasons in this league to work its way back up, improving year by year and, in 1966–67, it finished first and earned promotion back to the Bayernliga. Bayern started well in the league, coming fourth in the first year, but then declined and was relegated again in 1971. It only took two seasons this time for the team to return to the third division and another league win in 1973 moved the team back up.

For the next 21 seasons, the team was to be a member of the Bayernliga without interruption. However, in all the 21 seasons there, the team could never win the league either, being ineligible for promotion from there to professional football anyway.

The team had few bad seasons in this time, coming relatively close to relegation only once, in 1982. It managed three runners-up finishes in the league, in 1983, 1984 and 1987 and generally existed as an upper-table side.

In 1994, with the introduction of the new tier-three Regionalliga Süd, the team qualified comfortably. It was to be a long-term member of this league, too, belonging to it until 2008, when the 3. Liga was formed. After mostly finishing in mid-table in the league, Bayern earned its first league title in over 30 years when it won the Regionalliga in 2004. Being already a member of the highest league in which reserve teams are permitted, the side could not take up promotion to the 2nd Bundesliga and had to stay at this level. In 2005, all reserve sides of clubs in the first and second Bundesliga changed their name from Amateure to II, meaning FC Bayern Munich Amateure became FC Bayern Munich II.

In 2008, the team earned promotion to the new 3. Liga, finishing eighth when a top-ten finish was needed. The club played at this level for three seasons before suffering relegation to the Regionalliga in 2010–11. It was the first time since 1973 that the team would not play in the third division and also meant the end of Hermann Gerland as the team's coach.

After coming second in the inaugural Regionalliga Bayern season in 2012–13, the team won the league the following year. This entitled the club to enter the promotion round to the 3. Liga. After two games against Regionalliga West champions Fortuna Köln, they lost due to the away goal rule, making their opponents one of the three promoted teams to the third division.

In 2019, Bayern Munich II earned promotion to the 3. Liga, after winning Regionalliga 2018–2019 and defeating Wolfsburg II in the two-game promotion-playoff (1–3 and 4–1). The following season, while placing 15th after the first half of the season, Bayern Munich II won the 3. Liga. However, since secondary teams aren't eligible for promotion to 2.Bundesliga, Bayern Munich II remained in 3. Liga for the 2020–21 season. Bayern II failed to defend their 3. Liga title in the 2020-21 season, finishing 18th, and were relegated to the Regionalliga Bayern.

== Stadium ==
Bayern II play at the Grünwalder Stadion, which was the first team's venue until the opening of the Olympiastadion in 1972. During the 2012–13 season Bayern II moved to Sportpark Heimstetten, the home stadium of SV Heimstetten, caused by renovation of the Grünwalder Stadion.

== Kit suppliers and shirt sponsors ==
Period	Kit manufacturer	Shirt sponsor (chest)	Shirt sponsor (sleeve)
1964–1971	Palme Trikotfabrik		
1971–1974	Erima		
1974–1978	Adidas	Adidas	
1978–1981	Adidas	Magirus Deutz	
1981–1984	Adidas	Iveco Magirus	
1984–1989	Adidas	Commodore	
1989–2002	Adidas	Opel	
2002–2017	Adidas	Deutsche Telekom	
2017–2018	Adidas	Deutsche Telekom	Hamad Airport
2018–present	Adidas	Deutsche Telekom	Qatar Airways

== Players ==
=== Squad ===
The team currently competes in the Regionalliga Bayern. Dante has been the head coach (as well as for the U19 squad in the UEFA Youth League) since July 2026. The following players have been assigned and or officially featured with Bayern Munich II. All players are eligible for the senior squad, while some players remain eligible for the academy squads also. Players in bold are those who have been called-up and/or featured with the senior squad.

As of 1 September 2026

Note: Flags indicate national team as defined under FIFA eligibility rules; some limited exceptions apply. Players may hold more than one non-FIFA nationality.

No.	Pos.	Nation	Player
—	GK	GER	**Jannis Bärtl**
—	GK	GER	**Leon Klanac**
—	GK	GER	**Leonard Prescott**
—	GK	GER	Leonard Ruland
—	DF	GER	Tarek Buchmann
—	DF	AUT	David Heindl
—	DF	GER	Maximilian Hennig
—	DF	GER	**Cassiano Kiala**
—	DF	KOR	Kim Do-yeon
—	DF	GER	**Vincent Manuba**
—	DF	CRO	Roko Mijatović
—	DF	CRO	**Filip Pavić**
—	DF	GER	Raphael Pavlić
—	DF	NED	Chivano Wijks
—	DF	GER	Benedikt Wimmer
—	MF	GER	Artur Degraf
—	MF	ITA	**Guido Della Rovere**
—	MF	GER	Yll Gashi

No.	Pos.	Nation	Player
—	MF	GER	Allen Junior Lambé
—	MF	UKR	Bohdan Olychenko
—	MF	GER	Louis Richter
—	MF	POR	**David Santos Daiber**
—	MF	GER	Mudaser Sadat
—	MF	GER	Benno Schmitz
—	MF	CZE	Matouš Srb
—	FW	ALG	Younes Aitamer
—	FW	GER	**Bastian Assomo**
—	FW	GER	**Tim Binder**
—	FW	BRA	**Maycon Cardozo**
—	FW	FRA	**Noah Codjo-Evora**
—	FW	USA	Bajung Darboe
—	FW	GER	Jason Eckl
—	FW	GER	Anton Heinz
—	FW	GER	Michael Scott
—	FW	GER	Oluwaseyi Wilson

=== Bayern Munich Junior Team/Campus ===
As of 7 November 2026

The following players have been called-up to Bayern Munich II squad for an official competition match during the current season, and some have officially debuted. They are those who have been promoted from the youth sector squads, with whom they regularly play for. Players in bold are those who have been called-up and/or featured with the senior squad.
Note: Flags indicate national team as defined under FIFA eligibility rules; some limited exceptions apply. Players may hold more than one non-FIFA nationality.

No.	Pos.	Nation	Player
—	DF	NGR	Richard Ajayi
—	DF	GER	Adam El-Chaar
—	DF	ALB	Afrim Gashi
—	DF	GER	Jakob Horvath
—	DF	GER	Rayan Moumouni
—	MF	POL	Kuba Horoszczak
—	MF	AUT	Matteo Marić

No.	Pos.	Nation	Player
—	MF	AUT	Michael Matošević
—	MF	KOS	**Erblin Osmani**
—	FW	GER	Chris Afanou
—	FW	NGR	Frank Egwuatu
—	FW	CMR	Aviel Hentcho
—	FW	CMR	Aristide Hentcho
—	FW	GER	Philipp von Taube

=== Out on loan ===
Players in bold are those who have been called-up and/or featured with the senior squad.

As of 26 July 2026

Note: Flags indicate national team as defined under FIFA eligibility rules; some limited exceptions apply. Players may hold more than one non-FIFA nationality.

No.	Pos.	Nation	Player
—	DF	AUT	Magnus Dalpiaz (at (Austria) TSV Hartberg until 30 June 2027)
—	DF	TUR	**Deniz Ofli** (at Karlsruher SC until 30 June 2027)
—	DF	GER	Julien Yanda (at (Spain) Eldense until 30 June 2027)

No.	Pos.	Nation	Player
—	MF	PER	**Felipe Chávez** (at 1. FC Magdeburg until 30 June 2027)
—	MF	ESP	**Javier Fernández** (at 1. FC Nürnberg until 30 June 2027)
—	FW	GER	Richard Meier (at SV Meppen until 30 June 2027)

== Coaching staff ==
Coaches
(Brazil) Dante	Head coach
(Germany) Dirk Teschke	Assistant coaches
(Germany) Josef Eibl	Assistant coaches
(Germany) Babak Keyhanfar	Assistant coaches
(Germany) Christian Ströbel	Assistant coaches
(Czech Republic) Jaroslav Drobný	Goalkeeping coach
(Luxembourg) Max Englaro	Athletics coach
(Germany) Maximilian Welzmüller	Individual coach
Functional team
(Germany) Moritz Renker	Physiotherapists
(Germany) Max Harzmann	Physiotherapists
(Germany) Dominikus Hoechner	Physiotherapists
(Germany) Samy Khalfallah	Team manager
(Germany) Dr. Jan-Philipp Müller	Team doctor
(Germany) Dr. Michael Senske	Match analysts
(Germany) Lennart Hasenbeck	Match analysts

== Recent managers ==
Recent managers of the club:

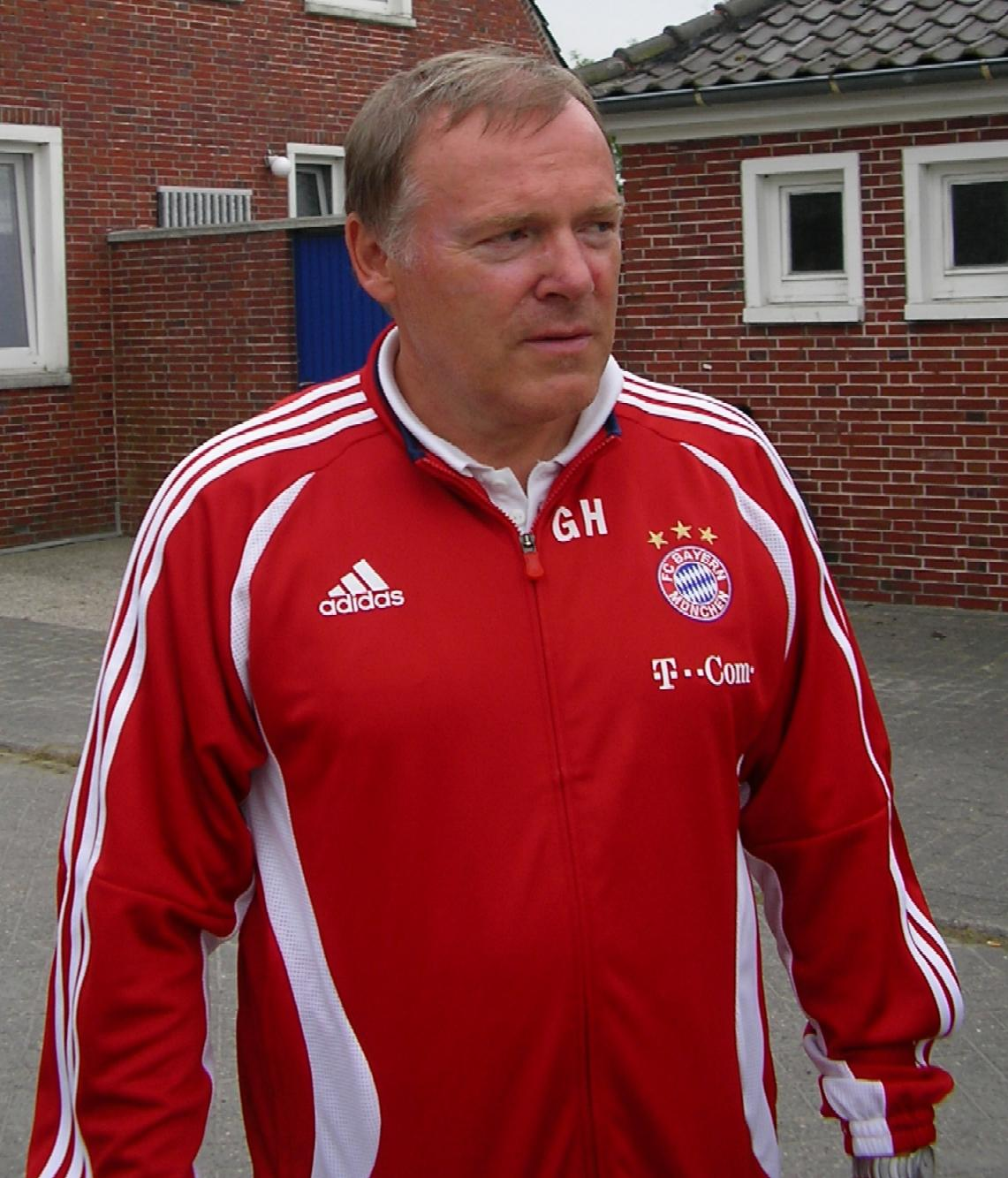
Hermann Gerland has had three spells as coach of the team

- (Germany) Heinz Lettl (1 July 1973 – 30 June 1974)
- (Germany) Werner Kern (1 July 1976 – 31 May 1977)
- (Germany) Fritz Bischoff (1 July 1986 – 30 June 1987)
- (Germany) Hans-Dieter Schmidt (1 July 1987 – 30 June 1989)
- (Germany) Fritz Bischoff (1 July 1989 – 30 June 1990)
- (Germany) Wolf Werner (1 July 1990 – 30 June 1992)
- (Germany) Hermann Gerland (1 July 1991 – 30 June 1995)
- (Germany) Rainer Ulrich (1 July 1995 – 30 June 1998)
- (Germany) Udo Bassemir (1 July 1998 – 28 March 2001)
- (Germany) Kurt Niedermayer (29 March 2001 – 30 June 2001)
- (Germany) Hermann Gerland (1 July 2001 – 26 April 2009)
- (Germany) Mehmet Scholl (27 April 2009 – 30 June 2010)
- (Germany) Hermann Gerland (1 July 2010 – 13 April 2011)
- (Germany) Rainer Ulrich (13 April 2011 – 30 June 2011)
- (Netherlands) Andries Jonker (1 July 2011 – 30 June 2012)
- (Germany) Mehmet Scholl (1 July 2012 – 30 June 2013)
- (Netherlands) Erik ten Hag (1 July 2013 – 30 June 2015)
- (Germany) Heiko Vogel (1 July 2015 – 21 March 2017)
- (Germany) Danny Schwarz (21 March 2017 – 30 June 2017)
- (Germany) Tim Walter (1 July 2017 – 30 June 2018)
- (Germany) Holger Seitz (1 July 2018 – 30 June 2019)
- (Germany) Sebastian Hoeneß (1 July 2019 – 26 July 2020)
- (Germany) Holger Seitz (25 August 2020 – 4 April 2021)
- (Germany) Danny Schwarz (4 April 2021 – 30 June 2021)
- (Argentina) Martín Demichelis (4 April 2021 – 13 September 2022)
- (Germany) Holger Seitz (September 2022 – 30 June 2026)
- (Brazil) Dante (1 July 2026 – )

== Honours ==
The club's honours:

=== League ===
- German amateur football championship
  - Runners-up: 1982–83, 1986–87
  - Quateur Finals: 1983–84
- Amateurliga Südbayern (III)
  - Runners-up: 1957–58, 1960–61
- Amateur Oberliga Bayern (III)
  - Runners-up: 1982–83, 1983–84, 1986–87
- Regionalliga Süd (III)
  - Champions: 2003–04
- 3. Liga (III)
  - Champions: 2019–20*
- 2. Amateurliga Oberbayern A (IV)
  - Champions: 1955–56
- Landesliga Bayern-Süd (IV)
  - Champions: 1966–67, 1972–73*
- Regionalliga Bayern (IV)
  - Champions: 2013–14*, 2018–19*
  - Runners-up: 2012–13, 2014–15, 2016–17, 2017–18, 2021–22

20xx* both champions with first team: FC Bayern Munich

=== Cup ===
- DFB Pokal
  - Participations (9 times): 1975_R1, 1977_R2, 1983, 1985, 1994, 1995_QF, 1996, 2003, 2005_QF
  - Quarter-finals: (2 times 1995, 2005)
- Bavarian Cup
  - Winners: 2002
  - Finalist: 1995 (share with 1.FC Numberg II – no winner)
- Oberbayern Cup
  - Winners (3times): 1995, 2001, 2002

=== International ===
- Premier League International Cup
  - Winners: 2019
- IFA Shield (IFA)
  - Winners: 2005

== Recent record ==
The recent season-by-season performance of the club:

Season	Division	Tier	Position	Cup
1994–95	Regionalliga Süd	III	7	Quarter-final
1995–96	Regionalliga Süd	III	13	Round 1
1997–97	Regionalliga Süd	III	8	DNQ
1997–98	Regionalliga Süd	III	6	DNQ
1998–99	Regionalliga Süd	III	8	DNQ
1999–00	Regionalliga Süd	III	5	DNQ
2000–01	Regionalliga Süd	III	9	DNQ
2001–02	Regionalliga Süd	III	10	DNQ
2002–03	Regionalliga Süd	III	4	Round 1
2003–04	Regionalliga Süd	III	1	DNQ
2004–05	Regionalliga Süd	III	6	Quarter-final
2005–06	Regionalliga Süd	III	11	DNQ
2006–07	Regionalliga Süd	III	8	DNQ
2007–08	Regionalliga Süd	III	8 ↑	DNQ
2008–09	3. Liga	III	5	—
2009–10	3. Liga	III	8	—
2010–11	3. Liga	III	20 ↓	—
2011–12	Regionalliga Süd	IV	14	—
2012–13	Regionalliga Bayern	IV	2	—
2013–14	Regionalliga Bayern	IV	1	—
2014–15	Regionalliga Bayern	IV	2	—
2015–16	Regionalliga Bayern	IV	6	—
2016–17	Regionalliga Bayern	IV	2	—
2017–18	Regionalliga Bayern	IV	2	—
2018–19	Regionalliga Bayern	IV	1 ↑	—
2019–20	3. Liga	III	1	—
2020–21	3. Liga	III	18 ↓	—
2021–22	Regionalliga Bayern	IV	2	—
2022–23	Regionalliga Bayern	IV	3	—
2023–24	Regionalliga Bayern	IV	6	—
2024–25	Regionalliga Bayern	IV	4	—
2025–26	Regionalliga Bayern	IV	8	—

DNQ = Bayern II did not qualify for the cup in that season;
— = Since 2008–09 season reserve teams of professional clubs are no longer allowed to compete in the cup

- With the introduction of the Bezirksoberligas in 1988 as the new fifth tier, below the Landesligas, all leagues below dropped one tier. With the introduction of the Regionalligas in 1994 and the 3. Liga in 2008 as the new third tier, below the 2. Bundesliga, all leagues below dropped one tier. With the establishment of the Regionalliga Bayern as the new fourth tier in Bavaria in 2012 the Bayernliga was split into a northern and a southern division, the number of Landesligas expanded from three to five and the Bezirksoberligas abolished. All leagues from the Bezirksligas onward were elevated one tier.

↑ Promoted	↓ Relegated	Champions
