= 2026–27 Regionalliga =

19th season of the Regionalliga

Regionalliga
- Season: 2026–27

The 2026–27 Regionalliga is the 19th season of the Regionalliga, the 15th under the current format, as the fourth tier of the German football league system.

== Format ==
According to the promotion rules decided upon in 2019, the Regionalliga Südwest and West receive a direct promotion spot. Based on a rotation principle, the Regionalliga Nordost is expected to receive the third direct promotion spot this season, while the Regionalliga Nord and Bayern champions are expected to play a promotion play-off.

== Regionalliga Nord ==
Eighteen teams from the states of Bremen, Hamburg, Lower Saxony and Schleswig-Holstein compete in the 15th season of the reformed Regionalliga Nord. Atlas Delmenhorst was promoted from the 2025–26 Oberliga Niedersachsen, Eimsbütteler TV from the 2025–26 Oberliga Hamburg and SV Todesfelde from the 2025–26 Schleswig-Holstein-Liga.

Pos	Team	Pld	W	D	L	GF	GA	GD	Pts	Qualification or relegation
1	Hannover 96 II	19	12	4	3	44	28	+16	40	Qualification for promotion play-offs
2	Weiche Flensburg	19	12	2	5	49	24	+25	38	
3	VfB Oldenburg	18	12	2	4	49	24	+25	38	
4	SV Drochtersen/Assel	19	11	4	4	54	27	+27	37	
5	Phönix Lübeck	17	10	5	2	44	16	+28	35	
6	FSV Schöningen	17	9	3	5	27	28	−1	30	
7	Kickers Emden	19	6	6	7	44	46	−2	24	
8	VfB Lübeck	17	5	7	5	26	29	−3	22	
9	SSV Jeddeloh	19	6	4	9	31	39	−8	22	
10	Atlas Delmenhorst	16	5	6	5	23	26	−3	21	
11	Eimsbütteler TV	18	5	5	8	28	42	−14	20	
12	Hamburger SV II	18	6	1	11	30	42	−12	19	
13	Werder Bremen II	18	5	3	10	28	35	−7	18	
14	HSC Hannover	18	4	6	8	25	40	−15	18	Possible relegation to Oberliga
15	Bremer SV	18	5	3	10	17	32	−15	18	Possible relegation to Oberliga
16	SV Todesfelde	18	4	4	10	28	53	−25	16	Possible relegation to Oberliga
17	FC St. Pauli II	16	4	2	10	28	31	−3	14	Relegation to Oberliga
18	Eintracht Norderstedt	16	3	5	8	31	44	−13	14	Relegation to Oberliga

Updated to match(es) played on 21 November 2026. Source: kicker.de
Rules for classification: 1) Points; 2) Goal difference; 3) Goals scored

=== Top scorers ===
As of 15 November 2026

Rank	Player	Club	Goals
1	(Germany) Mats Facklam	VfB Oldenburg	17
1	(Germany) Luc Ihorst	Kickers Emden	17
3	(Germany) Tom Sanne	SV Drochtersen/Assel	16
4	(Kosovo) Erolind Krasniqi	SC Weiche Flensburg 08	11
4	(Germany) Christopher Schepp	SV Drochtersen/Assel	11
6	(Germany) Ibrahim Ali	SC Weiche Flensburg 08	10
6	(Netherlands) Julian Markvoort Beke	1. FC Phönix Lübeck	10
8	(Guinea) Moussa Doumbouya	FSV Schöningen	9
8	(Germany) Rasmus Tobinski	SC Weiche Flensburg 08	9
10	(Germany) Bastian Redecker	Bremer SV	8
10	(Germany) Theo Schröder	Kickers Emden	8
10	(Germany) Jack Wardius	FC St. Pauli II	8

== Regionalliga Nordost ==
Eighteen teams from the states of Berlin, Brandenburg, Mecklenburg-Vorpommern, Saxony, Saxony-Anhalt and Thuringia compete in the 15th season of the reformed Regionalliga Nordost. Erzgebirge Aue was relegated from the 2025–26 3. Liga. Tasmania Berlin was promoted from the 2025–26 NOFV-Oberliga Nord and RSV Eintracht from the 2025–26 NOFV-Oberliga Süd.

Pos	Team	Pld	W	D	L	GF	GA	GD	Pts	Promotion or relegation
1	Rot-Weiß Erfurt	17	12	4	1	51	19	+32	40	Promotion to 3. Liga
2	Chemnitzer FC	17	11	3	3	36	17	+19	36	
3	Erzgebirge Aue	17	10	3	4	29	20	+9	33	
4	BFC Dynamo	16	9	5	2	25	13	+12	32	
5	Hallescher FC	16	8	7	1	25	14	+11	31	
6	VSG Altglienicke	17	9	3	5	32	23	+9	30	
7	Greifswalder FC	17	8	5	4	36	25	+11	29	
8	Carl Zeiss Jena	17	8	3	6	25	17	+8	27	
9	Lokomotive Leipzig	17	7	6	4	35	29	+6	27	
10	1. FC Magdeburg II	17	6	4	7	35	36	−1	22	
11	FSV Zwickau	17	5	5	7	21	30	−9	20	
12	SV Babelsberg	17	4	4	9	17	31	−14	16	
13	BFC Preussen	16	3	6	7	20	23	−3	15	
14	Chemie Leipzig	16	3	5	8	18	25	−7	14	
15	Hertha BSC II	17	2	7	8	18	33	−15	13	
16	Tasmania Berlin	17	3	3	11	27	51	−24	12	
17	RSV Eintracht	17	2	3	12	16	39	−23	9	Possible relegation to NOFV-Oberliga
18	FSV Luckenwalde	17	2	2	13	18	39	−21	8	Relegation to NOFV-Oberliga

Updated to match(es) played on 21 November 2026. Source: kicker.de
Rules for classification: 1) Points; 2) Goal difference; 3) Goals scored

=== Top scorers ===
As of 2 September 2026

Rank	Player	Club	Goals
1	(Germany) Colin Kroll-Thiel	Greifswalder FC	5
2	(Niger) Isma Baraze Adam	RSV Eintracht	4
2	(Japan) Hinata Gonda	Rot-Weiß Erfurt	4
2	(Germany) Jonas Marx	Chemnitzer FC	4
2	(Germany) Emilio Munser	Carl Zeiss Jena	4
2	(Germany) Niclas Stierlin	Hallescher FC	4

== Regionalliga West ==
Eighteen teams from North Rhine-Westphalia compete in the 15th season of the reformed Regionalliga West. SV Bergisch Gladbach was promoted from the 2025–26 Mittelrheinliga, VfB Hilden from the 2025–26 Oberliga Niederrhein, and Westfalia Rhynern and SG Wattenscheid from the 2025–26 Oberliga Westfalen.

The best-placed Westphalian non-reserve team will qualify for the 2027–28 DFB-Pokal.

Pos	Team	Pld	W	D	L	GF	GA	GD	Pts	Promotion, qualification or relegation
1	Rot-Weiß Oberhausen	16	12	2	2	36	13	+23	38	Promotion to 3. Liga and qualification for DFB-Pokal
2	Borussia Dortmund II	17	11	5	1	34	16	+18	38	
3	Borussia Mönchengladbach II	16	10	2	4	41	18	+23	32	
4	Sportfreunde Siegen	17	9	5	3	41	22	+19	32	
5	FC Gütersloh	16	10	2	4	32	22	+10	32	
6	Bonner SC	16	6	6	4	31	26	+5	24	
7	1. FC Köln II	17	6	6	5	33	30	+3	24	
8	Westfalia Rhynern	17	6	5	6	27	30	−3	23	
9	VfB Hilden	17	6	5	6	22	29	−7	23	
10	1. FC Bocholt	17	5	7	5	36	38	−2	22	
11	SC Paderborn II	17	5	6	6	29	30	−1	21	
12	Schalke 04 II	17	6	2	9	30	38	−8	20	
13	VfL Bochum II	17	5	4	8	28	38	−10	19	
14	SV Rödinghausen	17	4	5	8	28	33	−5	17	
15	SV Bergisch Gladbach	17	5	2	10	26	41	−15	17	Possible relegation to Oberliga
16	SG Wattenscheid	17	3	5	9	22	32	−10	14	Relegation to Oberliga
17	SC Wiedenbrück	17	3	3	11	25	41	−16	12	Relegation to Oberliga
18	Sportfreunde Lotte	17	1	4	12	10	34	−24	7	Relegation to Oberliga

Updated to match(es) played on 21 November 2026. Source: kicker.de
Rules for classification: 1) Points; 2) Goal difference; 3) Goals scored

=== Top scorers ===
As of 2 September 2026

Rank	Player	Club	Goals
1	(Czech Republic) Patrik Twardzik	FC Gütersloh	7
2	(Germany) Timur Mehmet Kesim	Rot-Weiß Oberhausen	5
2	(Germany) Jean-Paul Ndiaye	Schalke 04 II	5
2	(Germany) Thilo Töpken	Borussia Mönchengladbach II	5
2	(Germany) Davud Tuma	SC Wiedenbrück	5

== Regionalliga Südwest ==
Eighteen teams from Baden-Württemberg, Hesse, Rhineland-Palatinate and Saarland compete in the 15th season of the Regionalliga Südwest. SSV Ulm was relegated from the 2025–26 3. Liga. Eintracht Frankfurt II was promoted from the 2025–26 Hessenliga, VfR Aalen and VfR Mannheim from the 2025–26 Oberliga Baden-Württemberg, and 1. FC Kaiserslautern II from the 2025–26 Oberliga Rheinland-Pfalz/Saar.

Pos	Team	Pld	W	D	L	GF	GA	GD	Pts	Promotion or relegation
1	SGV Heilbronn-Freiberg	17	9	8	0	43	16	+27	35	Promotion to 3. Liga
2	VfR Mannheim	16	10	5	1	27	11	+16	35	
3	VfR Aalen	17	9	4	4	28	18	+10	31	
4	Eintracht Trier	17	9	3	5	22	21	+1	30	
5	Kickers Offenbach	17	8	4	5	30	22	+8	28	
6	Stuttgarter Kickers	16	8	3	5	26	20	+6	27	
7	FC 08 Homburg	17	7	6	4	25	19	+6	27	
8	TSV Steinbach Haiger	17	6	6	5	28	23	+5	24	
9	SC Freiburg II	17	5	6	6	26	25	+1	21	
10	FSV Frankfurt	17	5	5	7	26	29	−3	20	
11	Astoria Walldorf	17	5	5	7	23	26	−3	20	
12	SV Sandhausen	15	5	5	5	22	25	−3	20	
13	Hessen Kassel	17	5	3	9	26	38	−12	18	
14	Eintracht Frankfurt II	16	5	2	9	20	25	−5	17	Possible relegation to Oberliga
15	SSV Ulm	17	2	9	6	20	26	−6	15	Possible relegation to Oberliga
16	Mainz 05 II	16	4	2	10	16	32	−16	14	Relegation to Oberliga
17	Barockstadt Fulda-Lehnerz	17	3	4	10	19	32	−13	13	Relegation to Oberliga
18	1. FC Kaiserslautern II	17	2	6	9	16	35	−19	12	Relegation to Oberliga

Updated to match(es) played on 21 November 2026. Source: kicker.de
Rules for classification: 1) Points; 2) Goal difference; 3) Goals scored; 4) Head-to-head points; 5) Head-to-head goal difference; 6) Head-to-head goals scored; 7) Head-to-head away goals scored; 8) Away goals scored; 9) Play-off (only when deciding promotion or relegation)

=== Top scorers ===
As of 8 September 2026

Rank	Player	Club	Goals
1	(Germany) Krish Raweri	SC Freiburg II	4
1	(Germany) Fabian Rüdlin	SC Freiburg II	4
1	(Germany) Maximilian Schmid	Kickers Offenbach	4
1	(Germany) Benedikt von Hagen	Kickers Offenbach	4
1	(Germany) Maximilian Wolfram	Kickers Offenbach	4
6	eleven players		3

== Regionalliga Bayern ==
Nineteen teams from Bavaria compete in the 15th season of the Regionalliga Bayern. 1860 Munich and 1. FC Schweinfurt were relegated from the 2025–26 3. Liga. SC Eltersdorf was promoted from the 2025–26 Bayernliga Nord and TSV Landsberg from the 2025–26 Bayernliga Süd.

Pos	Team	Pld	W	D	L	GF	GA	GD	Pts	Qualification or relegation
1	FC Memmingen	19	13	3	3	24	9	+15	42	Qualification for promotion play-offs and DFB-Pokal
2	TSV Buchbach	19	10	5	4	38	27	+11	35	
3	1860 Munich	18	9	7	2	36	22	+14	34	
4	FV Illertissen	19	8	6	5	34	21	+13	30	
5	SpVgg Unterhaching	18	7	8	3	22	16	+6	29	
6	SpVgg Bayreuth	19	9	1	9	36	28	+8	28	
7	1. FC Nürnberg II (Note: Reserve teams are ineligible for qualification for the DFB-Pokal.)	19	8	4	7	32	26	+6	28	
8	FC Augsburg II	19	8	4	7	30	32	−2	28	
9	VfB Eichstätt	19	7	4	8	22	28	−6	25	
10	Schwaben Augsburg	19	7	4	8	22	31	−9	25	
11	Bayern Munich II	16	6	6	4	28	22	+6	24	
12	1. FC Schweinfurt	19	6	6	7	24	32	−8	24	
13	Wacker Burghausen	19	6	5	8	38	34	+4	23	
14	DJK Vilzing	18	5	7	6	25	29	−4	22	
15	SC Eltersdorf	18	5	6	7	25	26	−1	21	
16	SpVgg Ansbach	18	5	4	9	18	32	−14	19	Qualification for relegation play-offs
17	TSV Aubstadt	19	3	6	10	21	30	−9	15	Qualification for relegation play-offs
18	Greuther Fürth II	18	3	5	10	19	31	−12	14	Relegation to Bayernliga
19	TSV Landsberg	19	2	7	10	23	41	−18	13	Relegation to Bayernliga

Updated to match(es) played on 21 November 2026. Source: kicker.de
Rules for classification: 1) Points; 2) Goal difference; 3) Goals scored

=== Top scorers ===
As of 30 August 2026

Rank	Player	Club	Goals
1	(Germany) Andreas Jünger	DJK Vilzing	5
2	(Germany) Samed Bahar	TSV Buchbach	4
2	(Germany) Michael Eberwein	1860 Munich	4
2	(Germany) Moritz Leitner	Wacker Burghausen	4
2	(Germany) Jason Prodanović	1. FC Schweinfurt	4

=== Relegation play-offs ===
Team 1	Agg.	Team 2	1st leg	2nd leg
Bayernliga Nord/Süd runners-up		Regionalliga Bayern 16th/17th place	TBD	TBD
Bayernliga Nord/Süd runners-up		Regionalliga Bayern 16th/17th place	TBD	TBD

== Promotion play-offs ==
Team 1	Agg.	Team 2	1st leg	2nd leg
Regionalliga Nord		Regionalliga Bayern	TBD	TBD

All times Central European Summer Time (UTC+2)

Regionalliga Nord	v	Regionalliga Bayern

Regionalliga Bayern	v	Regionalliga Nord
