= 2024–25 FC Bayern Munich season =

126th season in existence of FC Bayern Munich

Bayern Munich
2024–25 season
- President: Herbert Hainer
- Head coach: Vincent Kompany
- Stadium: Allianz Arena
- Bundesliga: 1st
- DFB-Pokal: Round of 16
- UEFA Champions League: Quarter-finals
- FIFA Club World Cup: Quarter-finals
- Top goalscorer: League: Harry Kane (26); All: Harry Kane (41)
- Average home league attendance: 75,000
- Biggest win: Bayern Munich 10–0 Auckland City; 15 June 2025, Club World Cup
- Biggest defeat: Barcelona 4–1 Bayern Munich; 23 October 2024, Champions League; Feyenoord 3–0 Bayern Munich; 22 January 2025, Champions League
| Home colours | Away colours | Third colours |

The 2024–25 season was the 126th season in the history of Bayern Munich, and the club's 60th consecutive season in the top flight of German football. In addition to the domestic league, the club participated in this season's editions of the DFB-Pokal, the UEFA Champions League, and the FIFA Club World Cup.

Following Bayer Leverkusen's 2–2 draw with SC Freiburg on 4 May 2025, Bayern Munich secured the Bundesliga title, their 12th title in 13 seasons, and record-extending 33rd Bundesliga title overall.

== Summary ==
=== Pre-season ===
On 1 March 2024, Bayern Munich announced the appointment of German executive Max Eberl as a board member for sport, after Austrian executive Christoph Freund was appointed as the sporting director a season before. Together, the pair promised to build a new direction and philosophy for the club, extending the contracts of both Mathys Tel and Alexander Nübel, that would tie them down to Bayern Munich until 2029.

After the 2023–24 season concluded, as well as the end of Thomas Tuchel's tenure as head coach, the club announced the signing of new head coach, former professional footballer and Belgian international Vincent Kompany, on 29 May 2024. Eberl and Freund were the two strongest forces behind the signing of Kompany on a three-year contract until 2027; the pair approached him while he was still under contract with English Premier League club Burnley after facing relegation to the EFL Championship, and Bayern paid a compensation fee that was dealt with the English club.

At an official press conference, both Eberl and Freund gave some insights about their direction, strategies and goals for the club within their philosophy along with the new head coach. They asserted that the club was approaching a concrete attacking style of play with and without the ball, and a bigger and closer focus in the reserve team Bayern Munich II, with the objective to make the bridge for young talents to integrate with the senior team more consistent, the transition and development of assembling a senior team with top-class players, as well as to keep on building a stronger youth sector in order to further develop young football talents.

On 14 November 2023, Bayern Munich announced the signing of young Australian talent Nestory Irankunda from A-League Men club Adelaide United. He joined the club in July 2024.

After joining the club on loan from Premier League club Tottenham Hotspur in January 2024, Eric Dier made a permanent move to Bayern Munich due to a clause in his contract.

Following a similar trajectory to Dier, Bryan Zaragoza signed for the club in February 2024, initially on a six-month loan from Spanish La Liga club Granada.

Both Eric Maxim Choupo-Moting and Bouna Sarr did not renew their contracts with the club for the 2024–25 season, opting to become free agents.

Bayern Munich signed both attacking midfielder Maurice Krattenmacher (aged 18) and forward Gibson Adu (aged 16), from 3. Liga club SpVgg Unterhaching, immediately loaning Nana Adu back with SpVgg Unterhaching for the 2024–25 season.

On 13 June 2024, Bayern Munich signed defender and Japanese international Hiroki Itō from fellow Bundesliga club VfB Stuttgart, on a contract until 2028, after they had triggered his release clause of an estimated €30,000,000.

On 16 May 2024, Bayern Munich extended the contract of young midfielder and German international Aleksandar Pavlović until June 2029.

On 21 June 2024, Bayern Munich officially announced the new staff for the 2024–25 season, which included three new assistant coaches: Aaron Danks, whom they signed from Middlesbrough and previously worked with Vincent Kompany at Anderlecht, René Marić, who was recently appointed as head coach of the under-19 team, and Floribert N'Galula, who followed Vincent Kompany from Burnley. Bram Geers was announced as the new athletic coach, and Rodyse Munienge as an assistant in the organizational area. Days later, the club announced the signing of Walter Gfrerer from fellow Bundesliga club VfL Wolfsburg, as the new head of performance for all squads, including the senior team, the women's team, the reserve team, and the youth academy teams.

On 27 June 2024, Bayern Munich extended the contract of Croatian international defender Josip Stanišić until 2029, after he returned from his Bayer Leverkusen loan spell, where he won both the 2023–24 Bundesliga and 2023–24 DFB-Pokal titles.

On 1 July 2024, Bayern Munich activated the buy-back option for Armindo Sieb from 2. Bundesliga club Greuther Fürth for a €1.5 million estimated fee; Sieb signed a contract until 2027, before immediately joining fellow Bundesliga club Mainz 05 on a two-year loan. A day later, on 2 July, the contract of Arijon Ibrahimović was extended until 2027.

On 7 July 2024, the club announced the signing of French winger Michael Olise from English Premier League club Crystal Palace for a €55 million estimated fee, on a contract until 2029.

On 11 July 2024, Bayern Munich signed Portuguese international midfielder João Palhinha from English Premier League club Fulham for a €50 million estimated fee, on a contract until 2028.

On 12 July 2024, the club extended the contract of Matteo Pérez Vinlöf until 2027, and sent him on a season-long loan to Austrian Bundesliga club Austria Wien for further development.

On 9 August 2024, Bayern Munich sent Bryan Zaragoza to La Liga club Osasuna on a season-long loan.

On 13 August 2024, both defenders Matthijs de Ligt and Noussair Mazraoui were permanently transferred to English Premier League club Manchester United for an estimated combined fee of around €60 million, reuniting with head coach Erik ten Hag, whom they worked together previously at Dutch Eredivisie club Ajax.

On 30 August 2024, the club extended Gabriel Vidović contract until 2026, and sent him to fellow Bundesliga club Mainz 05 on a season-long loan.

=== Mid season ===
After the winter break Frans Krätzig's season-long loan was early cut off short after just six months with VfB Stuttgart, with whom he barely had minutes of playing time, returning to Bayern Munich on 2 January 2025. The next day on 3 January 2025, he joined fellow Bundesliga club 1. FC Heidenheim on a sixth-month loan until the end of the 2024–25 season, reuniting with fellow academy graduate Paul Wanner.

Shortly after, on 4 January 2025, Nestory Irankunda joined Swiss Super League club Grasshopper Club Zurich, on a sixth-month loan until the end of the season, after he only managed to perform with Bayern Munich II on the Regionalliga Bayern during his first six months with the club.

On 13 January 2024, academy graduate forward Arijon Ibrahimović moved back to Italy and joined Serie A club Lazio on a six-month loan until the end of the season, with an option to make the move permanent.

Bajung Darboe signed with Bayern Munich from MLS Next Pro club Los Angeles FC 2, and was presented as a new player on 15 January 2025, immediately joining the reserve team, although the signing was initially reported months back in November 2024.

On 21 January 2025, Tom Bischof agreed to join Bayern Munich ahead of the 2025–26 season, when his contract with TSG Hoffenheim expires, he signed a four-year contract through June 2029 once becoming a free agent.

== Players ==
Note: Flags indicate national team as defined under FIFA eligibility rules; some limited exceptions apply. Players may hold more than one non-FIFA nationality.

| No. | Pos. | Nation | Player |
|---|---|---|---|
| 1 | GK | GER | Manuel Neuer (captain) |
| 2 | DF | FRA | Dayot Upamecano |
| 3 | DF | KOR | Kim Min-jae |
| 6 | MF | GER | Joshua Kimmich (3rd captain) |
| 7 | FW | GER | Serge Gnabry |
| 8 | MF | GER | Leon Goretzka (4th captain) |
| 9 | FW | ENG | Harry Kane |
| 10 | FW | GER | Leroy Sané |
| 11 | FW | FRA | Kingsley Coman |
| 15 | DF | ENG | Eric Dier |
| 16 | MF | POR | João Palhinha |
| 17 | FW | FRA | Michael Olise |
| 18 | GK | ISR | Daniel Peretz |
| 19 | MF | CAN | Alphonso Davies |
| 21 | DF | JPN | Hiroki Itō |
| 22 | DF | POR | Raphaël Guerreiro |
| 23 | DF | FRA | Sacha Boey |
| 24 | MF | CRO | Gabriel Vidović |

| No. | Pos. | Nation | Player |
|---|---|---|---|
| 25 | FW | GER | Thomas Müller (vice-captain) |
| 26 | GK | GER | Sven Ulreich |
| 27 | MF | AUT | Konrad Laimer |
| 28 | DF | GER | Tarek Buchmann |
| 32 | MF | GER | Adin Ličina |
| 33 | MF | ESP | Javier Fernández |
| 35 | GK | GER | Max Schmitt |
| 36 | FW | GER | Wisdom Mike |
| 37 | GK | AUS | Anthony Pavlešić |
| 40 | GK | GER | Jonas Urbig |
| 41 | FW | SWE | Jonah Kusi-Asare |
| 42 | MF | GER | Jamal Musiala |
| 43 | MF | DEN | Jonathan Asp Jensen |
| 44 | DF | CRO | Josip Stanišić |
| 45 | MF | GER | Aleksandar Pavlović |
| 46 | MF | GER | Lennart Karl |
| 48 | GK | GER | Leon Klanac |

== Transfers ==
=== In ===
| Date | Pos. | Player | From | Type | Fee | Ref. |
|---|---|---|---|---|---|---|
| 30 June 2024 | DF | (Croatia) Josip Stanišić | (Germany) Bayer Leverkusen | Loan return | —N/a | |
| 30 June 2024 | DF | (Germany) Frans Krätzig | Austria Wien | Loan return | —N/a | |
| 30 June 2024 | MF | (Germany) Paul Wanner | (Germany) SV Elversberg | Loan return | —N/a | |
| 30 June 2024 | MF | (Germany) Arijon Ibrahimović | (Italy) Frosinone | Loan return | —N/a | |
| 30 June 2024 | MF | (Croatia) Gabriel Vidović | (Croatia) Dinamo Zagreb | Loan return | —N/a | |
| 30 June 2024 | FW | (Germany) Yusuf Kabadayı | (Germany) Schalke 04 | Loan return | —N/a | |
| 1 July 2024 | DF | (England) Eric Dier | (England) Tottenham Hotspur | Transfer | Free | |
| 1 July 2024 | FW | (Spain) Bryan Zaragoza | (Spain) Granada | Transfer | €13,000,000 | |
| 1 July 2024 | FW | (Australia) Nestory Irankunda | (Australia) Adelaide United | Transfer | Undisclosed | |
| 1 July 2024 | MF | (Germany) Maurice Krattenmacher | (Germany) SpVgg Unterhaching | Transfer | Undisclosed | |
| 1 July 2024 | FW | (Germany) Gibson Adu | (Germany) SpVgg Unterhaching | Transfer | Undisclosed | |
| 1 July 2024 | GK | (Germany) Hannes Heilmair | (Germany) SpVgg Unterhaching | Transfer | Free | |
| 1 July 2024 | DF | (Japan) Hiroki Itō | (Germany) VfB Stuttgart | Transfer | €23,500,000 | |
| 1 July 2024 | FW | (Germany) Armindo Sieb | (Germany) Greuther Fürth | Transfer | €1,500,000 | |
| 1 July 2024 | DF | (Netherlands) Chivano Wijks | (Netherlands) Feyenoord | Transfer | €100,000 | |
| 1 July 2024 | FW | (France) Noah Codjo-Evora | (France) Annecy | Transfer | Free | |
| 1 July 2024 | MF | (Austria) Michael Matošević | (Austria) SV Ried | Transfer | Undisclosed | |
| 1 July 2024 | DF | (Germany) Adam El-Chaar | (Germany) Fortuna Düsseldorf | Transfer | Free | |
| 3 July 2024 | MF | (Italy) Guido Della Rovere | (Italy) Cremonese | Transfer | Undisclosed | |
| 7 July 2024 | DF | (Germany) Cassiano Kiala | (Germany) Hertha BSC | Transfer | Free | |
| 7 July 2024 | MF | (France) Michael Olise | (England) Crystal Palace | Transfer | €53,000,000 | |
| 11 July 2024 | MF | (Portugal) João Palhinha | (England) Fulham | Transfer | €51,000,000 | |
| 1 January 2025 | FW | (United States) Bajung Darboe | (United States) Los Angeles FC 2 | Transfer | €1,500,000 | |
| 1 January 2025 | MF | (Brazil) Maycon Cardozo | —N/a | Transfer | Free | |
| 2 January 2025 | DF | (Germany) Frans Krätzig | (Germany) VfB Stuttgart | Loan return | —N/a | |
| 15 January 2025 | MF | (Nigeria) David Emmanuel | —N/a | Transfer | Free | |
| 20 January 2025 | DF | (Germany) Max Scholze | (Germany) SC Verl | Loan return | —N/a | |
| 27 January 2025 | DF | (Germany) Julien Yanda | (Germany) FC St. Pauli | Transfer | Undisclosed | |
| 27 January 2025 | GK | (Germany) Jonas Urbig | (Germany) 1. FC Köln | Transfer | €7,000,000 | |
| 3 February 2025 | MF | (Croatia) Gabriel Vidović | (Germany) Mainz 05 | Loan return | —N/a | |
| 1 June 2025^{a} | DF | (Morocco) Adam Aznou | (Spain) Valladolid | Loan return | —N/a | |
| 1 June 2025^{a} | MF | (Germany) Maurice Krattenmacher | (Germany) SSV Ulm | Loan return | —N/a | |
| 9 June 2025^{a} | MF | (Germany) Tom Bischof | (Germany) TSG Hoffenheim | Transfer | Undisclosed | |
| 9 June 2025^{a} | DF | (Germany) Jonathan Tah | (Germany) Bayer Leverkusen | Transfer | Undisclosed | |

Total spending: ▼€140.6M

=== Out ===
| Date | Pos. | Player | To | Type | Fee | Ref. |
|---|---|---|---|---|---|---|
| 1 July 2024 | DF | (Germany) David Herold | (Germany) Karlsruher SC | From loan to definitive purchase | €750,000 | |
| 1 July 2024 | MF | (United States) Malik Tillman | (Netherlands) PSV Eindhoven | From loan to definitive purchase | €12,000,000 | |
| 1 July 2024 | GK | (Germany) Johannes Schenk | (Germany) Preußen Münster | From loan to definitive purchase | €100,000 | |
| 1 July 2024 | FW | (Germany) Robert Ramsak | (Germany) RB Leipzig | End of contract | | |
| 1 July 2024 | FW | (Cameroon) Eric Maxim Choupo-Moting | (United States) New York Red Bulls | End of contract | | |
| 1 July 2024 | DF | (Senegal) Bouna Sarr | —N/a | End of contract | | |
| 1 July 2024 | MF | (Turkey) Salih Şen | (Turkey) Şanlıurfaspor | End of contract | | |
| 1 July 2024 | GK | (Germany) Leon Markert | (Germany) FC Ingolstadt 04 II | End of contract | | |
| 1 July 2024 | DF | (Germany) Rareș Canea | Retired | | | |
| 1 July 2024 | GK | (Germany) Manuel Kainz | Retired | | | |
| 1 July 2024 | MF | (Germany) Maurice Krattenmacher | (Germany) SSV Ulm | Loan | —N/a | |
| 1 July 2024 | MF | (South Korea) Lee Hyun-ju | (Germany) Hannover 96 | Loan | —N/a | |
| 1 July 2024 | MF | (Germany) Paul Wanner | (Germany) 1. FC Heidenheim | Loan | —N/a | |
| 1 July 2024 | DF | (Germany) Frans Krätzig | (Germany) VfB Stuttgart | Loan | €500,000 | |
| 1 July 2024 | DF | (Germany) Max Scholze | (Germany) SC Verl | Loan | —N/a | |
| 1 July 2024 | FW | (Germany) Armindo Sieb | (Germany) Mainz 05 | Loan | —N/a | |
| 1 July 2024 | FW | (Germany) Gibson Adu | (Germany) SpVgg Unterhaching | Loan | —N/a | |
| 1 July 2024 | DF | (Germany) Maximilian Hennig | (Germany) SpVgg Unterhaching | Loan | —N/a | |
| 1 July 2024 | FW | (Germany) Lenn Jastremski | (Germany) SpVgg Unterhaching | Transfer | Undisclosed | |
| 1 July 2024 | GK | (Germany) Jakob Mayer | (Germany) VSG Altglienicke | Transfer | Undisclosed | |
| 1 July 2024 | DF | (Germany) Justin Janitzek | (Germany) Wehen Wiesbaden | Transfer | Undisclosed | |
| 1 July 2024 | DF | (Ukraine) Dmytro Strilchuk | (Ukraine) Shakhtar Donetsk | Transfer | Free | |
| 1 July 2024 | DF | (Germany) Mohamed Sahid | (Germany) TSG Hoffenheim | Transfer | Free | |
| 2 July 2024 | MF | (Germany) Torben Rhein | (Netherlands) Emmen | Transfer | Undisclosed | |
| 2 July 2024 | DF | (Germany) Jamie Lawrence | (Austria) WSG Tirol | Transfer | Undisclosed | |
| 3 July 2024 | GK | (Germany) Tom Ritzy Hülsmann | (Austria) SKN St. Pölten | Loan | —N/a | |
| 4 July 2024 | FW | (Germany) Yusuf Kabadayı | (Germany) FC Augsburg | Transfer | €900,000 | |
| 4 July 2024 | MF | (Japan) Taichi Fukui | (Portugal) Arouca | Loan | —N/a | |
| 4 July 2024 | MF | (Croatia) Lovro Zvonarek | (Austria) Sturm Graz | Loan | —N/a | |
| 5 July 2024 | DF | (Scotland) Liam Morrison | (England) Queens Park Rangers | Transfer | Undisclosed | |
| 9 July 2024 | FW | (Kosovo) Dion Berisha | (Germany) Rot-Weiss Essen | Transfer | Undisclosed | |
| 11 July 2024 | FW | (Germany) David Bausch | —N/a | Undisclosed | | |
| 12 July 2024 | DF | (Sweden) Matteo Pérez Vinlöf | Austria Wien | Loan | —N/a | |
| 15 July 2024 | GK | (Germany) Lukas Schneller | (Germany) 1. FC Schweinfurt 05 | Loan | —N/a | |
| 19 July 2024 | MF | (United States) Robert Deziel Jr. | (Germany) VSG Altglienicke | Loan | —N/a | |
| 30 July 2024 | FW | (Italy) Manuel Pisano | (Italy) Como | Transfer | €500,000 | |
| 31 July 2024 | GK | (China) Liu Shaoziyang | (Austria) SV Horn | Transfer | Undisclosed | |
| 9 August 2024 | FW | (Spain) Bryan Zaragoza | (Spain) Osasuna | Loan | €250,000 | |
| 13 August 2024 | DF | (Netherlands) Matthijs de Ligt | (England) Manchester United | Transfer | €45,000,000 | |
| 13 August 2024 | DF | (Morocco) Noussair Mazraoui | (England) Manchester United | Transfer | €15,000,000 | |
| 14 August 2024 | MF | (Georgia (country)) Luka Parkadze | (Germany) VSG Altglienicke | Loan | —N/a | |
| 19 August 2024 | FW | (Luxembourg) David Jonathans | (Netherlands) Den Bosch | Loan | —N/a | |
| 23 August 2024 | MF | (Jordan) Yousef Qashi | (Germany) Wuppertaler SV | Loan | —N/a | |
| 29 August 2024 | DF | (Germany) Benedikt Wimmer | (Germany) Wuppertaler SV | Loan | —N/a | |
| 30 August 2024 | MF | (Croatia) Gabriel Vidović | (Germany) Mainz 05 | Loan | —N/a | |
| 31 August 2024 | FW | (Serbia) Marko Popović | (Germany) Türkgücü München | Loan | —N/a | |
| 31 August 2024 | FW | (Scotland) Barry Hepburn | —N/a | End of contract | | |
| 2 September 2024 | DF | (Germany) Leon Fust | (Russia) Kuban Krasnodar | End of contract | | |
| 9 September 2024 | DF | (Germany) Maher Darwich | (Switzerland) Grasshopper | Loan | —N/a | |
| 9 September 2024 | FW | (Switzerland) Gabriel González | (Switzerland) Grasshopper | Transfer | Free | |
| 1 January 2025 | MF | (Germany) Timo Kern | Retired | | | |
| 3 January 2025 | DF | (Germany) Frans Krätzig | (Germany) 1. FC Heidenheim | Loan | —N/a | |
| 4 January 2025 | FW | (Australia) Nestory Irankunda | (Switzerland) Grasshopper | Loan | —N/a | |
| 13 January 2025 | MF | (Germany) Arijon Ibrahimović | (Italy) Lazio | Loan | —N/a | |
| 15 January 2025 | FW | (Germany) Jason Eckl | (Germany) SpVgg Unterhaching | Loan | —N/a | |
| 16 January 2025 | MF | (Kosovo) Benjamin Dibrani | (Slovenia) Koper | Transfer | Undisclosed | |
| 27 January 2025 | DF | (Germany) Maher Darwich | (Switzerland) Grasshopper | Transfer | Undisclosed | |
| 28 January 2025 | DF | (United States) Grayson Dettoni | (Switzerland) Grasshopper | Loan | —N/a | |
| 31 January 2025 | MF | (Nigeria) David Emmanuel | (Germany) KSV Hessen Kassel | Loan | —N/a | |
| 31 January 2025 | DF | (Germany) Tim Hoffmann | (Germany) FC Ingolstadt 04 | Transfer | Free | |
| 1 February 2025 | MF | (Germany) Jona Preuß | —N/a | Undisclosed | | |
| 3 February 2025 | DF | (Morocco) Adam Aznou | (Spain) Valladolid | Loan | —N/a | |
| 3 February 2025 | MF | (Japan) Taichi Fukui | (Portugal) Arouca | From loan to definitive purchase | €1,600,000 | |
| 3 February 2025 | FW | (France) Mathys Tel | (England) Tottenham Hotspur | Loan | —N/a | |
| 3 February 2025 | MF | (Germany) Noël Aséko Nkili | (Germany) Hannover 96 | Loan | —N/a | |
| 18 February 2025 | MF | (Belgium) Christian Kouam | (Switzerland) Grasshopper | Transfer | Undisclosed | |
| 1 June 2025^{a} | DF | (Germany) Frans Krätzig | (Austria) Red Bull Salzburg | Transfer | Undisclosed | |

Total income: ▲€76.6M

Notes

- ^a Signed as part of an exceptional registration window from 1 to 10 June 2025 for clubs participating in the 2025 FIFA Club World Cup.

== Pre-season and friendlies ==
Win Draw Loss Fixtures

Bayern met Regionalliga side 1. FC Düren for a friendly match in their neighbouring town of Jülich. On 3 and 10 August 2024, Bayern faced Tottenham Hotspur twice in friendly matches. Bayern played a friendly against Grasshopper at FC Bayern Campus on 20 August.

| 24 July 2024 Friendly | FC Rottach-Egern | 1–14 | Bayern Munich | Rottach-Egern, Germany |
| 18:30 CEST | Schlichtner 29' | Report | Ličina 25', 26'; Tel 27', 28', 41'; Mazraoui 33'; Guerreiro 42'; Ibrahimović 56'; Sadat 60', 69'; Irankunda 61'; Boey 66'; Asp Jensen 79'; Aséko Nkili 80' | Stadium: Stadion am Birkenmoos; Attendance: 2,750; Referee: Michael Bacher (Germany) |

| 28 July 2024 Friendly | 1. FC Düren | 1–1 | Bayern Munich | Jülich, Germany |
| 15:30 CEST | García 40' | Report | Irankunda 69' | Stadium: Karl-Knipprath-Stadion; Attendance: 9,500; Referee: David-Markus Koj (Germany) |

| 3 August 2024 Coupang Play Series | Bayern Munich | 2–1 | Tottenham Hotspur | Seoul, South Korea |
| 20:00 KST | Vidović 4'; Goretzka (yellow card) 50', (goal) 56' | Report | Spence (yellow card) 42'; Porro 65' | Stadium: Seoul World Cup Stadium; Attendance: 63,496; Referee: Kim Dae-yong (South Korea) |

| 10 August 2024 Visit Malta Cup | Tottenham Hotspur | 2–3 | Bayern Munich | London, England |
| 17:30 BST | Kulusevski 1', 61'; Drăgușin (yellow card) 44'; Lankshear (yellow card) 90+2' | Report | Upamecano 16'; Gnabry 31'; Müller 44'; Dier (yellow card) 77'; Coman (yellow card) 90+3' | Stadium: Tottenham Hotspur Stadium; Attendance: 61,084; Referee: Chris Kavanagh (England) |

| 13 August 2024 Friendly | Bayern Munich | 3–0 | WSG Tirol | Unterhaching, Germany |
| 18:00 CEST | Kane 4'; Palhinha 48'; Vidović 81' | Report | | Stadium: Sportpark Unterhaching; Attendance: 9,531; Referee: Felix Brych (Germany) |

| 20 August 2024 Friendly | Bayern Munich | 4–0 | Grasshopper | Munich, Germany |
| 11:30 CEST | Olise 12'; Kane 47'; Tel 68'; Müller 90+1' | Report | | Stadium: FC Bayern Campus; Attendance: 2,500; Referee: Michael Bacher (Germany) |

| 6 January 2025 Friendly | Bayern Munich | Cancelled | Greuther Fürth | Munich, Germany |
| 11:30 CET | | | | Stadium: FC Bayern Campus |
Note: Bayern Munich made alterations to their plans for the winter break due to the impact of injuries on the squad and the need to manage workloads. As a result, the scheduled friendly match against Greuther Fürth was cancelled.

| 6 January 2025 Friendly | Red Bull Salzburg | 0–6 | Bayern Munich | Salzburg, Austria |
| 18:00 CET | | Report | Dier 10'; Müller 25'; Olise 29', 49'; Kimmich 56'; Asp Jensen 77' | Stadium: Red Bull Arena; Attendance: 26,107; Referee: Markus Hameter (Austria) |

== Competitions ==
=== Overall record ===
| Competition | First match | Last match | Starting round | Final position | Record | | | | | | | |
| Competition | First match | Last match | Starting round | Final position | Pld | W | D | L | GF | GA | GD | Win % |
|---|---|---|---|---|---|---|---|---|---|---|---|---|
| Bundesliga | 25 August 2024 | 17 May 2025 | Matchday 1 | Winners | 34 | 25 | 7 | 2 | 99 | 32 | +67 | 73.53 |
| DFB-Pokal | 16 August 2024 | 3 December 2024 | First round | Round of 16 | 3 | 2 | 0 | 1 | 8 | 1 | +7 | 66.67 |
| UEFA Champions League | 17 September 2024 | 16 April 2025 | League phase | Quarter-finals | 14 | 8 | 2 | 4 | 31 | 18 | +13 | 57.14 |
| FIFA Club World Cup | 15 June 2025 | 5 July 2025 | Group stage | Quarter-finals | 5 | 3 | 0 | 2 | 16 | 6 | +10 | 60.00 |
| Total | | | | | 56 | 38 | 9 | 9 | 154 | 57 | +97 | 67.86 |

Source: Soccerway

=== Bundesliga ===
==== League table ====
| Pos | Team | Pld | W | D | L | GF | GA | GD | Pts | Qualification or relegation |
|---|---|---|---|---|---|---|---|---|---|---|
| 1 | Bayern Munich (C) | 34 | 25 | 7 | 2 | 99 | 32 | +67 | 82 | Qualification for the Champions League league phase |
| 2 | Bayer Leverkusen | 34 | 19 | 12 | 3 | 72 | 43 | +29 | 69 | Qualification for the Champions League league phase |
| 3 | Eintracht Frankfurt | 34 | 17 | 9 | 8 | 68 | 46 | +22 | 60 | Qualification for the Champions League league phase |
| 4 | Borussia Dortmund | 34 | 17 | 6 | 11 | 71 | 51 | +20 | 57 | Qualification for the Champions League league phase |
| 5 | SC Freiburg | 34 | 16 | 7 | 11 | 49 | 53 | −4 | 55 | Qualification for the Europa League league phase |

Source: Bundesliga
Rules for classification: 1) Points; 2) Goal difference; 3) Goals scored; 4) Head-to-head results; 5) Head-to-head away goals scored; 6) Away goals scored; 7) Play-off.
(Rules 4–6 only apply after home and away matches have been played between the tied teams.)
(C) Champions

==== Results summary ====
| Overall | | | | | | | | Home | | | | | | Away | | | | | |
| Pld | W | D | L | GF | GA | GD | Pts | W | D | L | GF | GA | GD | W | D | L | GF | GA | GD |
|---|---|---|---|---|---|---|---|---|---|---|---|---|---|---|---|---|---|---|---|
| 34 | 25 | 7 | 2 | 99 | 32 | +67 | 82 | 14 | 2 | 1 | 53 | 16 | +37 | 11 | 5 | 1 | 46 | 16 | +30 |

Source: kicker.de

==== Results by round ====
| Round | 1 | 2 | 3 | 4 | 5 | 6 | 7 | 8 | 9 | 10 | 11 | 12 | 13 | 14 | 15 | 16 | 17 | 18 | 19 | 20 | 21 | 22 | 23 | 24 | 25 | 26 | 27 | 28 | 29 | 30 | 31 | 32 | 33 | 34 |
|---|---|---|---|---|---|---|---|---|---|---|---|---|---|---|---|---|---|---|---|---|---|---|---|---|---|---|---|---|---|---|---|---|---|---|
| Ground | A | H | A | A | H | A | H | A | H | A | H | A | H | A | H | A | H | H | A | H | H | A | H | A | H | A | H | A | H | A | H | A | H | A |
| Result | W | W | W | W | D | D | W | W | W | W | W | D | W | L | W | W | W | W | W | W | W | D | W | W | L | D | W | W | D | W | W | D | W | W |
| Position | 4 | 2 | 1 | 1 | 1 | 1 | 1 | 1 | 1 | 1 | 1 | 1 | 1 | 1 | 1 | 1 | 1 | 1 | 1 | 1 | 1 | 1 | 1 | 1 | 1 | 1 | 1 | 1 | 1 | 1 | 1 | 1 | 1 | 1 |
| Points | 3 | 6 | 9 | 12 | 13 | 14 | 17 | 20 | 23 | 26 | 29 | 30 | 33 | 33 | 36 | 39 | 42 | 45 | 48 | 51 | 54 | 55 | 58 | 61 | 61 | 62 | 65 | 68 | 69 | 72 | 75 | 76 | 79 | 82 |

Source: Bundesliga
A = Away; H = Home; W = Win; D = Draw; L = Loss

==== Matches ====
The league fixtures were announced on 4 July 2024.

| 25 August 2024 1 | VfL Wolfsburg | 2–3 | Bayern Munich | Wolfsburg |
| 15:30 CEST | Majer 47' (pen.), 55'; Svanberg (yellow card) 71'; Zesiger (yellow card) 82' | Report | Musiala 20', (yellow card) 70'; Kane (yellow card) 31'; Boey (yellow card) 46'; Kamiński 65' (o.g.); Gnabry 82' | Stadium: Volkswagen Arena; Attendance: 30,000; Referee: Daniel Siebert |

| 1 September 2024 2 | Bayern Munich | 2–0 | SC Freiburg | Munich |
| 17:30 CEST | Upamecano (yellow card) 31'; Kane 38' (pen.); Müller 78' | Report | Höler (penalty missed) 90+6' | Stadium: Allianz Arena; Attendance: 75,000; Referee: Christian Dingert |

| 14 September 2024 3 | Holstein Kiel | 1–6 | Bayern Munich | Kiel |
| 18:30 CEST | Gigović 82'; Bremser (yellow card) 89' | Report | Musiala 1'; Kane 7', 43', 90+1' (pen.); Remberg 13' (o.g.); Olise 65'; Palhinha (yellow card) 81' | Stadium: Holstein-Stadion; Attendance: 15,034; Referee: Tobias Reichel |

| 21 September 2024 4 | Werder Bremen | 0–5 | Bayern Munich | Bremen |
| 15:30 CEST | | Report | Olise 23', 60'; Musiala 32'; Laimer (yellow card) 38'; Kane 57'; Gnabry 65'; Pavlović (yellow card) 68'; Upamecano (yellow card) 77' | Stadium: Weserstadion; Attendance: 42,100; Referee: Bastian Dankert |

| 28 September 2024 5 | Bayern Munich | 1–1 | Bayer Leverkusen | Munich |
| 18:30 CEST | Upamecano (yellow card) 23'; Pavlović 39' | Report | Andrich 31', (yellow card) 32'; Wirtz (yellow card) 57'; Grimaldo (yellow card) 71' | Stadium: Allianz Arena; Attendance: 75,000; Referee: Felix Zwayer |

| 6 October 2024 6 | Eintracht Frankfurt | 3–3 | Bayern Munich | Frankfurt |
| 17:30 CEST | Marmoush 22', 90+4', (yellow card) 90+5'; Ekitike 35' | Report | Kim 15'; Upamecano 38'; Müller (yellow card) 43'; Olise 53' | Stadium: Deutsche Bank Park; Attendance: 58,000; Referee: Benjamin Brand |

| 19 October 2024 7 | Bayern Munich | 4–0 | VfB Stuttgart | Munich |
| 18:30 CEST | Kane 57', 60', 80'; Coman 89' | Report | Undav (yellow card) 53'; Leweling (yellow card) 69' | Stadium: Allianz Arena; Attendance: 75,000; Referee: Tobias Stieler |

| 27 October 2024 8 | VfL Bochum | 0–5 | Bayern Munich | Bochum |
| 15:30 CET | Passlack (yellow card) 12' | Report | Olise 16'; Musiala 26', (yellow card) 45+1'; Kane 57'; Sané 65'; Coman 71' | Stadium: Vonovia Ruhrstadion; Attendance: 26,000; Referee: Florian Exner |

| 2 November 2024 9 | Bayern Munich | 3–0 | Union Berlin | Munich |
| 15:30 CET | Kane 15' (pen.), 51'; Coman 43' | Report | Kemlein (yellow card) 31'; Khedira (yellow card) 84' | Stadium: Allianz Arena; Attendance: 75,000; Referee: Matthias Jöllenbeck |

| 9 November 2024 10 | FC St. Pauli | 0–1 | Bayern Munich | Hamburg |
| 15:30 CET | Guilavogui (yellow card) 64'; Saliakas (yellow card) 66' | Report | Musiala 22'; Kim (yellow card) 66'; Laimer (yellow card) 90+2' | Stadium: Millerntor-Stadion; Attendance: 29,546; Referee: Timo Gerach |

| 22 November 2024 11 | Bayern Munich | 3–0 | FC Augsburg | Munich |
| 20:30 CET | Kane 63' (pen.), 90+3' (pen.), 90+5' | Report | Schlotterbeck (yellow card) 47' (yellow-red card) 90+3' | Stadium: Allianz Arena; Attendance: 75,000; Referee: Daniel Schlager |

| 30 November 2024 12 | Borussia Dortmund | 1–1 | Bayern Munich | Dortmund |
| 18:30 CET | Gittens 27'; Ryerson (yellow card) 71'; Beier (yellow card) 90+5' | Report | Musiala 85'; Sané (yellow card) 88'; Upamecano (yellow card) 90+3' | Stadium: Signal Iduna Park; Attendance: 81,365; Referee: Sven Jablonski |

| 7 December 2024 13 | Bayern Munich | 4–2 | 1. FC Heidenheim | Munich |
| 15:30 CET | Upamecano 18'; Musiala 56', 90+1'; Goretzka 84'; Peretz (yellow card) 87' | Report | Honsak 50'; Dorsch 85' | Stadium: Allianz Arena; Attendance: 75,000; Referee: Sören Storks |

| 14 December 2024 14 | Mainz 05 | 2–1 | Bayern Munich | Mainz |
| 15:30 CET | Lee 41', 60'; Kohr (yellow card) 49'; Mwene (yellow card) 90'; Amiri (yellow card) 90+6' | Report | Kimmich (yellow card) 78'; Sané 87'; Laimer (yellow card) 90+5' | Stadium: Mewa Arena; Attendance: 33,305; Referee: Frank Willenborg |

| 20 December 2024 15 | Bayern Munich | 5–1 | RB Leipzig | Munich |
| 20:30 CET | Musiala 1'; Upamecano (yellow card) 20'; Laimer 25', (yellow card) 64'; Kimmich 36', (yellow card) 82'; Olise (yellow card) 56'; Kane (yellow card) 60'; Sané 75'; Davies 78' | Report | Šeško 2'; Schlager (yellow card) 26'; Henrichs (yellow card) 59' | Stadium: Allianz Arena; Attendance: 75,000; Referee: Daniel Siebert |

| 11 January 2025 16 | Borussia Mönchengladbach | 0–1 | Bayern Munich | Mönchengladbach |
| 18:30 CET | Scally (yellow card) 53'; Ullrich (yellow card) 66'; Weigl (yellow card) 90+1' | Report | Kane 68' (pen.); Kim (yellow card) 82' | Stadium: Borussia-Park; Attendance: 54,042; Referee: Felix Zwayer |

| 15 January 2025 17 | Bayern Munich | 5–0 | TSG Hoffenheim | Munich |
| 20:30 CET | Sané 7', 48'; Guerreiro 12'; Kane 26' (pen.); Müller (yellow card) 61'; Gnabry 66' | Report | Kadeřábek (yellow card) 87' | Stadium: Allianz Arena; Attendance: 75,000; Referee: Timo Gerach |

| 18 January 2025 18 | Bayern Munich | 3–2 | VfL Wolfsburg | Munich |
| 15:30 CET | Goretzka 20', 62'; Olise 39'; Kimmich (yellow card) 79'; Laimer (yellow card) 84' | Report | Amoura 24', 88'; Mæhle (yellow card) 45+2'; Wimmer (yellow card) 61'; Fischer (yellow card) 90+5' | Stadium: Allianz Arena; Attendance: 75,000; Referee: Tobias Reichel |

| 25 January 2025 19 | SC Freiburg | 1–2 | Bayern Munich | Freiburg |
| 15:30 CET | Kübler (yellow card) 52'; Atubolu (yellow card) 54'; Ginter 68'; Doan (yellow card) 76'; Grifo (yellow card) 90+2' | Report | Kane 15', (yellow card) 63'; Kim 54'; Müller (yellow card) 90+3' | Stadium: Europa-Park Stadion; Attendance: 34,700; Referee: Daniel Siebert |

| 1 February 2025 20 | Bayern Munich | 4–3 | Holstein Kiel | Munich |
| 15:30 CET | Musiala 19'; Kane 45+3', 46'; Gnabry 54'; Laimer (yellow card) 78' | Report | Porath 62'; Zec (yellow card) 81'; Skrzybski 90+1', 90+3' | Stadium: Allianz Arena; Attendance: 75,000; Referee: Florian Exner |

| 7 February 2025 21 | Bayern Munich | 3–0 | Werder Bremen | Munich |
| 20:30 CET | Kane 56' (pen.), 90+7' (pen.); Sané 82'; Goretzka (yellow card) 84' | Report | Jung (yellow card) 54'; Weiser (yellow card) 54'; Silva (yellow card) 62' | Stadium: Allianz Arena; Attendance: 75,000; Referee: Sören Storks |

| 15 February 2025 22 | Bayer Leverkusen | 0–0 | Bayern Munich | Leverkusen |
| 18:30 CET | Hincapié (yellow card) 11'; Tapsoba (yellow card) 90+4' | Report | Itō (yellow card) 39'; Pavlović (yellow card) 53'; Upamecano (yellow card) 74' | Stadium: BayArena; Attendance: 30,210; Referee: Daniel Siebert |

| 23 February 2025 23 | Bayern Munich | 4–0 | Eintracht Frankfurt | Munich |
| 17:30 CET | Olise 45+3'; Itō 61'; Sané (yellow card) 77'; Musiala 83'; Gnabry 90+2' | Report | Tuta (yellow card) 80' | Stadium: Allianz Arena; Attendance: 75,000; Referee: Sascha Stegemann |

| 28 February 2025 24 | VfB Stuttgart | 1–3 | Bayern Munich | Stuttgart |
| 20:30 CET | Stiller 34'; Jeltsch (yellow card) 39'; Chabot (yellow card) 42'; Führich (yellow card) 48'; Millot (yellow card) 90+3'; Demirović (yellow card) 90+7' | Report | Olise 45'; Laimer (yellow card) 59'; Goretzka 64', (yellow card) 66'; Coman 90'; Kane (yellow card) 90+3' | Stadium: MHPArena; Attendance: 60,000; Referee: Benjamin Brand |

| 8 March 2025 25 | Bayern Munich | 2–3 | VfL Bochum | Munich |
| 15:30 CET | Guerreiro 14', 28'; Gnabry (penalty missed) 22'; Palhinha (red card) 43' | Report | Medić (yellow card) 21', (goal) 31'; Sissoko 51', (yellow card) 87'; Bernardo (yellow card) 57'; Bero 71'; Wittek (yellow card) 73'; Horn (yellow card) 80'; Losilla (yellow card) 90+4' | Stadium: Allianz Arena; Attendance: 75,000; Referee: Christian Dingert |

| 15 March 2025 26 | Union Berlin | 1–1 | Bayern Munich | Berlin |
| 15:30 CET | Juranović (yellow card) 58'; Hollerbach 83'; Rothe (yellow card) 90+1' | Report | Musiala (yellow card) 53'; Sané 75'; Kimmich (yellow card) 80' | Stadium: Stadion An der Alten Försterei; Attendance: 22,012; Referee: Florian Exner |

| 29 March 2025 27 | Bayern Munich | 3–2 | FC St. Pauli | Munich |
| 15:30 CET | Guerreiro (yellow card) 13'; Kane 17'; Olise (yellow card) 45+4'; Palhinha (yellow card) 51'; Sané 53', 71' | Report | Saad 27'; Ritzka 90+3' | Stadium: Allianz Arena; Attendance: 75,000; Referee: Florian Badstübner |

| 4 April 2025 28 | FC Augsburg | 1–3 | Bayern Munich | Augsburg |
| 20:30 CEST | Giannoulis 30'; Zesiger (yellow card) 32' (yellow-red card) 59'; Claude-Maurice (yellow card) 45+1'; Gouweleeuw (yellow card) 84' | Report | Musiala 42'; Kane 60'; Matsima 90+3' (o.g.) | Stadium: WWK Arena; Attendance: 30,660; Referee: Matthias Jöllenbeck |

| 12 April 2025 29 | Bayern Munich | 2–2 | Borussia Dortmund | Munich |
| 18:30 CEST | Guerreiro 65'; Gnabry 69' | Report | Beier 49'; Anton 75' | Stadium: Allianz Arena; Attendance: 75,000; Referee: Tobias Welz |

| 19 April 2025 30 | 1. FC Heidenheim | 0–4 | Bayern Munich | Heidenheim |
| 15:30 CEST | Gimber (yellow card) 35'; Dorsch (yellow card) 41'; Schöppner (yellow card) 43' | Report | Kane 13'; Laimer 19'; Coman 36'; Kimmich 56'; Guerreiro (yellow card) 80' | Stadium: Voith-Arena; Attendance: 15,000; Referee: Frank Willenborg |

| 26 April 2025 31 | Bayern Munich | 3–0 | Mainz 05 | Munich |
| 15:30 CEST | Sané 27'; Olise 40'; Kane (yellow card) 45+1'; Dier 84'; Laimer (yellow card) 86' | Report | Mwene (yellow card) 36'; Amiri (yellow card) 89' | Stadium: Allianz Arena; Attendance: 75,000; Referee: Bastian Dankert |

| 3 May 2025 32 | RB Leipzig | 3–3 | Bayern Munich | Leipzig |
| 15:30 CEST | Šeško 11'; Klostermann 39'; Raum (yellow card) 50'; Kampl (yellow card) 78'; Vermeeren (yellow card) 90'; Poulsen 90+5' | Report | Dier 62', (yellow card) 74'; Olise 63'; Sané 83' | Stadium: Red Bull Arena; Attendance: 47,800; Referee: Felix Zwayer |

| 10 May 2025 33 | Bayern Munich | 2–0 | Borussia Mönchengladbach | Munich |
| 18:30 CEST | Kane 31'; Olise 90', (yellow card) 90+2' | Report | Weigl (yellow card) 49' | Stadium: Allianz Arena; Attendance: 75,000; Referee: Sven Jablonski |

| 17 May 2025 34 | TSG Hoffenheim | 0–4 | Bayern Munich | Sinsheim |
| 15:30 CEST | | Report | Olise 33'; Kimmich 53'; Gnabry 80'; Kane 86' | Stadium: PreZero Arena; Attendance: 30,150; Referee: Daniel Schlager |

=== DFB-Pokal ===
The first round draw was held on 1 June 2024.

| 16 August 2024 First round | SSV Ulm | 0–4 | Bayern Munich | Ulm |
| 20:45 CEST | Hyryläinen (yellow card) 29'; Reichert (yellow card) 45' | Report | Müller 12', 14'; Kimmich (yellow card) 74'; Coman 79'; Kane 90+3' | Stadium: Donaustadion; Attendance: 17,400; Referee: Sven Jablonski |

| 30 October 2024 Second round | Mainz 05 | 0–4 | Bayern Munich | Mainz |
| 20:45 CET | Kohr (yellow card) 19'; Jenz (yellow card) 45+3'; Nebel (yellow card) 64' | Report | Musiala 2', 37', 45+4'; Laimer (yellow card) 43'; Sané 45+1' | Stadium: Mewa Arena; Attendance: 33,305; Referee: Sascha Stegemann |

| 3 December 2024 Round of 16 | Bayern Munich | 0–1 | Bayer Leverkusen | Munich |
| 20:45 CET | Upamecano (yellow card) 13'; Neuer (red card) 17'; Goretzka (yellow card) 52' | Report | Tapsoba (yellow card) 13'; Wirtz (yellow card) 22'; Tella 69'; Kovář (yellow card) 78' | Stadium: Allianz Arena; Attendance: 75,000; Referee: Harm Osmers |

=== UEFA Champions League ===
==== League phase ====
The league phase draw was held on 29 August 2024. The fixture list was announced on 31 August 2024.

| Pos | Team | Pld | W | D | L | GF | GA | GD | Pts | Qualification |
|---|---|---|---|---|---|---|---|---|---|---|
| 10 | (German Football Association) Borussia Dortmund | 8 | 5 | 0 | 3 | 22 | 12 | +10 | 15 | Advance to knockout phase play-offs (seeded) |
| 11 | (Royal Spanish Football Federation) Real Madrid | 8 | 5 | 0 | 3 | 20 | 12 | +8 | 15 (Note: Tied on points (15), goal difference (+8), goals scored (20), away goals (6) and wins (5). Ranked on away wins: Real Madrid 2, Bayern Munich 1.) | Advance to knockout phase play-offs (seeded) |
| 12 | (German Football Association) Bayern Munich | 8 | 5 | 0 | 3 | 20 | 12 | +8 | 15 | Advance to knockout phase play-offs (seeded) |
| 13 | (Italian Football Federation) Milan | 8 | 5 | 0 | 3 | 14 | 11 | +3 | 15 | Advance to knockout phase play-offs (seeded) |
| 14 | (Royal Dutch Football Association) PSV Eindhoven | 8 | 4 | 2 | 2 | 16 | 12 | +4 | 14 | Advance to knockout phase play-offs (seeded) |

Source: UEFA
Rules for classification: League phase tiebreakers
Notes:

| Round | 1 | 2 | 3 | 4 | 5 | 6 | 7 | 8 |
|---|---|---|---|---|---|---|---|---|
| Ground | H | A | A | H | H | A | A | H |
| Result | W | L | L | W | W | W | L | W |
| Position | 1 | 15 | 23 | 17 | 13 | 10 | 15 | 12 |
| Points | 3 | 3 | 3 | 6 | 9 | 12 | 12 | 15 |

Source: UEFA
A = Away; H = Home; W = Win; D = Draw; L = Loss

| 17 September 2024 1 | Bayern Munich (Germany) | 9–2 | (Croatia) Dinamo Zagreb | Munich, Germany |
| 21:00 CEST | Kane 19' (pen.), 57', 73' (pen.), 78' (pen.); Guerreiro 33'; Olise 38', 61'; Sané 85'; Goretzka 90+2' | Report | Petković 49'; Ogiwara 50'; Ristovski (yellow card) 77' | Stadium: Allianz Arena; Attendance: 75,000; Referee: Juan Martínez Munuera (Spain) |

| 2 October 2024 2 | Aston Villa (England) | 1–0 | (Germany) Bayern Munich | Birmingham, England |
| 20:00 BST | Durán 79', (yellow card) 90+5'; Maatsen (yellow card) 90+1'; Diego Carlos (yellow card) 90+4' | Report | Upamecano (yellow card) 21'; Gnabry (yellow card) 66' | Stadium: Villa Park; Attendance: 38,991; Referee: Radu Petrescu (Romania) |

| 23 October 2024 3 | Barcelona (Spain) | 4–1 | (Germany) Bayern Munich | Barcelona, Spain |
| 21:00 CEST | Raphinha 1', 45', 56'; Lewandowski 36' | Report | Kane 18'; Kimmich (yellow card) 27'; Goretzka (yellow card) 90' | Stadium: Estadi Olímpic Lluís Companys; Attendance: 50,312; Referee: Slavko Vinčić (Slovenia) |
Note: The match was played at the Estadi Olímpic Lluís Companys in Barcelona, instead of Barcelona's regular stadium, the Camp Nou, which was being renovated.

| 6 November 2024 4 | Bayern Munich (Germany) | 1–0 | (Portugal) Benfica | Munich, Germany |
| 21:00 CET | Musiala 67', (yellow card) 73' | Report | Kaboré (yellow card) 26'; Kökçü (yellow card) 71' | Stadium: Allianz Arena; Attendance: 75,000; Referee: Davide Massa (Italy) |

| 26 November 2024 5 | Bayern Munich (Germany) | 1–0 | (France) Paris Saint-Germain | Munich, Germany |
| 21:00 CET | Kim 38'; Coman (yellow card) 67'; Olise (yellow card) 77'; Gnabry (yellow card) 84' | Report | Dembélé (yellow card) 37' (yellow-red card) 57'; Hakimi (yellow card) 57'; Mendes (yellow card) 71'; Fabián (yellow card) 90+5' | Stadium: Allianz Arena; Attendance: 75,000; Referee: István Kovács (Romania) |

| 10 December 2024 6 | Shakhtar Donetsk (Ukraine) | 1–5 | (Germany) Bayern Munich | Gelsenkirchen, Germany |
| 21:00 CET | Kevin 5'; Kryskiv (yellow card) 55'; Traoré (yellow card) 82' | Report | Sané (yellow card) 7'; Laimer 11'; Müller 45'; Olise 70' (pen.), 90+3'; Goretzka (yellow card) 82'; Musiala 87' | Stadium: Arena AufSchalke; Attendance: 57,079; Referee: Halil Umut Meler (Turkey) |
Note: Due to the Russian invasion of Ukraine, Shakhtar Donetsk were required to play their home matches at neutral venues until further notice.

| 22 January 2025 7 | Feyenoord (Netherlands) | 3–0 | (Germany) Bayern Munich | Rotterdam, Netherlands |
| 21:00 CET | Hancko (yellow card) 19'; Giménez 21', 45+9' (pen.); Ueda 89' | Report | Sané (yellow card) 87'; Goretzka (yellow card) 89'; Müller (yellow card) 89'; Ulreich (yellow card) 90' | Stadium: De Kuip; Attendance: 43,106; Referee: François Letexier (France) |

| 29 January 2025 8 | Bayern Munich (Germany) | 3–1 | (Slovakia) Slovan Bratislava | Munich, Germany |
| 21:00 CET | Müller 8'; Kane 63'; Coman 84' | Report | Blackman (yellow card) 32'; Bajrić (yellow card) 81'; Savvidis (yellow card) 81'; Tolić 90' | Stadium: Allianz Arena; Attendance: 75,000; Referee: João Pinheiro (Portugal) |

==== Knockout phase ====
===== Knockout phase play-offs =====
The draw for the knockout phase play-offs was held on 31 January 2025.

| 12 February 2025 First leg | Celtic (Scotland) | 1–2 | (Germany) Bayern Munich | Glasgow, Scotland |
| 20:00 GMT | Maeda 79' | Report | Olise 45'; Kane 49' | Stadium: Celtic Park; Attendance: 57,406; Referee: Jesús Gil Manzano (Spain) |

| 18 February 2025 Second leg | Bayern Munich (Germany) | 1–1 (3–2 agg.) | (Scotland) Celtic | Munich, Germany |
| 21:00 CET | Davies 90+4' | Report | Kühn 63' | Stadium: Allianz Arena; Attendance: 75,000; Referee: Benoît Bastien (France) |

===== Round of 16 =====
The draw for the round of 16 was held on 21 February 2025.

| 5 March 2025 First leg | Bayern Munich (Germany) | 3–0 | (Germany) Bayer Leverkusen | Munich, Germany |
| 21:00 CET | Kane 9', 75' (pen.); Laimer (yellow card) 39'; Goretzka (yellow card) 51'; Musiala 54' | Report | Mukiele (yellow card) 39' (yellow-red card) 62'; Tapsoba (yellow card) 73'; Tah (yellow card) 74' | Stadium: Allianz Arena; Attendance: 75,000; Referee: Michael Oliver (England) |

| 11 March 2025 Second leg | Bayer Leverkusen (Germany) | 0–2 (0–5 agg.) | (Germany) Bayern Munich | Leverkusen, Germany |
| 21:00 CET | Hermoso (yellow card) 31'; Xhaka (yellow card) 51'; Schick (yellow card) 70'; Buendía (yellow card) 86' | Report | Laimer (yellow card) 8'; Coman (yellow card) 10'; Kane 52', (yellow card) 82'; Davies 71' | Stadium: BayArena; Attendance: 30,210; Referee: Slavko Vinčić (Slovenia) |

===== Quarter-finals =====
The draw for the order of the quarter-final legs was held on 21 February 2025, after the draw for the round of 16.

| 8 April 2025 First leg | Bayern Munich (Germany) | 1–2 | (Italy) Inter Milan | Munich, Germany |
| 21:00 CEST | Kim (yellow card) 28'; Müller 85' | Report | L. Martínez 38', (yellow card) 53'; Mkhitaryan (yellow card) 71'; Frattesi 88', (yellow card) 89'; Zalewski (yellow card) 90+4' | Stadium: Allianz Arena; Attendance: 75,000; Referee: Sandro Schärer (Switzerland) |

| 16 April 2025 Second leg | Inter Milan (Italy) | 2–2 (4–3 agg.) | (Germany) Bayern Munich | Milan, Italy |
| 21:00 CEST | L. Martínez 58'; Pavard 61'; Arnautović (yellow card) 69'; Dimarco (yellow card) 90+6' | Report | Kim (yellow card) 28'; Dier (yellow card) 45', (goal) 76'; Kane 52' | Stadium: San Siro; Attendance: 75,625; Referee: Slavko Vinčić (Slovenia) |

=== FIFA Club World Cup ===
Bayern qualified for the tournament via their four-year UEFA club ranking between 2021 and 2024.

==== Group stage ====
The draw for the group stage was held on 5 December 2024.

| Pos | Team | Pld | W | D | L | GF | GA | GD | Pts | Qualification |
|---|---|---|---|---|---|---|---|---|---|---|
| 1 | (Portugal) Benfica | 3 | 2 | 1 | 0 | 9 | 2 | +7 | 7 | Advance to knockout stage |
| 2 | (Germany) Bayern Munich | 3 | 2 | 0 | 1 | 12 | 2 | +10 | 6 | Advance to knockout stage |
| 3 | (Argentina) Boca Juniors | 3 | 0 | 2 | 1 | 4 | 5 | −1 | 2 | |
| 4 | (New Zealand) Auckland City | 3 | 0 | 1 | 2 | 1 | 17 | −16 | 1 | |

Source: FIFA
Rules for classification: Group stage tiebreakers

| 15 June 2025 1 | Bayern Munich (Germany) | 10–0 | (New Zealand) Auckland City | Cincinnati, United States |
| 12:00 EDT | Coman 6', 21'; Boey 18'; Olise 20', 45+3'; Müller 45', 89'; Musiala 67', 73' (pen.), 84' | Report | | Stadium: TQL Stadium; Attendance: 21,152; Referee: Issa Sy (Senegal) |

| 20 June 2025 2 | Bayern Munich (Germany) | 2–1 | (Argentina) Boca Juniors | Miami Gardens, United States |
| 21:00 EDT | Kane 18'; Goretzka (yellow card) 45+3'; Olise 84' | Report | Rojo (yellow card) 15'; Advíncula (yellow card) 36'; Merentiel 66'; Di Lollo (yellow card) 71' | Stadium: Hard Rock Stadium; Attendance: 63,587; Referee: Alireza Faghani (Australia) |

| 24 June 2025 3 | Benfica (Portugal) | 1–0 | (Germany) Bayern Munich | Charlotte, United States |
| 15:00 EDT | Schjelderup 13'; Sanches (yellow card) 19'; Otamendi (yellow card) 46'; Gouveia (yellow card) 89' | Report | | Stadium: Bank of America Stadium; Attendance: 33,287; Referee: François Letexier (France) |

==== Knockout stage ====
| 29 June 2025 Round of 16 | Flamengo (Brazil) | 2–4 | (Germany) Bayern Munich | Miami Gardens, United States |
| 16:00 EDT | Gerson 33'; Pulgar (yellow card) 42'; Plata (yellow card) 44'; Allan (yellow card) 45+3'; Jorginho 55' (pen.); Wesley (yellow card) 63' | Report | Pulgar 6' (o.g.); Kane 9', 73', (yellow card) 83'; Goretzka 41'; Tah (yellow card) 44'; Kimmich (yellow card) 66'; Musiala (yellow card) 87'; Laimer (yellow card) 90+1' | Stadium: Hard Rock Stadium; Attendance: 60,914; Referee: Michael Oliver (England) |

| 5 July 2025 Quarter-finals | Paris Saint-Germain (France) | 2–0 | (Germany) Bayern Munich | Atlanta, United States |
| 12:00 EDT | Doué (yellow card) 76', (goal) 78'; Pacho (red card) 82'; Hernandez (red card) 90+2'; Dembélé 90+6' | Report | Laimer (yellow card) 68' | Stadium: Mercedes-Benz Stadium; Attendance: 66,937; Referee: Anthony Taylor (England) |

== Statistics ==
=== Appearances and goals ===
| No. | Pos | Nat | Player | Total | | Bundesliga | | DFB-Pokal | | Champions League | | Club World Cup | |
| No. | Pos | Nat | Player | Apps | Goals | Apps | Goals | Apps | Goals | Apps | Goals | Apps | Goals |
Goalkeepers
| 1 | GK | (Germany) GER | Manuel Neuer | 40 | 0 | 22 | 0 | 3 | 0 | 10 | 0 | 5 | 0 |
| 18 | GK | (Israel) ISR | Daniel Peretz | 5 | 0 | 3 | 0 | 0+1 | 0 | 1 | 0 | 0 | 0 |
| 26 | GK | (Germany) GER | Sven Ulreich | 2 | 0 | 1 | 0 | 0 | 0 | 0+1 | 0 | 0 | 0 |
| 35 | GK | (Germany) GER | Max Schmitt | 0 | 0 | 0 | 0 | 0 | 0 | 0 | 0 | 0 | 0 |
| 37 | GK | (Australia) AUS | Anthony Pavlešić | 0 | 0 | 0 | 0 | 0 | 0 | 0 | 0 | 0 | 0 |
| 40 | GK | (Germany) GER | Jonas Urbig | 12 | 0 | 8 | 0 | 0 | 0 | 3+1 | 0 | 0 | 0 |
| 48 | GK | (Germany) GER | Leon Klanac | 0 | 0 | 0 | 0 | 0 | 0 | 0 | 0 | 0 | 0 |
Defenders
| 2 | DF | (France) FRA | Dayot Upamecano | 38 | 2 | 20 | 2 | 2 | 0 | 11 | 0 | 3+2 | 0 |
| 3 | DF | (South Korea) KOR | Kim Min-jae | 43 | 3 | 27 | 2 | 3 | 0 | 13 | 1 | 0 | 0 |
| 4 | DF | (Germany) GER | Jonathan Tah | 5 | 0 | 0 | 0 | 0 | 0 | 0 | 0 | 4+1 | 0 |
| 15 | DF | (England) ENG | Eric Dier | 28 | 3 | 16+5 | 2 | 1 | 0 | 3+3 | 1 | 0 | 0 |
| 19 | DF | (Canada) CAN | Alphonso Davies | 31 | 3 | 17+2 | 1 | 2+1 | 0 | 8+1 | 2 | 0 | 0 |
| 21 | DF | (Japan) JPN | Hiroki Itō | 8 | 1 | 3+3 | 1 | 0 | 0 | 0+2 | 0 | 0 | 0 |
| 22 | DF | (Portugal) POR | Raphaël Guerreiro | 38 | 5 | 19+4 | 4 | 1+1 | 0 | 6+3 | 1 | 3+1 | 0 |
| 23 | DF | (France) FRA | Sacha Boey | 21 | 1 | 6+7 | 0 | 0+1 | 0 | 1+2 | 0 | 2+2 | 1 |
| 28 | DF | (Germany) GER | Tarek Buchmann | 0 | 0 | 0 | 0 | 0 | 0 | 0 | 0 | 0 | 0 |
| 44 | DF | (Croatia) CRO | Josip Stanišić | 26 | 0 | 9+5 | 0 | 1 | 0 | 4+2 | 0 | 5 | 0 |
Midfielders
| 6 | MF | (Germany) GER | Joshua Kimmich | 55 | 3 | 32+1 | 3 | 3 | 0 | 14 | 0 | 4+1 | 0 |
| 8 | MF | (Germany) GER | Leon Goretzka | 43 | 6 | 13+13 | 4 | 1+1 | 0 | 9+3 | 1 | 2+1 | 1 |
| 16 | MF | (Portugal) POR | João Palhinha | 25 | 0 | 6+11 | 0 | 1+1 | 0 | 2+3 | 0 | 1 | 0 |
| 17 | MF | (France) FRA | Michael Olise | 55 | 20 | 28+6 | 12 | 1+1 | 0 | 13+1 | 5 | 4+1 | 3 |
| 20 | MF | (Germany) GER | Tom Bischof | 1 | 0 | 0 | 0 | 0 | 0 | 0 | 0 | 0+1 | 0 |
| 24 | MF | (Croatia) CRO | Gabriel Vidović | 4 | 0 | 0+4 | 0 | 0 | 0 | 0 | 0 | 0 | 0 |
| 27 | MF | (Austria) AUT | Konrad Laimer | 46 | 3 | 19+10 | 2 | 2 | 0 | 10+1 | 1 | 3+1 | 0 |
| 32 | MF | (Germany) GER | Adin Ličina | 0 | 0 | 0 | 0 | 0 | 0 | 0 | 0 | 0 | 0 |
| 33 | MF | (Spain) ESP | Javier Fernández | 0 | 0 | 0 | 0 | 0 | 0 | 0 | 0 | 0 | 0 |
| 42 | MF | (Germany) GER | Jamal Musiala | 44 | 21 | 21+4 | 12 | 3 | 3 | 9+3 | 3 | 1+3 | 3 |
| 43 | MF | (Denmark) DEN | Jonathan Asp Jensen | 0 | 0 | 0 | 0 | 0 | 0 | 0 | 0 | 0 | 0 |
| 45 | MF | (Germany) GER | Aleksandar Pavlović | 33 | 1 | 18+3 | 1 | 1+1 | 0 | 3+2 | 0 | 3+2 | 0 |
| 46 | MF | (Germany) GER | Lennart Karl | 1 | 0 | 0 | 0 | 0 | 0 | 0 | 0 | 0+1 | 0 |
Forwards
| 7 | FW | (Germany) GER | Serge Gnabry | 47 | 7 | 13+14 | 7 | 2+1 | 0 | 5+7 | 0 | 3+2 | 0 |
| 9 | FW | (England) ENG | Harry Kane | 51 | 41 | 28+3 | 26 | 1+1 | 1 | 13 | 11 | 4+1 | 3 |
| 10 | FW | (Germany) GER | Leroy Sané | 48 | 13 | 17+13 | 11 | 2 | 1 | 6+7 | 1 | 1+2 | 0 |
| 11 | FW | (France) FRA | Kingsley Coman | 45 | 9 | 14+14 | 5 | 1+1 | 1 | 5+6 | 1 | 4 | 2 |
| 25 | FW | (Germany) GER | Thomas Müller | 49 | 8 | 12+18 | 1 | 1+1 | 2 | 4+8 | 3 | 2+3 | 2 |
| 36 | FW | (Germany) GER | Wisdom Mike | 0 | 0 | 0 | 0 | 0 | 0 | 0 | 0 | 0 | 0 |
| 41 | FW | (Sweden) SWE | Jonah Kusi-Asare | 1 | 0 | 0+1 | 0 | 0 | 0 | 0 | 0 | 0 | 0 |
Players transferred/loaned out during the season
| 20 | MF | (Germany) GER | Arijon Ibrahimović | 3 | 0 | 0+1 | 0 | 0+1 | 0 | 0+1 | 0 | 0 | 0 |
| 31 | FW | (Australia) AUS | Nestory Irankunda | 0 | 0 | 0 | 0 | 0 | 0 | 0 | 0 | 0 | 0 |
| 35 | MF | (Germany) GER | Maurice Krattenmacher | 0 | 0 | 0 | 0 | 0 | 0 | 0 | 0 | 0 | 0 |
| 36 | MF | (Germany) GER | Noël Aséko Nkili | 0 | 0 | 0 | 0 | 0 | 0 | 0 | 0 | 0 | 0 |
| 39 | FW | (France) FRA | Mathys Tel | 14 | 0 | 2+6 | 0 | 1+2 | 0 | 1+2 | 0 | 0 | 0 |
| 49 | DF | (Morocco) MAR | Adam Aznou | 4 | 0 | 0+2 | 0 | 0 | 0 | 0+1 | 0 | 0+1 | 0 |

Source: Competitions

=== Goalscorers ===
| Rank | No. | Pos. | Nat. | Player | Bundesliga | DFB-Pokal | Champions League | Club World Cup | Total |
|---|---|---|---|---|---|---|---|---|---|
| 1 | 9 | FW | (England) | Harry Kane | 26 | 1 | 11 | 3 | 41 |
| 2 | 42 | MF | (Germany) | Jamal Musiala | 12 | 3 | 3 | 3 | 21 |
| 3 | 17 | MF | (France) | Michael Olise | 12 | 0 | 5 | 3 | 20 |
| 4 | 10 | FW | (Germany) | Leroy Sané | 11 | 1 | 1 | 0 | 13 |
| 5 | 11 | FW | (France) | Kingsley Coman | 5 | 1 | 1 | 2 | 9 |
| 6 | 25 | FW | (Germany) | Thomas Müller | 1 | 2 | 3 | 2 | 8 |
| 7 | 7 | FW | (Germany) | Serge Gnabry | 7 | 0 | 0 | 0 | 7 |
| 8 | 8 | MF | (Germany) | Leon Goretzka | 4 | 0 | 1 | 1 | 6 |
| 9 | 22 | DF | (Portugal) | Raphaël Guerreiro | 4 | 0 | 1 | 0 | 5 |
| 10 | 3 | DF | (South Korea) | Kim Min-jae | 2 | 0 | 1 | 0 | 3 |
| 10 | 19 | DF | (Canada) | Alphonso Davies | 1 | 0 | 2 | 0 | 3 |
| 10 | 27 | MF | (Austria) | Konrad Laimer | 2 | 0 | 1 | 0 | 3 |
| 10 | 15 | DF | (England) | Eric Dier | 2 | 0 | 1 | 0 | 3 |
| 10 | 6 | MF | (Germany) | Joshua Kimmich | 3 | 0 | 0 | 0 | 3 |
| 15 | 2 | DF | (France) | Dayot Upamecano | 2 | 0 | 0 | 0 | 2 |
| 16 | 45 | MF | (Germany) | Aleksandar Pavlović | 1 | 0 | 0 | 0 | 1 |
| 16 | 21 | DF | (Japan) | Hiroki Itō | 1 | 0 | 0 | 0 | 1 |
| 16 | 23 | DF | (France) | Sacha Boey | 0 | 0 | 0 | 1 | 1 |
| Own goals | | | | | 3 | 0 | 0 | 1 | 4 |
| Totals | | | | | 99 | 8 | 31 | 16 | 154 |

=== Assists ===
| Rank | No. | Pos. | Nat. | Player | Bundesliga | DFB-Pokal | Champions League | Club World Cup | Total |
|---|---|---|---|---|---|---|---|---|---|
| 1 | 17 | MF | (France) | Michael Olise | 15 | 1 | 2 | 2 | 20 |
| 2 | 9 | FW | (England) | Harry Kane | 8 | 1 | 2 | 1 | 12 |
| 3 | 6 | MF | (Germany) | Joshua Kimmich | 6 | 0 | 4 | 1 | 11 |
| 4 | 7 | FW | (Germany) | Serge Gnabry | 5 | 1 | 2 | 1 | 9 |
| 5 | 25 | FW | (Germany) | Thomas Müller | 4 | 1 | 1 | 1 | 7 |
| 6 | 11 | FW | (France) | Kingsley Coman | 4 | 0 | 0 | 2 | 6 |
| 7 | 42 | MF | (Germany) | Jamal Musiala | 2 | 0 | 3 | 0 | 5 |
| 7 | 10 | FW | (Germany) | Leroy Sané | 5 | 0 | 0 | 0 | 5 |
| 9 | 19 | DF | (Canada) | Alphonso Davies | 2 | 1 | 0 | 0 | 3 |
| 9 | 27 | MF | (Austria) | Konrad Laimer | 2 | 0 | 1 | 0 | 3 |
| 9 | 22 | DF | (Portugal) | Raphaël Guerreiro | 3 | 0 | 0 | 0 | 3 |
| 9 | 23 | DF | (France) | Sacha Boey | 2 | 0 | 0 | 1 | 3 |
| 13 | 44 | DF | (Croatia) | Josip Stanišić | 2 | 0 | 0 | 0 | 2 |
| 13 | 8 | MF | (Germany) | Leon Goretzka | 1 | 0 | 1 | 0 | 2 |
| 15 | 39 | FW | (France) | Mathys Tel | 1 | 0 | 0 | 0 | 1 |
| 15 | 15 | DF | (England) | Eric Dier | 1 | 0 | 0 | 0 | 1 |
| 15 | 4 | DF | (Germany) | Jonathan Tah | 0 | 0 | 0 | 1 | 1 |
| 15 | 2 | DF | (France) | Dayot Upamecano | 0 | 0 | 0 | 1 | 1 |
| Totals | | | | | 63 | 5 | 16 | 11 | 95 |
