= FC Rottach-Egern =

German amateur football team

- Full name: Fußball-Club Rottach-Egern e.V.
- Founded: 20 February 1947; 79 years ago
- Stadium: Stadion am Birkenmoos
- Capacity: 2500
- League: Kreisklasse Zugspitze
- 2025/26: 11th of 15
- Website: https://www.fcrottach.de/
Home colours

Fußball-Club Rottach - Egern e.V., known as FC Rottach-Egern, is a football club from the Upper Bavarian municipality of Rottach-Egern. The amateur club gained international recognition through its regular friendly matches against FC Bayern Munich. Additionally, European top clubs often used the sports facilities at Tegernsee for their summer preseason training. The club was founded in 1946 and currently plays in the Kreisklasse Zugspitze Group 2 (8th division).

== History ==
After World War II, some football enthusiasts, under the leadership of Albert "Didi" Distler, joined the TSV Rottach-Egern as a football department in June 1946 at Café Winkler. A few weeks later, the first match was played against TuS Marienstein. On August 1, 1946, the Rottachers registered for league play and on February 20, 1947, the FC Rottach-Egern was founded at the Gasthof zur Weißach.

In league play, the highest division the club has reached so far is the Bezirksliga. The promotion was achieved 4 times (1969, 1978–1981, 1995–2000, and most recently in 2002). Currently, the first team of FC Rottach-Egern is in the Kreisklasse Zugspitze and finished the 2022/23 season in 6th place (out of 8)

== Training camps ==
The first football field of FC Rottach-Egern was located on Aribostraße but had to be relocated in 1956 due to social housing construction. For this reason, the club initially played its home games at various locations, while in 1959, the construction of a new sports field began. This new field had a capacity of up to 2500 spectators and was inaugurated on September

The Tegernsee Training Camp is often used for summer preseason training. Major European top teams such as Blackburn Rovers, Arsenal FC, FC Bayern Munich, Liverpool FC, Manchester City, TSG 1899 Hoffenheim, Borussia Mönchengladbach, and FC Basel have spent their summers there. Due to high demand, in 2018, Liverpool FC under Jürgen Klopp was refused permission to visit the training camp again in the summer of 2019. Similarly, the Spanish top club Atlético Madrid also received a refusal in the same year.

In the 1970s, FC Bayern Munich was the first major club to set up camp in the Prealps town in southern Bavaria. The record champions are regulars in Rottach and, except for a break from 2006 to 2018, they came every summer for preseason training at the Tegernsee.

Traditionally, a friendly match between Bundesliga clubs and the Kreisliga team FC Rottach-Egern often follows. Although FC Rottach-Egern has never won, the games are highly popular, attracting millions of viewers on platforms like YouTube.

== Friendly matches against FC Bayern ==
Encounters with FC Bayern Munich
| Date | Result | Scorers |
|---|---|---|
| 30.07.2026 | 15:0 (6:0) | For Bayern: Pavlović (2), Ibrahimović (2), Chávez (2), Cardozo (2), Seib (2), Assomo (2), Palhinha, Kimmich |
| 24.07.2024 | 14:1 (7:1) | For Bayern: Tel (3), Ličina (2), Irankunda (2), Mazraoui, Guerreiro, Ibrahimović, Boey, Sadat, Asp, Aséko Nkili For Rottach: Schlichtner |
| 18.07.2023 | 27:0 (18:0) | For Bayern: Musiala (5), Tel (5), Sabitzer (5), Gnabry (3), Davies, Laimer, Mazraoui, Upamecano, Sané, Guerreiro, Gravenberch, Coman, Mané |
| 08.08.2019 | 23:0 (11:0) | For Bayern: Tolisso (4), Lewandowski (3), Goretzka (3), Wriedt (3), Thomas Müller (3), Renato Sanches (2), Dajaku, Gnabry, Singh, Nollenberger, Dietrich (OG) |
| 08.08.2018 | 20:2 (7:2) | For Bayern: Coman (3), Lewandowski (3), Wagner (3), Franzke (3), Thomas Müller (2), James (2), Thiago, Rudy, Ribéry, Kimmich For Rottach: Schmidt, Pfluger |
| 26.07.2006 | 14:1 (7:1) | For Bayern: Makaay (4), Santa Cruz (3), Maierhofer (3), Saba (2), dos Santos, Scholl, Salihamidzic For Rottach: Hofbauer |
