= Anthony Pavlešić =

Croatian footballer (born 2006)

Personal information
- Full name: Anthony Jacob Pavlešić
- Date of birth: 31 January 2006 (age 20)
- Place of birth: Fairfield, Australia
- Height: 1.90 m (6 ft 3 in)
- Position: Goalkeeper

Team information
- Current team: Sigma Olomouc
- Number: 31

Youth career
- –2017: Sydney United
- 2017–2022: Western Sydney Wanderers
- 2022–2023: Central Coast Mariners
- 2023–2025: Bayern Munich

Senior career*
Years	Team	Apps	(Gls)
2022–2023	CCM Academy	3	(0)
2023	Central Coast Mariners	0	(0)
2023–2025	Bayern Munich II	10	(0)
2024–2025	Bayern Munich	0	(0)
2025–2026	NK Rudeš	19	(0)
2026–	Sigma Olomouc	0	(0)

International career^{‡}
2022–2023	Australia U17	10	(0)
2023–2025	Australia U20	5	(0)
2025	Australia U23	1	(0)
2025–	Croatia U21	3	(0)
- * Club domestic league appearances and goals as of 16 June 2026 ‡ National team caps and goals as of 9 September 2025

Anthony Jacob Pavlešić (born 31 January 2006) is a professional footballer who plays as a goalkeeper for Czech First League club Sigma Olomouc. Born in Australia, and a former Australian youth international, he represents Croatia internationally.

== Club career ==
=== Central Coast Mariners ===
Pavlešić started his youth football at the NPL level, playing for Sydney United and Western Sydney Wanderers before moving to Gosford to join Central Coast Mariners.

In February 2023, Pavlešić was offered a two-week trial for Bayern Munich and Bayer Leverkusen in Germany. Additionally, he was offered a one-week trial by Dutch club Ajax. On 9 March, Pavlesic signed a scholarship deal with the Mariners. During his time with the club, he trained under goalkeeping coach Miguel Miranda who had developed players with the likes of Ederson and Jan Oblak. Pavlešić would make 3 appearances on the bench for the A-League Men squad, however, he was praised and recognised for his professionalism and composure as a goalkeeper by academy coach Abbas Saad.

=== Bayern Munich ===
After impressing in trials over in Germany, on 19 June 2023, Pavlešić signed a three-year contract with Bayern Munich for an undisclosed fee.

In his first months with the club, Pavlešić was unable to be named on the match squad due to paperwork issues with FIFA. He made his debut for Bayern Munich II in a 4–2 home victory Regionalliga Bayern match against SpVgg Ansbach on 3 October 2023.

Pavlešić was called up with the Bayern Munich senior team for most of their friendly matches on their 2024–25 pre-season, however he only featured on the first friendly match against German club FC Rottach-Egern on 24 July 2024, coming off the bench at the 46th minute replacing Sven Ulreich.

He received his first call-up with the Bayern Munich senior team for a 2–1 away loss Bundesliga match against Mainz 05, on 14 December 2024.

=== NK Rudeš ===
On 14 August 2025, Pavlešić moved to Croatia and joined Prva NL club NK Rudeš permanently.

=== Sigma Olomouc ===
On 10 July 2026, Pavlešić signed a contract with Czech First League club Sigma Olomouc.

== International career ==
Pavlešić received his first call-up to the Australia U17 squad to initially play in the AFF U-16 Youth Championship in Indonesia. In October 2022, he was named captain for the squad prior to the 2023 AFC U-17 Asian Cup qualification after impressing the coaching staff with his leadership qualities.

On 8 May 2025, Pavlešić's request to switch international allegiance to Croatia was approved by FIFA.

== Career statistics ==
=== Club ===
As of match played 14 February 2026

Appearances and goals by club, season and competition
Club	Season	League			National cup		Other		Total	
Club	Season	Division	Apps	Goals	Apps	Goals	Apps	Goals	Apps	Goals
CCM Academy	2023	National Premier Leagues NSW	3	0	—		—		3	0
CCM Academy	Total		3	0	—		—		3	0
Bayern Munich II	2023–24	Regionalliga Bayern	1	0	—		—		1	0
Bayern Munich II	2024–25	Regionalliga Bayern	9	0	—		—		9	0
Bayern Munich II	Total		10	0	—		—		10	0
Bayern Munich	2024–25	Bundesliga	0	0	0	0	0	0	0	0
Bayern Munich	Total		0	0	0	0	0	0	0	0
NK Rudeš	2025–26	Prva NL	7	0	—		0	0	7	0
NK Rudeš	Total		7	0	0	0	0	0	7	0
Career total			20	0	0	0	0	0	20	0

== Personal life ==
Anthony was born in Fairfield, New South Wales, a suburb of Western Sydney, the third child of four to Linda and Steve Pavlešić. His brother, Adam, currently plays for NPL side Sydney United 58 FC, and both are of Croatian descent. He also has a brother, Matthew.

== Honours ==
Bayern Munich

- Bundesliga: 2024–25
