= Arijon Ibrahimović =

German footballer (born 2005)

Personal information
- Full name: Arijon Ibrahimović
- Date of birth: 11 December 2005 (age 20)
- Place of birth: Nuremberg, Germany
- Height: 1.76 m (5 ft 9 in)
- Positions: Midfielder; winger

Team information
- Current team: FC Augsburg (on loan from Bayern Munich)
- Number: 21

Youth career
- Tuspo Nürnberg
- 2013–2014: Greuther Fürth
- 2014–2018: 1. FC Nürnberg
- 2018–2023: Bayern Munich

Senior career*
Years	Team	Apps	(Gls)
2022–2025	Bayern Munich II	15	(6)
2023–	Bayern Munich	2	(0)
2023–2024	→ Frosinone (loan)	16	(1)
2025	→ Lazio (loan)	1	(0)
2025–2026	→ 1. FC Heidenheim (loan)	32	(2)
2026–	→ FC Augsburg (loan)	6	(1)

International career^{‡}
2020	Germany U16	2	(0)
2021–2022	Germany U17	13	(9)
2022–2023	Germany U18	8	(2)
2023	Germany U19	1	(0)
2024–	Germany U20	4	(1)
2025–	Germany U21	5	(1)
- * Club domestic league appearances and goals as of 17:30, 31 October 2026 (UTC) ‡ National team caps and goals as of 18:41, 6 October 2026 (UTC)

Arijon Ibrahimović (Albanian: Arion Ibrahimi; born 11 December 2005) is a German professional footballer who plays as a midfielder and winger for Bundesliga club FC Augsburg, on loan from Bayern Munich. He is a German youth international.

== Club career ==
=== Youth career ===
Ibrahimović is a youth product of Greuther Fürth and 1. FC Nürnberg, he moved to the youth academy of Bayern Munich in 2018. Impressing with his talent and skills he played for their U17 side at the age of 14, and U19 at the age of 16. He started training with the senior team in the preseason for the 2021–22 season. In September 2022, he was named by English newspaper The Guardian as one of the best players born in 2005 worldwide.

=== Bayern Munich ===
On 13 January 2023, Ibrahimović along with fellow Bayern Munich academy players Johannes Schenk, Tarek Buchmann, Yusuf Kabadayı and Lovro Zvonarek, made his debut with the senior team of Bayern Munich on a friendly match against Austrian club Red Bull Salzburg, coming as a substitute off the bench at the second half replacing Jamal Musiala, he scored the second goal for the team while being down 3–1, ultimately the match ended 4–4 in a draw. Days later on 17 January 2023, he signed a contract extension until 2025 with Bayern Munich, being fully promoted to the senior team.

On 11 February 2023, Ibrahimović made his Bundesliga debut in a 3–0 win over VfL Bochum, coming on as substitute for Leroy Sané in the 77th minute, in which he became the second youngest debutant for the club, only behind Paul Wanner.

==== 2023–2024: Loan to Frosinone ====
On 1 September 2023, he was sent on loan to newly promoted Serie A club Frosinone, with an option to make the move permanent at the end of the season. Later that year, on 6 November, he recorded a goal and an assist during a 2–1 victory over Empoli.

==== Return to Bayern Munich ====
On 2 July 2024, Bayern Munich announced they had extended Ibrahimović's contract until 2027.

Ibrahimović made his UEFA Champions League debut with Bayern Munich during their sixth league phase game on 10 December 2024, at a 5–1 away win against Shakhtar Donetsk, substituting Thomas Müller.

==== 2025–2026: Loan to Lazio and 1. FC Heidenheim ====
On 13 January 2025, Ibrahimović moved back to Serie A, on a six-month loan with Lazio until the end of the 2024–25 season, having an option to make the move permanent.

On 25 June 2025, fellow Bundesliga club 1. FC Heidenheim announced his signing, with Ibrahimović returning to his native Germany and joining the club on loan for the 2025–26 season. He scored his first Bundesliga goal from a penalty in a 3–3 draw against VfB Stuttgart on 22 February 2026.

==== Contract extension and loan to FC Augsburg ====
On 7 July 2026, Ibrahimović returned to his parent club, Bayern Munich, after his loan spell, and extended his contract with the club until 2028. On 1 September 2026, he joined fellow Bundesliga club FC Augsburg, on loan for the 2026–27 season, with the option to make the move permanent.

== International career ==
Ibrahimović played two matches for the Germany U16 in 2020. In August 2021, he made his debut for the Germany U17 in a friendly against Poland U17. During qualification for the 2022 European Under-17 Championship, he played in all six qualifying matches, scoring three goals. At the following finals, which took place in May–June 2022 in Israel, he scored one goal in three appearances, but his team was eliminated in the quarterfinals by the eventual European champions France U17 (4–5 on penalties). Overall, Ibrahimović scored nine goals in 13 matches for the U17 team.

On 25 October 2025, he, along with teammate Diant Ramaj, met with the president of the Football Federation of Kosovo, Agim Ademi, after their Bundesliga match with 1. FC Heidenheim against TSG Hoffenheim, which was seen as a possible indication of both Ibrahimović and Ramaj's interest in representing Kosovo at the senior international level.

== Style of play ==
Ibrahimović is a box to box midfielder who is adept at defending and attacking, a technical player, who is also a presser and has intelligent positioning. He has earned comparisons in playstyle to Leon Goretzka.

== Personal life ==
Ibrahimović's parents are ethnic Albanians from Prizren, Kosovo. His older brother Leunard is also a footballer and plays for Bayernliga Nord club ATSV Erlangen. Despite sharing the same surname, Ibrahimović is of no relation to retired Swedish striker Zlatan Ibrahimović.

== Career statistics ==
As of match played 31 October 2026

Appearances and goals by club, season and competition
Club	Season	League			National cup (Note: Includes DFB-Pokal, Coppa Italia)		Europe		Other		Total	
Club	Season	Division	Apps	Goals	Apps	Goals	Apps	Goals	Apps	Goals	Apps	Goals
Bayern Munich	2022–23	Bundesliga	1	0	0	0	0	0	0	0	1	0
Bayern Munich	2023–24	Bundesliga	0	0	0	0	0	0	0	0	0	0
Bayern Munich	2024–25	Bundesliga	1	0	1	0	1 (Note: Appearance in UEFA Champions League)	0	0	0	3	0
Bayern Munich	2026–27	Bundesliga	0	0	0	0	0	0	0	0	0	0
Bayern Munich	Total		2	0	1	0	1	0	0	0	4	0
Bayern Munich II	2022–23	Regionalliga Bayern	9	3	—		—		—		9	3
Bayern Munich II	2023–24	Regionalliga Bayern	2	1	—		—		—		2	1
Bayern Munich II	2024–25	Regionalliga Bayern	4	2	—		—		—		4	2
Bayern Munich II	Total		15	6	—		—		—		15	6
Frosinone (loan)	2023–24	Serie A	16	1	2	1	—		—		18	2
Lazio (loan)	2024–25	Serie A	1	0	1	0	0	0	—		2	0
1. FC Heidenheim (loan)	2025–26	Bundesliga	32	2	2	0	—		—		34	2
Augsburg	2026–27	Bundesliga	6	1	1	1	—		—		7	2
Career total			72	10	7	2	1	0	0	0	80	12

== Honours ==
Bayern Munich

- Bundesliga: 2022–23, 2024–25
- Franz Beckenbauer Supercup: 2026
