= Javi Fernández (footballer, born 2006) =

Spanish footballer

Personal information
- Full name: Javier Fernández González
- Date of birth: 28 November 2006 (age 19)
- Place of birth: Ourense, Spain
- Height: 1.86 m (6 ft 1 in)
- Position: Midfielder

Team information
- Current team: 1. FC Nürnberg; (on loan from Bayern Munich)
- Number: 8

Youth career
- 2013–2016: Pabellón
- 2016–2017: Celta Vigo
- 2017–2022: Atlético Madrid
- 2023–2025: Bayern Munich

Senior career*
Years	Team	Apps	(Gls)
2023–	Bayern Munich II	13	(2)
2025–	Bayern Munich	0	(0)
2026–	→ 1. FC Nürnberg (loan)	17	(0)

International career^{‡}
2021–2022	Spain U16	11	(2)
2023	Spain U17	6	(0)
2024	Spain U18	1	(0)
- * Club domestic league appearances and goals as of 24 October 2026 ‡ National team caps and goals as of 15:18, 21 January 2024 (UTC)

Javier Fernández González (born 28 November 2006) is a Spanish professional footballer who plays as a midfielder for 2. Bundesliga club 1. FC Nürnberg, on loan from Bayern Munich.

== Club career ==
=== Early career ===
Born in Ourense, Fernández joined the academy of local side Pabellón Ourense at the age of six. His performances at Pabellón eventually caught the attention of professional club Celta Vigo, and he spent one season with the club, playing with players older than him. At the age of nine, he was invited to join Atlético Madrid, and joined the following year, on 2017. However, he was unable to play for the first two months due to sanctions imposed on the club.

=== Bayern Munich ===
In August 2022, it was reported that he had left Atlético Madrid and was training with German side Bayern Munich. This deal was confirmed by Bayern Munich themselves on 28 November 2022, however, due to his age, Fernández could only join the club officially in January 2023.

On 31 October 2023, Fernández received his first call-up for Bayern Munich II as an unused substitute in the away 4–0 loss Regionalliga Bayern match against FC Augsburg II.

On 8 March 2024, he made his professional debut for Bayern Munich II on a 2–0 home win Regionalliga Bayern match against DJK Vilzing, he started the game but was sent off after receiving a second yellow card on the 61st minute.

Fernández was called up with the Bayern Munich senior team for their 2024–25 pre-season, featuring as a substitute and coming off the bench at the 66th minute replacing Eric Dier on the second friendly match for a 1–1 draw against German club 1. FC Düren on 28 July 2024. Later on 13 August, he started as a centre-back on the last friendly match on a 3–0 win against Austrian Bundesliga club WSG Tirol.

He received his first official call-up with the Bayern Munich senior team on 21 December 2025, during a 4–0 away win Bundesliga match against 1. FC Heidenheim, as an unused substitute however.

Fernández was called up for the 5–0 win friendly match against Austrian Bundesliga club Red Bull Salzburg on 6 January 2026, substituting Deniz Ofli at the 82nd minute.

==== Loan to 1. FC Nürnberg ====
On 31 January 2026, he extended his contract with Bayern Munich until 2028, and joined 2. Bundesliga club 1. FC Nürnberg on a six-month loan until the end of the 2025–26 season. Fernández made his debut with the club on 14 March 2026, substituting Tarek Buchmann at the 86th minute of a 3–2 away win 2. Bundesliga match against Holstein Kiel.

In June 2026, 1. FC Nürnberg reached an agreement for a one-year loan deal, bringing Fernández back ahead of the 2026–27 season.

== International career ==
Fernández has represented Spain at the under-16, under-17 and under-18 levels.

== Career statistics ==
=== Club ===
As of match played 10 October 2026

Appearances and goals by club, season and competition
Club	Season	League			Cup (Note: Includes DFB-Pokal)		Continental		Other		Total	
Club	Season	Division	Apps	Goals	Apps	Goals	Apps	Goals	Apps	Goals	Apps	Goals
Bayern Munich II	2023–24	Regionalliga Bayern	8	1	—		—		—		8	1
Bayern Munich II	2024–25	Regionalliga Bayern	3	1	—		—		—		3	1
Bayern Munich II	2025–26	Regionalliga Bayern	2	0	—		—		—		2	0
Bayern Munich II	Total		13	2	—		—		—		13	2
Bayern Munich	2025–26	Bundesliga	0	0	0	0	0	0	0	0	0	0
Bayern Munich	Total		0	0	0	0	0	0	0	0	0	0
1. FC Nürnberg (loan)	2025–26	2. Bundesliga	5	0	—		—		0	0	5	0
1. FC Nürnberg (loan)	2026–27	2. Bundesliga	7	0	1	0	—		0	0	8	0
1. FC Nürnberg (loan)	Total		28	0	1	0	—		0	0	29	0
Career total			28	2	1	0	0	0	0	0	19	2

== Style of play ==
Fernández describes himself as a box-to-box midfielder, while he lists his favourite position as attacking midfield. He models his style of play on Real Madrid player Federico Valverde.
