= Max Scholze =

German footballer (born 2005)

Personal information
- Date of birth: 30 April 2005 (age 21)
- Place of birth: Meissen, Germany
- Position: Right back

Team information
- Current team: Estrela da Amadora
- Number: 21

Youth career
- Dynamo Dresden
- 2019–2024: Bayern Munich

Senior career*
| Years | Team | Apps | (Gls) |
| 2022–2025 | Bayern Munich II | 40 | (0) |
| 2024 | → SC Verl (loan) | 6 | (0) |
| 2024 | → SC Verl II (loan) | 1 | (0) |
| 2025 | SSV Ulm | 15 | (2) |
| 2026– | Estrela da Amadora | 20 | (1) |

International career
| 2021 | Germany U17 | 2 | (0) |
| 2024 | Germany U19 | 1 | (0) |
- * Club domestic league appearances and goals as of 15:55, 26 October 2026 (UTC)

Max Scholze (born 30 April 2005) is a German professional footballer who plays as a right back for Primeira Liga club Estrela da Amadora.

== Club career ==
Born in Meissen in the state of Saxony, Scholze began playing as a youth for local Dynamo Dresden before joining Bayern Munich in 2019. He played for their reserves in the fourth-tier Regionalliga Bayern. For the 2024–25 season, he was loaned to SC Verl in the 3. Liga, but the deal was cancelled due to only making six appearances. In June 2025, he joined SSV Ulm in the same league, on a two-year deal. He scored twice in 16 games in his half-season at the club.

On 28 January 2026, Scholze transferred to Estrela da Amadora in Portugal's Primeira Liga, on a contract until June 2028. In an interview in April, he said the offer from Estrela came unexpectedly, and he had gone from Germany's third tier to playing in a local derby against Sporting CP. On 5 September, he scored his first goal for the club, in a 2–2 draw at home to Famalicão.

== International career ==
Scholze played two friendly matches for Germany under-17 against Turkey in November 2021, both 2–1 wins. On 22 May 2024, he played in a 5–1 friendly loss for the under-19 team away to Denmark.
