= Raphaël Guerreiro =

Footballer (born 1993)

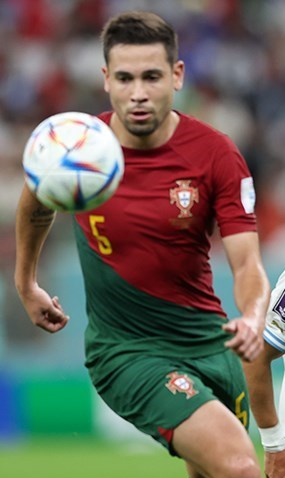
- Guerreiro with Portugal at the 2022 FIFA World Cup

Personal information
- Full name: Raphaël Adelino José Guerreiro
- Date of birth: 22 December 1993 (age 32)
- Place of birth: Le Blanc-Mesnil, France
- Height: 1.70 m (5 ft 7 in)
- Positions: Left-back; midfielder

Youth career
- 1999–2006: Blanc-Mesnil
- 2006–2009: Clairefontaine
- 2009–2012: Caen

Senior career*
| Years | Team | Apps | (Gls) |
| 2010–2012 | Caen B | 55 | (4) |
| 2012–2013 | Caen | 38 | (1) |
| 2013–2016 | Lorient | 102 | (10) |
| 2016–2023 | Borussia Dortmund | 162 | (30) |
| 2023–2026 | Bayern Munich | 61 | (12) |

International career
| 2013–2015 | Portugal U21 | 13 | (0) |
| 2014–2023 | Portugal | 65 | (4) |
Medal record
Men's football
Representing Portugal
UEFA European Championship
| Winner | 2016 France |
UEFA Nations League
| Winner | 2019 Portugal |
FIFA Confederations Cup
| Third place | 2017 Russia |
UEFA European Under-21 Championship
| Runner-up | 2015 Czech Republic |
- * Club domestic league appearances and goals as of 15:28, 16 May 2026 (UTC)

Raphaël Adelino José Guerreiro ComM (European Portuguese: [ʁɐfɐˈɛl ɡɨˈʁɐjɾu]; born 22 December 1993) is a professional footballer who plays as a left-back and midfielder.

He began his career at Caen, signing in 2013 with Lorient where he made his Ligue 1 debut. In June 2016, he joined Borussia Dortmund, going on to win two DFB-Pokal and the 2019 DFL-Supercup while totalling 224 games and 40 goals. He moved to Bayern Munich in 2023 on a free transfer, claiming four trophies during his spell including the 2024–25 and 2025–26 national championships.

Born in France, Guerreiro represented Portugal at under-21 and senior level, first appearing for the latter in 2014. He was part of their squad at two World Cups and two European Championships, winning Euro 2016.

== Club career ==
=== Caen ===
Born in Le Blanc-Mesnil, Seine-Saint-Denis to a Portuguese father and a French mother, Guerreiro played youth football for three clubs, finishing his development at Caen after signing in 2009 at the age of 15. After starting as a senior with the reserve team, he made his professional debut in the 2012–13 season, appearing in all the games and failing to start only once in an eventual fourth-place finish in Ligue 2; he was also elected to the Team of the Year.

=== Lorient ===
On 27 June 2013, Guerreiro moved to Ligue 1 after signing a four-year contract with Lorient. His maiden appearance in the competition took place on 10 August, as he featured the full 90 minutes in a 1–0 away loss against Lille.

On 1 November 2014, Guerreiro scored his first goal for Lorient, opening the scoring at title-holders Paris Saint-Germain in an eventual 2–1 defeat. He finished the campaign with seven goals to help his team stave off relegation, including the equaliser as they came from behind to defeat his former employers 2–1 at the Stade du Moustoir.

Guerreiro opened the scoring in a Derby Breton on 24 October 2015, assisted by Majeed Waris in a 1–1 home draw against Rennes.

=== Borussia Dortmund ===
On 16 June 2016, Borussia Dortmund signed Guerreiro on a four-year contract for a reported fee of €12 million (£9.5 million). Under coach Thomas Tuchel, he was primarily deployed as a midfielder.

Guerreiro scored his first goal in the UEFA Champions League on 14 September 2016, in a 6–0 away win against Legia Warsaw in the group phase. In the 2018–19 edition of the competition, and also at that stage, he added braces in victories over Atlético Madrid (4–0, home) and Monaco (2–0).

On 27 May 2023, in the last matchday, Guerreiro scored his fourth goal of the season – he also totalled 12 assists– to help the hosts to come back from a 2–0 deficit against Mainz 05 and draw 2–2, but Der Klassiker rivals Bayern Munich defeated 1. FC Köln 2–1 away and were crowned Bundesliga champions instead. The following day, Dortmund announced the departure of five players, including Guerreiro.

=== Bayern Munich ===
On 23 June 2023, Bayern Munich announced that they had secured Guerreiro as a free agent; he agreed to a three-year deal. He made his debut for the club on 26 September, coming off the bench in a 4–0 away win over Preußen Münster in the first round of the DFB-Pokal. He scored his first goal on 11 November, taking the field at the hour mark and netting the Bavarians' third in a 4–2 league home victory against 1. FC Heidenheim.

On 8 March 2025, Guerreiro scored twice in the first half of the home fixture against VfL Bochum, the second goal coming through a header, but his compatriot João Palhinha was sent off late into it as the opposition came from behind to take it 3–2 for their first ever win at Bayern's ground. He netted a further two times for the eventual champions, from 23 appearances.

Guerreiro and his team again won the league in the 2025–26 campaign. On 19 April 2026, he opened the 4–2 home win over VfB Stuttgart to secure the title. He left on 30 June, with this having been announced three months earlier.

== International career ==
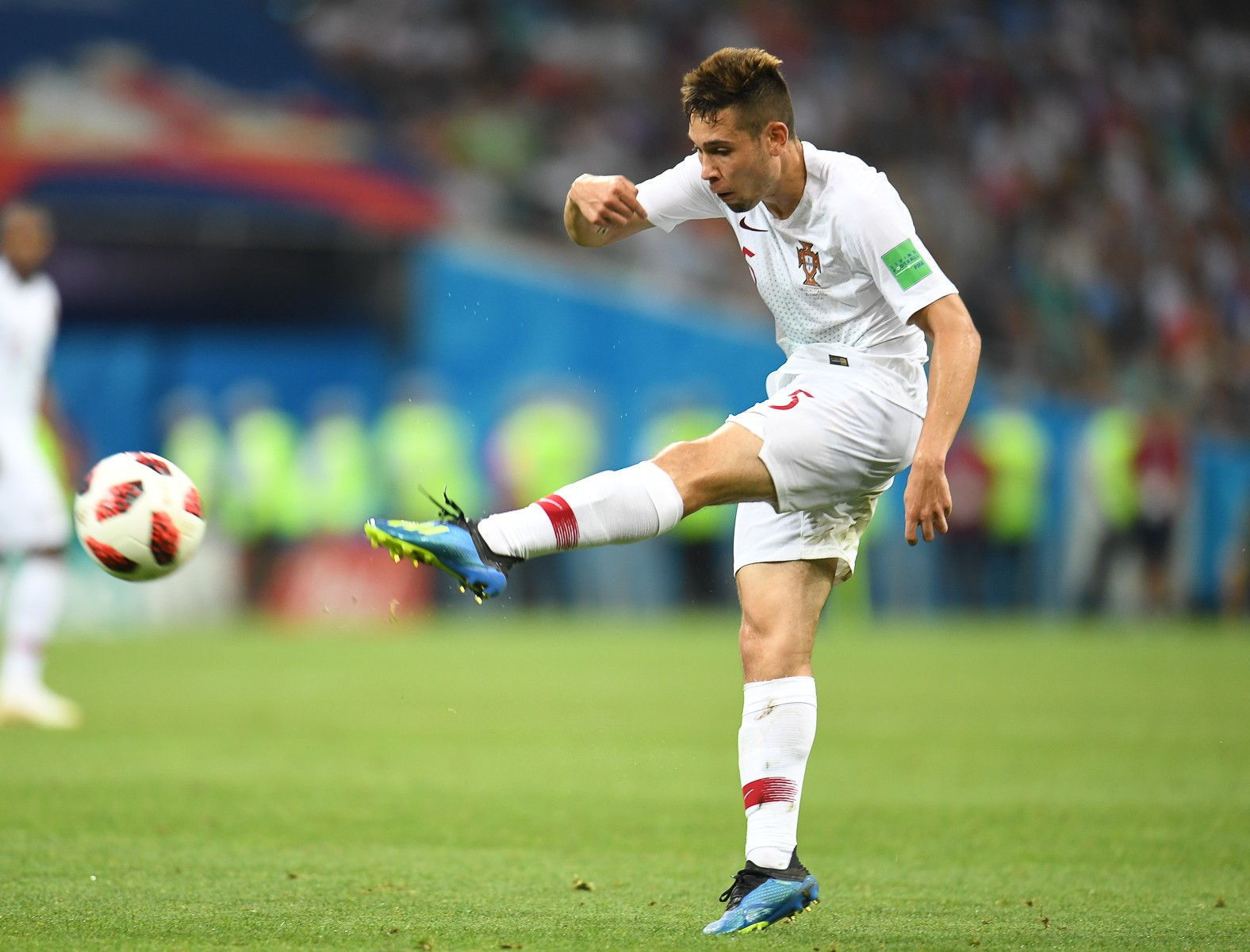
Guerreiro playing for Portugal at the 2018 FIFA World Cup

Guerreiro accepted the call to represent the Portugal under-21 team after being spotted by Rui Jorge's coaching staff, making his debut on 21 March 2013 in a 0–1 home defeat against Sweden. On 7 November 2014, even though he hardly spoke Portuguese, he was called up by Fernando Santos to the full side, for a UEFA Euro 2016 qualifier against Armenia and a friendly with Argentina. He made his debut on 14 November against the former opponent, playing the entire 1–0 win in Faro. Four days later, against Argentina, he scored in the last minute for the only goal at Old Trafford.

Guerreiro returned to the under-21s for the 2015 UEFA European Championship in the Czech Republic, helping them finish in second place. He was one of five Portuguese included in the Team of the Tournament.

Guerreiro was selected by the main squad for their UEFA Euro 2016 campaign, playing the full 90 minutes in the first game, a 1–1 draw with Iceland in Saint-Étienne. Portugal went on to win the competition, defeating hosts France 1–0 in the final in extra time; following his performances throughout the competition, he was nominated for the Young Player of the Tournament Award, which ultimately went to his teammate Renato Sanches.

In spite of an injury-riddled season, Guerreiro was picked for the 2018 FIFA World Cup. He started four matches in Russia, in a round-of-16 exit.

Guerreiro also made the squad for UEFA Euro 2020. He opened the 3–0 victory over Hungary in the first group fixture, but scored an own goal the following one in a 4–2 loss to Germany.

In November 2022, Guerreiro was named in the final squad for the 2022 FIFA World Cup. On 6 December, he scored his team's fourth in an eventual 6–1 rout of Switzerland in Lusail in the round of 16.

Guerreiro sustained an ankle injury in May 2024 which kept him out of Euro 2024.

== Personal life ==
In 2014, Guerreiro said that he supported Benfica, dreamed of playing for Real Madrid, and that his favourite player was Cristiano Ronaldo. His Portugal under-21 manager, Rui Jorge, remembered him as a very introverted character, in part due to his language difficulties.

Guerreiro and his family used to watch matches of the Portugal national team, of which Pauleta was a footballer he admired.

== Career statistics ==
=== Club ===
As of match played 23 May 2026

Appearances and goals by club, season and competition
| Club | Season | League | | | National cup (Note: Includes Coupe de France, DFB-Pokal) | | League cup (Note: Includes Coupe de la Ligue) | | Europe | | Other | | Total | |
| Club | Season | Division | Apps | Goals | Apps | Goals | Apps | Goals | Apps | Goals | Apps | Goals | Apps | Goals |
|---|---|---|---|---|---|---|---|---|---|---|---|---|---|---|
| Caen II | 2010–11 | CFA | 21 | 1 | — | | — | | — | | — | | 21 | 1 |
| Caen II | 2011–12 | CFA | 34 | 3 | — | | — | | — | | — | | 34 | 3 |
| Caen II | Total | | 55 | 4 | — | | — | | — | | — | | 55 | 4 |
| Caen | 2012–13 | Ligue 2 | 38 | 1 | 1 | 0 | 2 | 0 | — | | — | | 41 | 1 |
| Lorient | 2013–14 | Ligue 1 | 34 | 0 | 0 | 0 | 0 | 0 | — | | — | | 34 | 0 |
| Lorient | 2014–15 | Ligue 1 | 34 | 7 | 1 | 0 | 1 | 0 | — | | — | | 36 | 7 |
| Lorient | 2015–16 | Ligue 1 | 34 | 3 | 2 | 0 | 5 | 0 | — | | — | | 41 | 3 |
| Lorient | Total | | 102 | 10 | 3 | 0 | 6 | 0 | — | | — | | 111 | 10 |
| Borussia Dortmund | 2016–17 | Bundesliga | 24 | 6 | 5 | 0 | — | | 6 (Note: Appearances in UEFA Champions League) | 1 | — | | 35 | 7 |
| Borussia Dortmund | 2017–18 | Bundesliga | 9 | 1 | 2 | 0 | — | | 4 (Note: Three appearances and one goal in UEFA Champions League, one appearance in UEFA Europa League) | 1 | — | | 15 | 2 |
| Borussia Dortmund | 2018–19 | Bundesliga | 23 | 2 | 3 | 0 | — | | 6 | 4 | — | | 32 | 6 |
| Borussia Dortmund | 2019–20 | Bundesliga | 29 | 8 | 0 | 0 | — | | 8 | 0 | 1 (Note: Appearance in DFL/Franz Beckenbauer Supercup) | 0 | 38 | 8 |
| Borussia Dortmund | 2020–21 | Bundesliga | 27 | 5 | 5 | 0 | — | | 8 | 1 | 0 | 0 | 40 | 6 |
| Borussia Dortmund | 2021–22 | Bundesliga | 23 | 4 | 1 | 0 | — | | 4 (Note: Three appearances in UEFA Champions League, one appearance and one goal in UEFA Europa League) | 1 | 0 | 0 | 28 | 5 |
| Borussia Dortmund | 2022–23 | Bundesliga | 27 | 4 | 3 | 0 | — | | 6 | 2 | — | | 36 | 6 |
| Borussia Dortmund | Total | | 162 | 30 | 19 | 0 | — | | 42 | 10 | 1 | 0 | 224 | 40 |
| Bayern Munich | 2023–24 | Bundesliga | 20 | 3 | 1 | 0 | — | | 7 | 0 | 0 | 0 | 28 | 3 |
| Bayern Munich | 2024–25 | Bundesliga | 23 | 4 | 2 | 0 | — | | 9 | 1 | 4 (Note: Appearances in FIFA Club World Cup) | 0 | 38 | 5 |
| Bayern Munich | 2025–26 | Bundesliga | 18 | 5 | 3 | 0 | – | | 7 | 1 | 1 | 0 | 29 | 6 |
| Bayern Munich | Total | | 61 | 12 | 6 | 0 | — | | 23 | 2 | 5 | 0 | 95 | 14 |
| Career total | | | 418 | 57 | 29 | 0 | 8 | 0 | 65 | 12 | 6 | 0 | 526 | 69 |

=== International ===
Appearances and goals by national team and year
| National team | Year | Apps | Goals |
|---|---|---|---|
| Portugal | 2014 | 2 | 1 |
| Portugal | 2015 | 1 | 0 |
| Portugal | 2016 | 13 | 1 |
| Portugal | 2017 | 4 | 0 |
| Portugal | 2018 | 10 | 0 |
| Portugal | 2019 | 9 | 0 |
| Portugal | 2020 | 6 | 0 |
| Portugal | 2021 | 8 | 1 |
| Portugal | 2022 | 8 | 1 |
| Portugal | 2023 | 4 | 0 |
| Total | | 65 | 4 |

Portugal score listed first, score column indicates score after each Guerreiro goal.

List of international goals scored by Raphaël Guerreiro
| No. | Date | Venue | Cap | Opponent | Score | Result | Competition |
|---|---|---|---|---|---|---|---|
| 1 | 18 November 2014 | Old Trafford, Manchester, England | 2 | Argentina | 1–0 | 1–0 | Friendly |
| 2 | 29 May 2016 | Estádio do Dragão, Porto, Portugal | 6 | Norway | 2–0 | 3–0 | Friendly |
| 3 | 15 June 2021 | Puskás Aréna, Budapest, Hungary | 47 | Hungary | 1–0 | 3–0 | UEFA Euro 2020 |
| 4 | 6 December 2022 | Lusail Iconic Stadium, Lusail, Qatar | 60 | Switzerland | 4–0 | 6–1 | 2022 FIFA World Cup |

== Honours ==
Borussia Dortmund

- DFB-Pokal: 2016–17, 2020–21
- DFL-Supercup: 2019

Bayern Munich

- Bundesliga: 2024–25, 2025–26
- DFB-Pokal: 2025–26
- Franz Beckenbauer Supercup: 2025

Portugal

- UEFA European Championship: 2016
- UEFA Nations League: 2018–19
- FIFA Confederations Cup third place: 2017

Individual

- UEFA European Under-21 Championship Team of the Tournament: 2015
- UEFA European Championship Team of the Tournament: 2016
- UEFA Champions League Breakthrough XI: 2016
- Bundesliga Player of the Month: March 2023
- Bundesliga Goal of the Month: March 2025
- Bundesliga top assist provider: 2022–23

Orders

- Commander of the Order of Merit
