= Hannes Heilmair =

German footballer (born 2004)

Personal information
- Date of birth: 17 January 2004 (age 22)
- Height: 1.88 m (6 ft 2 in)
- Position: Goalkeeper

Youth career
- –2017: Bayern Munich
- 2017–2023: SpVgg Unterhaching

Senior career*
Years	Team	Apps	(Gls)
2021–2024	SpVgg Unterhaching	8	(0)
2023–2024	SpVgg Unterhaching II	12	(0)
2024–2026	Bayern Munich II	1	(0)
- * Club domestic league appearances and goals as of 26 April 2025

Hannes Heilmair (born 17 January 2004) is a German professional footballer who plays as an goalkeeper.

== Club career ==
Heilmair is a youth product of Bayern Munich, having progressed through the youth academy, later leaving for SpVgg Unterhaching in 2017.

He made his professional debut with SpVgg Unterhaching during the 2021–22 season, on 24 August 2021, playing full-time in a 4–1 home loss second round Bavarian Cup match against TSV Buchbach. Some days later he made his league debut with the club, starting during a 2–0 home loss Regionalliga Bayern match against FV Illertissen, on 3 September.

On 1 July 2024, Heilmair returned to Bayern Munich after 7 years, joining the reserve team ahead of the 2024–25 season. On 31 August 2026, he left the club as his contract was mutually terminated, becoming a free agent ahead of the 2026–27 season.

== Career statistics ==
=== Club ===
As of 26 April 2025

Appearances and goals by club, season and competition
Club	Season	League			DFB-Pokal		Other (Note: Includes Badenpokal)		Total	
Club	Season	Division	Apps	Goals	Apps	Goals	Apps	Goals	Apps	Goals
SpVgg Unterhaching	2021–22	Regionalliga Bayern	7	0	—		1 (Note: Appearance in Bavarian Cup)	0	8	0
SpVgg Unterhaching	2022–23	Regionalliga Bayern	1	0	—		0	0	1	4
SpVgg Unterhaching	2023–24	3. Liga	0	0	0	0	—		0	0
SpVgg Unterhaching	Total		8	0	0	0	1	0	9	0
SpVgg Unterhaching II	2023–24	Landesliga Bayern-Südwest	12	0	—		—		12	0
SpVgg Unterhaching II	Total		12	0	—		—		12	0
Bayern Munich II	2024–25	Regionalliga Bayern	1	0	—		—		1	0
Bayern Munich II	2025–26	Regionalliga Bayern	0	0	—		0	0	0	0
Bayern Munich II	Total		1	0	—		0	0	1	0
Career total			21	0	0	0	1	0	22	0
