= Mudaser Sadat =

German footballer (born 2007)

Personal information
- Date of birth: 17 February 2007 (age 19)
- Height: 1.78 m (5 ft 10 in)
- Positions: Midfielder; winger

Team information
- Current team: Bayern Munich II

Youth career
- –2018: TSV Herrsching
- 2018–2025: Bayern Munich

Senior career*
Years	Team	Apps	(Gls)
2024–	Bayern Munich II	20	(1)
2025	→ SKU Amstetten (loan)	3	(0)

International career^{‡}
2024	Germany U17	1	(0)
- * Club domestic league appearances and goals as of 27 October 2026 ‡ National team caps and goals as of 14 May 2024

Mudaser Sadat (born 17 February 2007) is a German professional footballer who plays as a midfielder and winger for Regionalliga Bayern club Bayern Munich II. He is a former German youth international.

== Club career ==
=== Bayern Munich ===
Sadat started his career with TSV Herrsching, in 2018 he joined the youth academy of Bundesliga side Bayern Munich, debuting professionally with Bayern Munich's reserve team during the 2023–24 season.

On August 13, 2024, he was called-up with the Bayern Munich senior team as an unused substitute for their last friendly match of the 2024–25 pre-season, a 3–0 win against Austrian Bundesliga club WSG Tirol.

Sadat scored his first professional goal on 10 April 2026, during the 2025–26 season in a 2–1 away loss Regionalliga Bayern match against Würzburger Kickers.

==== Loan to SKU Amstetten ====
In 2025, he moved to Austria and joined 2. Liga club SKU Amstetten on a one-year loan for the 2025–26 season. On 30 January 2026, his loan-spell was cut short and he returned to Bayern Munich II, after six-months in Austria.

== International career ==
Sadat holds dual German and Afghan citizenship, being eligible to represent either nation, he has represented Germany at the under-17 level.

== Career statistics ==
As of match played 27 October 2026

Appearances and goals by club, season and competition
Club	Season	League			Cup		Continental		Total	
Club	Season	Division	Apps	Goals	Apps	Goals	Apps	Goals	Apps	Goals
Bayern Munich II	2023–24	Regionalliga Bayern	1	0	—		—		1	0
Bayern Munich II	2024–25	Regionalliga Bayern	1	0	—		—		1	0
Bayern Munich II	2025–26	Regionalliga Bayern	13	1	—		—		13	1
Bayern Munich II	2026–27	Regionalliga Bayern	5	0	—		—		5	0
Bayern Munich II	Total		20	1	—		—		20	1
SKU Amstetten (loan)	2025–26	2. Liga	3	0	1 (Note: Appearance in Austrian Cup)	0	—		4	0
SKU Amstetten (loan)	Total		3	0	1	0	—		4	0
Career Total			23	1	1	0	0	0	24	1
