= Rareș Canea =

German footballer (born 2004)

Personal information
- Full name: Rareș Dumitru Canea
- Date of birth: 12 March 2004 (age 22)
- Place of birth: Constanța, Romania
- Height: 1.97 m (6 ft 6 in)
- Position: Defender

Youth career
- –2014: 1860 Munich
- 2014–2023: Bayern Munich

Senior career*
Years	Team	Apps	(Gls)
2023–2024	Bayern Munich II	0	(0)

International career
2019	Germany U16	2	(0)
- * Club domestic league appearances and goals

Rareș Dumitru Canea (born 12 March 2004) is a former footballer who played as a defender. Born in Romania, he was a Germany youth international.

== Early life ==
Canea moved with his family from Romania to Germany on 2011.

== Club career ==
As a youth player, Canea joined the youth academy of German side 1860 Munich. On 2014, he joined the youth academy of German Bundesliga side Bayern Munich. He captained the club's under-16 team.

After the 2023–24 season concluded, for which he did not see any action on the field, due to recurring injuries, on 1 July 2024, he retired from professional football.

== International career ==
He represented the Germany national under-16 football team, however he was eligible for both his native Romania and Germany.

== Style of play ==
Canea mainly operated as a centre-back.

== Personal life ==
Canea is the son of Dumitru Canea. He is a native of Constanța, Romania.
