= Adin Ličina =

German footballer (born 2007)

Personal information
- Date of birth: 6 January 2007 (age 19)
- Place of birth: Landshut, Germany
- Height: 1.80 m (5 ft 11 in)
- Positions: Attacking midfielder; winger; wide midfielder

Team information
- Current team: Cremonese (on loan from Juventus)
- Number: 10

Youth career
- 2015–2025: Bayern Munich
- 2026–: Juventus

Senior career*
Years	Team	Apps	(Gls)
2024–2026	Bayern Munich II	33	(3)
2026–	Juventus Next Gen	9	(1)
2026–	Juventus	0	(0)
2026–	→ Cremonese (loan)	8	(1)

International career^{‡}
2022	Germany U15	2	(0)
2022–2023	Germany U16	9	(2)
2023–2024	Germany U17	9	(1)
2025–	Germany U19	11	(1)
Medal record
Men's football
Representing Germany
UEFA European Under-19 Championship
Runner-up	2026 Wales
- * Club domestic league appearances and goals as of 8 November 2026 ‡ National team caps and goals as of 4 July 2026

Adin Ličina (born 6 January 2007) is a German professional footballer who plays as an attacking midfielder, winger and wide midfielder for Serie B club Cremonese, on loan from Juventus. He is a German youth international.

== Early life ==
Ličina was born on 6 January 2007 in Landshut, Germany, and is of Bosniak descent. His family originate from Bijelo Polje, Montenegro.

== Club career ==
=== Bayern Munich ===
As a youth player, Ličina joined the youth academy of Bundesliga side Bayern Munich. In 2024, he was promoted to club's reserve team. On 18 May 2024, he made his professional debut during a 2–1 away loss Regionalliga Bayern match against FC Eintracht Bamberg. Spanish news website Vavel wrote in 2025 that he "is considered to be one of the most exciting youth prospects in Germany, with the potential to be a key player for a top European club".

In October 2025, top-flight teams such as Serie A club Juventus and fellow Bundesliga clubs Borussia Dortmund and FC Augsburg showed an interest in recruiting him. Serie A giants AC Milan were the next club who showed strong interest in recruiting Ličina, just a couple of months later in December of the same year. Eredivisie club Ajax and Primeira Liga club Benfica were the latest sides to show interest in recruiting him, during the same month.

=== Juventus ===
On 2 February 2026, he moved to Italy and joined Juventus, signing a contract until 2029, and was initially assigned to their reserve team, Serie C club Juventus Next Gen.

Ličina scored his first league goal for Juve Next Gen in a 1–0 home win against Guidonia Montecelio, on 12 April 2026.

==== Loan to Cremonese ====
On 30 August 2026, he joined newly Serie B relegated club Cremonese, on loan for the 2026–27 season. Two days later, during his debut with the club, he scored the second goal of the 2–0 win with a chip shot in a Coppa Italia match against Parma, on 1 September.

== International career ==
Ličina is a Germany youth international. During March 2024, he played for the Germany national under-17 team for the 2024 UEFA European Under-17 Championship qualification.

He was one of the players who were called up with the Germany U20 national team by head coach Hannes Wolf for the Under 20 Elite League matches against Poland and Czech Republic, 13 and 16 November 2026 respectively.

== Career statistics ==
As of match played 18 April 2026

Appearances and goals by club, season and competition
Club	Season	League			National cup		Other		Total	
Club	Season	Division	Apps	Goals	Apps	Goals	Apps	Goals	Apps	Goals
Bayern Munich II	2023–24	Regionalliga Bayern	1	1	—		—		1	1
Bayern Munich II	2024–25	Regionalliga Bayern	16	1	—		—		16	1
Bayern Munich II	2025–26	Regionalliga Bayern	16	1	—		—		16	1
Bayern Munich II	Total		33	3	—		—		33	3
Juventus Next Gen	2025–26	Serie C	8	1	—		—		8	1
Cremonese	2026 - 27	Serie B	2	1					2	1
Career total			43	5	0	0	0	0	43	5

== Style of play ==
Ličina plays mainly as an attacking midfielder and he can be deployed as a winger and wide midfielder. Left-footed, he is known for his vision and dribbling ability.

== Honours ==
Germany U19

- UEFA European Under-19 Championship runner-up: 2026
