= Jamal Musiala =

German footballer (born 2003)

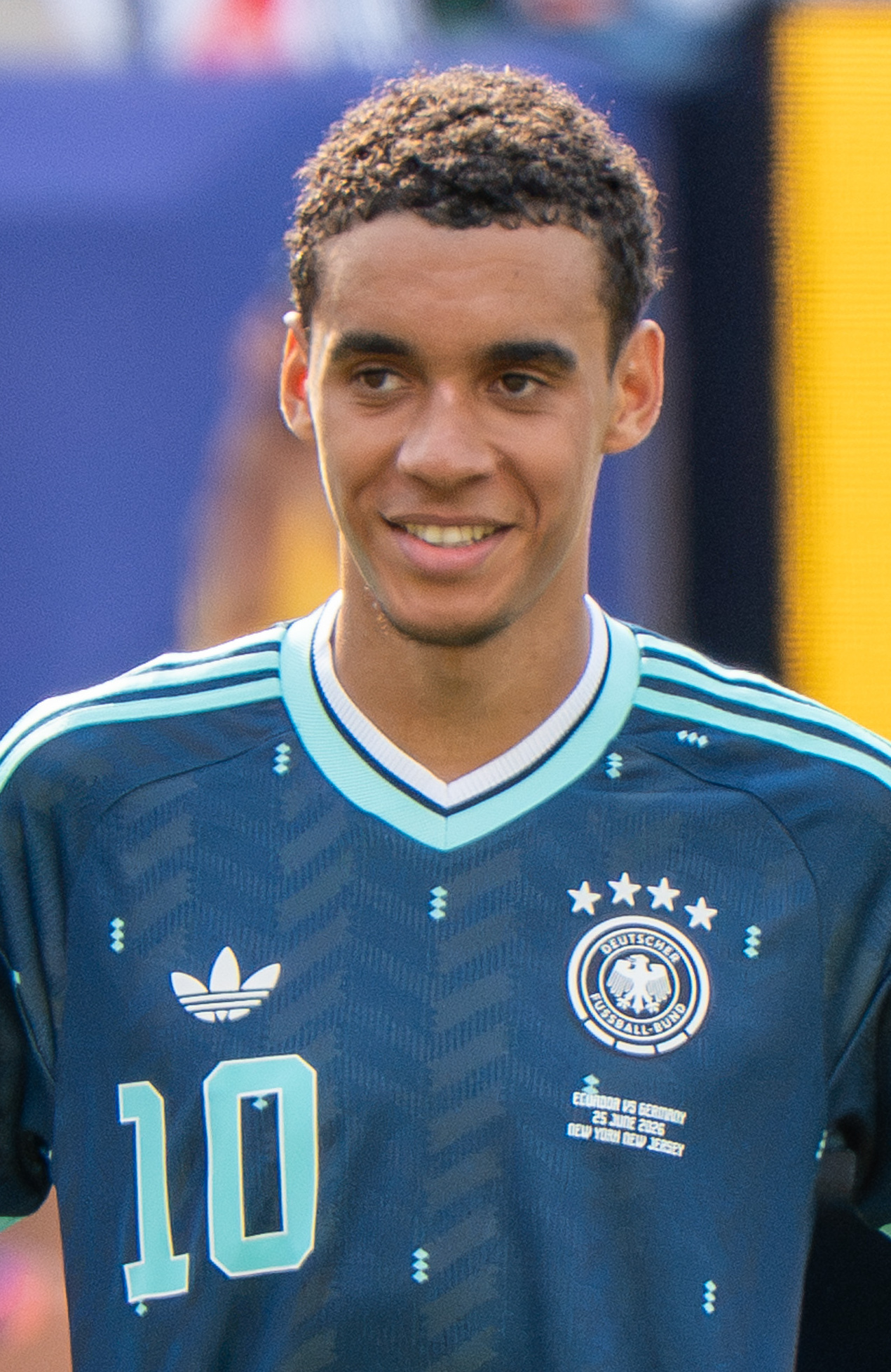
- Musiala with Germany in 2026

Personal information
- Full name: Jamal Musiala
- Date of birth: 26 February 2003 (age 23)
- Place of birth: Stuttgart, Germany
- Height: 1.86 m (6 ft 1 in)
- Position: Attacking midfielder

Team information
- Current team: Bayern Munich
- Number: 10

Youth career
- 2008–2010: TSV Lehnerz
- 2010–2011: Southampton
- 2011–2019: Chelsea
- 2019–2020: Bayern Munich

Senior career*
Years	Team	Apps	(Gls)
2020–2021	Bayern Munich II	10	(2)
2020–	Bayern Munich	158	(49)

International career^{‡}
2016–2017	England U15	3	(4)
2018	Germany U16	2	(0)
2018–2019	England U16	5	(2)
2019–2020	England U17	9	(2)
2020	England U21	2	(1)
2021–	Germany	46	(10)
- * Club domestic league appearances and goals as of 21:24, 20 November 2026 (UTC) ‡ National team caps and goals as of 15:51, 30 June 2026 (UTC)

Jamal Musiala (German pronunciation: [ˈdʒaːmal muˈzi̯aːla]; born 26 February 2003) is a German professional footballer who plays as an attacking midfielder for Bundesliga club Bayern Munich and the Germany national team. Known for his on-the-ball skills, dribbling, and acceleration, he is regarded as one of the best attacking midfielders in the world.

A former youth product for various clubs (including Chelsea), Musiala moved to Bayern Munich in 2019. In June 2020, at the age of 17, he made his senior debut for the club. Later that year, he was a part of the side that won the UEFA Champions League, UEFA Super Cup, and the FIFA Club World Cup. Since his debut for Bayern, he has won six Bundesliga titles with the club, making over 230 appearances.

A senior international since 2021, Musiala has represented Germany at two UEFA European Championships (2020 and 2024) and two FIFA World Cups (2022 and 2026). He was the joint winner of Euro 2024's Golden Boot, with three goals in the tournament.

== Early life ==
Musiala was born in Stuttgart, Germany, to his Nigerian-British father Daniel Richard and German mother with Polish roots, Carolin Musiala. He lived in Fulda until age seven, before moving to England with his family, where he remained for the rest of his childhood. He went to primary school at the Corpus Christi School in New Malden, and represented the school on behalf of a succession of local football clubs, including Fulham, Brentford, and Wimbledon in the EFL Utilita Kids Cup, winning the competition twice. For secondary school, he went to the Whitgift School in Croydon. Musiala spent the last years of his childhood at Chelsea Academy where he met Michael Olise.

Musiala has played for both Germany and England national teams at youth level, and eventually pledged his allegiance to the German Football Association in February 2021. At age 16, Musiala and his mother returned to Germany for personal reasons and the impending Brexit.

== Club career ==
=== Bayern Munich ===
==== 2019–20: Debut season ====
In July 2019, aged 16, Musiala left Chelsea to join Bundesliga club Bayern Munich. On 3 June 2020, Musiala made his professional debut, coming on as a substitute for Bayern Munich II in their 3–2 win over Preußen Münster in the 3. Liga. On 20 June 2020, he made his Bundesliga debut against SC Freiburg, and he became the youngest player to play a match for Bayern in the Bundesliga, aged 17 years and 115 days. Musiala was a part of the squad that won the 2019–20 UEFA Champions League, although he did not make any appearances in the tournament.

==== 2020–21: First-team breakthrough ====
On 18 September 2020, Musiala scored his first Bundesliga goal in an 8–0 win over Schalke, to become Bayern's youngest goalscorer, aged 17 years and 205 days, breaking the previous record of Roque Santa Cruz, aged 18 years and 12 days. On 3 November, Musiala made his Champions League debut as a substitute to Thomas Müller in a 6–2 away win over Red Bull Salzburg. On 1 December, he started in his first Champions League match in a 1–1 away draw against Atlético Madrid. On 23 February 2021, Musiala scored his first Champions League goal in a 4–1 away win over Lazio in the first leg of the round of 16 tie of the knockout phase, becoming the competition's youngest goalscorer of both English and German nationalities. He also became Bayern's youngest goalscorer in the European competition, aged 17 years and 363 days, breaking previous record by Samuel Kuffour. On 5 March, he signed his first professional contract with Bayern Munich until 2026.

==== 2021–2023: Continuous development and Bundesliga title decider ====
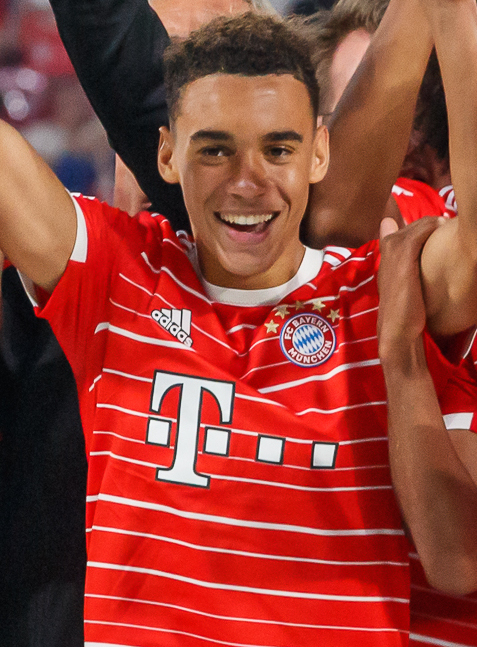
Musiala celebrating the win of the 2022 DFL-Supercup

On 25 August 2021, Musiala scored his first two goals of the season in a 12–0 DFB-Pokal away win over Bremer SV. Three days later, he then scored his first Bundesliga goal of the season in a 5–0 home win over Hertha BSC. On 8 December 2021, Musiala scored his first Champions League goal of the season in a 3–0 win over Barcelona. On 23 April 2022, Musiala's strike sealed the Bundesliga title in a 3–1 victory over Borussia Dortmund in Der Klassiker, giving Bayern their tenth straight Bundesliga title.

On 27 May 2023, Musiala scored the winning goal in the 89th minute in a 2–1 away victory over FC Köln. This goal clinched the 11th consecutive league title for his club again ahead of rivals Dortmund on goal difference. Moreover, he finished the season as Bayern's second top scorer in the league with 12 goals, behind Serge Gnabry.

==== 2023–2024: First career hat-trick ====
In the 2023–24 season, Musiala scored 13 goals in all competitions, including 10 goals in Bundesliga, concluding the campaign as the second top scorer for his club behind Harry Kane. On 30 October 2024, he scored his first career hat-trick in a 4–0 away victory over Mainz in the DFB-Pokal.

==== 2024–2025: Fibula fracture and comeback ====
On 14 February 2025, he extended his contract with Bayern until 2030. Later that year, on 15 June, he scored another hat-trick including a first career penalty in a 10–0 win against Auckland City during the 2025 FIFA Club World Cup, becoming the first ever player in the new CWC format to score a hattrick and reaching his personal best by netting his 20th goal of the season. He later acquired the number 10 shirt, succeeding Leroy Sané, ahead of the 2025–26 season. On 5 July 2025, he suffered a fractured fibula along with a dislocated and broken ankle after colliding with Paris Saint-Germain goalkeeper Gianluigi Donnarumma during the quarter-finals of the 2025 FIFA Club World Cup.

==== 2025–2026: Injury setback and Champions League appearance record ====
After 196 days, Musiala returned to the pitch on 17 January 2026, getting subbed on for Serge Gnabry in the 88th minute, and immediately assisting to Michael Olise after 76 seconds to help his team win 5–1 over RB Leipzig. He celebrated his return to the starting line-up twelve days later on 29 January in the Champions League, scoring a goal after a combination play with Lennart Karl in a 2–1 away victory over Eindhoven. On 6 March, he scored his first goal of the Bundesliga season from a penalty kick in a 4–1 home victory over Borussia Mönchengladbach. Four days later in the first leg of the Champions League round of 16, he scored his second goal of the competition's season in a 6–1 away victory over Atalanta, injuring his previously broken ankle again, forcing him to miss the international break. He returned to the pitch on 4 April in a 3–2 away win over Freiburg. Three days later, he featured in a 2–1 away win against Real Madrid in the Champions League quarter-final, getting subbed on in the 69th minute for Serge Gnabry. On 11 April, Musiala set Bayern's all-time record from 1971–72 for the most scored goals in a single season, by scoring the 101st goal of the season in a 5–0 victory over St. Pauli. The record would be broken in the same match by Leon Goretzka. Four days later, he became the youngest German player to reach 50 Champions League appearances in a 4–3 victory over Real Madrid, surpassing Thomas Müller, aged 23 years and 48 days. He would assist the decisive 3–3 in the 89th minute by Luis Díaz.

==== 2026–2027 season ====
During preseason, in August 2026, Musiala collapsed during consecutive friendly matches against RB Leipzig and Heidenheim respectively. After the second incident, he posted to Instagram that he had been "diagnosed with temporary, brief, but easily treatable absence seizures, which are due to a neurological dysfunction". He wrote that the incidents can look "scary", but they were "currently just part of my everyday life" and that he was receiving treatment. Ahead of the Franz Beckenbauer Supercup, where Musiala was left out of the squad, coach Vincent Kompany clarified that the club and the players have known about his diagnosis long before it was made public. Kompany added that Musiala's episodes of collapse were due to medication change and Musiala has been training continuously.

Musiala played his first game of the season in a scoreless away draw against FC Schalke 04, subbing in at the 57th-minute. On 10 September 2026, he scored his first goal of the season in a 5–0 Champions League victory over Bodø/Glimt in the opening match, before being substituted in the second half. He played his first full game of the season in Bayern Munich's win 7–0 over Union Berlin, providing the opening goal.

== International career ==
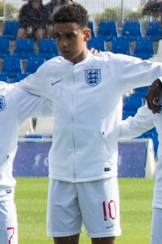
Musiala with England's U17 side in 2019

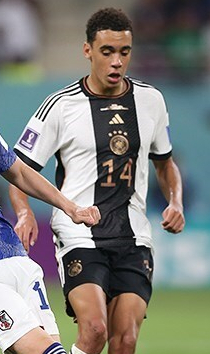
Musiala with Germany at the 2022 World Cup

=== Youth ===
In November 2020, Musiala was called up to the England U21 squad for the first time for their 2021 UEFA European Under-21 Championship qualification matches. He made his U21 debut as a substitute during a 3–1 victory over the Andorra U21s at Molineux Stadium on 13 November 2020. He scored his first under-21 goal during a 5–0 win over Albania also at Molineux Stadium on 17 November 2020. After choosing to represent England's U21s, the German football association indicated that they had stopped pursuing Musiala, with German youth team coach Meikel Schönweitz stating: "He [Musiala] has clearly signaled to us that he currently sees his future with the English national teams. We accept his decision and wish him all the best for his sporting career." Musiala had previously indicated that he felt more comfortable playing for England at youth level than for Germany, as he grew up as a footballer at Chelsea with other English players, whereas for Germany, he did not know any of the other players.

=== Senior ===
On 24 February 2021, Musiala announced he had decided to represent his mother's nation and his birth nation Germany at the international level. He subsequently received his first call up to the senior team for the 2022 FIFA World Cup qualifiers in March 2021, making his debut on 25 March 2021 as a 79th minute substitute in a 3–0 win against Iceland. According to former Germany coach Joachim Löw, he promised Musiala a call-up for the UEFA Euro 2020 if he chooses Germany over England. Löw said "It was the only time in my time as national team coach that I made a promise to a player: even though he wasn't a regular at Bayern, I told him that if he chose us, he would definitely be playing at Euro 2020 in the summer."

==== UEFA Euro 2020 ====
On 19 May 2021, Musiala was selected to the German squad for UEFA Euro 2020. On 23 June 2021, he became the youngest German player to feature in a major tournament for the Germany national team in a 2–2 draw with Hungary, aged 18 years and 117 days. During the match, Musiala set up Leon Goretzka's late equalizer which sent Germany through to the round of 16. He was brought on as a substitute in the round of 16 game against England, which Germany lost.

While with the team for Euro 2020, Musiala received the nickname "Bambi" from teammate Leroy Sané due to his youth and kindly demeanor. While Musiala has since suggested that he has outgrown the nickname, it remains popular with fans.

==== 2022 World Cup qualification ====
On 11 October 2021, Musiala scored his first senior international goal in a 4–0 win over North Macedonia, becoming the second-youngest player to score for the Germany national team, aged 18 years and 227 days, only behind Marius Hiller, aged 17 years and 241 days, in 1910.

==== 2022 FIFA World Cup ====
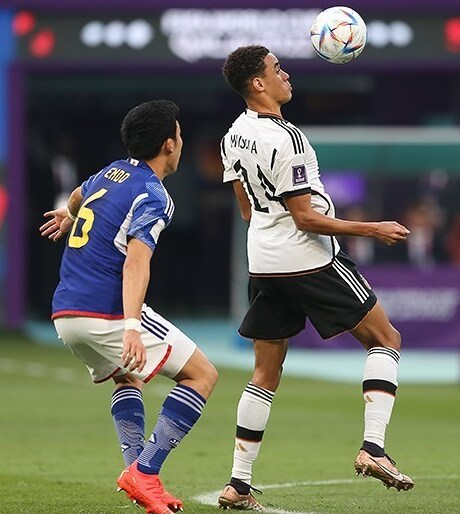
Musiala controlling a ball for Germany against Japan in the 2022 FIFA World Cup

On 10 November 2022, Musiala received a call-up for the 2022 FIFA World Cup in Qatar. On 23 November, he made his World Cup debut by starting against Japan, to become the first German teenager to feature in the competition since 1958, and the fourth youngest German player, aged 19 years and 270 days, in all World Cup participations, only behind: Karl-Heinz Schnellinger, Leopold Neumer and Edmund Conen. In the same match, Youssoufa Moukoko was subbed on in the 90th minute, to be the youngest ever, and Musiala then became the fifth. On 1 December, he completed 13 dribbles, two shy of Jay-Jay Okocha's record of 15 in 1994, in a 4–2 win over Costa Rica, yet Germany were eliminated in the group stage for the second successive World Cup as they finished third in their group.

==== UEFA Euro 2024 ====
On 7 June 2024, Musiala was named in Germany's squad for UEFA Euro 2024 on home soil. On 14 June, he was awarded Player of the Match in the opening encounter against Scotland, where he scored a goal in a 5–1 victory, becoming the second youngest German player to score in the tournament, 67 days older than his teammate Florian Wirtz. He scored in the 68th minute for Germany against Denmark in the round of 16 game on 29 June. On 5 July, Musiala played the full game as Germany were eliminated by eventual champions Spain in the quarter-finals. With three goals in the tournament, Musiala was awarded the Golden Boot in a six-way tie.

==== 2026 FIFA World Cup ====
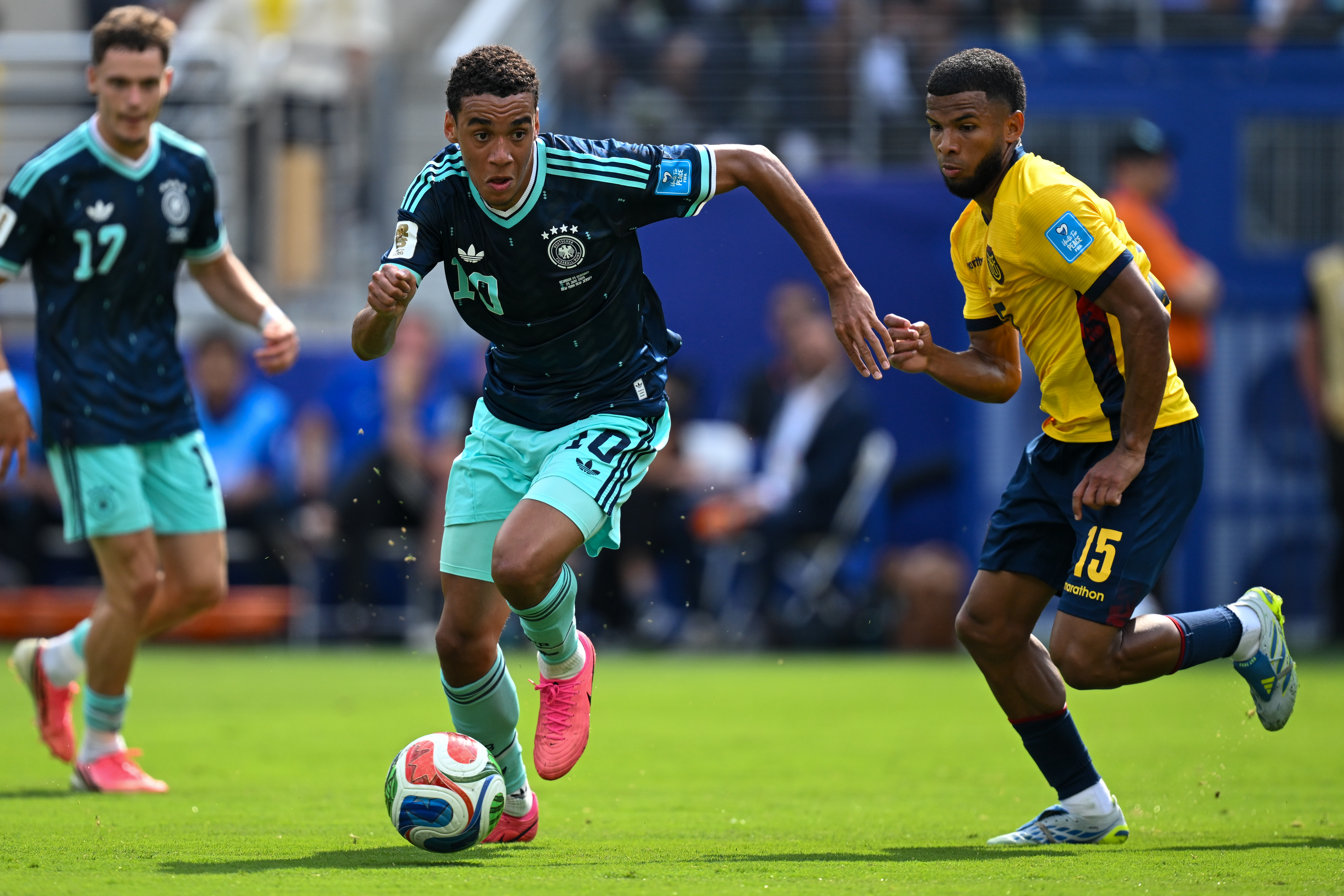
Musiala during Ecuador v Germany at the 2026 FIFA World Cup

On 21 May 2026, Musiala was selected in Germany's 26-man squad for the 2026 FIFA World Cup. On 14 June, he scored his first ever World Cup goal for Germany in their opening match, a 7–1 win over Curaçao.

== Style of play ==
A versatile player, Musiala can play in any attacking or midfield position, though he prefers to play on the left side of the field. Musiala is known for his close-control dribbling and can beat opponents with feints and tricks. He is also known for his vision and accurate passing. Hansi Flick, his former coach at Bayern Munich, stated, "He has a great eye and feeling for choosing the right spaces. He is very confident on the ball and can play well between the lines." Musiala has been widely described as one of the best young players in the world.

== Career statistics ==
=== Club ===
As of match played 20 November 2026

Appearances and goals by club, season and competition
Club	Season	League			DFB-Pokal		Europe		Other		Total	
Club	Season	Division	Apps	Goals	Apps	Goals	Apps	Goals	Apps	Goals	Apps	Goals
Bayern Munich II	2019–20	3. Liga	8	2	—		—		—		8	2
Bayern Munich II	2020–21	3. Liga	2	0	—		—		—		2	0
Bayern Munich II	Total		10	2	—		—		—		10	2
Bayern Munich	2019–20	Bundesliga	1	0	0	0	0	0	0	0	1	0
Bayern Munich	2020–21	Bundesliga	26	6	2	0	6 (Note: Appearances in UEFA Champions League)	1	3 (Note: One appearance in DFL-Supercup, two appearances in FIFA Club World Cup)	0	37	7
Bayern Munich	2021–22	Bundesliga	30	5	1	2	8	1	1 (Note: Appearance in DFL-Supercup)	0	40	8
Bayern Munich	2022–23	Bundesliga	33	12	4	3	9	0	1	1	47	16
Bayern Munich	2023–24	Bundesliga	24	10	2	0	11	2	1	0	38	12
Bayern Munich	2024–25	Bundesliga	25	12	3	3	12	3	4 (Note: Appearances in FIFA Club World Cup)	3	44	21
Bayern Munich	2025–26	Bundesliga	15	3	3	0	6	2	0	0	24	5
Bayern Munich	2026–27	Bundesliga	4	1	0	0	1	1	0	0	5	2
Bayern Munich	Total		158	49	15	8	53	10	10	4	236	71
Career total			168	51	15	8	53	10	10	4	246	73

=== International ===
As of match played 29 June 2026

Appearances and goals by national team and year
National team	Year	Apps	Goals
Germany	2021	9	1
Germany	2022	11	0
Germany	2023	5	1
Germany	2024	13	5
Germany	2025	2	1
Germany	2026	6	2
Total		46	10

As of match played 14 June 2026
Germany score listed first, score column indicates score after each Musiala goal

List of international goals scored by Jamal Musiala
No.	Date	Venue	Cap	Opponent	Score	Result	Competition	Ref.
1	11 October 2021	Toše Proeski Arena, Skopje, North Macedonia	9	North Macedonia	4–0	4–0	2022 FIFA World Cup qualification	
2	14 October 2023	Pratt & Whitney Stadium, East Hartford, United States	24	United States	3–1	3–1	Friendly	
3	14 June 2024	Allianz Arena, Munich, Germany	30	Scotland	2–0	5–1	UEFA Euro 2024	
4	19 June 2024	MHPArena, Stuttgart, Germany	31	Hungary	1–0	2–0	UEFA Euro 2024	
5	29 June 2024	Westfalenstadion, Dortmund, Germany	33	Denmark	2–0	2–0	UEFA Euro 2024	
6	7 September 2024	Merkur Spiel-Arena, Düsseldorf, Germany	35	Hungary	2–0	5–0	2024–25 UEFA Nations League A	
7	16 November 2024	Europa-Park Stadion, Freiburg, Germany	37	Bosnia and Herzegovina	1–0	7–0	2024–25 UEFA Nations League A	
8	23 March 2025	Westfalenstadion, Dortmund, Germany	40	Italy	2–0	3–3	2024–25 UEFA Nations League A	
9	31 May 2026	Mewa Arena, Mainz, Germany	41	Finland	4–0	4–0	Friendly	
10	14 June 2026	NRG Stadium, Houston, United States	43	Curaçao	4–1	7–1	2026 FIFA World Cup	

== Honours ==
Bayern Munich

- Bundesliga: 2019–20, 2020–21, 2021–22, 2022–23, 2024–25, 2025–26
- DFB-Pokal: 2025–26
- DFL-Supercup: 2020, 2021, 2022
- UEFA Champions League: 2019–20
- UEFA Super Cup: 2020
- FIFA Club World Cup: 2020

Bayern Munich II

- 3. Liga: 2019–20

Individual

- IFFHS Men's Youth (U20) World Team: 2021, 2022, 2023
- Bundesliga Rookie of the Month: April 2021
- Bundesliga Goal of the Month: March 2024, November 2024, February 2025
- Bundesliga Team of the Season: 2022–23, 2023–24, 2024–25
- kicker Bundesliga Team of the Season: 2021–22, 2022–23
- VDV Bundesliga Team of the Season: 2022–23, 2023–24, 2024–25
- Germany national Player of the Year: 2022, 2024
- Kopa Trophy runner-up: 2023
- UEFA European Championship top scorer: 2024 (shared)
- UEFA European Championship Team of the Tournament: 2024
