= Tarek Buchmann =

German footballer (born 2005)

Personal information
- Full name: Tarek Noah Buchmann
- Date of birth: 28 February 2005 (age 21)
- Place of birth: Dillingen an der Donau, Germany
- Height: 1.88 m (6 ft 2 in)
- Position: Centre-back

Team information
- Current team: Bayern Munich II

Youth career
- –2014: FC Lauingen
- 2014–2019: FC Augsburg
- 2019–2023: Bayern Munich

Senior career*
| Years | Team | Apps | (Gls) |
| 2023– | Bayern Munich II | 6 | (0) |
| 2023– | Bayern Munich | 0 | (0) |
| 2025–2026 | → 1. FC Nürnberg (loan) | 2 | (0) |
| 2025–2026 | → 1. FC Nürnberg II (loan) | 4 | (0) |

International career^{‡}
| 2020 | Germany U16 | 2 | (0) |
| 2022 | Germany U17 | 10 | (0) |
| 2023 | Germany U18 | 1 | (0) |
- * Club domestic league appearances and goals as of 26 April 2026 ‡ National team caps and goals as of 20 November 2023

Tarek Noah Buchmann (born 28 February 2005) is a German professional footballer who plays as a centre-back for Regionalliga Bayern club Bayern Munich II.

== Club career ==
=== Early career ===
Born in Dillingen an der Donau, Buchmann started playing football with German side FC Lauingen at a young age. He then joined the youth academy of his hometown club FC Augsburg.

=== Bayern Munich ===
On 16 June 2023, Buchmann was promoted to the senior squad of Bundesliga club Bayern Munich after signing his first professional contract until 2026.

On 29 August 2023, he made his professional debut in a Regionalliga Bayern match, starting the game for Bayern Munich II against DJK Vilzing which ended on a 3–2 defeat. In the 2023–24 season, he sustained recurring muscular injuries which forced him to miss the first half of the campaign. In February 2024, he sustained another torn muscle for the fourth time in seven months which sidelined him for the remainder of the season.

==== Loan to 1. FC Nürnberg ====
On 5 August 2025, Buchmann moved on a one-year loan to 2. Bundesliga club 1. FC Nürnberg for the 2025–26 season. He made his debut with the club on 14 March 2026, starting for a 3–2 away win 2. Bundesliga match against Holstein Kiel. Buchmann finished his loan-spell with two appearances for the first team in the second division, and four appearances for the reserve team in the fourth division, before returning to Bayern Munich.

== International career ==
He holds dual German and Togolese citizenship, making him eligible to represent either nation, and has represented Germany internationally at youth level.

== Style of play ==
Buchmann is right-footed, operates as a defender and is known for his speed. Mainly a centre-back, he can also be deployed as a right-back.

== Personal life ==
Buchmann was born to a Togolese father and German mother.

== Career statistics ==
As of match played 26 April 2026

Appearances and goals by club, season and competition
| Club | Season | League | | | Cup | | Total | |
| Club | Season | Division | Apps | Goals | Apps | Goals | Apps | Goals |
|---|---|---|---|---|---|---|---|---|
| Bayern Munich II | 2023–24 | Regionalliga Bayern | 2 | 0 | — | | 2 | 0 |
| Bayern Munich II | 2024–25 | Regionalliga Bayern | 2 | 0 | — | | 2 | 0 |
| Bayern Munich II | 2025–26 | Regionalliga Bayern | 2 | 0 | — | | 2 | 0 |
| Bayern Munich II | Total | | 6 | 0 | — | | 6 | 0 |
| Bayern Munich | 2023–24 | Bundesliga | 0 | 0 | 0 | 0 | 0 | 0 |
| Bayern Munich | 2024–25 | Bundesliga | 0 | 0 | 0 | 0 | 0 | 0 |
| Bayern Munich | Total | | 0 | 0 | 0 | 0 | 0 | 0 |
| 1. FC Nürnberg (loan) | 2025–26 | 2. Bundesliga | 2 | 0 | 0 | 0 | 2 | 0 |
| 1. FC Nürnberg II (loan) | 2025–26 | Regionalliga Bayern | 4 | 0 | — | | 4 | 0 |
| Career total | | | 12 | 0 | 0 | 0 | 12 | 0 |

== Honours ==
Bayern Munich

- Bundesliga: 2024–25

Individual

- Fritz Walter Medal U17 Bronze: 2022
