= 2025–26 FC Bayern Munich season =

127th season in existence of FC Bayern Munich

Bayern Munich
2025–26 season
- President: Herbert Hainer
- Head coach: Vincent Kompany
- Stadium: Allianz Arena
- Bundesliga: 1st
- DFB-Pokal: Winners
- Franz Beckenbauer Supercup: Winners
- UEFA Champions League: Semi-finals
- Top goalscorer: League: Harry Kane (36); All: Harry Kane (61)
- Average home league attendance: 75,000
- Biggest win: Bayern Munich 8–1 VfL Wolfsburg; 11 January 2026, Bundesliga
- Biggest defeat: Arsenal 3–1 Bayern Munich; 26 November 2025, Champions League
Home colours	Away colours	Third colours

The 2025–26 season was the 127th season in the history of Bayern Munich, and the club's 61st consecutive season in the top flight of German football. In addition to the domestic league, the club participated in this season's editions of the DFB-Pokal, the Franz Beckenbauer Supercup, and the UEFA Champions League.

The season was the first since 2007–08 without club legend and record appearance holder Thomas Müller, who had won 34 major trophies throughout his career, making him the most decorated German footballer of all time. The season was also the first since 2014–15 without Kingsley Coman, as he joined Saudi club Al-Nassr, as well as the first since 2019–20 without Leroy Sané, as he joined Turkish champions Galatasaray when his contract expired.

On 29 October 2025, Bayern broke AC Milan's record in 1992–93 of winning the first 13 matches of the season for the best start in Europe's top five leagues, after surpassing their own 2012–13 record of 12 matches by beating 1. FC Köln with a score line of 1–4. They further extended the record to 16 consecutive victories by 4 November by beating Paris Saint-Germain 1–2.

On 11 April 2026, Bayern recorded a 5–0 away victory against FC St. Pauli on matchday 29, bringing their season tally to 105 goals and surpassing their previous record of 101 goals set in the 1971–72 season. A week later, on 19 April, Bayern won the 2025–26 Bundesliga, achieving the club's 35th league title earlier before the season's end, during the match day 30, winning 4–2 at home over VfB Stuttgart. Two days later, Michael Wiesinger was appointed as head of sport and youth development at the FC Bayern Campus.

On the final matchday of the season, Bayern recorded a 5–1 victory over 1. FC Köln, finishing the Bundesliga campaign with a record 122 goals with in 34 games, the second-highest tally in a top-five European league season, behind Torino's 125 goals in the 21-team 1947–48 Serie A season.

== Players ==
As of 25 April 2026

Note: Flags indicate national team as defined under FIFA eligibility rules; some limited exceptions apply. Players may hold more than one non-FIFA nationality.

No.	Pos.	Nation	Player
1	GK	GER	Manuel Neuer (captain)
2	DF	FRA	Dayot Upamecano
3	DF	KOR	Kim Min-jae
4	DF	GER	Jonathan Tah
6	MF	GER	Joshua Kimmich (vice-captain)
7	FW	GER	Serge Gnabry
8	MF	GER	Leon Goretzka (3rd captain)
9	FW	ENG	Harry Kane
10	MF	GER	Jamal Musiala
11	FW	SEN	Nicolas Jackson (on loan from Chelsea)
14	FW	COL	Luis Díaz
17	FW	FRA	Michael Olise
19	DF	CAN	Alphonso Davies
20	MF	GER	Tom Bischof
21	DF	JPN	Hiroki Itō
22	DF	POR	Raphaël Guerreiro
26	GK	GER	Sven Ulreich
27	MF	AUT	Konrad Laimer

No.	Pos.	Nation	Player
30	DF	GER	Cassiano Kiala
31	MF	ITA	Guido Della Rovere
33	FW	GER	Bastian Assomo
34	DF	TUR	Deniz Ofli
35	GK	GER	Jannis Bärtl
36	FW	GER	Wisdom Mike
37	GK	GER	Leonard Prescott
38	MF	GER	Erblin Osmani
39	MF	SEN	Bara Ndiaye (on loan from Gambinos Stars Africa)
40	GK	GER	Jonas Urbig
41	DF	GER	Vincent Manuba
42	MF	GER	Lennart Karl
43	DF	CRO	Filip Pavić
44	DF	CRO	Josip Stanišić
45	MF	GER	Aleksandar Pavlović
47	MF	POR	David Santos Daiber
48	GK	GER	Leon Klanac
49	FW	BRA	Maycon Cardozo

== Transfers ==
=== In ===
Date	Pos.	Player	From	Type	Fee	Ref.
30 June 2025	FW	(France) Mathys Tel	(England) Tottenham Hotspur	Loan return	—N/a	
30 June 2025	MF	(Germany) Arijon Ibrahimović	(Italy) Lazio	Loan return	—N/a	
30 June 2025	DF	(Sweden) Matteo Pérez Vinlöf	Austria Wien	Loan return	—N/a	
30 June 2025	FW	(Spain) Bryan Zaragoza	(Spain) Osasuna	Loan return	—N/a	
30 June 2025	MF	(Germany) Paul Wanner	(Germany) 1. FC Heidenheim	Loan return	—N/a	
30 June 2025	MF	(Croatia) Lovro Zvonarek	(Austria) Sturm Graz	Loan return	—N/a	
30 June 2025	MF	(South Korea) Lee Hyun-ju	(Germany) Hannover 96	Loan return	—N/a	
30 June 2025	FW	(Luxembourg) David Jonathans	(Netherlands) Den Bosch	Loan return	—N/a	
30 June 2025	GK	(Germany) Tom Ritzy Hülsmann	(Austria) SKN St. Pölten	Loan return	—N/a	
30 June 2025	GK	(Germany) Lukas Schneller	(Germany) 1. FC Schweinfurt 05	Loan return	—N/a	
30 June 2025	MF	(Jordan) Yousef Qashi	(Germany) Wuppertaler SV	Loan return	—N/a	
30 June 2025	DF	(Germany) Benedikt Wimmer	(Germany) Wuppertaler SV	Loan return	—N/a	
30 June 2025	MF	(Georgia (country)) Luka Parkadze	(Germany) VSG Altglienicke	Loan return	—N/a	
30 June 2025	MF	(United States) Robert Deziel Jr.	(Germany) VSG Altglienicke	Loan return	—N/a	
30 June 2025	FW	(Germany) Gibson Adu	(Germany) SpVgg Unterhaching	Loan return	—N/a	
30 June 2025	DF	(Germany) Maximilian Hennig	(Germany) SpVgg Unterhaching	Loan return	—N/a	
30 June 2025	FW	(Australia) Nestory Irankunda	(Switzerland) Grasshoppers	Loan return	—N/a	
30 June 2025	GK	(Germany) Jannis Bärtl	(Germany) Karlsruher SC	Loan return	—N/a	
30 June 2025	FW	(Serbia) Marko Popović	(Germany) Türkgücü München	Loan return	—N/a	
30 June 2025	DF	(Austria) David Heindl	(Austria) Kapfenberger SV	Transfer	Undisclosed	
30 June 2025	FW	(Germany) Bastian Assomo	(Germany) Hertha BSC	Transfer	Undisclosed	
30 June 2025	DF	(Germany) Benno Schmitz	(Switzerland) Grasshoppers	Transfer	Undisclosed	
30 June 2025	DF	(Germany) Jonathan Tah	(Germany) Bayer Leverkusen	Transfer	Free	
30 June 2025	FW	(Germany) Anton Heinz	(Germany) Alemannia Aachen	Transfer	Free	
30 June 2025	FW	(Germany) Artur Degraf	(Germany) SSV Ulm	Transfer	Free	
30 July 2025	FW	(Colombia) Luis Díaz	(England) Liverpool	Transfer	€70,000,000	
1 August 2025	DF	(United States) Grayson Dettoni	(Switzerland) Grasshoppers	Anticipated loan return	—N/a	
1 September 2025	FW	(Senegal) Nicolas Jackson	(England) Chelsea	Loan	€16,500,000	
20 September 2025	FW	(Germany) Gibson Adu	(Austria) Rheindorf Altach	Anticipated loan return	—N/a	
3 January 2026	MF	(Senegal) Bara Ndiaye	(The Gambia) Gambinos Stars	Loan	Undisclosed	
9 January 2026	DF	(Germany) Allan Bohomo	—N/a	Transfer	Free	
30 January 2026	MF	(Germany) Mudaser Sadat	(Austria) SKU Amstetten	Anticipated loan return	—N/a	
2 February 2026	MF	(Nigeria) David Emmanuel	(Germany) KSV Hessen Kassel	Anticipated loan return	—N/a	

Total spending: ▼€86.5M

=== Out ===
Date	Pos.	Player	To	Type	Fee	Ref.
30 June 2025	DF	(England) Eric Dier	(France) Monaco	End of contract		
30 June 2025	FW	(Germany) Leroy Sané	(Turkey) Galatasaray	End of contract		
30 June 2025	DF	(Germany) Angelo Brückner	(Germany) SpVgg Bayreuth	End of contract		
30 June 2025	FW	(Turkey) Emirhan Demircan	(Netherlands) Utrecht	Transfer	Free	
30 June 2025	MF	(Turkey) Can Paylan	(Germany) Ingolstadt 04	Transfer	Free	
30 June 2025	DF	(Germany) Iwinosa Uhuns	(Germany) Ingolstadt 04	Transfer	Free	
30 June 2025	FW	(Germany) Sejdo Durakov	(Germany) Rot-Weiß Erfurt	Transfer	Free	
30 June 2025	FW	(France) Mathys Tel	(England) Tottenham Hotspur	Transfer	€35,000,000	
30 June 2025	MF	(Croatia) Gabriel Vidović	(Croatia) Dinamo Zagreb	Transfer	Undisclosed	
30 June 2025	DF	(Sweden) Matteo Pérez Vinlöf	(Croatia) Dinamo Zagreb	Transfer	Undisclosed	
30 June 2025	MF	(Denmark) Jonathan Asp Jensen	(Switzerland) Grasshoppers	Loan	—N/a	
30 June 2025	MF	(Germany) Arijon Ibrahimović	(Germany) 1. FC Heidenheim	Loan	—N/a	
30 June 2025	DF	(Germany) Paul Scholl	(Germany) Karlsruher SC	Loan	—N/a	
30 June 2025	DF	(Germany) Max Scholze	(Germany) SSV Ulm	Transfer	Undisclosed	
30 June 2025	MF	(Germany) Nico Anand	(Germany) Jahn Regensburg	Transfer	Undisclosed	
1 July 2025	MF	(Bulgaria) Valentin Yotov	(Gibraltar) Glacis United	End of contract		
1 July 2025	MF	(Germany) Moritz Mosandl	Retired			
1 July 2025	FW	(Germany) Samuel Unsöld	(Germany) Stuttgarter Kickers	End of contract		
1 July 2025	MF	(Germany) Liul-Bruke Alemu	—N/a	End of contract		
1 July 2025	MF	(Germany) Lennard Becker	(Germany) Hallescher FC	End of contract		
1 July 2025	DF	(Kosovo) Erion Rexhepi	—N/a	End of contract		
1 July 2025	GK	(Germany) Alexander Coenen	(Germany) SpVgg Unterhaching	End of contract		
1 July 2025	DF	(Germany) Elias Muteba	(Austria) SV Ried	End of contract		
1 July 2025	MF	(Turkey) Baran Özmen	(Germany) Türkgücü München	End of contract		
1 July 2025	GK	(Germany) Benjamin Ballis	(Austria) Wacker Innsbruck	Transfer	Free	
1 July 2025	GK	(Turkey) Luca Stančić	(Turkey) İstanbul Başakşehir	Transfer	Free	
1 July 2025	MF	(Germany) Maurice Krattenmacher	(Germany) Hertha BSC	Loan	—N/a	
1 July 2025	GK	(Germany) Max Schmitt	(Germany) SSV Ulm	Loan	—N/a	
2 July 2025	DF	(Germany) Maximilian Hennig	(Austria) TSV Hartberg	Loan	—N/a	
2 July 2025	MF	(Jordan) Yousef Qashi	(Jordan) Al-Hussein	Contract termination		
10 July 2025	DF	(Germany) Benedikt Wimmer	(Germany) SV Sandhausen	Loan	—N/a	
13 July 2025	FW	(Germany) Thomas Müller	(Canada) Vancouver Whitecaps	End of contract		
15 July 2025	GK	(Germany) Tom Ritzy Hülsmann	(Austria) TSV Hartberg	Transfer	€1,800,000	
18 July 2025	FW	(Australia) Nestory Irankunda	(England) Watford	Transfer	€3,000,000	
21 July 2025	GK	(Israel) Daniel Peretz	(Germany) Hamburger SV	Loan	Undisclosed	
23 July 2025	MF	(South Korea) Lee Hyun-ju	(Portugal) Arouca	Transfer	€1,500,000	
24 July 2025	MF	(Germany) Davide Dell'Erba	(Italy) Novara	Transfer	Undisclosed	
25 July 2025	MF	(Germany) Luca Denk	(Netherlands) Emmen	Transfer	Undisclosed	
29 July 2025	DF	(Croatia) Gabriel Marušić	Austria Salzburg	Transfer	Undisclosed	
29 July 2025	DF	(Morocco) Adam Aznou	(England) Everton	Transfer	€9,000,000	
29 July 2025	MF	(Croatia) Lovro Zvonarek	(Switzerland) Grasshoppers	Loan	—N/a	
30 July 2025	FW	(Germany) Maximilian Wagner	(Germany) SV Sandhausen	Transfer	Undisclosed	
30 July 2025	FW	(Spain) Bryan Zaragoza	(Spain) Celta Vigo	Loan	Undisclosed	
3 August 2025	MF	(Portugal) João Palhinha	(England) Tottenham Hotspur	Loan	Undisclosed	
5 August 2025	DF	(Germany) Tarek Buchmann	(Germany) 1. FC Nürnberg	Loan	—N/a	
14 August 2025	GK	(Croatia) Anthony Pavlešić	(Croatia) NK Rudeš	Transfer	Undisclosed	
15 August 2025	FW	(France) Kingsley Coman	(Saudi Arabia) Al-Nassr	Transfer	€30,000,000	
22 August 2025	MF	(Germany) Paul Wanner	(Netherlands) PSV Eindhoven	Transfer	€15,000,000	
29 August 2025	MF	(Georgia (country)) Luka Parkadze	Austria Salzburg	Transfer	Free	
31 August 2025	FW	(Luxembourg) David Jonathans	(Luxembourg) Jeunesse Esch	Contract termination		
31 August 2025	FW	(Serbia) Marko Popović	(Canada) Whitecaps 2	Contract termination		
1 September 2025	GK	(Germany) Lukas Schneller	(Germany) SV Sandhausen	Transfer	Undisclosed	
1 September 2025	MF	(Turkey) Veis Yıldız	(Italy) Hellas Verona	Transfer	Undisclosed	
1 September 2025	FW	(Sweden) Jonah Kusi-Asare	(England) Fulham	Loan	€4,000,000	
5 September 2025	FW	(Germany) Gibson Adu	(Austria) Rheindorf Altach	Loan	—N/a	
5 September 2025	MF	(Germany) Mudaser Sadat	(Austria) SKU Amstetten	Loan	—N/a	
1 January 2026	FW	(Germany) Gibson Adu	(Germany) SpVgg Unterhaching	Loan	Undisclosed	
8 January 2026	GK	(Israel) Daniel Peretz	(England) Southampton	Loan	Undisclosed	
23 January 2026	MF	(Germany) Jussef Nasrawe	(Austria) SV Ried	Loan	Undisclosed	
31 January 2026	DF	(United States) Grayson Dettoni	(Germany) Darmstadt 98	Loan	Undisclosed	
31 January 2026	MF	(Spain) Javier Fernández	(Germany) 1. FC Nürnberg	Loan	Undisclosed	
1 February 2026	FW	(Germany) Richard Meier	(Germany) SpVgg Unterhaching	Loan	Undisclosed	
1 February 2026	MF	(Germany) Moritz Göttlicher	(Germany) VfL Bochum	Transfer	Undisclosed	
2 February 2026	MF	(Germany) Adin Ličina	(Italy) Juventus	Transfer	Undisclosed	
2 February 2026	FW	(Spain) Bryan Zaragoza	(Italy) Roma	Loan	Undisclosed	
2 February 2026	MF	(Peru) Felipe Chávez	(Germany) 1. FC Köln	Loan	Undisclosed	
2 February 2026	MF	(Austria) Magnus Dalpiaz	(Italy) AC Milan	Loan	Undisclosed	
4 February 2026	MF	(Germany) Max Mergner	(Austria) First Vienna	Transfer	Undisclosed	
5 February 2026	DF	(France) Sacha Boey	(Turkey) Galatasaray	Loan	€500,000	
15 February 2026	MF	(Nigeria) David Emmanuel	(Czech Republic) SK Kladno	Transfer	Undisclosed	

Total income: ▲€99.8M
Balance: ▲€14.3M

== Pre-season and friendlies ==
Win Draw Loss Fixtures

2 August 2025 Friendly	Bayern Munich	2–1	Lyon	Munich
15:30 CEST	Olise 53' (pen.), 62'; Laimer (yellow card) 67'	Report	Moreira (yellow card) 50'; Mata (yellow card) 52'; Gomes Rodríguez 83'; Matić (yellow card) 90+1'	Stadium: Allianz Arena; Attendance: 34,500; Referee: Florian Badstübner (Germany)

7 August 2025 Telekom Cup	Bayern Munich	4–0	Tottenham Hotspur	Munich
18:30 CEST	Kane 12'; Coman 61'; Karl 75'; Kusi-Asare 80'	Report	Romero (yellow card) 41'	Stadium: Allianz Arena; Attendance: 72,000; Referee: Robert Hartmann (Germany)

12 August 2025 Friendly	Grasshoppers	1–2	Bayern Munich	Zurich, Switzerland
18:00 CEST	Giandomenico 51'	Report	Karl 21'; Kusi-Asare 26'	Stadium: Letzigrund; Attendance: 23,691; Referee: Lionel Tschudi (Switzerland)

23 August 2025 Dream Match	Red Eagles Austria	1–3	Bayern Munich	Imst, Austria
15:00 CEST	Wibmer 78'	Report	Hentcho 30'; Snip 74' (pen.); Chemwor 80'	Stadium: Velly Arena

6 January 2026 Friendly	Red Bull Salzburg	0–5	Bayern Munich	Salzburg, Austria
15:00 CET		Report	Itō 45'; Karl 72', 88'; Chávez 75'; Bischof 90+2'	Stadium: Red Bull Arena; Attendance: 29,090; Referee: Christopher Jäger (Austria)

== Competitions ==
=== Overall record ===
Competition	First match	Last match	Starting round	Final position	Record							
Competition	First match	Last match	Starting round	Final position	Pld	W	D	L	GF	GA	GD	Win %
Bundesliga	22 August 2025	16 May 2026	Matchday 1	Winners	34	28	5	1	122	36	+86	82.35
DFB-Pokal	27 August 2025	23 May 2026	First round	Winners	6	6	0	0	17	5	+12	100.00
Franz Beckenbauer Supercup	16 August 2025		Final	Winners	1	1	0	0	2	1	+1	100.00
UEFA Champions League	17 September 2025	6 May 2026	League phase	Semi-finals	14	11	1	2	43	20	+23	78.57
Total					55	46	6	3	184	62	+122	83.64

Source: Soccerway

=== Bundesliga ===
==== League table ====
Pos	Team	Pld	W	D	L	GF	GA	GD	Pts	Qualification or relegation
1	Bayern Munich (C)	34	28	5	1	122	36	+86	89	Qualification for the Champions League league phase
2	Borussia Dortmund	34	22	7	5	70	34	+36	73	Qualification for the Champions League league phase
3	RB Leipzig	34	20	5	9	66	47	+19	65	Qualification for the Champions League league phase
4	VfB Stuttgart	34	18	8	8	71	49	+22	62	Qualification for the Champions League league phase
5	TSG Hoffenheim	34	18	7	9	65	52	+13	61	Qualification for the Europa League league phase (Note: The 2025–26 DFB-Pokal winners qualified for the Europa League league phase. Since the DFB-Pokal winners, Bayern Munich, qualified for the Champions League, the Europa League spot passed to the sixth-placed team, and the Conference League spot passed to the seventh-placed team.)

Source: Bundesliga
Rules for classification: 1) Points; 2) Goal difference; 3) Goals scored; 4) Head-to-head results; 5) Head-to-head away goals scored; 6) Away goals scored; 7) Play-off.
(Rules 4–6 only apply after home and away matches have been played between the tied teams.)
(C) Champions

==== Results summary ====
Overall								Home						Away					
Pld	W	D	L	GF	GA	GD	Pts	W	D	L	GF	GA	GD	W	D	L	GF	GA	GD
34	28	5	1	122	36	+86	89	14	2	1	68	19	+49	14	3	0	54	17	+37

Source: kicker.de

==== Results by round ====
Round	1	2	3	4	5	6	7	8	9	10	11	12	13	14	15	16	17	18	19	20	21	22	23	24	25	26	27	28	29	30	31	32	33	34
Ground	H	A	H	A	H	A	H	A	H	A	H	H	A	H	A	H	A	A	H	A	H	A	H	A	H	A	H	A	A	H	A	H	A	H
Result	W	W	W	W	W	W	W	W	W	D	W	W	W	D	W	W	W	W	L	D	W	W	W	W	W	D	W	W	W	W	W	D	W	W
Position	1	1	1	1	1	1	1	1	1	1	1	1	1	1	1	1	1	1	1	1	1	1	1	1	1	1	1	1	1	1	1	1	1	1
Points	3	6	9	12	15	18	21	24	27	28	31	34	37	38	41	44	47	50	50	51	54	57	60	63	66	67	70	73	76	79	82	83	86	89

Source: Bundesliga
A = Away; H = Home; W = Win; D = Draw; L = Loss

==== Matches ====
The league fixtures were released on 27 June 2025.

Win Draw Loss Fixtures

22 August 2025 1	Bayern Munich	6–0	RB Leipzig	Munich
20:30 CEST	Olise 27', 42', (yellow card) 87'; Díaz 32'; Tah (yellow card) 49'; Laimer (yellow card) 63'; Kane 64', 74', 78'; Kimmich (yellow card) 69'	Report	Orbán (yellow card) 34'	Stadium: Allianz Arena; Attendance: 75,000; Referee: Florian Badstübner

30 August 2025 2	FC Augsburg	2–3	Bayern Munich	Augsburg
18:30 CEST	Gouweleeuw (yellow card) 31'; Jakić 53'; Kömür 76'; Schlotterbeck (yellow card) 86'; Zesiger (yellow card) 90+8'	Report	Gnabry 28'; Díaz 45+4', (yellow card) 90+6'; Olise 48', (yellow card) 60'; Laimer (yellow card) 60'; Boey (yellow card) 90+7'	Stadium: WWK Arena; Attendance: 30,660; Referee: Florian Exner

13 September 2025 3	Bayern Munich	5–0	Hamburger SV	Munich
18:30 CEST	Gnabry 3'; Pavlović 9', (yellow card) 90+1'; Kane 26' (pen.), 63'; Upamecano (yellow card) 28'; Díaz 29'	Report	Soumahoro (yellow card) 1'; Muheim (yellow card) 87'	Stadium: Allianz Arena; Attendance: 75,000; Referee: Tobias Stieler

20 September 2025 4	TSG Hoffenheim	1–4	Bayern Munich	Sinsheim
15:30 CEST	Coufal (yellow card) 9', (goal) 82'	Report	Díaz (yellow card) 12'; Goretzka (yellow card) 29'; Kane 44', 48' (pen.), 77' (pen.); Gnabry 90+9'	Stadium: PreZero Arena; Attendance: 30,150; Referee: Robert Hartmann

26 September 2025 5	Bayern Munich	4–0	Werder Bremen	Munich
20:30 CEST	Gnabry (yellow card) 16'; Tah 22'; Kane 45' (pen.), 65'; Kimmich (yellow card) 65'; Laimer 87'	Report		Stadium: Allianz Arena; Attendance: 75,000; Referee: Frank Willenborg

4 October 2025 6	Eintracht Frankfurt	0–3	Bayern Munich	Frankfurt
18:30 CEST	Burkardt (yellow card) 79'	Report	Díaz 1', 84', (yellow card) 69'; Neuer (yellow card) 15'; Kane 27'	Stadium: Deutsche Bank Park; Attendance: 59,500; Referee: Daniel Siebert

18 October 2025 7	Bayern Munich	2–1	Borussia Dortmund	Munich
18:30 CEST	Kane 22'; Laimer (yellow card) 48'; Olise 79'	Report	Ryerson (yellow card) 20'; Anton (yellow card) 45'; Bensebaini (yellow card) 50'; Brandt 84'	Stadium: Allianz Arena; Attendance: 75,000; Referee: Bastian Dankert

25 October 2025 8	Borussia Mönchengladbach	0–3	Bayern Munich	Mönchengladbach
15:30 CEST	Castrop (red card) 19'	Report	Upamecano (yellow card) 28'; Díaz (yellow card) 38'; Kimmich 64'; Guerreiro 69'; Bischof (yellow card) 74'; Karl 81'	Stadium: Borussia-Park; Attendance: 54,042; Referee: Sascha Stegemann

1 November 2025 9	Bayern Munich	3–0	Bayer Leverkusen	Munich
18:30 CET	Gnabry 25'; Jackson 31'; Badé 44' (o.g.); Goretzka (yellow card) 90+1'	Report	Maza (yellow card) 65'	Stadium: Allianz Arena; Attendance: 75,000; Referee: Deniz Aytekin

8 November 2025 10	Union Berlin	2–2	Bayern Munich	Berlin
15:30 CET	Doekhi 27', 83', (yellow card) 88'; Haberer (yellow card) 36'	Report	Laimer (yellow card) 15'; Díaz 38'; Stanišić (yellow card) 63'; Olise (yellow card) 82'; Kane 90+3'	Stadium: Stadion An der Alten Försterei; Attendance: 22,012; Referee: Florian Exner

22 November 2025 11	Bayern Munich	6–2	SC Freiburg	Munich
15:30 CET	Karl 22'; Pavlović (yellow card) 40'; Olise 45+2', 84'; Upamecano 55'; Kane 60'; Jackson 78'	Report	Suzuki 12'; Manzambi 17'	Stadium: Allianz Arena; Attendance: 75,000; Referee: Sven Jablonski

29 November 2025 12	Bayern Munich	3–1	FC St. Pauli	Munich
15:30 CET	Guerreiro 44'; Tah (yellow card) 83'; Díaz 90+3'; Jackson 90+8'	Report	Hountondji 6'; Mets (yellow card) 39'	Stadium: Allianz Arena; Attendance: 75,000; Referee: Felix Zwayer

6 December 2025 13	VfB Stuttgart	0–5	Bayern Munich	Stuttgart
15:30 CET	Al-Dakhil (yellow card) 2'; Leweling (yellow card) 4'; Assignon (red card) 81'	Report	Laimer 11'; Bischof (yellow card) 39'; Upamecano (yellow card) 44'; Goretzka (yellow card) 58'; Díaz (yellow card) 62'; Kane 66', 82' (pen.), 88'; Stanišić 78'	Stadium: MHPArena; Attendance: 60,000; Referee: Tobias Stieler

14 December 2025 14	Bayern Munich	2–2	Mainz 05	Munich
17:30 CET	Karl 29'; Laimer (yellow card) 77'; Davies (yellow card) 83'; Kane 87' (pen.)	Report	Potulski 45+2', (yellow card) 85'; Da Costa (yellow card) 50'; Lee 67'	Stadium: Allianz Arena; Attendance: 75,000; Referee: Robin Braun

21 December 2025 15	1. FC Heidenheim	0–4	Bayern Munich	Heidenheim
17:30 CET		Report	Stanišić 15'; Olise 32'; Díaz 86'; Kane 90+2'	Stadium: Voith-Arena; Attendance: 15,000; Referee: Florian Badstübner

11 January 2026 16	Bayern Munich	8–1	VfL Wolfsburg	Munich
17:30 CET	Fischer 5' (o.g.); Díaz 30'; Olise 50', 76'; Jenz 53' (o.g.); Guerreiro 68'; Kane 69'; Goretzka 88'	Report	Pejčinović 13'; Svanberg (yellow card) 45+1'	Stadium: Allianz Arena; Attendance: 75,000; Referee: Tobias Reichel

14 January 2026 17	1. FC Köln	1–3	Bayern Munich	Cologne
20:30 CET	Maina 41'	Report	Gnabry 45+5'; Kim 71'; Karl 84'	Stadium: RheinEnergieStadion; Attendance: 50,000; Referee: Patrick Ittrich

17 January 2026 18	RB Leipzig	1–5	Bayern Munich	Leipzig
18:30 CET	Rômulo 20'; Seiwald (yellow card) 29'	Report	Gnabry 50'; Kane 67'; Tah 83'; Pavlović 85'; Olise 88'	Stadium: Red Bull Arena; Attendance: 47,800; Referee: Sascha Stegemann

24 January 2026 19	Bayern Munich	1–2	FC Augsburg	Munich
15:30 CET	Itō 23'; Tah (yellow card) 73'	Report	Chaves 75'; Massengo 81'	Stadium: Allianz Arena; Attendance: 75,000; Referee: Florian Exner

31 January 2026 20	Hamburger SV	2–2	Bayern Munich	Hamburg
18:30 CET	Remberg (yellow card) 23'; Vieira 34' (pen.); Vušković 53'; Muheim (yellow card) 55'; Sambi Lokonga (yellow card) 75'; Gocholeishvili (yellow card) 85'; Heuer Fernandes (yellow card) 90+3'; Capaldo (yellow card) 90+10'	Report	Kane 42', (yellow card) 87'; Díaz 46'; Kim (yellow card) 57'; Olise (yellow card) 90+5'; Kimmich (yellow card) 90+10'	Stadium: Volksparkstadion; Attendance: 57,000; Referee: Harm Osmers

8 February 2026 21	Bayern Munich	5–1	TSG Hoffenheim	Munich
17:30 CET	Olise (yellow card) 13'; Kane 20' (pen.), 45' (pen.); Díaz 45+2', 62', 89'; Tah (yellow card) 57'	Report	Prass (yellow card) 6'; Akpoguma (red card) 17'; Kramarić 35'; Avdullahu (yellow card) 44'	Stadium: Allianz Arena; Attendance: 75,000; Referee: Tobias Stieler

14 February 2026 22	Werder Bremen	0–3	Bayern Munich	Bremen
15:30 CET	Lynen (yellow card) 28'; Stark (yellow card) 37'; Puertas (yellow card) 90'	Report	Kane 22' (pen.), 26'; Goretzka 70'; Musiala (yellow card) 80'	Stadium: Weserstadion; Attendance: 42,100; Referee: Bastian Dankert

21 February 2026 23	Bayern Munich	3–2	Eintracht Frankfurt	Munich
15:30 CET	Pavlović 16'; Kane 20', 68'	Report	Bahoya (yellow card) 43'; Burkardt 77' (pen.); Kalimuendo 86'; Collins (yellow card) 90+2'; Amenda (yellow card) 90+8'	Stadium: Allianz Arena; Attendance: 75,000; Referee: Tobias Reichel

28 February 2026 24	Borussia Dortmund	2–3	Bayern Munich	Dortmund
18:30 CET	Schlotterbeck (yellow card) 20', (goal) 26'; Svensson 83'	Report	Kane 54', 70' (pen.); Kimmich 87'	Stadium: Signal Iduna Park; Attendance: 81,365; Referee: Sven Jablonski

6 March 2026 25	Bayern Munich	4–1	Borussia Mönchengladbach	Munich
20:30 CET	Díaz 33'; Laimer 45+1'; Musiala 57' (pen.); Jackson (yellow card) 66', (goal) 79'	Report	Reitz (red card) 55'; Mohya 89'	Stadium: Allianz Arena; Attendance: 75,000; Referee: Robert Schröder

14 March 2026 26	Bayer Leverkusen	1–1	Bayern Munich	Leverkusen
15:30 CET	García 6'; Fernández (yellow card) 56'; Andrich (yellow card) 74'; Tapsoba (yellow card) 90+5'	Report	Tah (yellow card) 32'; Jackson (red card) 42'; Díaz 69', (yellow card) 74' (yellow-red card) 84'; Ulreich (yellow card) 90+7'	Stadium: BayArena; Attendance: 30,210; Referee: Christian Dingert

21 March 2026 27	Bayern Munich	4–0	Union Berlin	Munich
15:30 CET	Upamecano (yellow card) 3'; Olise 43'; Gnabry 45+1', 67'; Kane 49'	Report	Querfeld (yellow card) 30'; Doekhi (yellow card) 37'	Stadium: Allianz Arena; Attendance: 75,000; Referee: Patrick Ittrich

4 April 2026 28	SC Freiburg	2–3	Bayern Munich	Freiburg
15:30 CEST	Ginter (yellow card) 29'; Manzambi 46'; Höler 71'; Atubolu (yellow card) 90+9'	Report	Tah (yellow card) 25'; Olise (yellow card) 73'; Bischof 81', 90+2'; Karl 90+9', (yellow card) 90+10'	Stadium: Europa-Park Stadion; Attendance: 34,700; Referee: Daniel Siebert

11 April 2026 29	FC St. Pauli	0–5	Bayern Munich	Hamburg
18:30 CEST	Fujita (yellow card) 53'	Report	Musiala 9'; Laimer (yellow card) 19'; Olise (yellow card) 52', (goal) 54'; Goretzka 53'; Jackson 65'; Guerreiro 88'	Stadium: Millerntor-Stadion; Attendance: 29,546; Referee: Tobias Stieler

19 April 2026 30	Bayern Munich	4–2	VfB Stuttgart	Munich
17:30 CEST	Guerreiro 31'; Jackson 33'; Davies 37'; Kane 52'	Report	Führich 21'; Andrés 88'	Stadium: Allianz Arena; Attendance: 75,000; Referee: Sören Storks

25 April 2026 31	Mainz 05	3–4	Bayern Munich	Mainz
15:30 CEST	Kohr 15', (yellow card) 20'; Nebel 29'; Becker 45+2'	Report	Laimer (yellow card) 33'; Jackson 53'; Olise 73', (yellow card) 90+7'; Musiala 81'; Kane 83'	Stadium: Mewa Arena; Attendance: 33,305; Referee: Martin Petersen

2 May 2026 32	Bayern Munich	3–3	1. FC Heidenheim	Munich
15:30 CEST	Goretzka 44', 57'; Jackson (yellow card) 45'; Tah (yellow card) 72'; Laimer (yellow card) 85'; Olise 90+10'	Report	Zivzivadze 22', 76'; Dinkçi 31'; Ramaj (yellow card) 44'; Busch (yellow card) 90'	Stadium: Allianz Arena; Attendance: 75,000; Referee: Frank Willenborg

9 May 2026 33	VfL Wolfsburg	0–1	Bayern Munich	Wolfsburg
18:30 CEST	Shiogai (yellow card) 90+1'	Report	Olise 56'	Stadium: Volkswagen Arena; Attendance: 28,917; Referee: Matthias Jöllenbeck

16 May 2026 34	Bayern Munich	5–1	1. FC Köln	Munich
15:30 CEST	Kane 10', 13', 69'; Bischof 22'; Laimer (yellow card) 37'; Jackson 83'	Report	El Mala 18'; Schmied (yellow card) 34'	Stadium: Allianz Arena; Attendance: 75,000; Referee: Deniz Aytekin

=== DFB-Pokal ===
The first round draw was held on 15 June 2025.

27 August 2025 First round	Wehen Wiesbaden	2–3	Bayern Munich	Wiesbaden
20:45 CEST	May (yellow card) 53'; Kaya 64', 69'	Report	Kane 16' (pen.), 90+4'; Pavlović (yellow card) 49'; Olise 51'	Stadium: Brita-Arena; Attendance: 12,500; Referee: Daniel Siebert

29 October 2025 Second round	1. FC Köln	1–4	Bayern Munich	Cologne
20:45 CET	El Mala (yellow card) 3'; Ache 31'	Report	Díaz 36', (yellow card) 45+2'; Kane 38', 64'; Olise 72'; Upamecano (yellow card) 85'	Stadium: RheinEnergieStadion; Attendance: 50,000; Referee: Tobias Welz

3 December 2025 Round of 16	Union Berlin	2–3	Bayern Munich	Berlin
20:45 CET	Querfeld 40' (pen.), 55' (pen.); Ansah (yellow card) 80'; Kemlein (yellow card) 87'; Burcu (yellow card) 90+2'	Report	Ansah 12' (o.g.); Kane 24', (yellow card) 54'; Leite 45+4' (o.g.); Upamecano (yellow card) 82'; Neuer (yellow card) 90+1'	Stadium: Stadion An der Alten Försterei; Attendance: 22,012; Referee: Martin Petersen

11 February 2026 Quarter-finals	Bayern Munich	2–0	RB Leipzig	Munich
20:45 CET	Stanišić (yellow card) 61'; Kane 64' (pen.); Díaz 67'; Pavlović (yellow card) 70'; Laimer (yellow card) 89'	Report	Vandevoordt (yellow card) 62'; Seiwald (yellow card) 69'; Rômulo (yellow card) 70'; Baumgartner (yellow card) 82'	Stadium: Allianz Arena; Attendance: 75,000; Referee: Daniel Siebert

22 April 2026 Semi-finals	Bayer Leverkusen	0–2	Bayern Munich	Leverkusen
20:45 CEST	Tapsoba (yellow card) 38'; Grimaldo (yellow card) 76'	Report	Kane 22'; Pavlović (yellow card) 43'; Díaz 90+3'	Stadium: BayArena; Attendance: 30,210; Referee: Felix Zwayer

23 May 2026 Final	Bayern Munich	3–0	VfB Stuttgart	Berlin
20:00 CEST	Kane 55', 80', 90+2' (pen.)	Report	Führich (yellow card) 54'; Chabot (yellow card) 82'	Stadium: Olympiastadion; Attendance: 74,036; Referee: Sven Jablonski

=== Franz Beckenbauer Supercup ===
16 August 2025 Final	VfB Stuttgart	1–2	Bayern Munich	Stuttgart
20:30 CEST	Mittelstädt (yellow card) 44'; Leweling 90+3'	Report	Kane 18', (yellow card) 57'; Upamecano (yellow card) 35'; Olise (yellow card) 45'; Díaz 77'	Stadium: MHPArena; Attendance: 60,000; Referee: Harm Osmers

=== UEFA Champions League ===
==== League phase ====
The league phase draw was held on 28 August 2025.

Pos	Team	Pld	W	D	L	GF	GA	GD	Pts	Qualification
1	(The Football Association) Arsenal	8	8	0	0	23	4	+19	24	Advance to round of 16 (seeded)
2	(German Football Association) Bayern Munich	8	7	0	1	22	8	+14	21	Advance to round of 16 (seeded)
3	(The Football Association) Liverpool	8	6	0	2	20	8	+12	18	Advance to round of 16 (seeded)
4	(The Football Association) Tottenham Hotspur	8	5	2	1	17	7	+10	17	Advance to round of 16 (seeded)
5	(Royal Spanish Football Federation) Barcelona	8	5	1	2	22	14	+8	16	Advance to round of 16 (seeded)

Source: UEFA
Rules for classification: League phase tiebreakers

Round	1	2	3	4	5	6	7	8
Ground	H	A	H	A	A	H	H	A
Result	W	W	W	W	L	W	W	W
Position	6	1	2	1	3	2	2	2
Points	3	6	9	12	12	15	18	21

Source: UEFA
A = Away; H = Home; W = Win; D = Draw; L = Loss

17 September 2025 1	Bayern Munich (Germany)	3–1	(England) Chelsea	Munich, Germany
21:00 CEST	Chalobah 20' (o.g.); Kane 27' (pen.), 63'; Tah (yellow card) 29'; Olise (yellow card) 85'; Laimer (yellow card) 85'	Report	Palmer 29'; Andrey Santos (yellow card) 90+6'	Stadium: Allianz Arena; Attendance: 75,000; Referee: José María Sánchez Martínez (Spain)

30 September 2025 2	Pafos (Cyprus)	1–5	(Germany) Bayern Munich	Limassol, Cyprus
21:00 CEST	Oršić 45', (yellow card) 46'	Report	Kane 15', 34'; Guerreiro 20'; Jackson 31'; Olise 68'	Stadium: Alphamega Stadium; Attendance: 9,187; Referee: Manfredas Lukjančukas (Lithuania)
Note: The match was played at Alphamega Stadium in Limassol, instead of Pafos' regular stadium, Stelios Kyriakides Stadium in Paphos, which did not meet UEFA requirements.

22 October 2025 3	Bayern Munich (Germany)	4–0	(Belgium) Club Brugge	Munich, Germany
21:00 CEST	Karl 5'; Kane 14'; Díaz 34'; Jackson 79'; Kim (yellow card) 90+1'	Report		Stadium: Allianz Arena; Attendance: 75,000; Referee: Donatas Rumšas (Lithuania)

4 November 2025 4	Paris Saint-Germain (France)	1–2	(Germany) Bayern Munich	Paris, France
21:00 CET	Neves 74'; Mendes (yellow card) 84'	Report	Díaz 4', 32', (red card) 45+3'; Bischof (yellow card) 47'; Neuer (yellow card) 49'; Stanišić (yellow card) 84'	Stadium: Parc des Princes; Attendance: 45,747; Referee: Maurizio Mariani (Italy)

26 November 2025 5	Arsenal (England)	3–1	(Germany) Bayern Munich	London, England
20:00 GMT	Timber 22'; Madueke 69'; Saliba (yellow card) 74'; Martinelli 77'; Merino (yellow card) 80'	Report	Upamecano (yellow card) 23'; Karl 32'; Laimer (yellow card) 43'	Stadium: Emirates Stadium; Attendance: 58,780; Referee: Marco Guida (Italy)

9 December 2025 6	Bayern Munich (Germany)	3–1	(Portugal) Sporting CP	Munich, Germany
18:45 CET	Gnabry 65'; Karl 69'; Kimmich (yellow card) 71'; Tah 77'; Laimer (yellow card) 90+4'	Report	Kimmich 54' (o.g.); Hjulmand (yellow card) 71'	Stadium: Allianz Arena; Attendance: 75,000; Referee: Nick Walsh (Scotland)

21 January 2026 7	Bayern Munich (Germany)	2–0	(Belgium) Union Saint-Gilloise	Munich, Germany
21:00 CET	Kim (yellow card) 18' (yellow-red card) 63'; Kane 52', 55' (pen.); Olise (yellow card) 58'	Report	David (yellow card) 66'	Stadium: Allianz Arena; Attendance: 66,000; Referee: Rade Obrenović (Slovenia)

28 January 2026 8	PSV Eindhoven (Netherlands)	1–2	(Germany) Bayern Munich	Eindhoven, Netherlands
21:00 CET	Perišić (yellow card) 7'; Schouten (yellow card) 35'; Saibari 78'; Til (yellow card) 83'; Mauro Júnior (yellow card) 86' (yellow-red card) 90+4'	Report	Upamecano (yellow card) 24'; Musiala 58'; Kimmich (yellow card) 83'; Kane 84'	Stadium: Philips Stadion; Attendance: 35,000; Referee: João Pinheiro (Portugal)

==== Knockout phase ====
===== Round of 16 =====
The draw for the round of 16 was held on 27 February 2026.

10 March 2026 First leg	Atalanta (Italy)	1–6	(Germany) Bayern Munich	Bergamo, Italy
21:00 CET	Musah (yellow card) 83'; Pašalić 90+3'	Report	Stanišić 12'; Olise 22', 64', (yellow card) 77'; Gnabry 25'; Laimer (yellow card) 39'; Jackson 52'; Musiala 67'; Kimmich (yellow card) 83'	Stadium: Stadio Atleti Azzurri d'Italia; Attendance: 22,557; Referee: Espen Eskås (Norway)

18 March 2026 Second leg	Bayern Munich (Germany)	4–1 (10–2 agg.)	(Italy) Atalanta	Munich, Germany
21:00 CET	Kane 25' (pen.), 54'; Karl 56'; Díaz 70'	Report	Samardžić 85'	Stadium: Allianz Arena; Attendance: 75,000; Referee: Benoît Bastien (France)

===== Quarter-finals =====
In the quarter-finals, the exact match pairings and order of legs were predetermined based on the tournament bracket.

7 April 2026 First leg	Real Madrid (Spain)	1–2	(Germany) Bayern Munich	Madrid, Spain
21:00 CEST	Tchouaméni (yellow card) 36'; Mbappé 74'	Report	Díaz 41', (yellow card) 77'; Kane 46'; Tah (yellow card) 71'; Neuer (yellow card) 82'; Musiala (yellow card) 86'	Stadium: Bernabéu; Attendance: 77,106; Referee: Michael Oliver (England)

15 April 2026 Second leg	Bayern Munich (Germany)	4–3 (6–4 agg.)	(Spain) Real Madrid	Munich, Germany
21:00 CEST	Pavlović 6'; Stanišić (yellow card) 29'; Kane 38'; Díaz 89'; Olise 90+4'	Report	Güler 1', 29', (yellow card) 90+5' (yellow-red card) 90+5'; Militão (yellow card) 40'; Mbappé 42'; Rüdiger (yellow card) 70'; Camavinga (yellow card) 78' (yellow-red card) 86'; Ceballos (yellow card) 90+1'	Stadium: Allianz Arena; Attendance: 75,000; Referee: Slavko Vinčić (Slovenia)
Note: Güler received a red card following the final whistle.

===== Semi-finals =====
In the semi-finals, the exact match pairings and order of legs were predetermined based on the tournament bracket.

28 April 2026 First leg	Paris Saint-Germain (France)	5–4	(Germany) Bayern Munich	Paris, France
21:00 CEST	Marquinhos (yellow card) 12'; Kvaratskhelia 24', 56'; Neves 33'; Dembélé 45+5' (pen.), 58'; Fabián (yellow card) 77'; Hakimi (yellow card) 80'	Report	Kane 17' (pen.); Olise 41'; Upamecano 65'; Díaz 68'	Stadium: Parc des Princes; Attendance: 47,511; Referee: Sandro Schärer (Switzerland)

6 May 2026 Second leg	Bayern Munich (Germany)	1–1 (5–6 agg.)	(France) Paris Saint-Germain	Munich, Germany
21:00 CEST	Tah (yellow card) 33'; Díaz (yellow card) 78'; Kane 90+4'; Kimmich (yellow card) 90+7'	Report	Dembélé 3'; Mendes (yellow card) 8'; Kvaratskhelia (yellow card) 45+3'; Marquinhos (yellow card) 86'	Stadium: Allianz Arena; Attendance: 75,000; Referee: João Pinheiro (Portugal)

== Statistics ==
=== Appearances and goals ===
No.	Pos	Nat	Player	Total		Bundesliga		DFB-Pokal		Franz Beckenbauer Supercup		Champions League	
No.	Pos	Nat	Player	Apps	Goals	Apps	Goals	Apps	Goals	Apps	Goals	Apps	Goals
Goalkeepers
1	GK	(Germany) GER	Manuel Neuer	37	0	22	0	3	0	1	0	11	0
26	GK	(Germany) GER	Sven Ulreich	1	0	1	0	0	0	0	0	0	0
40	GK	(Germany) GER	Jonas Urbig	20	0	11+3	0	3	0	0	0	3	0
48	GK	(Germany) GER	Leon Klanac	0	0	0	0	0	0	0	0	0	0
Defenders
2	DF	(France) FRA	Dayot Upamecano	42	2	21+3	1	5	0	1	0	12	1
3	DF	(South Korea) KOR	Kim Min-jae	37	1	19+6	1	1+2	0	0+1	0	3+5	0
4	DF	(Germany) GER	Jonathan Tah	49	3	23+5	2	6	0	1	0	13+1	1
19	DF	(Canada) CAN	Alphonso Davies	23	1	6+7	1	1+1	0	0	0	1+7	0
21	DF	(Japan) JPN	Hiroki Itō	23	1	10+6	1	0+3	0	0	0	1+3	0
22	DF	(Portugal) POR	Raphaël Guerreiro	29	6	8+10	5	1+2	0	0+1	0	4+3	1
30	DF	(Germany) GER	Cassiano Kiala	1	0	0+1	0	0	0	0	0	0	0
34	DF	(Turkey) TUR	Deniz Ofli	2	0	0+1	0	0	0	0	0	0+1	0
43	DF	(Croatia) CRO	Filip Pavić	1	0	0	0	0	0	0	0	0+1	0
44	DF	(Croatia) CRO	Josip Stanišić	43	3	19+7	2	5+1	0	1	0	10	1
Midfielders
6	MF	(Germany) GER	Joshua Kimmich	49	2	24+5	2	6	0	1	0	13	0
8	MF	(Germany) GER	Leon Goretzka	48	5	25+6	5	0+6	0	1	0	1+9	0
10	MF	(Germany) GER	Jamal Musiala	24	5	7+8	3	2+1	0	0	0	3+3	2
20	MF	(Germany) GER	Tom Bischof	38	3	14+12	3	0+1	0	0+1	0	3+7	0
27	MF	(Austria) AUT	Konrad Laimer	47	3	22+7	3	4+2	0	1	0	10+1	0
38	MF	(Germany) GER	Erblin Osmani	1	0	0+1	0	0	0	0	0	0	0
39	MF	(Senegal) SEN	Bara Ndiaye	4	0	2+2	0	0	0	0	0	0	0
42	MF	(Germany) GER	Lennart Karl	39	9	16+10	5	2+2	0	0+1	0	6+2	4
45	MF	(Germany) GER	Aleksandar Pavlović	44	4	17+8	3	5	0	0	0	14	1
47	MF	(Portugal) POR	David Santos Daiber	2	0	0+2	0	0	0	0	0	0	0
Forwards
7	FW	(Germany) GER	Serge Gnabry	37	10	16+5	8	2+2	0	1	0	7+4	2
9	FW	(England) ENG	Harry Kane	51	61	25+6	36	6	10	1	1	12+1	14
11	FW	(Senegal) SEN	Nicolas Jackson	34	11	12+11	8	0+1	0	0	0	3+7	3
14	FW	(Colombia) COL	Luis Díaz	51	26	27+5	15	6	3	1	1	12	7
17	FW	(France) FRA	Michael Olise	52	22	23+9	15	6	2	1	0	12+1	5
36	FW	(Germany) GER	Wisdom Mike	5	0	0+4	0	0	0	0	0	0+1	0
49	FW	(Brazil) BRA	Maycon Cardozo	2	0	0+2	0	0	0	0	0	0	0
Players transferred/loaned out during the season
23	DF	(France) FRA	Sacha Boey	15	0	5+4	0	1+1	0	0+1	0	0+3	0
38	MF	(Peru) PER	Felipe Chávez	2	0	0+2	0	0	0	0	0	0	0
41	FW	(Sweden) SWE	Jonah Kusi-Asare	1	0	0+1	0	0	0	0	0	0	0

Source: Competitions

=== Goalscorers ===
The list is sorted by squad number when total goals are equal.

Rank	No.	Pos.	Nat.	Player	Bundesliga	DFB-Pokal	Franz Beckenbauer Supercup	Champions League	Total
1	9	FW	(England)	Harry Kane	36	10	1	14	61
2	14	FW	(Colombia)	Luis Díaz	15	3	1	7	26
3	17	FW	(France)	Michael Olise	15	2	0	5	22
4	11	FW	(Senegal)	Nicolas Jackson	8	0	0	3	11
5	7	FW	(Germany)	Serge Gnabry	8	0	0	2	10
6	42	MF	(Germany)	Lennart Karl	5	0	0	4	9
7	22	DF	(Portugal)	Raphaël Guerreiro	5	0	0	1	6
8	10	MF	(Germany)	Jamal Musiala	3	0	0	2	5
8	8	MF	(Germany)	Leon Goretzka	5	0	0	0	5
10	45	MF	(Germany)	Aleksandar Pavlović	3	0	0	1	4
11	4	DF	(Germany)	Jonathan Tah	2	0	0	1	3
11	20	MF	(Germany)	Tom Bischof	3	0	0	0	3
11	27	MF	(Austria)	Konrad Laimer	3	0	0	0	3
11	44	DF	(Croatia)	Josip Stanišić	2	0	0	1	3
15	6	MF	(Germany)	Joshua Kimmich	2	0	0	0	2
15	2	DF	(France)	Dayot Upamecano	1	0	0	1	2
17	3	DF	(South Korea)	Kim Min-jae	1	0	0	0	1
17	19	DF	(Canada)	Alphonso Davies	1	0	0	0	1
17	21	DF	(Japan)	Hiroki Itō	1	0	0	0	1
Own goals					3	2	0	1	6
Totals					122	17	2	43	184

Source: Competitions

=== Assists ===
The list is sorted by squad number when total assists are equal.

Rank	No.	Pos.	Nat.	Player	Bundesliga	DFB-Pokal	Franz Beckenbauer Supercup	Champions League	Total
1	17	FW	(France)	Michael Olise	19	3	0	6	28
2	14	FW	(Colombia)	Luis Díaz	14	2	0	3	19
3	27	MF	(Austria)	Konrad Laimer	9	0	0	3	12
4	6	MF	(Germany)	Joshua Kimmich	8	2	0	2	12
5	7	FW	(Germany)	Serge Gnabry	6	0	1	5	12
6	10	MF	(Germany)	Jamal Musiala	4	1	0	1	6
6	9	FW	(England)	Harry Kane	5	0	0	2	7
6	42	MF	(Germany)	Lennart Karl	5	0	0	2	7
9	8	MF	(Germany)	Leon Goretzka	5	1	0	0	6
10	19	DF	(Canada)	Alphonso Davies	2	0	0	2	4
11	2	DF	(France)	Dayot Upamecano	0	0	0	3	3
11	11	FW	(Senegal)	Nicolas Jackson	1	0	0	2	3
11	44	DF	(Croatia)	Josip Stanišić	1	1	0	1	3
14	20	MF	(Germany)	Tom Bischof	2	0	0	0	2
14	21	DF	(Japan)	Hiroki Itō	2	0	0	0	2
14	22	DF	(Portugal)	Raphaël Guerreiro	2	0	0	0	2
14	45	MF	(Germany)	Aleksandar Pavlović	1	0	0	1	2
18	3	DF	(South Korea)	Kim Min-jae	1	0	0	0	1
18	4	DF	(Germany)	Jonathan Tah	1	0	0	0	1
Totals					89	10	1	32	132

Source: FBref.com
