= Yotov =

Yotov (Bulgarian: Йотов; feminine form Yotova (Bulgarian: Йотовa)), sometimes incorrectly transliterated as Iotov, is a Bulgarian surname. It is a patronymic based on the given name Yotov (Bulgarian: Йото). Notable people with this surname include:

== Iotov ==
- Iliana Iotova (born 1964), President of Bulgaria
- Valentin Iotov (born 1988), Bulgarian chess Grandmaster

== Yotov ==
- Boris Yotov (born 1996), Azerbaijani rower
- Darina Yotova, birth name of Bulgarian singer and ESC2026 winner Dara (born 1998)
- Gonos Yotov, also known as Gonos Yotas (1880–1911), Bulgarian-Greek fighter
- Tsvetan Yotov (born 1989), Bulgarian football player
- Valentin Yotov (footballer) (born 2006), Bulgarian footballer
- Velko Yotov, Bulgarian football player
- Yoto Yotov (born 1969), Bulgarian-Croatian weightlifter
