= Guido Della Rovere =

Italian footballer

Personal information
- Full name: Guido Della Rovere
- Date of birth: 4 June 2007 (age 19)
- Place of birth: Cremona, Italy
- Height: 1.87 m (6 ft 2 in)
- Position: Midfielder

Team information
- Current team: Bayern Munich II

Youth career
- Oratorio CavaDigiDue
- ASD Torrazzo Victor
- –2024: Cremonese

Senior career*
Years	Team	Apps	(Gls)
2024	Cremonese	1	(0)
2024–	Bayern Munich II	50	(5)
2026–	Bayern Munich	0	(0)

International career^{‡}
2022	Italy U15	3	(0)
2023	Italy U16	1	(0)
2024–	Italy U18	2	(0)
2025–	Italy U19	2	(0)
- * Club domestic league appearances and goals as of 23:45, 18 October 2026 (UTC) ‡ National team caps and goals as of 23:45, 9 September 2025 (UTC)

Guido Della Rovere (born 4 June 2007) is an Italian professional footballer who plays as a midfielder for Regionalliga Bayern club Bayern Munich II.

== Club career ==
=== Cremonese ===
The talented youngster made his first appearance for Cremonese with the primavera during a match against Feralpisalò in the second-highest youth division, Campionato Primavera 2, on 6 May 2023.

In early 2024, top-flight clubs showed interest in recruiting him, such as Serie A club Juventus, Dutch Eredivisie club Ajax, and German Bundesliga club Bayern Munich.

After good performances in the youth team, Della Rovere made his professional debut with the senior team on 10 May 2024, during a 3–0 home win against Cittadella on matchday 38 of Serie B, substituting César Falletti at the 64th minute of the game.

=== Bayern Munich ===
On 3 July 2024, he moved to Germany and joined Bundesliga giants Bayern Munich for an undisclosed fee, immediately joining the reserve team.

On 2 August 2024, Della Rovere made his debut with Bayern Munich II during a 2–1 away win Regionalliga Bayern match against 1. FC Nürnberg II, coming off the bench at the 46th minute.

On 25 October 2024, he scored his first professional goal with Bayern Munich II, as a starter during the 3–0 home win Regionalliga Bayern match against TSV Schwaben Augsburg, opening the score with his goal at the 14th minute.

Della Rovere was called up for the 5–0 win friendly match against Austrian Bundesliga club Red Bull Salzburg on 6 January 2026, substituting Felipe Chávez at the 82nd minute.

On 21 March 2026, he was called up with the Bayern Munich senior team for the first time, during a 4–0 home win Bundesliga match against Union Berlin, as an unused substitute however.

After the 2025–26 season concluded, clubs showed interest in recruiting Della Rovere, including Serie A clubs Fiorentina and Napoli, ahead of the 2026–27 season.

== International career ==
Born in Cremona, Italy, to an Italian father and a mother from Lithuania, Della Rovere holds dual Italian and Lithuanian citizenship, thus making him eligible to represent either nation. He has represented Italy as a youth international, featuring with the under-15s, under-16s, under-18s and under-19s.

== Career statistics ==
=== Club ===
As of match played 18 October 2026

Appearances and goals by club, season and competition
Club	Season	League			National cup		Other		Total	
Club	Season	Division	Apps	Goals	Apps	Goals	Apps	Goals	Apps	Goals
Cremonese	2023–24	Serie B	1	0	—		—		1	0
Cremonese	Total		1	0	—		—		1	0
Bayern Munich II	2024–25	Regionalliga Bayern	22	1	—		—		22	1
Bayern Munich II	2025–26	Regionalliga Bayern	24	4	—		—		24	4
Bayern Munich II	2026–27	Regionalliga Bayern	4	0	—		—		4	0
Bayern Munich II	Total		50	5	—		—		50	5
Bayern Munich	2025–26	Bundesliga	0	0	0	0	0	0	0	0
Bayern Munich	Total		0	0	0	0	0	0	0	0
Career total			51	5	0	0	0	0	51	5

== Style of play ==
Della Rovere plays as midfielder, mainly as a central or attacking one, and he has occasionally played as a winger and wide midfielder.
