= Wisdom Mike =

German footballer (born 2008)

Personal information
- Full name: Wisdom Okpako Mike
- Date of birth: 24 September 2008 (age 18)
- Place of birth: Munich, Germany
- Height: 1.75 m (5 ft 9 in)
- Position: Winger

Team information
- Current team: Club Brugge
- Number: 27

Youth career
- –2019: MSV Duisburg
- 2019–2022: Borussia Mönchengladbach
- 2022–2025: Bayern Munich

Senior career*
Years	Team	Apps	(Gls)
2025–2026	Bayern Munich	4	(0)
2025–2026	Bayern Munich II	2	(1)
2026–	Club NXT	4	(0)
2026–	Club Brugge	0	(0)

International career^{‡}
2023	Germany U15	2	(1)
2023–2025	Germany U16	5	(1)
2024–	Germany U17	8	(3)
2026–	Germany U19	3	(0)
- * Club domestic league appearances and goals as of 23:30, 7 November 2026 (UTC) ‡ National team caps and goals as of 3 October 2026

Wisdom Okpako Mike (English pronunciation: /ˈwɪzdəm ˈmaɪk/; born 24 September 2008) is a German professional footballer who plays as a winger for Belgian Pro League club Club Brugge and its reserve team Club NXT. He is a German youth international.

== Club career ==
=== Bayern Munich ===
As a youth player, Mike joined the youth academy of MSV Duisburg. In 2019, he joined the youth academy of Bundesliga side Borussia Mönchengladbach. At the age of thirteen, he was transferred to the youth academy of fellow Bundesliga side Bayern Munich in 2022.

On 7 February 2025, ahead of the second half of the season, while playing for both the under-17, with whom he had scored 13 goals during 11 matches played at the moment, and the under-19 sides, Mike being 16 years old, was called up with the Bayern Munich senior team for a 3–0 home win Bundesliga match against Werder Bremen, as an unused substitute however.

On 11 June 2025, Bayern Munich announced their 32-player final squad for the FIFA Club World Cup, which included Mike.

He was one of the players that were called up by Bayern Munich head coach Vincent Kompany, for the 2025 pre-season matches against French Ligue 1 club Lyon, English Premier League club Tottenham Hotspur, and Swiss Super League club Grasshopper, on 2, 7, and 12 August 2025, respectively. On 8 August, he extended his contract with the club, alongside his teammate Lennart Karl.

Mike made his professional debut with Bayern Munich II on 23 August 2025, coming off the bench and scoring a goal for a 2–2 home draw Regionalliga Bayern match against SpVgg Bayreuth.

On 26 September 2025, he made his debut with the Bayern Munich senior team during a 4–0 home win Bundesliga match against Werder Bremen, substituting Luis Díaz. A month later, on 22 October, he made his UEFA Champions League debut in a 4–0 win over Belgian Pro League club Club Brugge.

Mike was called up as a starter for the 5–0 win friendly match against Austrian Bundesliga club Red Bull Salzburg on 6 January 2026.

=== Club Brugge ===
On 27 August 2026, Mike moved to Belgian Pro League club Club Brugge on a permanent transfer, signing a three-year contract.

== International career ==
Born in Germany, Mike is of Nigerian descent and is eligible to represent Germany and Nigeria internationally.

He has represented Germany at the under-15, under-16 and under-17 levels internationally. Having participated in the 2025 UEFA European Under-17 Championship and the 2025 FIFA U-17 World Cup with the U17s.

== Style of play ==
Mike plays as a winger and is two-footed, he can also be deployed as a forward. Known for his speed and dribbling ability, he has received comparisons to France international Ousmane Dembélé.

== Career statistics ==
As of match played 8 August 2026

Appearances and goals by club, season and competition
Club	Season	League			DFB-Pokal		Europe		Other		Total	
Club	Season	Division	Apps	Goals	Apps	Goals	Apps	Goals	Apps	Goals	Apps	Goals
Bayern Munich	2024–25	Bundesliga	0	0	0	0	0	0	0	0	0	0
Bayern Munich	2025–26	Bundesliga	4	0	0	0	1 (Note: Appearance in UEFA Champions League)	0	0	0	5	0
Bayern Munich	Total		4	0	0	0	1	0	0	0	5	0
Bayern Munich II	2025–26	Regionalliga Bayern	1	1	—		—		—		1	1
Bayern Munich II	2026–27	Regionalliga Bayern	1	0	—		—		—		1	0
Career total			6	1	0	0	1	0	0	0	7	1

== Honours ==
Bayern Munich

- Bundesliga: 2024–25
- Franz Beckenbauer Supercup: 2025
