= 2024–25 SpVgg Unterhaching season =

SpVgg Unterhaching
2024–25 season
- Manager: Marc Unterberger
- Stadium: Sportpark Unterhaching
- 3. Liga: Pre-season
- Bavarian Cup: First round

The 2024–25 season is the 100th season in the history of SpVgg Unterhaching, and the club's second consecutive season in 3. Liga. In addition to the domestic league, the team is scheduled to participate in the Bavarian Cup.

== Transfers ==
=== In ===
Pos.	Player	Transferred from	Fee	Date	Source
DF	(Germany) Ben Schlicke	(Germany) SpVgg Greuther Fürth	Free	1 July 2024	
FW	(Germany) Thomas Winklbauer	(Germany) SV Wacker Burghausen	Free	1 July 2024	
DF	(Germany) Maximilian Hennig	(Germany) Bayern Munich	Loan	1 July 2024	
MF	(Germany) Robin Littig	(Germany) SpVgg Greuther Fürth		1 July 2024	
FW	(Germany) Julian Kügel	(Germany) FC Ingolstadt 04	Undisclosed	1 July 2024	
MF	(Germany) Fynn Seidel	(Germany) SV Meppen	Undisclosed	1 July 2024	
FW	(Germany) Luc Ihorst	(Germany) Eintracht Braunschweig	Free	1 July 2024	
FW	(Germany) Lenn Jastremski	(Germany) Bayern Munich	Free	1 July 2024	
DF	(Germany) Marcel Martens	(Germany) TSV 1860 Rosenheim	Undisclosed	1 July 2024	
FW	(Germany) Gibson Nana Adu	(Germany) Bayern Munich	Loan	2 July 2024	

=== Out ===
Pos.	Player	Transferred to	Fee	Date	Source
MF	(Germany) Maximilian Welzmüller		End of contract	1 July 2024	
FW	(Germany) Mathias Fetsch	(Germany) SC Freiburg II		1 July 2024	
FW	(Germany) Patrick Hobsch	(Germany) TSV 1860 Munich		1 July 2024	
FW	(Switzerland) Aaron Keller	(Germany) SSV Ulm	Loan	1 July 2024	

== Friendlies ==
Unterhaching's pre-season began on 20 June which will include a camp in Schlanders, South Tyrol, Italy.

22 June 2024 Friendly	SpVgg Unterhaching (Germany)	17–2	(Germany) SC Reisbach	Reichersbeuern
16:00

23 June 2024 Friendly	Neufraunhofen (Germany)	1–6	(Germany) SpVgg Unterhaching	Neufraunhofen
16:00

29 June 2024 Friendly	FC Deisenhofen (Germany)	2–2	(Germany) SpVgg Unterhaching	Deisenhofen
12:00	[[]] 7' (pen.); [[]] 39'		[[]] 20'; [[]] 44'	Stadium: Sportanlage Deisenhofen - Platz 1
Note: 2 X 30 minutes

29 June 2024 Friendly	Red Bull Salzburg (Austria)	3–0	(Germany) SpVgg Unterhaching	Anif, Austria
17:00	Daghim 43'; Kjærgaard 45+1'; Blank 69'		Winklbauer (yellow card) 84'	Stadium: Sportzentrum Anif

30 June 2024 Friendly	SV Schalding-Heining (Germany)	2–1	(Germany) SpVgg Unterhaching	Passau
16:45	Schnabel 81'; Schmid 87'		89'	Stadium: Dreiflüssestadion

12 July 2024 Friendly	Bayern Munich II (Germany)	3–2	(Germany) SpVgg Unterhaching	Heimstetten
18:30	Wagner 9'; Ličina 41'; Manuba 81'		Jastremski 28', 31'	Stadium: ATS Sportpark Heimstetten

13 July 2024 Friendly	SV Wacker Burghausen (Germany)	1–1	(Germany) SpVgg Unterhaching	Reichersbeuern
12:00	Bibaku 42'		Littig 76'

17 July 2024 Friendly	SpVgg Unterhaching (Germany)	1–3	(Germany) SSV Ulm
18:00

20 July 2024 Friendly	SV Raisting (Germany)	1–4	(Germany) SpVgg Unterhaching
16:00

5 January 2025 Friendly	Greuther Fürth (Germany)	0–0	(Germany) SpVgg Unterhaching
13:00

== Competitions ==
=== Overall record ===
Competition	First match	Last match	Starting round	Record							
Competition	First match	Last match	Starting round	Pld	W	D	L	GF	GA	GD	Win %
3. Liga	2–4 August 2024	17 May 2025	Matchday 1	0	0	0	0	0	0	+0	—
Bavarian Cup				0	0	0	0	0	0	+0	—
Total				0	0	0	0	0	0	+0	—

Source: Competitions

=== 3. Liga ===
==== League table ====
Pos	Team	Pld	W	D	L	GF	GA	GD	Pts	Promotion, qualification or relegation
16	Waldhof Mannheim	38	11	13	14	43	45	−2	46	
17	Borussia Dortmund II (Note: Reserve teams are ineligible for promotion or DFB-Pokal qualification.) (R)	38	11	10	17	53	60	−7	43	Relegation to Regionalliga
18	Hannover 96 II (R)	38	9	10	19	51	70	−19	37	Relegation to Regionalliga
19	SV Sandhausen (R)	38	9	8	21	49	69	−20	35	Relegation to Regionalliga
20	SpVgg Unterhaching (R)	38	4	13	21	40	72	−32	25	Relegation to Regionalliga

Source: DFB
Rules for classification: 1) Points; 2) Goal difference; 3) Goals scored; 4) Head-to-head results; 5) Head-to-head away goals scored; 6) Away goals scored; 7) Play-off.
(R) Relegated

==== Matches ====
The match schedule was released on 9 July 2024.

3 August 2024 1	Borussia Dortmund II	3–0	SpVgg Unterhaching
14:00
