= Erblin Osmani =

Kosovan footballer (born 2009)

Personal information
- Date of birth: 19 May 2009 (age 17)
- Place of birth: Munich, Germany
- Height: 1.85 m (6 ft 1 in)
- Position: Central midfielder

Team information
- Current team: Bayern Munich

Youth career
- –2017: TSV Milbertshofen
- 2017–: Bayern Munich

Senior career*
| Years | Team | Apps | (Gls) |
| 2026– | Bayern Munich | 1 | (0) |
| 2026– | Bayern Munich II | 4 | (0) |

International career^{‡}
| 2024–2025 | Germany U16 | 7 | (1) |
| 2026 | Germany U17 | 2 | (0) |
| 2026– | Kosovo | 1 | (0) |
- * Club domestic league appearances and goals as of 23:45, 31 October 2026 (UTC) ‡ National team caps and goals as of 24 September 2026

Erblin Osmani (German pronunciation: [ɛʁˈbliːn ɔsˈmaːni]; born 19 May 2009) is a professional footballer who plays as a central midfielder for Bundesliga club Bayern Munich. Born in Germany, he represented that nation at youth international level before switching to represent Kosovo at senior international level.

== Club career ==
=== Bayern Munich ===
Osmani joined the youth academy of TSV Milbertshofen as a youth player. Following his stint there, he joined the youth academy of Bundesliga side Bayern Munich ahead of the 2017–18 season.

On 21 March 2026, he received his first call-up with the Bayern Munich senior team and made his professional debut as well, substituting Leon Goretzka at the 87th minute of the 4–0 home win Bundesliga match against Union Berlin.

On 22 July 2026, Osmani signed a long-term contract extension with Bayern Munich.

== International career ==
Born and raised in Munich, Germany to Kosovo Albanian parents from Gjilan, Osmani is eligible to represent Kosovo, Albania or Germany at international level, with the latter of which he has represented at under-16 and under-17 levels. On 23 March 2026, two days after making his first-team debut for Bayern Munich, Bajram Shala, the team manager of the Kosovo national team confirmed that sporting director Muharrem Sahiti had been in direct contact with Osmani's family regarding the possibility of him representing Kosovo at international level.

On 1 June 2026, Osmani visited the headquarters of the Football Federation of Kosovo, where he was received by FFK president Agim Ademi, who presented him with a Kosovo national team number 10 shirt. During his visit, Osmani also attended a training session ahead of Kosovo's friendly match against Andorra at the Fadil Vokrri Stadium. On 4 September 2026, Kosovo's ambassador to Germany, Faruk Ajeti announced that he had been issued a Kosovo passport and had decided to represent Kosovo at international level.

On 18 September 2026, Osmani was called up with the Kosovo national team by head coach Franco Foda for the first four 2026–27 UEFA Nations League matches, against Republic of Ireland, the Austria (twice) and Israel.

On 24 September 2026, he played his first game with Kosovo national team against Republic of Ireland, to become at 17 years 4 months and 5 days the youngest ever player for Kosovo.

== Career statistics ==
As of match played 31 October 2026

Appearances and goals by club, season and competition
| Club | Season | League | | | Cup | | Europe | | Other | | Total | |
| Club | Season | Division | Apps | Goals | Apps | Goals | Apps | Goals | Apps | Goals | Apps | Goals |
|---|---|---|---|---|---|---|---|---|---|---|---|---|
| Bayern Munich | 2025–26 | Bundesliga | 1 | 0 | 0 | 0 | 0 | 0 | 0 | 0 | 1 | 0 |
| Bayern Munich | Total | | 1 | 0 | 0 | 0 | 0 | 0 | 0 | 0 | 1 | 0 |
| Bayern Munich II | 2026–27 | Regionalliga Bayern | 4 | 0 | — | | — | | — | | 4 | 0 |
| Bayern Munich II | Total | | 4 | 0 | — | | — | | 0 | 0 | 4 | 0 |
| Career Total | | | 5 | 0 | 0 | 0 | 0 | 0 | 0 | 0 | 5 | 0 |

=== International ===
As of match played 24 September 2026

| National team | Year | Apps | Goals |
|---|---|---|---|
| Kosovo | 2026 | 1 | 0 |
| Total | | 1 | 0 |
