= Gibson Adu =

German footballer (born 2008)

Personal information
- Full name: Gibson Nana Adu
- Date of birth: 14 February 2008 (age 18)
- Place of birth: Mainz, Germany
- Height: 1.83 m (6 ft 0 in)
- Positions: Striker; winger

Team information
- Current team: Greifswalder FC
- Number: 10

Youth career
- 2016–2017: SC Lerchenberg
- 2017–2022: Mainz 05
- 2022–2023: SpVgg Unterhaching
- 2026: → SpVgg Unterhaching (loan)

Senior career*
Years	Team	Apps	(Gls)
2024	SpVgg Unterhaching	10	(1)
2024–2026	Bayern Munich II	1	(0)
2024–2025	→ SpVgg Unterhaching (loan)	8	(0)
2024–2025	→ SpVgg Unterhaching II (loan)	8	(0)
2025	→ Rheindorf Altach (loan)	0	(0)
2026	→ SpVgg Unterhaching (loan)	0	(0)
2026	→ SpVgg Unterhaching II (loan)	8	(5)
2026–	Greifswalder FC	3	(0)
2026–	Greifswalder FC II	2	(0)
- * Club domestic league appearances and goals as of 24 October 2026

Gibson Nana Adu (born 14 February 2008) is a German professional footballer who plays as a striker and winger for Regionalliga Nordost club Greifswalder FC.

== Club career ==
=== Early career ===
Adu started playing football at SC Lerchenberg. He played well at a youth tournament in 2016 and moved to the youth training center of Mainz 05 in the beginning of 2017. He then moved to the youth department of SpVgg Unterhaching in the summer of 2022. On 4 March 2023, he became the youngest player ever in the Under 19 Bundesliga South/Southwest at the age of 15 years and 18 days.

=== SpVgg Unterhaching ===
On 17 February 2024, he was called up to the first-team matchday squad for the first time by coach Marc Unterberger. In the 2-1 win against Arminia Bielefeld, Adu was substituted for Aaron Keller in stoppage time, making him the youngest player ever to play in the 3. Liga at the age of just 16 years and three days, replacing the previous record holder Abdoulaye Kamara. At the age of 16 years and 61 days, he scored his first goal in his eighth appearance in the 3. Liga in a 4-1 win against VfB Lübeck. This made him the youngest ever goalscorer in the 3. Liga.

=== Bayern Munich ===
In June 2024, Adu along with teammate Maurice Krattenmacher were both transferred to Bundesliga club Bayern Munich for the 2024–25 season, Adu however was loaned back with SpVgg Unterhaching until the end of the season.

On 5 September 2025, he joined Austrian Bundesliga club Rheindorf Altach on a one-year loan for the 2025–26 season. On 20 September 2025, UEFA declared Adu's loan to be beyond the scope of regulations and he was returned to Bayern Munich II.

Adu made his debut with Bayern Munich II on 3 October 2025, during a 1–1 away draw Regionalliga Bayern match against SpVgg Ansbach, substituting Felipe Chávez at the second half.

==== Loan to SpVgg Unterhaching ====
On 10 November 2025, Bayern Munich announced that Adu would once again be sent to SpVgg Unterhaching, in the Regionalliga Bayern, on a six-month loan, until the end of the season.

=== Greifswalder FC ===
On 1 September 2026, he joined Regionalliga Nordost club Greifswalder FC, on a permanent transfer signing a two-year contract with and option for a third year, ahead of the 2026–27 season.

== Personal life ==
Born in Mainz, Germany, Adu is of Ghanaian descent.

== Career statistics ==
As of match played 5 May 2026

Appearances and goals by club, season and competition
Club	Season	League			Cup		Other (Note: Includes Bavarian Cup)		Total	
Club	Season	Division	Apps	Goals	Apps	Goals	Apps	Goals	Apps	Goals
SpVgg Unterhaching	2023–24	3. Liga	10	1	—		—		10	1
SpVgg Unterhaching (loan)	2024–25	3. Liga	8	0	—		1	0	9	0
SpVgg Unterhaching (loan)	Total		18	1	1	0	—		19	1
SpVgg Unterhaching II (loan)	2024–25	Bayernliga Süd	8	0	—		—		8	0
Bayern Munich II	2025–26	Regionalliga Bayern	1	0	—		—		1	0
Rheindorf Altach (loan)	2025–26	Austrian Bundesliga	0	0	—		—		0	0
SpVgg Unterhaching (loan)	2025–26	Regionalliga Bayern	0	0	—		—		0	0
SpVgg Unterhaching II (loan)	2025–26	Landesliga Bayern-Südost	8	5	—		—		8	5
Career Total			35	6	0	0	1	0	36	6
