= 2020 FIFA Club World Cup final =

Final of the 2020 edition of Club World Cup

- The Education City Stadium in Al Rayyan hosted the final.
- Event: 2020 FIFA Club World Cup
Bayern Munich	Tigres UANL
(Germany)	(Mexico)
1	0
- Date: 11 February 2021
- Venue: Education City Stadium, Al Rayyan
- Man of the Match: Joshua Kimmich (Bayern Munich)
- Referee: Esteban Ostojich (Uruguay)
- Attendance: 7,411
- Weather: Clear night 19 °C (66 °F); 78% humidity

The 2020 FIFA Club World Cup final was the final match of the 2020 FIFA Club World Cup, an international club football tournament hosted by Qatar. It was the 17th final of the FIFA Club World Cup, a FIFA-organised tournament between the club champions from each of the six continental confederations, as well as the host nation's league champions.

The final was contested by German club Bayern Munich, representing UEFA as the reigning champions of the UEFA Champions League, and Mexican club Tigres UANL, representing CONCACAF as the reigning champions of the CONCACAF Champions League. It was the first time a team from the CONCACAF region played in the final.

The match was played at the Education City Stadium in Al Rayyan on 11 February 2021. The final was originally scheduled to be played in December 2020, but was moved to February due to the impact of the COVID-19 pandemic on the scheduling of the various continental club competitions.

Bayern Munich won the match 1–0 for their second FIFA Club World Cup title and fourth title at the global level. With the win, Bayern became the second European team to complete a sextuple (six trophies in a year) after Barcelona in 2009; they had won a continental treble in the previous season, along with their domestic and continental super cups in the 2020–21 campaign.

== Teams ==
Team	Confederation	Qualification for tournament	Previous club world championship finals
(Germany) Bayern Munich	UEFA	Winners of the 2019–20 UEFA Champions League	IC: 2 (1976, 2001); FCWC: 1 (2013)
(Mexico) Tigres UANL	CONCACAF	Winners of the 2020 CONCACAF Champions League	None

== Venue ==
The Education City Stadium in Al Rayyan, Qatar was announced as the final venue on 23 December 2020. The venue finished construction and opened in 2020, and will host matches at the 2022 FIFA World Cup. Originally, the stadium was to host the second semi-final, third place play-off and final of the 2019 FIFA Club World Cup, but the matches were moved to the Khalifa International Stadium after the opening of the Education City Stadium was postponed.

== Background ==
Bayern Munich reached their second Club World Cup Final in two tournament appearances, having done so in 2013, which they won against Raja Casablanca. Overall, it was their fourth club world championship final, having won their Intercontinental Cup in 1976 and 2001. Bayern Munich were seeking their sixth title in a year, having won the Bundesliga, DFB-Pokal and UEFA Champions League in the 2019–20 season, followed by the UEFA Super Cup and DFL-Supercup so far in the 2020–21 campaign. Therefore, a victory would see become the second team to win a sextuple, consisting of a continental treble (domestic league, domestic cup and continental competition), followed by the subsequent domestic and continental super cups and FIFA Club World Cup in the following season. This feat had only previously been achieved by Barcelona in 2009 (end of the 2008–09 season and start of the 2009–10 season).

Tigres UANL became the first side from CONCACAF to reach the final of the Club World Cup. They were making their debut appearance in the competition, having qualified by winning their first CONCACAF Champions League title in 2020.

== Route to the final ==
(Germany) Bayern Munich		Team	(Mexico) Tigres UANL	
Opponent	Result	2020 FIFA Club World Cup	Opponent	Result
Bye		Second round	(South Korea) Ulsan Hyundai	2–1
(Egypt) Al Ahly	2–0	Semi-finals	(Brazil) Palmeiras	1–0

== Match ==
=== Summary ===
In the 59th minute, Benjamin Pavard got the only goal of the game when he shot into an empty net from six yards out after the ball came to him when Robert Lewandowski challenged for a ball in the air with Tigres UANL goalkeeper Nahuel Guzmán. The goal was reviewed by VAR for an offside before eventually being awarded.

=== Details ===
11 February 2021
21:00 AST

Bayern Munich (Germany)	1–0	(Mexico) Tigres UANL
Pavard 59'	Report

Education City Stadium, Al Rayyan
Attendance: 7,411
Referee: Esteban Ostojich (Uruguay)

Bayern Munich	Tigres UANL

GK	1	(Germany) Manuel Neuer (c)
RB	5	(France) Benjamin Pavard
CB	4	(Germany) Niklas Süle
CB	21	(France) Lucas Hernandez
LB	19	(Canada) Alphonso Davies
CM	6	(Germany) Joshua Kimmich
CM	27	(Austria) David Alaba
RW	10	(Germany) Leroy Sané	(substituted off) 73'
AM	29	(France) Kingsley Coman	(substituted off) 73'
LW	7	(Germany) Serge Gnabry	(substituted off) 64'
CF	9	(Poland) Robert Lewandowski	(substituted off) 73'
Substitutes:
GK	34	(Germany) Lukas Schneller
GK	39	(Germany) Ron-Thorben Hoffmann
DF	20	(France) Bouna Sarr
MF	22	(Spain) Marc Roca
MF	24	(France) Corentin Tolisso	(substituted on) 64'
MF	28	(Portugal) Tiago Dantas
MF	42	(England) Jamal Musiala	(substituted on) 73'
FW	11	(Brazil) Douglas Costa	(substituted on) 73'
FW	13	(Cameroon) Eric Maxim Choupo-Moting	(substituted on) 73'
Manager:
(Germany) Hansi Flick

GK	1	(Argentina) Nahuel Guzmán
RB	28	(Mexico) Luis Rodríguez	(yellow card) 69'	(substituted off) 80'
CB	13	(Mexico) Diego Reyes
CB	3	(Mexico) Carlos Salcedo
LB	29	(Mexico) Jesús Dueñas	(yellow card) 42'
RM	20	(Mexico) Javier Aquino
CM	5	(Brazil) Rafael Carioca	(yellow card) 90'
CM	19	(Argentina) Guido Pizarro (c)
LM	23	(Colombia) Luis Quiñones
CF	32	(Paraguay) Carlos González
CF	10	(France) André-Pierre Gignac
Substitutes:
GK	35	(Mexico) Juan Pablo Chávez
GK	50	(Mexico) Arturo Delgado
DF	4	(Mexico) Hugo Ayala
DF	14	(Mexico) Juan Sánchez
DF	18	(Mexico) Aldo Cruz
DF	21	(Colombia) Francisco Meza
DF	43	(Mexico) Érick Ávalos
MF	8	(Ecuador) Jordan Sierra
MF	17	(Uruguay) Leonardo Fernández
MF	22	(Mexico) Raymundo Fulgencio
FW	33	(Colombia) Julián Quiñones		(substituted on) 80'
FW	52	(Mexico) Patrick Ogama
Manager:
(Brazil) Ricardo Ferretti

Man of the Match:
Joshua Kimmich (Bayern Munich)

Assistant referees:
Nicolás Taran (Uruguay)
Richard Trinidad (Uruguay)
Fourth official:
Edina Alves Batista (Brazil)
Reserve assistant referee:
Neuza Back (Brazil)
Video assistant referee:
Julio Bascuñán (Chile) (Note: Nicolás Gallo (Colombia) was originally appointed as the video assistant referee for the final, with Julio Bascuñán (Chile) serving as the assistant video assistant referee. However, Gallo was later removed from the match, with Bascuñán changed to the video assistant referee, and Khamis Al-Marri (Qatar) appointed as the assistant video assistant referee.)
Assistant video assistant referee:
Khamis Al-Marri (Qatar)

Match rules

- 90 minutes
- 30 minutes of extra time if necessary
- Penalty shoot-out if scores still level
- Maximum of twelve named substitutes
- Maximum of five normal substitutions, with a sixth allowed in extra time (Note: Each team was given only three opportunities to make substitutions, with a fourth opportunity in extra time, excluding substitutions made at half-time, before the start of extra time and at half-time in extra time.)
- Maximum of one concussion substitute

=== Statistics ===
First half
Statistic	Bayern Munich	Tigres UANL
Goals scored	0	0
Total shots	8	3
Shots on target	4	1
Saves	1	4
Ball possession	58%	42%
Corner kicks	3	2
Fouls committed	6	6
Offsides	2	0
Yellow cards	0	1
Red cards	0	0

Second half
Statistic	Bayern Munich	Tigres UANL
Goals scored	1	0
Total shots	11	0
Shots on target	5	0
Saves	0	4
Ball possession	52%	48%
Corner kicks	1	0
Fouls committed	6	5
Offsides	0	3
Yellow cards	0	2
Red cards	0	0

Overall
Statistic	Bayern Munich	Tigres UANL
Goals scored	1	0
Total shots	19	3
Shots on target	9	1
Saves	1	8
Ball possession	55%	45%
Corner kicks	4	2
Fouls committed	12	11
Offsides	2	3
Yellow cards	0	3
Red cards	0	0
