= Tom Bischof =

German footballer (born 2005)

Personal information
- Full name: Tom Bischof
- Date of birth: 28 June 2005 (age 21)
- Place of birth: Aschaffenburg, Germany
- Height: 1.80 m (5 ft 11 in)
- Positions: Midfielder; full-back

Team information
- Current team: Bayern Munich
- Number: 8

Youth career
- 2008–2015: TSV Amorbach
- 2015–2022: TSG Hoffenheim II

Senior career*
Years	Team	Apps	(Gls)
2023–2024	TSG Hoffenheim II	19	(5)
2022–2025	TSG Hoffenheim	56	(5)
2025–	Bayern Munich	35	(3)

International career^{‡}
2020	Germany U16	2	(1)
2021–2022	Germany U17	16	(7)
2022–2023	Germany U18	7	(2)
2023–2024	Germany U19	10	(5)
2024	Germany U20	1	(1)
2025–	Germany U21	7	(3)
2025–	Germany	5	(1)
- * Club domestic league appearances and goals as of 21:24, 20 November 2026 (UTC) ‡ National team caps and goals as of 21:50, 16 November 2026 (UTC)

Tom Bischof (German pronunciation: [tɔm ˈbɪʃɔf]; born 28 June 2005) is a German professional footballer who plays as a midfielder or full-back for Bundesliga club Bayern Munich and the Germany national team.

== Club career ==
=== TSG Hoffenheim ===
Bischof joined TSG Hoffenheim academy from TSV Amorbach in 2015, and made his professional debut for the senior team in the Bundesliga on 19 March 2022 in the 3–0 away loss against Hertha BSC at 16 years and 264 days of age, becoming Hoffenheim's youngest ever player. On 23 November 2024, he netted his first professional goal in a 4–3 victory over RB Leipzig in the Bundesliga, scoring from a free-kick.

On 21 January 2025, Bischof agreed to join Bayern Munich after the 2024–25 season, letting his contract at TSG Hoffenheim expire, signing a four-year contract through June 2029. On 30 January, Bischof scored his first ever goal in European competitions, in Hoffenheim's 4–3 victory over Anderlecht in the 2024–25 UEFA Europa League league phase, also assisting. He ended his final Bundesliga season at Hoffenheim with 5 goals and 2 assists. Eventually, Bayern paid a low six-digit fee to Hoffenheim to already secure his services at the Club World Cup.

=== Bayern Munich ===
On 24 June 2025, Bischof made his debut for Bayern Munich, starting against Benfica during the 2025 FIFA Club World Cup. With Bayern, he reached the quarter-final, getting knocked out by PSG. On 13 September, he made his Bayern-debut in the Bundesliga as a substitute in a 5–0 win over HSV. Four days later, Bischof made his debut in the Champions League, being subbed on in a 3–1 win over Chelsea. On 26 September, he started for the first time and play full 90 minutes in a 4–0 victory to Werder Bremen, registering his first goal contribution by assisting Konrad Laimer. On 4 November, he was subbed on at half time after a red card by Luis Díaz, playing the full second half in a 2–1 win over PSG in the UCL. On 21 January 2026, he was in the starting line-up in the Champions League for the first time, playing full 90 minutes in a 2–0 win over Union SG.

On 4 April 2026, he scored his first two competitive goals for Bayern in an away victory over Freiburg, scoring a goal in the 81st minute and in extra time to tie the match 2–2. Bayern went on and win 3–2 after another goal in extra time. Three days later, he featured in the Champions League quarter-final against Real Madrid in a 2–1 away victory, getting subbed on for Luis Díaz in extra-time. However, he missed the second leg a week later after tearing his muscle fibre prior to the game, which Bayern won 4–3. On 16 May, the final matchday, he scored a goal in a 5–1 win over Köln. Mostly being used as a left-back, he ended his season with three goals and assists, winning the Bundesliga, DFB-Pokal and Franz-Beckenbauer-Supercup.

== International career ==
Bischof has represented Germany at various youth levels, ranging from under-16 to under-20.

In June 2025, he was called up to the German senior team for the 2025 UEFA Nations League Finals by Julian Nagelsmann, making his debut against France. Later that month he rejected a call-up into the Germany squad for the 2025 UEFA European Under-21 Championship, in order to travel to the Club World Cup with Bayern.

In September 2025, he was called up to the under-21 team for the first time for the 2027 UEFA European Under-21 Championship qualifiers. On 14 November, he'd captain his side and score his first goals in a 6–0 away victory over Malta, scoring from long range thrice.

On 17 September 2026, he was called up by both Germany coach Jürgen Klopp as well as under-21 coach Antonio di Salvo for the upcoming 2026–27 UEFA Nations League match-ups as well as the Euro under-21 qualifiers, being available for the first two qualifying matches against Latvia and Malta for the under-21 side, and the Nations League matchday three and four matches against Serbia and Greece for the senior team.

On 1 October, he started for the first time for Germany in a 2–0 win over Serbia in the Allianz Arena, scoring his first goal after an assist from Florian Wirtz.

== Style of play ==
Bischof is a left-footed box-to-box midfielder who primarily plays as a central midfielder, but can also be deployed as a defensive, attacking or wide midfielder. Thanks to his variability, he's also frequently used as a full-back, mostly on the left flank, by Vincent Kompany. Due to his playing style, variability and mentality, he has publicly been hailed as the successor of Joshua Kimmich or Leon Goretzka at Bayern Munich.

== Personal life ==
Born in Aschaffenburg, Bavaria, Bischof is of Banat Swabian origin through his paternal grandmother, an ethnic German people spread across south-east Europe. His grandmother Elisabeth Bischof (née Schmelzer), was born in Cenad, Romania and fled with her family from the Soviet occupation in 1944. She would settle in Amorbach, Bavaria and marry Manfred Bischof, Tom's grandfather and give birth to his father Thomas Bischof.

Bischof is in a relationship with Josefine Scholl, who is the daughter of former Bayern Munich and Germany player Mehmet Scholl.

== Career statistics ==
=== Club ===
As of match played 20 November 2026

Appearances and goals by club, season and competition
Club	Season	League			DFB-Pokal		Europe		Other		Total	
Club	Season	Division	Apps	Goals	Apps	Goals	Apps	Goals	Apps	Goals	Apps	Goals
TSG Hoffenheim	2021–22	Bundesliga	1	0	0	0	—		—		1	0
TSG Hoffenheim	2022–23	Bundesliga	11	0	3	0	—		—		14	0
TSG Hoffenheim	2023–24	Bundesliga	13	0	1	0	—		—		14	0
TSG Hoffenheim	2024–25	Bundesliga	31	5	2	0	8 (Note: Appearances in UEFA Europa League)	1	—		41	6
TSG Hoffenheim	Total		56	5	6	0	8	1	—		70	6
TSG Hoffenheim II	2022–23	Regionalliga Südwest	1	1	—		—		—		1	1
TSG Hoffenheim II	2023–24	Regionalliga Südwest	18	4	—		—		—		18	4
TSG Hoffenheim II	Total		19	5	—		—		—		19	5
Bayern Munich	2024–25	Bundesliga	—		—		—		1 (Note: Appearance in FIFA Club World Cup)	0	1	0
Bayern Munich	2025–26	Bundesliga	26	3	1	0	10 (Note: Appearances in UEFA Champions League)	0	1 (Note: Appearance in Franz Beckenbauer Supercup)	0	38	3
Bayern Munich	2026–27	Bundesliga	9	0	2	1	4	0	1	0	16	1
Bayern Munich	Total		35	3	3	1	14	0	3	0	55	4
Career total			109	13	9	1	22	1	3	0	143	15

=== International ===
As of match played 16 November 2026

Appearances and goals by national team and year
National team	Year	Apps	Goals
Germany	2025	1	0
Germany	2026	4	1
Total		5	1

As of match played 1 October 2026
Scores and results list Germany's tally first, score column indicates score after each Bischof goal.

List of international goals scored by Tom Bischof
No.	Date	Venue	Cap	Opponent	Score	Result	Competition
1	1 October 2026	Allianz Arena, Munich, Germany	2	Serbia	1–0	2–0	2026–27 UEFA Nations League A

== Honours ==
Bayern Munich

- Bundesliga: 2025–26
- DFB-Pokal: 2025–26
- Franz Beckenbauer Supercup: 2025, 2026

Individual

- Fritz Walter Medal U19 Gold: 2024
