= Lennart Karl =

German footballer (born 2008)

Personal information
- Full name: Lennart Karl
- Date of birth: 22 February 2008 (age 18)
- Place of birth: Frammersbach, Germany
- Height: 1.68 m (5 ft 6 in)
- Positions: Attacking midfielder; winger

Team information
- Current team: Bayern Munich
- Number: 42

Youth career
- 2015–2017: Viktoria Aschaffenburg
- 2017–2021: Eintracht Frankfurt
- 2022: Viktoria Aschaffenburg
- 2022–2025: Bayern Munich

Senior career*
Years	Team	Apps	(Gls)
2025	Bayern Munich II	1	(0)
2025–	Bayern Munich	35	(7)

International career^{‡}
2023	Germany U15	2	(1)
2023–2024	Germany U16	9	(5)
2024–2025	Germany U17	13	(7)
2025	Germany U21	2	(3)
2026–	Germany	5	(0)
- * Club domestic league appearances and goals as of 21:25, 20 November 2026 (UTC) ‡ National team caps and goals as of 21:50, 16 November 2026 (UTC)

Lennart Karl (German pronunciation: [ˈlɛnart kaʁl]; born 22 February 2008) is a German professional footballer who plays as an attacking midfielder or winger for Bundesliga club Bayern Munich and the Germany national team.

== Club career ==
=== 2015–2022: Early years ===
Karl joined the academy of Viktoria Aschaffenburg in 2015, and he moved to the academy of Eintracht Frankfurt in 2017. In June 2018, at 10 years of age, Karl took part at a scouting tournament in Aschaffenburg, progressing to the next round and being invited to audition in the Bernabéu by Real Madrid. However, his family prevented a move as they felt that it wasn't really about their son at all – but rather about negotiating contracts for large football agencies.

In 2022, Frankfurt wanted to extend Karl's academy contract, but since Bayern Munich showed strong interest, Karl expressed his willingness to join Bayern's academy in the summer, which led to his exemption at Frankfurt at the beginning of the year. Bridging his time until summer, he immediately rejoined Viktoria Aschaffenburg for the remainder of the season, before he joined Bayern Munich's academy.

=== 2022–2025: Bayern academy ===
During the 2024–25 season he started with the U17 Nachwuchsliga Group F for Bayern Munich with 17 goals and 8 assists in just 9 appearances. In October 2024 top-flight clubs, like Spanish La Liga club Real Madrid and Dutch Eredivisie club Ajax, showed interest in recruiting him. At only 16 years of age, Karl already represented both the under-17 and under-19 squads during the 2024–25 season, featuring at the UEFA Youth League.

=== 2025: First team debut ===
On 4 April 2025, he received his first call-up to the senior team of Bayern Munich, for a 3–1 away victory Bundesliga match against FC Augsburg, as an unused substitute and would also feature in Bayern Munich's Champions League quarter-final squads against Inter Milan. Two months later, on 15 June, Karl made his professional debut during a 10–0 victory over Auckland City in the FIFA Club World Cup, playing the full second half. With Bayern, he would reach the quarter-final, being knocked out by PSG.

=== 2025–26: Breakthrough season ===
Karl was one of the players that were called up by Bayern Munich head coach Vincent Kompany, for the 2025 pre-season matches against Ligue 1 club Lyon, Premier League club Tottenham Hotspur, and Swiss Super League club Grasshopper. Against the latter two he'd score his first two senior goals. On 8 August, Karl extended his contract with the club and chose to wear the shirt number 42, which was previously worn by Jamal Musiala, after having worn 46 in the previous months. After having won the Franz-Beckenbauer-Supercup on 16 August, he'd score his first professional goal later that year, on 22 October, in a 4–0 victory over Belgian Pro League club Club Brugge in the Champions League, becoming the club's youngest-ever scorer in the competition at 17 years and 242 days of age, surpassing the previous record held by Jamal Musiala. Three days later, he netted his first Bundesliga goal in a 3–0 away win over Borussia Mönchengladbach. On 22 November, he recorded a goal and an assist in a 6–2 victory over SC Freiburg, becoming the youngest Bayern Munich player to achieve this feat in a single Bundesliga match. Four days later, he'd become the first player in the 2025–26 Champions League season to score a goal against Arsenal. On 9 December, he netted a goal in a 3–1 victory over Portuguese Primeira Liga club Sporting CP, becoming the youngest player ever to score in three consecutive Champions League matches, breaking the previous record set by Kylian Mbappé. On 18 March 2026, Karl scored his fourth Champions League goal in the round of 16 second leg, a 4–1 home victory over Atalanta. On 4 April 2026, Karl scored a late extra-time winner in the 98th minute against SC Freiburg and assisted a previous goal, to help Bayern go 9 points clear of Dortmund in the Bundesliga title race, scoring his 5th league goal of the season. On 10 April, Karl suffered a torn muscle fibre, being sidelined for at least 3 weeks, missing Bayern's 4–3 win over Real Madrid in the quarter-final of the Champions League. He returned on 6 May in a 1–1 draw to PSG in the Champions League semi-final. On the final matchday he'd assist a goal for teammate Tom Bischof in a 5–1 victory over Cologne, as Bayern became league champions. On 23 May, he'd feature in the final of the DFB-Pokal in a 3–0 win over Stuttgart in Olympiastadion, Berlin. He would end his first professional season at Bayern with nine goals and eight assists across all competitions, having won a domestic treble and earning a spot in Germany's 2026 FIFA World Cup squad.

== International career ==
Karl has represented the Germany national U15, U16 and U17, for whom he featured in the 2025 Under-17 Euros, as well as the U21 team. For the latter, he gave his debut at the under-21 Euro qualifiers in November 2025, scoring a brace on his debut against Malta, thus becoming the second youngest goalscorer in German under-21 history behind Youssoufa Moukoko. Since it is not confirmed whether Moukoko's age is real or not, the possibility for Karl to be the youngest goalscorer yet remains.

On 19 March 2026, Karl received his first senior Germany national team call-up by head coach Julian Nagelsmann, for the pre-World Cup friendlies against Switzerland and Ghana. He would make his debut against the former eight days later in a 4–3 away victory. On 21 May, he was called up to Germany's final squad for the 2026 FIFA World Cup. He registered his first goal contribution on 31 May in a 4–0 victory over Finland, by assisting Deniz Undav. However, a muscle bundle tear in his left thigh sustained during training ruled Karl out of the World Cup, with Assan Ouédraogo called up as his replacement. Four months later, new national coach Jürgen Klopp would call him up for the 2026–27 UEFA Nations League match-ups against the Netherlands and Greece.

== Personal life ==
Born in Frammersbach, Bavaria, Karl is the son of Steffen Aloe and Caroline Karl. His father is a football coach. His younger brother Vincent also plays football for Eintracht Frankfurt's youth academy. He is in a relationship with German model and TikTok influencer Zoe Käpelle.

On 4 January 2026, at a Bayern Munich fan event, Karl, after being asked his dream club by a young Bayern supporter, stated that he dreams of playing for Spanish La Liga club Real Madrid, causing a large amount of backlash from Bayern fans. Karl was quick to apologize to club officials for his words. Shortly after, in an interview, Bayern manager Vincent Kompany described the incident as ‘an error’, saying that he will only have a problem with Karl if he ‘doesn’t give me 100%.’ Since the incident, Bayern fans have forgiven Karl for his words.

== Style of play ==
Karl is a left-footed attacking midfielder, acting as a number 10, sitting behind the striker and dictating play in the final third. With his intelligence on the ball and considerable goal contributions he has drawn comparisons with Thomas Müller, Mesut Özil and Bastian Schweinsteiger. He's also used as a winger, predominantly on the right side, often switching positions with fellow attacking midfielders mid-play. His cutting inside from the right wing, left-footed long-range goal scoring ability as well as dribbling has also, especially due to his short and slight physique, led to further comparisons with club legends Arjen Robben and Franck Ribéry, as well as comparisons to Lionel Messi.

== Career statistics ==
As of match played 20 November 2026

Appearances and goals by club, season and competition
Club	Season	League			DFB-Pokal		Europe		Other		Total	
Club	Season	Division	Apps	Goals	Apps	Goals	Apps	Goals	Apps	Goals	Apps	Goals
Bayern Munich II	2025–26	Regionalliga Bayern	1	0	—		—		0	0	1	0
Bayern Munich	2024–25	Bundesliga	0	0	0	0	0	0	1 (Note: Appearance in FIFA Club World Cup)	0	1	0
Bayern Munich	2025–26	Bundesliga	26	5	4	0	8 (Note: Appearances in UEFA Champions League)	4	1 (Note: Appearance in Franz Beckenbauer Supercup)	0	39	9
Bayern Munich	2026–27	Bundesliga	9	2	2	0	4	1	0	0	15	3
Bayern Munich	Total		35	7	6	0	12	5	2	0	55	12
Career total			36	7	6	0	12	5	2	0	56	12

=== International ===
As of match played 16 November 2026

Appearances and goals by national team and year
National team	Year	Apps	Goals
Germany	2026	5	0
Total		5	0

== Honours ==
Bayern Munich

- Bundesliga: 2025–26
- DFB-Pokal: 2025–26
- Franz Beckenbauer Supercup: 2025

Individual

- Bundesliga Goal of the Month: October 2025
- Fritz Walter Medal: U17 Silver Medal 2025
