= Filip Pavić =

Croatian footballer (born 2010)

Personal information
- Date of birth: 19 January 2010 (age 16)
- Place of birth: Freising, Germany
- Height: 1.93 m (6 ft 4 in)
- Positions: Centre-back; right-back; defensive midfielder

Team information
- Current team: Bayern Munich
- Number: 43

Youth career
- –2019: SV Waldperlach
- 2019–: Bayern Munich

Senior career*
Years	Team	Apps	(Gls)
2026–	Bayern Munich	0	(0)
2026–	Bayern Munich II	12	(0)

International career^{‡}
2025	Germany U15	2	(0)
2025–2026	Germany U16	11	(0)
2026–	Croatia U17	4	(0)
2026–	Croatia U18	4	(0)
- * Club domestic league appearances and goals as of 7 November 2026 ‡ National team caps and goals as of 20 November 2026

Filip Pavić (born 19 January 2010) is a professional footballer who plays as a centre-back, right-back and defensive midfielder for Bundesliga club Bayern Munich. Born in Germany, he is a youth international for Croatia.

== Club career ==
=== Bayern Munich ===
Pavić is a youth product of SV Waldperlach, in 2019 he joined the youth academy of Bundesliga side Bayern Munich with whom he progressed and continued his development. In September 2025, he was called up by Bayern Munich's head coach Vincent Kompany to train with the senior team squad. On 13 January 2026, Pavić extended his contract with Bayern Munich, along with under-17's teammate Xaver Pucci.

He received his first call-up and made his professional debut with the Bayern Munich senior team on 18 March 2026, during the 4–1 home win UEFA Champions League round of 16 match against Italian Serie A club Atalanta, substituting Josip Stanišić at the 72nd minute. Hence, he became Bayern Munich's youngest player in the UEFA Champions League, aged 16 years and 58 days, breaking the previous record of Paul Wanner. He is also the first ever player born in 2010 to feature in the UEFA Champions League. Three days later, on March 21, Pavić was called up with the Bayern Munich senior team for the 4–0 home win Bundesliga match against Union Berlin, as an unused substitute however.

He received his first call-up with Bayern Munich II on 8 May 2026, making his first professional start and his debut with the reserve team during a 1–1 home draw Regionalliga Bayern match against VfB Eichstätt. Eight days later, Pavić started with Bayern Munich II once again, during a 5–0 away win Regionalliga Bayern match against Viktoria Aschaffenburg, on May 16.

== International career ==
Born in Freising, Germany, Pavić holds dual German and Croatian citizenship, making him eligible to represent either nation, he represented Germany at the under-15 and under-16 levels.

In May 2026, he decided to switch allegiance and represent Croatia at youth international level. Pavić was nominated by the Croatian Football Federation for the U17s upcoming matches, starting on 25 May. Subsequently, getting called up for the 2026 UEFA European Under-17 Championship. In September 2026, he was called up with the U18s team. Pavić was one of the players who were called up with the Croatia U17 for the 2026 FIFA U-17 World Cup in Qatar, by head coach Marijan Budimir.

== Career statistics ==
As of match played 7 November 2026

Appearances and goals by club, season and competition
Club	Season	League			National cup		Europe		Other		Total	
Club	Season	Division	Apps	Goals	Apps	Goals	Apps	Goals	Apps	Goals	Apps	Goals
Bayern Munich	2025–26	Bundesliga	0	0	0	0	1 (Note: Appearance in UEFA Champions League)	0	0	0	1	0
Bayern Munich II	2025–26	Regionalliga Bayern	2	0	—		—		—		2	0
Bayern Munich II	2026–27	Regionalliga Bayern	10	0	—		—		0	0	10	0
Career Total			12	0	0	0	1	0	0	0	13	0
