= Gabriel Marušić =

Croatian footballer (born 2003)

Personal information
- Full name: Gabriel Marušić
- Date of birth: March 3, 2003 (age 23)
- Place of birth: Nuremberg, Germany
- Height: 1.86 m (6 ft 1 in)
- Position: Defender

Youth career
- –2017: 1. FC Nürnberg
- 2017–2022: Bayern Munich

Senior career*
Years	Team	Apps	(Gls)
2021–2025	Bayern Munich II	37	(1)
2022–2025	Bayern Munich	0	(0)
2025–	Austria Salzburg	24	(0)

International career^{‡}
2017	Croatia U14	2	(1)
2019	Croatia U16	3	(0)
2020	Croatia U17	3	(0)
2021	Croatia U18	1	(0)
- * Club domestic league appearances and goals as of 17 May 2026 ‡ National team caps and goals as of 7 September 2021

Gabriel Marušić (born 3 March 2003) is a professional footballer who plays as a defender. Born in Germany, he represented Croatia at youth level internationally.

== Early life ==
Marušić was born in Nuremberg, Germany, and started playing football at the age of five. He joined the youth academy of German side 1. FC Nürnberg at the age of eight. Later he joined the youth academy of German Bundesliga side Bayern Munich at the age of fourteen on 2017.

== Club career ==
=== Bayern Munich ===
He started his professional career with the reserve team Bayern Munich II. On 11 March 2022, he debuted for the club during a 3–0 Regionalliga Bayern win over SpVgg Unterhaching.

Marušić has been called-up twice with the Bayern Munich senior team. The first time for a 2–0 home win UEFA Champions League stage group match against Italian Serie A club Inter Milan on 1 November 2022. The second time for a 6–1 home win Bundesliga match against Werder Bremen on 8 November 2022. Both times as an unused substitute.

=== Austria Salzburg ===
On 29 July 2025, Marušić moved to Austria and joined recently 2. Liga promoted club Austria Salzburg, permanently for an undisclosed transfer fee.

== International career ==
Marušić has represented Croatia internationally from under-14 on 2017, to under-18 level on 2021.

== Career statistics ==
=== Club ===
As of match played 13 December 2025

Appearances and goals by club, season and competition
Club	Season	League			National cup		Other		Total	
Club	Season	Division	Apps	Goals	Apps	Goals	Apps	Goals	Apps	Goals
Bayern Munich II	2021–22	Regionalliga Bayern	12	0	—		—		12	0
Bayern Munich II	2022–23	Regionalliga Bayern	10	0	—		—		10	0
Bayern Munich II	2023–24	Regionalliga Bayern	0	0	—		—		0	0
Bayern Munich II	2024–25	Regionalliga Bayern	14	1	—		—		14	1
Bayern Munich II	2025–26	Regionalliga Bayern	1	0	—		—		1	0
Bayern Munich II	Total		37	1	—		—		37	1
Bayern Munich	2022–23	Bundesliga	0	0	0	0	0	0	0	0
Bayern Munich	Total		0	0	0	0	0	0	0	0
Austria Salzburg	2025–26	2. Liga	15	0	—		0	0	15	0
Austria Salzburg	Total		15	0	0	0	0	0	15	0
Career total			52	1	0	0	0	0	52	1

== Style of play ==
He mainly operates as a centre-back and can also play as a left-back.

== Personal life ==
Marušić has regarded Spain international Sergio Ramos as his football idol. He is the son of Damir Marušić and Antonija Marušić.
