= Benedikt Wimmer =

German footballer (born 2005)

Personal information
- Date of birth: 12 February 2005 (age 21)
- Place of birth: Altötting, Germany
- Height: 2.00 m (6 ft 7 in)
- Position: Centre-back

Team information
- Current team: Bayern Munich II

Youth career
- SV Gendorf-Burgkirchen
- –2016: SV Wacker Burghausen
- 2016–2024: Bayern Munich

Senior career*
Years	Team	Apps	(Gls)
2023–	Bayern Munich II	19	(0)
2024–2025	→ Wuppertaler SV (loan)	21	(3)
2025–2026	→ SV Sandhausen (loan)	26	(0)
- * Club domestic league appearances and goals as of 3 October 2026

Benedikt Wimmer (born 12 February 2005) is a German professional footballer who plays as a centre-back for Regionalliga Bayern club Bayern Munich II.

== Club career ==
=== Bayern Munich ===
Wimmer is a youth product of SV Gendorf-Burgkirchen and SV Wacker Burghausen, in 2016 at the age of 11 he moved to the youth academy of Bayern Munich.

He was promoted to the reserve team Bayern Munich II for the 2023–24 season, and made his professional debut during a 4–1 home loss Regionalliga Bayern match against Türkgücü München, on 28 July 2023.

On 10 July 2025, before being loaned out for a second time, he extended his contract with Bayern Munich until 2027.

==== Loan to Wuppertaler SV ====
On 29 August 2024, Wimmer joined Regionalliga West club Wuppertaler SV, on loan for the 2024–25 season. He scored his first professional goal with Wuppertaler SV, during a 2–2 home draw Regionalliga West match against SV Rödinghausen, on 15 March 2025.

==== Loan to SV Sandhausen ====
On 10 July 2025, Wimmer joined recently relegated Regionalliga Südwest club SV Sandhausen, on loan for the 2025–26 season. He was called-up for the 2025–26 DFB-Pokal first round match against RB Leipzig, which SV Sandhausen lost 4–2 at home on 16 August 2025, but did not play however.

== Career statistics ==
=== Club ===
As of 3 October 2026

Appearances and goals by club, season and competition
Club	Season	League			National cup		Other		Total	
Club	Season	Division	Apps	Goals	Apps	Goals	Apps	Goals	Apps	Goals
Bayern Munich II	2023–24	Regionalliga Bayern	15	0	—		—		15	0
Bayern Munich II	2024–25	Regionalliga Bayern	2	0	—		—		2	0
Bayern Munich II	2026–27	Regionalliga Bayern	2	0	—		—		2	0
Bayern Munich II	Total		19	0	—		—		19	0
Wuppertaler SV (loan)	2024–25	Regionalliga West	21	3	—		3 (Note: Appearances in Niederrheinpokal)	0	0	0
Wuppertaler SV (loan)	Total		21	3	—		3	0	24	3
SV Sandhausen (loan)	2025–26	Regionalliga Südwest	26	0	0	0	3 (Note: Appearances in Badenpokal)	0	29	0
SV Sandhausen (loan)	Total		26	0	0	0	3	0	29	0
Career total			66	3	0	0	6	0	72	3
