= Konrad Laimer =

Austrian footballer (born 1997)

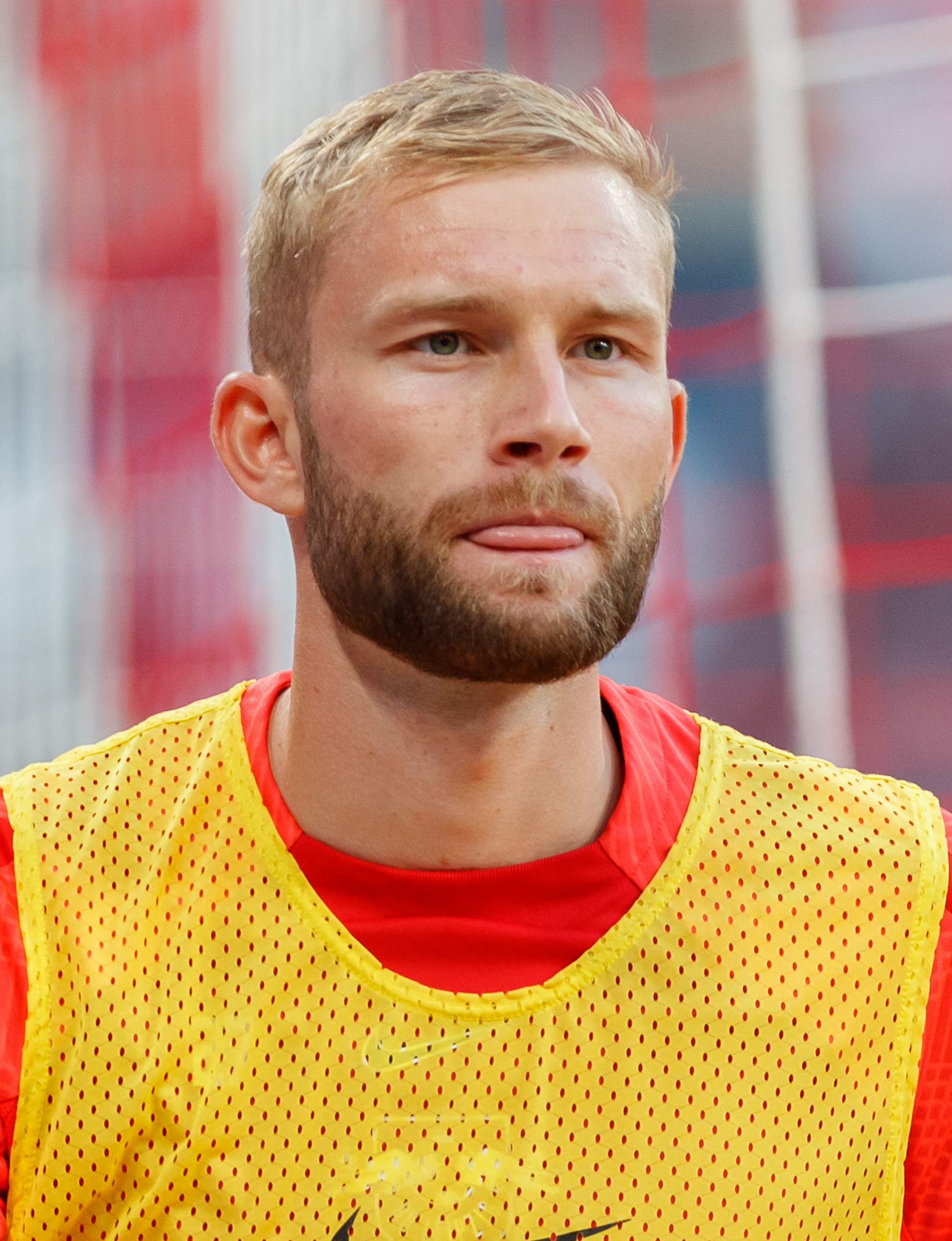
- Laimer with RB Leipzig in 2022

Personal information
- Full name: Konrad Laimer
- Date of birth: 27 May 1997 (age 29)
- Place of birth: Salzburg, Austria
- Height: 1.80 m (5 ft 11 in)
- Positions: Full-back; midfielder

Team information
- Current team: Bayern Munich
- Number: 27

Youth career
- 2002–2007: USC Abersee
- 2007–2014: Red Bull Salzburg

Senior career*
Years	Team	Apps	(Gls)
2014–2016	FC Liefering	19	(0)
2014–2017	Red Bull Salzburg	77	(8)
2017–2023	RB Leipzig	130	(10)
2023–	Bayern Munich	94	(6)

International career^{‡}
2012–2013	Austria U16	14	(1)
2013–2014	Austria U17	9	(0)
2014	Austria U18	1	(0)
2014–2016	Austria U19	18	(0)
2015	Austria U20	5	(0)
2016–2018	Austria U21	13	(2)
2019–	Austria	65	(7)
- * Club domestic league appearances and goals as of 21:25, 20 November 2026 (UTC) ‡ National team caps and goals as of 22:15, 17 November 2026 (UTC)

Konrad Laimer (born 27 May 1997) is an Austrian professional footballer who plays as a full-back or midfielder for Bundesliga club Bayern Munich and the Austria national team.

Laimer previously played in Austria with FC Liefering and Red Bull Salzburg, before moving to German Bundesliga side RB Leipzig in 2017. After making 190 appearances for the club across six seasons, he moved to fellow Bundesliga club Bayern Munich.

A former Austrian youth international across several levels, Laimer made his senior debut for his country in June 2019. He was later selected to the squads for the 2020 and 2024 UEFA European Championships, and the 2026 FIFA World Cup. Laimer was selected as Austrian Footballer of the Year in 2025.

== Club career ==
=== Red Bull Salzburg ===
A youth product of Red Bull Salzburg, Laimer made his Erste Liga debut with the reserve team and feeder club FC Liefering on 2 May 2014 against SV Horn. He made his first team debut on 28 September against Rapid Wien, replacing Alan in added time.

=== RB Leipzig ===
On 30 June 2017, Laimer moved to Germany and joined RB Leipzig on a four-year deal. He made his debut for the club in a 2–0 loss to FC Schalke in the Bundesliga on 19 August.

On 27 January 2019, Laimer scored his first Bundesliga goal in a 4–0 away win over Fortuna Düsseldorf. On 23 October, he netted his first UEFA Champions League goal in a 2–1 victory over Zenit Saint Petersburg.

Laimer's contract with Leipzig was due to expire in 2021, but he later signed a two-year contract extension, running until June 2023.

He won the DFB-Pokal in 2022 and 2023 with Leipzig. On 3 June 2023, after their victory in the latter tournament, Laimer announced his decision to depart Leipzig at the expiration of his contract, ending his six-year stay with the club.

=== Bayern Munich ===
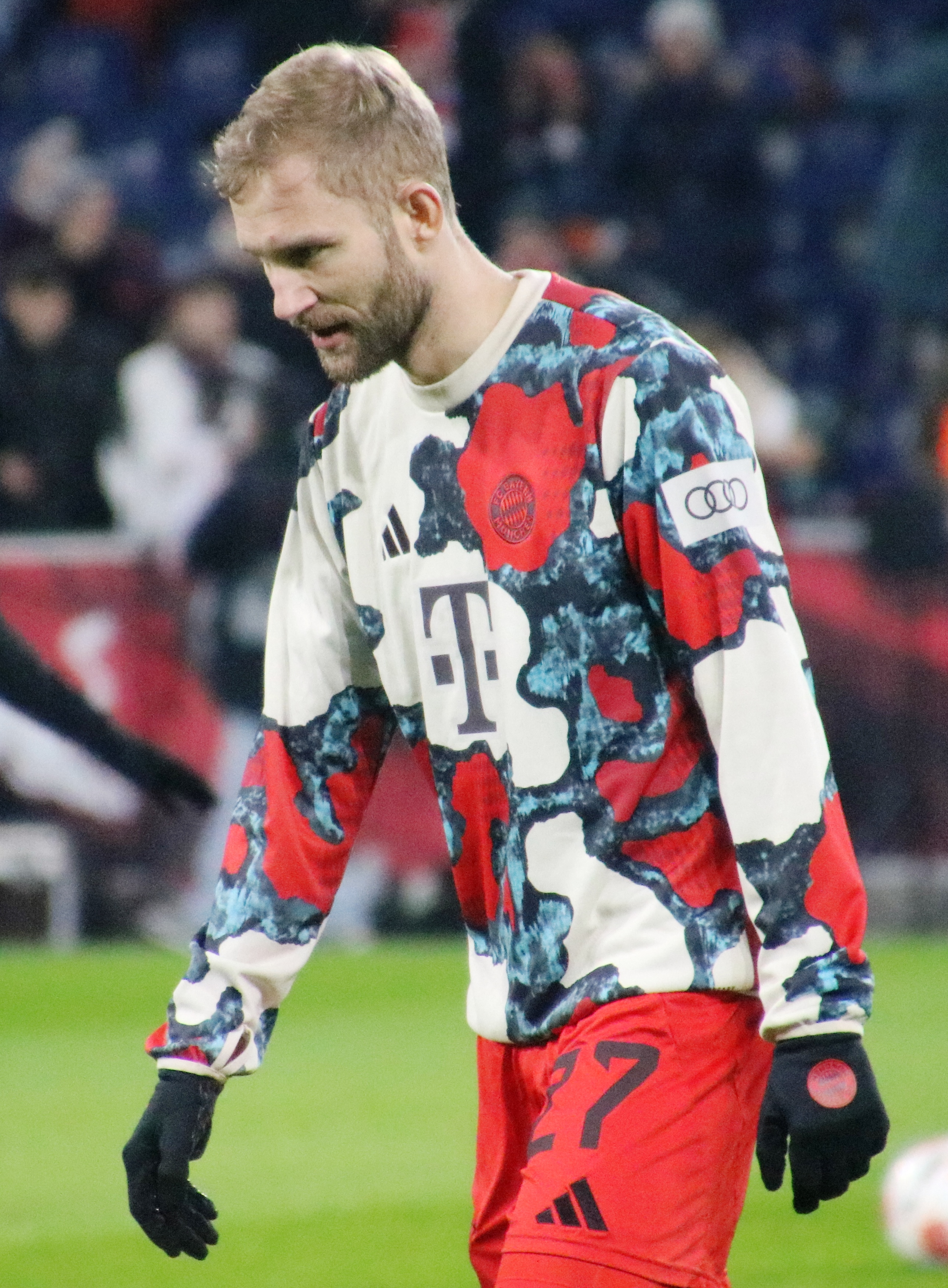
Laimer warming up for Bayern Munich in 2025

On 9 June 2023, fellow Bundesliga side Bayern Munich announced that they had signed Laimer as a free agent on a four-year deal until 30 June 2027. On 8 August, Laimer changed his shirt number at Bayern from 24 to his preferred number, 27. The number had become vacant after previous owner Yann Sommer left the club. On 26 September, he scored his first goal for Bayern in a 4–0 away win over Preußen Münster in the DFB-Pokal.

On 10 December 2024, he netted his first Champions League goal with Bayern in a 5–1 away win over Shakhtar Donetsk. In May 2025, Laimer won his first title with Bayern Munich, the 2024–25 Bundesliga. On 20 July 2026, he extended his contract with the club for three more seasons, until 2029.

== International career ==
Laimer received his first call-up to the Austrian senior squad for 2018 FIFA World Cup qualification matches against Wales and Georgia in September 2017, though he did not make any appearances. Nearly two years later on 7 June 2019, he debuted as a starter in a UEFA Euro 2020 qualifying against Slovenia.

On 7 June 2024, Laimer was named in the Austria squad for the UEFA Euro 2024.

On 18 May 2026, Laimer was selected in Ralf Rangnick’s 26-man squad for the 2026 FIFA World Cup, marking Austria’s first appearance in the tournament since 1998.

== Career statistics ==
=== Club ===
As of match played 20 November 2026

Appearances and goals by club, season and competition
Club	Season	League			National cup (Note: Includes Austrian Cup, DFB-Pokal)		Europe		Other		Total	
Club	Season	Division	Apps	Goals	Apps	Goals	Apps	Goals	Apps	Goals	Apps	Goals
FC Liefering	2013–14	Erste Liga	3	0	0	0	—		—		3	0
FC Liefering	2014–15	Erste Liga	8	0	0	0	—		—		8	0
FC Liefering	2015–16	Erste Liga	8	0	0	0	—		—		8	0
FC Liefering	Total		19	0	0	0	—		—		19	0
Red Bull Salzburg	2014–15	Austrian Bundesliga	8	0	2	0	3 (Note: Appearances in UEFA Europa League)	0	—		13	0
Red Bull Salzburg	2015–16	Austrian Bundesliga	18	1	3	3	0	0	—		21	4
Red Bull Salzburg	2016–17	Austrian Bundesliga	31	3	2	1	10 (Note: Six appearances in UEFA Champions League, four appearances in UEFA Europa League)	0	—		43	4
Red Bull Salzburg	Total		57	4	7	4	13	0	—		77	8
RB Leipzig	2017–18	Bundesliga	22	0	2	0	5 (Note: One appearance in UEFA Champions League, four appearances in UEFA Europa League)	0	—		29	0
RB Leipzig	2018–19	Bundesliga	29	1	6	0	8	1	—		43	2
RB Leipzig	2019–20	Bundesliga	29	2	3	1	10 (Note: Appearances in UEFA Champions League)	1	—		42	4
RB Leipzig	2020–21	Bundesliga	3	0	1	0	0	0	—		4	0
RB Leipzig	2021–22	Bundesliga	26	4	5	1	12 (Note: Six appearances in UEFA Champions League, six appearances in UEFA Europa League)	0	—		43	5
RB Leipzig	2022–23	Bundesliga	21	3	4	1	3	0	1 (Note: Appearance in DFL-/Franz Beckenbauer Supercup)	0	29	4
RB Leipzig	Total		130	10	21	3	38	2	1	0	190	15
Bayern Munich	2023–24	Bundesliga	29	0	2	1	11	0	1	0	43	1
Bayern Munich	2024–25	Bundesliga	29	2	2	0	10	1	4 (Note: Appearances in FIFA Club World Cup)	0	45	3
Bayern Munich	2025–26	Bundesliga	29	3	6	0	11	0	1	0	47	3
Bayern Munich	2026–27	Bundesliga	7	1	2	0	4	1	1	0	14	2
Bayern Munich	Total		94	6	12	1	36	2	7	0	149	9
Career total			300	20	40	8	87	4	8	0	435	32

=== International ===
As of match played 17 November 2026

Appearances and goals by national team and year
National team	Year	Apps	Goals
Austria	2019	7	1
Austria	2020	0	0
Austria	2021	11	1
Austria	2022	6	0
Austria	2023	8	2
Austria	2024	14	1
Austria	2025	9	2
Austria	2026	10	0
Total		65	7

As of match played 9 October 2025
Scores and results list Austria's goal tally first, score column indicates score after each Laimer goal.

List of international goals scored by Konrad Laimer
No.	Date	Venue	Opponent	Score	Result	Competition
1	6 September 2019	Stadion Wals-Siezenheim, Wals-Siezenheim, Austria	Latvia	5–0	6–0	UEFA Euro 2020 qualifying
2	9 October 2021	Tórsvøllur, Tórshavn, Faroe Islands	Faroe Islands	1–0	2–0	2022 FIFA World Cup qualification
3	13 October 2023	Ernst-Happel-Stadion, Vienna, Austria	Belgium	1–3	2–3	UEFA Euro 2024 qualifying
4	16 November 2023	Lilleküla Stadium, Tallinn, Estonia	Estonia	1–0	2–0	UEFA Euro 2024 qualifying
5	6 September 2024	Stožice Stadium, Ljubljana, Slovenia	Slovenia	1–1	1–1	2024–25 UEFA Nations League B
6	9 September 2025	Bilino Polje Stadium, Zenica, Bosnia and Herzegovina	Bosnia and Herzegovina	2–1	2–1	2026 FIFA World Cup qualification
7	9 October 2025	Ernst-Happel-Stadion, Vienna, Austria	San Marino	6–0	10–0	2026 FIFA World Cup qualification

== Honours ==
Red Bull Salzburg

- Austrian Bundesliga: 2014–15, 2015–16, 2016–17
- Austrian Cup: 2014–15, 2015–16, 2016–17

RB Leipzig

- DFB-Pokal: 2021–22, 2022–23; runner-up: 2020–21

Bayern Munich

- Bundesliga: 2024–25, 2025–26
- DFB-Pokal: 2025–26
- Franz Beckenbauer Supercup: 2025, 2026

Individual

- UEFA Europa League Team of the Season: 2021–22
- Austrian Footballer of the Year: 2025
- VDV Bundesliga Team of the Season: 2025–26
