= Lukas Schneller =

German footballer

Personal information
- Full name: Lukas Konstantin Schneller
- Date of birth: 26 October 2001 (age 25)
- Place of birth: Munich, Germany
- Height: 1.90 m (6 ft 3 in)
- Position: Goalkeeper

Team information
- Current team: SV Sandhausen
- Number: 31

Youth career
- 2010–2012: TSV Moosach bei Grafing
- 2012–2020: Bayern Munich

Senior career*
Years	Team	Apps	(Gls)
2019–2025	Bayern Munich II	20	(0)
2020–2025	Bayern Munich	0	(0)
2024	→ SC Freiburg II (loan)	2	(0)
2024–2025	→ 1. FC Schweinfurt 05 (loan)	32	(0)
2025–	SV Sandhausen	27	(0)
- * Club domestic league appearances and goals as of 24 September 2026

Lukas Konstantin Schneller (born 26 October 2001) is a German professional footballer who plays as a goalkeeper for Regionalliga Südwest club SV Sandhausen.

== Career ==
=== Bayern Munich ===
Schneller made his professional debut for Bayern Munich II in the 3. Liga on 28 November 2020, starting in the away match against Hansa Rostock, which finished as a 0–2 loss.

Schneller has been called-up four times with the Bayern Munich senior team. First for a 1–1 away draw UEFA Champions League stage group match against Spanish La Liga club Atlético Madrid on 1 December 2020. The second time for the 2–0 win FIFA Club World Cup semi-finals match against Egyptian Premier League club Al Ahly on 8 February 2021, as the team advanced to the final he was called up again for the match, as Bayern Munich won the tournament beating 1–0 Mexican Liga MX club Tigres UANL, ultimately being crowned as the champions. The fourth time for a 2–1 home win UEFA Champions League round of 16 match against Italian Serie A club Lazio on 17 March 2021. The four times he was an unused substitute.

==== Loan to SC Freiburg II ====
On 23 January 2024, he renewed his contract until 2026 and was sent on loan to 3. Liga club SC Freiburg II for the rest of the season.

==== Loan to 1. FC Schweinfurt 05 ====
On 15 July 2024, he joined Regionalliga Bayern club 1. FC Schweinfurt 05 on loan for the 2024–25 season. On 2 May 2025, after a 2–1 home win Regionalliga Bayern match against Würzburger Kickers, 1. FC Schweinfurt 05 became champions of the 2024–25 season, with Schneller helping them achieve a promotion to the 3. Liga and DFB-Pokal qualification for the next season.

=== SV Sandhausen ===
On 1 September 2025, after 13 years with Bayern Munich, Schneller left the club and moved to Regionalliga Südwest club SV Sandhausen permanently, ahead of the 2025–26 season.

== Career statistics ==
=== Club ===
As of match played 6 December 2025

Appearances and goals by club, season and competition
Club	Season	League			National cup		Continental		Other		Total	
Club	Season	Division	Apps	Goals	Apps	Goals	Apps	Goals	Apps	Goals	Apps	Goals
Bayern Munich II	2018–19	Regionalliga Bayern	0	0	—		—		—		0	0
Bayern Munich II	2019–20	3. Liga	0	0	—		—		—		0	0
Bayern Munich II	2020–21	3. Liga	10	0	—		—		—		10	0
Bayern Munich II	2021–22	Regionalliga Bayern	4	0	—		—		—		4	0
Bayern Munich II	2022–23	Regionalliga Bayern	0	0	—		—		—		0	0
Bayern Munich II	2023–24	Regionalliga Bayern	6	0	—		—		—		6	0
Bayern Munich II	2025–26	Regionalliga Bayern	0	0	—		—		—		0	0
Bayern Munich II	Total		20	0	—		—		—		20	0
Bayern Munich	2020–21	Bundesliga	0	0	0	0	0	0	0	0	0	0
Bayern Munich	Total		0	0	0	0	0	0	0	0	0	0
SC Freiburg II (loan)	2023–24	3. Liga	2	0	—		—		—		2	0
SC Freiburg II (loan)	Total		2	0	—		—		—		2	0
1. FC Schweinfurt 05 (loan)	2024–25	Regionalliga Bayern	30	0	2 (Note: Appearances in the Bavarian Cup)	0	—		—		32	0
1. FC Schweinfurt 05 (loan)	Total		30	0	2	0	—		—		32	0
SV Sandhausen	2025–26	Regionalliga Südwest	13	0	2 (Note: Appearances in the Baden Cup)	0	—		—		15	0
SV Sandhausen	Total		13	0	2	0	—		—		32	0
Career Total			63	0	4	0	0	0	0	0	67	0

== Honours ==
Bayern Munich

- FIFA Club World Cup: 2020

1. FC Schweinfurt 05

- Regionalliga Bayern: 2024–25
