= Valentin Yotov (footballer) =

American born-Bulgarian footballer (born 2006)

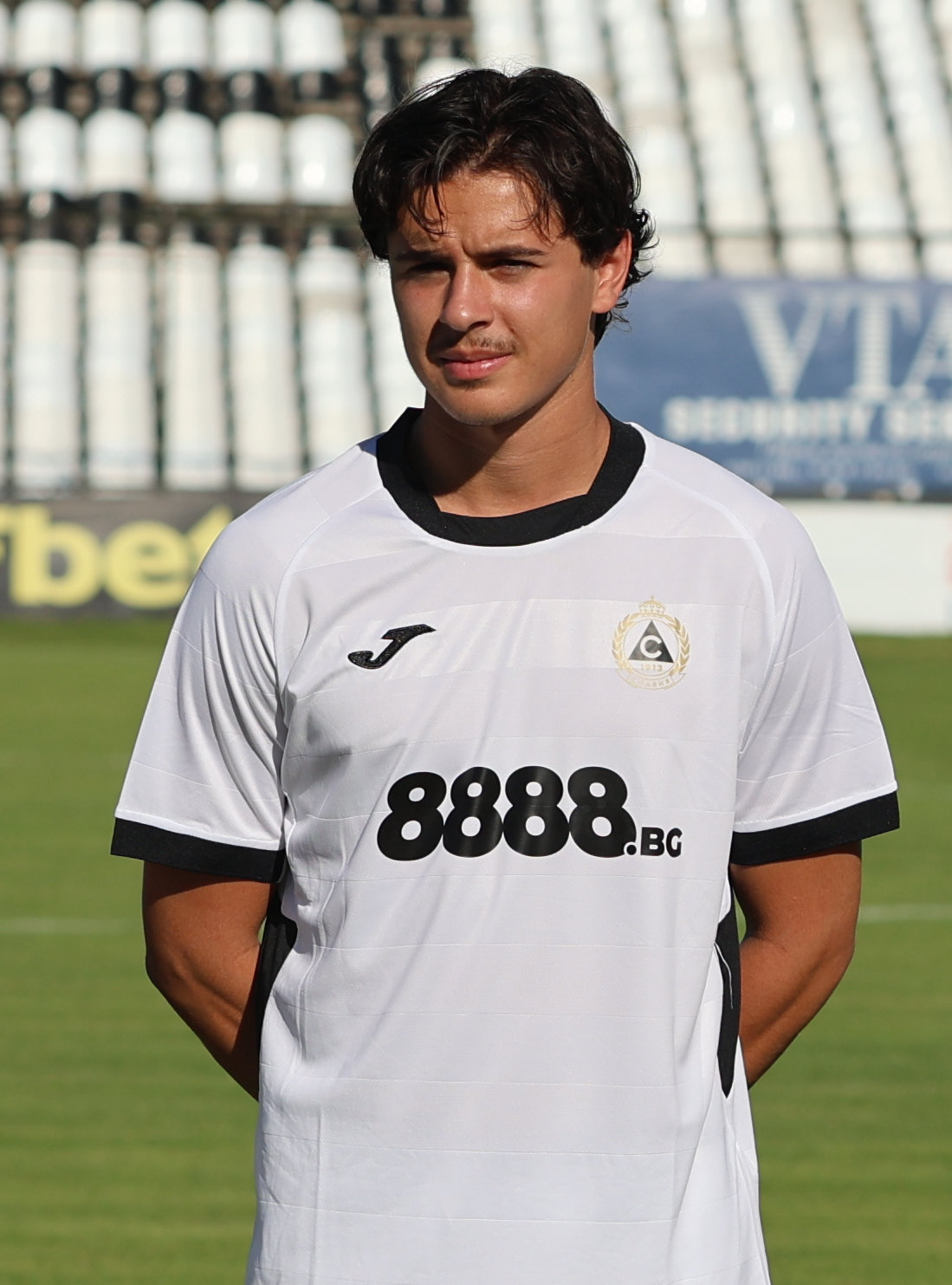

Personal information
- Full name: Valentin Yotov
- Date of birth: 18 January 2006 (age 20)
- Place of birth: Boston, Massachusetts, United States
- Positions: Attacking midfielder; forward

Youth career
- –2018: Philadelphia Union
- 2018–2025: Bayern Munich

Senior career*
Years	Team	Apps	(Gls)
2025	Glacis United	3	(0)
2026	Slavia Sofia	6	(0)
2026	Slavia II	1	(0)

International career
2023	Bulgaria U18	1	(0)
2023–2024	Bulgaria U19	5	(0)
- * Club domestic league appearances and goals

Valentin Yotov (Bulgarian: Валентин Йотов; born 18 January 2006) is a former professional footballer who played as an attacking midfielder and forward. Born in the United States, he represented Bulgaria at the youth level internationally.

== Early life ==
Yotov was born on 18 January 2006 in Boston, Massachusetts, United States, to Bulgarians Yoto Yotov, an economics professor, and Anelia Yotova, who obtained a master's degree in economics. The older brother of Ivan Yotov, he started playing football at the age of five and regarded England international Jadon Sancho as his football idol.

== Club career ==
Growing up in the United States, Yotov played futsal. At the age of twelve, he joined the youth academy of MLS side Philadelphia Union. In 2018, he moved to Germany, and joined the youth academy of Bundesliga side Bayern Munich. Five years later, he was promoted to the club's under-19 team. On 11 October 2023, he was named by English newspaper The Guardian as one of the best players born in 2006 worldwide. Following the end of the 2024–25 season, Yotov's contract was not renewed and he became a free agent.

In August 2025, he signed with Gibraltar Football League club Glacis United as a free agent, ahead of the 2025–26 season.

Yotov signed with Bulgarian Parva Liga club Slavia Sofia on 1 January 2026, as a free agent. On 12 August 2026, after just another knee injury, he decided to retire as a footballer and return to Philadelphia, Pennsylvania, to study.

== International career ==
Born in the United States to Bulgarian parents, Yotov is eligible to represent United States or Bulgaria internationally. He has represented Bulgaria at the youth levels, having featured with the U18s and U19s.

== Career statistics ==
As of match played 20 September 2025

Appearances and goals by club, season and competition
Club	Season	League			Cup		Continental		Other		Total	
Club	Season	Division	Apps	Goals	Apps	Goals	Apps	Goals	Apps	Goals	Apps	Goals
Glacis United	2025–26	Gibraltar Football League	2	0	—		—		0	0	2	0
Glacis United	Total		2	0	—		—		0	0	2	0
Career Total			1	0	0	0	0	0	0	0	2	0
