= Felipe Chávez =

Peruvian footballer (born 2007)

Personal information
- Full name: Felipe Marlon Chávez Somocursio
- Date of birth: 10 April 2007 (age 19)
- Place of birth: Aichach, Germany
- Height: 1.77 m (5 ft 10 in)
- Positions: Midfielder; winger

Team information
- Current team: 1. FC Magdeburg; (on loan from Bayern Munich)
- Number: 11

Youth career
- 2017–2019: FC Augsburg
- 2019–2025: Bayern Munich

Senior career*
Years	Team	Apps	(Gls)
2024–	Bayern Munich II	19	(4)
2025–	Bayern Munich	2	(0)
2026	→ 1. FC Köln (loan)	7	(0)
2026–	→ 1. FC Magdeburg (loan)	9	(1)

International career^{‡}
2022–2023	Peru U17	3	(0)
2024–	Peru U20	4	(0)
2025–	Peru	1	(0)
- * Club domestic league appearances and goals as of 23:45, 20 November 2026 (UTC) ‡ National team caps and goals as of 23:45, 10 October 2025 (UTC)

Felipe Marlon Chávez Somocursio (born 10 April 2007) is a professional footballer who plays as a midfielder and winger for 2. Bundesliga club 1. FC Magdeburg, on loan from Bayern Munich. Born in Germany, he plays for the Peru national team.

== Club career ==
=== Bayern Munich ===
Born in Aichach, Germany to a German mother and Peruvian father, Chávez began his career in the youth academy of his hometown club FC Augsburg, before a move to the Bayern Munich youth academy at the age of twelve in 2019.

Chávez received his first call-up for Bayern Munich II on 20 September 2024, and was an unused substitute in a 2–0 Regionalliga Bayern away loss against SpVgg Hankofen-Hailing. He then made his professional debut for the team on 29 October, coming off the bench in the 79th minute of a 4–0 home win against Greuther Fürth II. On 30 June 2025, he signed a new long-term deal with Bayern Munich.

Chávez was one of the players chosen by Bayern first-team head coach Vincent Kompany for their 2025 pre-season matches against French Ligue 1 club Lyon, English Premier League club Tottenham Hotspur, and Swiss Super League club Grasshopper, on 2, 7, and 12 August 2025, respectively. He was a starter and played 62 minutes for Bayern in their 2–1 victory against Grasshopper. Chávez would then be included in Bayern's squad for the 2025–26 UEFA Champions League. He received his first official squad inclusion for the Bayern senior team in their Bundesliga away match against 1. FC Heidenheim on 21 December 2025, but was an unused subtitute in their 4–0 win.

Chávez was included in the squad for Bayern's mid-season friendly match against Austrian Bundesliga club Red Bull Salzburg on 6 January 2026, substituting Raphaël Guerreiro in the second half and scoring Bayern's third goal in the 75th minute. Five days later, he made his official debut for the Bayern first team, substituting Michael Olise in the 83rd minute of his side's 8–1 Bundesliga home win against VfL Wolfsburg.

==== Loan to 1. FC Köln ====
On 2 February 2026, Chávez joined fellow Bundesliga club 1. FC Köln on loan for the remainder of the 2025–26 season.

==== Loan to 1. FC Magdeburg ====
On 26 August 2026, he extended his contract with Bayern Munich until 2028, and subsequently joined 2. Bundesliga club 1. FC Magdeburg on loan for the 2026–27 season, with a buy option. On 28 October 2026, Chávez started with Magdeburg during a 6–1 away loss 2026–27 DFB-Pokal second round match against his parent club.

== International career ==
Chávez was eligible to represent either Germany, France or Peru at international level.

In 2022, Chávez was called up to the German under-15 side. However, in March of the following year, he switched his international allegiance to Peru, and was called up to their under-17 team for the 2023 South American U-17 Championship. Chávez made appearances in two friendlies against Ecuador, before making a further two appearances at the tournament. He made his debut with the Peru under-20 side on 9 May 2024, starting in 1–0 friendly win against Costa Rica.

Chávez received his first call-up to the Peru senior team for their friendly match against Chile on 10 October 2025. He made his full debut for the side during the match, which was played at Estadio Bicentenario de La Florida in Santiago, substituting Jairo Concha in the second half of a 2–1 loss.

== Career statistics ==
=== Club ===
As of match played 28 October 2026

Appearances and goals by club, season and competition
Club	Season	League			National cup (Note: Includes DFB-Pokal)		Continental		Other		Total	
Club	Season	Division	Apps	Goals	Apps	Goals	Apps	Goals	Apps	Goals	Apps	Goals
Bayern Munich II	2024–25	Regionalliga Bayern	11	3	—		—		—		11	3
Bayern Munich II	2025–26	Regionalliga Bayern	8	1	—		—		—		8	1
Bayern Munich II	Total		19	4	—		—		—		19	4
Bayern Munich	2025–26	Bundesliga	2	0	0	0	0	0	0	0	2	0
Bayern Munich	2026–27	Bundesliga	0	0	0	0	0	0	0	0	0	0
Bayern Munich	Total		2	0	0	0	0	0	0	0	2	0
1. FC Köln (loan)	2025–26	Bundesliga	7	0	—		—		0	0	7	0
1. FC Köln (loan)	Total		7	0	—		—		0	0	7	0
1. FC Magdeburg (loan)	2026–27	2. Bundesliga	6	0	1	0	—		0	0	7	0
1. FC Magdeburg (loan)	Total		6	0	1	0	—		0	0	7	0
Career total			34	4	1	0	0	0	0	0	35	4

=== International ===
As of match played 10 October 2025

Appearances and goals by national team and year
National team	Year	Apps	Goals
Peru	2025	1	0
Total		1	0

== Personal life ==
Chávez is the nephew of former footballer Víctor Chávez, who played as a forward for Alfonso Ugarte de Chiclín.
