= Maximilian Hennig =

German footballer (born 2006)

Personal information
- Full name: Maximilian Sebastian Marc Hennig
- Date of birth: 12 October 2006 (age 20)
- Place of birth: Erding, Germany
- Height: 1.81 m (5 ft 11 in)
- Positions: Left-back; midfielder

Team information
- Current team: Bayern Munich II

Youth career
- 2012–2014: FC Ismaning
- 2014–2024: Bayern Munich

Senior career*
Years	Team	Apps	(Gls)
2024–	Bayern Munich II	0	(0)
2024–2025	→ SpVgg Unterhaching (loan)	26	(0)
2024	→ SpVgg Unterhaching II (loan)	3	(0)
2025–2026	→ TSV Hartberg (loan)	28	(1)

International career^{‡}
2021–2022	Germany U16	5	(0)
2022–2023	Germany U17	14	(0)
2024	Germany U18	2	(0)
2024–	Germany U19	6	(0)
Medal record
Men's football
Representing Germany
FIFA U-17 World Cup
Winner	2023 Indonesia
UEFA European Under-17 Championship
Winner	2023 Hungary
- * Club domestic league appearances and goals as of 3 May 2026 ‡ National team caps and goals as of 23 June 2025

Maximilian Sebastian Marc Hennig (born 12 October 2006) is a German professional footballer who plays as a left-back and midfielder for Regionalliga Bayern club Bayern Munich II. He is a German youth international.

== Club career ==
=== Early career ===
Hennig played with the youth academy of FC Ismaning from 2012 to 2014, he then joined the youth academy of Bundesliga side Bayern Munich, with whom he progressed until 2024.

==== Loan to SpVgg Unterhaching ====
After being promoted to Bayern Munich's reserve team, he was immediately loaned to 3. Liga club SpVgg Unterhaching for the 2024–25 season.

==== Loan to TSV Hartberg ====
In 2025, Hennig moved to Austrian Bundesliga club TSV Hartberg on a one-year loan for the 2025–26 season.

== International career ==
He has represented Germany at under-16, under-17 (that won the final of the 2023 UEFA European Under-17 Championship in Hungary, and the 2023 FIFA U-17 World Cup in Indonesia), under-18 and under-19 levels.

== Career statistics ==
As of match played 3 May 2026

Appearances and goals by club, season and competition
Club	Season	League			Cup (Note: Includes Bavarian Cup, Austrian Cup)		Other		Total	
Club	Season	Division	Apps	Goals	Apps	Goals	Apps	Goals	Apps	Goals
SpVgg Unterhaching (loan)	2024–25	3. Liga	26	0	1	0	—		27	0
SpVgg Unterhaching II (loan)	2024–25	Bayernliga Süd	3	0	—		—		3	0
TSV Hartberg (loan)	2025–26	Austrian Bundesliga	28	1	3	0	0	0	31	1
Career total			57	1	4	0	0	0	61	1

== Honours ==
International

Germany U17

- UEFA European Under-17 Championship: 2023
- FIFA U-17 World Cup: 2023
