= Butts (surname) =

Butts is a surname. Notable people with the name include:

- Alan Butts (born 1940), British Olympic wrestler
- Alfred Butts (disambiguation), multiple people
- Anthony Butts (born 1969), American poet
- Arthur C. Butts (1848–1913), American lawyer, judge, and politician
- Augustus De Butts (1770–1853), officer in the Royal Engineers
- Bill Butts (born 1937), American racing driver
- Calvin O. Butts (1949–2022), Pastor of the Abyssinian Baptist Church in the City of New York
- Cassandra Butts (1965–2016), American lawyer
- Cassius F. Butts (born 1971), American business executive
- Charles Butts (disambiguation), multiple people
- Colin Butts (1959–2018), English writer
- Clyde Butts (1957–2023), West Indies cricketer
- George Butts (1838–1902), American soldier, Medal of Honor recipient
- Gerald Butts (born 1971), Canadian political adviser
- Gerard Butts (born 1966), Australian rules footballer
- Evelyn Thomas Butts (1924–1993), American civil rights activist
- Henry Butts, Vice-Chancellor of the University of Cambridge (1629–1631)
- Henry De Butts, United States Army officer, acting Adjutant General and acting Inspector General (1792–1793)
- Ingrid Butts (born 1963), American Olympic cross-country skier
- Isaac Butts (born 1989), American basketball player
- James Butts (disambiguation), multiple people
- Jimmy Butts (1917–1998), American jazz double-bassist
- John Butts (disambiguation), multiple people
- June Dobbs Butts (1928–2019), American educator and writer
- Lisa Butts (born 1982), American rugby union player
- Mr. Butts, fictional character in Garry Trudeau's Doonesbury
- Marie Butts (1870–1953), French educator, translator, and children's book author; first General Secretary of the International Bureau of Education (1926–1953)
- Marion Butts (born 1966), American football running back
- Mary Butts (1890–1937), British modernist writer
- Niya Butts (born 1978), American women's college basketball coach
- Pee Wee Butts (Thomas Lee Butts; 1919–1972), American baseball player
- Peggy Butts (1924–2004), Canadian Senator
- Ray Butts (Joseph Raymond Butts; 1919–2003), American inventor and engineer
- Robert Butts (disambiguation), multiple people
- Samuel Butts (1777–1814), American militia officer in the Creek War
- Seymore Butts (born 1964), American pornographic film director, producer, and actor
- Skyler Butts (born 1993), Hong Kong tennis player
- Tasha Butts (born 1982), American women's basketball player and coach
- Terry L. Butts (born 1944), justice of the Supreme Court of Alabama
- Thomas Butts (1757–1845), British senior civil servant, and patron to the artist and poet William Blake
- Vibert Butts (born 1956 or 1957), Guyanese soccer player
- Vernon Butts, American serial killer and accomplice of William Bonin
- W. E. Butts (Walter E. Butts; 1944–2013), American poet
- Wally Butts (1905–1973), University of Georgia football head coach and athletic director
- Wanda Butts, American swimming activist
- William Butts (c. 1486 – 1545), member of King Henry VIII of England's court

== See also ==
- Charles W. Buttz (1837–1913), American politician
- Buts, surname
- Butz, surname
- Butt (surname)
