= Butt (surname) =

Butt is a German and an English surname whose origins lie in the South West peninsula region of England.

== Etymology ==
The surname Butt or Butts is said to be derived from the French word "but" which is a noun meaning "target". The English name is derived from the Middle English word "but", a noun meaning a mark for archery, a target or goal, or someone's rear end. The name may derive from the butt, a strip of ploughland shorter than the average length of one furlong.

== History ==
Anglo-Norman names are characterised by a multitude of spelling variations. When the Normans became the ruling people of England in the 11th century, they introduced a new language into a society where the main languages of Old and later Middle English had no definite spelling rules. These languages were more often spoken than written, so they blended freely with one another. Contributing to this mixing of tongues was the fact that medieval scribes spelled words according to sound, ensuring that a person's name would appear differently in nearly every document in which it was recorded. The name has been spelled Butt, But, Butte and others.

=== England ===
The surname can also be found in England where it is again of patronymic origin, meaning "son of Butt". First found in Middlesex where they were anciently seated, and were granted lands by William the Conqueror, and recorded in the Domesday Book compiled in 1086. An early reference to this surname in 1200 England, William de Butte is listed in Oseney. From the archery-related meaning, the surname Butt in England was originally used to describe somebody who either lived near archery butts, or someone who was actually an archer. The name has been particularly popular in Devon and Cornwall since the 17th century, with a number of variants from the same origin including Butts, and two names meaning "Son of Butt": Butson and Butting.

=== Migration to Canada ===
For many English families, the political and religious disarray that plagued their homeland made the frontiers of the New World an attractive prospect. Thousands migrated, aboard cramped disease-ridden ships. They arrived sick, poor and hungry, but were welcomed in many cases with far greater opportunity than at home in England. Many of these hardy settlers went on to make important contributions to the emerging nations in which they landed. Among early immigrants bearing the name Butt or a variant listed above were, Roger Butt who settled in Carbonear, Newfoundland in 1675, John Butt who settled in Conception Bay, Newfoundland in 1706, and Joseph Butt settled in Crocker's Cove, Newfoundland, in the same year.

== Notable people with the surname Butt ==
- Aameen Taqi Butt (born 1946), Pakistani golfer
- Alfred Butt (1878–1962), British theatre entrepreneur, politician and racehorse owner
- Major Archibald Butt (1865–1912), American army officer and advisor
- Anthony Butt, New Zealand jockey
- Brent Butt (born 1966), Canadian stand-up comedian, actor and writer
- Charles Butt, American grocer, son of Howard Butt
- Charles Butt (swim coach) (1925–2018), American swimming coach
- Charles Sinclair Butt (1900–1973), Australian businessman
- Charles Parker Butt (1830–1892), English judge and politician
- Clara Butt (1872–1936), English singer
- Cyrus M. Butt (1833–1921), American politician
- David Butt Phillip, British operatic tenor
- Dudley Butt (born 1946), Manx politician
- Gavin Butt, British art historian
- Gizz Butt, British musician
- Hans-Jörg Butt (born 1974), German footballer
- Harry Butt (1865–1928), English cricketer
- Howard Edward Butt Sr. (1895–1991), American founder of H-E-B grocery chain
- Hugh Butt (1910–2008), American physician
- Isaac Butt (1813–1879), Irish lawyer and politician
- Jake Butt (born 1995), American football player
- John Butt (disambiguation), multiple people
- Lawson Butt (1883–1956), British actor and director
- Len Butt (footballer born 1893) (1893–1993), English footballer
- Len Butt (footballer born 1910) (1910–1994), English footballer
- Maggie Butt, British poet
- Martha Haines Butt (1833–1871), American author, suffragist
- Miriam Butt, German linguist
- Nicky Butt (born 1975), English footballer
- Peter Butt, Australian filmmaker
- Ray Butt (1935–2013), British film and television producer
- Raymond Butt, British schoolteacher
- Ronald Butt (1920–2002), British journalist
- Simon Butt, British diplomat
- Sonya Butt (1924–2014), British WWII spy
- Tameka Butt (now Tameka Yallop; born 1991), Australian association footballer
- Tom Butt, American politician
- Wilfrid Butt (1922–2006), British endocrinologist
- William Butt (c. 1805–1888), American politician
- Yondani Butt, Chinese orchestral conductor and chemist

== See also ==
- But (surname)
- Butts (surname)
