= Thomas Kraft =

German footballer

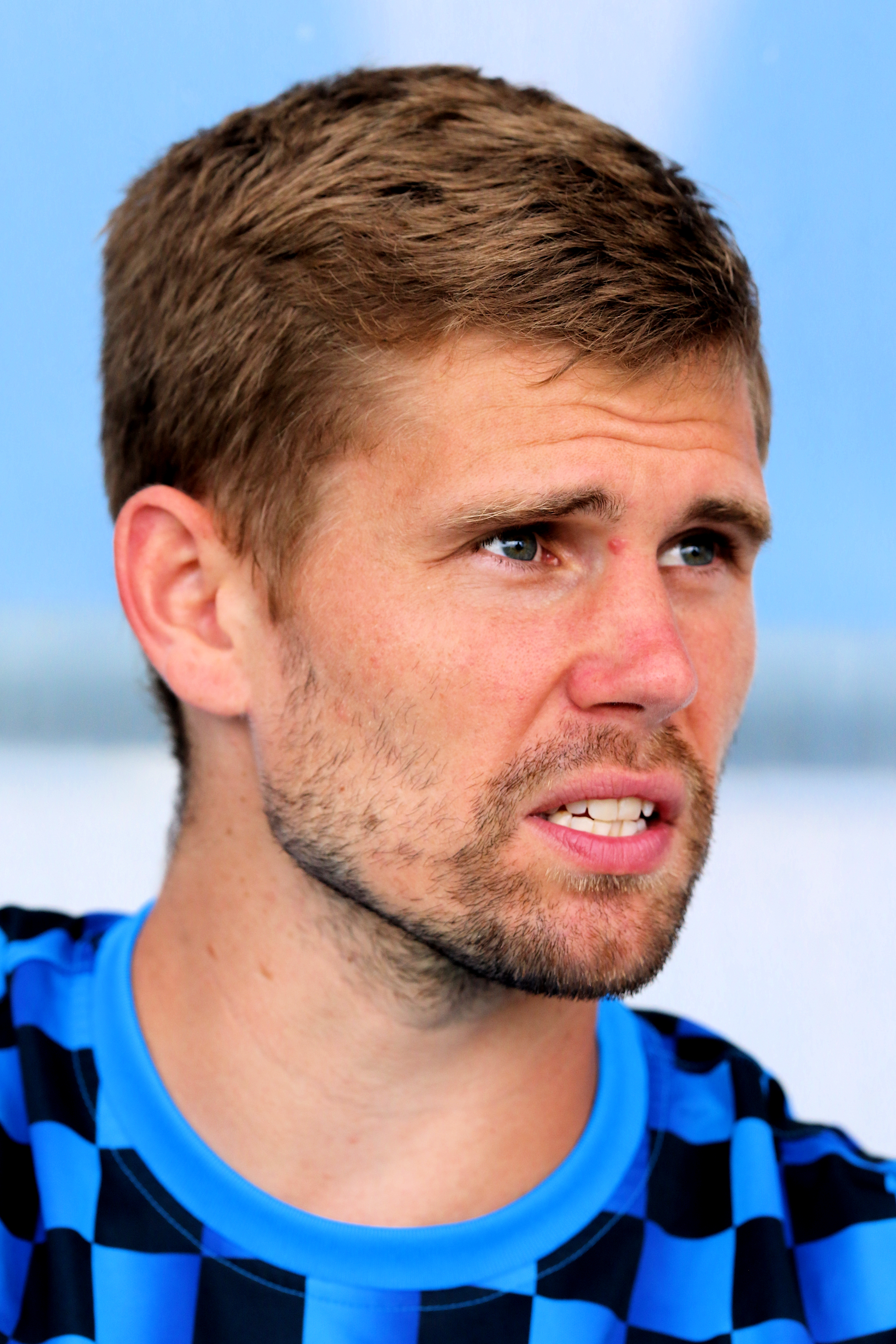
- Kraft at practice with Hertha in 2019.

Personal information
- Full name: Thomas Kraft
- Date of birth: 22 July 1988 (age 38)
- Place of birth: Kirchen, West Germany
- Height: 1.87 m (6 ft 2 in)
- Position: Goalkeeper

Youth career
- 1996–2000: Sportfreunde Daaden
- 2000–2002: VfB Wissen
- 2002–2004: SG Betzdorf
- 2004–2006: Bayern Munich

Senior career*
Years	Team	Apps	(Gls)
2006–2010	Bayern Munich II	103	(0)
2010–2011	Bayern Munich	12	(0)
2011–2020	Hertha BSC	143	(0)
Total		258	(0)

International career
2004	Germany U16	1	(0)
2005	Germany U17	1	(0)
Medal record
Bayern Munich
Winner	Bundesliga	2010
Winner	DFB-Pokal	2010
Runner-up	UEFA Champions League	2010
Winner	DFL-Supercup	2010
- * Club domestic league appearances and goals

Thomas Kraft (born 22 July 1988) is a German former professional footballer who played as a goalkeeper.

== Club career ==
=== Bayern Munich ===
Born in Kirchen, West Germany, Kraft began playing in a goalkeeper position when he was eight years old. Kraft then started out at Sportfreunde Daaden, VfB Wissen and SG Betzdorf before joining Bayern Munich in 2004. He then signed his first professional contract with the club at age seventeen, keeping him until 2008.

Kraft was promoted to the Bayern's reserve team in 2006. However, he spent two years, playing for the club's U19 team as their first choice goalkeeper. In January 2008, Kraft was promoted to the Bayern Munich's first team. He then was included six times as unused substitute into the club's first team throughout 2007–08 season.

After two years being promoted to the Bayern's reserve team, Kraft finally played in their first game in the newly formed 3. Liga on 27 July 2008 against Union Berlin, as the club's reserve team won 2–1 in the opening goal of the season. He then become Bayern's reserve team first choice goalkeeper. Kraft, along with teammates Holger Badstuber and Thomas Müller, having been an unused substitute in a number of first-team matches in the 2008–09 season. However, during a 2–0 win against Carl Zeiss Jena on 1 March 2009, he suffered a broken jaw and a concussion that saw him substituted in the 19th minute. After the match, it was announced that Kraft was announced for eight weeks. But he quickly recovered and returned to the starting line–up against SpVgg Unterhaching on 1 April 2009, in a 2–1 loss. At the end of the 2008–09 season, Kraft went on to make twenty–four appearances in all competitions. At some point at his Bayern Munich's career, he signed a contract with the club, keeping him until 2011.

Ahead of the 2009–10 season, Kraft was promoted to the first team, with Bayern Munich's reserve team Manager Mehmet Scholl would not be using him. However, he suffered a hamstring injury that kept him out for a week. Despite his inclusion in the first team, Kraft continued to be the club's reserve team first choice goalkeeper. Once again, he was an unused substitute in a number of first-team matches in the 2009–10 season. At the end of the 2009–10 season, Kraft went on to make twenty–seven appearances in all competitions.

From 2008 to 2010, Kraft was third-choice goalkeeper for the senior team, behind Hans-Jörg Butt and Michael Rensing. Following Rensing's release in 2010, he was promoted to second choice, and he made his first-team debut at the beginning of that season, in the 2010 DFL-Supercup. After the match, Bayern Munich described his debut as "great" on their website.

The next two months saw Kraft playing for the club's reserve teams, while appearing in the first team as an unused substitute at the same time. On 23 November 2010, he made his debut Champions League match in Rome against Roma, starting the whole game and had a good start and made some outstanding saves, as the club lost 3–2. His next appearance for Bayern Munich came on 8 December 2011 against Basel in the UEFA Champions League match and kept a clean sheet, winning 1–0. During the 2010–11 winter break, Bayern coach Louis van Gaal announced that Kraft would replace Hans-Jörg Butt as Bayern's first-choice 'keeper for the second half of the season. Kraft made his Bundesliga debut as Bayern Munich's first-choice keeper against VfL Wolfsburg on 15 January 2011 and set up the club's only goal of the game, in a 1–1 draw. He then started in the next fifteen matches for Bayern Munich. During a match against Mainz 05 on 19 February 2011, Kraft suffered a bruised skull when he collided with Petar Slišković and was substituted in the 46th minute, as the club won 3–1. Kraft returned to the starting line–up and produced top performance with several impressive saves to help FC Bayern Munich to a 1–0 win on 23 February 2011 in a round of 16 Champions League clash against Inter Milan. In the return leg, however, he was unable to help the club reach the next round after losing 3–2 through away goal. However, the decision to replace Butt with Kraft earned the displeasure of the Bayern board, and contributed to Van Gaal losing his job: after an error by Kraft allowed Christian Eigler to score the equaliser in a 1–1 draw with Nürnberg. Van Gaal – who was already due to leave – was sacked early, and temporarily replaced by his assistant Andries Jonker. Following this, Jonker reinstated Butt at Kraft's expense in his first game in charge, as well as, his own injury concern. He made 19 appearances for Bayern's first team at the end of the 2010–11 season.

It was announced on 3 May 2011 that Kraft would leave the club at the end of the 2010–11 season, ending his seven years association with them. He previously hinted of his departure at FC Bayern Munich. The following week, 2. Bundesliga champions Hertha BSC announced that they had signed a four-year deal with Kraft on a free transfer and will join the club on 1 July 2011.

=== Hertha BSC ===
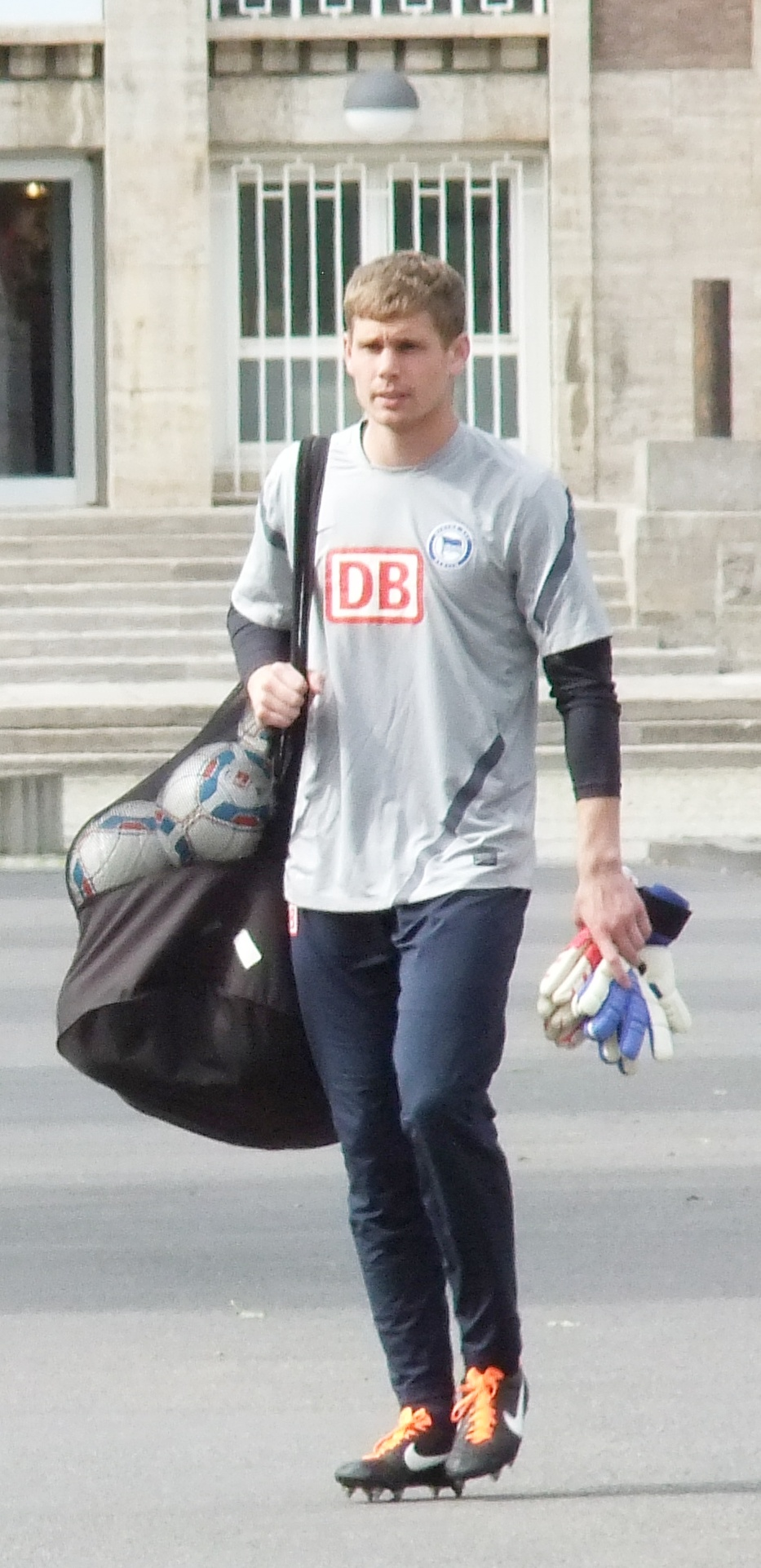
Kraft making his way to the training ground during his time at Hertha BSC in 2011.

Ahead of the 2011–12 season, he found himself competing with Maikel Aerts and Sascha Burchert over Hertha BSC's first choice goalkeeper role. However, he suffered ankle injury that saw him miss the DFB-Pokal's first round match against ZFC Meuselwitz. But Kraft was able return from injury and made his debut for the club in the opening game of the season against Nürnberg, as they lost 1–0. Since making his debut for Hertha BSC, he quickly became a first choice goalkeeper for the club, beating out Aerts and Burchert. On 16 October 2011, Kraft returned for the first time with Hertha back to his old club Bayern Munich which turned out to be a quite bitter reunion for Kraft; the Berlin club lost 0–4. Prior to the game, Kraft and two other members of Hertha (Christian Lell and Andreas Ottl) were honored with a bouquet of flowers by the Bayern staff and the fans were chanting pro Kraft throughout the game. Two weeks later against Wolfsburg on 29 October 2011, however, he suffered a concussion following a collision with Mario Mandžukić and was substituted in the 38th minute, as the club won 3–2. After the match, Kraft was given all clear and returned to the starting line–up against Borussia Mönchengladbach on 5 November 2011, as Hertha BSC lost 2–1. Having regained his place as the club's first choice goalkeeper, Hertha BSC's results did not go in their favour and found themselves in a relegation zone, resulting in them finishing sixteenth place in the league. He played in both legs of the relegation play–offs against Fortuna Düsseldorf, as the club lost 4–2 on aggregate, resulting in them relegated. Following Hertha BSC's relegation, Kraft, along with his four teammates, were involved in an incident with referee Wolfgang Stark, resulting in an investigation by the German Football Association. Although the players and Kraft, himself, apologised for their actions, the German Football Association (DFB) handed down suspensions and gave him a five match suspension. At the end of the 2011–12 season, he went on to make thirty–eight appearances in all competitions.

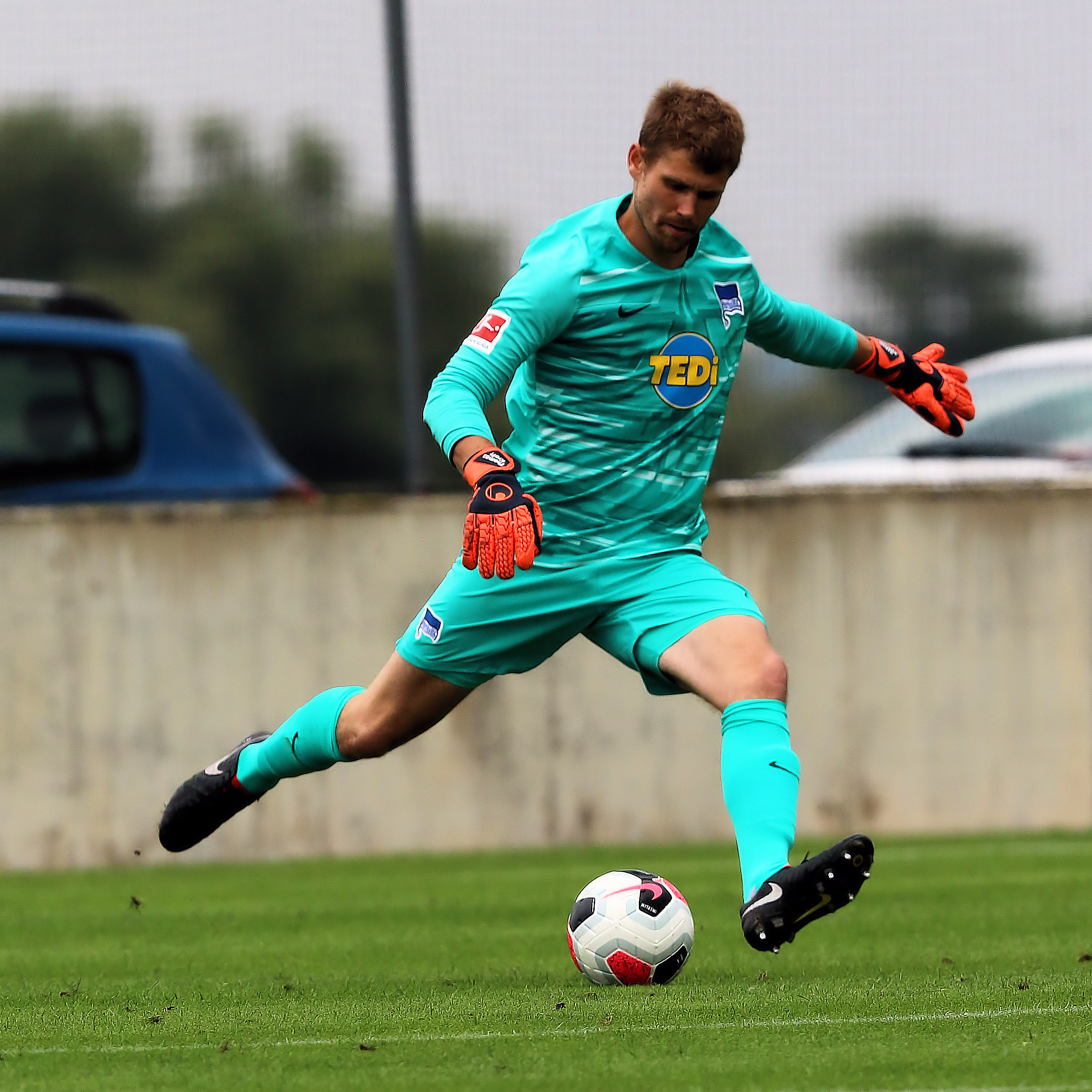
Kraft preparing to take a goal kick during a friendly match between Hertha BSC and West Ham United in 2019.

Ahead of the 2012–13 season, Kraft made it clear that he wanted to stay at Hertha BSC, even if the club were relegated to 2. Bundesliga. Kraft stated his aim was to help Hertha BSC get promoted back to Bundesliga. Having served a five match suspension, he returned to the starting line–up against VfR Aalen on 16 September 2012 and kept a clean sheet, as the club won 2–0,his first clean sheet for the club. Since returning to the starting line–up, Kraft regained his place as Hertha BSC's first choice goalkeeper for the club and contributed into helping them reach the top of the table. This lasted until he missed one match for Hertha BSC against MSV Duisburg on 10 March 2013, due to illness. Kraft returned to the starting line–up against 1860 Munich on 16 March 2013 and kept a clean, as the club drew 0–0. This was followed up by keeping two more clean sheets against VfL Bochum and Eintracht Braunschweig. He then helped Hertha BSC achieve direct promotion to the top-flight Bundesliga for the 2013–14 season by beating SV Sandhausen 1–0 on 21 April 2013. At the end of the 2012–13 season, Kraft went on to make twenty–eight appearances in all competitions. For his performance, he was awarded "The White Vest".

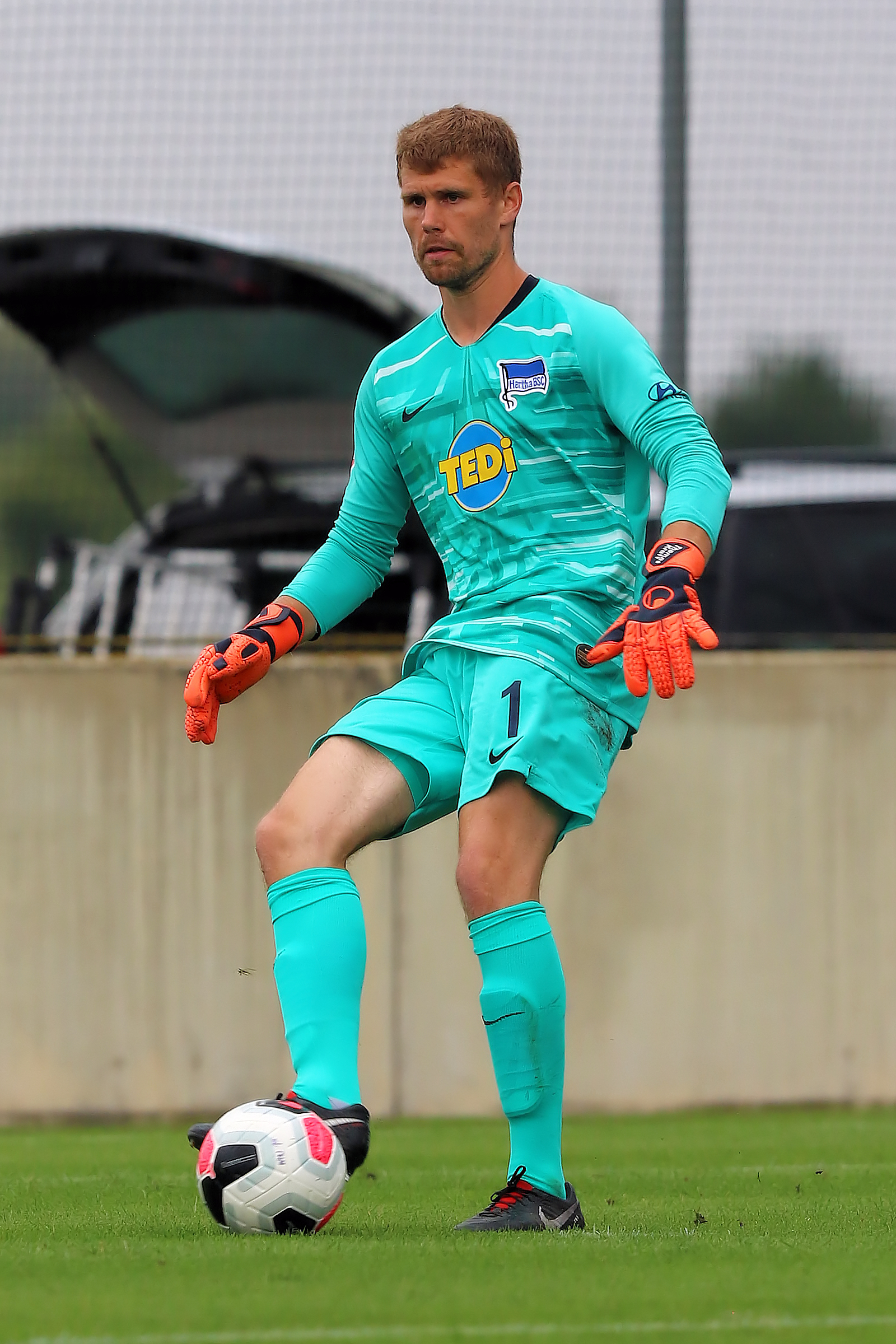
Kraft preparing to pass during a friendly match between Hertha BSC and West Ham United in 2019.

In the opening game of the 2013–14 season, Kraft made an impressive start for Hertha BSC when he helped the side beat Eintracht Frankfurt 6–1. Since the start of the 2013–14 season, Kraft continued to regain his first team place as the club's first choice goalkeeper. He also began talks with Hertha BSC over a new contract extension despite having two–year left to his contract. However, his performance soon faulted when Kraft made a number of errors, including one against his former club, Bayern Munich on 26 October 2013. After the match, Jos Luhukay defended his performance and responded to calls to drop Kraft as the club's first choice goalkeeper by disagreeing with his critics and maintain on using him. Kraft was able to redeem himself after displaying good performance in a 3–2 win against Hoffenheim on 9 November 2013. He then kept two consecutive clean sheets between 30 November 2013 and 8 December 2013 Augsburg and Eintracht Braunschweig. Kraft, once again, kept another two consecutive clean sheets between 19 April 2014 and 26 April 2014 against Augsburg and Eintracht Braunschweig. He made his 100th appearance for Hertha BSC in the last game of the season against Borussia Dortmund, as the club lost 4–0. Despite being absence on two occasions during the 2013–14 season, Kraft went on to make thirty–four appearances in all competitions. Reflecting on the season, he said the mistakes made him a better person.

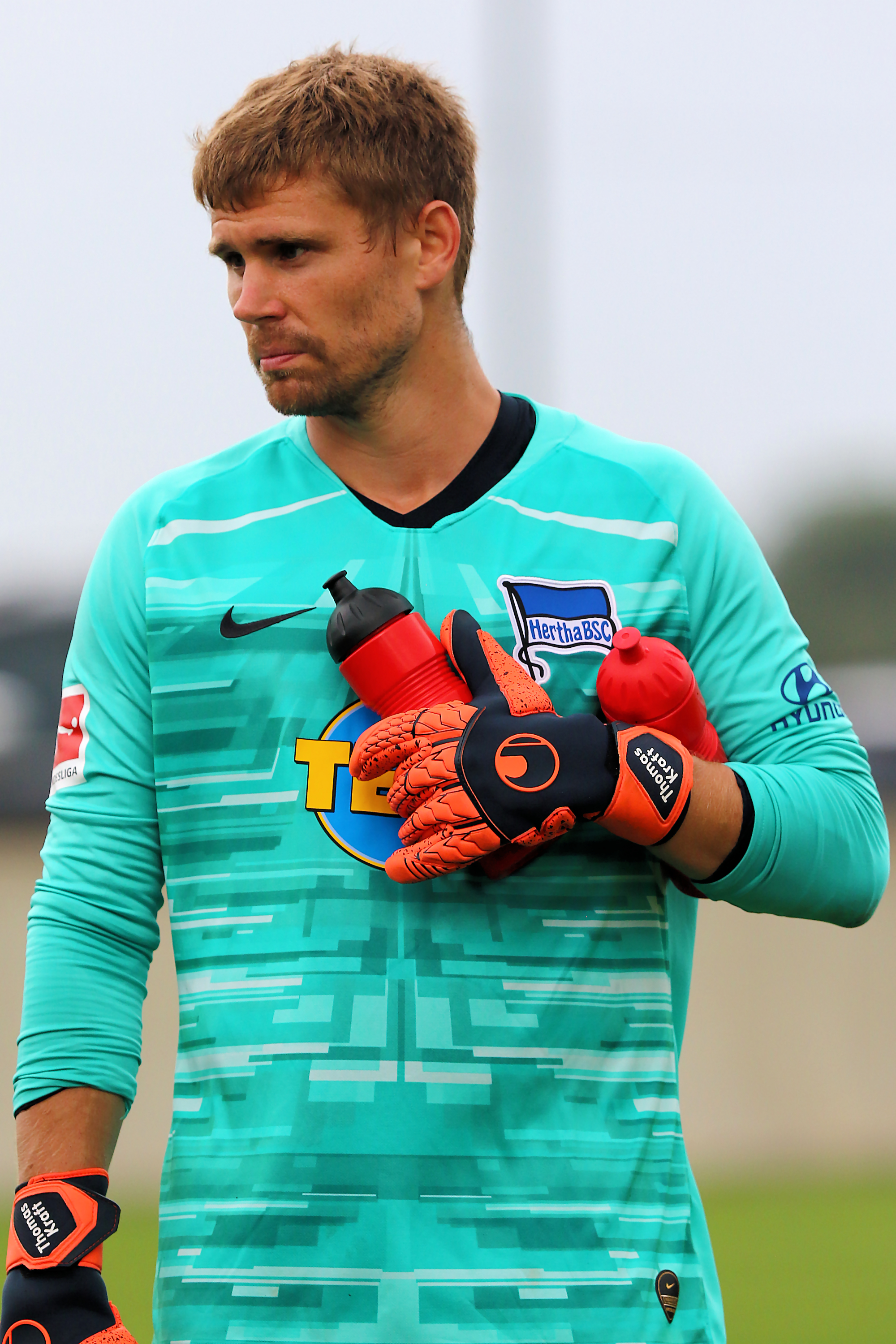
Kraft pictured in a post-match between Hertha BSC and West Ham United in 2019.

At the start of the 2014–15 season, Kraft started in the first two matches of the season before suffering a calf injury that saw him miss one match. But he returned to the starting line–up against Mainz 05 on 9 September 2014, as the club lost 3–1. Since returning from a calf injury, Kraft regained his place as Hertha BSC's first choice goalkeeper. It was announced on 22 December 2014 that he signed a contract extension with the club, keeping him until 2017. Two months later on 15 February 2015, Kraft was given Hertha BSC's captaincy for the first time, starting the whole game, in a 2–0 loss against SC Freiburg. He then helped the club keep two consecutive clean sheets; with the first one occurred between 28 February 2015 and 6 March 2015 and the second occurred between 20 March 2015 and 5 April 2015. However, Hertha BSC found themselves battling in the relegation zone and ultimately avoided relegation by finishing sixteenth place. Despite facing further setbacks with injuries later in the 2014–15 season, Kraft went on to make thirty–four appearances in all competitions.

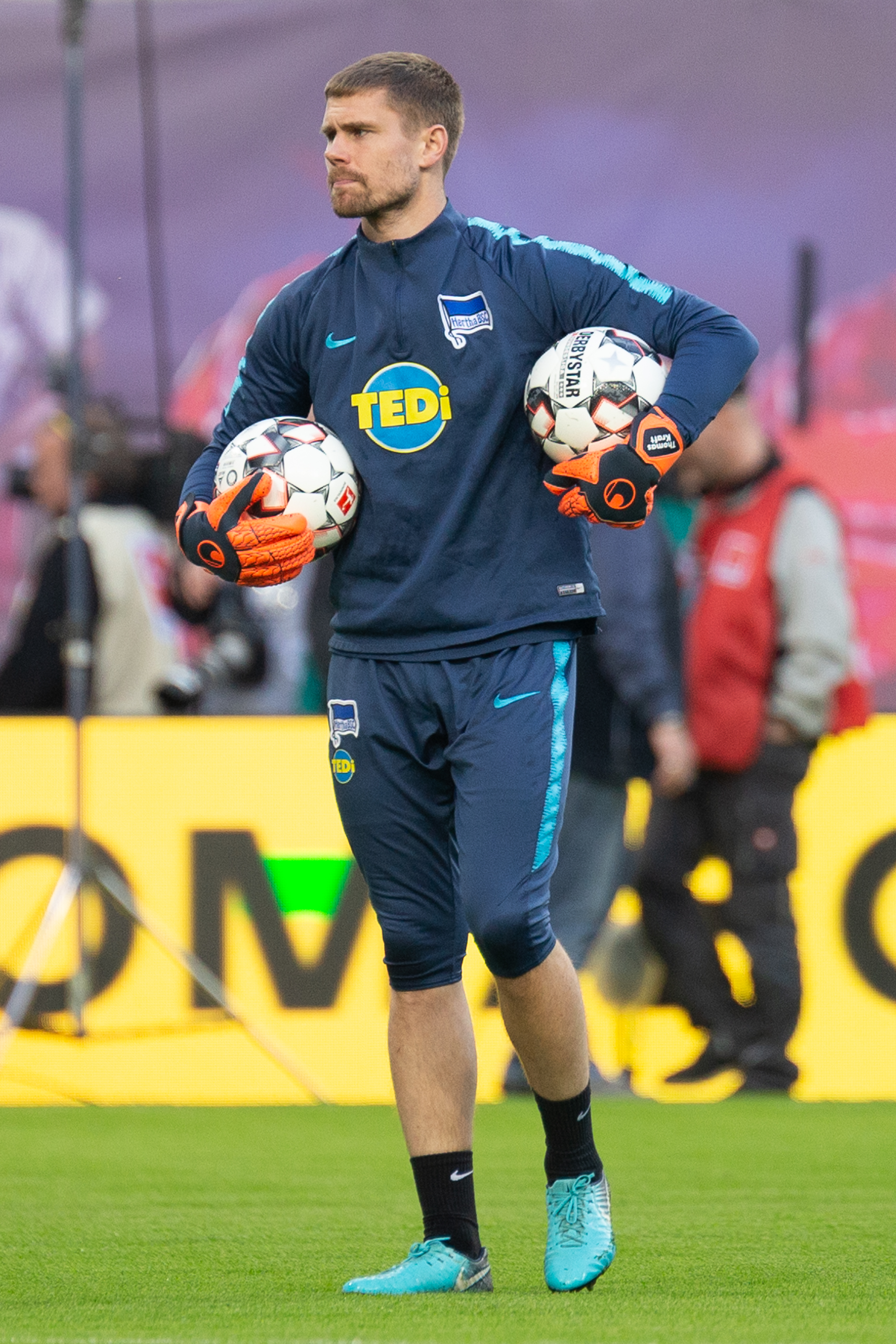
Kraft pictured training for Hertha BSC prior to a match against RB Leipzig on 30 March 2019.

Kraft started in the first five matches of the 2015–16 season, helping Hertha BSC earn seven points. His performance was praised by his manager and teammates, calling him the best player on the pitch. However, during a 2–0 loss against Wolfsburg on 19 September 2015, he suffered a shoulder injury and was substituted at half time. After the match, it was announced that Kraft was out for four months. By February, he recovered from a shoulder injury full time and returned to the substitute bench for the next two months. Despite suffering two separate injuries, Kraft made one appearances for the club, starting the whole game, in a 2–0 loss against Bayern Munich on 23 April 2016. At the end of the 2015–16 season, he went on to make seven appearances in all competitions.

Kraft made his only appearance of the 2016–17 season, coming against Brøndby in the second leg of the UEFA Europa League Third Round, as Hertha BSC lost 3–2, resulting in the club's elimination. However, he remained as Hertha BSC's second choice goalkeeper, with Rune Jarstein being preferred instead. Along the way, Kraft was sidelined on two occasions throughout the 2016–17 season. Despite this, he signed a contract with the club, keeping him until 2019. On 20 August 2017, Kraft made his first appearance of the 2017–18 season, starting the whole game, as Hertha BSC's reserve team won 1–0 against Wacker 90 Nordhausen in the first round of the DFB–Pokal. A month later on 20 September 2017, he made his first team appearance of the season (and his UEFA Europa League debut), starting the whole game, and kept a clean sheet, in a 0–0 draw against Athletic Bilbao. Kraft then went on to make three more UEFA Europa League matches for the club, as they were eliminated from the group stage. Following the absence of Jarstein, Kraft made his return to the league starting line–up for the first time in two years for Hertha BSC against Borussia Dortmund on 20 January 2018, as the club drew 1–1. He then started in the next two matches for Hertha BSC, coming against Werder Bremen and Hoffenheim. Throughout the 2017–18 season, Kraft remained as the club's second choice goalkeeper behind Jarstein. Despite this, he went on to make eight appearances in all competitions for Hertha BSC.

At the start of the 2018–19 season, however, Kraft suffered a knee injury that saw him miss one match. But he made his first appearance for Hertha BSC, coming on as a second-half substitute for Jarstein, as the club lost 3–1 against Werder Bremen on 25 September 2018. Kraft later made two appearances for the club by the end of the year. Throughout the 2018–19 season, Kraft, once again, remained as the club's second choice goalkeeper behind Jarstein, as well as, facing his own injury concern. It was announced on 17 April 2019 when he signed a one–year contract extension with Hertha BSC. Following the injury of Jarstein once again, Kraft was featured in the last two remaining matches of the 2018–19 season. At the end of the 2018–19 season, he went on to make five appearances in all competitions.

At the start of the 2019–20 season, Kraft, once again, remained as the club's second choice goalkeeper behind Jarstein. On 30 October 2019, he made his first appearance of the season against Dynamo Dresden in the second round of the DFB–Pokal, and helped Hertha BSC win 5–4 in a penalty shootout following a 3–3 draw. After the match, Manager Ante Čović praised his performance. After Jarstein was suspended for two matches, Kraft started in goal for two matches between 30 November 2019 and 6 December 2019 against Borussia Dortmund and Eintracht Frankfurt. After Jarstein was dropped to the substitute bench, he returned to the starting line–up against Fortuna Düsseldorf on 28 February 2020, as the club drew 3–3. Kraft made another appearance for Hertha BSC in a follow–up match against Werder Bremen, as the club drew 2–2. This lasted until the season was interrupted due to the coronavirus pandemic. However, throughout the 2019–20 season, Kraft was plagued with injuries, including a back problems that saw him sidelined for the rest of the season. At the end of the 2019–20 season, he went on to make five appearances in all competitions.

On 25 June 2020, Hertha BSC announced the departure of Thomas Kraft, along with Salomon Kalou and four other players. Kraft announced his retirement shortly after, citing health problems.

== International career ==
Kraft made one appearance each for Germany U16, coming against Belgium U16 on 26 May 2004. In an interview with Berliner Morgenpost, Kraft hoped he would earn a call up from the senior team one day, but it never happened.

== Personal life ==
When asked about his career path in an interview with Merkur, Kraft said: "I don't play football just to be second or third goalkeeper somewhere - and I don't want to get lost in the second or third division either. I want to become number 1 in a Bundesliga club as soon as possible. This year I want to show myself even more - maybe I can offer myself here for the next few years." He also idolised Oliver Kahn and his own father, saying: "When I was little he was having his really big time. You take a special look there. But in principle that stopped later, then you look in general at all goalkeepers to see where you can get something. There is no longer one big role model to look up to or something."

Kraft revealed that his father's death when he was fifteen made him more responsible at an "early young age". Kraft is married to wife Denise and they lived together with their two dogs. In March 2014, Kraft became a first time father when Denise gave birth to a baby boy, Mateo and this resulted in him missing a match against Schalke 04 on 28 March 2014. After returning to the first team in a 1–1 draw against Hoffenheim on 6 April 2014, he dedicated his performance to his son.

Outside of football, Kraft is a supporter of Christian Democratic Union of Germany. He also have a passion of cars and enjoys watching Formula 1.

== Career statistics ==
Appearances and goals by club, season and competition
Club	Season	League			DFB-Pokal		Europe		Other^{1}		Total		Ref.
Club	Season	League	Apps	Goals	Apps	Goals	Apps	Goals	Apps	Goals	Apps	Goals	Ref.
Bayern Munich II	2006–07	Regionalliga Süd	13	0	—		—		—		13	0	
Bayern Munich II	2007–08	Regionalliga Süd	33	0	—		—		—		33	0	
Bayern Munich II	2008–09	3. Liga	24	0	—		—		—		24	0	
Bayern Munich II	2009–10	3. Liga	27	0	—		—		—		27	0	
Bayern Munich II	2010–11	3. Liga	6	0	—		—		—		6	0	
Bayern Munich II	Total		103	0	—		—		—		103	0	—
Bayern Munich	2007–08	Bundesliga	0	0	0	0	0	0	—		0	0	
Bayern Munich	2008–09	Bundesliga	0	0	0	0	0	0	—		0	0	
Bayern Munich	2009–10	Bundesliga	0	0	0	0	0	0	—		0	0	
Bayern Munich	2010–11	Bundesliga	12	0	2	0	4	0	1	0	19	0	
Bayern Munich	Total		12	0	2	0	4	0	1	0	19	0	—
Hertha BSC	2011–12	Bundesliga	34	0	2	0	—		2	0	38	0	
Hertha BSC	2012–13	2. Bundesliga	28	0	0	0	—		—		28	0	
Hertha BSC	2013–14	Bundesliga	32	0	2	0	—		—		34	0	
Hertha BSC	2014–15	Bundesliga	32	0	2	0	—		—		34	0	
Hertha BSC	2015–16	Bundesliga	6	0	1	0	—		—		7	0	
Hertha BSC	2016–17	Bundesliga	0	0	0	0	1	0	—		1	0	
Hertha BSC	2017–18	Bundesliga	3	0	0	0	4	0	—		7	0	
Hertha BSC	2018–19	Bundesliga	4	0	1	0	—		—		5	0	
Hertha BSC	2019–20	Bundesliga	4	0	1	0	—		—		5	0	
Hertha BSC	Total		143	0	9	0	5	0	2	0	159	0	—
Hertha BSC II	2017–18	Regionalliga Nordost	1	0	—		—		—		1	0	
Hertha BSC II	2019–20	Regionalliga Nordost	1	0	—		—		—		1	0	
Hertha BSC II	Total		2	0	—		—		—		2	0	—
Career total			260	0	11	0	9	0	3	0	283	0	—

- 1.Includes German Super Cup and Bundesliga relegation playoff.

== Honours ==
=== Club ===
Bayern Munich

- Bundesliga: 2009–10
- DFB-Pokal: 2010
- DFL-Supercup: 2010
- UEFA Champions League runner-up: 2010

Hertha BSC

- 2. Bundesliga: 2012–13
