= 2010–11 FC Bayern Munich season =

111th season in existence of Bayern Munich

Bayern Munich
2010–11 season
- President: Uli Hoeneß
- Head coach: Louis van Gaal (until 10 April); Andries Jonker (caretaker; from 10 April)
- Stadium: Allianz Arena
- Bundesliga: 3rd
- DFB-Pokal: Semi-finals
- DFL-Supercup: Winners
- UEFA Champions League: Round of 16
- Top goalscorer: League: Mario Gómez (28); All: Mario Gómez (39)
- Highest home attendance: 69,000
- Lowest home attendance: 69,000
Home colours	Away colours	Third colours

The 2010–11 season of FC Bayern Munich began on 21 June with their first training session.

== Off-season ==
Bayern already made a few squad changes. They released the previously loaned out Luca Toni from his contract and sold Christian Lell to Hertha BSC. The contracts of multiple players expired and were not extended: Michael Rensing eventually ended up at 1. FC Köln, while Andreas Görlitz joined FC Ingolstadt. Meanwhile, José Sosa was sold to Napoli.

Breno and Andreas Ottl both returned from 1. FC Nürnberg, where they had been on loan since the winter break; Toni Kroos came back from an 18-month loan to Leverkusen; and Edson Braafheid returned from a six-month spell at Celtic. Save for Rouven Sattelmaier, Bayern opted in the end to make no new signings in the summer transfer window ending at 31 August.

== Pre-season ==
Head coach Louis van Gaal divided the pre-season into two phases, as many of his players participated in the World Cup and were only later available for the club. The initial phase began with the first training on 21 June. In this phase, which lasted until 4 July, the first squad trained with the second team and a friendly at the fanclub "Lohner Bayern Union" was held. On 30 June, the club announced that 18-year-old David Alaba had signed his first professional contract at Bayern.

The second phase began on 15 July. As 13 players participated in the 2010 World Cup, Van Gaal had only 11 first teamers at his disposal. His training squad was thus complemented with the second team. Franck Ribéry and Martín Demichelis were the first players from World Cup squads that resumed training, but only after the training camp in Riva del Garda from 19 to 24 July. The remaining nine players from the German and Dutch squads returned on 2 August. While Van Gaal was proud to have the most players of any club in the final games of the World Cup, he lamented that "this is not a good pre-season." But he was even more displeased with the FIFA scheduling an international matchday on 11 August, in between the Super Cup and the first round of the DFB-Pokal. The coach actually advised his players to ask the German Football Association (DFB) to be excused for the game: "If eight Bayern players said they'd withdraw, the DFB would listen, I believe." The warning ended in a healthy compromise, where most of the players with substantial playing time at the World Cup were not picked by German coach Joachim Löw. For Bayern, this meant losing only Toni Kroos and Mario Gómez to the international date. The pre-season ended on 16 August with the first round of the DFB-Pokal, where Bayern played Germania Windeck and advanced to the second round.

There was unfortunate news at the return of the last internationals for Bayern, after medical tests confirmed that Arjen Robben's sustained injury in a pre-World cup friendly had not properly healed and that he would be out for a further two months. Bayern Chairman Karl-Heinz Rummenigge stated, "Of course, Bayern Munich are very angry" with the Royal Dutch Football Association (KNVB), and would be seeking compensation from them, continuing, "Once again we must pay the bill as a club after a player is seriously injured playing for a national team." At the end of August, new tests showed slower than anticipated healing in Robben's muscle, leading to fears that Robben might not play again before 2011.

== Season ==
Bayern were involved during the winter transfer, with Bayern adding Luiz Gustavo from 1899 Hoffenheim and David Alaba moving the other way in a loan deal. Martín Demichelis was sold to Málaga and one week before the end of the winter transfer period, captain Mark van Bommel requested to be released from his contract and moved to Milan. Edson Braafheid also signed for 1899 Hoffenheim on a permanent basis, while Maximilian Haas also left the club, signing for English team Middlesbrough on the last day of the winter transfer window.

== Competitions ==
=== Bundesliga ===
The Bundesliga campaign began on 20 August when Bayern played in the opening game of the season against VfL Wolfsburg.

==== League table ====
Pos	Team	Pld	W	D	L	GF	GA	GD	Pts	Qualification or relegation
1	Borussia Dortmund (C)	34	23	6	5	67	22	+45	75	Qualification to Champions League group stage
2	Bayer Leverkusen	34	20	8	6	64	44	+20	68	Qualification to Champions League group stage
3	Bayern Munich	34	19	8	7	81	40	+41	65	Qualification to Champions League play-off round
4	Hannover 96	34	19	3	12	49	45	+4	60	Qualification to Europa League play-off round
5	FSV Mainz 05	34	18	4	12	52	39	+13	58	Qualification to Europa League third qualifying round

Source: kicker
Rules for classification: 1) points; 2) goal difference; 3) number of goals scored.
(C) Champions

Match	Date	Ground	Opponent	Score^{1}	Pos.	Pts.	GD	Report
1	20 August	H	VfL Wolfsburg	2 – 1	6	3	1	Report / Report link; Kick off / 20:30 CEST; Attendance / 69,000 (capacity); Referee / Thorsten Kinhöfer (Herne); Bayern Munich / VfL Wolfsburg; Müller 9'; Schweinsteiger 90'; Van Bommel (yellow card) 33' / Džeko 58'; Pekarík (yellow card) 43'; Cícero (yellow card) 62'; Barzagli (yellow card) 66'
2	28 August	A	1. FC Kaiserslautern	0 – 2	12	3	-1	Report / Report link; Kick off / 20:30 CEST; Attendance / 49,780; Referee / Florian Meyer; 1. FC Kaiserslautern / Bayern Munich; Iličević 36', (yellow card) 39' (yellow-red card) 90+1'; Lakić 37' / Müller (yellow card) 85'
3	11 September	H	Werder Bremen	0 – 0	11	4	-1	Report / Report link; Kick off / 18:30 CEST; Attendance / 69,000 (capacity); Referee / Knut Kircher
4	18 September	H	1. FC Köln	0 – 0	9	5	-1	Report / Report link; Kick off / 15:30 CEST; Attendance / 69,000 (capacity); Referee / Felix Zwayer; Bayern Munich / 1. FC Köln; / Brečko (yellow card) 63'
5	21 September	A	1899 Hoffenheim	2 – 1	8	8	0	Report / Report link; Kick off / 20:00 CEST; Attendance / 30,150; Referee / Thorsten Kinhöfer; 1899 Hoffenheim / Bayern Munich; Ibišević 1'; Weis (yellow card) 31' / Müller 63'; Altıntop (yellow card) 85'; Van Bommel (yellow card) 89'; Van Buyten 90+1'
6	25 September	H	Mainz 05	1 – 2	9	8	-1	Report / Report link; Kick off / 15:30 CEST; Attendance / 69,000 (capacity); Referee / Babak Rafati; Bayern Munich / Mainz 05; Svensson 45' (o.g.) / Allagui 15'; Fuchs (yellow card) 31'; Svensson (yellow card) 37'; Szalai 77'
7	3 October	A	Borussia Dortmund	0 – 2	12	8	-3	Report / Report link; Kick off / 15:30 CEST; Attendance / 80,720; Referee / Florian Meyer; Borussia Dortmund / Bayern Munich; Barrios 52'; Şahin 60' / Demichelis (yellow card) 67'; Olić (yellow card) 80'; Schweinsteiger (yellow card) 83'
8	16 October	H	Hannover 96	3 – 0	10	11	0	Report / Report link; Kick off / 15:30 CEST; Attendance / 69,000 (capacity); Referee / Marco Fritz; Bayern Munich / Hannover 96; Gómez 21', 77', 90' (yellow card) 78'; Badstuber (yellow card) 88'; Tymoshchuk (yellow card) 90+2' / Ya Konan (yellow card) 88'
9	22 October	A	Hamburger SV	0 – 0	11	12	0	Report / Report link; Kick off / 20:30 CEST; Attendance / 57,000; Referee / Manuel Gräfe; Hamburger SV / Bayern Munich; Mathijsen (yellow card) 23' / Pranjić (yellow card) 27'; Schweinsteiger (yellow card) 45+2'
10	30 October	H	SC Freiburg	4 – 2	7	15	2	Report / Report link; Kick off / 20:30 CEST; Attendance / 69,000 (capacity); Referee / Peter Gagelmann; Bayern Munich / SC Freiburg; Demichelis 39'; Gómez 61'; Tymoshchuk 72'; Kroos 80' / Reisinger 64'; Braafheid 87' (o.g.); Putsilo (yellow card) 52'; Cissé (yellow card) 74'; Toprak (yellow card) 79'
11	6 November	A	Borussia Mönchengladbach	3 – 3	9	16	2	Report / Report link; Kick off / 15:30 CET; Attendance / 54,057 (capacity); Referee / Knut Kircher; Borussia Mönchengladbach / Bayern Munich; Herrmann 5'; Reus 56'; De Camargo 60'; Schachten (yellow card) 42' / Gómez 11'; Schweinsteiger 40' (penalty missed) 43'; Lahm 84'
12	14 November	H	1. FC Nürnberg	3 – 0	6	19	5	Report / Report link; Kick off / 17:30 CET; Attendance / 69,000 (capacity); Referee / Thorsten Kinhöfer; Bayern Munich / 1. FC Nürnberg; Gómez 10', 75' (penalty missed) 87'; Lahm 57' (pen.); Pranjić (yellow card) 73' / Schäfer (yellow card) 57'
13	20 November	A	Bayer Leverkusen	1 – 1	8	20	5	Report / Report link; Kick off / 17:30 CET; Attendance / 30,210; Referee / Florian Meyer; Bayer Leverkusen / Bayern Munich; Vidal 45+2' (pen.); Castro (yellow card) 66'; Friedrich (yellow card) 73' / Gómez 34'; Lahm (yellow card) 59'; Ríbery (yellow card) 86'
14	27 November	H	Eintracht Frankfurt	4 – 1	5	23	8	Report / Report link; Kick off / 17:30 CET; Attendance / 69,000 (capacity); Referee / Felix Zwayer; Bayern Munich / Eintracht Frankfurt; Ríbery (yellow card) 2'; Tymoshchuk 29', 88'; Müller 59'; Gómez 61' / Gekas 33'
15	4 December	A	Schalke 04	0 – 2	7	23	6	Report / Report link; Kick off / 18:30 CET; Attendance / 61,673; Referee / Peter Gagelmann; Schalke 04 / Bayern Munich; Jurado 58'; Höwedes 67' / Kroos (yellow card) 45'
16	11 December	H	FC St. Pauli	3 – 0	6	26	9	Report / Report link; Kick off / 16:30 CET; Attendance / 69,000 (capacity); Referee / Babak Rafati (Hanover); Bayern Munich / FC St. Pauli; Altıntop 17'; Lahm 71' (pen.); Ribéry 79' / Kessler (red card) 68'; Iličević (yellow card) 45'
17	19 December	A	VfB Stuttgart	5 – 3	5	29	11	Report / Report link; Kick off / 17:30 CET; Attendance / 40,500; Referee / Thorsten Kinhöfer; VfB Stuttgart / Bayern Munich; Harnik 50', 64'; Gentner 71' / Gómez 31', 52', 54'; Müller 36'; Ribéry 43'
18	15 January	A	VfL Wolfsburg	1 – 1	5	30	11	Report / Report link; Kick off / 15:30 CET; Attendance / 30,000 (capacity); Referee / Manuel Gräfe (Berlin); VfL Wolfsburg / Bayern Munich; Mandžukić (yellow card) 2'; Grafite (penalty missed) 45+3'; Riether 86'; Josué (yellow card) 56' / Müller 7'; Lahm (penalty missed) 21'; Schweinsteiger (yellow card) 45'; Badstuber (yellow card) 49'
19	22 January	H	1. FC Kaiserslautern	5 – 1	4	33	15	Report / Report link; Kick off / 15:30 CET; Attendance / 69,000 (capacity); Referee / Markus Schmidt (Stuttgart); Bayern Munich / 1. FC Kaiserslautern; Robben 45'; Gómez 52', 80', 85'; Müller 90' / Morávek 62'; Kirch (yellow card) 65'; Tiffert (yellow card) 70'; Bugera (yellow card) 73'
20	29 January	A	Werder Bremen	3 – 1	3	36	17	Report / Report link; Kick off / 15:30 CET; Attendance / 40,500 (capacity); Referee / Thorsten Kinhöfer (Herne); Werder Bremen / Bayern Munich; Mertesacker 47'; Pizarro (yellow card) 35'; Prödl (yellow card) 36'; Wiese (red card) 88' / Robben 65', (yellow card) 85'; Mertesacker 76' (o.g.); Klose 87'; Schweinsteiger (yellow card) 25'
21	5 February	A	1. FC Köln	2 – 3	5	36	16	Report / Report link; Kick off / 15:30 CET; Attendance / 50,000 (capacity); Referee / Felix Zwayer (Berlin); 1. FC Köln / Bayern Munich; Clemens 55'; Novaković 62', 73' / Badstuber (yellow card) 19'; Gómez 22'; Altıntop 43'; Lahm (yellow card) 48'
22	12 February	H	1899 Hoffenheim	4 – 0	3	39	20	Report / Report link; Kick off / 15:30 CET; Attendance / 69,000 (capacity); Referee / Peter Gagelmann (Bremen); Bayern Munich / 1899 Hoffenheim; Gómez 2'; Müller 15'; Robben 63', 81' / Weis (yellow card) 38'; Šimunić (yellow card) 55'; Beck (yellow card) 58'; Salihović (yellow card) 82'
23	19 February	A	Mainz 05	3 – 1	3	42	22	Report / Report link; Kick off / 18:30 CET; Attendance / 20,300 (capacity); Referee / Knut Kircher (Rottenburg); Mainz 05 / Bayern Munich; Fuchs (yellow card) 16'; Holtby (yellow card) 58'; Allagui 83' / Schweinsteiger 6'; Badstuber (yellow card) 30'; Müller 50'; Gómez 77'
24	26 February	H	Borussia Dortmund	1 – 3	4	42	20	Report / Report link; Kick off / 18:30 CET; Attendance / 69,000 (capacity); Referee / Manuel Gräfe (Berlin); Bayern Munich / Borussia Dortmund; Luiz Gustavo 16'; Robben (yellow card) 76'; Schweinsteiger (yellow card) 86' / Barrios 9'; Şahin 18' (yellow card) 53'; Lewandowski (yellow card) 39'; Schmelzer (yellow card) 42'; Hummels 60'
25	5 March	A	Hannover 96	1 – 3	5	42	18	Report / Report link; Kick off / 15:30 CET; Attendance / 49,000 (capacity); Referee / Jochen Drees (Münster-Sarmsheim); Hannover 96 / Bayern Munich; Abdellaoue 16', (yellow card) 60'; Rausch 51'; Pinto 62', (yellow card) 80'; Stindl (yellow card) 73' / Kroos (yellow card) 42'; Robben 55'; Breno (red card) 73'
26	12 March	H	Hamburger SV	6 – 0	4	45	24	Report / Report link; Kick off / 15:30 CET; Attendance / 69,000 (capacity); Referee / Michael Weiner (Giesen); Bayern Munich / Hamburger SV; Robben 40', 47', 55'; Ribéry 64' (yellow card) 65'; Müller 79'; Klose (yellow card) 83'; Westermann 85' (o.g.) / Guerrero (yellow card) 65'
27	19 March	A	SC Freiburg	2 – 1	4	48	25	Report / Report link; Kick off / 15:30 CET; Attendance / 24,000; Referee / Peter Gagelmann (Bremen); SC Freiburg / Bayern Munich; Cissé (penalty missed) 14' 17'; Schuster (yellow card) 30'; Reisinger (yellow card) 87' / Gómez 9'; Ribéry 88'
28	2 April	H	Borussia Mönchengladbach	1 – 0	3	51	26	Report / Report link; Kick off / 15:30 CEST; Attendance / 69,000 (capacity); Referee / Christian Dingert (Lebecksmühle); Bayern Munich / Borussia Mönchengladbach; Lahm (yellow card) 32'; Robben 78', (yellow card) 84' / Reus (yellow card) 67'
29	9 April	A	1. FC Nürnberg	1 – 1	4	52	26	Report / Report link; Kick off / 15:30 CEST; Attendance / 48,548; Referee / Christian Dingert (Lebecksmühle); 1. FC Nürnberg / Bayern Munich; Wolf (yellow card) 16'; Wollscheid (yellow card) 58'; Eigler 60' / Müller 5'; Kroos (yellow card) 33'; Badstuber (yellow card) 55'; Robben (red card) 90+3'; Robben was sent off after the final whistle
30	16 April	H	Bayer Leverkusen	5 – 1	3	55	30	Report / Report link; Kick off / 15:30 CEST; Attendance / 69,000 (capacity); Referee / Manuel Gräfe; Bayern Munich / Bayer Leverkusen; Rolfes 7' (o.g.); Gómez 29', 44', 45+1'; Tymoshchuk (yellow card) 54'; Ribéry 75' / Derdiyok 62'; Vidal (yellow card) 77'
31	23 April	A	Eintracht Frankfurt	1 – 1	4	56	30	Report / Report link; Kick off / 15:30 CEST; Attendance / 47,000 (capacity); Referee / Jochen Drees; Eintracht Frankfurt / Bayern Munich; Köhler (yellow card) 29'; Rode 54'; Ochs (yellow card) 65'; Jung (yellow card) 72'; Fenin (yellow card) 88' / Schweinsteiger (yellow card) 65'; Contento (yellow card) 66'; Gómez (yellow card) 66', (goal) 89' (pen.); Luiz Gustavo (yellow card) 90+3'
32	30 April	H	Schalke 04	4 – 1	3	59	33	Report / Report link; Kick off / 18:30 CEST; Attendance / 69,000 (capacity); Referee / Peter Gagelmann (Bremen); Bayern Munich / Schalke 04; Robben 6'; Müller 14', 84'; Gómez 19'; Ribéry (yellow card) 15' / Badstuber 8' (o.g.); Metzelder (yellow card) 12'; Farfán (yellow card) 37'
33	7 May	A	FC St. Pauli	8 – 1	3	62	40	Report / Report link; Kick off / 15:30 CEST; Referee / Thorsten Kinhöfer (Herne); FC St. Pauli / Bayern Munich; Bartels (yellow card) 66'; Eger 78'; Lechner (yellow card) 81'; Bruns (yellow card) 82' / Gómez 10', 52', 86'; Müller (yellow card) 21'; Van Buyten 32'; Robben 54', 84'; Ribéry (yellow card) 66', (goal) 74', 88'
34	14 May	H	VfB Stuttgart	2 – 1	3	65	41	Kick off / 15:30 CEST; Attendance / 69,000 (capacity); Referee / Florian Meyer (Burgdorf); Bayern Munich / VfB Stuttgart; Gómez 37'; Schweinsteiger 71'; Klose (yellow card) 14'; Van Buyten (yellow card) 60' / Okazaki 24'; Boka (yellow card) 39'; Niedermeier (yellow card) 79'

Last updated: 14 May 2011
Source: DFB.de
^{1}Bayern Munich goals come first.
Ground's country's flag and opponent's country's flag shown when from a different country of Bayern Munich.
Pos. = Position in league, Pts. = Points, GD = Goal difference, Ground: H = Home, A = Away, N = Neutral, HR = Home replacement, AR = Away replacement.

=== DFB-Pokal ===
16 August 2010 Round 1	Germania Windeck	0 – 4	Bayern Munich	Cologne
18:00 CEST		report	Klose 44'; Ribéry 45'; Kroos 84'; Gómez 85'	Stadium: RheinEnergieStadion; Attendance: 41,100; Referee: Christian Dingert (Thallichtenberg)

26 October 2010 Round 2	Bayern Munich	2 – 1	Werder Bremen	Munich
20:30 CEST	Schweinsteiger 28', 74'	report	Pizarro 2'	Stadium: Allianz Arena; Attendance: 64,000; Referee: Michael Weiner (Giesen)

22 December 2010 Round 3	Stuttgart	3 – 6	Bayern Munich	Stuttgart
20:30 CET	Pogrebnyak 32', 45+1'; Delpierre 77'		Ottl 6'; Gómez 8'; Klose 52', 86'; Müller 81'; Ribéry 90+4'	Stadium: Mercedes-Benz Arena; Attendance: 40,500; Referee: Florian Meyer (Burgdorf)

26 January 2011 Quarter-finals	Alemannia Aachen	0 – 4	Bayern Munich	Aachen
20:30 CET		report	Gómez 26'; Müller 75', 80'; Robben 88'	Stadium: Tivoli; Attendance: 32,190; Referee: Michael Weiner (Giesen)

2 March 2011 Semi-finals	Bayern Munich	0 – 1	Schalke 04	Munich
20:30 CET		report	Raúl 15'	Stadium: Allianz Arena; Attendance: 69,000; Referee: Florian Meyer (Burgdorf)

=== UEFA Champions League ===
Bayern Munich qualified for the group stage of the 2010–11 UEFA Champions League by winning the Bundesliga in 2009–10. There they were drawn into Group E with Italian runners-up Roma, Swiss double champions Basel and Romanian champions CFR Cluj. Bayern finished the group in first place with a club record of 15 points. In the Round of 16 they were drawn against their opponent from the previous Champions League final, Internazionale.

==== Group stage ====
Pos	Team	Pld	W	D	L	GF	GA	GD	Pts	Qualification	BAY	ROM	BSL	CLJ
1	(Germany) Bayern Munich	6	5	0	1	16	6	+10	15	Advance to knockout phase	—	2–0	3–0	3–2
2	(Italy) Roma	6	3	1	2	10	11	−1	10	Advance to knockout phase	3–2	—	1–3	2–1
3	(Switzerland) Basel	6	2	0	4	8	11	−3	6	Transfer to Europa League	1–2	2–3	—	1–0
4	(Romania) CFR Cluj	6	1	1	4	6	12	−6	4		0–4	1–1	2–1	—

Source: Soccerway

15 September 2010 1	Bayern Munich (Germany)	2 – 0	(Italy) Roma	Munich, Germany
20:45 CEST	Müller 79'; Klose 83'	Report		Stadium: Allianz Arena; Attendance: 66,000; Referee: Stéphane Lannoy (France)

28 September 2010 2	Basel (Switzerland)	1 – 2	(Germany) Bayern Munich	Basel, Switzerland
20:45 CEST	Frei 18'	Report	Schweinsteiger 56' (pen.), 89'	Stadium: St. Jakob-Park; Attendance: 37,500; Referee: Craig Thomson (Scotland)

19 October 2010 3	Bayern Munich (Germany)	3 – 2	(Romania) CFR Cluj	Munich, Germany
20:45 CEST	Cadú 32' (o.g.); Panin 38' (o.g.); Gómez 77'	Report	Cadú 28'; Culio 86'	Stadium: Allianz Arena; Attendance: 64,000; Referee: Martin Atkinson (England)

3 November 2010 4	CFR Cluj (Romania)	0 – 4	(Germany) Bayern Munich	Cluj-Napoca, Romania
20:45 CET		Report	Gómez 12', 24', 71'; Müller 90'	Stadium: Stadionul Dr. Constantin Rădulescu; Attendance: 14,100; Referee: Serge Gumienny (Belgium)

23 November 2010 5	Roma (Italy)	3 – 2	(Germany) Bayern Munich	Rome, Italy
20:45 CET	Borriello 49'; De Rossi 81'; Totti 84' (pen.)	Report	Gómez 33', 39'	Stadium: Stadio Olimpico; Attendance: 42,789; Referee: Alberto Undiano Mallenco (Spain)

8 December 2010 6	Bayern Munich (Germany)	3 – 0	(Switzerland) Basel	Munich, Germany
20:45 CET	Ribéry 35', 50'; Tymoshchuk 37'	Report		Stadium: Allianz Arena; Attendance: 64,000; Referee: Martin Hansson (Sweden)

==== Knockout phase ====
===== Round of 16 =====
23 February 2011 First leg	Internazionale (Italy)	0 – 1	(Germany) Bayern Munich	Milan, Italy
20:45 CET		Report	Gómez 90'	Stadium: San Siro; Attendance: 75,925; Referee: Viktor Kassai (Hungary)

15 March 2011 Second leg	Bayern Munich (Germany)	2 – 3 (3 – 3a agg.)	(Italy) Internazionale	Munich, Germany
20:45 CET	Gómez 21'; Müller 31'	Report	Eto'o 4'; Sneijder 63'; Pandev 88'	Stadium: Allianz Arena; Attendance: 66,000; Referee: Pedro Proença (Portugal)

=== DFL-Supercup ===
Bayern faced Schalke 04 in the first official DFL-Supercup in 14 years. Normally, the league champions would play the cup winners, but as Bayern won both titles, they faced the league's runners-up, Schalke 04.

7 August 2010	Bayern Munich	2 – 0	Schalke 04	Augsburg
	Müller 75'; Klose 81'			Stadium: Impuls Arena; Attendance: 30,660; Referee: Manuel Gräfe

=== Friendlies ===
==== LIGA total! Cup 2010 ====
Bayern played in the 2010 LIGA total! Cup. The tournament was held in the Veltins-Arena and organized by Bayern's prime sponsor, Deutsche Telekom. In this tournament matches consisted of two 30 minutes halves each. The Reds faced Köln in the first game and Schalke 04 in the second game.

31 July 2010	Bayern Munich	0 – 0 (3 – 1 p)	1. FC Köln	Veltins-Arena, Gelsenkirchen
18:35 CEST		(report)		Attendance: 42,000; Referee: Christian Fischer (Hemer)
	Penalties
	Ottl (penalty scored); Tymoshchuk (penalty scored); Olić (penalty scored)		(penalty missed) Lanig; (penalty scored) Yalcin

1 August 2010	Bayern Munich	1 – 3	Schalke 04	Veltins-Arena, Gelsenkirchen
18:35 CEST	Mujić 6'	(report)	Raúl 25', 35'; Edu 27'	Attendance: 38,236; Referee: Thorsten Kinhöfer (Herne)

==== Other friendlies ====
The fanclub "Fanclub Lohner Bayern Union" won the right to host the annual Dream Game, a game Bayern contests against one of its fanclubs with the earnings going to charity.

26 June 2010	Fanclub Lohner Bayern Union	0–12	Bayern Munich	Eintracht-Stadion, Nordhorn
		Report	Knasmüllner 19', 34'; Jüllich 23'; Alaba 28'; Sène 41'; Altıntop 49', 56'; Tymoshchuk 53', 79'; Pranjić 58'; Sosa 59'; Ekici 76'	Attendance: 7,000

On the final day of their training camp in Riva del Garda Bayern faced a selection of players from Trentino in a friendly.

24 July 2010	Trentino XI	1–5	Bayern Munich	Stadio Comunale, Arco, Trentino
	Poli 58'	Report	Sosa 6', 19'; Olić 38', 79'; Ottl 86' (pen.)	Attendance: 2,500

Bayern hosted a team selected by their sponsor, the Fitness First company, on 8 August. The Fitness First Winterstars team consisted of several Winter Olympic Games gold medal winners and four fans. The money raised in the match will be used to support Munich's candidacy for the 2018 Winter Olympics.

8 August 2010	Fitness First Winterstars	1–11	Bayern Munich	Allianz Arena, Munich
14:30 CEST	Czyz 40'	Report	Gómez 11', 14', 19', 35'; Ribéry 17', 23'; Sosa 20', 29', 32'; Kroos 30', 37'	Attendance: 28,000; Referee: Karl Valentin (Taufkirchen)

In the final friendly of the 2010 pre-season, Bayern hosted Real Madrid. The game has been called the Beckenbauer testimonial match as Franz Beckenbauer did not receive a proper farewell game when he left the club in 1977 for New York Cosmos. Incidentally, José Mourinho, the coach who bested Bayern in the previous Champions League final with Internazionale, led Madrid.

13 August 2010	Bayern Munich	0–0 (2 – 4 p)	Real Madrid	Allianz Arena, Munich
20:45 CEST		Report		Attendance: 69,000 (capacity); Referee: Wolfgang Stark (Ergolding)
	Penalties
	Badstuber (penalty scored); Altıntop (penalty missed); Ottl (penalty scored); Braafheid (penalty missed)		(penalty scored) Ronaldo; (penalty scored) Van der Vaart; (penalty scored) Alonso; (penalty scored) Benzema

On 17 November, Bayern arranged a friendly against Unterhaching on short notice with several of the players were away with their national sides. The primary aim was to give previously injured players Franck Ribéry, Breno and Diego Contento some match practice.

17 November 2010	Bayern Munich	2–1	SpVgg Unterhaching	Pitch No1 at Säbener Strasse
	Yılmaz 36'; Knasmüllner 63'	Report	Tunjić 39'	Attendance: 500

Bayern attends three post-season friendlies before the summer break.

15 May 2011	Düren XI	3–4	Bayern Munich	Langerwehe, Düren
16:00 CEST (UTC+02)	Behramy 5'; Kocyigit 65'; Betzer 79'	Report (German)	Tymoshchuk 23', 45'; Badstuber 83'; Gómez 85'	Attendance: 9,000

16 May 2011	Paulaner XI	1–13	Bayern Munich	Wacker Arena, Burghausen
20:15 CEST (UTC+02)	Herbert Grammetbauer 81'	Report	Álvarez 14'; Gómez 20', 28', 45', 78', 88'; Klose 25'; Lahm 31'; Robben 47', 51'; Ribéry 54'; Kroos 65', 67'	Attendance: 9,500; Referee: Karl Valentin (Taufkirchen)

18 May 2011	Zenit Saint Petersburg	2–4	Bayern Munich	Petrovsky Stadium, Saint Petersburg
20:00 MSD (UTC+04)	Bukharov 11'; Huszti 80' (pen.); Alves (yellow card)	Report	Klose 17', 47'; Müller 65'; Robben 81'	Attendance: 18,000; Referee: Nikolai Ivanov

== Players ==
=== Squad information ===
As of 14 May 2011

Squad Season 2010-11
No.	Player	Nat.	Birthday	at FCB since	previous club	BL matches	BL goals	Cup matches	Cup goals	CL matches	CL goals
Goalkeepers
1	Hans-Jörg Butt	(Germany)	28 May 1974	2008	Benfica	22(1)	0	3	0	4	0
22	Rouven Sattelmaier	(Germany)	7 Aug 1987	2010	Jahn Regensburg	0	0	0	0	0	0
35	Thomas Kraft	(Germany)	22 Jul 1988	2004	Junior Team	12	0	2	0	4	0
Defenders
2	Breno	(Brazil)	13 Oct 1989	2008	São Paulo	7(6)	0	2	0	2(1)	0
5	Daniel Van Buyten	(Belgium)	7 Feb 1978	2006	Hamburger SV	18(3)	2	0(3)	0	6	0
21	Philipp Lahm (captain)	(Germany)	11 Nov 1983	1995	Junior Team	34	3	5	0	8	0
26	Diego Contento	(Germany)	1 May 1990	1995	Junior Team	12(2)	0	1	0	2(1)	0
28	Holger Badstuber	(Germany)	13 Mar 1989	2002	Junior Team	21(2)	0	3	0	4(1)	0
Midfielders
7	Franck Ribéry	(France)	7 Apr 1983	2007	Marseille	22(3)	7	3	2	4	2
8	Hamit Altıntop	(Turkey)	8 Dec 1982	2007	Schalke 04	8(6)	2	2(1)	0	4(3)	0
10	Arjen Robben	(Netherlands)	23 Jan 1984	2009	Real Madrid	13(1)	12	1(1)	1	2	0
16	Andreas Ottl	(Germany)	1 Mar 1985	1996	Junior Team	9(6)	0	3	1	3	0
23	Danijel Pranjić	(Croatia)	2 Dec 1981	2009	Heerenveen	22(6)	0	4	0	6(1)	0
30	Luiz Gustavo	(Brazil)	23 Jul 1987	2011	1899 Hoffenheim	14(1)	1	2	0	2	0
31	Bastian Schweinsteiger (vice-captain)	(Germany)	1 Aug 1984	1998	Junior Team	31(1)	4	4	2	8	2
39	Toni Kroos	(Germany)	4 Jan 1990	2006	Junior Team	19(8)	1	2(1)	1	5(1)	0
44	Anatoliy Tymoshchuk	(Ukraine)	30 Mar 1979	2009	Zenit Saint Petersburg	23(3)	3	5	0	5(1)	1
Strikers
11	Ivica Olić	(Croatia)	14 Sep 1979	2009	Hamburger SV	3(3)	0	0(1)	0	1(1)	0
18	Miroslav Klose	(Germany)	9 Jun 1978	2007	Werder Bremen	9(11)	1	3(1)	3	1(1)	1
25	Thomas Müller	(Germany)	13 Sep 1989	2000	Junior Team	23(2)	12	5	3	7(1)	3
33	Mario Gómez	(Germany)	10 Jul 1985	2009	VfB Stuttgart	27(5)	28	2(1)	3	6(2)	8
Players transferred after the start of the season
4	Edson Braafheid	(Netherlands)	8 Apr 1983	2009	Twente	2(1)	0	0(1)	0	0(1)	0
6	Martín Demichelis	(Argentina)	20 Dec 1980	2003	River Plate	3(3)	1	1	0	2	0
17	Mark van Bommel (captain)	(Netherlands)	22 Apr 1977	2006	Barcelona	12(1)	0	2	0	3	0
27	David Alaba	(Austria)	24 Jun 1992	2008	Junior Team	0(2)	0	0(1)	0	0	0
Last updated: 14 May 2011

== Goalscorers ==
All competitions

Scorer	Goals
(Germany) Mario Gómez	39
(Germany) Thomas Müller	19
(Netherlands) Arjen Robben	13
(France) Franck Ribéry	11
(Germany) Bastian Schweinsteiger	8
(Germany) Miroslav Klose	6
(Ukraine) Anatoliy Tymoshchuk	4
(Germany) Philipp Lahm	3
(Turkey) Hamit Altıntop	2
(Germany) Toni Kroos	2
(Belgium) Daniel Van Buyten	2
(Argentina) Martín Demichelis	1
(Brazil) Luiz Gustavo	1
(Germany) Andreas Ottl	1

Bundesliga

Scorer	Goals
(Germany) Mario Gómez	28
(Germany) Thomas Müller	12
(Netherlands) Arjen Robben	12
(France) Franck Ribéry	7
(Germany) Bastian Schweinsteiger	4
(Germany) Philipp Lahm	3
(Ukraine) Anatoliy Tymoshchuk	3
(Turkey) Hamit Altıntop	2
(Belgium) Daniel Van Buyten	2
(Argentina) Martín Demichelis	1
(Brazil) Luiz Gustavo	1
(Germany) Miroslav Klose	1
(Germany) Toni Kroos	1

UEFA Champions League

Scorer	Goals
(Germany) Mario Gómez	8
(Germany) Thomas Müller	3
(France) Franck Ribéry	2
(Germany) Bastian Schweinsteiger	2
(Germany) Miroslav Klose	1
(Ukraine) Anatoliy Tymoshchuk	1

DFB-Pokal

Scorer	Goals
(Germany) Mario Gómez	3
(Germany) Miroslav Klose	3
(Germany) Thomas Müller	3
(France) Franck Ribéry	2
(Germany) Bastian Schweinsteiger	2
(Germany) Toni Kroos	1
(Germany) Andreas Ottl	1
(Netherlands) Arjen Robben	1

Information current as of end of 14 May 2011

== Transfers and loans ==
=== Transfers in ===
No.	Pos.	Nat.	Name	Age	EU	Moving from	Type	Transfer window	Ends	Transfer fee	Source
2	DF	(Brazil)	Breno	20	Non-EU	1. FC Nürnberg	Loan return	Summer	2012	n/a	
16	MF	(Germany)	Andreas Ottl	25	EU	1. FC Nürnberg	Loan return	Summer	2011	n/a	
39	MF	(Germany)	Toni Kroos	20	EU	Bayer Leverkusen	Loan return	Summer	2012	n/a	
4	DF	(Netherlands)	Edson Braafheid	27	EU	Celtic (Scotland)	Loan return	Summer	2013	n/a	
22	GK	(Germany)	Rouven Sattelmaier	22	EU	Jahn Regensburg	Transfer	Summer	2012	Free	
30	MF	(Brazil)	Luiz Gustavo	23	Non-EU	1899 Hoffenheim	Transfer	Winter	2015	€15,000,000	

Total spending: ▼€15,000,000

=== Transfers out ===
No.	Pos.	Nat.	Name	Age	EU	Moving to	Type	Transfer window	Transfer fee	Source
1	GK	(Germany)	Michael Rensing	26	EU	1. FC Köln	End of contract	Summer	n/a	
13	DF	(Germany)	Andreas Görlitz	28	EU	FC Ingolstadt	End of contract	Summer	n/a	
9	FW	(Italy)	Luca Toni	32	EU	Genoa (Italy)	Released	Summer	n/a	
30	DF	(Germany)	Christian Lell	25	EU	Hertha BSC	Sold	Summer	€500,000	
32	MF	(Turkey)	Mehmet Ekici	20	EU	1. FC Nürnberg	Loaned out	Summer	n/a	
20	MF	(Argentina)	José Sosa	25	Non-EU	Napoli (Italy)	Sold	Summer	€3,000,000	
6	DF	(Argentina)	Martín Demichelis	29	Non-EU	Málaga (Spain)	Sold	Winter	undisclosed, reported €3,000,000–4,000,000	
27	MF	(Austria)	David Alaba	18	EU	1899 Hoffenheim	Loaned out	Winter	n/a	
17	MF	(Netherlands)	Mark van Bommel	33	EU	Milan (Italy)	Released	Winter	€1,500,000	
4	DF	(Netherlands)	Edson Braafheid	27	EU	1899 Hoffenheim	Released	Winter	Released	

Last updated: 3 January

Total income: ▲€8,000,000–9,000,000

== Management and coaching staff ==
Since the beginning of the 2009–10 season, Louis van Gaal is the manager of Bayern Munich. He brought some personnel of his own to the club.

Position	Staff
Manager	Louis van Gaal
Assistant manager	Andries Jonker
Assistant manager	Hermann Gerland
Goalkeeping coach	Frans Hoek
Sports psychologist	Philipp Laux
Fitness and rehab coach	Thomas Wilhelmi
Fitness coach	Marcelo Martins
Fitness coach	Andreas Kornmayer
Leading physician	Hans-Wilhelm Müller-Wohlfahrt
Physician	Lutz Hänsel
Physician	Peter Ueblacker
Physiotherapist	Fredi Binder
Physiotherapist	Gerry Hoffmann
Physiotherapist	Stephan Weickert
Physiotherapist	Gianni Bianchi
Match analyst	Marcel Bout
Video analyst	Max Reckers
Training physiologist	Jos van Dijk
