= Andreas Ottl =

German former footballer (born 1985)

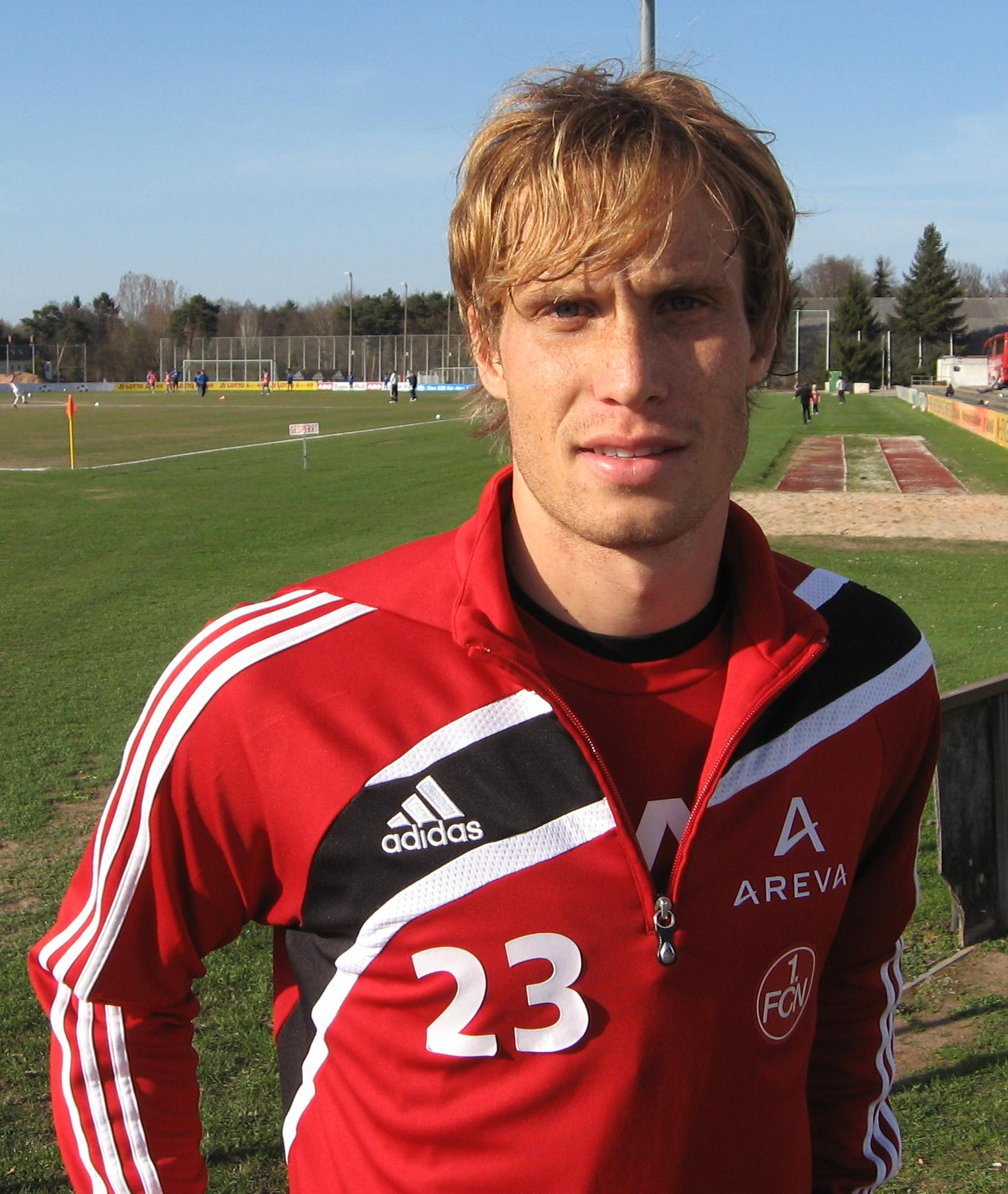
- Ottl with 1. FC Nürnberg in 2010

Personal information
- Date of birth: 1 March 1985 (age 41)
- Place of birth: Munich, West Germany
- Height: 1.86 m (6 ft 1 in)
- Position: Defensive midfielder

Youth career
- 1991–1996: SV Nord Lerchenau
- 1996–2003: Bayern Munich

Senior career*
| Years | Team | Apps | (Gls) |
| 2003–2007 | Bayern Munich II | 78 | (9) |
| 2005–2011 | Bayern Munich | 92 | (5) |
| 2010 | → 1. FC Nürnberg (loan) | 17 | (1) |
| 2011–2012 | Hertha BSC | 26 | (0) |
| 2012–2014 | FC Augsburg | 13 | (0) |
| Total | | 226 | (15) |

International career^{‡}
| 2004–2005 | Germany U-20 | 11 | (2) |
| 2005 | Team 2006 | 1 | (0) |
| 2006 | Germany U-21 | 4 | (0) |
Medal record
Bayern Munich
| Winner | Bundesliga | 2006 |
| Winner | DFB-Pokal | 2006 |
| Runner-up | DFB Liga-Pokal | 2006 |
| Winner | DFB Liga-Pokal | 2007 |
| Winner | Bundesliga | 2008 |
| Winner | DFB-Pokal | 2008 |
| Winner | DFL-Supercup | 2010 |
- * Club domestic league appearances and goals as of 05:14, 24 May 2013 (UTC) ‡ National team caps and goals as of 1 January 2010

Andreas Ottl (German pronunciation: [anˈdʁeːas ˈʔɔtl̩]; born 1 March 1985) is a German former professional footballer who played as a defensive midfielder. He signed his first professional contract for Bayern Munich in 2005. He also played for Germany's U-21 Team.

== Career ==
=== Bayern Munich ===
==== 2003–2009 ====
Ottl began playing for Bayern Munich in 1996 after his parents had originally refused to let him leave hometown club Nord Lerchenau for Bayern. He played for the Junior Team where he won three youth championships, before being promoted to the reserve team in 2003. During the 2003–04 season, in the Regionalliga Süd, Ottl scored a goal in 25 matches. He would go to score five goals in 34 matches and make four appearances in the German Cup the following season. Having become a key player of the reserve team in the third division, he was given the chance to play for the senior team in 2005. At the time, Ottl was one of six players (along with Philipp Lahm, Christian Lell, Stephan Fürstner, Sandro Wagner) of the Bayern Munich junior team to feature in the Bundesliga squad. He signed professional forms on 1 July 2005, his first full-time contract, thus following in the footsteps of Bastian Schweinsteiger, Owen Hargreaves and others.

On 13 August 2005, Ottl made his debut for Bayern Munich, coming on as a substitute for Hasan Salihamidžić in a 5–2 win over Bayer Leverkusen. On 15 October 2005, Ottl made his first start in a 3–0 win over Schalke 04 and played 90 minutes. On 5 June 2006, Ottl scored his first goal against 1. FC Kaiserslautern in a 1–1 draw. In his first season, Ottl scored a goal in only eight league appearances and the club won the league title. He also scored two goals in 18 appearances during the 2005–06 Regionalliga season for the reserve team. The following season, Ottl made 24 appearances. He scored his only Bundesliga goal of the season against Schalke. He made his Champions League debut in a 2–0 win over Inter Milan where he received a booking and played 90 minutes. Under Ottmar Hitzfeld, Ottl got more playing time and more often used often because he could play all positions in the midfield or central defense. He also scored a goal in two matches in the German Cup, played in two German League Cup matches, and played in seven Champions League matches.

In the 2007–08 season, Ottl featured less, making 19 appearances. Ottl soon found himself lower in the pecking order and once again spent time on the bench after the arrival of Mark van Bommel and Franck Ribéry. This led Ottl to consider leaving the club in order to secure first-team football if he failed to be given enough games in the coming months. However, Ottl did not leave the club that season winning another league title and the DFB-Pokal with Bayern. He also made three German Cup appearances, three German League Cup matches, and eight UEFA Cup matches. After the 2008–09 season with 22 appearances, he played less under new manager Louis van Gaal. Earlier in the season, Ottl was among players who should be sold but Ottl insisted he wanted to stay at the club. He also had four German Cup appearances and six Champions League appearances. He made four Bundesliga appearances, one German Cup appearance, and four Champions League appearances during the 2009–10 season for Bayern Munich. Ottl, along with teammate Breno, was loaned out on 1 January 2010 to 1. FC Nürnberg for the remainder of the season.

==== Loan to 1. FC Nürnberg ====
In order to get more first team opportunities, Ottl was loaned out to 1. FC Nürnberg, along with Breno, from January 2010 to June 2010. On 17 January 2010, Ottl made his debut for the club in a 1–0 loss against Schalke 04. Since making his debut, Ottl established himself in the starting eleven. In the last game of the season on 8 May 2010, Ottl scored his only goal in the game as Nürnberg won 1–0, ending a four-match drought without a win. The club avoided relegation when they won the Bundesliga play-offs against FC Augsburg. The club won 3–0 on aggregate to stay in the Bundesliga. He finished his loan spell with a goal in 17 league appearances, no German Cup appearances, and two relegation playoff appearances.

==== 2010–11 season ====
After his loan-spell at 1. FC Nürnberg, Ottl returned and vowed to fight for a place in the side as he tried to break into the first team. He played in the German Super Cup. In the first half of the season, Ottl replaced captain van Bommel. On 20 November 2011, Ottl made his 100th appearance for Bayern Munich in a 1–1 draw against Bayer Leverkusen. In the round of 16 of the DFB-Pokal on 22 December 2010, Ottl scored his first goal in over two years in 6–3 thriller win over Stuttgart. He finished the season with 15 league appearances, a goal in three German Cup appearances, three Champions League appearances, and a German Super Cup appearance.

Ottl played 109 Bundesliga games scoring nine goals. In the Champions League he played 20 matches. He won three German championships and three cups as a Bayern Munich player.

=== Hertha BSC ===
On 21 May 2011, Andreas Ottl became the fourth new signing for Hertha BSC after he signed a three-year contract with the club on a free transfer following his released by Bayern Munich. He had been a Bayern Munich player for 15 years before joining Hertha BSC on 1 July. Ottl scored on his Hertha BSC debut in the 4–0 win over ZFC Meuselwitz on 31 July 2011 in the DFB-Pokal. On 6 August 2011, Ottl made his league debut for the club in a 1–1 draw against Nürnberg. On 11 February 2012, Ottl received a straight red card in a 5–0 loss against Stuttgart.

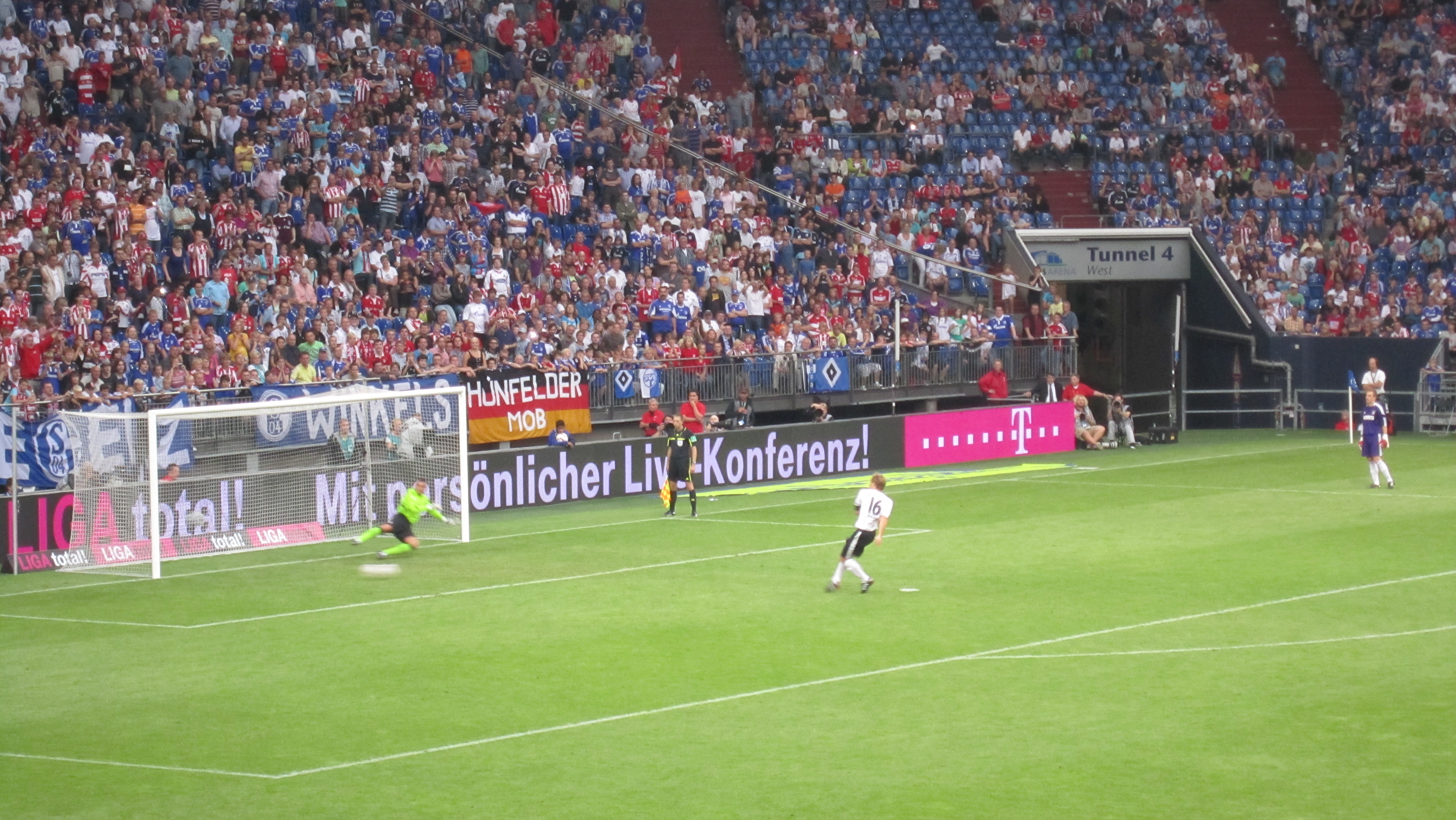
Andreas Ottl LIGA Total! Cup 2010

On 16 October 2011, Ottl returned for the first time with Hertha back to his old club Bayern Munich which turned out to be a quite bitter reunion for Ottl; the Berlin club lost 0–4. Prior to the game, Ottl and two other members of Hertha (Christian Lell and Thomas Kraft) were honored with a bouquet of flowers by the Bayern staff and the fans were chanting pro Ottl throughout the game.

He was released on 6 June 2012, along with several other players, after the club was relegated from the Bundesliga. He finished his only season at Hertha with 26 Bundesliga appearances and a goal in three German Cup appearances.

=== FC Augsburg ===
On 9 July 2012, Ottl signed for FC Augsburg on a two-year deal. Ottl made 16 appearances during the 2012–13 season; failing to score a goal. The limited number of appearances was partially due to an injury he picked up against Bayern Munich. Ottl failed to make any appearances during the 2013–14 season despite being fit. Ottl's contract expired without any extension.

=== Late career ===
Ottl stated he wanted to play for a team outside of Germany, because the Bundesliga "no longer interests him." He had several offers and was in negotiations with two European clubs from outside Germany. He was still without a contract when the January 2016 transfer window closed.

== RippleWorx, Inc. ==
Ottl, in 2017, became a member of the performance acceleration technology company, RippleWorx, Inc., to work with the company founders: Jonas Hummels, Dr. Timo Sandritter, Angie Sandritter, and Brian Hadley.

== Personal life ==
Ottl was born in Munich, West Germany on 1 March 1985. Ottl is long-time friends with Philipp Lahm who like to play snooker and tennis together. His girlfriend started an online company for home furnishings. Ottl is one of the shareholders of the company.

== Career statistics ==
As of 1 September 2015.

| Club | Season | League | | | Cup^{1} | | League Cup^{2} | | Continental^{3} | | Other^{4} | | Total | | Ref. |
| Club | Season | League | Apps | Goals | Apps | Goals | Apps | Goals | Apps | Goals | Apps | Goals | Apps | Goals | Ref. |
|---|---|---|---|---|---|---|---|---|---|---|---|---|---|---|---|
| Bayern Munich II | 2003–04 | Regionalliga Süd | 25 | 1 | — | | — | | | | — | | 25 | 1 | |
| Bayern Munich II | 2004–05 | Regionalliga Süd | 34 | 5 | 4 | 0 | — | | | | — | | 38 | 5 | |
| Bayern Munich II | 2005–06 | Regionalliga Süd | 18 | 2 | — | | — | | | | — | | 18 | 2 | |
| Bayern Munich II | 2006–07 | Regionalliga Süd | 1 | 1 | — | | — | | | | — | | 1 | 1 | |
| Bayern Munich II | Totals | | 78 | 9 | 4 | 0 | — | | | | — | | 82 | 9 | — |
| Bayern Munich | 2004–05 | Bundesliga | 0 | 0 | 0 | 0 | 0 | 0 | 0 | 0 | — | | 0 | 0 | |
| Bayern Munich | 2005–06 | Bundesliga | 8 | 1 | 2 | 1 | 0 | 0 | 0 | 0 | — | | 8 | 1 | |
| Bayern Munich | 2006–07 | Bundesliga | 24 | 1 | 2 | 1 | 2 | 0 | 7 | 0 | — | | 35 | 2 | |
| Bayern Munich | 2007–08 | Bundesliga | 19 | 3 | 3 | 0 | 3 | 0 | 8 | 0 | — | | 33 | 3 | |
| Bayern Munich | 2008–09 | Bundesliga | 22 | 0 | 4 | 0 | — | | 6 | 0 | — | | 32 | 0 | |
| Bayern Munich | 2009–10 | Bundesliga | 4 | 0 | 1 | 0 | — | | 4 | 0 | — | | 9 | 0 | |
| Bayern Munich | 2010–11 | Bundesliga | 15 | 0 | 3 | 1 | — | | 3 | 0 | 1 | 0 | 22 | 1 | |
| Bayern Munich | Totals | | 92 | 5 | 15 | 3 | 5 | 0 | 28 | 0 | 1 | 0 | 141 | 8 | — |
| Nürnberg (loan) | 2009–10 | Bundesliga | 17 | 1 | 0 | 0 | — | | | | 2 | 0 | 19 | 1 | |
| Hertha BSC | 2011–12 | Bundesliga | 26 | 0 | 3 | 1 | — | | | | 0 | 0 | 29 | 1 | |
| Augsburg | 2012–13 | Bundesliga | 13 | 0 | 3 | 0 | — | | | | — | | 16 | 0 | |
| Augsburg | 2013–14 | Bundesliga | 0 | 0 | 0 | 0 | — | | | | — | | 0 | 0 | |
| Augsburg | Totals | | 13 | 0 | 3 | 0 | — | | | | — | | 16 | 0 | — |
| Career totals | | | 226 | 15 | 25 | 2 | 5 | 0 | 28 | 0 | 3 | 0 | 287 | 17 | — |

- 1.Includes DFB-Pokal.
- 2.Includes DFB-Ligapokal.
- 3.Includes UEFA Champions League and UEFA Cup.
- 4.Includes Relegation playoff and German Super Cup.

== Honours ==
- German U-17 youth championship: 2001
- German U-19 youth championship: 2002 and 2004
- German third division south championship: 2004
- Bundesliga: 2005–06, 2007–08
- DFB-Pokal: 2005–06, 2007–08
- DFB-Ligapokal: 2007
- DFB-Supercup: 2010
