= Butz =

Butz is a surname. Notable people with the surname include:

- Albert Butz (1849–1905) was a Swiss-born American inventor and businessman
- Arthur Butz (born 1933), American professor and Holocaust denier
- Caspar Butz (1825–1885), German American journalist and politician
- Dave Butz (1950–2022), American football player
- Donald J. Butz (born 1933), U. S. Air Force major-general
- Earl Butz (1909–2008), American Secretary of Agriculture under Presidents Nixon and Ford
- Edwin Butz (1864–1956), Seventh-day Adventist missionary active in Oceania and Australia
- Frank Butz or Frank Dundr (born 1957), German rower
- Laura Chenoweth Butz (1860–1939), American educator
- Norbert Leo Butz (born 1967), American actor
- Steve Butz (born 1959), American politician

== See also ==
- Charles W. Buttz (1837–1913), American politician
- Buts, surname
- Butts (surname)
- Betz (disambiguation)
- Larry Butz, a fictional character in the Ace Attorney series
- Bartz Klauser, a Final Fantasy V character whose name was rendered "Butz" in some versions
