= Buts =

Buts is a surname. Notable people with the name include:

- Petro Buts (born 1966), Ukrainian football player and coach
- Vitaliy Buts (born 1986), Ukrainian road bicycle racer

== See also ==
- Butts (surname)
- Butz, surname
- But (surname)
