= But (surname) =

But or Bout (Russian: Бут) is a gender-neutral Slavic surname that may refer to:

- Serhiy But (born 1969), Ukrainian Olympic freestyle skier
- Veniamin But (born 1961), Russian rower
- Viktor Bout (born 1967), Russian arms dealer
- Vladimir But (born 1977), Russian football midfielder

== See also ==
- Butt (surname)
- Buts, surname
