= Diego Contento =

German footballer (born 1990)

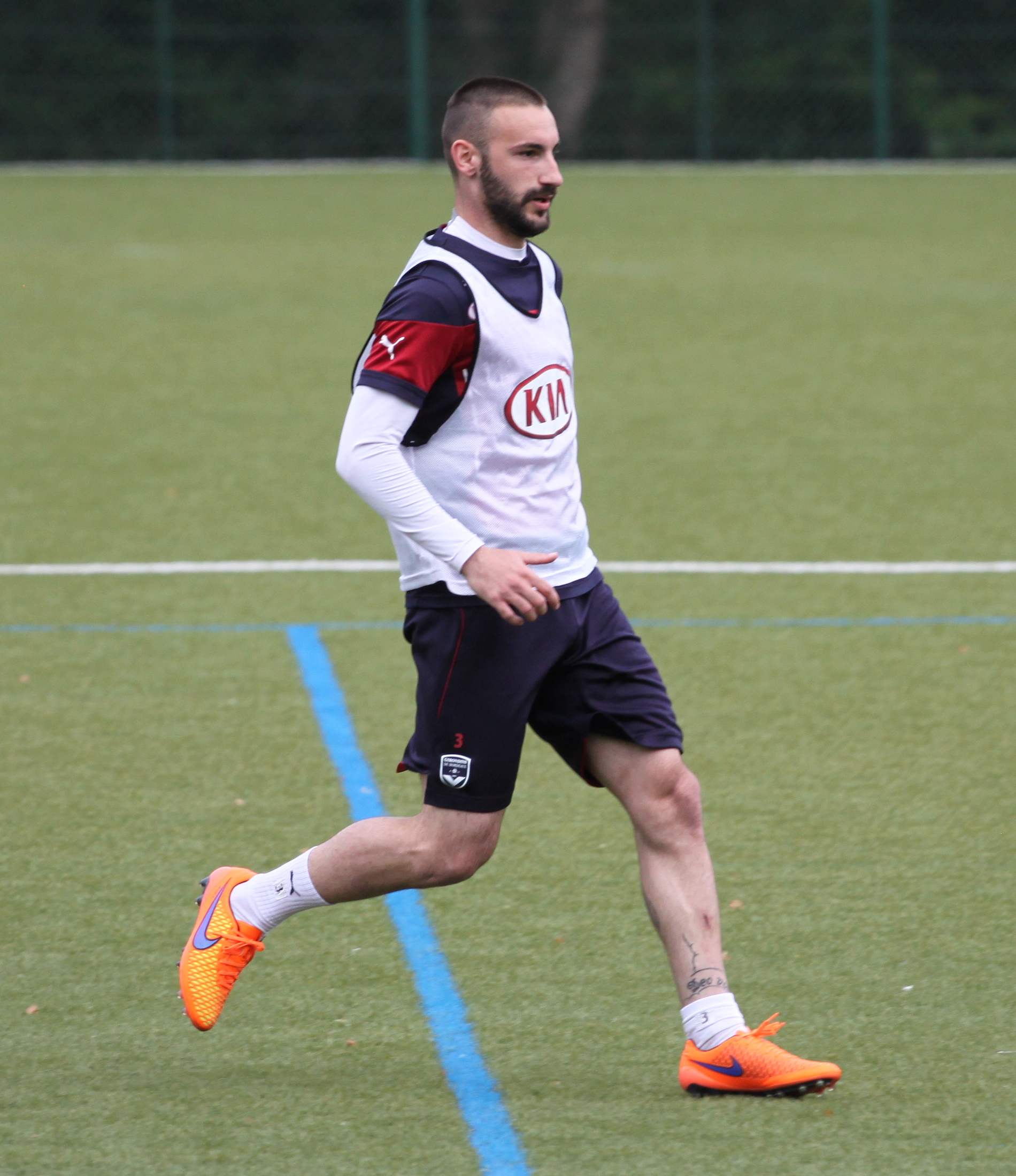
- Contento with Bordeaux in 2015

Personal information
- Full name: Diego Armando Valentin Contento
- Date of birth: 1 May 1990 (age 36)
- Place of birth: Munich, West Germany
- Height: 1.77 m (5 ft 10 in)
- Position: Left-back

Youth career
- 1995–2008: Bayern Munich

Senior career*
Years	Team	Apps	(Gls)
2008–2011	Bayern Munich II	36	(2)
2010–2014	Bayern Munich	49	(0)
2014–2018	Bordeaux	74	(2)
2018–2020	Fortuna Düsseldorf	0	(0)
2020	Fortuna Düsseldorf II	1	(0)
2020–2021	SV Sandhausen	24	(0)
Total		184	(4)

International career
2007	Germany U17	2	(0)
2009–2010	Germany U20	4	(0)
Medal record
Bayern Munich
Winner	Bundesliga	2010
Winner	DFB-Pokal	2010
Runner-up	UEFA Champions League	2010
Winner	DFL-Supercup	2010
Runner-up	DFB-Pokal	2012
Runner-up	UEFA Champions League	2012
Winner	DFL-Supercup	2012
Winner	Bundesliga	2013
Winner	UEFA Champions League	2013
Winner	DFB-Pokal	2013
Runner-up	DFL-Supercup	2013
Winner	UEFA Super Cup	2013
Winner	FIFA Club World Cup	2013
Winner	Bundesliga	2014
Winner	DFB-Pokal	2014
- * Club domestic league appearances and goals

Diego Armando Valentin Contento (born 1 May 1990) is a German former professional footballer who played as a left-back, mainly for Bayern Munich in the Bundesliga and Bordeaux in the French Ligue 1.

== Personal life ==
Contento's family is from the outskirts of Naples (his father from Casalnuovo di Napoli and his mother from Caivano), Italy, and he was named after former Napoli star Diego Armando Maradona. His older brothers Vincenzo and Domenico were previously in Bayern's youth team.

== Club career ==
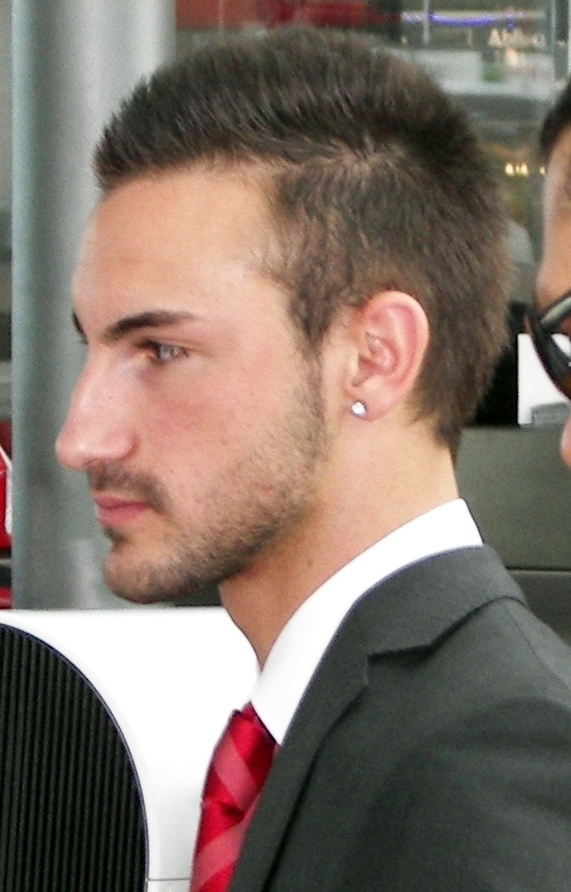
Contento in 2010

Contento played for Bayern Munich's first-team in pre-season friendlies in 2009, appearing against Austrian Bundesliga champion Red Bull Salzburg as a second-half substitute for Edson Braafheid, and was named on the substitutes' bench for a Bundesliga match against Mainz 05 in August 2009. He was called up to Bayern Munich's squad for the 2009–10 UEFA Champions League, where he was assigned the number 26. In January 2010, it was announced that Contento would train with the first-team for the rest of the 2009–10 season, along with reserve team-mates David Alaba and Mehmet Ekici.

Contento signed his first professional contract with Bayern Munich on 13 January 2010. The trio were named on the first-team substitutes' bench for the first time on 10 February 2010, for a DFB-Pokal game against Greuther Fürth, and Contento came on in the 59th minute, replacing Anatoliy Tymoshchuk. Contento made his UEFA Champions League debut a week later, coming on as a half time substitute for Daniel Van Buyten in a game against Fiorentina, and the following weekend he made his league debut in the Bavarian Derby against 1. FC Nürnberg, starting in place of the injured Van Buyten.

He was in the starting XI for the next two games against Hamburger SV and 1. FC Köln, but was injured in the latter, and replaced by fellow youth team graduate David Alaba. On 21 April 2010 he was named in the starting line-up for Bayern's UEFA Champions League semi-final first leg against Lyon. On 27 May 2010, Contento signed a contract extension keeping him at the Allianz Arena until 2013.

Contento started in the 2010 German Super Cup and played the full 90 minutes. Bayern defeated Schalke 04 2–0. Contento began the 2010–11 season as a starter for Bayern. After five games, he suffered an injury and was sidelined for three weeks. He was unable to reclaim his starting spot until the very end of the season. He was first choice to Andries Jonker, the caretaker manager of Bayern Munich until the end of the 2010–11 league season. On 1 July 2011, Jupp Heynckes was named head coach of Bayern Munich. At the beginning of the new Bundesliga season, Heynckes brought in Rafinha for the right back position. Team captain Philipp Lahm changed back to his favoured left side and Contento was mostly relegated to the bench. However, he was in the starting XI in the 2012 UEFA Champions League Final against Chelsea.

On 12 August 2014, Contento signed four-year deal with Ligue 1 side, Bordeaux. He had been at Bayern for 19 years.

On 22 May 2018, Contento inked a two-year deal with Fortuna Düsseldorf returning him to the Bundesliga after a four-year spell in France. Contento suffered a cruciate ligament tear in September 2018. During his time with Düsseldorf, Contento only managed to appear in one cup game.

On 1 July 2020, Contento signed with 2. Bundesliga side SV Sandhausen.

Contento announced his retirement from playing in March 2023.

== International career ==
Contento represented Germany at under-17 and under-20 level. In 2010, he expressed his desire to represent Italy rather than Germany at senior level. Contento was called up to the Germany under-21 in September 2010, though he could not make his debut due to an irritation on a toe.

== Career statistics ==
Appearances and goals by club, season and competition
Club	Season	League			Cup (Note: Includes DFB-Pokal and Coupe de France.)		Continental (Note: Includes UEFA Champions League and UEFA Europa League.)		Other (Note: Includes German Super Cup and Coupe de la Ligue.)		Total		Ref.
Club	Season	League	Apps	Goals	Apps	Goals	Apps	Goals	Apps	Goals	Apps	Goals	Ref.
Bayern Munich II	2008–09	3. Liga	12	2	—		—		—		12	2	
Bayern Munich II	2009–10	3. Liga	16	0	—		—		—		16	0	
Bayern Munich II	2010–11	3. Liga	8	0	—		—		—		8	0	
Bayern Munich II	Total		36	2	0	0	0	0	0	0	36	2	—
Bayern Munich	2009–10	Bundesliga	9	0	2	0	3	0	—		14	0	
Bayern Munich	2010–11	Bundesliga	14	0	1	0	3	0	1	0	19	0	
Bayern Munich	2011–12	Bundesliga	11	0	2	0	2	0	—		15	0	
Bayern Munich	2012–13	Bundesliga	5	0	2	0	1	0	0	0	8	0	
Bayern Munich	2013–14	Bundesliga	10	0	1	0	2	0	0	0	13	0	
Bayern Munich	Total		49	0	8	0	11	0	1	0	69	0	—
Bordeaux	2014–15	Ligue 1	25	0	2	0	—		1	1	28	1	
Bordeaux	2015–16	Ligue 1	25	2	1	0	5	0	3	0	34	2	
Bordeaux	2016–17	Ligue 1	25	0	1	0	—		1	0	27	0	
Bordeaux	2017–18	Ligue 1	3	0	0	0	2	0	0	0	5	0	
Bordeaux	Total		78	2	4	0	7	0	5	1	94	3	—
Fortuna Düsseldorf	2018–19	Bundesliga	0	0	1	0	—		—		1	0	
Fortuna Düsseldorf	2019–20	Bundesliga	0	0	0	0	—		—		0	0	
Fortuna Düsseldorf	Total		0	0	1	0	0	0	0	0	1	0	—
Fortuna Düsseldorf II	2019–20	Regionalliga West	1	0	—		—		—		1	0	
SV Sandhausen	2020–21	2. Bundesliga	24	0	2	0	—		—		26	0	
Career total			188	4	15	0	18	0	6	1	227	5	—

== Honours ==
Bayern Munich

- Bundesliga: 2009–10, 2012–13, 2013–14
- DFB-Pokal: 2009–10, 2012–13, 2013–14
- DFB-Supercup: 2010, 2012
- UEFA Champions League: 2012–13; runner-up: 2009–10, 2011–12
- UEFA Super Cup: 2013
- FIFA Club World Cup: 2013
