= Charles Sinclair Butt =

Australian businessman

- Born: 28 July 1900
- Died: 21 January 1973 (aged 72)

Charles Sinclair Butt (28 July 1900 – 21 January 1973) was an Australian businessman. He worked for the Rapson Tyre company and the Dunlop Rubber Company. By 1934 he was Dunlop's chief accountant. He also served as general manager and Controller of Tyres for the Olympic Tyre & Rubber Co. Limited.

In 1962, he was made a Companion of the Order of St Michael and St George.
