= Alfred Butts (disambiguation) =

Alfred Butts (1899–1993) was an American architect and inventor of Scrabble.

Alfred Butts or Butt may also refer to:

- Alfred Benjamin Butts (1890–1962), American political scientist and university administrator
- Alfie Butts, fictional character on the British sitcom My Family
- Alfred Butt (1878–1962), British theatre impresario
- Sir Alfred Kenneth Dudley Butt, 2nd Baronet, see Butt baronets
