= John Butt =

John Butt may refer to:

- John Butt (bishop) (1826–1899), English Roman Catholic bishop
- John Butt (sport shooter) (1850–1939), English sport shooter
- John Everett Butt (1906–1965), English literary scholar
- John Butt (politician) (born 1941), Canadian politician
- John Mohammed Butt (born 1950), Trinidad-born British Islamic scholar and broadcaster
- John Butt (musician) (born 1960), English conductor, organist, harpsichordist and scholar

== See also ==
- John But (fl. 1402–1425), English politician
- John Butts (disambiguation)
- Johnny Butt (1870–1931), English film actor
