= Hans-Jörg Butt =

German footballer (born 1974)

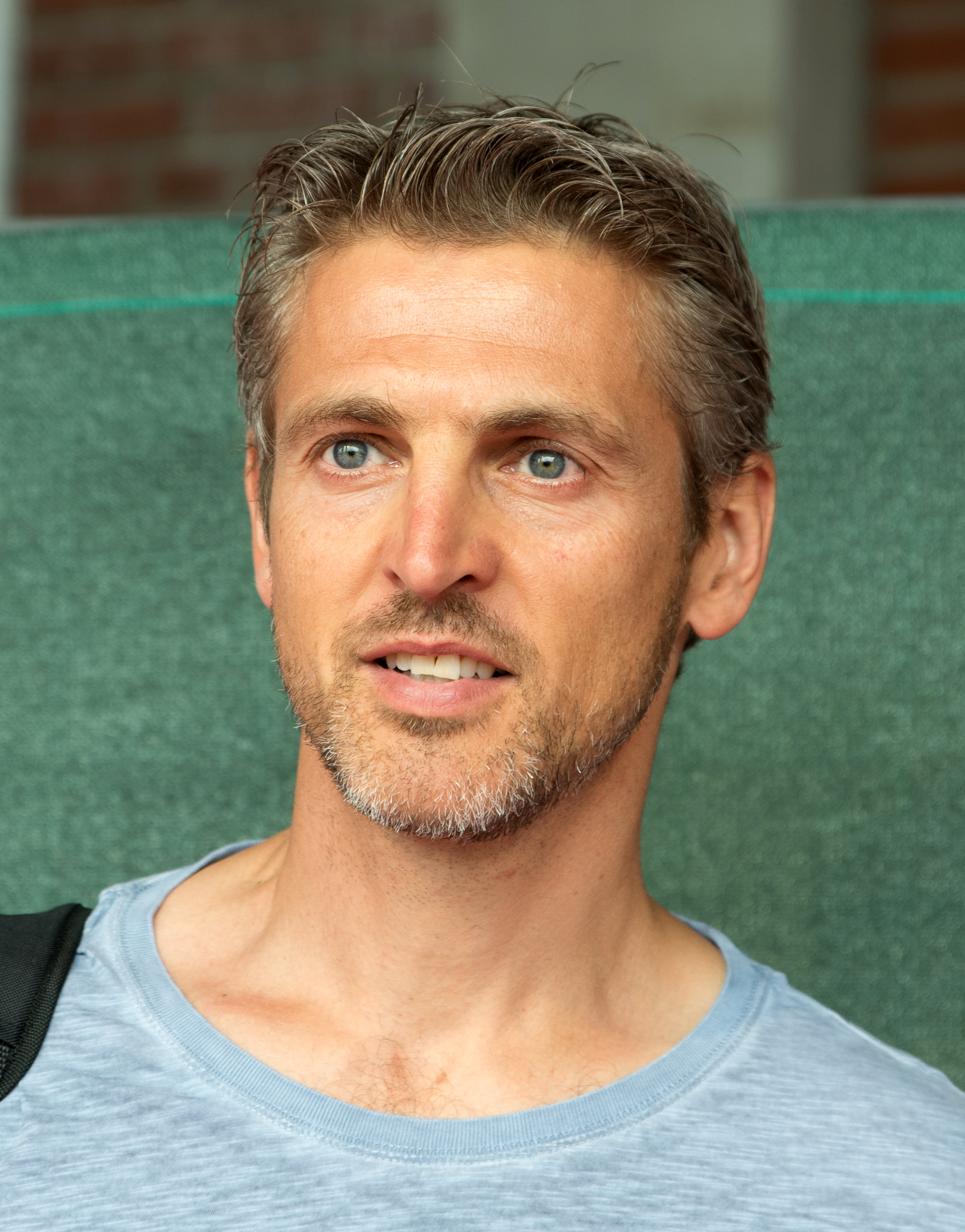
- Butt in 2016

Personal information
- Full name: Hans-Jörg Butt
- Date of birth: 28 May 1974 (age 52)
- Place of birth: Oldenburg, West Germany
- Height: 1.91 m (6 ft 3 in)
- Position: Goalkeeper

Youth career
- 1980–1991: TSV Großenkneten
- 1991–1994: VfB Oldenburg

Senior career*
Years	Team	Apps	(Gls)
1994–1997	VfB Oldenburg	87	(5)
1997–2001	Hamburger SV	133	(19)
2001–2007	Bayer Leverkusen	191	(7)
2007–2008	Benfica	1	(0)
2008–2012	Bayern Munich	63	(0)
2009	Bayern Munich II	4	(1)
Total		479	(32)

International career
2000–2010	Germany	4	(0)
Medal record
Representing Germany
Men's football
FIFA World Cup
Runner-up	2002 Korea–Japan
Third place	2010 South Africa
- * Club domestic league appearances and goals

Hans-Jörg Butt (German pronunciation: [hans ˈjœʁk ˈbʊt]; born 28 May 1974), often simply called Jörg Butt, is a German former footballer who played as a goalkeeper.

Known for taking penalty kicks, and for often running into the opposing penalty box in an attempt to find a winner whenever his team were trailing, he scored 26 goals in the Bundesliga. He played for Hamburger SV, Bayer Leverkusen and Bayern Munich in his country, having arrived at Munich already aged 34.

Butt represented Germany in two World Cups and at Euro 2000.

== Personal life ==
Butt was born in Oldenburg and raised in nearby Großenkneten, where his father Jochen ran a company manufacturing loading ramps and industrial doors. As a youngster, he played for the junior teams of his local football club, TSV Großenkneten, as a striker.

Butt is married to Katja. As of November 2010, the couple had three children – a daughter and two sons.

== Club career ==
=== Hamburg/Leverkusen ===
Butt started his professional career with modest Oldenburg, achieving promotion to the second division in 1996. He moved to Hamburg in the 1997 summer and, in his second season, scored seven goals for the team – all from the penalty spot – adding nine in similar fashion the following campaign.

Butt joined Bayer Leverkusen on a free transfer in 2001, being the side's undisputed starter in the subsequent campaigns (he only missed one Bundesliga match in his first five seasons combined and added seven goals), and appeared in all the games (17) for a team that lost to Real Madrid in the 2001–02 UEFA Champions League final, scoring a penalty in a 3–1 home win against Juventus in the second group stage.

In 2003–04, after scoring a penalty in an away match against Schalke 04 on 17 April 2004, Butt turned away from midfield and began to enthusiastically celebrate with his teammates. He did not notice the whistle for the restart of the game and continued to celebrate. Schalke player Mike Hanke took the opportunity to shoot from the halfway line and scored while Butt was still jogging back to his position.

=== Benfica ===
After losing Leverkusen's nets to the young René Adler during the 2006–07 season, Butt decided to cancel the contract that linked him to the club until 2009, activating a clause that allowed him to leave the club should he fail to appear in more than half of the games during the second half of the campaign. In July 2007, he signed a two-year deal with Portuguese club Benfica.

Butt made his Eagles debut in the summer tournament of Torneio de Guadiana, held between Benfica, Sporting CP and Real Betis. In the competition, he saved a penalty against Betis, helping Benfica with the final win. At the Lisbon outfit, however, he played understudy to Portuguese international Quim, being used in the domestic cup matches. He only made one league appearance for Benfica, coming on as a substitute after Quim was sent off against C.S. Marítimo in October 2007 – in this match, he saved a penalty from Ariza Makukula with his first touch of the game, and his team eventually won 2–1.

=== Bayern Munich ===
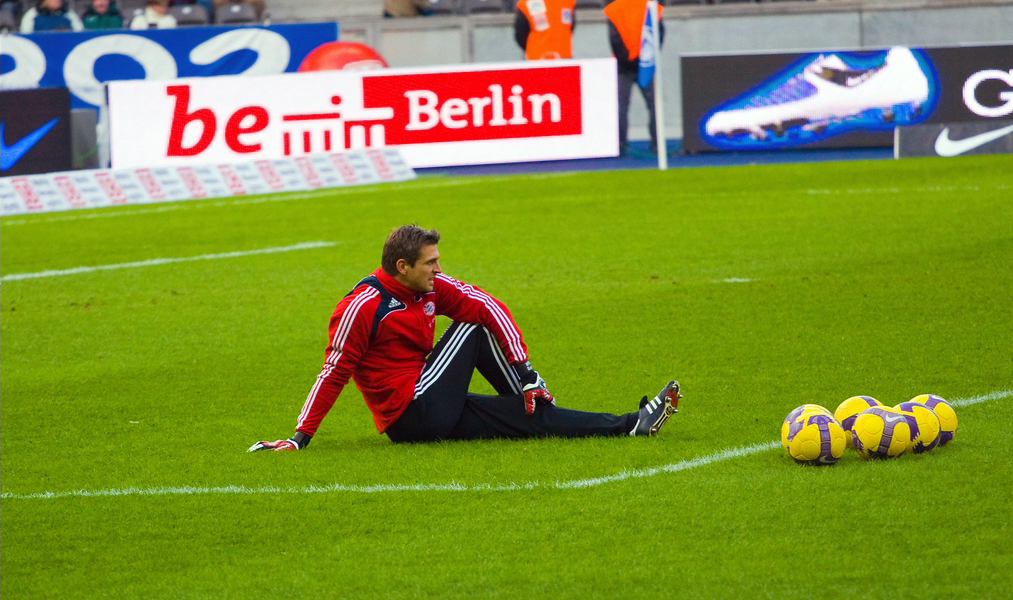
Butt with Bayern in 2009

On 4 June 2008, Butt signed a two-year contract with reigning champions Bayern Munich and was expected to act as backup to Oliver Kahn's heir, highly rated young Michael Rensing. He made his official debut for the club in the Champions League round-of-16 second leg against Sporting CP in a 7–1 home drubbing, on 10 March 2009. With Rensing dropped to the bench following a 5–1 loss at Wolfsburg, he also started the remaining games of the season, as the initial first-choice was also nursing a hand injury.

After the team's poor start to the 2009–10 season with Rensing in goal, Butt was reinstated as the first-choice. On 8 December 2009, he scored his first goal for the club, a crucial penalty in the club's last Champions League group stage match at Juventus, coming from behind to a 4–1 victory – after this feat, he has managed to score a goal against Juventus in the Champions League for all three major German clubs he represented.

On 30 January 2010, Butt missed out on the opportunity to score his first league goal for Bayern as his penalty was saved by 1. FSV Mainz 05's Heinz Müller, but it proved to be of no detriment to the club as it won 3–0. On 16 February, he was rewarded for an outstanding season with a contract extension until 2011. He was also in goal for the Champions League final, where his team was denied an historic treble after losing 0–2 to Inter Milan.

Midway through the 2010–11 season, 36-year-old Butt lost his starting place to another club youth graduate, Thomas Kraft. However, a series of unconvincing displays by the youngster, including a 2–3 home loss against Inter Milan in the Champions League Round of 16 on 15 March 2011, and a 1–1 away draw with 1. FC Nürnberg on 9 April, paved the way for the veteran to return to the starting line-up, which happened on 17 April, in a 5–1 home victory over former club Bayer Leverkusen, and he still appeared in 30 official games during the campaign (23 in the league), as his team finished in third position.

On 3 May 2011, Butt signed a one-year extension to his contract with Bayern, backing up newly signed Manuel Neuer. He retired at the end of the season at the age of 38, after a friendly with the Netherlands on 22 May 2012 in which he acted as captain.

== International career ==
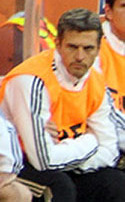
Butt with Germany at the 2010 World Cup

Butt was Germany's third-choice goalkeeper, behind Oliver Kahn and Jens Lehmann, at both the UEFA Euro 2000 and the 2002 FIFA World Cup, remaining an unused substitute in both tournaments.

He won three international caps for Germany in friendly matches, his debut coming against Liechtenstein on 7 June 2000, where he appeared for the second half of an 8–2 routing.

Butt, Manuel Neuer and Tim Wiese were chosen as Germany's goalkeepers for the 2010 World Cup, with Butt taking the place of former Leverkusen teammate René Adler, who had to withdraw due to a rib injury. He made his only competitive international appearance on 10 July, appearing in the 3–2 win against Uruguay in the tournament's third-place playoff.

== Post-retirement ==
Butt was appointed head of the Bayern Munich Junior Team on 1 July 2012. He left the position on 7 August, stating "I misjudged this field of activity, for which I've had responsibility for a few weeks now. I approached my new appointment with great enthusiasm, but I have realised that the task does not offer the satisfaction and passion I wanted. This is the reason for my decision. I would like to thank FC Bayern for their understanding."

== Career statistics ==
=== Club ===
Appearances and goals by club, season and competition
Club	Season	League			Cup		League cup		Europe		Other		Total	
Club	Season		Apps	Goals	Apps	Goals	Apps	Goals	Apps	Goals	Apps	Goals	Apps	Goals
VfB Oldenburg	1994–95	Regionalliga Nord	33	0	—		—		—		—		33	0
VfB Oldenburg	1995–96	Regionalliga Nord	34	4	—		—		—		—		36	6
VfB Oldenburg	1996–97	2. Bundesliga	20	1	2	0	—		—		—		22	1
VfB Oldenburg	Total		87	5	2	0	—		—		—		89	5
Hamburger SV	1997–98	Bundesliga	33	0	2	0	—		0	0	—		35	0
Hamburger SV	1998–99	Bundesliga	34	7	3	0	—		—		—		37	7
Hamburger SV	1999–00	Bundesliga	34	9	1	0	—		—		—		35	9
Hamburger SV	2000–01	Bundesliga	32	3	2	0	1	0	10	1	—		45	4
Hamburger SV	Total		133	19	8	0	1	0	10	1	—		152	20
Bayer Leverkusen	2001–02	Bundesliga	34	2	6	0	1	0	19	1	—		60	3
Bayer Leverkusen	2002–03	Bundesliga	33	1	4	0	—		10	0	—		47	1
Bayer Leverkusen	2003–04	Bundesliga	34	1	3	0	—		—		—		37	1
Bayer Leverkusen	2004–05	Bundesliga	34	2	2	0	1	0	10	0	—		47	2
Bayer Leverkusen	2005–06	Bundesliga	34	1	2	0	1	0	2	0	—		39	1
Bayer Leverkusen	2006–07	Bundesliga	22	0	2	0	1	0	8	0	—		33	0
Bayer Leverkusen	Total		191	7	19	0	4	0	49	1	—		263	8
Benfica	2007–08	Primeira Liga	1	0	4	0	2	0	0	0	—		7	0
Bayern Munich	2008–09	Bundesliga	8	0	0	0	—		3	0	—		11	0
Bayern Munich	2009–10	Bundesliga	31	0	3	0	—		12	1	—		46	1
Bayern Munich	2010–11	Bundesliga	23	0	2	0	—		4	0	0	0	29	0
Bayern Munich	2011–12	Bundesliga	1	0	1	0	—		1	0	—		3	0
Bayern Munich	Total		63	0	6	0	—		20	1	0	0	89	1
Bayern Munich II	2008–09	3. Liga	4	1	—		—		—		—		4	1
Career total			479	32	37	0	7	0	79	3	0	0	602	35

=== International ===
Appearances and goals by national team and year
National team	Year	Apps	Goals
Germany	2000	1	0
Germany	2002	1	0
Germany	2003	1	0
Germany	2010	1	0
Total		4	0

== Honours ==
VfB Oldenburg

- Regionalliga Nord: 1995–96

Bayer Leverkusen

- UEFA Champions League runner-up: 2001–02
- DFB-Pokal runner-up: 2001–02

Bayern Munich

- Bundesliga: 2009–10
- DFB-Pokal: 2009–10
- DFL-Supercup: 2010
- UEFA Champions League runner-up: 2009–10, 2011–12

Germany

- FIFA World Cup runner-up: 2002, third place 2010

Individual

- kicker Goalkeeper of the Year: 2009–10
- kicker Bundesliga Team of the Season: 1999–2000, 2009–10

Orders

- Silbernes Lorbeerblatt: 2002, 2010
