= Charles Butts =

Charles Butts may refer to:

- Charles L. Butts (born 1942), member of the Ohio Senate (1975–1990)
- Charles Butts (paleontologist) (1863–1946), American paleontologist

== See also ==
- Charles W. Buttz (1837–1913), U.S. Representative from South Carolina
