= 2010 DFL-Supercup =

- Match programme cover
Bayern Munich	Schalke 04
2	0
- Date: 7 August 2010
- Venue: Impuls Arena, Augsburg
- Referee: Manuel Gräfe (Berlin)
- Attendance: 30,662
- Weather: Clear; 20 °C (68 °F)

The 2010 DFL-Supercup marked the return of the German Supercup, an annual football match contested by the winners of the previous season's Bundesliga and DFB-Pokal competitions. The competition had not been played in an official capacity since 1996, and was replaced by the DFB Liga-Pokal from 1997 to 2007. For the previous two years, an unofficial super cup had been contested.

The match was played at the Impuls Arena in Augsburg on 7 August 2010, and was contested by 2009–10 Bundesliga and 2009–10 DFB-Pokal double winners Bayern Munich, and league runners-up Schalke 04. Bayern won 2–0 with goals from Thomas Müller and Miroslav Klose.

== Teams ==
Team	Qualification	Previous appearances (bold indicates winners)
Bayern Munich	2009–10 Bundesliga champions and 2009–10 DFB-Pokal winners	4 (**1987**, 1989, **1990**, 1994) (Note: Runners-up in the unofficial 2008 German Supercup. Six-time winners and one-time runners-up in the DFL-Ligapokal.)
Schalke 04	2009–10 Bundesliga runners-up	None (Note: One-time winners and three-time runners-up in the DFL-Ligapokal.)

== Match ==
=== Details ===
7 August 2010
17:45 CEST

Bayern Munich	2–0	Schalke 04
Müller 75'; Klose 81'	Report

Impuls Arena, Augsburg
Attendance: 30,662
Referee: Manuel Gräfe (Berlin)

**Bayern Munich**	**Schalke 04**

GK	35	(Germany) Thomas Kraft
RB	21	(Germany) Philipp Lahm (c)
CB	6	(Argentina) Martín Demichelis		(substituted off) 71'
CB	28	(Germany) Holger Badstuber
LB	26	(Germany) Diego Contento
CM	31	(Germany) Bastian Schweinsteiger		(substituted off) 59'
CM	23	(Croatia) Danijel Pranjić
RW	8	(Turkey) Hamit Altıntop		(substituted off) 69'
AM	25	(Germany) Thomas Müller
LW	11	(Croatia) Ivica Olić
CF	18	(Germany) Miroslav Klose
Substitutes:
GK	1	(Germany) Hans-Jörg Butt
MF	16	(Germany) Andreas Ottl	(yellow card) 77'	(substituted on) 59'
MF	20	(Argentina) José Sosa		(substituted on) 71'
MF	44	(Ukraine) Anatoliy Tymoshchuk		(substituted on) 69'
Manager:
(Netherlands) Louis van Gaal

GK	1	(Germany) Manuel Neuer (c)
RB	22	(Japan) Atsuto Uchida
CB	4	(Germany) Benedikt Höwedes
CB	21	(Germany) Christoph Metzelder
LB	13	(Germany) Lukas Schmitz		(substituted off) 46'
CM	12	(Germany) Peer Kluge		(substituted off) 46'
CM	10	(Croatia) Ivan Rakitić
CM	32	(Cameroon) Joël Matip
AM	7	(Spain) Raúl
CF	17	(Peru) Jefferson Farfán
CF	9	(Brazil) Edu
Substitutes:
GK	33	(Germany) Mathias Schober
DF	3	(Spain) Sergio Escudero		(substituted on) 46'
DF	14	(Greece) Kyriakos Papadopoulos
MF	11	(Germany) Alexander Baumjohann
MF	28	(Germany) Christoph Moritz	(yellow card) 87'	(substituted on) 46'
FW	8	(China) Hao Junmin
FW	26	(Slovakia) Erik Jendrišek
Manager:
(Germany) Felix Magath

== See also ==
- 2010–11 Bundesliga
- 2010–11 DFB-Pokal
