= Cassius F. Butts =

American business executive

Cassius F. Butts (born July 10, 1971) is an American business executive, two-time United States Presidential Appointee, author and speaker.

== Early life and education ==
Butts was born in Philadelphia, PA and raised in Orlando, the son of an aerospace engineer and his mother, the owner and operator of a National Association of Family Child Care business. He is a graduate of Morehouse College (BA), Clark Atlanta University (MPA), and obtained a Grant Writing certificate from Emory University's Osher Lifelong Learning Institutes. A graduate of the Atlanta Regional Commission’s Regional Leadership Institute, former South Cobb Economic Development Advisory Council, former Federal Executive Board Committee member and Leadership Atlanta of 2012. He is a member of Sigma Pi Phi fraternity-Kappa Boulé chapter, Kappa Alpha Psi fraternity, the 100 Black Men of Atlanta and H.R. Butler Masonic Lodge #23.

== Career ==
In 2020, Gov. Brian Kemp appointed him to serve on the Georgia Economic Development Board and as a Consumer Advocate for the Georgia Board of Cemeterians. The previous year he was also appointed to serve on the Biden-Harris Transition Team, transition team for Atlanta Mayor Keisha Lance Bottoms along with other executives and CEOs.

In 2022, Butts was appointed co-chair of the newly created General Services Administration Acquisition Policy Federal Advisory Committee. This committee will initially focus on embedding climate and sustainability regulations, policies and processes within federal acquisition.

Butts was invited to serve on the Morehouse College Department of Business & Economics Board of Advisors. He also contributes his time as a Trustee to Morris Brown College and has served on WellStar Health System Institutional Review Board, the National Black MBA Association, the Florida 8a Association and World Affairs Council of Atlanta.

Butts served as an Executive In Residence at the Robinson College of Business within Georgia State University. His contributions helped the college receive the national ranking of the "Second Most Innovative University" by, U.S. News & World Report in 2018.

== Public sector ==
Butts was appointed regional administrator for the United States Small Business Administration (SBA) by President Barack Obama in 2011. He also served as a Presidential Management Fellow under the George W. Bush Administration within the United States Department of Housing & Urban Development (HUD). He assisted in the establishment of HUD’s multi-million marketing procurement process and was named Branch Chief of the Real Estate Owned division during his tenure.

== Private sector ==
Butts served as president & CEO of 1st Choice Credit Union headquartered in Atlanta, Georgia. He is the founder of Capital Fortitude Business Advisors; a boutique management-consulting firm that helps small businesses, NGO's and higher educational entities achieve their bottom line. His firm is also a partner with American Express's "Summit for Success" which provides growth strategies for small to midsize businesses.

In 2023, Butts authored his first book, Exceptional: Being the Exception to the Rules.

Butts also launched a podcast, originally "Talk to Cassius" and now “The Winning Way".
