= Breno (footballer, born 1989) =

Brazilian footballer

Personal information
- Full name: Breno Vinicius Rodrigues Borges
- Date of birth: 13 October 1989 (age 37)
- Place of birth: Cruzeiro, Brazil
- Height: 1.87 m (6 ft 2 in)
- Position: Centre-back

Youth career
- 2003–2007: São Paulo

Senior career*
Years	Team	Apps	(Gls)
2007	São Paulo	29	(2)
2008–2012	Bayern Munich	21	(0)
2010	→ 1. FC Nürnberg (loan)	7	(0)
2015–2017	São Paulo	5	(1)
2017	→ Vasco da Gama (loan)	25	(1)
2018–2020	Vasco da Gama	5	(0)
Total		92	(4)

International career
2008	Brazil U23	8	(0)
Medal record
Representing Brazil
Men's Football
Bronze medal – third place	2008 Beijing	Team competition
- * Club domestic league appearances and goals as of 15 December 2019

Breno Vinicius Rodrigues Borges (Portuguese pronunciation: [ˈbɾɛnu]; born 13 October 1989), known as Breno, is a Brazilian former professional footballer who played as a centre-back.

He was part of the Brazilian squad that won a bronze medal at the 2008 Olympics.

== Personal life ==
Breno was born on 13 October 1989 in Cruzeiro. He married Renata and the couple has a son while his wife has also two children from a previous relationship.

== Club career ==
=== São Paulo ===
Breno was a member of the Brazil under-23 national team. After making their first team, he signed a new four-year contract with São Paulo in July 2007.

=== Bayern Munich ===
In December 2007, Breno officially signed for German Bundesliga side Bayern Munich with a €12 million release clause, signing a four-and-a-half-year deal. Along with Bayern, Real Madrid, Milan, Juventus and Fiorentina were also interested in signing him. Breno, however, refused to sign with Real Madrid after the club wanted a bone analysis to prove his young age.

Breno was recommended to Bayern Munich by one of their former players, Giovane Élber, who was later on recruited as a scout in his native country, Brazil.

Breno played his first competitive match for Bayern against Anderlecht in a 2007–08 UEFA Cup knock-out stage match, an eventual 2–1 defeat.

=== 1. FC Nürnberg ===
After two years and 22 matches played with Bayern Munich, Breno was loaned out to 1. FC Nürnberg on 31 December 2009. On 7 March 2010, he sustained a cruciate ligament injury, ending his season prematurely and also keeping him out of action for most of autumn during Bayern Munich's 2010–11 season.

=== Return to Bayern Munich ===
On 14 November 2010, Breno returned to first team action, playing in the 3–0 home win against his former club 1. FC Nürnberg. Borges has generally served as an understudy to German international Holger Badstuber. On 5 March 2011, he was sent off in the 1–3 away loss to Hannover 96.

=== Return to São Paulo ===
Waiting for a German justice decision, on 20 December 2012 São Paulo registered Breno as a player for its 2013 season. His move to São Paulo was officially confirmed by the Brazilian club on 19 December 2014.

== Arrest ==
On 24 September 2011, Breno was arrested after the Munich public prosecutor had issued an arrest warrant for suspicion of suppression of evidence and the fact that he may be a possible flight risk. The reasoning for the arrest was "suspicion of aggravated arson" in regards to the almost total destruction of his villa in a suspicious fire. The damage to his villa was estimated to be €1.5 million. Bayern Munich made no comment on the arrest. Club officials had previously advised him to seek help from a psychiatrist in regards to injury frustrations, which some feared were career ending. On 6 October 2011, he was released on bail. On 11 April 2012, German prosecutors charged Breno over arson in connection with the fire that burned down his rented villa. On 4 July 2012, Breno was handed a jail sentence of three years and nine months.

After the sentences, the German court announced that Breno will be deported to Brazil upon completion of his prison sentence. Breno's sentences were spoken against by sportspersons like Giovane Élber and Uli Hoeneß, though his comment was criticised by 1. FC Nürnberg director of football Martin Bader and Eintracht Frankfurt executive chairman Heribert Bruchhagen. In January 2013, Breno's proposal for his revised sentence was rejected by the German Federal Court of Justice due to his situation not constituting a formal error of law, after his lawyer says he was under the influence of potentially dangerous medication which could have caused the events which led to his imprisonment.

In May 2013, Breno was used by Bayern Munich club president Karl-Heinz Rummenigge as an example of neglect from Brazilian Football Confederation. For Rummenigge, while the Brazilians struggled for liberation of Dante and Luiz Gustavo to play in the 2013 FIFA Confederations Cup; the defender, on the other hand, was abandoned.

On 19 August 2013, Breno was released from Stadelheim Prison on day release and was employed by former club Bayern Munich as a trainer for its under-23 squad.

== Career statistics ==
As of 15 December 2019.

Appearances and goals by club, season and competition
Club	Season	League			National Cup		Continental		Other		Total	
Club	Season	Division	Apps	Goals	Apps	Goals	Apps	Goals	Apps	Goals	Apps	Goals
São Paulo	2007	Série A	29	2	0	0	6	0	1	0	36	2
Bayern Munich	2007–08	Bundesliga	1	0	0	0	1	0	—		2	0
Bayern Munich	2008–09	Bundesliga	4	0	0	0	5	0	—		9	0
Bayern Munich	2009–10	Bundesliga	3	0	1	0	0	0	—		4	0
Bayern Munich	2010–11	Bundesliga	13	0	2	0	3	0	—		18	0
Bayern Munich	Total		21	0	3	0	9	0	0	0	33	0
1. FC Nürnberg (loan)	2009–10	Bundesliga	7	0	0	0	0	0	—		7	0
São Paulo	2015	Série A	5	1	1	0	0	0	0	0	6	1
São Paulo	2016	Série A	0	0	0	0	1	0	1	0	2	0
São Paulo	2017	Série A	0	0	2	0	1	0	2	0	5	0
São Paulo	Total		5	1	3	0	2	0	3	0	13	1
Vasco da Gama (loan)	2017	Série A	25	1	—		—		—		25	1
Vasco da Gama	2018	Série A	5	0	1	0	2	0	—		8	0
Vasco da Gama	2019	Série A	0	0	—		—		—		0	0
Vasco da Gama	Total	Série A	30	1	1	0	2	0	0	0	33	1
Career total			92	4	7	0	19	0	4	0	122	4

== Honours ==
=== Club ===
São Paulo

- Brazilian League: 2007

Bayern Munich

- DFB-Pokal: 2007–08
- Bundesliga: 2007–08

=== International ===
- 2008 Summer Olympics: Bronze medal winner

=== Individual ===
- Campeonato Brasileiro Série A Team of the Year: 2007
- Bola de Prata: 2007
