= Wanda Butts =

American activist

Wanda Butts is a United States activist who leads a nonprofit organization that teaches minority children how to swim. She was named one of the top 10 CNN Heroes in 2012.

== Life ==
Butts had a fear of water since she was a child. She lost her 16-year-old son to a drowning accident in 2006, when he was rafting with friends on a lake and did not wear a life jacket. Her son did not know how to swim. After this tragedy, Butts was determined to begin activism so other children would not suffer the same fate. Butts now works for the city of Toledo, Ohio full-time, while running her nonprofit organization part-time.

== Activism ==
After her son's death, Butts founded the nonprofit organization the Josh Project in 2007 in Toledo, Ohio. She partnered with the USA Swimming Foundation's Make-A-Splash initiative to help with her organization, who in turn connected her with her local swimming organization, the Greater Toledo Aquatic Club. The Josh Project provides low-cost swimming lessons for children, and the first swimming safety session for children was held in March 2007. As of 2016, the organization has helped over 1,300 children learn how to swim. The organization primarily helps minority children, as they are at a significantly higher risk of drowning in the United States. Most of the children who learn to swim are the first in their family to do so. Volunteers that are certified lead the classes at a local high school. Children can continue in the program for as long as they choose. She also performs speaking engagements. Her organization model has expanded to create similar organizations in other locations such as Norfolk, Virginia. Butts hopes to expand her organization by training more instructors and gaining their own facility.

== Awards ==
Butts was named a CNN Hero in 2012. She was named one of The Grio's 100 in 2013.
