= James Butts =

James Butts may refer to:

- James Butts (triple jumper) (born 1950), American triple jumper
- James T. Butts Jr. (born 1953), American politician and retired police chief
