= Robert Butts =

Robert Butts may refer to:

- Robert Hamilton Butts (1871–1943), Canadian politician, barrister and lawyer
- Robert Butts (bishop) (1684–1748), English churchman and bishop
- Robert Earl Butts (1977–2018), American convicted murderer
