= John Butts =

John Butts may refer to:

- John Butts (painter), Irish landscape painter
- John E. Butts (1922–1944), Medal of Honor recipient
- John L. Butts Jr. (1920–1992), U.S. Navy rear admiral and Navy Cross recipient
- John L. Butts (1929–2011), U.S. Navy rear admiral and former director of the Office of Naval Intelligence

== See also ==
- John Butt (disambiguation)
