= Álvaro Martínez =

Álvaro Martínez may refer to:

- Álvaro Martínez (footballer, born 1974), Spanish retired football goalkeeper
- Álvaro Martínez (footballer, born 1979), Spanish retired football defender
- Álvaro Martínez (politician), politician in Argentina
