= 2015–16 FC Bayern Munich season =

117th season in existence of Bayern Munich

Bayern Munich
2015–16 season
- Sporting director: Matthias Sammer
- President: Karl Hopfner
- Manager: Pep Guardiola
- Stadium: Allianz Arena
- Bundesliga: 1st
- DFB-Pokal: Winners
- DFL-Supercup: Runners-up
- UEFA Champions League: Semi-finals
- Top goalscorer: League: Robert Lewandowski (30); All: Robert Lewandowski (42)
- Highest home attendance: 75,000
- Lowest home attendance: 75,000
- Average home league attendance: 75,000
- Biggest win: Bayern Munich 5–0 Hamburger SV; Bayern Munich 5–0 Werder Bremen; Bayern Munich 5–0 Dinamo Zagreb
- Biggest defeat: Borussia Mönchengladbach 3–1 Bayern Munich; Arsenal 2–0 Bayern Munich
Home colours	Away colours	Third colours
- All statistics correct as of 21 May 2016.

The 2015–16 season was the 117th in the history of FC Bayern Munich. The season was the first since 2001–02 without Bastian Schweinsteiger, who departed to Manchester United in the summer of 2015.

== Background ==
=== Background information ===
Bayern won their third consecutive (25th overall) Bundesliga championship in the 2014–15 season. Bayern also won the DFB-Pokal by beating Borussia Dortmund but were knocked out of Champions League in the semifinals by Barcelona. and Dortmund defeated Bayern in the German Super Cup. Pep Guardiola didn't extend his contract and Carlo Ancelotti will replace him for the 2016–17 season.

=== Pre-season ===
==== Pre-season overview ====
Pre-season started on 1 July. It was confirmed that Bayern, Borussia Mönchengladbach, Hamburger SV and FC Augsburg will participate in the 2015 Telekom Cup on 12 July at Borussia-Park in Mönchengladbach. Bayern finished fourth in the tournament after losing to FC Augsburg in the semi-final and losing to Borussia Mönchengladbach in a shootout in the third place match. Then Bayern will have an eight-day tour in China. They will have the "Audi Summer Tour" in China. The tour will be held in Beijing, Shanghai, and Guangzhou. The first match was held on 18 July in Beijing against Valencia, which Bayern won 4–1. The second match took place on 21 July in Shanghai against Inter Milan, which Bayern won 1–0. The final match took place on 23 July in Guanghzou against Guangzhou Evergrande, which Bayern lost in a shootout. Three days after their first competitive match, Bayern played in the Audi Cup against Real Madrid, Milan, and Tottenham Hotspur. Bayern's semifinal opponent was Milan. Bayern won the match 3–0 on 4 August. Joshua Kimmich came off after 20 minutes after a foul from Nigel de Jong. Guardiola was upset with the foul. Guardiola and De Jong were in a "shouting match in the tunnel." Real Madrid defeated Tottenham prior to Bayern's match to set up the final against Bayern. The following day, Bayern won the final 1–0. Bayern faced Dynamo Dresden in a friendly match on 17 August which Bayern won 3–1. Bayern will face Red Power fan club in the Dream Game in Deggendorf on 30 August.

==== Pre-season friendly matches ====
Date	H/A/N	Opponent	Res. F–A	Goalscorers and disciplined players		Ref.
Date	H/A/N	Opponent	Res. F–A	Bayern Munich	Opponent	Ref.
18 July	N	Valencia	4–1	Müller 16', 45+1'; Thiago 54'; Lewandowski 69'	Rodrigo 27'	
21 July	N	Inter Milan	1–0	Götze 80'	—	
23 July	A	Guangzhou Evergrande	0–0 (4–5 p)	Rafinha (yellow card) 39'	—	
23 July	A	Guangzhou Evergrande	0–0 (4–5 p)	Penalties		
23 July	A	Guangzhou Evergrande	0–0 (4–5 p)	Müller (penalty missed); Alonso (penalty scored); Boateng (penalty scored); Douglas Costa (penalty scored); Thiago (penalty scored)	(penalty scored) Paulinho; (penalty scored) Kim Young-gwon; (penalty scored) Yu Hanchao; (penalty scored) Zhao Xuri; (penalty scored) Feng Xiaoting	

==== Pre-season tournaments ====
Rd	Date Kick–off	Venue	Opponent	Res. F–A	Goalscorers and disciplined players		Ref.
Rd	Date Kick–off	Venue	Opponent	Res. F–A	Bayern Munich	Opponent	Ref.
Telekom Cup
SF	12 July	A	FC Augsburg	1–2	Thiago 7'	Esswein 29'; Hong 35'	
TP	12 July	A	Borussia Mönchengladbach	0–0 (3–4 p)	—	Ritter (yellow card) 20'	
TP	12 July	A	Borussia Mönchengladbach	0–0 (3–4 p)	Penalties		
TP	12 July	A	Borussia Mönchengladbach	0–0 (3–4 p)	Alaba (penalty scored); Lahm (penalty scored); Kimmich (penalty scored); Højbjerg (penalty missed); Benko (penalty missed)	(penalty scored) Stindl; (penalty scored) Ndenge; (penalty scored) Dahoud; (penalty scored) Brouwers	
Audi Cup
SF	4 August	H	Milan	3–0	Bernat 24'; Götze 74'; Lewandowski 85'	—	
F	5 August	H	Real Madrid	1–0	Alonso (yellow card) 36'; Benatia (yellow card) 50'; Lewandowski 88'	Marcelo (yellow card) 33'; Ramos (yellow card) 71'	

=== Transfers ===
Joshua Kimmich, Sven Ulreich, Douglas Costa, and Arturo Vidal transferred to Bayern. Pierre-Emile Højbjerg, Jan Kirchhoff, and Julian Green returned to Bayern after loan spells at other clubs. Højbjerg was later loaned out to Schalke 04. Kingsley Coman was loaned in for two years from Juventus. Bayern can make the loan permanent. Mitchell Weiser and Claudio Pizarro left Bayern after their contracts expired. Pepe Reina left Bayern after he asked for his release. Rico Strieder, who made his professional debut with Bayern during the 2014–15 season, was sold to Utrecht. Bayern announced on 11 July that they have agreed to the terms of a transfer with Manchester United over Bastian Schweinsteiger. The deal was completed on 13 July. He had been at Bayern for 17 years. Dante was sold to VfL Wolfsburg. Memphis Depay stated that he turned down Bayern to join Manchester United. During mid–winter training, Bayern sold Sinan Kurt and Jan Kirchhoff and loaned out Gianluca Gaudino. On 1 February, Bayern loaned in Serdar Tasci for the remainder of the season.

== Mid-season training ==
=== Mid-season training overview ===
Bayern came back from the Christmas break on 4 January and will have a mid–season training camp in Qatar from 6 January to 12 January. Bayern sold Sinan Kurt and Jan Kirchhoff and loaned out Gianluca Gaudino. In their only match during the mid–season training, Bayern lost 2–1 to Karlsruher SC. Jérôme Boateng was sent–off in the match.

=== Mid-season friendlies ===
Date	H/A/N	Opponent	Res. F–A	Goalscorers and disciplined players		Ref.
Date	H/A/N	Opponent	Res. F–A	Bayern Munich	Opponent	Ref.
17 August	A	Dynamo Dresden	3–1	Robben 17'; Vidal 48'; Bernat 74'	Testroet 86'	
30 August	A	Fanclub Red Power	5–0	Green 10'; Weihrauch 32', 38'; Gaudino 48' (yellow card) 52'; Rode 88'	—	
3 September	A	Jahn Regensburg	1–3	Scholl 31'	Pusch 35'; George 40'; Ziereis 43'	
9 November	A	Paulaner Traumelf	6–1	Lahm 16'; Weihrauch 28', 37'; Lappe 39'; Reimann 56' (o.g.); Scholl 78'	Maier 75' (pen.)	
16 January	A	Karlsruher SC	1–2	Vidal 21'; Boateng (red card) 73'; Friedl (yellow card) 80'	Barry 16'; Nazarov 74'	

== Bundesliga ==
=== Bundesliga review ===
==== August ====
Bayern opened their Bundesliga season with three wins in August against Hamburger SV, 1899 Hoffenheim and Bayer Leverkusen. On 14 August, which was the opening fixture of the league season, Bayern won 5–0 with two goals from Thomas Müller and a goal each from Medhi Benatia, Robert Lewandowski and Douglas Costa. Bayern were in first place after the matchday was completed. The second match, on 22 August, was a 2–1 win against 1899 Hoffenheim. Thomas Müller and Robert Lewandowski scored for Bayern and Kevin Volland scored for Hoffenheim, which was scored in record time. The goal was scored after nine seconds which equaled Karim Bellarabi. Jérôme Boateng was sent off after receiving a second yellow card. Eugen Polanski miss the subsequent penalty shot. Bayern finished the matchday in second place. The third match, on 29 August, was a 3–0 win against Bayer Leverkusen. Thomas Müller, who played in his 200th Bundesliga match, scored two goals, one from the penalty spot, and another goal from the penalty spot by Arjen Robben. Boateng was suspended for the match. Bayern finished the matchday in second place.

==== September ====
Bayern extended their winning streak to seven wins from seven league matches when they defeated FC Augsburg, Darmstadt 98, VfL Wolfsburg and Mainz 05. The fourth win came in a 2–1 win against Augsburg on 12 September. Alexander Esswein gave Augsburg the lead in 43rd minute. Robert Lewandwski equalized in the 77th minute and Thomas Müller gave Bayern all three points when he scored from the penalty spot after Markus Feulner was called for a foul on Douglas Costa. The following day, Knut Kircher, who refereed the match, stated that he relied on his assistant referee and the decision was incorrect. Kingsley Coman made his debut for Bayern. Bayern finished the matchday in second place. In the fifth win, on 19 September, Bayern defeated Darmstadt 98 3–0 with goals from Arturo Vidal, Kingsley Coman and Sebastian Rode. Coman got his first start and first goal for Bayern. Vidal got his first league goal and second in all competitions. Bayern remained in second place. The sixth win came in a 5–1 win against Wolfsburg on 22 September. Daniel Caligiuri gave Wolfsburg the lead in the 26th minute. Lewandowski, however, scored five goals in nine minutes. Lewandowski came on in the 46th minute and scored in the 51st, 52nd, 55th, 57th, and 60th minutes. He became the fastest player to score five goals. Bayern finished the matchday in first place. The seventh win came in a 3–0 win against Mainz 05 on 25 September. Bayern got two goals from Lewandowski and a goal from Coman. Bayern finished the matchday in first place.

==== October ====
Bayern extended their winning streak to ten wins when they defeated Borussia Dortmund, Werder Bremen, and 1. FC Köln. The winning streak finished against Eintracht Frankfurt. The "European major league record" for the best start to a season was Tottenham Hotspur with 11-straight wins in 1960. In their eighth straight win on 4 October, Bayern defeated Borussia Dortmund 5–1. Bayern got two goals from Thomas Müller, including one from the penalty mark, and two from Robert Lewandowski, which brought his total to 12 goals in his last four matches in all competitions, and a goal from Mario Götze. Bayern finished the matchday in first place. In their ninth victory, on 17 October, Bayern defeated Werder Bremen 1–0 with a goal from Thomas Müller. Miloš Pantović made his Bundesliga debut in the match. Bayern remained in first place. Then, on 24 October, Bayern got their 10th win out of 10 league matches, and their 1,000th Bundesliga win, when they defeated Köln 4–0. Arjen Robben, Arturo Vidal, Robert Lewandowski, and Thomas Müller scored for Bayern. Bayern remained in first place. On 30 October, Bayern's ten–match winning streak finished when the match against Eintracht Frankfurt finished in a 0–0 draw. During the match, Bayern received two yellow cards and Eintracht Frankfurt received four. Bayern had won their previous six matches against Eintracht Frankfurt. Bayern finished the matchday in first place.

==== November ====
In November, Bayern extended their undefeated streak to 14 matches after defeating VfB Stuttgart Schalke 04, and Hertha BSC. On 7 November, Bayern extended their undefeated streak to 12 matches after their defeated VfB Stuttgart 4–0 with goals from Arjen Robben, Douglas Costa, Robert Lewandowski, and Thomas Müller. Holger Badstuber made his comeback after he came in for Müller in the 59th minute. He had been out for 200 days. Bayern remained in first place. Bayern extended their undefeated streak to 13 matches on 21 November after defeating Schalke 04 3–1. Bayern got goals from an own goal from Leon Goretzka and goals from Javi Martínez and Thomas Müller. Max Meyer scored for Schalke. Bayern remained in first place and extended their lead to eight points after Borussia Dortmund lost the previous day. Bayern extended their undefeated streak to 14 matches after a 2–0 win against Hertha BSC. Bayern got goals from Thomas Müller and Kingsley Coman. Bayern remained in first place.

==== December ====
On 5 December, Bayern's undefeated streak came to an end after Borussia Mönchengladbach defeated Bayern 3–1. Bayern had 13 wins and a draw coming into the match. Franck Ribéry scored for Bayern. Oscar Wendt, Lars Stindl, and Fabian Johnson scored for Borussia Mönchengladbach. All three of their goals came within a 14-minute period. This was Ribéry's first match since March 2015. Bayern remained in first place. However, Bayern's lead dropped to five points after Borussia Dortmund defeated Wolfsburg later in the day. Bayern defeated FC Ingolstadt 2–0 with goals from Robert Lewandowski and Philipp Lahm on 12 December. Lewandowski scored in the 65th minute from a tight angle and Lahm scored his first goal of the season in the 75th minute. Ingolstadt have several chances to score. Ingolstadt were offside six times and Manuel Neuer had to make several saves during the match. Bayern became "autumn champions" after finishing the matchday in first place. On 19 December, Bayern went on winter break after defeating Hannover 96 1–0 with a goal from the penalty mark from Thomas Müller. Bayern Munich finishedthe matchday in first place and the first half of the league season with 15 wins, 1 draw and 1 loss. Bayern increased their lead to eight points after Köln defeated Borussia Dortmund on the same day.

==== January ====
On 22 January, Bayern kicked off the second half of the league season with a 2–1 win over Hamburg. Robert Lewandowski scored two goals and Xabi Alonso scored an own goal. Bayern remained in first place. Then on 31 January, Bayern defeated 1899 Hoffenheim 2–0 with two goals from Robert Lewandowski. With the win, Bayern maintained their perfect home record and their first place status. The following day, Bayern agreed to a loan deal for Serdar Tasci.

==== February ====
Bayern started February with a 0–0 draw on 6 February. The draw ended a four match winning streak and was the third time in 20 league matches Bayern failed to win. Xabi Alonso was sent–off after receiving a second yellow card. Bayern remained in first place. Then, on 14 February, Bayern defeated FC Augsburg 3–1. Bayern got two goals from Robert Lewandowski and a goal from Thomas Müller and Raúl Bobadilla scored for Augsburg. Bayern remained in first place. Bayern went on to beat Darmstadt 98 3–1 on 20 February. Bayern got two goals from Thomas Müller and a goal from Robert Lewandowski and Sandro Wagner scored for Darmstadt. Bayern outshot Darmstadt 37 to six. Bayern remained in first place. On 27 February, Bayern finished February by defeating Wolfsburg 2–0 with goals from Kingsley Coman and Robert Lewandowski. Lewandowski had scored six goals against Wolfsburg this season. In addition to scoring a goal in this match, he scored five goals on 22 September. However, Lewandowski failed to score against Wolfsburg in the German Cup. Bayern finished the matchday in first place.

==== March ====
Bayern started March on 2 March by losing their first home match of the season. They had been undefeated in 17 matches in all competitions this season. The final score was 2–1. Arjen Robben scored for Bayern. Jairo and Jhon Córdoba scored for Mainz. Bayern remained in first place. However, Bayern's lead dropped down to five points after Borussia Dortmund defeated Darmstadt 2–0. On 5 March, Bayern and Borussia Dortmund finished in a 0–0 draw. Xabi Alonso and Sven Bender picked up yellow cards. Bayern remained in first place and maintain their five points lead of Borussia Dortmund. On 12 March, Bayern defeated Werder Bremen 5–0 with two goals from Thiago, two goals from Thomas Müller, and a goal from Robert Lewandowski. Bayern remained in first place. On 19 March, Bayern defeated 1. FC Köln 1–0 with a goal from Robert Lewandowski. Lewandowski scored his 25th league goal. This is the most league goals he has scored in his career. Pep Guardiola made five changes to the starting lineup from the midweek encounter against Juventus. Bayern finished the matchday in first place.

==== April ====
Bayern started April with a 1–0 win against Eintracht Frankfurt on 2 April. Franck Ribéry got the goal, of the month, in the 20th minute. Bayern outshot Eintracht Frankfurt 21–4. Bayern finished the matchday in first place. On 9 April, Bayern defeated VfB Stuttgart 3–1. Bayern got goals from an own goal from Georg Niedermeier and goals from David Alaba and Douglas Costa and Stuttgart got their goal from Daniel Didavi. Bayern remained in first place. Bayern took a seven-point lead after Borussia Dortmund and Schalke finished their match in a 2–2 draw. On 16 April, Bayern defeated Schalke 3–0 with two goals from Robert Lewandowski and a goal from Arturo Vidal. Bayern remained in first place. Then, on 23 April, Bayern defeat Hertha BSC 2–0 with goals from Arturo Vidal and Douglas Costa. Bayern finished the matchday in first place. Bayern finished April on 30 April when the match against Borussia Mönchengladbach finished in a 1–1 draw. Thomas Müller scored for Bayern and André Hahn scored for Borussia Mönchengladbach. Bayern finished the matchday in first place.

==== May ====
Bayern won the Bundesliga on 7 May after defeating Ingolstadt 2–1. Bayern got two goals from Robert Lewandowski and Ingolstadt got a goal from the penalty spot from Moritz Hartmann. This is Bayern's fourth straight and 26th championship overall, making it a new record in the Bundesliga. Bayern finished the league season on 14 May with a 3–1 win against Hannover 96. Bayern got two goals from Mario Götze and a goal from Robert Lewandowski. Lewandowski became the first player in 39 years to score at least 30 goals in a Bundesliga season. Artur Sobiech scored for Hannover. Bayern finished the season with a record 28 wins, four draws, two losses, and 88 points.

=== Bundesliga table ===
Pos	Team	Pld	W	D	L	GF	GA	GD	Pts	Qualification or relegation
1	Bayern Munich (C)	34	28	4	2	80	17	+63	88	Qualification for the Champions League group stage
2	Borussia Dortmund	34	24	6	4	82	34	+48	78	Qualification for the Champions League group stage
3	Bayer Leverkusen	34	18	6	10	56	40	+16	60	Qualification for the Champions League group stage
4	Borussia Mönchengladbach	34	17	4	13	67	50	+17	55	Qualification for the Champions League play-off round
5	Schalke 04	34	15	7	12	51	49	+2	52	Qualification for the Europa League group stage (Note: Since the winners of the 2015–16 DFB-Pokal, Bayern Munich, qualified for the Champions League based on league position, the Europa League group stage spot was passed to the sixth-placed team, Mainz 05; and the Europa League third qualifying round spot was passed to the seventh-placed team, Hertha BSC.)

Source: DFB
Rules for classification: 1) Points; 2) Goal difference; 3) Goals scored; 4) Head-to-head points; 5) Head-to-head goal difference; 6) Head-to-head away goals scored; 7) Away goals scored; 8) Play-offs.
(C) Champions

=== Results summary ===
Overall								Home						Away					
Pld	W	D	L	GF	GA	GD	Pts	W	D	L	GF	GA	GD	W	D	L	GF	GA	GD
34	28	4	2	80	17	+63	88	15	1	1	51	8	+43	13	3	1	29	9	+20

Last updated: 14 May 2016.
Source: Bundesliga

=== Bundesliga fixtures and results ===
MD	Date	H/A	Opponent	Res. F–A	Att.	Goalscorers and disciplined players		Table		Ref.
MD	Date	H/A	Opponent	Res. F–A	Att.	Bayern Munich	Opponent	Pos.	Pts.	Ref.
1	14 August	H	Hamburger SV	5–0	75,000	Alonso (yellow card) 12'; Boateng (yellow card) 18'; Benatia 27'; Lewandowski 53'; Müller 69', 73'; Douglas Costa 87'	Diekmeier (yellow card) 25'; Spahić (yellow card) 36'	1	3	
2	22 August	A	1899 Hoffenheim	2–1	30,150	Müller 41' (yellow card) 75'; Boateng (yellow card) 71' (yellow-red card) 73'; Rafinha (yellow card) 83'; Lewandowski 90'	Volland 1'; Schwegler (yellow card) 63'; Kim (yellow card) 77'; Polanski (yellow card) 89'	2	6	
3	29 August	H	Bayer Leverkusen	3–0	75,000	Bernat (yellow card) 8'; Thiago (yellow card) 19'; Müller 26', 60' (pen.); Robben 71' (pen.)	Wendell (yellow card) 6'; Kramer (yellow card) 18'; Kruse (yellow card) 72'	2	9	
4	12 September	H	FC Augsburg	2–1	75,000	Lewandowski 77'; Müller 90' (pen.)	Esswein 43'	2	12	
5	19 September	A	Darmstadt 98	3–0	17,000	Vidal 20'; Coman 62'; Rode 63'; Martínez (yellow card) 80'	Wagner (yellow card) 73'; Sulu (yellow card) 78'	2	15	
6	22 September	H	VfL Wolfsburg	5–1	75,000	Lewandowski 51', 52', 55', 57', 60'; Vidal (yellow card) 82'	Caligiuri 26' (yellow card) 42'; R. Rodríguez (yellow card) 74'	1	18	
7	26 September	A	Mainz 05	3–0	34,000	Alonso (yellow card) 27'; Lewandowski 51', 63'; Coman 68'	Baumgartlinger (yellow card) 28'	1	21	
8	4 October	H	Borussia Dortmund	5–1	75,000	Alaba (yellow card) 4'; Müller 26', 35' (pen.); Lewandowski 46', 58'; Götze 66'; Boateng (yellow card) 78'; Kimmich (yellow card) 83'	Aubameyang 36' (yellow card) 80'	1	24	
9	17 October	A	Werder Bremen	1–0	42,100	Müller 23'; Rafinha (yellow card) 42'; Kimmich (yellow card) 82'	S. García (yellow card) 60'; Bargfrede (yellow card) 80'	1	27	
10	24 October	H	1. FC Köln	4–0	75,000	Robben 35'; Vidal 40'; Rafinha (yellow card) 55'; Lewandowski 62'; Müller 77' (pen.)	Lehmann (yellow card) 61'	1	30	
11	30 October	A	Eintracht Frankfurt	0–0	51,500	Lahm (yellow card) 69'; Robben (yellow card) 85'	Aigner (yellow card) 1'; Seferovic (yellow card) 57'; Abraham (yellow card) 83'; Ignjovski (yellow card) 90+5'	1	31	
12	7 November	H	VfB Stuttgart	4–0	75,000	Robben 11'; Douglas Costa 18'; Lewandowski 37'; Müller 40'	—	1	34	
13	21 November	A	Schalke 04	3–1	62,271	Goretzka 9' (o.g.); Martínez 69'; Müller 90+2'	Meyer 17'; Huntelaar (yellow card) 61'; Højbjerg (yellow card) 82'	1	37	
14	28 November	H	Hertha BSC	2–0	75,000	Müller 34'; Coman 41'	Langkamp (yellow card) 15'; Skjelbred (yellow card) 24'; Ibišević (yellow card) 48'	1	40	
15	5 December	A	Borussia Mönchengladbach	1–3	54,010	Benatia (yellow card) 4'; Ribéry 81'; Rafinha (yellow card) 86'	Wendt 54'; Stindl 66' (yellow card) 74'; Johnson 68'	1	40	
16	12 December	H	FC Ingolstadt	2–0	75,000	Boateng (yellow card) 55'; Lewandowski 65'; Lahm 75'; Martínez (yellow card) 89'	Levels (yellow card) 56'	1	43	
17	19 December	A	Hannover 96	1–0	49,000	Müller 42' (pen.)	—	1	46	
18	22 January	A	Hamburger SV	2–1	57,000	Lewandowski 37' (pen.), 61'; Lahm (yellow card) 45'; Alonso (yellow card) 82'	Ostrzolek (yellow card) 20'; Kačar (yellow card) 32'; Adler (yellow card) 36'; Müller (yellow card) 42'; Alonso 53' (o.g.)	1	49	
19	31 January	H	1899 Hoffenheim	2–0	75,000	Douglas Costa (yellow card) 29'; Lewandowski 32', 64'	Strobl (yellow card) 29'	1	52	
20	6 February	A	Bayer Leverkusen	0–0	30,210	Alonso (yellow card) 78' (yellow-red card) 84'	—	1	53	
21	14 February	A	FC Augsburg	3–1	30,660	Lewandowski 15', 62'; Müller (yellow card) 72' (goal) 78'	Bobadilla 86'	1	56	
22	20 February	H	Darmstadt 98	3–1	75,000	Rafinha (yellow card) 38'; Müller 49', 71'; Kimmich (yellow card) 50'; Lewandowski 84'	Wagner 26'	1	59	
23	27 February	A	VfL Wolfsburg	2–0	30,000	Coman 66'; Lewandowski 74'; Bernat (yellow card) 78'	—	1	62	
24	2 March	H	Mainz 05	1–2	75,000	Rafinha (yellow card) 50'; Robben 64'	Jairo 26'; Balogun (yellow card) 62'; Bussmann (yellow card) 84'; Córdoba 86'	1	62	
25	5 March	A	Borussia Dortmund	0–0	81,359	Alonso (yellow card) 22'	Bender (yellow card) 37'	1	63	
26	12 March	H	Werder Bremen	5–0	75,000	Thiago 9', 90'; Müller 31', 35'; Ribéry (yellow card) 35'; Lewandowski 86'	Gebre Selassie (yellow card) 25'; Djilobodji (yellow card) 67'; U. Garcia (yellow card) 83'	1	66	
27	19 March	A	1. FC Köln	1–0	50,000	Lewandowski 10'; Lahm (yellow card) 86'	Sørensen (yellow card) 89'	1	69	
28	2 April	H	Eintracht Frankfurt	1–0	75,000	Ribéry 20'; Lewandowski (yellow card) 41'; Götze (yellow card) 55'	Abraham (yellow card) 41'; Ben-Hatira (yellow card) 45'; Chandler (yellow card) 49'; Stendera (yellow card) 51'; Castaignos (yellow card) 90+4'	1	72	
29	9 April	A	VfB Stuttgart	3–1	60,000	Vidal (yellow card) 22'; Niedermeier 31' (o.g.); Alonso (yellow card) 37'; Alaba 52' (yellow card) 60'; Douglas Costa 89'	Didavi (yellow card) 45' (goal) 63'	1	75	
30	16 April	H	Schalke 04	3–0	75,000	Lewandowski 54', 65'; Vidal 73'	—	1	78	
31	23 April	A	Hertha BSC	2–0	76,233	Rafinha (yellow card) 37'; Müller (yellow card) 41'; Vidal 48' (yellow card) 52'; Thiago (yellow card) 77'; Douglas Costa 79'	—	1	81	
32	30 April	H	Borussia Mönchengladbach	1–1	75,000	Müller 6'; Tasci (yellow card) 18'; Rode (yellow card) 22'	Hahn 72'; Elvedi (yellow card) 77'	1	82	
33	7 May	A	FC Ingolstadt	2–1	15,000	Lewandowski 15' (pen.), 32'; (yellow card) 80'; Benatia (yellow card) 46'; Müller (yellow card) 75'	Hartmann 42' (pen.); Lex (yellow card) 83'; Leckie (yellow card) 89'	1	85	
34	14 May	H	Hannover 96	3–1	75,000	Lewandowski 12'; Götze 28', 54'	Klaus (yellow card) 56'; Sobiech 66'	1	88	

== DFB-Pokal ==
=== DFB-Pokal review ===
On 10 June, Bayern were drawn against Oberliga club FC Nöttingen as their first round opponents in the DFB-Pokal. The match was played on 9 August. Bayern won the match 3–1. Arturo Vidal, Mario Götze, and Robert Lewandowski scored for Bayern. Vidal scored from the penalty mark. Niklas Hecht-Zirpel scored for Nöttingen. On 14 August, Bayern were drawn against Wolfsburg. The match took place on 27 October. Bayern won 3–1. Bayern got two goals from Thomas Müller and a goal from Douglas Costa. On 1 November, Bayern were drawn against Darmstadt 98. The match took place on 15 December where Bayern defeated 1–0 with a goal from Xabi Alonso, who scored his first goal of the season in the 40th minute from 30 metres (33 yd) out. Then, on 16 December, Bayern were drawn against VfL Bochum. The match took place on 10 February. Bayern won 3–0, with two goals from Robert Lewandowski and a goal from Thiago. Jan Šimůnek was sent–off in the match. Thomas Müller failed to score on the subsequent penalty shot. Immediately after the match, Bayern were drawn against Werder Bremen. The match took place on 19 April. Bayern got to the final after winning the match 2–0 with two goals from Thomas Müller. The final took place on 21 May. Bayern won the DFB-Pokal after winning the shootout 4–3. The match finished in a 0–0 draw. In the shootout, Borussia Dortmund goalkeeper Roman Bürki saved Joshua Kimmich's shot. Manuel Neuer saved Sven Bender's shot and Sokratis Papastathopoulos hit the outside of the post during the shootout. This was Pep Guardiola's final match as Bayern's head coach.

=== DFB-Pokal fixtures and results ===
Rd	Date	H/A	Opponent	Res. F–A	Att.	Goalscorers and disciplined players		Ref.
Rd	Date	H/A	Opponent	Res. F–A	Att.	Bayern Munich	Opponent	Ref.
1	9 August	A	FC Nöttingen	3–1	29,486	Vidal 5' (pen.) (yellow card) 6'; Götze 17'; Lewandowski 26'; Boateng (yellow card) 60'; Bernat (yellow card) 75'	Hecht-Zirpel 16'; Zachmann (yellow card) 76'	
2	27 October	A	VfL Wolfsburg	3–1	30,000	Douglas Costa 15'; Coman (yellow card) 19'; Müller 20', 34'; Alonso (yellow card) 53'	Naldo (yellow card) 62'; Dante (yellow card) 77'; Schürrle 90'	
R16	15 December	H	Darmstadt 98	1–0	72,500	Rafinha (yellow card) 9'; Alonso 40'	—	
QF	10 February	A	VfL Bochum	3–0	28,000	Lewandowski 39', 90'; Thiago 61'	Šimůnek (red card) 44'; Fabian (yellow card) 56'	
SF	19 April	H	Werder Bremen	2–0	75,000	Müller 30', 71' (pen.)	Fritz (yellow card) 24'	
F	21 May	N	Borussia Dortmund	0–0 (a.e.t.) (4–3 p)	74,322	Ribéry (yellow card) 39'; Kimmich (yellow card) 42'; Vidal (yellow card) 47'; Müller (yellow card) 109'	Castro (yellow card) 39'; Hummels (yellow card) 74'; Sokratis (yellow card) 99'	
F	21 May	N	Borussia Dortmund	0–0 (a.e.t.) (4–3 p)	74,322	Penalties		
F	21 May	N	Borussia Dortmund	0–0 (a.e.t.) (4–3 p)	74,322	Vidal (penalty scored); Lewandowski (penalty scored); Kimmich (penalty missed); Müller (penalty scored); Douglas Costa (penalty scored)	(penalty scored) Kagawa; (penalty missed) Bender; (penalty missed) Sokratis; (penalty scored) Aubameyang; (penalty scored) Reus	

== DFL-Supercup ==
=== DFL-Supercup review ===
The opening match of Bayern's season was on 1 August against VfL Wolfsburg in the DFL–Supercup. Bayern and Wolfsburg finished in a 1–1 draw after 90 minutes with Wolfsburg winning the subsequent shootout. Arjen Robben scored for Bayern and Nicklas Bendtner scored for Wolfsburg. Xabi Alonso was the only player that missed in the shootout. Arturo Vidal and Douglas Costa made their Bayern debuts.

=== DFL-Supercup result ===
Date	H/A	Res. F–A	Goalscorers and disciplined players		Ref.
Date	H/A	Res. F–A	Bayern Munich	VfL Wolfsburg	Ref.
1 August	A	1–1 (4–5 p)	Douglas Costa (yellow card) 21'; Robben 49'; Vidal (yellow card) 82'	Guilavogui (yellow card) 35'; Naldo (yellow card) 71'; Perišić (yellow card) 77'; Bendtner 89'	
1 August	A	1–1 (4–5 p)	Shootout		
1 August	A	1–1 (4–5 p)	Vidal (penalty scored); Alonso (penalty missed); Robben (penalty scored); Lahm (penalty scored); Douglas Costa (penalty scored)	(penalty scored) Rodríguez; (penalty scored) De Bruyne; (penalty scored) Schürrle; (penalty scored) Kruse; (penalty scored) Bendtner	

== UEFA Champions League ==
=== Champions League review ===
==== Group stage review ====
As champions, Bayern entered Champions League in the group stage. On 27 August, in the group stage draw, Bayern were drawn against Arsenal, Olympiacos, and Dinamo Zagreb. The first match took place on 16 September against Olympiacos. This was Bayern's 200th Champions League match and their first match in Greece since 1983. Bayern defeated Olympiacos 3–0 with two goals from Thomas Müller and a goal from Mario Götze. Müller's first goal was "looped" into the net from a cross. His second goal came from the penalty spot in stoppage time after Kingsley Coman was fouled. Bayern finished the matchday in first place. Before the match, the police in Athens were in an altercation with Bayern supporters where batons were used. Several Bayern supporters went to the hospital and had left the hospital by the following day. Bayern have lodged an appeal against the incident. Then Bayern faced Dinamo Zagreb on 29 September. Bayern won the match 5–0 with three goals from Robert Lewandowski and a goal each from Douglas Costa and Mario Götze. Lewandowski's three goals brought him up to 10 goals in his last three matches in all competitions. Bayern finished the matchday in first place. Bayern faced Arsenal on 20 October. Arsenal won the match 2–0 with goals from Olivier Giroud and Mesut Özil. This was Bayern's first loss of the season in all competitions. Bayern remained in first place. On 4 November, Bayern defeated Arsenal 5–1. Bayern got two goals from Thomas Müller and a goal each from Robert Lewandowski, David Alaba, and Arjen Robben. Robben's goal came on his first touch after 37 seconds. Olivier Giroud scored for Arsenal. The goal brought him up to three goals in four matches against Bayern. This was Arsenal's first loss at Allianz Arena. Mesut Özil had a goal called back after the referee ruled it that Özil put it in with his elbow. Bayern remained in first place. On 24 November, Bayern won their 100th Champions League home match, and won Group F, after they defeated Olympiacos 4–0 with goals from Douglas Costa, Robert Lewandowski, Thomas Müller, and Kingsley Coman. Holger Badstuber, who had started match since April 2015, was sent–off in the 52nd minute. Bayern finished the matchday in first place. On 9 December, Bayern finished the group stage by winning their fifth match in the group stage after defeating Dinamo Zagreb 2–0 with two goals from Robert Lewandowski. Thomas Müller failed to score from the penalty mark after the ball hit the post. Bayern finished the group by winning the group and obtained 15 points from five wins.

==== Knockout stage review ====
Bayern finished the group stage as the group winners which made Bayern one of the seeded teams in the Round of 16 draw. Bayern were drawn against Juventus on 14 December. The first leg took place on 23 February. Bayern and Juventus finished in a 2–2 draw. Thomas Müller and Arjen Robben scored for Bayern and Paulo Dybala and Stefano Sturaro scored for Juventus. Bayern went up 2–0 after Müller scored in the 43rd minute and Robben scored in the 55th minute. However, Bayern blew the 2–0 lead after two second-half goals from Dybala and Sturaro. The second leg happened on 16 March. Bayern won 4–2 in extra time. Robert Lewandowski, Thomas Müller, Thiago, and Kingsley Coman scored for Bayern. Paul Pogba and Juan Cuadrado scored for Juventus. Juventus took a 2–0 lead in the match with goals in the fifth minute from Pogba, and in the 28th minute, from Cuadrado. However, Bayern equalized in the second–half with a goal in the 73rd minute from Lewandowski and a goal from Müller one minute in to stoppage time. In extra time, Bayern took a 4–2 lead with goals from Thiago and Coman. The aggregate score was 6–4.

On 18 March, Bayern were drawn against Benfica for the quarter–finals. The first leg took place on 5 April. Bayern won 1–0 with a goal from Arturo Vidal. The goal was scored after one minute and 24 seconds. This the fastest goal Bayern has scored since David Alaba scored against Juventus in April 2013. The second leg was held on 13 April. The match finished in a 2–2. Arturo Vidal and Thomas Müller scored for Bayern and Raúl Jiménez and Talisca scored for Benfica. Philipp Lahm played in his 103rd UEFA Champions League match. This equaled Oliver Kahn's record for most appearances in Germany. Bayern qualified for the semifinal for the 5th year in a row after winning 3–2 on aggregate.

On 15 April, Bayern were drawn against Atlético Madrid. The first leg was played on 27 April. Atlético Madrid won the match 1–0 with a goal from Saúl. The second leg took place on 3 May. Bayern won the match 2–1. However, Atlético Madrid won the tie on away goals. Xabi Alonso and Robert Lewandowski scored for Bayern and Antoine Griezmann scored for Atlético Madrid.

=== Results ===
==== Group stage ====
===== Table =====
Pos	Team	Pld	W	D	L	GF	GA	GD	Pts	Qualification	BAY	ARS	OLY	DZG
1	(Germany) Bayern Munich	6	5	0	1	19	3	+16	15	Advance to knockout phase	—	5–1	4–0	5–0
2	(England) Arsenal	6	3	0	3	12	10	+2	9	Advance to knockout phase	2–0	—	2–3	3–0
3	(Greece) Olympiacos	6	3	0	3	6	13	−7	9	Transfer to Europa League	0–3	0–3	—	2–1
4	(Croatia) Dinamo Zagreb	6	1	0	5	3	14	−11	3		0–2	2–1	0–1	—

Source: UEFA
Rules for classification: Group stage tiebreakers

===== Group stage results =====
MD	Date	H/A	Opponent	Res. F–A	Att.	Goalscorers and disciplined players		Table		Ref.
MD	Date	H/A	Opponent	Res. F–A	Att.	Bayern Munich	Opponent	Pos.	Pts.	Ref.
1	16 September	A	Olympiacos	3–0	31,688	Müller (yellow card) 45' (goal) 52', 90+2' (pen.); Kimmich (yellow card) 86'; Götze 89'	Kasami (yellow card) 5'; Cambiasso (yellow card) 23'; Elabdellaoui (yellow card) 25'	1	3	
2	29 September	H	Dinamo Zagreb	5–0	70,000	Douglas Costa 13'; Boateng (yellow card) 21'; Lewandowski 21', 28', 55'; Götze 25'	Pivarić (yellow card) 66'; Ademi (yellow card) 81'	1	6	
3	20 October	A	Arsenal	0–2	49,824	—	Giroud 77' (yellow card) 84'; Özil 90+4'	1	6	
4	4 November	H	Arsenal	5–1	70,000	Lewandowski 10'; Müller 29', 89'; Alaba 44'; Robben 55'	Özil (yellow card) 12'; Campbell (yellow card) 24'; Giroud 69'	1	9	
5	24 November	H	Olympiacos	4–0	70,000	Douglas Costa 8'; Lewandowski 16'; Müller 20'; Boateng (yellow card) 42'; Badstuber (red card) 52'; Coman 69'	Milivojević (yellow card) 63'	1	12	
6	9 December	A	Dinamo Zagreb	2–0	19,681	Lewandowski 61', 64'	Gonçalo (yellow card) 31'; Pivarić (yellow card) 73'; Eduardo (yellow card) 87'	1	15	

==== Knockout stage ====
Leg	Date	Venue	Opponent	Res. F–A	Agg. score F–A	Att.	Goalscorers and disciplined players		Ref.
Leg	Date	Venue	Opponent	Res. F–A	Agg. score F–A	Att.	Bayern Munich	Opponent	Ref.
Round of 16
FL	23 February	A	Juventus	2–2	—	41,332	Douglas Costa (yellow card) 20'; Müller 43'; Robben 55'; Lewandowski (yellow card) 70'; Vidal (yellow card) 90'	Dybala 63'; Sturaro 76'; Morata (yellow card) 79'	
SL	16 March	H	Juventus	4–2 (a.e.t)	6–4	70,000	Kimmich (yellow card) 43'; Vidal (yellow card) 48'; Lewandowski (yellow card) 51' (goal) 73'; Müller 90+1'; Thiago 108' (yellow card) 109'; Coman 110'; Bernat (yellow card) 112'	Pogba 5'; Cuadrado 28' (yellow card) 71'; Khedira (yellow card) 29'; Morata (yellow card) 38'; Lichtsteiner (yellow card) 48'; Bonucci (yellow card) 53'; Pereyra (yellow card) 103'; Sturaro (yellow card) 112'	
Quarter-final
FL	5 April	H	Benfica	1–0	—	70,000	Vidal 2'; Ribéry (yellow card) 22'; Bernat (yellow card) 42'	Jonas (yellow card) 58'; Lindelöf (yellow card) 62'	
SL	13 April	A	Benfica	2–2	3–2	63,235	Vidal 38'; Müller 52'; Martínez (yellow card) 74'	Jiménez 27'; Carcela (yellow card) 70'; Talisca 76'; Almeida (yellow card) 90+1'	
Semi-final
FL	27 April	A	Atlético Madrid	0–1	—	52,127	Douglas Costa (yellow card) 40'; Benatia (yellow card) 82'; Neuer (yellow card) 82'; Vidal (yellow card) 88'	Saúl 11' (yellow card) 84'	
SL	3 May	H	Atlético Madrid	2–1	2–2a	70,000	Alonso 31'; Lewandowski 74'; Martínez (yellow card) 84'	Giménez (yellow card) 33'; Griezmann 54'	

== Team record ==
Competition	First match	Last match	Record							
Competition	First match	Last match	Pld	W	D	L	GF	GA	GD	Win %
Bundesliga	14 August 2015	14 May 2016	34	28	4	2	80	17	+63	82.35
DFB-Pokal	9 August 2015	21 May 2016	6	5	1	0	12	2	+10	83.33
DFL–Supercup	1 August		1	0	1	0	1	1	+0	0.00
Champions League	16 September 2015	3 May 2016	12	8	2	2	30	11	+19	66.67
Total			53	41	8	4	123	31	+92	77.36

Last updated: 21 May 2016

== Player information ==
=== Transfers and contracts ===
==== In ====
No.	Pos.	Name	Age	EU	Moving from	Type	Transfer Window	Contract ends	Transfer fee	Notes	Ref.
32	MF	(Germany) Joshua Kimmich	20	Yes	(Germany) Stuttgart	Transfer	Summer	2020	€7M		
34	MF	(Denmark) Pierre-Emile Højbjerg	19	Yes	(Germany) Augsburg	Loan return	Summer	—	—	—	
15	DF	(Germany) Jan Kirchhoff	24	Yes	(Germany) Schalke	Loan return	Summer	—	—	—	
37	MF	(United States) Julian Green	20	No	(Germany) Hamburg	Loan return	Summer	—	—	—	
26	GK	(Germany) Sven Ulreich	26	Yes	(Germany) Stuttgart	Transfer	Summer	2018	Undisclosed	—	
11	MF	(Brazil) Douglas Costa	24	No	(Ukraine) Shakhtar Donetsk	Transfer	Summer	2020	€30M	—	
23	MF	(Chile) Arturo Vidal	28	No	(Italy) Juventus	Transfer	Summer	2019	€37M	Transfer fee can be brought up to €40M with up to €3M of additions.	
29	MF	(France) Kingsley Coman	19	Yes	(Italy) Juventus	Loan	Summer	—	€7M	The loan is for two years. The loan comes with an option to buy for an extra €21M once loan expires.	
4	DF	(Germany) Serdar Tasci	28	Yes	(Russia) Spartak Moscow	Loan	Winter	—	Undisclosed	The loan comes with an option to buy after the loan is completed.	

==== Out ====
No.	Pos.	Name	Age	EU	Moving to	Type	Transfer Window	Transfer fee	Notes	Ref.
30	MF	(Germany) Mitchell Weiser	21	Yes	(Germany) Hertha BSC	End of contract	Summer	—	—	
23	GK	(Spain) Pepe Reina	32	Yes	(Italy) Napoli	Released	Summer	—	—	
14	FW	(Peru) Claudio Pizarro	36	No	(Germany) Werder Bremen	End of contract	Summer	—	—	
39	MF	(Germany) Rico Strieder	23	Yes	(Netherlands) Utrecht	Transfer	Summer	Undisclosed	—	
31	MF	(Germany) Bastian Schweinsteiger	30	Yes	(England) Manchester United	Transfer	Summer	Undisclosed	—	
34	MF	(Denmark) Pierre-Emile Højbjerg	20	Yes	(Germany) Schalke 04	Loan	Summer	Undisclosed	—	
4	DF	(Brazil) Dante	32	No	(Germany) Wolfsburg	Transfer	Summer	Undisclosed	—	
24	FW	(Germany) Sinan Kurt	19	Yes	(Germany) Hertha BSC	Transfer	Winter	€600,000	Transfer fee can rise if bonuses are applied.	
15	DF	(Germany) Jan Kirchhoff	25	Yes	(England) Sunderland	Transfer	Winter	Undisclosed	—	
16	MF	(Germany) Gianluca Gaudino	19	Yes	(Switzerland) St. Gallen	Loan	Winter	Undisclosed	Loan is until 30 June 2016.	

==== Contracts ====
No.	Player	Status	Contract length	Expiry date	Other notes	Ref.
11	Douglas Costa	Transfer	5 years	2020		
23	Arturo Vidal	Transfer	4 years	2019	Includes an optional fifth year.	
6	Thiago	Extension	2 years	2019	His contract was set to expire in 2017.	
25	Thomas Müller	Extension	2 years	2021	His contract was set to expire in 2019.	
8	Javi Martínez	Extension	4 years	2021	His contract was set to expire in 2017.	
17	Jérôme Boateng	Extension	3 years	2021	His contract was set to expire in 2018.	
14	Xabi Alonso	Extension	1 year	2017	His contract was set to expire in 2016.	
—	Carlo Ancelotti	Coach hiring	3 years	2019	He was hired to become head coach starting in the 2016–17 season.	
27	David Alaba	Extension	3 years	2021	His contract was set to expire in 2018.	
1	Manuel Neuer	Extension	2 years	2021	His contract was set to expire in 2019.	
	Renato Sanches	Transfer	5 years	2021	His transfer is for the 2016–17 season	
	Mats Hummels	Transfer	5 years	2021	His transfer is for the 2016–17 season	

=== Squad, appearances, and goals scored ===
As of 21 May 2016

No.	Pos	Nat	Player	Total		Bundesliga		DFB-Pokal		Super Cup		Champions League	
No.	Pos	Nat	Player	Apps	Goals	Apps	Goals	Apps	Goals	Apps	Goals	Apps	Goals
1	GK	(Germany) GER	Manuel Neuer	51	0	34	0	5	0	1	0	11	0
22	GK	(Germany) GER	Tom Starke	0	0	0	0	0	0	0	0	0	0
26	GK	(Germany) GER	Sven Ulreich	3	0	1	0	1	0	0	0	1	0
33	GK	(Austria) AUT	Ivan Lučić	0	0	0	0	0	0	0	0	0	0
4	DF	(Germany) GER	Serdar Tasci	3	0	3	0	0	0	0	0	0	0
5	DF	(Morocco) MAR	Medhi Benatia	21	1	14	1	1	0	1	0	5	0
8	DF	(Spain) ESP	Javi Martínez	27	1	16	1	3	0	0	0	8	0
13	DF	(Brazil) BRA	Rafinha	34	0	25	0	4	0	1	0	4	0
17	DF	(Germany) GER	Jérôme Boateng	31	0	19	0	4	0	1	0	7	0
18	DF	(Spain) ESP	Juan Bernat	27	0	16	0	3	0	0	0	8	0
27	DF	(Austria) AUT	David Alaba	46	2	30	1	5	0	1	0	10	1
28	DF	(Germany) GER	Holger Badstuber	9	0	7	0	1	0	0	0	1	0
39	DF	(Germany) GER	Phillipp Steinhart	0	0	0	0	0	0	0	0	0	0
6	MF	(Spain) ESP	Thiago	42	4	27	2	5	1	1	0	9	1
7	MF	(France) FRA	Franck Ribéry	21	2	13	2	2	0	0	0	6	0
10	MF	(Netherlands) NED	Arjen Robben	22	7	15	4	3	0	1	1	3	2
11	MF	(Brazil) BRA	Douglas Costa	42	8	27	5	3	1	1	0	11	2
14	MF	(Spain) ESP	Xabi Alonso	39	2	26	0	4	1	1	0	8	1
19	MF	(Germany) GER	Mario Götze	21	6	14	3	2	1	1	0	4	2
20	MF	(Germany) GER	Sebastian Rode	17	1	15	1	1	0	0	0	1	0
21	MF	(Germany) GER	Philipp Lahm	45	1	26	1	6	0	1	0	12	0
23	MF	(Chile) CHI	Arturo Vidal	48	7	30	4	6	1	1	0	11	2
25	MF	(Germany) GER	Thomas Müller	49	32	31	20	5	4	1	0	12	8
29	MF	(France) FRA	Kingsley Coman	35	6	23	4	4	0	0	0	8	2
32	MF	(Germany) GER	Joshua Kimmich	35	0	23	0	4	0	0	0	8	0
37	MF	(United States) USA	Julian Green	1	0	0	0	0	0	0	0	1	0
40	MF	(Germany) GER	Fabian Benko	0	0	0	0	0	0	0	0	0	0
9	FW	(Poland) POL	Robert Lewandowski	51	42	32	30	6	3	1	0	12	9
41	FW	(Serbia) SRB	Miloš Pantović	1	0	1	0	0	0	0	0	0	0
Players who left after the start of the season.
4	DF	(Brazil) BRA	Dante	2	0	1	0	1	0	0	0	0	0
15	DF	(Germany) GER	Jan Kirchhoff	1	0	0	0	1	0	0	0	0	0
16	MF	(Germany) GER	Gianluca Gaudino	0	0	0	0	0	0	0	0	0	0
24	FW	(Germany) GER	Sinan Kurt	0	0	0	0	0	0	0	0	0	0
34	MF	(Denmark) DEN	Pierre-Emile Højbjerg	1	0	0	0	1	0	0	0	0	0

=== Discipline ===
==== Cards ====
As of 21 May 2016

Player	Total			Bundesliga			DFB-Pokal			Champions League			Ref.
Player	Yellow card	(yellow card) (red card)	Red card	Yellow card	(yellow card) (red card)	Red card	Yellow card	(yellow card) (red card)	Red card	Yellow card	(yellow card) (red card)	Red card	Ref.
Jérôme Boateng	7	1	0	4	1	0	1	0	0	2	0	0	
Rafinha	8	0	0	7	0	0	1	0	0	0	0	0	
Xabi Alonso	7	1	0	6	1	0	1	0	0	0	0	0	
Joshua Kimmich	6	0	0	3	0	0	1	0	0	2	0	0	
Arturo Vidal	8	0	0	3	0	0	2	0	0	3	0	0	
Thomas Müller	6	0	0	4	0	0	1	0	0	1	0	0	
Juan Bernat	5	0	0	2	0	0	1	0	0	2	0	0	
Holger Badstuber	0	0	1	0	0	0	0	0	0	0	0	1	
Javi Martínez	4	0	0	2	0	0	0	0	0	2	0	0	
Philipp Lahm	3	0	0	3	0	0	0	0	0	0	0	0	
David Alaba	2	0	0	2	0	0	0	0	0	0	0	0	
Arjen Robben	1	0	0	1	0	0	0	0	0	0	0	0	
Thiago	3	0	0	2	0	0	0	0	0	1	0	0	
Kingsley Coman	1	0	0	0	0	0	1	0	0	0	0	0	
Manuel Neuer	1	0	0	0	0	0	0	0	0	1	0	0	
Tom Starke	0	0	0	0	0	0	0	0	0	0	0	0	
Sven Ulreich	0	0	0	0	0	0	0	0	0	0	0	0	
Ivan Lučić	0	0	0	0	0	0	0	0	0	0	0	0	
Dante	0	0	0	0	0	0	0	0	0	0	0	0	
Medhi Benatia	3	0	0	2	0	0	0	0	0	1	0	0	
Jan Kirchhoff	0	0	0	0	0	0	0	0	0	0	0	0	
Phillipp Steinhart	0	0	0	0	0	0	0	0	0	0	0	0	
Franck Ribéry	3	0	0	1	0	0	1	0	0	1	0	0	
Fabian Benko	0	0	0	0	0	0	0	0	0	0	0	0	
Douglas Costa	3	0	0	1	0	0	0	0	0	2	0	0	
Gianluca Gaudino	0	0	0	0	0	0	0	0	0	0	0	0	
Mario Götze	1	0	0	1	0	0	0	0	0	0	0	0	
Sebastian Rode	1	0	0	1	0	0	0	0	0	0	0	0	
Pierre-Emile Højbjerg	0	0	0	0	0	0	0	0	0	0	0	0	
Julian Green	0	0	0	0	0	0	0	0	0	0	0	0	
Robert Lewandowski	4	0	0	2	0	0	0	0	0	2	0	0	
Sinan Kurt	0	0	0	0	0	0	0	0	0	0	0	0	
Miloš Pantović	0	0	0	0	0	0	0	0	0	0	0	0	
Serdar Tasci	1	0	0	1	0	0	0	0	0	0	0	0	
Totals	78	2	1	48	2	0	10	0	0	20	0	1	—

==== Suspensions ====
Jérôme Boateng received the first suspension of the season after receiving a red card after picking up a second yellow card against 1899 Hoffenheim on 22 August. Holger Badstuber was the second Bayern player to be sent–off during the 2015–16 season. He was sent–off in a Champions League Group Stage match against Olympiacos after being the last outfield player when Brown Ideye was fouled.

Player	No. of matches served	Reason	Competition	Date served	Opponent(s)	Ref.
Jérôme Boateng	1	Two yellow cards vs. 1899 Hoffenheim.	Bundesliga	29 August	Bayer Leverkusen	
Holger Badstuber	1	Red card vs. Olympiacos.	Champions League	9 December	Dinamo Zagreb	
Xabi Alonso	1	Two yellow cards vs. Bayer Leverkusen	Bundesliga	14 February	Augsburg	
