= 2016–17 FC Bayern Munich season =

118th season in existence of Bayern Munich

Bayern Munich
2016–17 season
- President: Karl Hopfner (until 25 November); Uli Hoeneß (from 25 November)
- CEO: Karl-Heinz Rummenigge
- Head coach: Carlo Ancelotti
- Stadium: Allianz Arena
- Bundesliga: 1st
- DFB-Pokal: Semi-finals
- DFL-Supercup: Winners
- UEFA Champions League: Quarter-finals
- Top goalscorer: League: Robert Lewandowski (30 goals); All: Robert Lewandowski (43 goals)
- Highest home attendance: 75,000
- Lowest home attendance: 70,000
- Average home league attendance: 75,000
- Biggest win: Bayern 8–0 Hamburg
- Biggest defeat: Real Madrid 4–2 (a.e.t.) Bayern
Home colours	Away colours	Third colours
- All statistics correct as of 27 May 2017.

The 2016–17 FC Bayern Munich season was the 118th season in the football club's history and 52nd consecutive and overall season in the top flight of German football, the Bundesliga, having won promotion from the Regionalliga in 1965 after winning the Regionalliga Süd. Bayern Munich also participated in this season's edition of the domestic cup, the DFB-Pokal, and the premier continental cup competition, the UEFA Champions League. Bayern were the reigning Bundesliga and DFB-Pokal champions, and therefore also participated in the German super cup, the DFL-Supercup. It was the 12th season for Bayern in the Allianz Arena, located in Munich, Germany. The season covers a period from 11 July 2016 to 30 June 2017.

== Review ==
=== Background ===
Bayern won the double in the previous season after winning a record-setting fourth consecutive and 25th overall Bundesliga title (26th German title) and 18th DFB-Pokal title. Manager Pep Guardiola did not extend his contract, and decided to move to Manchester City. Carlo Ancelotti was announced as his replacement in December 2015.

In addition, Bayern hired Paul Clement as their assistant coach. Hermann Gerland was also kept as an assistant coach, after also having been an assistant under Louis van Gaal, Jupp Heynckes, and Pep Guardiola. Toni Tapalović was retained as the goalkeeping coach, while Giovanni Mauri and Francesco Mauri were brought in as fitness coaches. In August, Carlo Aneclotti named his son Davide as assistant coach, joining Clement and Gerland.

Bayern signed Renato Sanches from Benfica and Mats Hummels from Borussia Dortmund on 10 May. Serdar Tasci returned to Spartak Moscow after his loan spell was finished. On 24 May, Pierre-Emile Højbjerg confirmed that he would be leaving Bayern, and on 11 July he transferred to Southampton. Patrick Weihrauch, who never made a senior appearance for Bayern, also left the club for Würzburger Kickers on 2 June. On 6 June, after making 17 appearances in all competitions during the 2015–16 season, Sebastian Rode left the club for Borussia Dortmund. Medhi Benatia was sent out on a season-long loan to Juventus, with the option to make it permanent for €17M. On 1 August, Mario Götze returned to Borussia Dortmund after three difficult seasons at the club. Goalkeeper Ivan Lučić signed for Bristol City on 27 July.

=== July ===
The new season officially began on 11 July 2016 with the presentation of Carlo Ancelotti as new manager and a training session. Jérôme Boateng, Manuel Neuer, Joshua Kimmich, Thomas Müller, Mats Hummels, Robert Lewandowski, Kingsley Coman, and Renato Sanches were all given an extended break until 5 August after UEFA Euro 2016.

On 23 July, Bayern played in their first pre-season friendly match against SV Lippstadt. The friendly was organised with Karl-Heinz Rummenigge's former club as part of a 60th birthday present for him. The match was meant to take place in October 2015, but was cancelled and rescheduled for July. Bayern won the match 4–3 after goals from Julian Green, Arjen Robben, and Franck Ribéry, along with a Lippstadt own goal. However, Robben suffered a hamstring injury, ruling him out for six weeks. On 20 July, Bayern faced Manchester City and former manager Pep Guardiola at home. Bayern won the match 1–0 after a goal from Erdal Öztürk in the 76th minute. Bayern's third pre-season friendly took place on 23 July against SpVgg Landshut. Bayern won 3–0 with goals from Franck Ribéry, David Alaba, and Daniel Hägler.

In March 2016, Bayern announced they would participate in a summer tour (referred to as the "2016 Audi Summer Tour") in the United States as part of the International Champions Cup, after success with their previous US visit in 2014. Bayern began their International Champions Cup campaign against Milan on 27 July in Chicago. Milan took the lead, but Bayern struck back with a goals from Ribéry and Alaba to give them the lead at half-time. In the second half, Milan retook the lead after scoring two goals. However, Bayern were awarded a penalty in the dying minutes, and Ribéry converted it to secure a 3–3 draw. The match would be decided on penalties, which Bayern lost 5–3 after Rafinha missed his spot kick. However, one point was still awarded for a loss on penalties. In their second match, Bayern faced Internazionale on 30 July in Charlotte. Bayern won the match 4–1 after a goal from Ribéry and a hat-trick from Green.

=== August ===
In their third match on 3 August, Bayern faced Real Madrid in East Rutherford. Bayern lost 1–0 after Danilo scored the winning goal in the 79th minute. Bayern finished 6th in the United States and Europe table.

Bayern returned to Munich on 4 August, and began final preparations for the new season. Their first competitive match was the DFL-Supercup away to Borussia Dortmund on 14 August. As Bayern completed the domestic double the previous season, Dortmund qualified as league runners-up. Bayern won the match 2–0 with second half goals from Arturo Vidal and Thomas Müller, after being outplayed in the opening 45 minutes.

In the first round of the DFB-Pokal, Bayern were drawn against fourth-division side Carl Zeiss Jena. The away match took place on 19 August. Bayern won 5–0 with a first half hat-trick from Lewandowski, and goals from Vidal and Hummels in the second period.

Bayern qualified automatically for the UEFA Champions League group stage after winning the Bundesliga the previous season. The draw for the group stage took place on 25 August, at the Grimaldi Forum in Monaco. Bayern were placed in Pot 1, and were drawn into Group D, along with Atlético Madrid, who knocked them out of the semi-finals in the previous season, PSV Eindhoven, and Rostov.

In late June, the DFL released the full Bundesliga schedule for the upcoming season. Bayern Munich were selected to face Werder Bremen at home in the season opener on 26 August. Bayern won the match 6–0, making it the biggest win by a defending champion to start the season. Xabi Alonso opened the scoring in the 9th minute, followed by Lewandowski four minutes later. Lewandowski then scored his second in the first minute of the second half, followed by goals from Philipp Lahm in the 66th minute and Ribéry in the 73rd. Lewandowski then completed his hat-trick in the 77th minute from the penalty spot. The win put Bayern in first following the matchday. Following the match, Bayern were drawn into a derby match against FC Augsburg at home for the second round of the DFB-Pokal, to take place on 26 October.

=== September ===
After the international break, Bayern faced Schalke 04, who were 15th in the table, for matchday 2 of the Bundesliga on 9 September. Bayern won the away match 2–0, sealing the win with two late goals. Lewandowski put Bayern ahead in the 81st minute, and Joshua Kimmich scored his first goal for the club in the second minute of stoppage time. The win kept Bayern at top of the table.

On 13 September, Bayern faced Russian side Rostov at home for the first Champions League fixture. Bayern won the match 5–0, with Lewandowski converting a penalty in the 28th minute before Müller scored on his birthday during second half stoppage time. Kimmich then scored a brace, with goals in the 53rd and 60th minutes. Juan Bernat then finished off the scoring with a goal in the 90th minute. With the win, Bayern finished top of Group D.

Bayern faced FC Ingolstadt, who were 16th in the table, at home on matchday 3 of the Bundesliga on 17 September. Bayern won the derby match 3–1, keeping them top of the table. Bayern went behind 8 minutes in after a goal from Darío Lezcano, but equalised four minutes later via a goal from Lewandowski. Alonso scored in the 50th minute to put Bayern in front, and Rafinha sealed the win with a goal in the 84th minute, his first since April 2013.

On 21 September, matchday 4 of the Bundesliga, Bayern played at home against Hertha BSC, who were second in the table and had a perfect record. Bayern won the match 3–0, putting them 2 points clear at the top of the table. Ribéry opened the scoring in the 16th minute, before Thiago extended Bayern's lead in the 68th minute. Robben, returning from injury, scored his first of the season in the 72nd minute after coming on as a substitute to wrap up the scoring.

Bayern met Hamburger SV on matchday 5 of the Bundesliga, taking place on 24 September. The match finished as a 1–0 win for Bayern, keeping them in first place in the league. The match was scoreless until the 88th minute, when Kimmich scored the lone goal, giving Bayern the late victory. The next day, Hamburg coach Bruno Labbadia was sacked after a winless start to the Bundesliga.

On 28 September, Bayern faced Spanish side Atlético Madrid away on matchday 2 in the Champions League. Bayern lost the match 0–1 for their first competitive loss of the season, putting them second in the group behind Atlético. Madrid opened the scoring in the 35th minute through Yannick Carrasco, deflecting off the post and in. Although having numerous opportunities, Bayern were unable to equalise, and in the 84th minute, Atlético were given a penalty after a poor challenge by Vidal on Filipe Luís. Antoine Griezmann missed the penalty, having hit the crossbar, but Atlético held on for the victory.

=== October ===
Bayern faced 1. FC Köln at home on 1 October, matchday 6 of the Bundesliga. The match finished as a 1–1 draw, their first dropped league points of the season, with Bayern staying 3 points clear at the top of the table. Kimmich opened the scoring for Bayern in the 40 minutes in, before Anthony Modeste equalised 63rd minute against the run of play. Bayern had numerous opportunities, but were unable to capitalise, making it two winless games in a row for the Bavarians.

After the international break, Bayern faced Eintracht Frankfurt away on 15 October, week 7 of the Bundesliga. The match finished as a 2–2 draw, their third consecutive winless match, but stayed first in the table with a 2-point lead. Robben opened the scoring for Bayern in the 10th minute, before Szabolcs Huszti equalised for Frankfurt right before half-time. Bayern once again went ahead after a goal from Kimmich in the 62nd minute, but Eintracht once again leveled the score, with a goal from Marco Fabián in the 78th minute securing the draw. During the match, reserve goalkeeper Tom Starke was sent off from the sidelines after a confrontation with Frankfurt players. However, he was not listed as a substitute despite being on the bench. The DFB Sports Court handed Starke a one match suspension, making him unavailable for selection against Borussia Mönchengladbach.

On 19 October, Bayern met Dutch side PSV Eindhoven at home on matchday 3 of the Champions League. Bayern won the match 4–1, staying second in the group standings. Müller opened the scoring in the 13th minute, before Kimmich added a second 8 minutes later. Luciano Narsingh got a goal back for Eindhoven to reduce the deficit to 2–1 going into half-time. In the 59th minute, Lewandowski put Bayern back to a two-goal lead, before Robben wrapped up the scoring in the 84th minute.

Bayern met Borussia Mönchengladbach at home on 22 October, matchday 8 of the Bundesliga. The match finished as a 2–0 win to Bayern, maintaining their 2-point lead at the top of the table. Vidal scored the first goal for Bayern in the 16th minute via a header. Fifteen minutes later, Douglas Costa extended Bayern's lead, which was enough for the win.

On 26 October, Bayern met FC Augsburg in round 2 of the DFB-Pokal. Bayern won the derby match 3–1, advancing to the round of 16. Lahm opened the scoring for Bayern only two minutes in, before Green doubled Bayern's lead four minutes before half-time. Only two minutes in the second half, Augsburg were awarded a penalty after Hummels knocked Gojko Kačar to the ground. Koo Ja-cheol had his penalty saved by Neuer, maintaining Bayern's two-goal advantage. Nine minutes later, Bayern were also awarded a penalty after a handball from Georg Teigl. However, Müller skied the ball over the crossbar. Augsburg then cut the deficit in the 68th minute via a goal from Ji Dong-won. In the third minute of stoppage time, Alaba scored Bayern's third goal and sealed the win. Following the match, Bayern were drawn against VfL Wolfsburg in the round of 16 of the DFB-Pokal, to take place on 7–8 February 2017 at home.

On 29 October, Bayern met FC Augsburg once again, this time away in week 9 of the Bundesliga. Bayern again won the derby match by the same scoreline of 3–1, keeping themselves first in the table by two points. Lewandowski opened the scoring in the 19th minute, before Robben doubled Bayern's advantage two minutes later. After two minutes into the second half, Lewandowski completed a brace, putting Bayern up by three. In the 67th minute, Koo Ja-cheol got a goal back for Augsburg, which ended up only as a consolation.

=== November ===
Bayern met PSV Eindhoven once again on 1 November, matchday 4 of the Champions League. Bayern won the match 2–1, keeping themselves second in the group standings. Santiago Arias opened the scoring for PSV with a possibly offside header past Neuer. However, the linesman did not see this, and the goal was given. In the 34th minute, Bayern were given the chance to equalise from the penalty spot after a handball from Andrés Guardado. Lewandowski scored the penalty to put Bayern level. The score remained level until the 73rd minute, when Lewandowski completed a brace with a goal following a cross from Alaba. With the win, Bayern qualified for the knockout phase of the Champions League, along with Atlético Madrid. The win also meant the elimination of PSV from the Champions League.

On 5 November, Bayern played 1899 Hoffenheim at home on matchday 10 of the Bundesliga. The match finished as a 1–1 draw, keeping Bayern at the top of the table based on goal difference. Kerem Demirbay opened the scoring for Hoffenheim in the 16th minute. Bayern equalised in the 34th minute via an own goal from Steven Zuber after a cross from Douglas Costa intended for Lewandowski. Both sides had chances in the second half, but the scores remained level.

== Players ==
=== Squad ===
Note: Flags indicate national team as defined under FIFA eligibility rules; some limited exceptions apply. Players may hold more than one non-FIFA nationality.

No.	Pos.	Nation	Player
1	GK	GER	Manuel Neuer (vice-captain)
5	DF	GER	Mats Hummels
6	MF	ESP	Thiago
7	MF	FRA	Franck Ribéry
8	MF	ESP	Javi Martínez
9	FW	POL	Robert Lewandowski
10	MF	NED	Arjen Robben
11	MF	BRA	Douglas Costa
13	DF	BRA	Rafinha
14	MF	ESP	Xabi Alonso
17	DF	GER	Jérôme Boateng
18	DF	ESP	Juan Bernat

No.	Pos.	Nation	Player
21	DF	GER	Philipp Lahm (captain)
22	GK	GER	Tom Starke
23	MF	CHI	Arturo Vidal
25	FW	GER	Thomas Müller (3rd captain)
26	GK	GER	Sven Ulreich
27	DF	AUT	David Alaba
29	FW	FRA	Kingsley Coman (on loan from Juventus)
30	MF	GER	Niklas Dorsch
32	MF	GER	Joshua Kimmich
35	MF	POR	Renato Sanches
40	MF	GER	Fabian Benko

=== Transfers ===
==== In ====
No.	Pos.	Nat.	Name	Age	EU	Moving from	Type	Transfer window	Ends	Transfer fee	Source
35	MF	(Portugal)	Renato Sanches	18	EU	Benfica	Transfer	Summer	2021	€ 35M	
5	DF	(Germany)	Mats Hummels	27	EU	Borussia Dortmund	Transfer	Summer	2021	€ 38M	

==== Out ====
No.	Pos.	Nat.	Name	Age	EU	Moving to	Type	Transfer window	Transfer fee	Source
4	DF	(Germany)	Serdar Tasci	29	EU	Spartak Moscow (Russia)	Loan return	Summer	—	
36	FW	(Germany)	Patrick Weihrauch	22	EU	Würzburger Kickers	Transfer	Summer	Undisclosed	
20	MF	(Germany)	Sebastian Rode	25	EU	Borussia Dortmund	Transfer	Summer	€ 14M	
34	MF	(Denmark)	Pierre-Emile Højbjerg	20	EU	Southampton (England)	Transfer	Summer	€ 15M	
5	DF	(Morocco)	Medhi Benatia	29	Non-EU	Juventus (Italy)	Loan	Summer	€3M	
19	MF	(Germany)	Mario Götze	24	EU	Borussia Dortmund	Transfer	Summer	€ 26M	
33	GK	(Austria)	Ivan Lučić	21	EU	Bristol City (England)	Transfer	Summer	Undisclosed	
37	FW	(United States)	Julian Green	21	EU	VfB Stuttgart	Transfer	Winter	€ 0.3M	
28	DF	(Germany)	Holger Badstuber	27	EU	Schalke 04	Loan	Winter	€ 3M	

== Friendly matches ==
Win Draw Loss

16 July 2016 Friendly	SV Lippstadt	3–4	Bayern Munich	Lippstadt, Germany
17:00 CEST (UTC+2)	Rump 51'; Parensen 57'; Maiella 88'	Report	Green 9'; Robben 16'; Ribéry 33'; Joswig 49' (o.g.)	Stadium: Stadion am Bruchbaum; Attendance: 8,500; Referee: Florian Exner

20 July 2016 Friendly	Bayern Munich	1–0	Manchester City	Munich, Germany
20:30 CEST (UTC+2)	Öztürk 76'	Report		Stadium: Allianz Arena; Attendance: 68,000; Referee: Günter Perl

23 July 2016 Friendly	SpVgg Landshut	0–3	Bayern Munich	Landshut, Germany
17:30 CEST (UTC+2)		Report	Ribéry 34'; Alaba 39'; Hägler 79'	Stadium: ebm-papst Stadion am Hammerbach; Attendance: 7,500; Referee: Thomas Berg

27 July 2016 ICC 1	Bayern Munich	3–3 (3–5 p)	Milan	Chicago, Illinois, United States
20:00 CDT (UTC−5); 28 July 2016, 04:00 CEST (UTC+2)	Ribéry 29', 90' (pen.); Alaba 38'	Report	Niang 23'; Bertolacci 49'; Kucka 61'	Stadium: Soldier Field; Attendance: 44,826; Referee: Mark Geiger (United States)
	Penalties
	Lahm (penalty scored); Alaba (penalty scored); Bernat (penalty scored); Rafinha (penalty missed)		(penalty scored) Honda; (penalty scored) Matri; (penalty scored) Kucka; (penalty scored) Romagnoli; (penalty scored) Bonaventura
Note: This match was part of the 2016 Audi Football Summit.

30 July 2016 ICC 2	Internazionale	1–4	Bayern Munich	Charlotte, North Carolina, United States
17:00 EDT (UTC−4); 23:00 CEST (UTC+2)	Icardi 90'	Report	Green 7', 30', 35'; Ribéry 13'	Stadium: Bank of America Stadium; Attendance: 53,629; Referee: Mark Kadlecik (United States)

3 August 2016 ICC 3	Bayern Munich	0–1	Real Madrid	East Rutherford, New Jersey, United States
19:30 EDT (UTC−4); 4 August 2016, 01:30 CEST (UTC+2)		Report	Danilo 79'	Stadium: MetLife Stadium; Attendance: 82,012; Referee: Jaime Herrera (United States)
Note: This match was part of the 2016 Audi Football Summit.

10 January 2017 Friendly	Eupen	0–5	Bayern Munich	Doha, Qatar
18:00 AST (UTC+3); 16:00 CET (UTC+1)		Report	Hummels 45'; Benko 48', 81'; Vidal 66'; Douglas Costa 71'	Stadium: ASPIRE Dome Hall 1 Attendance: 500; Referee: Abdulhadi al-Rowaily (Qatar)

14 January 2017 TC Semi-finals	Fortuna Düsseldorf	0–0 (1–4 p)	Bayern Munich	Düsseldorf, Germany
15:00 CET (UTC+1)		Report		Stadium: ESPRIT arena Attendance: 41,244; Referee: Sven Waschitzki
	Penalties
	Hennings (penalty missed); Fink (penalty missed); Ayhan (penalty scored)		(penalty scored) Vidal; (penalty scored) Alonso; (penalty scored) Douglas Costa; (penalty scored) Alaba
Note: The match was only 45 minutes.

14 January 2017 TC Final	Bayern Munich	2–1	Mainz 05	Düsseldorf, Germany
18:45 CET (UTC+1)	Ribéry 4'; Martínez 11'	Report	Ramalho 8'	Stadium: ESPRIT arena Attendance: 41,244; Referee: Benjamin Bläser
Note: The match was only 45 minutes.

== Competitions ==
Win Draw Loss

=== Overview ===
Competition	First match	Last match	Starting round	Final position	Record							
Competition	First match	Last match	Starting round	Final position	Pld	W	D	L	GF	GA	GD	Win %
Bundesliga	26 August 2016	20 May 2017	Matchday 1	Winners	34	25	7	2	89	22	+67	73.53
DFB-Pokal	19 August 2016	26 April 2017	First round	Semi-finals	5	4	0	1	14	4	+10	80.00
DFL-Supercup	14 August 2016		Final	Winners	1	1	0	0	2	0	+2	100.00
Champions League	13 September 2016	18 April 2017	Group stage	Quarter-finals	10	6	0	4	27	14	+13	60.00
Total					50	36	7	7	132	40	+92	72.00

Last updated: 27 May 2017
Source: Competitions

=== Bundesliga ===
==== League table ====
Pos	Team	Pld	W	D	L	GF	GA	GD	Pts	Qualification or relegation
1	Bayern Munich (C)	34	25	7	2	89	22	+67	82	Qualification for the Champions League group stage
2	RB Leipzig	34	20	7	7	66	39	+27	67	Qualification for the Champions League group stage
3	Borussia Dortmund	34	18	10	6	72	40	+32	64	Qualification for the Champions League group stage
4	1899 Hoffenheim	34	16	14	4	64	37	+27	62	Qualification for the Champions League play-off round
5	1. FC Köln	34	12	13	9	51	42	+9	49	Qualification for the Europa League group stage (Note: Since the winners of the 2016–17 DFB-Pokal, Borussia Dortmund, qualified for the Champions League based on league position, the Europa League group stage spot was passed to the sixth-placed team, Hertha BSC; and the Europa League third qualifying round spot was passed to the seventh-placed team, SC Freiburg.)

Source: DFB
Rules for classification: 1) Points; 2) Goal difference; 3) Goals scored; 4) Head-to-head points; 5) Head-to-head goal difference; 6) Head-to-head away goals scored; 7) Away goals scored; 8) Play-off.
(C) Champions

==== Results summary ====
Overall								Home						Away					
Pld	W	D	L	GF	GA	GD	Pts	W	D	L	GF	GA	GD	W	D	L	GF	GA	GD
34	25	7	2	89	22	+67	82	13	4	0	55	9	+46	12	3	2	34	13	+21

Last updated: 27 May 2017.
Source: Bundesliga

==== Results by round ====
Round	1	2	3	4	5	6	7	8	9	10	11	12	13	14	15	16	17	18	19	20	21	22	23	24	25	26	27	28	29	30	31	32	33	34
Ground	H	A	H	H	A	H	A	H	A	H	A	H	A	H	A	H	A	A	H	A	A	H	A	H	A	H	A	H	A	H	A	H	A	H
Result	W	W	W	W	W	D	D	W	W	D	L	W	W	W	W	W	W	W	D	W	D	W	W	W	W	W	L	W	D	D	W	W	W	W
Position	1	1	1	1	1	1	1	1	1	1	2	2	2	1	1	1	1	1	1	1	1	1	1	1	1	1	1	1	1	1	1	1	1	1

Updated to match(es) played on 27 May 2017. Source: Bundesliga
A = Away; H = Home; W = Win; D = Draw; L = Loss

==== Matches ====
26 August 2016 1	Bayern Munich	6–0	Werder Bremen	Munich
20:30 CEST (UTC+2)	Alonso 9'; Lewandowski 13', 46', 77' (pen.); Lahm 66'; Ribéry 73'	Report	Sternberg (yellow card) 87'	Stadium: Allianz Arena; Attendance: 75,000; Referee: Christian Dingert

9 September 2016 2	Schalke 04	0–2	Bayern Munich	Gelsenkirchen
20:30 CEST (UTC+2)	Höwedes (yellow card) 38'; Baba (yellow card) 90+1'	Report	Hummels (yellow card) 17'; Sanches (yellow card) 69'; Vidal (yellow card) 71'; Lewandowski 81'; Thiago (yellow card) 90+1'; Kimmich 90+2'	Stadium: VELTINS-Arena; Attendance: 62,271; Referee: Manuel Gräfe

17 September 2016 3	Bayern Munich	3–1	FC Ingolstadt	Munich
15:30 CEST (UTC+2)	Lewandowski 12'; Alonso 50'; Thiago (yellow card) 81'; Rafinha 84'	Report	Lezcano 8'; Tisserand (yellow card) 59'; Lex (yellow card) 72'	Stadium: Allianz Arena; Attendance: 75,000; Referee: Patrick Ittrich

21 September 2016 4	Bayern Munich	3–0	Hertha BSC	Munich
20:00 CEST (UTC+2)	Ribéry 16'; Thiago 68'; Robben 72'; Vidal (yellow card) 80'	Report		Stadium: Allianz Arena; Attendance: 75,000; Referee: Marco Fritz

24 September 2016 5	Hamburger SV	0–1	Bayern Munich	Hamburg
15:30 CEST (UTC+2)	Douglas Santos (yellow card) 70'; Gregoritsch (yellow card) 90+2'	Report	Martínez (yellow card) 65'; Ribéry (yellow card) 73'; Kimmich (yellow card) 83', (goal) 88'	Stadium: Volksparkstadion; Attendance: 57,000; Referee: Felix Zwayer

1 October 2016 6	Bayern Munich	1–1	1. FC Köln	Munich
15:30 CEST (UTC+2)	Kimmich 40'; Martínez (yellow card) 68'	Report	Modeste 63'; Sørensen (yellow card) 65'; Zoller (yellow card) 68'	Stadium: Allianz Arena; Attendance: 75,000; Referee: Daniel Siebert

15 October 2016 7	Eintracht Frankfurt	2–2	Bayern Munich	Frankfurt
15:30 CEST (UTC+2)	Hector (yellow card) 8'; Huszti (yellow card) 34' (yellow-red card) 65', (goal) 43'; Fabián 78'; Chandler (yellow card) 86'; Hrádecký (yellow card) 90+1'	Report	Robben 10'; Alonso (yellow card) 21'; Hummels (yellow card) 31'; Kimmich 62'; Sanches (yellow card) 65'; Lahm (yellow card) 74'	Stadium: Commerzbank-Arena; Attendance: 49,500; Referee: Bastian Dankert
Note: Tom Starke was sent off from the bench in the 66th minute, but was not listed as a substitute.

22 October 2016 8	Bayern Munich	2–0	Borussia Mönchengladbach	Munich
18:30 CEST (UTC+2)	Vidal 16'; Douglas Costa 31'	Report	Kramer (yellow card) 71'	Stadium: Allianz Arena; Attendance: 75,000; Referee: Jochen Drees

29 October 2016 9	FC Augsburg	1–3	Bayern Munich	Augsburg
15:30 CEST (UTC+2)	Koo (yellow card) 35', (goal) 67'; Teigl (yellow card) 75'	Report	Lewandowski 19', 48'; Robben 21'	Stadium: WWK ARENA; Attendance: 30,660; Referee: Christian Dingert

5 November 2016 10	Bayern Munich	1–1	1899 Hoffenheim	Munich
15:30 CET (UTC+1)	Zuber 34' (o.g.)	Report	Demirbay 16'; Rudy (yellow card) 56'; Bičakčić (yellow card) 90'	Stadium: Allianz Arena; Attendance: 75,000; Referee: Markus Schmidt

19 November 2016 11	Borussia Dortmund	1–0	Bayern Munich	Dortmund
18:30 CET (UTC+1)	Aubameyang 11'; Bartra (yellow card) 19'; Götze (yellow card) 50'; Ramos (yellow card) 88'	Report	Ribéry (yellow card) 88'; Sanches (yellow card) 90+1'	Stadium: Signal Iduna Park; Attendance: 81,360; Referee: Tobias Stieler

26 November 2016 12	Bayern Munich	2–1	Bayer Leverkusen	Munich
18:30 CET (UTC+1)	Thiago 30'; Hummels 56'	Report	Çalhanoğlu 35'	Stadium: Allianz Arena; Attendance: 75,000; Referee: Marco Fritz

2 December 2016 13	Mainz 05	1–3	Bayern Munich	Mainz
20:30 CET (UTC+1)	Córdoba 4', (yellow card) 83'; Bell (yellow card) 85'; Balogun (yellow card) 90+1'	Report	Lewandowski 8', 90+2', (yellow card) 76'; Robben 21'; Martínez (yellow card) 44'	Stadium: OPEL ARENA; Attendance: 34,000; Referee: Daniel Siebert

10 December 2016 14	Bayern Munich	5–0	VfL Wolfsburg	Munich
15:30 CET (UTC+1)	Robben 18'; Lewandowski 22', 58'; Thiago (yellow card) 25'; Müller 76'; Douglas Costa 86'	Report		Stadium: Allianz Arena; Attendance: 75,000; Referee: Sascha Stegemann

18 December 2016 15	Darmstadt 98	0–1	Bayern Munich	Darmstadt
15:30 CET (UTC+1)	Rosenthal (yellow card) 43'	Report	Douglas Costa 71'; Hummels (yellow card) 75'; Alonso (yellow card) 75'	Stadium: Jonathan-Heimes-Stadion am Böllenfalltor; Attendance: 17,400; Referee: Bastian Dankert

21 December 2016 16	Bayern Munich	3–0	RB Leipzig	Munich
20:00 CET (UTC+1)	Thiago 17'; Alonso 25'; Lewandowski 45' (pen.); Vidal (yellow card) 56'	Report	Forsberg (red card) 30'; Sabitzer (yellow card) 58'	Stadium: Allianz Arena; Attendance: 75,000; Referee: Felix Zwayer

20 January 2017 17	SC Freiburg	1–2	Bayern Munich	Freiburg im Breisgau
20:30 CET (UTC+1)	Haberer 4', (yellow card) 74'; Schwolow (yellow card) 84'	Report	Alonso (yellow card) 31'; Lewandowski 35', 90+1'; Douglas Costa (yellow card) 48'	Stadium: Schwarzwald-Stadion; Attendance: 24,000; Referee: Manuel Gräfe

28 January 2017 18	Werder Bremen	1–2	Bayern Munich	Bremen
15:30 CET (UTC+1)	Bauer (yellow card) 42'; Kruse 53'; S. García (yellow card) 72'; Junuzović (yellow card) 75'; M. Eggestein (yellow card) 90'	Report	Robben 30'; Alaba 45+1'; Coman (yellow card) 90+3'	Stadium: Weser-Stadion; Attendance: 42,100; Referee: Sascha Stegemann

4 February 2017 19	Bayern Munich	1–1	Schalke 04	Munich
15:30 CET (UTC+1)	Lewandowski 9'; Martínez (yellow card) 77'	Report	Naldo 13'; Bentaleb (yellow card) 61'	Stadium: Allianz Arena; Attendance: 75,000; Referee: Marco Fritz

11 February 2017 20	FC Ingolstadt	0–2	Bayern Munich	Ingolstadt
15:30 CET (UTC+1)	Brégerie (yellow card) 73'; Groß (yellow card) 76'	Report	Lewandowski (yellow card) 73'; Vidal 90'; Robben 90+1'	Stadium: Audi Sportpark; Attendance: 15,200; Referee: Felix Zwayer

18 February 2017 21	Hertha BSC	1–1	Bayern Munich	Berlin
15:30 CET (UTC+1)	Ibišević 21'; Pekarík (yellow card) 90+6'; Jarstein (yellow card) 90+7'	Report	Hummels (yellow card) 64'; Lewandowski (yellow card) 66', (goal) 90+6'; Alonso (yellow card) 68'	Stadium: Olympiastadion Berlin; Attendance: 74,667; Referee: Patrick Ittrich

25 February 2017 22	Bayern Munich	8–0	Hamburger SV	Munich
15:30 CET (UTC+1)	Vidal 17'; Lewandowski 24' (pen.), 42', 54'; Alaba 56'; Coman 65', 69'; Robben 87'	Report	Douglas Santos (yellow card) 37'	Stadium: Allianz Arena; Attendance: 75,000; Referee: Bastian Dankert

4 March 2017 23	1. FC Köln	0–3	Bayern Munich	Cologne
15:30 CET (UTC+1)		Report	Martínez 25'; Vidal (yellow card) 34'; Bernat 48', (yellow card) 79'; Ribéry 90'	Stadium: RheinEnergieSTADION; Attendance: 50,000; Referee: Jochen Drees

11 March 2017 24	Bayern Munich	3–0	Eintracht Frankfurt	Munich
15:30 CET (UTC+1)	Vidal (yellow card) 36'; Lewandowski 38', 55'; Douglas Costa 41'; Alaba (yellow card) 56'	Report	Rebić (yellow card) 23'; Mascarell (yellow card) 36'; Hasebe (yellow card) 45+2'	Stadium: Allianz Arena; Attendance: 75,000; Referee: Markus Schmidt

19 March 2017 25	Borussia Mönchengladbach	0–1	Bayern Munich	Mönchengladbach
17:30 CET (UTC+1)		Report	Alonso (yellow card) 56'; Müller 63'; Martínez (yellow card) 87'	Stadium: BORUSSIA-PARK; Attendance: 54,014; Referee: Tobias Stieler

1 April 2017 26	Bayern Munich	6–0	FC Augsburg	Munich
15:30 CEST (UTC+2)	Lewandowski 17', 55', 79'; Müller 36', 80'; Thiago 62'	Report	Kohr (yellow card) 12'; Janker (yellow card) 81'	Stadium: Allianz Arena; Attendance: 75,000; Referee: Christian Dingert

4 April 2017 27	1899 Hoffenheim	1–0	Bayern Munich	Sinsheim
20:00 CEST (UTC+2)	Kramarić 21'	Report	Lewandowski (yellow card) 64'	Stadium: WIRSOL Rhein-Neckar-Arena; Attendance: 30,150; Referee: Sascha Stegemann

8 April 2017 28	Bayern Munich	4–1	Borussia Dortmund	Munich
18:30 CEST (UTC+2)	Ribéry 4'; Lewandowski 10', 68' (pen.), (yellow card) 24'; Robben 49'; Vidal (yellow card) 63'	Report	Guerreiro 20'; Passlack (yellow card) 36'; Bartra (yellow card) 45+1'; Bürki (yellow card) 68'	Stadium: Allianz Arena; Attendance: 75,000; Referee: Marco Fritz

15 April 2017 29	Bayer Leverkusen	0–0	Bayern Munich	Leverkusen
18:30 CEST (UTC+2)	Aránguiz (yellow card) 37'; Jedvaj (yellow card) 50' (yellow-red card) 59'	Report		Stadium: BayArena; Attendance: 30,210; Referee: Daniel Siebert

22 April 2017 30	Bayern Munich	2–2	Mainz 05	Munich
15:30 CEST (UTC+2)	Robben 16'; Rafinha (yellow card) 43'; Thiago 73'	Report	Bojan 3'; Brosinski 40' (pen.); Onisiwo (yellow card) 89'	Stadium: Allianz Arena; Attendance: 75,000; Referee: Frank Willenborg

29 April 2017 31	VfL Wolfsburg	0–6	Bayern Munich	Wolfsburg
18:30 CEST (UTC+2)	Luiz Gustavo (yellow card) 19' (yellow-red card) 78'	Report	Alaba 19'; Lewandowski 36', 45'; Robben 66'; Müller 80'; Kimmich 85'	Stadium: VOLKSWAGEN ARENA; Attendance: 30,000; Referee: Felix Zwayer

6 May 2017 32	Bayern Munich	1–0	Darmstadt 98	Munich
15:30 CEST (UTC+2)	Bernat 18'; Rafinha (yellow card) 86'	Report	Sirigu (yellow card) 61'	Stadium: Allianz Arena; Attendance: 75,000; Referee: Guido Winkmann

13 May 2017 33	RB Leipzig	4–5	Bayern Munich	Leipzig
15:30 CEST (UTC+2)	Sabitzer 2'; Werner 29' (pen.), 65'; Poulsen 47'; Keïta (yellow card) 90+6'	Report	Lewandowski 17' (pen.), 84'; Alonso (yellow card) 28'; Vidal (yellow card) 64'; Douglas Costa (yellow card) 64'; Thiago 60', (yellow card) 72'; Boateng (yellow card) 77'; Alaba 90+1'; Robben 90+5'	Stadium: Red Bull Arena; Attendance: 42,558; Referee: Tobias Stieler

20 May 2017 34	Bayern Munich	4–1	SC Freiburg	Munich
15:30 CEST (UTC+2)	Robben 4'; Vidal (yellow card) 53', (goal) 73'; Ribéry 90+1'; Kimmich 90+4'	Report	Petersen 76'	Stadium: Allianz Arena; Attendance: 75,000; Referee: Jochen Drees

=== DFB-Pokal ===
19 August 2016 First round	Carl Zeiss Jena	0–5	Bayern Munich	Jena
20:45 CEST (UTC+2)	Kühne (yellow card) 26'; Eismann (yellow card) 86'	Report	Lewandowski 3', 34', 43'; Vidal 72'; Hummels 77'	Stadium: Ernst-Abbe-Sportfeld; Attendance: 19,000; Referee: Harm Osmers

26 October 2016 Second round	Bayern Munich	3–1	FC Augsburg	Munich
20:45 CEST (UTC+2)	Lahm 2'; Green 41'; Coman (yellow card) 82'; Alaba 90+3'	Report	Baier (yellow card) 27'; Kohr (yellow card) 52'; Ji 68'	Stadium: Allianz Arena; Attendance: 73,500; Referee: Sascha Stegemann

7 February 2017 Round of 16	Bayern Munich	1–0	VfL Wolfsburg	Munich
20:45 CET (UTC+1)	Douglas Costa 18'; Robben (yellow card) 72'	Report	Luiz Gustavo (yellow card) 57'; Rodríguez (yellow card) 90+3'	Stadium: Allianz Arena; Attendance: 73,500; Referee: Jochen Drees

1 March 2017 Quarter-finals	Bayern Munich	3–0	Schalke 04	Munich
20:45 CET (UTC+1)	Lewandowski 3', 29'; Thiago 16'; Ribéry (yellow card) 31'	Report	Badstuber (yellow card) 74' (yellow-red card) 77'	Stadium: Allianz Arena; Attendance: 75,000; Referee: Daniel Siebert

26 April 2017 Semi-finals	Bayern Munich	2–3	Borussia Dortmund	Munich
20:45 CEST (UTC+2)	Martínez 28'; Robben (yellow card) 31'; Hummels 41'; Alonso (yellow card) 78'	Report	Weigl (yellow card) 14'; Reus 19'; Dembélé (yellow card) 25', (goal) 74'; Aubameyang 69'; Bürki (yellow card) 90+4'	Stadium: Allianz Arena; Attendance: 75,000; Referee: Manuel Gräfe

=== DFL-Supercup ===
14 August 2016 Final	Borussia Dortmund	0–2	Bayern Munich	Dortmund
20:30 CEST (UTC+2)	Passlack (yellow card) 29'; Dembélé (yellow card) 39'; Rode (yellow card) 61'	Report	Martínez (yellow card) 10'; Alonso (yellow card) 29'; Ribéry (yellow card) 29'; Vidal 58'; Müller 79'	Stadium: Signal Iduna Park; Attendance: 81,360; Referee: Tobias Welz

=== UEFA Champions League ===
==== Group stage ====
Pos	Team	Pld	W	D	L	GF	GA	GD	Pts	Qualification	ATM	BAY	RST	PSV
1	(Spain) Atlético Madrid	6	5	0	1	7	2	+5	15	Advance to knockout phase	—	1–0	2–1	2–0
2	(Germany) Bayern Munich	6	4	0	2	14	6	+8	12	Advance to knockout phase	1–0	—	5–0	4–1
3	(Russia) Rostov	6	1	2	3	6	12	−6	5	Transfer to Europa League	0–1	3–2	—	2–2
4	(Netherlands) PSV Eindhoven	6	0	2	4	4	11	−7	2		0–1	1–2	0–0	—

Source: UEFA
Rules for classification: Group stage tiebreakers

13 September 2016 1	Bayern Munich (Germany)	5–0	(Russia) Rostov	Munich, Germany
20:45 CEST (UTC+2)	Lewandowski 28' (pen.); Müller 45+2'; Kimmich 53', 60'; Bernat 90'	Report		Stadium: Allianz Arena; Attendance: 70,000; Referee: Anthony Taylor (England)

28 September 2016 2	Atlético Madrid (Spain)	1–0	(Germany) Bayern Munich	Madrid, Spain
20:45 CEST (UTC+2)	Saúl (yellow card) 15'; Carrasco 35'	Report	Lahm (yellow card) 26'; Thiago (yellow card) 33'; Boateng (yellow card) 40'; Vidal (yellow card) 85'	Stadium: Vicente Calderón; Attendance: 48,242; Referee: Szymon Marciniak (Poland)

19 October 2016 3	Bayern Munich (Germany)	4–1	(Netherlands) PSV Eindhoven	Munich, Germany
20:45 CEST (UTC+2)	Müller 13'; Kimmich 21'; Lahm (yellow card) 57'; Lewandowski 59'; Robben 84'	Report	Narsingh 41'	Stadium: Allianz Arena; Attendance: 70,000; Referee: Willie Collum (Scotland)

1 November 2016 4	PSV Eindhoven (Netherlands)	1–2	(Germany) Bayern Munich	Eindhoven, Netherlands
20:45 CET (UTC+1)	Arias 14'	Report	Lewandowski 34' (pen.), 74'; Coman (yellow card) 90'	Stadium: Philips Stadion; Attendance: 35,000; Referee: Gianluca Rocchi (Italy)

23 November 2016 5	Rostov (Russia)	3–2	(Germany) Bayern Munich	Rostov-on-Don, Russia
20:00 MSK (UTC+3); 18:00 CET (UTC+1)	Granat (yellow card) 30'; Azmoun 44'; Poloz 50' (pen.); Gațcan (yellow card) 57'; Noboa 67'	Report	Douglas Costa 35'; Boateng (yellow card) 48'; Bernat 52'	Stadium: Olimp-2; Attendance: 15,211; Referee: Artur Soares Dias (Portugal)

6 December 2016 6	Bayern Munich (Germany)	1–0	(Spain) Atlético Madrid	Munich, Germany
20:45 CET (UTC+1)	Lewandowski 28'	Report	Gabi (yellow card) 61'	Stadium: Allianz Arena; Attendance: 70,000; Referee: Clément Turpin (France)

==== Knockout phase ====
===== Round of 16 =====
15 February 2017 First leg	Bayern Munich (Germany)	5–1	(England) Arsenal	Munich, Germany
20:45 CET (UTC+1)	Robben 11'; Hummels (yellow card) 26'; Lewandowski 53'; Thiago 56', 63'; Lahm (yellow card) 83'; Müller 88'	Report	Mustafi (yellow card) 15'; Sánchez (penalty missed) 30', 30', (yellow card) 33'; Xhaka (yellow card) 60'	Stadium: Allianz Arena; Attendance: 70,000; Referee: Milorad Mažić (Serbia)

7 March 2017 Second leg	Arsenal (England)	1–5 (2–10 agg.)	(Germany) Bayern Munich	London, England
19:45 GMT (UTC); 20:45 CET (UTC+1)	Walcott 20', (yellow card) 39'; Koscielny (red card) 53'; Chamberlain (yellow card) 61'; Xhaka (yellow card) 78'	Report	Alaba (yellow card) 39'; Martínez (yellow card) 44'; Lewandowski 55' (pen.); Robben 68'; Douglas Costa 78'; Vidal 80', 85'	Stadium: Emirates Stadium; Attendance: 59,911; Referee: Anastasios Sidiropoulos (Greece)

===== Quarter-finals =====
12 April 2017 First leg	Bayern Munich (Germany)	1–2	(Spain) Real Madrid	Munich, Germany
20:45 CEST (UTC+2)	Vidal 25', (penalty missed) 45+1', (yellow card) 90'; Alonso (yellow card) 47'; Martínez (yellow card) 58' (yellow-red card) 61'	Report	Kroos (yellow card) 44'; Carvajal (yellow card) 45'; Ronaldo 47', 77'	Stadium: Allianz Arena; Attendance: 70,000; Referee: Nicola Rizzoli (Italy)

18 April 2017 Second leg	Real Madrid (Spain)	4–2 (a.e.t.) (6–3 agg.)	(Germany) Bayern Munich	Madrid, Spain
20:45 CEST (UTC+2)	Casemiro (yellow card) 40'; Ronaldo 76', 105', 110'; Asensio 112'	Report	Vidal (yellow card) 6' (yellow-red card) 84'; Lewandowski 53' (pen.); Alonso (yellow card) 70'; Hummels (yellow card) 75'; Ramos 78' (o.g.); Robben (yellow card) 101'	Stadium: Santiago Bernabéu; Attendance: 78,346; Referee: Viktor Kassai (Hungary)

== Squad statistics ==
=== Appearances and goals ===
As of 20 May 2017

No.	Pos	Player	Bundesliga		DFB-Pokal		DFL-Supercup		Champions League		Total	
No.	Pos	Player	Apps	Goals	Apps	Goals	Apps	Goals	Apps	Goals	Apps	Goals
1	GK	(Germany) Manuel Neuer	26	0	4	0	1	0	9	0	40	0
5	DF	(Germany) Mats Hummels	27	1	5	2	1	0	9	0	42	3
6	MF	(Spain) Thiago	27	5	4	1	1	0	9	2	41	8
7	MF	(France) Franck Ribéry	22	4	3	0	1	0	6	0	32	4
8	MF	(Spain) Javi Martínez	25	1	4	1	1	0	7	0	37	2
9	FW	(Poland) Robert Lewandowski	33	30	4	5	1	0	9	8	47	43
10	MF	(Netherlands) Arjen Robben	26	10	3	0	0	0	8	3	37	13
11	MF	(Brazil) Douglas Costa	23	4	2	1	0	0	9	2	34	7
13	DF	(Brazil) Rafinha	20	1	2	0	0	0	5	0	27	1
14	MF	(Spain) Xabi Alonso	27	3	3	0	1	0	7	0	38	3
17	DF	(Germany) Jérôme Boateng	13	0	2	0	0	0	6	0	21	0
18	DF	(Spain) Juan Bernat	18	1	3	0	1	0	4	2	26	3
21	DF	(Germany) Philipp Lahm	26	1	4	1	1	0	7	0	38	2
22	GK	(Germany) Tom Starke	3	0	0	0	0	0	0	0	3	0
23	MF	(Chile) Arturo Vidal	27	3	5	1	1	1	8	3	41	8
25	FW	(Germany) Thomas Müller	29	4	3	0	1	1	9	3	42	8
26	GK	(Germany) Sven Ulreich	5	0	1	0	0	0	1	0	7	0
27	DF	(Austria) David Alaba	32	2	5	1	1	0	9	0	47	3
29	FW	(France) Kingsley Coman	19	2	3	0	1	0	2	0	25	2
30	MF	(Germany) Niklas Dorsch	0	0	0	0	0	0	0	0	0	0
32	MF	(Germany) Joshua Kimmich	27	4	4	0	1	0	8	3	40	7
35	MF	(Portugal) Renato Sanches	17	0	2	0	0	0	6	0	25	0
40	MF	(Germany) Fabian Benko	0	0	1	0	0	0	0	0	1	0
Players transferred out during the season
28	DF	(Germany) Holger Badstuber	1	0	1	0	0	0	1	0	3	0
37	FW	(United States) Julian Green	0	0	2	1	0	0	0	0	2	1

=== Goalscorers ===
As of 20 May 2017

Rank	Position	Player	Bundesliga	DFB-Pokal	DFL-Supercup	Champions League	Total
1	FW	(Poland) Robert Lewandowski	30	5	0	8	43
2	MF	(Netherlands) Arjen Robben	13	0	0	3	16
3	MF	(Germany) Joshua Kimmich	6	0	0	3	9
3	FW	(Germany) Thomas Müller	5	0	1	3	9
3	MF	(Spain) Thiago	6	1	0	2	9
3	MF	(Chile) Arturo Vidal	4	1	1	3	9
7	MF	(Brazil) Douglas Costa	4	1	0	2	7
8	DF	(Austria) David Alaba	4	1	0	0	5
8	MF	(France) Franck Ribéry	5	0	0	0	5
10	DF	(Spain) Juan Bernat	2	0	0	2	4
11	MF	(Spain) Xabi Alonso	3	0	0	0	3
11	DF	(Germany) Mats Hummels	1	2	0	0	3
13	FW	(France) Kingsley Coman	2	0	0	0	2
13	DF	(Germany) Philipp Lahm	1	1	0	0	2
13	MF	(Spain) Javi Martínez	1	1	0	0	2
16	FW	(United States) Julian Green	0	1	0	0	1
16	DF	(Brazil) Rafinha	1	0	0	0	1
Own goal			1	0	0	1	2
Total			89	14	2	27	132

=== Clean sheets ===
As of 6 May 2017

Rank	Player	Bundesliga	DFB-Pokal	DFL-Supercup	Champions League	Total
1	(Germany) Manuel Neuer	14	3	1	2	20
2	(Germany) Sven Ulreich	2	0	0	0	2
3	(Germany) Tom Starke	1	0	0	0	1
Total		17	3	1	2	23

=== Disciplinary record ===
As of 26 April 2017

Rank	Position	Player	Bundesliga			DFB-Pokal			DFL-Supercup			Champions League			Total		
Rank	Position	Player	Yellow card	(yellow card) (yellow-red card)	Red card	Yellow card	(yellow card) (yellow-red card)	Red card	Yellow card	(yellow card) (yellow-red card)	Red card	Yellow card	(yellow card) (yellow-red card)	Red card	Yellow card	(yellow card) (yellow-red card)	Red card
1	MF	(Chile) Arturo Vidal	6	0	0	0	0	0	0	0	0	2	1	0	8	1	0
2	MF	(Spain) Javi Martínez	5	0	0	0	0	0	1	0	0	1	1	0	7	1	0
3	MF	(Spain) Xabi Alonso	5	0	0	1	0	0	1	0	0	2	0	0	9	0	0
4	DF	(Germany) Mats Hummels	4	0	0	0	0	0	0	0	0	2	0	0	6	0	0
5	FW	(Poland) Robert Lewandowski	5	0	0	0	0	0	0	0	0	0	0	0	5	0	0
6	DF	(Germany) Philipp Lahm	1	0	0	0	0	0	0	0	0	3	0	0	4	0	0
6	MF	(France) Franck Ribéry	2	0	0	1	0	0	1	0	0	0	0	0	4	0	0
6	MF	(Spain) Thiago	3	0	0	0	0	0	0	0	0	1	0	0	4	0	0
9	FW	(France) Kingsley Coman	1	0	0	1	0	0	0	0	0	1	0	0	3	0	0
9	MF	(Netherlands) Arjen Robben	0	0	0	2	0	0	0	0	0	1	0	0	3	0	0
9	MF	(Portugal) Renato Sanches	3	0	0	0	0	0	0	0	0	0	0	0	3	0	0
12	DF	(Austria) David Alaba	1	0	0	0	0	0	0	0	0	1	0	0	2	0	0
12	DF	(Germany) Jérôme Boateng	0	0	0	0	0	0	0	0	0	2	0	0	2	0	0
14	DF	(Spain) Juan Bernat	1	0	0	0	0	0	0	0	0	0	0	0	1	0	0
14	MF	(Brazil) Douglas Costa	1	0	0	0	0	0	0	0	0	0	0	0	1	0	0
14	MF	(Germany) Joshua Kimmich	1	0	0	0	0	0	0	0	0	0	0	0	1	0	0
14	DF	(Brazil) Rafinha	1	0	0	0	0	0	0	0	0	0	0	0	1	0	0
Total			40	0	0	5	0	0	3	0	0	16	2	0	64	2	0
