= Javi Martínez =

Spanish footballer (born 1988)

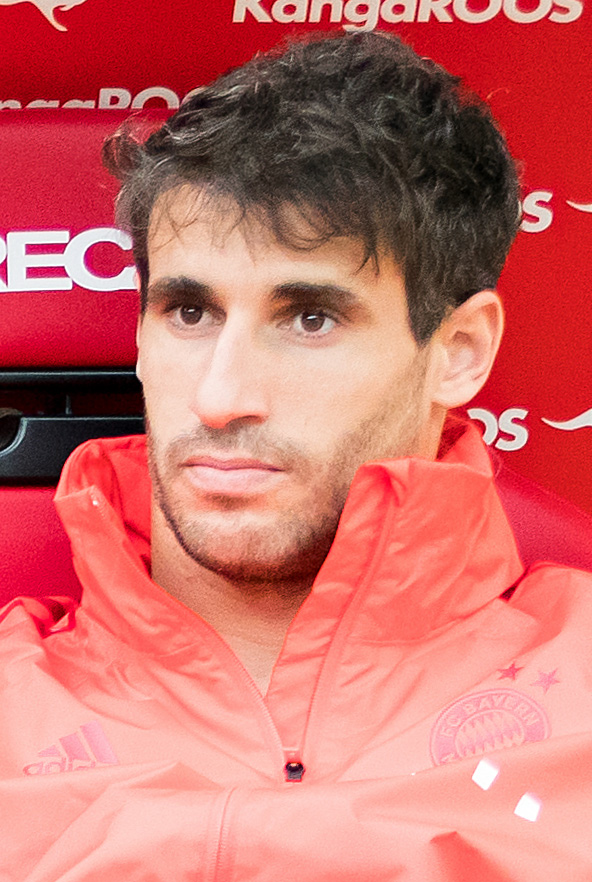
- Martínez with Bayern Munich in 2019

Personal information
- Full name: Javier Martínez Aginaga
- Date of birth: 2 September 1988 (age 38)
- Place of birth: Estella, Spain (Note: According to some sources he was born in Estella, in others Ayegui; different pages of his personal website give both locations.)
- Height: 1.89 m (6 ft 2 in)
- Positions: Defensive midfielder; centre-back

Youth career
- 1993–1995: Berceo
- 1995–1997: Logroñés
- 1997–2000: Arenas de Ayegui
- 2000: Izarra
- 2001–2005: Osasuna

Senior career*
Years	Team	Apps	(Gls)
2005–2006	Osasuna B	32	(3)
2006–2012	Athletic Bilbao	201	(22)
2012–2021	Bayern Munich	165	(9)
2021–2025	Qatar SC	77	(11)
2025–2026	Al Bidda	10	(0)

International career
2005	Spain U17	5	(0)
2006–2007	Spain U19	5	(0)
2007–2011	Spain U21	24	(1)
2012	Spain Olympic (O.P.)	4	(1)
2010–2014	Spain	18	(0)
2006–2010	Basque Country	2	(0)
Medal record
Representing Spain
Men's football
FIFA World Cup
Winner	2010 South Africa
UEFA European Championship
Winner	2012 Poland–Ukraine
FIFA Confederations Cup
Runner-up	2013 Brazil
- * Club domestic league appearances and goals as of 20 July 2026

Javier Martínez Aginaga (Spanish pronunciation: [xaˈβjeɾ ˈxaβi maɾˈtineθ aɣiˈnaɣa]; born 2 September 1988) is a Spanish former professional footballer who played as a defensive midfielder.

He arrived at Athletic Bilbao in 2006, before his 18th birthday, quickly imposing himself as a starter and going on to make 251 appearances over the course of six La Liga seasons, scoring 26 goals. In 2012, he signed for Bayern Munich for €40 million, going on to win nine consecutive Bundesliga titles as well as the UEFA Champions League in 2013 and 2020.

A Spanish international, Martínez was a member of the squads that won the 2010 FIFA World Cup and UEFA Euro 2012, and also played at the 2014 FIFA World Cup.

== Club career ==
=== Athletic Bilbao ===
Martínez was born in Estella, Navarre and raised in the nearby village of Ayegui; and was a promising basketball player in his youth. Athletic Bilbao signed him as a raw 17-year-old for €6 million in the summer of 2006, from fellow La Liga club Osasuna, despite him never having played a game with the first-team; he had scored three goals in 32 appearances for the reserve team.

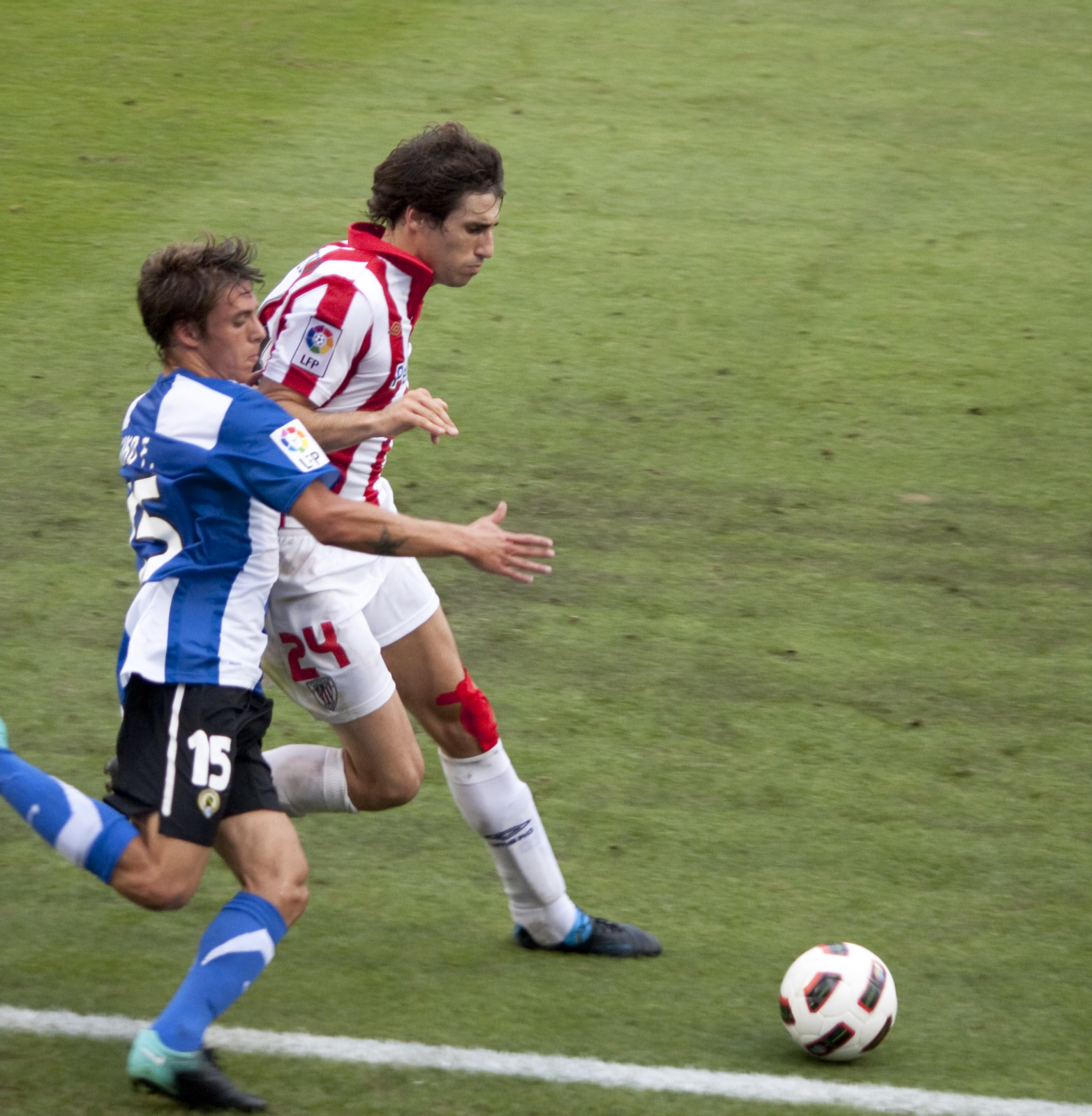
Martínez (right) playing for Athletic Bilbao in 2010

Martínez soon became a regular in his debut season with powerful displays, his highlight being scoring twice against in a 2–0 away win against Deportivo La Coruña on 16 December 2006, and finished with 35 games and three goals. He was ever-present again over the following two years, helping Athletic to the final of the Copa del Rey in 2009.

In the 2009–10 season, Martínez was the midfield engine once more– 46 official matches, nine goals – and netted a career-best six times in the league campaign as the side narrowly missed on another qualification to the UEFA Europa League. In the 2011–12 season, under new manager Marcelo Bielsa, he began to be used regularly as a central defender, making 50 starts in the demanding role and receiving three red cards during the latter season, which saw them reach another domestic cup final as well as the decisive game in the UEFA Europa League, only to lose both matches 3–0.

=== Bayern Munich ===
==== 2012–13 season ====
On 29 August 2012, after Bayern Munich paid the buyout clause of €40 million in his contract, Martínez signed a five-year contract with the German club. He thus became the transfer record in the 50-year history of the Bundesliga. Martínez made his debut on 2 September – the day of his 24th birthday – coming on as a 77th minute substitute for Bastian Schweinsteiger in a 6–1 home win over VfB Stuttgart. He scored his first goal for his new club against Hannover 96 on 24 November, netting the opener in an eventual 5–0 home triumph through a bicycle kick.

Martínez scored his second goal for Bayern in their 6–1 demolition of Werder Bremen on 23 February 2013, heading home from an Arjen Robben free-kick to make the score 2–0 after 30 minutes. Following the team's impressive 4–0 victory over Barcelona in the first-leg of their UEFA Champions League semi-final clash on 23 April, he was lauded by many pundits for his all-around display and was credited as the key man in breaking up the tiki-taka football of national teammates Xavi and Andrés Iniesta; in the final game of his first season, he netted the first goal as the club came back from 0–2 and 1–3 down to win it 4–3 at Borussia Mönchengladbach. He finished the season with three goals in 43 appearances.

==== 2013–14 season ====
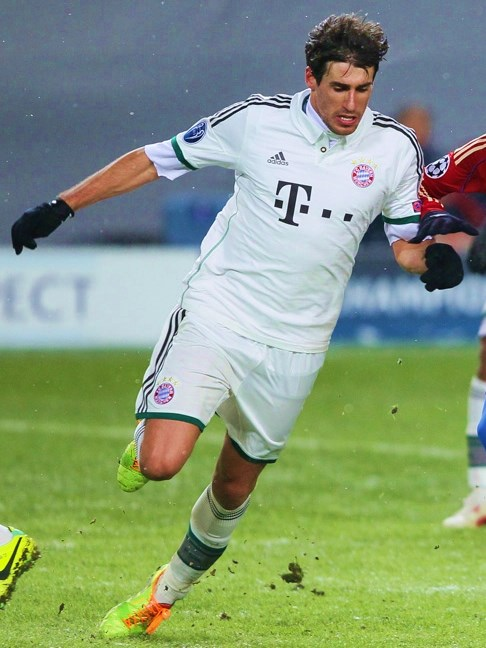
Martínez playing for Bayern Munich in 2013

Martínez started the 2013–14 campaign on the substitutes bench, under new manager Pep Guardiola. On 30 August 2013, in that year's UEFA Super Cup, he took the pitch early into the second-half of the match against Chelsea, and scored the 2–2 equalizer in the last minute of extra-time, as the Bavarians went on to win the trophy in Prague after a penalty shootout. He finished the season with one goal in 34 appearances.

==== 2014–15 season ====
On 13 August 2014, Martínez tore the ligaments on his left knee 30 minutes into the German Super Cup encounter against Borussia Dortmund (eventual 0–2 loss), going on to miss the vast majority of the season. He returned to action on 2 May 2015, starting in central defence in a 2–0 league defeat against Bayer Leverkusen. Ten days later, he came on as an 87th-minute substitute in the Champions League semi-final second leg against Barcelona. In addition to playing in the German Super Cup, He also played in one Bundesliga match and one Champions League match.

==== 2015–16 season ====
Martínez made his first appearance of the 2015–16 season on 19 September 2015, featuring 24 minutes and being booked in a 3–0 win against Darmstadt 98. His first start of the campaign came as a stopper in a 3–0 defeat of Mainz 05, the following matchday.

On 4 October 2015, Martínez played 90 minutes for the first time in one year and five months, in a 5–1 Klassiker win against Borussia Dortmund. On 18 December he signed a new contract, keeping him at the club until 2021. He finished the season with a goal in 27 appearances.

==== 2016–17 season ====
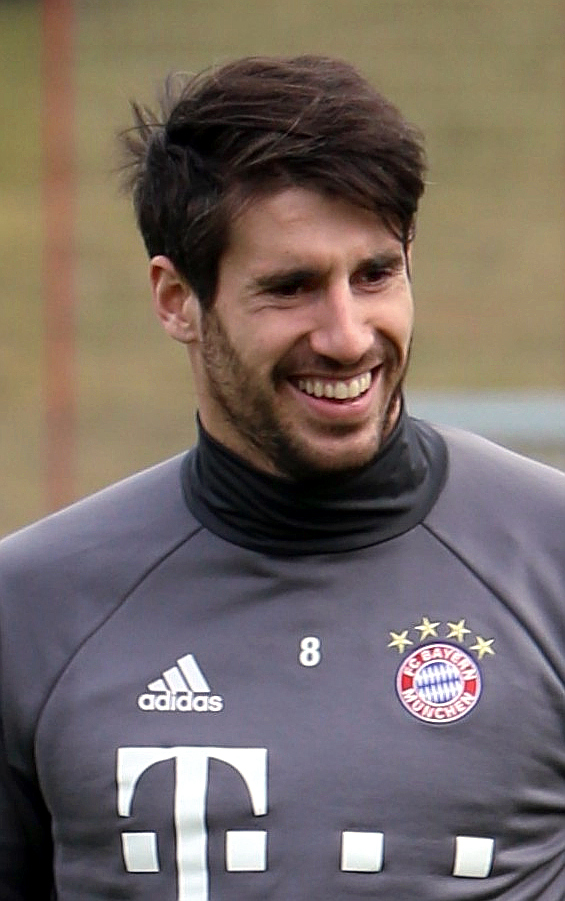
Martínez training with Bayern Munich in 2017

Martínez started the 2016–17 season by playing in the German Super Cup. He finished the season with two goals in 37 appearances.

==== 2017–18 season ====
Martínez started the 2017–18 season by playing in the German Super Cup. On 31 October 2017, Martínez scored the winning goal in a 2–1 away victory over Celtic during the Champions League group stage, which confirmed Bayern's passage to the knockout phase. In the process, he sustained a cut to his face in a clash of heads with Nir Bitton; it was his first ever goal in European competitions, in 59 appearances. He finished the season with two goals in 37 appearances.

==== 2018–19 season ====
Martínez started the 2018–19 season by winning the German Super Cup as Bayern defeated Eintracht Frankfurt with a 5–0 victory. On 19 January 2019, following a 3–1 win over Hoffenheim, he reached 100 Bundesliga wins with Bayern Munich in his 120th appearance for the club, breaking the record previously held by Arjen Robben, who took 126 matches.

On 18 May 2019, Martínez won his seventh consecutive Bundesliga title as Bayern finished two points above Borussia Dortmund with 78 points. A week later, Martínez won his fourth DFB-Pokal as Bayern defeated RB Leipzig 3–0 in the final. He finished the season with four goals in 33 appearances.

==== 2019–20 season ====
He made a total of 24 appearances in the 2019–20 treble-winning season.

==== 2020–21 season ====
On 24 September 2020, Martínez (at that time heavily linked in the media with a return to Athletic Bilbao) scored in extra-time to win the 2020 UEFA Super Cup for Bayern Munich with a 2–1 victory over Sevilla; it was his second goal in two appearances in the UEFA Super Cup. Having scored the decisive goal once again in extra-time for Bayern as he did earlier in the 2013 final against Chelsea in the UEFA Super Cup, he famously earned the nickname of "Mr. Super Cup" (later made famous in the sports media) from his teammate Thomas Müller who became Man of the Match. On 4 May 2021, Bayern announced that Martínez would be leaving the club at the end of the season, since both parties agreed not to extend his contract.

=== Qatar SC ===
On 20 June 2021, Martínez signed for Qatar Stars League club Qatar SC on a three-year deal starting on 1 July. On 4 August 2024, Martínez signed a one-year contract extension with the club.

=== Al Bidda ===
On 29 July 2025, Martínez joined Al Bidda.

== International career ==
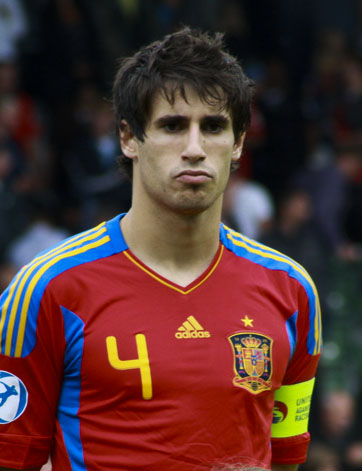
Martínez with Spain U21 in 2011

At the age of 19, Martínez began appearing for Spain's under-21 team, representing the nation at the 2009 UEFA European Championships in Sweden, in a group stage exit. On 20 May 2010, he was named in the senior side's list of 23 for the FIFA World Cup in South Africa, chosen by manager Vicente del Bosque. On 29 May, he made his debut, replacing Barcelona's Xavi in the 74th minute of a 3–2 friendly win against Saudi Arabia, in Innsbruck, Austria; on 3 June he started in another exhibition game, with South Korea (1–0 triumph, in the same venue), playing 80 minutes until he was substituted for David Silva.

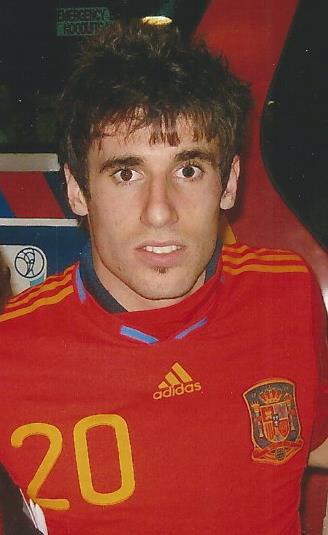
Martínez with Spain in 2010

Martínez played once in the 2010 World Cup, replacing Xabi Alonso for the final 20 minutes of an 2–1 win against Chile in the group stage on 25 June, as Spain emerged victorious in the tournament. He returned to the under-21 setup for the 2011 European Championships in Denmark, captaining the nation to its third title in the category.

Martínez also appeared in one game at UEFA Euro 2012 for the eventual champions, again substituting Alonso midway through the second-half, this time in a 4–0 win against the Republic of Ireland in the group stage. He was described by del Bosque as "a complete player", with the manager comparing him to Patrick Vieira; additionally, he was part of the squad at the 2012 Summer Olympics, which ended in group stage elimination.

Martínez was named in Spain's 30-man provisional squad for the 2014 FIFA World Cup, as well as the final 23-man squad for the tournament. He made his debut in the tournament in the group stage, against Chile in Maracanã starting in place of Gerard Piqué in a 0–2 defeat that confirmed elimination for the defending world-champions.

== Style of play ==
Martínez is a versatile player who can play both as a holding midfielder and as a centre-back; he is also capable of playing as a sweeper in a three-man back-line in a 3–4–3 or 3–5–2 formation, due to his ability to play the ball out from the back. His versatility enabled Bayern Munich's effective adoption of a flexible tactical approach under Pep Guardiola, allowing the team to switch between different formations throughout the course of a single match. In addition to his good tackling, physical power, ability in the air, and defensive awareness, Martínez has also stood out for his passing ability, technique, and vision, as well as his strong mentality, which also enable him to play in a variety of midfield roles, including as a deep-lying playmaker. Ahead of Euro 2012, Garth Crooks described Martínez as "as silky as a bar of Toblerone."

== Personal life ==
Martínez's older brother, Álvaro, was also a footballer, who played as a defender. Having played mainly in the lower leagues, he had a brief spell in the second division with Eibar. Javi has cited Álvaro as being a positive influence over his early career.

In addition to his native Spanish, Martínez also speaks German and English.

== Career statistics ==
=== Club ===
As of match played 18 April 2024

Club	Season	League			National cup (Note: Includes Copa del Rey, DFB-Pokal, Emir of Qatar Cup)		Continental		Other		Total	
Club	Season	Division	Apps	Goals	Apps	Goals	Apps	Goals	Apps	Goals	Apps	Goals
Osasuna B	2005–06	Segunda División B	32	3	—		—		—		32	3
Athletic Bilbao	2006–07	La Liga	35	3	1	0	—		—		36	3
Athletic Bilbao	2007–08	La Liga	34	0	2	0	—		—		36	0
Athletic Bilbao	2008–09	La Liga	32	5	9	1	—		—		41	6
Athletic Bilbao	2009–10	La Liga	34	6	1	1	11 (Note: Appearances in UEFA Europa League)	2	—		46	9
Athletic Bilbao	2010–11	La Liga	35	4	3	0	—		—		38	4
Athletic Bilbao	2011–12	La Liga	31	4	9	0	14	0	—		54	4
Athletic Bilbao	Total		201	22	25	2	25	2	—		251	26
Bayern Munich	2012–13	Bundesliga	27	3	5	0	11 (Note: Appearance(s) in UEFA Champions League)	0	0	0	43	3
Bayern Munich	2013–14	Bundesliga	18	0	5	0	8	0	3 (Note: One appearance and one goal in UEFA Super Cup, two appearances in FIFA Club World Cup)	1	34	1
Bayern Munich	2014–15	Bundesliga	1	0	0	0	1	0	1 (Note: Appearance in DFL-Supercup)	0	3	0
Bayern Munich	2015–16	Bundesliga	16	1	3	0	8	0	0	0	27	1
Bayern Munich	2016–17	Bundesliga	25	1	4	1	7	0	1	0	37	2
Bayern Munich	2017–18	Bundesliga	22	1	4	0	10	1	1	0	37	2
Bayern Munich	2018–19	Bundesliga	21	3	5	0	6	1	1	0	33	4
Bayern Munich	2019–20	Bundesliga	16	0	1	0	7	0	0	0	24	0
Bayern Munich	2020–21	Bundesliga	19	0	1	0	8	0	2 (Note: One appearance in DFL-Supercup, one appearance and one goal in UEFA Super Cup)	1	30	1
Bayern Munich	Total		165	9	28	1	66	2	9	2	268	14
Qatar SC	2021–22	Qatar Stars League	21	3	2	1	—		0	0	23	4
Qatar SC	2022–23	Qatar Stars League	17	1	3	1	—		0	0	20	2
Qatar SC	2023–24	Qatar Stars League	16	4	0	0	—		0	0	16	4
Qatar SC	Total		54	8	5	2	—		0	0	59	10
Career total			452	42	58	5	91	4	9	2	610	53

=== International ===
Spain
Year	Apps	Goals
2010	3	0
2011	4	0
2012	2	0
2013	5	0
2014	4	0
Total	18	0

== Honours ==
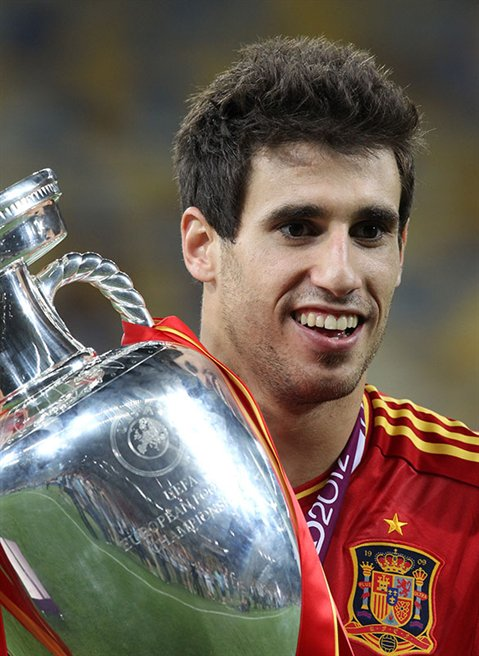
Martínez with the Euro 2012 trophy

Athletic Bilbao

- Copa del Rey runner-up: 2008–09, 2011–12
- UEFA Europa League runner-up: 2011–12

Bayern Munich

- Bundesliga: 2012–13, 2013–14, 2014–15, 2015–16, 2016–17, 2017–18, 2018–19, 2019–20, 2020–21
- DFB-Pokal: 2012–13, 2013–14, 2015–16, 2018–19, 2019–20
- DFL-Supercup: 2016, 2017, 2018, 2020
- UEFA Champions League: 2012–13, 2019–20
- UEFA Super Cup: 2013, 2020
- FIFA Club World Cup: 2013

Spain U19

- UEFA European Under-19 Championship: 2007

Spain U21

- UEFA European Under-21 Championship: 2011

Spain

- FIFA World Cup: 2010
- UEFA European Championship: 2012
- FIFA Confederations Cup runner-up: 2013

Individual

- La Liga Breakthrough Player of the Year: 2010
- UEFA European Under-21 Championship Team of the Tournament: 2011
