= Jan-Christian Dreesen =

German football administrator (born 1967)

Jan-Christian Dreesen (born 4 September 1967) is a German football administrator who is the current chief executive officer of Bayern Munich.

== Career ==
In 1995, after completing a bank apprenticeship, Dreesen began working as an advisor at Bayerische Vereinsbank, becoming a member of the board of directors for private customers and private banking at HypoVereinsbank in 2006.

After the takeover of HVB by the major Italian bank UniCredit, Dreesen resigned just a few weeks after his appointment to the executive committee, before becoming Chairman of the German branch of the major Swiss bank UBS in 2008, responsible for the Wealth Management, Investment Banking and Global Asset Management divisions.

After that, he worked for BayernLB. In February 2013, he was appointed the chief finance officer of German Bundesliga side Bayern Munich, succeeding Karl Hopfner. Dreesen was regarded as an important figure in the most financially successful decade in the club's history. A year later, he became a deputy chairman of the club's board. In August 2016, Dreesen began to represent the club at the board of Ligaverband.

He succeeded Oliver Kahn as CEO of Bayern Munich following the conclusion of the 2022–23 Bundesliga season. In September 2023, he was elected as the vice chairman of the European Club Association until 2027.

== Personal life ==
Dreesen is married and has two sons. He has been a supporter of German side Bayern Munich.
