= Fabian Benko =

Croatian footballer

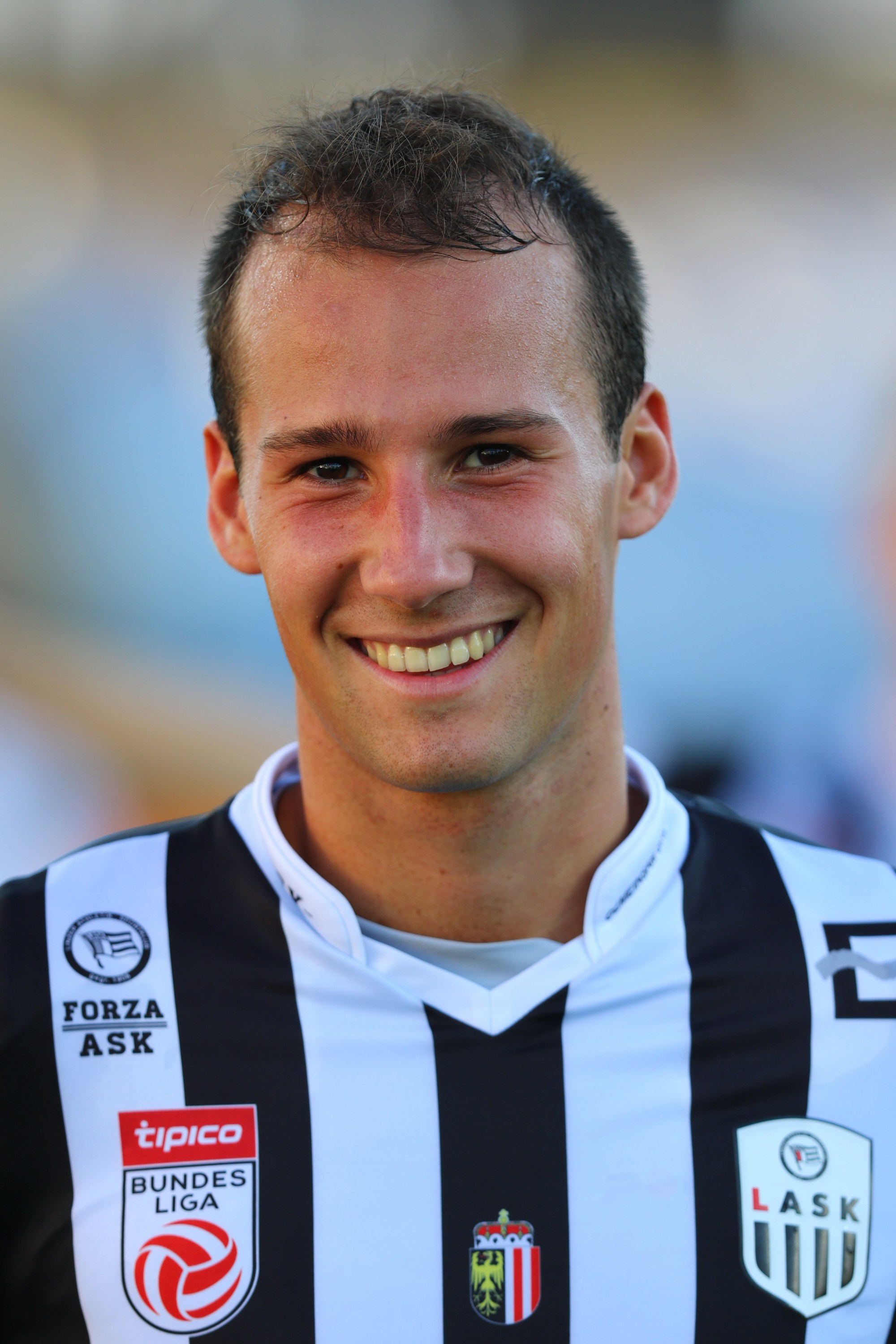
- Benko in 2018

Personal information
- Date of birth: 5 June 1998 (age 28)
- Place of birth: Munich, Germany
- Height: 1.80 m (5 ft 11 in)
- Position: Midfielder

Team information
- Current team: FC Pipinsried
- Number: 20

Youth career
- SV Waldeck Obermenzing
- 2005–2016: Bayern Munich

Senior career*
Years	Team	Apps	(Gls)
2015–2018	Bayern Munich II	84	(6)
2016–2018	Bayern Munich	0	(0)
2018–2021	Juniors OÖ	56	(8)
2018	LASK	3	(0)
2021–2022	SSV Ulm 1846	23	(2)
2022–2023	SG Sonnenhof Großaspach	34	(6)
2023–	FC Pipinsried	35	(8)

International career
2014–2015	Germany U17	2	(0)
2018–2019	Croatia U20	4	(0)
- * Club domestic league appearances and goals as of 20 July 2024

Fabian Benko (born 5 June 1998) is a professional footballer who plays as a midfielder for Bayernliga Süd club FC Pipinsried. Born in Germany, he most recently represented Croatia at youth level.

== Club career ==
=== Bayern Munich ===
Born in Munich to Croatian parents, Benko joined Bayern Munich in 2005 when he was seven years old. He progressed through the club's academy side and was awarded an apprentice contract on 3 September 2015. The terms of the contract came into effect in June the following year with the effect of tying him to the club until 2018. In January 2016, Benko was one of five academy players invited by manager Pep Guardiola to travel with the senior squad to Doha on their mid-season tour and later featured in a pre-season tour of China.

Benko then appeared on the bench for Bayern for the first time in their Champions League match against Dinamo Zagreb on 12 December 2015 where he remained an unused substitute. Had he taken to the field he would have become the club's youngest ever player. He returned to and featured predominantly for Bayern's reserve side, Bayern Munich II, thereafter but his made his senior debut and only first team appearance on 19 August 2016, coming off the bench for Arturo Vidal in Bayern's 5–0 DFB-Pokal win over Carl Zeiss Jena.

=== LASK ===
On 5 June 2018, Benko was transferred to Austrian Bundesliga side LASK on a free transfer where he signed a three-year contract. The following month he was one of 100 players nominated for the Golden Boy award. Benko made his professional debut on 29 July 2018, coming on as a substitute in the 78th minute for Peter Michorl in the 3–1 away loss to Red Bull Salzburg.

=== SSV Ulm ===
Out-of-contract, Benko signed with Regionalliga Südwest side SSV Ulm on 4 August 2021.

== International career ==
=== Youth national teams ===
Benko made his debut for the German U17 national team in 2014. He later elected to represent Croatia at the 2015 FIFA U-17 World Cup. In September 2016, amid discussion surrounding his international future, the Croatian Football Association confirmed that Benko had decided to continue to represent Croatia.

== Career statistics ==
As of 8 November 2019

Appearances and goals by club, season and competition
Club	Season	League			Cup		Total	
Club	Season	Division	Apps	Goals	Apps	Goals	Apps	Goals
Bayern Munich II	2015–16	Regionalliga Bayern	18	0	—		18	0
Bayern Munich II	2016–17	Regionalliga Bayern	32	1	—		32	1
Bayern Munich II	2017–18	Regionalliga Bayern	34	5	—		29	5
Bayern Munich II	Total		84	6	—		84	6
Bayern Munich	2016–17	Bundesliga	0	0	1	0	1	0
LASK	2018–19	Austrian Bundesliga	3	0	2	0	5	0
FC Juniors OÖ	2018–19	2. Liga	5	0	—		5	0
Career total			92	6	3	0	95	6
