= Álvaro Martínez (footballer, born 1979) =

Spanish footballer

Personal information
- Full name: Álvaro Martínez Aguinaga
- Date of birth: 9 February 1979 (age 47)
- Place of birth: Estella, Spain
- Height: 1.80 m (5 ft 11 in)
- Position: Right-back

Youth career
- Izarra
- 1995–1997: Athletic Bilbao

Senior career*
Years	Team	Apps	(Gls)
1997–1998	Basconia	31	(0)
1998–2001	Bilbao Athletic	75	(2)
2001–2004	Alicante	60	(6)
2003	→ Recreación (loan)	1	(0)
2004	River Ega		
2005	Vilanova		
2005–2006	Figueres	33	(1)
2006–2008	Sestao	67	(2)
2008–2009	Eibar	17	(0)
2009–2011	Barakaldo	54	(0)
Total		338+	(11+)
- * Club domestic league appearances and goals

Álvaro Martínez Aguinaga (born 9 February 1979) is a Spanish former professional footballer who played as a right-back.

== Club career ==
Martínez was born in Estella-Lizarra, Navarre. Having spent the vast majority of his career in the lower leagues, he started with Athletic Bilbao but only appeared for its farm team and reserves, CD Basconia and Bilbao Athletic respectively.

From 2001 onwards, Martínez represented Alicante CF, CD Recreación de La Rioja, CD River Ega, CF Vilanova, UE Figueres, Sestao River Club, SD Eibar (his only Segunda División experience, playing 17 matches in 2008–09's relegation) and Barakaldo CF.

== Personal life ==
Martínez's younger brother, Javier, was also a footballer. A midfielder, he played with great success for Athletic Bilbao and FC Bayern Munich, winning the 2010 FIFA World Cup and UEFA Euro 2012 with Spain.

== Honours ==
Basconia

- Tercera División: 1997–98
