= 2016 DFL-Supercup =

German Supercup
- Match programme cover
- Event: DFL-Supercup
Borussia Dortmund	Bayern Munich
0	2
- Date: 14 August 2016
- Venue: Signal Iduna Park, Dortmund
- Man of the Match: Manuel Neuer (Bayern Munich)
- Referee: Tobias Welz (Wiesbaden)
- Attendance: 81,360
- Weather: Clear; 19 °C (66 °F); 52% humidity

The 2016 DFL-Supercup was the seventh edition of the German Super Cup under the name DFL-Supercup, an annual football match contested by the winners of the previous season's Bundesliga and DFB-Pokal competitions. The match was played on 14 August 2016 at the Signal Iduna Park in Dortmund.

It featured Bayern Munich, the winners of the 2015–16 Bundesliga (and the 2015–16 DFB-Pokal), who had lost the three previous super cups and last won in 2012, and 2015–16 Bundesliga runners-up Borussia Dortmund, who last won in 2014. Dortmund qualified as league runners-up by virtue of Bayern winning the league and cup double.

Bayern Munich won the DFL-Supercup 2–0 for their fifth title.

== Teams ==
In the following table, matches until 1996 were in the DFB-Supercup era, since 2010 were in the DFL-Supercup era.

Team	Qualification	Previous appearances (bold indicates winners)
Borussia Dortmund	2015–16 Bundesliga runners-up	7 (**1989**, **1995**, **1996**, 2011, 2012, **2013**, **2014**) (Note: Winners of the unofficial 2008 German Supercup. One-time runners-up in the DFL-Ligapokal.)
Bayern Munich	2015–16 Bundesliga champions and 2015–16 DFB-Pokal winners	9 (**1987**, 1989, **1990**, 1994, **2010**, **2012**, 2013, 2014, 2015) (Note: Runners-up in the unofficial 2008 German Supercup. Six-time winners and one-time runners-up in the DFL-Ligapokal.)

== Background ==
It was Dortmund's eighth DFL-Supercup, with a record of five wins and two losses prior. It was Bayern's fifth consecutive and tenth overall DFL-Supercup, with a record of four wins and five losses prior. This was the fifth DFL-Supercup between Dortmund and Bayern, having previously met in 1989, 2012, 2013, and 2014. Of these, Dortmund have won three (in 1989, 2013, and 2014), while Bayern have won once (2012).

This was the first official match for Carlo Ancelotti as head coach of Bayern.

== Match ==
=== Summary ===
Arturo Vidal scored the opening goal for Bayern Munich in the 58th minute with a low right foot finish from six yards out after his initial shot from just outside the penalty box was parried by goalkeeper Roman Bürki back into his path. Thomas Müller got the second in the 79th minute with a close range finish from inside the six yard box after a knock down header from Mats Hummels following a corner.

=== Details ===
14 August 2016
20:30 CEST

Borussia Dortmund	0–2	Bayern Munich
	Report	Vidal 58'; Müller 79'

Signal Iduna Park, Dortmund
Attendance: 81,360
Referee: Tobias Welz (Wiesbaden)

**Borussia Dortmund**	**Bayern Munich**

GK	38	(Switzerland) Roman Bürki
RB	30	(Germany) Felix Passlack	(yellow card) 29'
CB	25	(Greece) Sokratis Papastathopoulos
CB	5	(Spain) Marc Bartra
LB	29	(Germany) Marcel Schmelzer (c)
CM	27	(Germany) Gonzalo Castro
CM	18	(Germany) Sebastian Rode	(yellow card) 61'
RW	20	(Colombia) Adrián Ramos		(substituted off) 69'
AM	23	(Japan) Shinji Kagawa
LW	7	(France) Ousmane Dembélé	(yellow card) 39'	(substituted off) 68'
CF	17	(Gabon) Pierre-Emerick Aubameyang		(substituted off) 78'
Substitutes:
GK	1	(Germany) Roman Weidenfeller
DF	13	(Portugal) Raphaël Guerreiro
DF	26	(Poland) Łukasz Piszczek
MF	9	(Turkey) Emre Mor		(substituted on) 78'
MF	10	(Germany) Mario Götze
MF	21	(Germany) André Schürrle		(substituted on) 68'
MF	33	(Germany) Julian Weigl		(substituted on) 69'
Manager:
(Germany) Thomas Tuchel

GK	1	(Germany) Manuel Neuer
RB	21	(Germany) Philipp Lahm (c)
CB	8	(Spain) Javi Martínez	(yellow card) 10'
CB	5	(Germany) Mats Hummels
LB	27	(Austria) David Alaba
CM	23	(Chile) Arturo Vidal		(substituted off) 71'
CM	14	(Spain) Xabi Alonso	(yellow card) 29'
CM	6	(Spain) Thiago
RW	25	(Germany) Thomas Müller		(substituted off) 86'
LW	7	(France) Franck Ribéry	(yellow card) 29'	(substituted off) 65'
CF	9	(Poland) Robert Lewandowski
Substitutes:
GK	26	(Germany) Sven Ulreich
DF	13	(Brazil) Rafinha
DF	18	(Spain) Juan Bernat		(substituted on) 86'
DF	39	(Germany) Nicolas Feldhahn
MF	29	(France) Kingsley Coman		(substituted on) 65'
MF	32	(Germany) Joshua Kimmich		(substituted on) 71'
FW	37	(United States) Julian Green
Manager:
(Italy) Carlo Ancelotti

Man of the Match:
Manuel Neuer (Bayern Munich)

Assistant referees:
Rafael Foltyn (Mainz-Kastel)
Martin Thomsen (Kleve)
Fourth official:
Tobias Stieler (Hamburg)

**Match rules**

- 90 minutes.
- Penalty shoot-out if scores level.
- Seven named substitutes, of which up to three may be used.

=== Statistics ===
Statistic	Borussia Dortmund	Bayern Munich
Goals scored	0	2
Total shots	20	10
Shots on target	5	5
Saves	3	5
Ball possession	56%	44%
Corner kicks	7	2
Fouls committed	15	18
Offsides	2	0
Yellow cards	3	3
Red cards	0	0

== See also ==
- 2016–17 Bundesliga
- 2016–17 DFB-Pokal
