= Álvaro Martínez (politician) =

Argentine politician

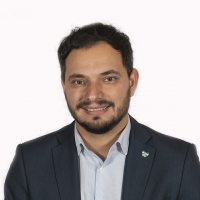

National Deputy
- Incumbent
- Assumed office 10 December 2021
- Constituency: Mendoza

Personal details
- Born: 13 November 1986 (age 39)
- Party: Republican Proposal
- Occupation: Lawyer

Álvaro Martínez (born 13 November 1986) is an Argentine politician who is a member of the Chamber of Deputies of Argentina elected in Mendoza Province. He is the president of the Mendoza chapter of the Republican Proposal (PRO) party.

== Biography ==
He worked as a lawyer before elected in 2021.
