= Karl Hopfner =

German football executive (born 1952)

President of FC Bayern München e.V. and Chairman of the supervisory board of FC Bayern München AG
- In office 2 May 2014 – 25 November 2016
- Preceded by: Uli Hoeneß
- Succeeded by: Uli Hoeneß

Senior Vice President of FC Bayern München e.V. and member of the supervisory board of FC Bayern München AG
- In office 1 February 2013 – 2 May 2014
- Preceded by: Dr. Fritz Scherer
- Succeeded by: Rudolf Schels

Deputy Chairman of the Executive board for FC Bayern München AG
- In office 2002–2013
- Preceded by: —
- Succeeded by: Jan-Christian Dreesen

Managing director of the Sport-Werbe GmbH
- In office 1995–2002

Managing director of the FC Bayern München e.V.
- In office 1983–1995

Personal details
- Born: 28 August 1952 (age 74)

Karl Hopfner (born 28 August 1952) is a German football executive who has worked for Bayern Munich. In addition to his role at Bayern Munich, he is on UEFA's committee for club tournaments, a member of the board of the Deutsche Fußball Liga and the German Football Association. He is known for turning around the club's finances when the club had massive debts when he was first hired in 1983. Hopfner was elected President of the FC Bayern München eV.

== Career ==
Hopfner applied for Managing Director of the FC Bayern München eV in 1982 after seeing a "local" job ad. He eventually got the job and started the position in 1983. He eventually became managing director of FC Bayern München Sport-Werbe GmbH and eventually, from 2002, a member of the vorstand of FC Bayern München AG. He was in–charge of finance as part of his role on the vorstand. He was set to leave the club at the end of 2012 for health reasons. However, at the club's annual general meeting on 15 November 2012, Hopfner was elected as Senior Vice President of FC Bayern München eV. Bayern announced on 26 September 2012 that Jan-Christian Dreesen would replace Hopfner on the vorstand. Dreesen took over on 1 February 2013. Following the resignation of Uli Hoeneß, Hopfner was announced as the candidate to become the new President of FC Bayern München e.V. The election was held on 2 May 2014 at the extraordinary general meeting. The result was that he would succeed Hoeneß as the new club president. During his career at Bayern, Hopfner was a member of the board of the Deutsche Fußball Liga and the German Football Association and also sits on the club commission for UEFA.
