= Toni Kroos =

German footballer (born 1990)

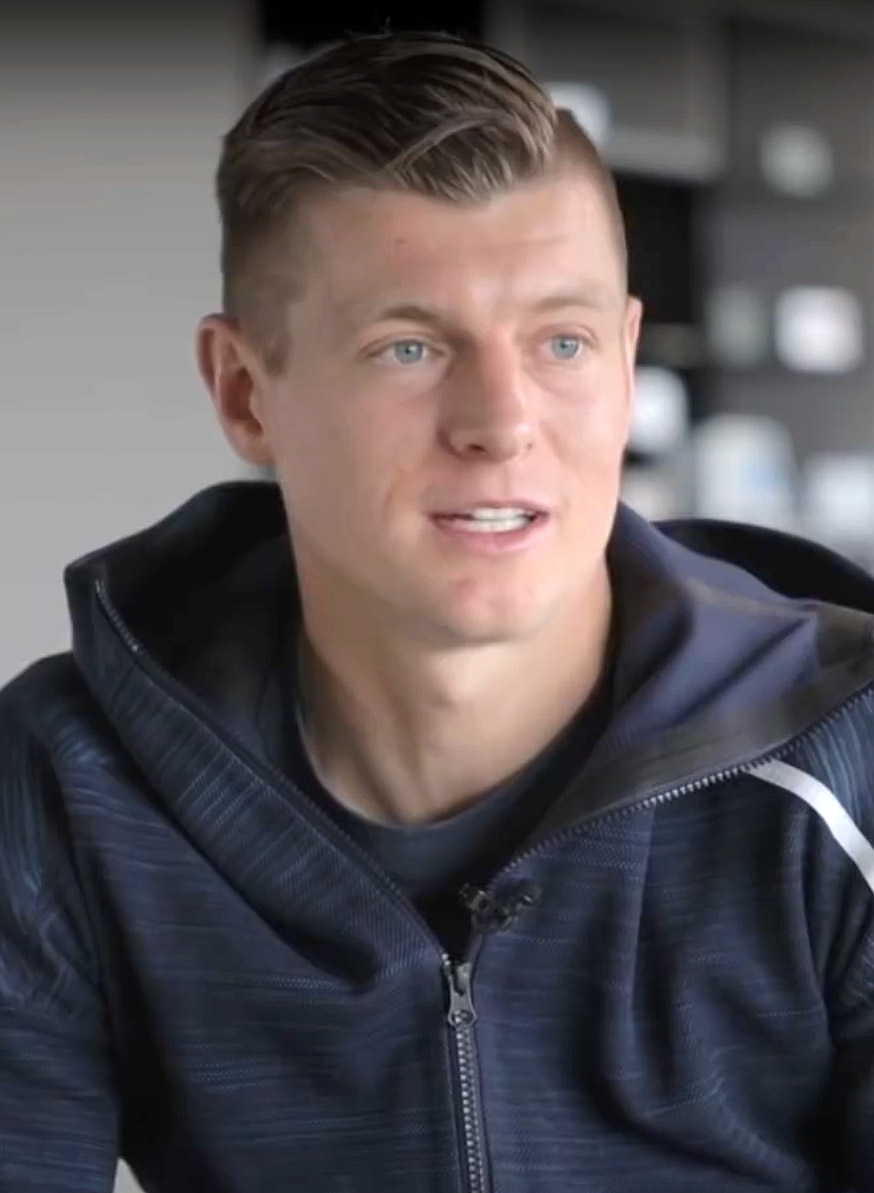
- Kroos in 2021

Personal information
- Full name: Toni Kroos
- Date of birth: 4 January 1990 (age 36)
- Place of birth: Greifswald, East Germany
- Height: 1.83 m (6 ft 0 in)
- Position: Midfielder

Youth career
- 1997–2002: Greifswalder SC
- 2002–2006: Hansa Rostock
- 2006–2007: Bayern Munich

Senior career*
Years	Team	Apps	(Gls)
2007–2008	Bayern Munich II	13	(4)
2007–2014	Bayern Munich	130	(13)
2009–2010	→ Bayer Leverkusen (loan)	43	(10)
2014–2024	Real Madrid	306	(22)
Total		492	(49)

International career
2005–2007	Germany U17	34	(17)
2009	Germany U19	5	(3)
2008–2009	Germany U21	10	(2)
2010–2024	Germany	114	(17)
Medal record
Men's football
Representing Germany
FIFA World Cup
Winner	2014 Brazil	Team
Third place	2010 South Africa	Team
UEFA European Championship
Third place	2012 Poland–Ukraine	Team
FIFA U-17 World Cup
Third place	2007 South Korea	Team
- * Club domestic league appearances and goals

Toni Kroos (German pronunciation: [ˈtoːni kʁoːs]; born 4 January 1990) is a German former professional footballer who played as a midfielder. Regarded as one of the greatest midfielders of all time, he was known for his vision and pinpoint precision passing. (Note: Attributed to multiple references:) Kroos played mainly as a central midfielder and occasionally as a defensive midfielder. Having won 34 trophies over his 17 year career, he is the third most decorated German footballer after Thomas Müller (35 trophies) and Manuel Neuer (36).

Kroos began his senior club career at Bayern Munich, where he debuted at age 17 in 2007. He was used sparingly for Bayern and he went on loan to fellow Bundesliga side Bayer Leverkusen for 18 months, where he became a key contributor. He returned to his parent club in 2010. With Bayern, Kroos won three Bundesliga titles (including two consecutive titles), a UEFA Champions League, two DFB-Pokal trophies, and was named in the Bundesliga Team of the Season three times. In 2014, he joined Real Madrid for a €25 million transfer.

In Madrid, Kroos won twenty-two trophies, including four La Liga titles and five UEFA Champions League trophies, three of which he won consecutively from 2016 to 2018. He was named in the Champions League team of the season each time. He was named in the FIFA FIFPRO World 11 four times, UEFA Team of the Year three times, and the La Liga Team of the Season twice. He was named the IFFHS World's Best Playmaker in 2014 and German Footballer of the Year in 2018 and 2024.

Kroos won the Golden Player award at the 2006 UEFA European Under-17 Championship and the Golden Ball at the 2007 FIFA U-17 World Cup. He made his senior debut for Germany in 2010, at age 20, and appeared in seven major tournaments. With 114 international matches for Germany, Kroos is one of the top ten most capped German players. Kroos helped Germany win the 2014 FIFA World Cup, where he was top assister and named in the All-Star Team and Dream Team. At UEFA Euro 2016, he was named in the Team of the Tournament. In 2024, Kroos retired from professional football.

== Early life ==
Kroos was born in Greifswald, Mecklenburg-Vorpommern, East Germany, on 4 January 1990. He was born in the last year of East Germany's existence, several weeks after the fall of the Berlin Wall and nine months before German reunification. His mother Britta was an East German national badminton champion and his father Roland was also a footballer and at that time, he managed Hansa Rostock's youth team. He has a younger brother, Felix Kroos, who was also a professional footballer. During his youth, he was a mediocre student and spent a lot of time practicing football, however, he was well-behaved in class and well-liked among his peers at school.

== Club career ==
=== Early career ===
Kroos first played for local club Greifswalder SC, later transferring to the youth team of Hansa Rostock. Kroos moved to Bayern Munich's youth setup in 2006. Kroos was missing up to 40 days during the school year due to training.

For the 2007–08 season, at the age of 17, Kroos was promoted to Bayern's senior team. He made an astounding start to his Bundesliga career, making his debut for Bayern on 26 September 2007 in a 5–0 win against Energie Cottbus and twice assisting Miroslav Klose goals within 18 minutes of his appearance as a substitute. At the time of his debut, Kroos was the youngest player ever to represent Bayern in a professional match at 17 years, 265 days old, a record since broken by David Alaba in 2010. On 25 October, Kroos earned Bayern a valuable victory away to Red Star Belgrade on his UEFA Cup debut, coming on as a substitute in the 81st minute and providing an assist for Miroslav Klose and then scoring the winning goal, his first for the club, in stoppage time. He made his first start for the club in a 3–1 defeat away at VfB Stuttgart. Kroos ended his first season with 20 appearances for Bayern, including six starts. He also scored three goals in 12 appearances for Bayern Munich II in the Regionalliga Süd.

Despite being selected to start in Bayern's opening 2008–09 Bundesliga match against Hamburger SV, Kroos appeared less frequently for die Roten during the first half of the 2008–09 season. On 5 November 2008, however, he made his UEFA Champions League debut as a 79th-minute substitute against Fiorentina in matchday four of the group stage.

==== Loan at Bayer Leverkusen ====
On 31 January 2009, Bayern allowed Kroos to join Bayer Leverkusen on an 18-month loan to gain first team experience. He made his debut on 28 February as a substitute in a 1–0 defeat against Hannover 96. On 12 April, he made his first Bundesliga start for Leverkusen, assisting the team's goal in a 1–1 draw with Werder Bremen. On 18 April 2009, he scored his first Bundesliga goal in a 2–1 loss to VfL Wolfsburg. On 30 May, Kroos appeared as a late substitute in the 2009 DFB-Pokal Final against Werder Bremen, where Leverkusen were beaten 1–0 by a Mesut Özil goal. During the 2008–09 season, Kroos made 13 appearances for Leverkusen in all competitions, scoring once. Kroos established himself as a regular in the Leverkusen team in 2009–10, appearing all but one of Bayer's Bundesliga matches. Between matchdays 16 and 20, Kroos registered five goals and four assists in five Bundesliga matches, earning him back-to-back "player of the month" awards from kicker for December 2009 and January 2010. He ended the season with nine goals and 12 assists from 33 matches.

=== Bayern Munich ===
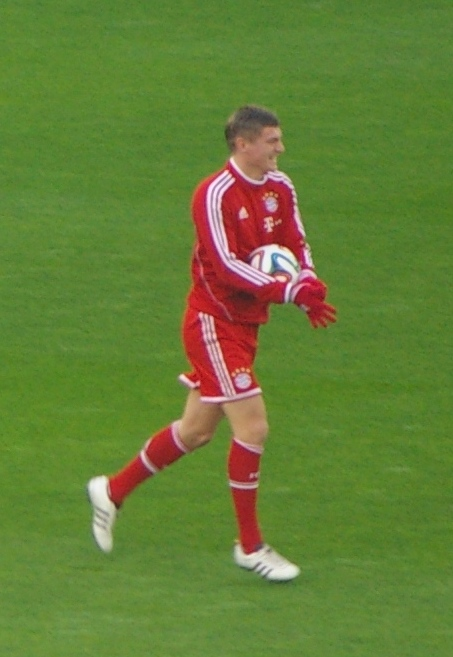
Kroos with Bayern Munich in 2014

In the summer of 2010, on the expiration of his loan at Bayer Leverkusen, Kroos returned to Bayern Munich. When asked about his first team chances with Bayern, runner-up in the previous season's Champions League, Kroos stated, "I want to play as often as possible!" On 16 August 2010, he started against Germania Windeck in the first round of the DFB-Pokal, scoring the third goal in a 4–0 victory. On 29 October 2010, he scored his first league goal for the club, in a 4–1 win for the Bavarians against SC Freiburg. During the 2010–11 season, Kroos was a regular starter for Bayern in the Bundesliga, DFB-Pokal and Champions League. He ended the season with 37 appearances in all competitions.

During 2011–12, under Jupp Heynckes, his former coach at Leverkusen, Kroos established himself as a first choice player from Bayern, forming a strong midfield partnership with national team colleague Bastian Schweinsteiger. He played 51 matches in all competitions during the season, including the 2012 UEFA Champions League Final, where Bayern were beaten on penalties by Chelsea at the Allianz Arena.

Kroos was an important member of Bayern's treble-winning team during the 2012–13 season. As the most advanced member of a midfield containing Schweinsteiger and Javi Martínez, Kroos scored three goals in the team's opening four Bundesliga matches. He also scored his first Champions League goal in Bayern's opening group match against Valencia. After sustaining an injury in the first leg of the Champions League quarter-final against Juventus, Kroos was unavailable for the remainder of the season, missing Bayern's successes in the 2013 UEFA Champions League Final, the 2013 DFB-Pokal Final and the last seven matches of the Bundesliga season.

Kroos returned to fitness for the start of the 2013–14 season and, played in the German Super Cup and the UEFA Super Cup. On 4 October 2013, he scored his first goal of the season in a 1–1 draw against former club Bayer Leverkusen in the Bundesliga. He started two matches for Bayern in the 2013 FIFA Club World Cup, the first against Guangzhou Evergrande in the 3–0 semi-final win on 17 December 2013, and in the final as the team beat Raja Casablanca 2–0. On 19 February 2014, Kroos scored his second goal of the season in a 2–0 Champions League win against Arsenal. On 25 March, he scored in a 3–1 win over Hertha BSC as Bayern were confirmed as Bundesliga champions.

=== Real Madrid ===
==== 2014–15: Debut season ====
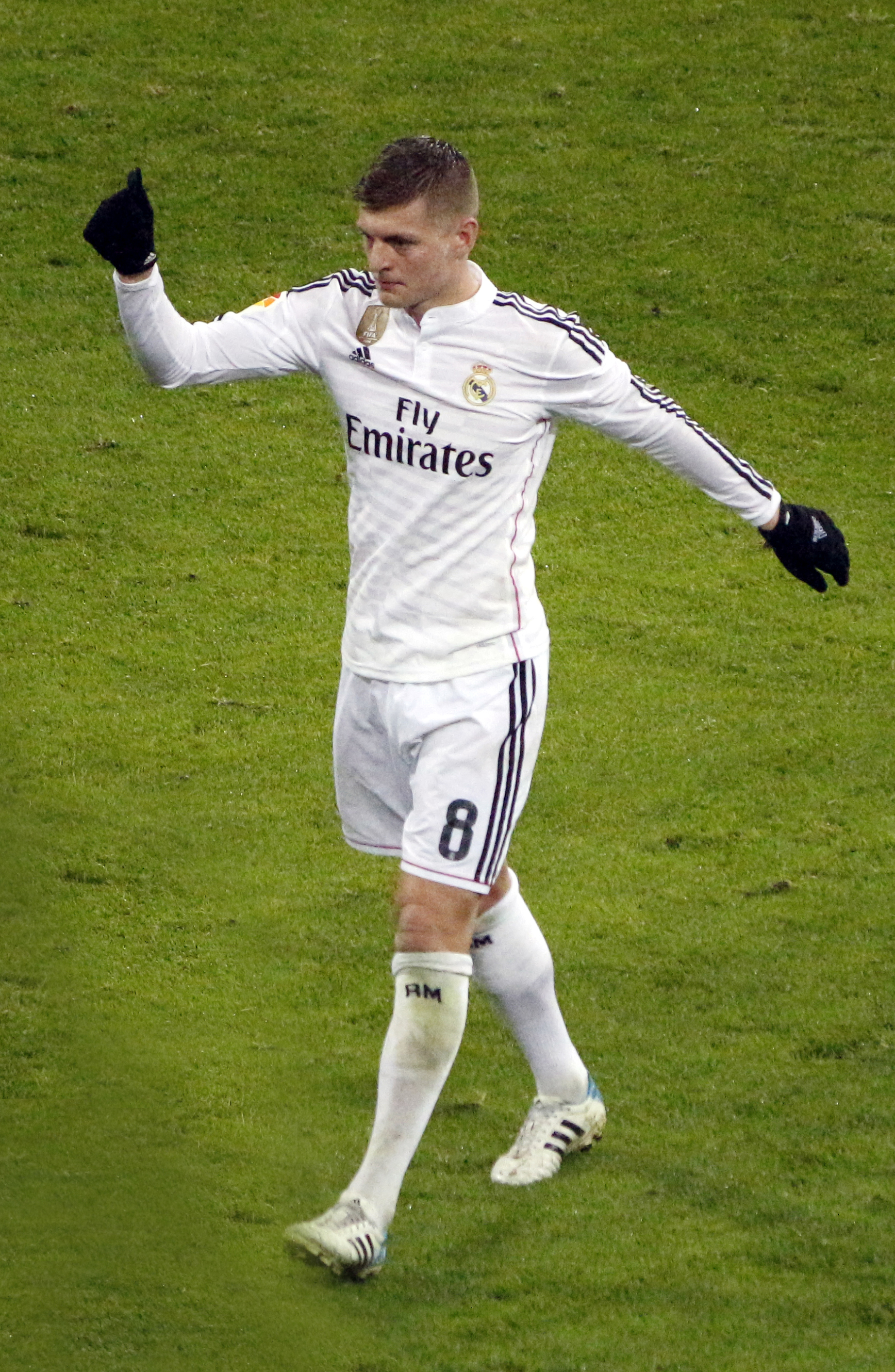
Kroos playing for Real Madrid in 2015

Prior to joining Real Madrid, Kroos had a deal in place to join Manchester United after agreeing terms with David Moyes. However, after Moyes was sacked and Louis van Gaal replaced him, the Dutch manager decided against signing Kroos. Around the time of the 2014 World Cup, he received a call from Carlo Ancelotti. On 17 July 2014, Spanish La Liga club Real Madrid announced that they had reached an agreement for the transfer of Kroos, signing a six-year deal for an undisclosed fee. The press reported that Kroos had cost between €24 and €30 million. Greifswalder SV 04, the successor to his first youth team, received €60000 from the transfer.

Kroos became the ninth German player, after Günter Netzer, Paul Breitner, Uli Stielike, Bernd Schuster, Bodo Illgner, Christoph Metzelder, Mesut Özil, and Sami Khedira, to join Real Madrid. At his presentation in front of 8000 supporters, he stated how Real Madrid is the "biggest club in the world" and is a "cut above Bayern". He played in his debut match against Sevilla in the 2014 UEFA Super Cup on 12 August 2014, winning his first trophy at Real Madrid.

Kroos was part of a midfield trio with James Rodríguez and Luka Modrić that led Real Madrid to 22-game winning run late in the year. On 8 November, Kroos scored his first goal for Real Madrid in a 5–1 win over Rayo Vallecano, at home. In December, he helped the team win the 2014 FIFA Club World Cup, leading the tournament in assists. He was named to the FIFA FIFPRO World 11 and the UEFA Team of the Year.

==== 2015–19: Sustained domestic success and European dominance ====
In 2015, Ancelotti was replaced by Rafa Benítez in Madrid's command. Benítez was replaced in the middle of the season by Zinedine Zidane, under whom Kroos continued to be a key midfield player. Zidane said "We signed Toni because we want him to mark an era" and called Kroos "perfect for Madrid". He was a regular starter when the team won the 2015–16 Champions League, his second Champions League trophy. Los Blancos' triumph at San Siro meant that Kroos became the first-ever German to lift the Champions League trophy with two clubs.

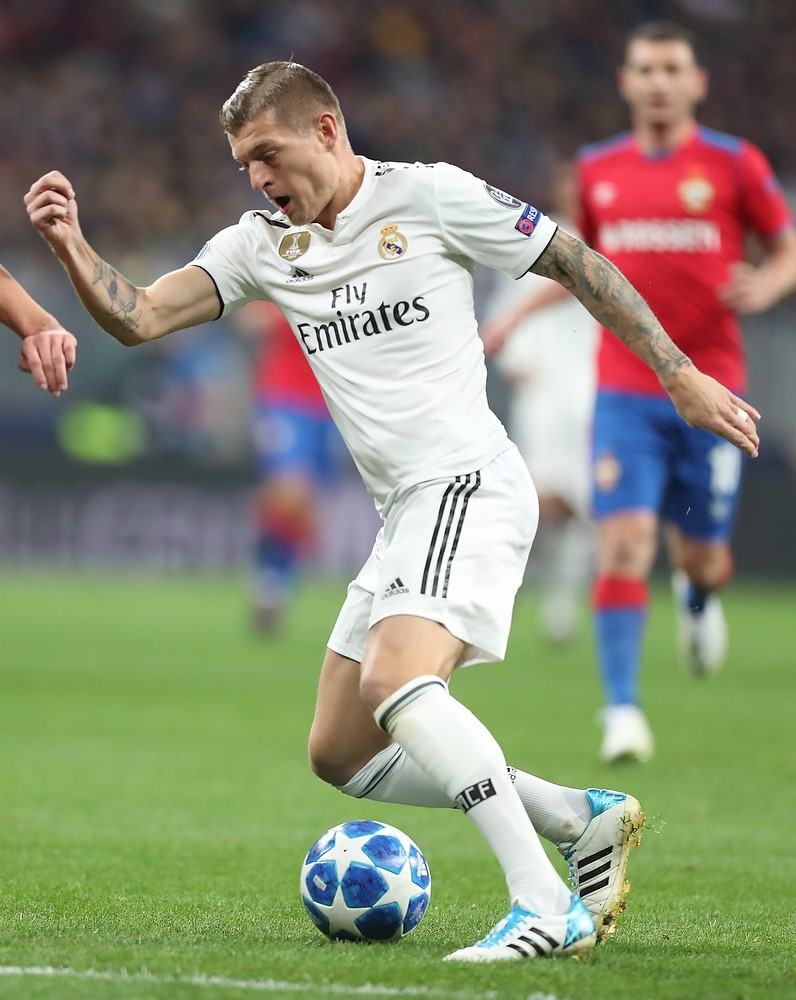
Kroos playing for Real Madrid in 2018

In 2016, Kroos became a part of a collaboration between the German Football Association and The LEGO Group, who in May released a Europe-exclusive collectible minifigure series, with Kroos featured as the tenth of sixteen minifigures in the collection. On 12 October 2016, he signed a new contract until 2022, and by the end of the year he was once again nominated to the FIFA FIFPRO World 11 and the UEFA Team of the Year. He scored the winning goal for Real Madrid in the 81st minute of the game against Celta Vigo as Real Madrid won their first home game of the La Liga season by 2–1. He was a regular starter when Madrid won the 2016–17 La Liga and later defended their title in the 2016–17 Champions League. He became the first German player to win the trophy three times. At the end of 2016–17, Kroos was the most used player under Zidane. During the 2017–18 Champions League, he made twelve appearances, when Madrid won their third consecutive and 13th overall Champions League title.

==== 2019–2021: Fifth FIFA Club World Cup title ====
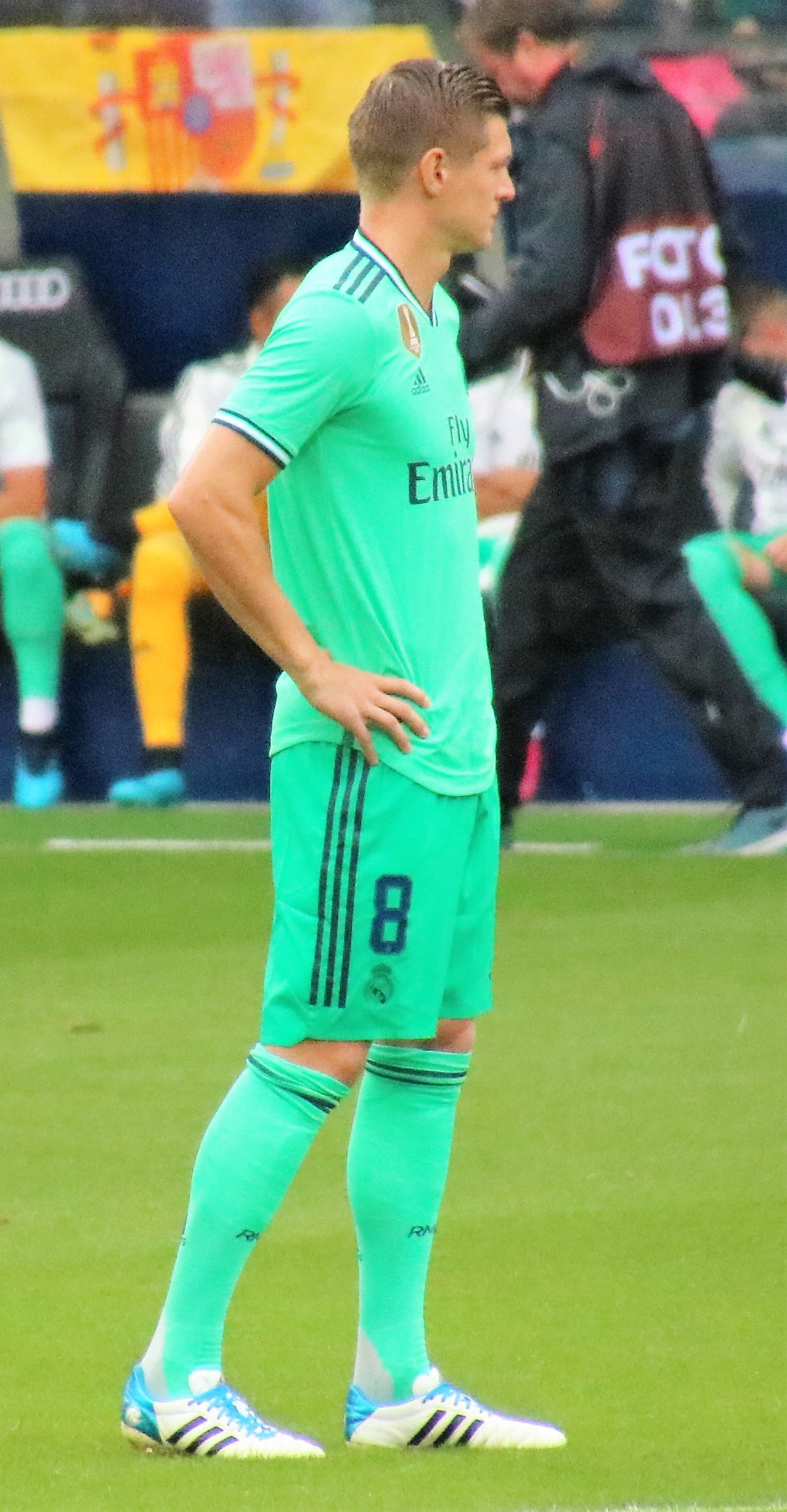
Kroos playing for Real Madrid in 2019

On 22 December 2018, Kroos won his record fifth FIFA Club World Cup after his team defeated Al Ain FC with a 4–1 margin in the final. On 20 May 2019, he extended his contract with the club until 2023. On 17 August 2019, Kroos opened his goal account for the campaign in the La Liga season opener against Celta Vigo at Balaídos in a 3–1 win with a long range effort. On 22 October 2019, he scored the winning goal in a 1–0 victory over Galatasaray in his 100th appearance in the Champions League.

On 8 January 2020, Kroos scored his first Supercopa goal directly from a corner kick against Valencia in the 2019–20 Supercopa de España semi-final in Jeddah as Los Blancos won 3–1. Three days later, Real Madrid won the Supercopa after beating the local rivals Atlético Madrid on penalties. On 16 February, Kroos again scored against Celta Vigo, this time at the Bernabeu in a 2–2 league draw. This was his sixth goal against the Galician club, meaning he had scored against them more than any other team in his career.

On 16 June, when La Liga restarted after a three-month hiatus due to the COVID-19 pandemic, Kroos scored Real Madrid's first official goal at the Alfredo Di Stéfano Stadium in just four minutes in an eventual 3–1 win over Eibar. One month later, Real Madrid went on a ten-game winning run and won the 2019–20 La Liga title with Kroos featuring in all 11 matches post-lockdown. On 8 August, Kroos' season came to an end as Manchester City eliminated Madrid in the Champions League Round of 16 (4–2 on aggregate).

==== 2021–2024: Further honours and retirement ====
On 10 April 2021, Kroos scored his first El Clásico goal against Barcelona which came from a free-kick in the 28th minute at the Di Stefano Stadium which proved to be the winner in a vital 2–1 league win to send Los Blancos to the top of the league. This was Kroos' first free kick goal for Real Madrid in just his sixth attempt. In the 2021–22 UEFA Champions League, Kroos won his fifth title in the competition, scoring two goals in twelve appearances.

On 10 August 2022, Kroos started the 2022–23 season by winning his fourth UEFA Super Cup against Eintracht Frankfurt. This match would prove to be significant because it was the last time the famous trio commonly known by fans as KCM (Kroos, Casemiro and Modrić) would start a match together. Casemiro would move on to Manchester United a week later. On the first matchday of the 2022–23 UEFA Champions League season, Kroos received the UEFA Man of the Match for his performance against Celtic at Celtic Park. On 11 September 2022, Kroos captained Real Madrid for the first time in a 4–1 home win against Mallorca after club captain Karim Benzema had been injured and the reserve captains (Nacho and Modrić) started on the bench. On 16 October, he played his 250th La Liga match in a 3–1 El Clásico win over Barcelona. On 30 October, Kroos received the first red card of his professional career in a 1–1 home draw against Girona after he received a second yellow card for a foul on Aleix García.

On 11 February 2023, Kroos broke his own record by gaining his sixth FIFA Club World Cup title, one with Bayern Munich and five with Real Madrid. On 6 May, he played in the 2–1 win over Osasuna in the Copa del Rey final, to achieve his first ever trophy in that tournament. On 21 June 2023, Kroos extended his contract with Real Madrid for one more year, keeping him until June 2024. On 3 October, Kroos got his 100th Champions League appearance for the club, starting in Madrid's 3–2 turnaround away win over Napoli.

On 21 May 2024, Kroos announced that he would retire from club and international football after UEFA Euro 2024. In his last La Liga fixture at the Santiago Bernabéu on 25 May, he played in a goalless draw against Real Betis, where he received a guard of honour and a standing ovation from the entire stadium when he was substituted in the 86th minute. On 1 June, he played his last match for the club, where he provided an assist from a corner to Dani Carvajal's first goal in a 2–0 win over Borussia Dortmund in the Champions League final, getting his 300th win for Real Madrid. Moreover, this match saw Kroos equal Paco Gento's record of six European Cup titles alongside Dani Carvajal, Luka Modrić and Nacho. In total he made 479 top-flight league matches for Bayern, Leverkusen and Madrid.

== International career ==
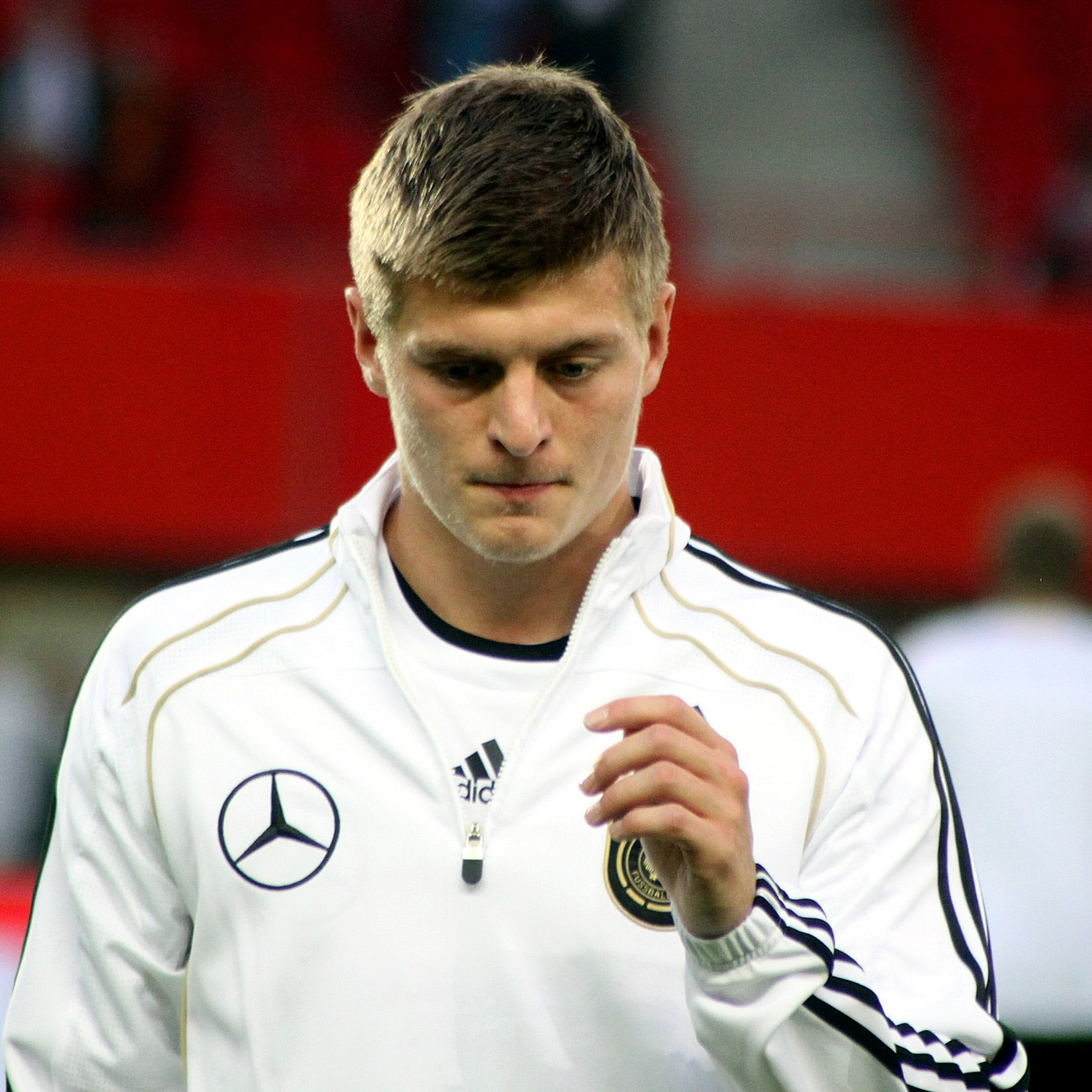
Kroos with Germany in 2011

=== Youth teams ===
In the 2007 FIFA U-17 World Cup, Toni Kroos was awarded the Golden Ball as the tournament's best player and also won the Bronze Shoe after scoring five goals. Kroos' debut for the national U-21 team came on 5 September 2008 in a 2009 Euro U-21 Championship Qualifier against Northern Ireland and scored the opening goal in the 11th minute, his second goal for the U-21 side was goal in Germany's 1–0 win over Italy, a precise long-range shot in the angle. It came as a surprise that coach Horst Hrubesch left him out of Germany's U-21 squad for Euro 2009, and Germany went on to win the tournament without him.

=== 2010 World Cup ===
In January 2010, Kroos was called up to the senior Germany team for the first time, for a training session in Sindelfingen and was named in the squad for the following match, a friendly against Argentina on 3 March 2010, in which he subsequently made his debut for the national side.

Kroos was selected to Joachim Löw's 23-man squad for the 2010 FIFA World Cup in South Africa. He made his FIFA World Cup debut in Germany's final group-stage match versus Ghana, coming on in the 80th minute for Bastian Schweinsteiger, with Germany leading 1–0. He made further appearances as a substitute in the quarter-finals against Argentina, in the semi-finals against Spain and in the third place play-off against Uruguay.

=== Euro 2012 ===
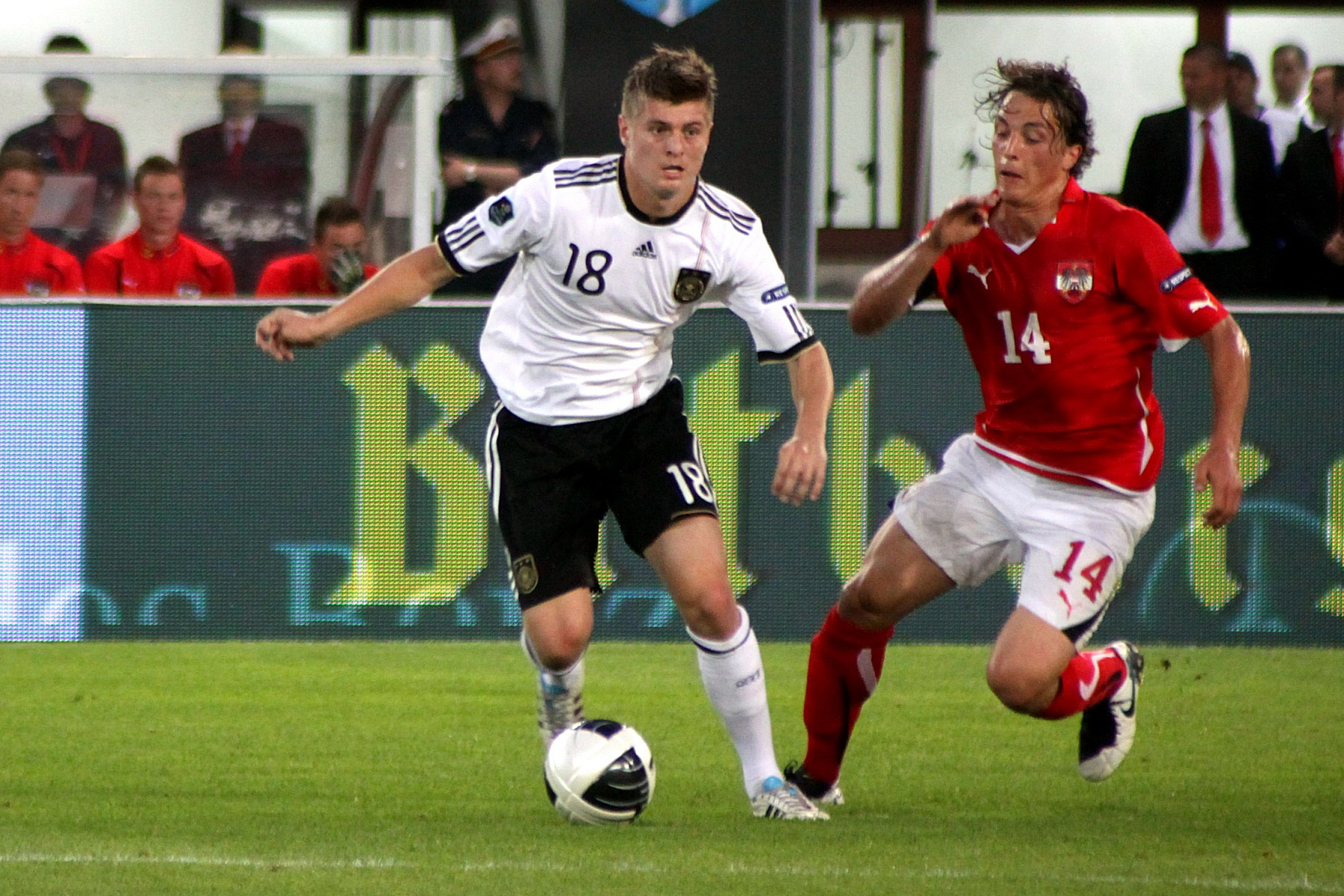
Kroos (left) battles Julian Baumgartlinger for the ball in a Euro 2012 qualifying match against Austria in 2011

Kroos established himself as a regular starter in Germany's qualification campaign for UEFA Euro 2012, playing in eight out of a possible ten games. Germany won all ten qualifying matches to top group A. After qualification was already ensured, Kroos scored his first two international goals, both with his strong right foot. Notably, both Kroos' goals were Germany's first after falling behind in the respective matches, both of which were drawn away friendlies, against the two Euro 2012 hosts – Poland and Ukraine. National coach Joachim Löw also praised him: "How Toni distributes the ball, how he receives it, is very good. He's technically excellent ... He has made progress in the last few matches, I'm extremely satisfied with the player." At the tournament finals, Kroos appeared as a substitute in all three of Germany's Group B matches. For the semi-final match against Italy, Löw selected the naturally attacking Kroos to man mark Italy's playmaker Andrea Pirlo. The decision was heavily criticised as Germany lost the match 2–1.

=== 2014 World Cup ===
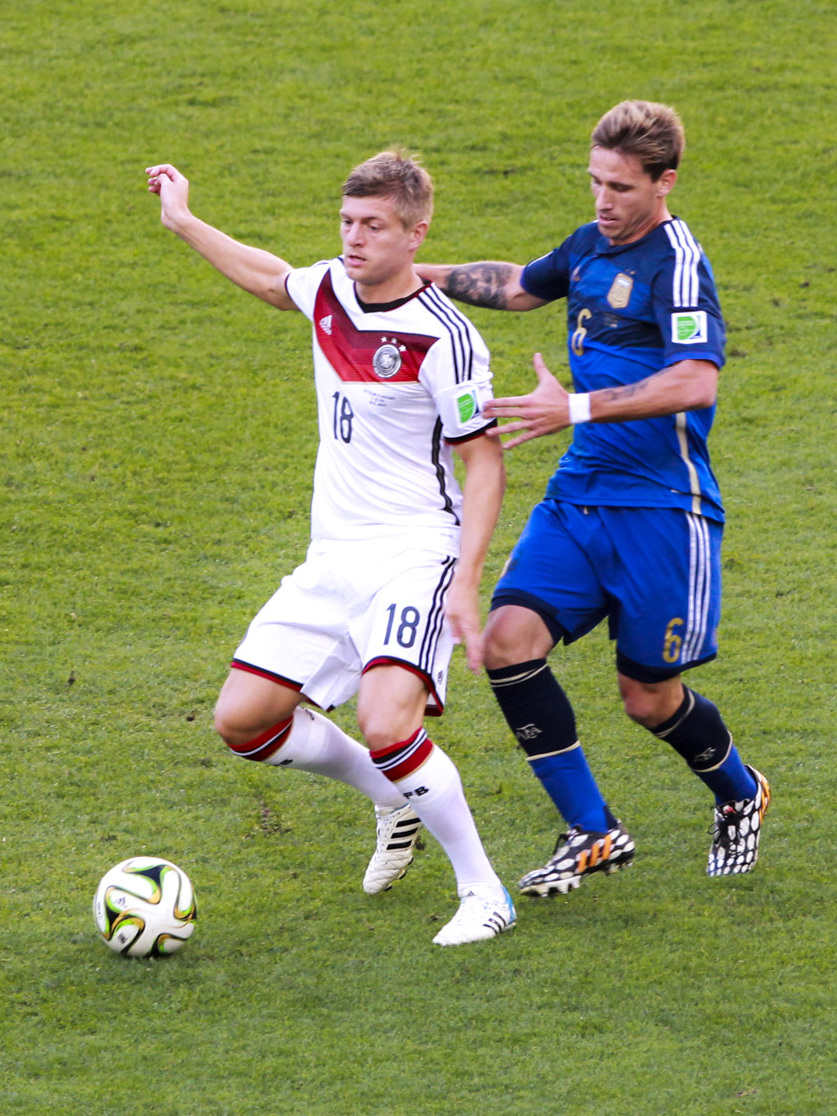
Kroos (left) playing in the 2014 World Cup final

During Germany's 2014 World Cup qualifying campaign, Kroos scored his first two competitive international goals in a 6–1 win over the Republic of Ireland in Dublin. On 6 September 2013, he scored the team's second goal in a 3–0 win over Austria.

Kroos was named in Germany's squad for the 2014 World Cup. In the team's opening match, a 4–0 win over Portugal, Kroos started in midfield and assisted Mats Hummels for Germany's second goal, in addition to helping create Thomas Müller's second goal for Germany's third of the match. Then in the quarter final the only goal scored by Mats Hummels against France came from his free kick. In the semi-final against the host nation Brazil, Kroos scored two goals two minutes apart (24' and 26') in Germany's 7–1 win. He also recorded his fourth assist of the tournament, crossing for Thomas Müller's opening goal, and was named man of the match by FIFA. Kroos has been nicknamed Garçom ("waiter" in Portuguese) by the Brazilians for precisely delivering most passes to the strikers.

On 11 July, Kroos was named on the ten-man shortlist for FIFA's Golden Ball award for the tournament's best player. The Castrol Performance Index, the official statistical analyser of the World Cup, rated Kroos as the best player at the 2014 World Cup, with a rating of 9.79 out of 10. Kroos is considered the only player from the former East Germany to ever win the World Cup.

=== 2018 World Cup ===
On 4 June 2018, Kroos was included in Germany's final 23-man squad for the 2018 FIFA World Cup. On 23 June, Kroos scored from a free-kick in stoppage time against Sweden to resurrect Germany's World Cup hopes with a 2–1 victory. But in their next and last group stage match, his side were knocked out by South Korea after losing 2–0 four days later.

=== 2020–21 UEFA Nations League ===
On 13 October 2020, Kroos played his 100th match for Germany in a 3–3 draw against Switzerland in the 2020–21 UEFA Nations League A.

=== Euro 2020 and initial retirement from international play ===
On 19 May 2021, he was selected to the squad for the UEFA Euro 2020.

Three days after the team lost 2–0 against England in the Round of 16 on 29 June, Kroos announced his retirement from international football, after being heavily criticised for his poor performance. Honorary Bayern Munich president Uli Hoeneß stated that Kroos' style of play which emphasizes horizontal passing doesn't fit the modern game. Former German international and Ballon d'Or winner Lothar Matthäus expressed similar sentiments, stating that he does not agree with Kroos style of play and that "Kroos is no longer international class". However, per Kroos own statement he said the reasons for his retirement were to focus on his club career and family.

=== Return to the national team, UEFA Euro 2024, and retirement ===
On 22 February 2024, Kroos announced that he would return to the German national team for the tournament on home soil, having been approached to do so by new manager Julian Nagelsmann. In March 2024, he was called up for the next window. Kroos assisted a goal seven seconds into his international return against France on 23 March 2024. Kroos was included in the final Germany squad for UEFA Euro 2024, which he announced in May would be his final tournament as a professional footballer. He went on to help the hosts reach the quarter-finals, where they lost against eventual champions Spain 2–1 after extra time; this would be his last career match.

== Style of play ==
"How Toni distributes the ball, how he receives it, is very good. He's technically excellent ... He has made progress in the last few matches, I'm extremely satisfied with the player."

— Joachim Löw, former manager of the Germany national team

A tall and athletic right-footed midfielder, Kroos is regarded as one of the best midfielders of his generation and of all time. He is known for the long range and high accuracy of his passing and his ability to create goals with his passing and crossing from set-pieces. He has been described by Jonathan Wilson as "perhaps the archetype of the modern attacking midfielder". Wilson also described Kroos as "dynamic and hardworking", and praised him for his physical strength and versatility across several midfield positions. Kroos played in the centre as a deep-lying playmaker or even as a defensive midfielder due to his ability to both break up play, retain possession, and create chances for teammates. At the beginning of his career, he played as an advanced midfielder, before being shifted to a deep-lying playmaker as his career progressed.

One of his signature moves on the ball involved him taking a run-on first touch past an opponent when receiving a pass under pressure, which allowed him to beat opponents and create space for himself, despite his lack of pace; this move was dubbed the "Kroos shuffle" in the media. Kroos had a wide variety of passes, and he was able to control the midfield with accurate short passes or start attacks with longer passes. Former Manchester United midfielder Paul Scholes said in 2014 that Kroos, "a top-class central midfielder", was the player that United most needed to sign. Reaffirming his high regard for Kroos years later, Scholes selected him as the best German player ever in a 2025 feature with TNT Sports. Former Netherlands captain Johan Cruyff said of Kroos' performances at the 2014 World Cup, "He's doing everything right: the pace in his passes is great and he sees everything. It's nearly perfect."

== Personal life ==
Kroos married his long-term girlfriend Jessica Farber on 13 June 2015. They have two sons and a daughter. He owns a house on the island of Mallorca. In March 2021, Kroos said it was "wrong" for the 2022 FIFA World Cup to be held in Qatar, pointing out the Gulf state's poor treatment of migrant workers and its criminalisation of homosexuality. He said that footballers should draw attention to those issues instead of boycotting the tournament. In 2023, he criticised footballers for moving to the Saudi Pro League, believing that it was driven only by money. He said that he would never move to the country due to its human rights record, which prompted him to be booed while playing in the 2024 Supercopa de España, which was hosted in Saudi Arabia.

Kroos called for Germans to vote in the 2021 German federal election, unless they were voting for the Alternative for Germany, adding "nobody needs them". In July 2024, Kroos said on the ZDF Lanz & Precht podcast that Germany was not the same country that he had left ten years earlier, and he said that his daughter would be safer in Spain. Later in the discussion, he said that he supported immigration to Germany "1000%" but felt that it had been "uncontrolled" and had allowed some "not good" people to enter. Kroos's interview was misinterpreted and many thought he was suggesting a link between immigration and crime in Germany.

== Career statistics ==
=== Club ===
Appearances and goals by club, season and competition
Club	Season	League			National cup (Note: Includes DFB-Pokal, Copa del Rey)		Europe (Note: All appearances in UEFA Champions League, unless otherwise noted)		Other		Total	
Club	Season	Division	Apps	Goals	Apps	Goals	Apps	Goals	Apps	Goals	Apps	Goals
Bayern Munich II	2007–08	Regionalliga Süd	12	3	—		—		—		12	3
Bayern Munich II	2008–09	3. Liga	1	1	—		—		—		1	1
Bayern Munich II	Total		13	4	—		—		—		13	4
Bayern Munich	2007–08	Bundesliga	12	0	2	0	6 (Note: Appearances in UEFA Cup)	1	—		20	1
Bayern Munich	2008–09	Bundesliga	7	0	1	1	1	0	—		9	1
Bayern Munich	2010–11	Bundesliga	27	1	3	1	7	1	—		37	3
Bayern Munich	2011–12	Bundesliga	31	4	6	1	14	2	—		51	7
Bayern Munich	2012–13	Bundesliga	24	6	3	0	9	3	1 (Note: Appearance in DFL-Supercup)	0	37	9
Bayern Munich	2013–14	Bundesliga	29	2	6	1	12	1	4 (Note: One appearance in DFL-Supercup, one appearance in UEFA Super Cup, two appearances in FIFA Club World Cup)	0	51	4
Bayern Munich	Total		130	13	21	4	49	8	5	0	205	25
Bayer Leverkusen (loan)	2008–09	Bundesliga	10	1	3	0	—		—		13	1
Bayer Leverkusen (loan)	2009–10	Bundesliga	33	9	2	0	—		—		35	9
Bayer Leverkusen (loan)	Total		43	10	5	0	—		—		48	10
Real Madrid	2014–15	La Liga	36	2	2	0	12	0	5 (Note: Two appearances in Supercopa de España, one appearance in UEFA Super Cup, two appearances in FIFA Club World Cup)	0	55	2
Real Madrid	2015–16	La Liga	32	1	0	0	12	0	—		44	1
Real Madrid	2016–17	La Liga	29	3	5	0	12	1	2 (Note: Appearances in FIFA Club World Cup)	0	48	4
Real Madrid	2017–18	La Liga	27	5	0	0	12	0	4 (Note: Two appearances in Supercopa de España, one appearance in UEFA Super Cup, one appearance in FIFA Club World Cup)	0	43	5
Real Madrid	2018–19	La Liga	28	0	4	0	8	1	3 (Note: One appearance in UEFA Super Cup, two appearances in FIFA Club World Cup)	0	43	1
Real Madrid	2019–20	La Liga	35	4	2	0	6	1	2 (Note: Appearance(s) in Supercopa de España)	1	45	6
Real Madrid	2020–21	La Liga	28	3	1	0	12	0	1	0	42	3
Real Madrid	2021–22	La Liga	28	1	3	0	12	2	2	0	45	3
Real Madrid	2022–23	La Liga	30	2	5	0	12	0	5 (Note: Two appearances in Supercopa de España, one appearance in UEFA Super Cup, two appearances in FIFA Club World Cup)	0	52	2
Real Madrid	2023–24	La Liga	33	1	1	0	12	0	2	0	48	1
Real Madrid	Total		306	22	23	0	110	5	26	1	465	28
Career total			492	49	49	4	159	13	31	1	731	67

=== International ===
Appearances and goals by national team and year
National team	Year	Apps	Goals
Germany
Germany	2010	13	0
Germany	2011	11	2
Germany	2012	10	2
Germany	2013	7	1
Germany	2014	16	4
Germany	2015	5	0
Germany	2016	12	3
Germany	2017	6	0
Germany	2018	11	2
Germany	2019	5	3
Germany	2020	5	0
Germany	2021	5	0
Germany	2022	0	0
Germany	2023	0	0
Germany	2024	8	0
Total		114	17

Germany score listed first, score column indicates score after each Kroos goal

List of international goals scored by Toni Kroos
No.	Date	Venue	Opponent	Score	Result	Competition
1	6 September 2011	Stadion Gdańsk, Gdańsk, Poland	Poland	1–1	2–2	Friendly
2	11 November 2011	Olimpiyskiy National Sports Complex, Kyiv, Ukraine	Ukraine	1–2	3–3	Friendly
3	12 October 2012	Aviva Stadium, Dublin, Ireland	Republic of Ireland	5–0	6–1	2014 FIFA World Cup qualification
4	12 October 2012	Aviva Stadium, Dublin, Ireland	Republic of Ireland	6–0	6–1	2014 FIFA World Cup qualification
5	6 September 2013	Allianz Arena, Munich, Germany	Austria	2–0	3–0	2014 FIFA World Cup qualification
6	8 July 2014	Mineirão, Belo Horizonte, Brazil	Brazil	3–0	7–1	2014 FIFA World Cup
7	8 July 2014	Mineirão, Belo Horizonte, Brazil	Brazil	4–0	7–1	2014 FIFA World Cup
8	14 October 2014	Arena AufSchalke, Gelsenkirchen, Germany	Republic of Ireland	1–0	1–1	UEFA Euro 2016 qualification
9	18 November 2014	Balaídos, Vigo, Spain	Spain	1–0	1–0	Friendly
10	26 March 2016	Olympiastadion, Berlin, Germany	England	1–0	2–3	Friendly
11	29 March 2016	Allianz Arena, Munich, Germany	Italy	1–0	4–1	Friendly
12	8 October 2016	Volksparkstadion, Hamburg, Germany	Czech Republic	2–0	3–0	2018 FIFA World Cup qualification
13	23 June 2018	Fisht Olympic Stadium, Sochi, Russia	Sweden	2–1	2–1	2018 FIFA World Cup
14	16 October 2018	Stade de France, Saint-Denis, France	France	1–0	1–2	2018–19 UEFA Nations League A
15	6 September 2019	Volksparkstadion, Hamburg, Germany	Netherlands	2–2	2–4	UEFA Euro 2020 qualification
16	16 November 2019	Borussia-Park, Mönchengladbach, Germany	Belarus	3–0	4–0	UEFA Euro 2020 qualification
17	16 November 2019	Borussia-Park, Mönchengladbach, Germany	Belarus	4–0	4–0	UEFA Euro 2020 qualification

== Honours ==
Bayern Munich

- Bundesliga: 2007–08, 2012–13, 2013–14
- DFB-Pokal: 2007–08, 2012–13, 2013–14
- DFL-Supercup: 2012
- UEFA Champions League: 2012–13
- UEFA Super Cup: 2013
- FIFA Club World Cup: 2013

Real Madrid

- La Liga: 2016–17, 2019–20, 2021–22, 2023–24
- Copa del Rey: 2022–23
- Supercopa de España: 2017, 2020, 2022, 2024
- UEFA Champions League: 2015–16, 2016–17, 2017–18, 2021–22, 2023–24
- UEFA Super Cup: 2014, 2017, 2022
- FIFA Club World Cup: 2014, 2016, 2017, 2018, 2022

Germany

- FIFA World Cup: 2014

Germany U17

- U17 Algarve Tournament: 2007

Individual

- UEFA European Under-17 Championship Golden Player: 2006
- UEFA European Under-17 Championship top tcorer: 2007
- FIFA U-17 World Cup Golden Ball: 2007
- FIFA U-17 World Cup Bronze Shoe: 2007
- Fritz-Walter-Medal U18 Gold Medal: 2008
- kicker Bundesliga Team of the Season: 2009–10, 2011–12
- UEFA Champions League Squad of the Season: 2013–14, 2014–15, 2015–16, 2016–17, 2017–18
- FIFPRO World 11: 2014, 2016, 2017, 2024
- UEFA Team of the Year: 2014, 2016, 2017
- IFFHS World's Best Playmaker: 2014
- IFFHS Men's World Team: 2017, 2024
- IFFHS Men's UEFA Team: 2024
- FIFA World Cup All-Star Team: 2014
- FIFA World Cup Dream Team: 2014
- Silbernes Lorbeerblatt: 2014
- German Player of the Year: 2014
- UEFA European Championship Team of the Tournament: 2016
- La Liga top assist provider: 2016–17
- UEFA La Liga Team of the Season: 2016–17, 2019–20
- IFFHS World Team of the Decade: 2011–2020
- IFFHS UEFA Team of the Decade: 2011–2020
- German Footballer of the Year: 2018, 2024
- GQ German Athlete of the Year: 2019
- Golden Player Man Award: 2024
- FIFA Men's World 11: 2024
- Laureus Sporting Inspiration Award: 2026

Orders

- Silbernes Lorbeerblatt: 2010, 2014
- Knight Commander's Cross of the Order of Merit of the Federal Republic of Germany: 2025

== See also ==
- List of footballers with 100 or more UEFA Champions League appearances
- List of men's footballers with 100 or more international caps
