= 2011–12 FC Bayern Munich season =

112th season in existence of Bayern Munich

Bayern Munich
2011–12 season
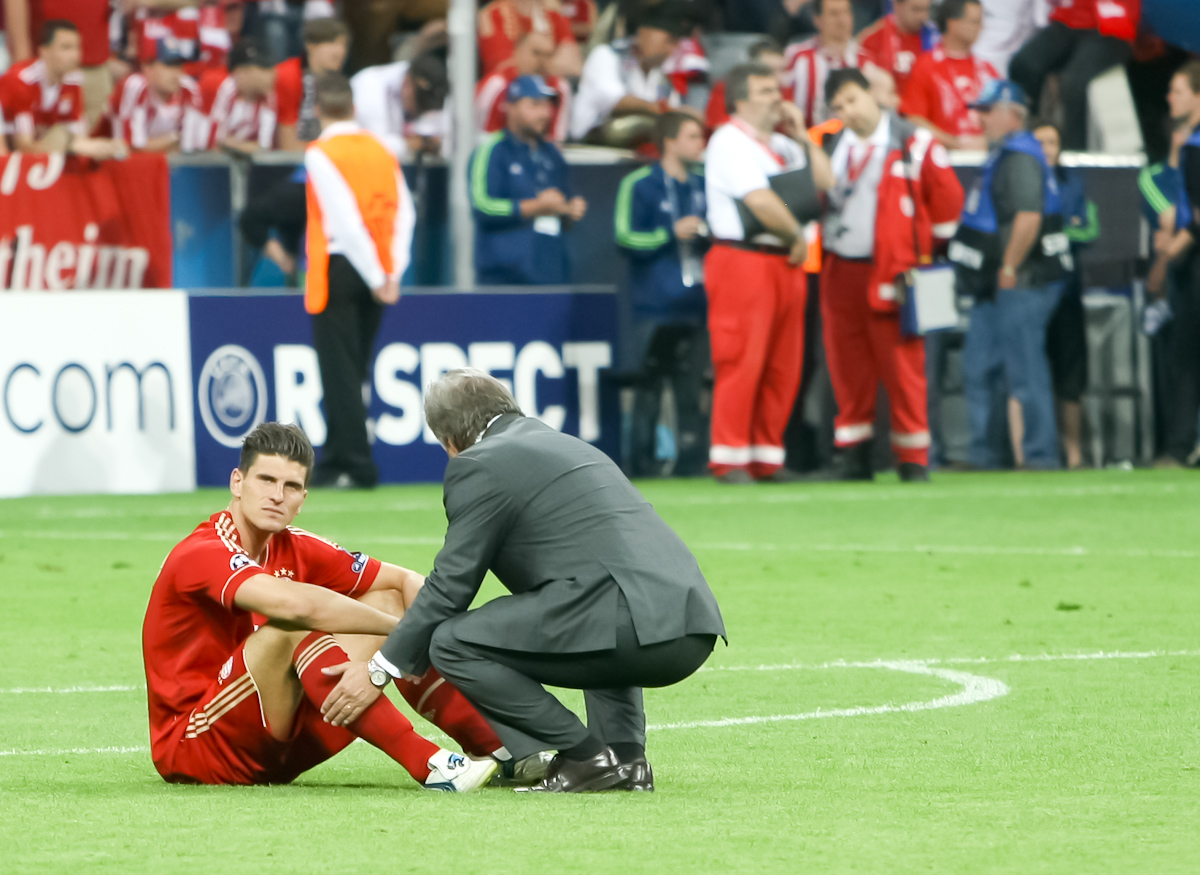
- Jupp Heynckes (right) consoles Mario Gómez (left) after their defeat in the 2012 UEFA Champions League final at the Allianz Arena
- President: Uli Hoeneß
- Head coach: Jupp Heynckes
- Stadium: Allianz Arena
- Bundesliga: 2nd
- DFB-Pokal: Runners-up
- UEFA Champions League: Runners-up
- Top goalscorer: League: Mario Gómez (26); All: Mario Gómez (41)
- Highest home attendance: 69,000 vs. Bor. Mönchengladbach, 7 August 2011; 69,000 vs. Hamburger SV, 20 August 2011
- Lowest home attendance: 64,000 vs. FC Ingolstadt, 26 October 2011
Home colours	Away colours	Third colours

The 2011–12 season of Bayern Munich began on 27 June with their first training session. In the yearly Forbes' list of the most valuable football clubs, Bayern Munich were ranked the fifth-most valuable team in the world.

== Review and events ==
Nils Petersen of Energie Cottbus became the first official signing of Bayern's 2011–12 season. The next two signings were Schalke 04 goalkeeper Manuel Neuer followed shortly thereafter by former Schalke right-back Rafinha (after having spent one season at Genoa). On 27 June 2011, it was announced that Gamba Osaka's Japanese teenage prodigy Takashi Usami would be joining Bayern on a one-season loan (with an option to make the switch permanent). Usami became the first Japanese player ever to play for Bayern. On 14 July, Bayern confirmed the signing of the defender Jérôme Boateng from Manchester City, following drawn-out negotiations.

In light of the signing of Neuer, goalkeeper Thomas Kraft departed for newly promoted Hertha BSC. Andreas Ottl also joined Hertha. Hamit Altıntop joined Real Madrid, while Miroslav Klose opted to join Lazio after negotiations with Bayern over a new contract failed. All these players left on free transfers. Mehmet Ekici joined Werder Bremen for €5 million.

On 1 August, Bayern played their first competitive match of the season against Eintracht Braunschweig. The match was the competitive debut for Manuel Neuer, Jérôme Boateng and Rafinha. The match saw the beginning of Jupp Heynckes' third stint in charge of the club. Bayern won the match with goals from Mario Gómez, Bastian Schweinsteiger and Thomas Müller.

Bayern finished runners-up to Jürgen Klopp's Borussia Dortmund side in both the Bundesliga and the DFB-Pokal. They also reached the final of the 2011–12 Champions League, where they would face Chelsea. The match was played at the Allianz Arena, which meant that Bayern were the first team to have home advantage since Roma in 1984. Neither team would score until Thomas Müller gave Bayern the lead in the 83rd minute. Five minutes later, Didier Drogba equalised for Chelsea, taking the match into extra time, during which Bayern were awarded a penalty, to be taken by Arjen Robben. Chelsea goalkeeper Petr Čech saved his shot. The game then went into a penalty shoot-out, which Bayern would ultimately lose.

== Friendlies ==
=== Pre-season ===
==== LIGA total! Cup 2011 ====
Bayern played in the 2011 LIGA total! Cup. The tournament was held in the Coface Arena and organized by Bayern's prime sponsor Deutsche Telekom. In this tournament matches consisted of two 30 minutes halves each. The Reds faced Hamburger SV in the first game and Mainz 05 in the second game. Borussia Dortmund was the winner of the tournament.

19 July 2011 Semi-final	Bayern Munich	1–2	Hamburger SV	Coface Arena
20:30 CET	Kroos 57'	(report)	Son 6', 30'	Attendance: 30,900; Referee: Tobias Christ (Münchweiler)

20 July 2011 Third Place	Mainz 05	2–2 (4–5 p)	Bayern Munich	Coface Arena
18:45 CET	Noveski 11'; Ujah 59'	(report)	Alaba 30'; Petersen 57'	Attendance: 33,500; Referee: Jochen Drees (Bad Kreuznach)
	Penalties
	Soto (penalty scored); Slišković (penalty scored); Yılmaz (penalty scored); Stieber (penalty scored); Noveski (penalty missed); Ujah (penalty missed)		(penalty scored) Alaba; (penalty scored) Müller; (penalty missed) Petersen; (penalty scored) Kroos; (penalty scored) Tymoshchuk; (penalty scored) Pranjić

==== Audi Cup 2011 ====
Bayern played the 2011 Audi Cup at home in the Allianz Arena, with Milan, Barcelona and Internacional from Brazil in a four-team, knockout tournament.

26 July 2011 Semi-final	Bayern Munich	1–1 (5–3 p)	Milan	Allianz Arena
20:45 CET	Kroos 34'	Report	Ibrahimović 4'	Attendance: 69,901; Referee: Peter Sippel (Munich)
	Penalties
	Alaba (penalty scored); Gómez (penalty scored); Müller (penalty scored); Kroos (penalty scored); Schweinsteiger (penalty scored)		(penalty scored) Robinho; (penalty scored) Oddo; (penalty scored) Silva; (penalty missed) Paloschi

27 July 2011 Final	Barcelona	2–0	Bayern Munich	Allianz Arena
20:45 CET	Thiago 42', 75'	Report		Attendance: 69,901; Referee: Wolfgang Stark (Ergolding)

==== Other friendlies ====
Bayern travelled to Trentino, Italy, in early July to play a Trentino regional XI and the Qatar national team in friendlies. After that, Bayern played Carl Zeiss Jena in a benefit match. Between the LIGA total! Cup and the Audi Cup, Bayern played the annual Dream Game against two official fan clubs in Passau. The season officially started on 1 August with the Round 1 of the DFB-Pokal against Eintracht Braunschweig. The first Bundesliga match was against Borussia Mönchengladbach on 7 August 2011. After the Bundesliga started, Bayern played a benefit match against the club from Thomas Müller's home town.

6 July 2011	Trentino XI	0–15	Bayern Munich	Arco Stadium
17:00 CET		(report)	Gómez 6', 41'; Schweinsteiger 14', 17'; Kroos 20', 39'; Tymoshchuk 26'; Robben 47' (pen.); Luiz Gustavo 51'; Petersen 61', 86', 87'; Olić 65'; Pranjić 80'; Köz 85'	Attendance: 3,000; Referee: Kerschbaumer (Bolzano)

9 July 2011	Bayern Munich	4–2	Qatar	Arco Stadium
17:00 CET	Van Buyten 7'; Müller 34'; Petersen 57'; Olić 83'	(report)	Quintana 67'; Razak 85'	Attendance: 4,000; Referee: Gabriele Mery (Bolzano)

14 July 2011	Carl Zeiss Jena	0–2	Bayern Munich	Ernst-Abbe-Sportfeld
18:00 CET		(report)	Alaba 54'; Petersen 70'	Attendance: 12,641; Referee: Peter Gagelmann (Bremen)

23 July 2011 Dream Game	Red Bulls Taubenbach/FanClub Mia san Mia Schalding l.d. Donau	2–16	Bayern Munich	Drei Flüsse Stadion
16:00 CET	Unknown	(report)	Gómez; Müller; Petersen; Kroos; Robben; Schweinsteiger; Van Buyten	Attendance: 19,000

28 August 2011	TSV Pähl	1–22	Bayern Munich	Penzberg Nonnenwald
14:00 CET	Mühlbauer 68'	(report)	Usami 1', 17', 45'; Petersen 7', 11', 13', 55', 85', 87', 89'; Lahm 18'; Müller 19'; Tymoshchuk 24'; Kroos 28', 37'; Alaba 60'; Ribéry 65', 80', 88'; Schweinsteiger 73', 81'; Contento 77'	Attendance: 6,000

=== Mid-season ===
Bayern's winter training camp took place in Doha, Qatar, from 2 January until 9 January 2012. There, Bayern played against Al-Sailiya S.C., the "African Club of the Century" Al-Ahly S.C. from Cairo and a local U-19. After that, they played the Audi Football Summit in India against the India National Team and Rot-Weiß Erfurt in a benefit match.

5 January 2012	Al-Sailiya S.C.	0–13	Bayern Munich	Aspire Academy
17:30 local, 15:30 CET		(report)	Robben 36'; Gómez 37'; Müller 45'; Olić 50', 62', 74', 82', 84'; Petersen 52', 85'; Ribéry 73', 77'; Contento 78'

7 January 2012	Bayern Munich	2–1	Al-Ahly	Al-Rayyan Stadium
21:00 local, 19:00 CET	Olić 31', 90+4'	(report)	Barakat 49'	Attendance: 8,000; Referee: Faisal Abdullah (Qatar)

8 January 2012	Aspire Academy U-19	0–5	Bayern Munich	Aspire Academy
17:00 local, 15:00 CET		(report)	Usami 38', 41', 43', 48', 57'

10 January 2012 Audi Football Summit	India	0–4	Bayern Munich	Nehru Stadium
18:00 local, 13:30 CET		(report)	Gómez 14'; Müller 29', 37'; Schweinsteiger 43'	Attendance: 35,000; Referee: Santosh Kumar (India)

15 January 2012	Rot-Weiß Erfurt	0–4	Bayern Munich	Steigerwaldstadion
14:00 CET		(report)	Kroos 12'; Robben 38'; Müller 60'; Schweinsteiger 90' (pen.)	Attendance: 18,000; Referee: Jan Seidel (Hennigsdorf)

=== Post-season ===
Bayern played against the Netherlands national team in a compensation match for Arjen Robben's injury during the 2010 FIFA World Cup.

22 May 2012	Bayern Munich	3–2	Netherlands	Allianz Arena
20:30 CEST	Kroos 17'; Petersen 28'; Gómez 87'	(report)	Huntelaar 18'; Narsingh 20'

== Competitions ==
=== Bundesliga ===
The 2011–12 Bundesliga campaign began on 7 August when Bayern played in the opening game of the season against Borussia Mönchengladbach.

==== League table ====
Pos	Team	Pld	W	D	L	GF	GA	GD	Pts	Qualification or relegation
1	Borussia Dortmund (C)	34	25	6	3	80	25	+55	81	Qualification to Champions League group stage
2	Bayern Munich	34	23	4	7	77	22	+55	73	Qualification to Champions League group stage
3	Schalke 04	34	20	4	10	74	44	+30	64	Qualification to Champions League group stage
4	Borussia Mönchengladbach	34	17	9	8	49	24	+25	60	Qualification to Champions League play-off round
5	Bayer Leverkusen	34	15	9	10	52	44	+8	54	Qualification to Europa League group stage (Note: The 2011–12 DFB-Pokal champions (Borussia Dortmund) and runners-up (Bayern Munich) qualified for the 2012–13 UEFA Champions League, thus the three Europa League places were distributed through league positions.)

Source: kicker
Rules for classification: 1) points; 2) goal difference; 3) number of goals scored.
(C) Champions
Notes:

Match	Date	Ground	Opponent	Score^{1}	Pos.	Pts.	GD	Report
1	7 August	H	Borussia Mönchengladbach	0 – 1	12	0	-1	Report / Report link; Kick off / 17:30 CEST; Attendance / 69,000 (sell-out); Referee / Babak Rafati (Hanover); Bayern Munich / Borussia Mönchengladbach; / De Camargo 62', (yellow card) 73'
2	13 August	A	VfL Wolfsburg	1 – 0	10	3	0	Report / Report link; Kick off / 15:30 CEST; Attendance / 30,000 (sell-out); Referee / Knut Kircher (Rottenburg); VfL Wolfsburg / Bayern Munich; / Kroos (yellow card) 42'; Lahm (yellow card) 64'; Rafinha (yellow card) 84'; Luiz Gustavo 90+1'
3	20 August	H	Hamburger SV	5 – 0	2	6	5	Report / Report link; Kick off / 15:30 CEST; Attendance / 69,000 (sell-out); Referee / Michael Weiner (Giesen); Bayern Munich / Hamburger SV; van Buyten 13'; Ribéry 17'; Robben 34'; Tymoshchuk (yellow card) 48'; Gómez 56'; Olić 80'; Rafinha (yellow card) 70' / Aogo (yellow card) 7'; Westermann (yellow card) 32'; Mancienne (yellow card) 37'; Jansen (yellow card) 55'
4	27 August	A	1. FC Kaiserslautern	3 – 0	1	9	8	Report / Report link; Kick off / 15:30 CEST; Attendance / 49,780 (sell-out); Referee / Peter Gagelmann (Bremen); 1. FC Kaiserslautern / Bayern Munich; Petsos (yellow card) 39'; Rodnei (yellow card) 55'; Fortounis (yellow card) 58'; Iličević (red card) 90' / Gómez 37' (pen.), 55', 69' (penalty missed) 55'; Alaba (yellow card) 38'
5	10 September	H	SC Freiburg	7 – 0	1	12	15	Report / Report link; Kick off / 15:30 CEST; Attendance / 69,000 (sell-out); Referee / Tobias Welz (Wiesbaden); Bayern Munich / SC Freiburg; Gómez 8', 52', 55', 71' (pen.); Ribéry 26', 41'; Petersen 90'
6	18 September	A	Schalke 04	2 – 0	1	15	17	Report / Report link; Kick off / 17:30 CEST; Attendance / 61,673 (sell-out); Referee / Florian Meyer (Burgdorf); Schalke 04 / Bayern Munich; / Petersen 21'; Müller 75'
7	24 September	H	Bayer Leverkusen	3 – 0	1	18	20	Report / Report link; Kick off / 18:30 CEST; Attendance / 69,000 (sell-out); Referee / Manuel Gräfe (Berlin); Bayern Munich / Bayer Leverkusen; Müller 5'; Van Buyten 19'; Robben 90'
8	1 October	A	1899 Hoffenheim	0 – 0	1	19	20	Report / Report link; Kick off / 15:30 CEST; Attendance / 30,150 (sell-out); Referee / Thorsten Kinhöfer (Herne)
9	15 October	H	Hertha BSC	4 – 0	1	22	24	Report / Report link; Kick off / 15:30 CEST; Attendance / 69,000 (sell-out); Referee / Michael Weiner (Giesen); Bayern Munich / Hertha BSC; Gómez 5', 69' (pen.); Ribéry 7'; Schweinsteiger 13' / Raffael (yellow card) 41'
10	23 October	A	Hannover 96	1 – 2	1	22	23	Report / Report link; Kick off / 15:30 CEST; Attendance / 49,000 (sell-out); Referee / Manuel Gräfe (Berlin); Hannover 96 / Bayern Munich; Abdellaoue 23' (pen.); Schulz (yellow card) 28'; Pinto (yellow card) 43'; Schmiedebach (yellow card) 49'; Pander 50'; Zieler (yellow card) 58'; Cherundolo (yellow card) 33' (yellow-red card) 63' / Boateng (red card) 28'; Alaba 83'; Ribéry (yellow card) 84'
11	29 October	H	1. FC Nürnberg	4 – 0	1	25	27	Report / Report link; Kick off / 15:30 CEST; Attendance / 69,000 (sell-out); Referee / Florian Meyer (Burgdorf); Bayern Munich / 1. FC Nürnberg; Gómez 2', 68'; Schweinsteiger 19'; Ribéry 39'; Luiz Gustavo (yellow card) 79' / Judt (yellow card) 32'; Cohen (yellow card) 47'
12	6 November	A	FC Augsburg	2 – 1	1	28	28	Report / Report link; Kick off / 15:30 CET; Attendance / 30,660 (sell-out); Referee / Felix Zwayer (Berlin); FC Augsburg / Bayern Munich; Hosogai 59'; Reinhardt (yellow card) 76' / Gómez 16'; Rafinha (yellow card) 20'; Ribéry 28' (yellow card) 67'; Tymoshchuk (red card) 90+3'
13	19 November	H	Borussia Dortmund	0 – 1	1	28	27	Report / Report link; Kick off / 15:30 CET; Attendance / 69,000 (sell-out); Referee / Peter Gagelmann (Bremen); Bayern Munich / Borussia Dortmund; Luiz Gustavo (yellow card) 39'; Badstuber (yellow card) 60' / Götze 65'; Kehl (yellow card) 73'
14	27 November	A	Mainz 05	2 – 3	3	28	26	Report / Report link; Kick off / 15:30 CET; Attendance / 34,000 (sell-out); Referee / Knut Kircher (Rottenburg); Mainz 05 / Bayern Munich; Ivanschitz 11'; Caligiuri 66'; Bungert 74' / van Buyten 56', 79'
15	3 December	H	Werder Bremen	4 – 1	1	31	29	Report / Report link; Kick off / 15:30 CET; Attendance / 69,000 (sell-out); Referee / Florian Meyer (Burgdorf); Bayern Munich / Werder Bremen; Ribéry 22', 77'; Robben 69' (pen.), 83' (pen.) / Rosenberg 52'
16	11 December	A	VfB Stuttgart	2 – 1	1	34	30	Report / Report link; Kick off / 17:30 CET; Attendance / 60,469 (sell-out); Referee / Manuel Gräfe (Berlin); VfB Stuttgart / Bayern Munich; Gentner 6', (yellow card) 12'; Molinaro (yellow card) 24' (yellow-red card) 29'; Boka (yellow card) 27'; Niedermeier (yellow card) 90+1' / Gómez 13', 57', (yellow card) 86'; Müller (yellow card) 25'; Badstuber (yellow card) 69'; Rafinha (yellow card) 83'
17	16 December	H	1. FC Köln	3 – 0	1	37	33	Report / Report link; Kick off / 20:30 CET; Attendance / 69,000 (sell-out); Referee / Guido Winkmann (Kerken); Bayern Munich / 1. FC Köln; Gómez 48'; Alaba 63'; Kroos 88'; Ribéry (yellow card) 33' (yellow-red card) / Sereno (yellow card) 33'; Jajalo (yellow card) 65'; Peszko (yellow card) 66'; McKenna (yellow card) 85'
18	20 January	A	Borussia Mönchengladbach	1 – 3	1	37	31	Report / Report link; Kick off / 20:30 CET; Attendance / 54,047 (sell-out); Referee / Thorsten Kinhöfer (Herne); Borussia Mönchengladbach / Bayern Munich; Reus 11'; Herrmann 41', 71'; Arango (yellow card) 70' / Schweinsteiger 76'
19	28 January	H	VfL Wolfsburg	2 – 0	1	40	33	Kick off / 15:30 CET; Attendance / 69,000 (sell-out); Referee / Felix Zwayer (Berlin); Bayern Munich / VfL Wolfsburg; Gómez 60'; Rafinha (yellow card) 79'; Robben 90+2' / Russ (yellow card) 47'; Hasebe (yellow card) 59'
20	4 February	A	Hamburger SV	1 – 1	2	41	33	Report / Report link; Kick off / 18:30 CET; Attendance / 57,000 (sell-out); Referee / Knut Kircher (Rottenburg); Hamburger SV / Bayern Munich; Sala 23'; Westermann (yellow card) 25'; Rincón (yellow card) 63' / Boateng (yellow card) 56'; Kroos (yellow card) 61'; Olić 71'
21	11 February	H	1. FC Kaiserslautern	2 – 0	2	44	35	Report / Report link; Kick off / 15:30 CET; Attendance / 69,000 (sell-out); Referee / Markus Schmidt (Stuttgart); Bayern Munich / 1. FC Kaiserslautern; Gómez 6'; Müller 30'; Lahm (yellow card) 45' / Petsos (yellow card) 29'; Wagner (yellow card) 85'
22	18 February	A	SC Freiburg	0 – 0	3	45	35	Report / Report link; Kick off / 18:30 CET; Attendance / 24,000 (sell-out); Referee / Peter Gagelmann (Bremen); SC Freiburg / Bayern Munich; Diagne (yellow card) 8'; Rosenthal (yellow card) 70' / Ribéry (yellow card) 51'
23	26 February	H	Schalke 04	2 – 0	2	48	37	Report / Report link; Kick off / 15:30 CET; Attendance / 69,000 (sell-out); Referee / Michael Weiner (Giesen); Bayern Munich / Schalke 04; Ribéry 36', 55', (yellow card) 35' / Fuchs (yellow card) 21'; Höger (yellow card) 25'
24	3 March	A	Bayer Leverkusen	0 – 2	2	48	35	Report / Report link; Kick off / 15:30 CET; Attendance / 30,210 (sell-out); Referee / Manuel Gräfe (Berlin); Bayer Leverkusen / Bayern Munich; Toprak (yellow card) 66'; Kießling 79'; Bellarabi 90' / Boateng (yellow card) 65'; Luiz Gustavo (yellow card) 84'; Rafinha (yellow card) 90+4'
25	10 March	H	1899 Hoffenheim	7 – 1	2	51	41	Report / Report link; Kick off / 15:30 CET; Attendance / 69,000 (sell-out); Referee / Marco Fritz (Korb); Bayern Munich / 1899 Hoffenheim; Gómez 5', 35', 48'; Robben 12' (pen.), 20'; Kroos 18'; Ribéry 58' / Luiz Gustavo 85' (o.g.); Vukčević (yellow card) 72'
26	17 March	A	Hertha BSC	6 – 0	2	54	47	Report / Report link; Kick off / 18:30 CET; Attendance / 74,244 (sell-out); Referee / Tobias Welz (Wiesbaden); Hertha BSC / Bayern Munich; Raffael (yellow card) 24'; Hubník (yellow card) 65'; Morales (yellow card) 66' / Müller 9'; Robben 12', 19' (pen.), 67' (pen.); Gómez 50' (pen.); Kroos 51'; Boateng (yellow card) 63'
27	24 March	H	Hannover 96	2 – 1	2	57	48	Report / Report link; Kick off / 15:30 CET; Attendance / 69,000 (sell-out); Referee / Guido Winkmann (Kerken); Bayern Munich / Hannover 96; Pranjić (yellow card) 7'; Kroos 36'; Gómez 68' / Cherundolo (yellow card) 10'; Ya Konan 74', (yellow card) 89'
28	31 March	A	1. FC Nürnberg	1 – 0	2	60	49	Report / Report link; Kick off / 15:30 CEST; Attendance / 48,548 (sell-out); Referee / Felix Zwayer (Berlin); 1. FC Nürnberg / Bayern Munich; Wollscheid (yellow card) 73'; Chandler (yellow card) 90' / Robben 69', (yellow card) 90+3'; Luiz Gustavo (yellow card) 88'
29	7 April	H	FC Augsburg	2 – 1	2	63	50	Report / Report link; Kick off / 15:30 CEST; Attendance / 69,000 (sell-out); Referee / Florian Meyer (Burgdorf); Bayern Munich / FC Augsburg; Gómez 1', 60'; Badstuber (yellow card) 38' / Koo 23'
30	11 April	A	Borussia Dortmund	0 – 1	2	63	49	Report / Report link; Kick off / 20:00 CEST; Attendance / 80,720 (sell-out); Referee / Knut Kircher (Rottenburg); Borussia Dortmund / Bayern Munich; Lewandowski 77'
31	14 April	H	Mainz 05	0 – 0	2	64	49	Report / Report link; Kick off / 18:30 CEST; Attendance / 69,000 (sell-out); Referee / Markus Schmidt (Stuttgart); Bayern Munich / Mainz 05; Badstuber (yellow card) 24' / Müller (yellow card) 62'
32	21 April	A	Werder Bremen	2 – 1	2	67	50	Report / Report link; Kick off / 15:30 CEST; Attendance / 42,100 (sell-out); Referee / Manuel Gräfe (Berlin); Werder Bremen / Bayern Munich; Naldo 51' / Naldo 75' (o.g.); Ribéry 90'
33	28 April	H	VfB Stuttgart	2 – 0	2	70	52	Report / Report link; Kick off / 15:30 CEST; Attendance / 69,000 (sell-out); Referee / Thorsten Kinhöfer (Herne); Bayern Munich / VfB Stuttgart; Gómez 32'; Müller 90+2'; Rafinha (yellow card) 78' / Niedermeier (yellow card) 44'
34	5 May	A	1. FC Köln	4 – 1	2	73	55	Report / Report link; Kick off / 15:30 CEST; Attendance / 50,000 (sell-out); Referee / Florian Meyer (Burgdorf); 1. FC Köln / Bayern Munich; Peszko (yellow card) 60'; Novaković 63' / Müller 34', 85'; Geromel 52' (o.g.); Robben 54'; Schweinsteiger (yellow card) 71'

Last updated: 5 May 2012
Source: DFB.de
^{1}Bayern Munich goals come first.
Ground's country's flag and opponent's country's flag shown when from a different country of Bayern Munich.
Pos. = Position in league, Pts. = Points, GD = Goal difference, Ground: H = Home, A = Away, N = Neutral, HR = Home replacement, AR = Away replacement.

=== DFB-Pokal ===
Bayern kicked off the 2011–12 DFB-Pokal against Eintracht Braunschweig in Braunschweig, where they advanced to the second round with a 3–0 victory.

1 August 2011 Round 1	Eintracht Braunschweig	0–3	Bayern Munich	Braunschweig
20:30 CEST		Report	Gómez 9' (pen.); Schweinsteiger 39' (pen.); Müller 83'	Stadium: Eintracht-Stadion; Attendance: 23,645 (sell-out); Referee: Felix Zwayer (Berlin)

26 October 2011 Round 2	Bayern Munich	6–0	FC Ingolstadt	Munich
20:30 CEST	Müller 33'; Alaba 49'; Petersen 53', 70'; Matip 82' (o.g.); Usami 90'	Report		Stadium: Allianz Arena; Attendance: 64,000; Referee: Guido Winkmann (Kerken)

20 December 2011 Round 3	VfL Bochum	1–2	Bayern Munich	Bochum
19:00 CET	Federico 26'	Report	Kroos 52'; Robben 90+1'	Stadium: Ruhrstadion; Attendance: 29,299 (sell-out); Referee: Michael Weiner (Giesen)

8 February 2012 Quarter-finals	VfB Stuttgart	0–2	Bayern Munich	Stuttgart
20:30 CET		Report	Ribéry 30'; Gómez 46'	Stadium: Mercedes-Benz Arena; Attendance: 57,500; Referee: Florian Meyer (Burgdorf)

21 March 2012 Semi-finals	Borussia Mönchengladbach	0–0 (a.e.t.) (2–4 p)	Bayern Munich	Mönchengladbach
20:30 CET		Report		Stadium: Borussia-Park; Attendance: 54,049 (sell-out); Referee: Thorsten Kinhöfer (Herne)
	Penalties
	Daems (penalty scored); Herrmann (penalty scored); Dante (penalty missed); Nordtveit (penalty missed)		(penalty scored) Alaba; (penalty scored) Ribéry; (penalty scored) Lahm; (penalty scored) Kroos

12 May 2012 Final	Borussia Dortmund	5–2	Bayern Munich	Berlin
20:30 CEST	Kagawa 3'; Hummels 41' (pen.); Lewandowski 45+1', 58', 81'	Report	Robben 25' (pen.); Ribéry 75'	Stadium: Olympic Stadium; Attendance: 74,794 (sell-out); Referee: Peter Gagelmann (Bremen)

=== UEFA Champions League ===
Bayern Munich qualified for the play-off round of the 2011–12 UEFA Champions League by finishing third in the Bundesliga in 2010–11.

==== Play-off round ====
17 August 2011 First leg	Bayern Munich (Germany)	2–0	(Switzerland) Zürich	Munich, Germany
20:45 CEST	Schweinsteiger 8'; Robben 72'	Report		Stadium: Allianz Arena; Attendance: 66,000; Referee: Aleksei Nikolaev (Russia)

23 August 2011 Second leg	Zürich (Switzerland)	0–1 (0–3 agg.)	(Germany) Bayern Munich	Zürich, Switzerland
20:45 CEST		Report	Gómez 7'	Stadium: Letzigrund; Attendance: 23,600; Referee: Laurent Duhamel (France)

==== Group stage ====
Pos	Team	Pld	W	D	L	GF	GA	GD	Pts	Qualification	BAY	NAP	MCI	VIL
1	(Germany) Bayern Munich	6	4	1	1	11	6	+5	13	Advance to knockout phase	—	3–2	2–0	3–1
2	(Italy) Napoli	6	3	2	1	10	6	+4	11	Advance to knockout phase	1–1	—	2–1	2–0
3	(England) Manchester City	6	3	1	2	9	6	+3	10	Transfer to Europa League	2–0	1–1	—	2–1
4	(Spain) Villarreal	6	0	0	6	2	14	−12	0		0–2	0–2	0–3	—

Source: Soccerway

14 September 2011 1	Villarreal (Spain)	0–2	(Germany) Bayern Munich	Villarreal, Spain
20:45 CEST		Report	Kroos 7'; Rafinha 76'	Stadium: Estadio El Madrigal; Attendance: 19,168; Referee: Cüneyt Çakır (Turkey)

27 September 2011 2	Bayern Munich (Germany)	2–0	(England) Manchester City	Munich, Germany
20:45 CEST	Gómez 38', 45+1'	Report		Stadium: Allianz Arena; Attendance: 66,000; Referee: Viktor Kassai (Hungary)

18 October 2011 3	Napoli (Italy)	1–1	(Germany) Bayern Munich	Naples, Italy
20:45 CEST	Badstuber 39' (o.g.)	Report	Kroos 2'	Stadium: Stadio San Paolo; Attendance: 60,074; Referee: Olegário Benquerença (Portugal)

2 November 2011 4	Bayern Munich (Germany)	3–2	(Italy) Napoli	Munich, Germany
20:45 CET	Gómez 17', 23', 42'	Report	Fernández 45', 79'	Stadium: Allianz Arena; Attendance: 66,000; Referee: Björn Kuipers (Netherlands)

22 November 2011 5	Bayern Munich (Germany)	3–1	(Spain) Villarreal	Munich, Germany
20:45 CET	Ribéry 3', 69'; Gómez 23'	Report	De Guzmán 50'	Stadium: Allianz Arena; Attendance: 66,000; Referee: Markus Strömbergsson (Sweden)

7 December 2011 6	Manchester City (England)	2–0	(Germany) Bayern Munich	Manchester, England
20:45 CET	Silva 37'; Y. Touré 52'	Report		Stadium: City of Manchester Stadium; Attendance: 46,002; Referee: Stéphane Lannoy (France)

==== Knockout phase ====
===== Round of 16 =====
22 February 2012 First leg	Basel (Switzerland)	1–0	(Germany) Bayern Munich	Basel, Switzerland
20:45 CET	Stocker 86'	Report		Stadium: St. Jakob-Park; Attendance: 36,000; Referee: Nicola Rizzoli (Italy)

13 March 2012 Second leg	Bayern Munich (Germany)	7–0 (7–1 agg.)	(Switzerland) Basel	Munich, Germany
20:45 CET	Robben 10', 81'; Müller 42'; Gómez 44', 50', 61', 67'	Report		Stadium: Allianz Arena; Attendance: 69,000; Referee: Mark Clattenburg (England)

===== Quarter-finals =====
28 March 2012 First leg	Marseille (France)	0–2	(Germany) Bayern Munich	Marseille, France
20:45 CEST		Report	Gómez 44'; Robben 69'	Stadium: Stade Vélodrome; Attendance: 31,683; Referee: Carlos Velasco Carballo (Spain)

3 April 2012 Second leg	Bayern Munich (Germany)	2–0 (4–0 agg.)	(France) Marseille	Munich, Germany
20:45 CEST	Olić 13', 37'	Report		Stadium: Allianz Arena; Attendance: 66,000; Referee: Svein Oddvar Moen (Norway)

===== Semi-finals =====
17 April 2012 First leg	Bayern Munich (Germany)	2–1	(Spain) Real Madrid	Munich, Germany
20:45 CEST	Ribéry 17'; Badstuber (yellow card) 31'; Robben (yellow card) 37'; Lahm (yellow card) 64'; Gómez 90'	Report	Özil 53'; Alonso (yellow card) 56'; Coentrão (yellow card) 56'; Di María (yellow card) 60'; Ramos (yellow card) 76'; Higuaín (yellow card) 90+2'; Marcelo (yellow card) 90+4'	Stadium: Allianz Arena; Attendance: 66,000; Referee: Howard Webb (England)

25 April 2012 Second leg	Real Madrid (Spain)	2–1 (a.e.t.) (3–3 agg.) (1–3 p)	(Germany) Bayern Munich	Madrid, Spain
20:45 CEST	Ronaldo 6' (pen.), 14'; Pepe (yellow card) 27'; Arbeloa (yellow card) 59'; Granero (yellow card) 115'	Report	Alaba (yellow card) 5'; Robben 27' (pen.), (yellow card) 90'; Luiz Gustavo (yellow card) 102'; Badstuber (yellow card) 104'	Stadium: Santiago Bernabéu; Attendance: 71,654; Referee: Viktor Kassai (Hungary)
	Penalties
	Ronaldo (penalty missed); Kaká (penalty missed); Alonso (penalty scored); Ramos (penalty missed)		(penalty scored) Alaba; (penalty scored) Gómez; (penalty missed) Kroos; (penalty missed) Lahm; (penalty scored) Schweinsteiger

===== Final =====
19 May 2012 Final	Bayern Munich (Germany)	1–1 (3–4 p)	(England) Chelsea	Munich, Germany
20:45 CEST	Schweinsteiger (yellow card) 2'; Müller 83'; Robben (penalty missed) 95'	Report	Ashley Cole (yellow card) 81'; David Luiz (yellow card) 86'; Drogba 88' (yellow card) 93'; F. Torres (yellow card) 120'	Stadium: Allianz Arena; Attendance: 62,500; Referee: Pedro Proença (Portugal)
	Penalties
	Lahm (penalty scored); Gómez (penalty scored); Neuer (penalty scored); Olić (penalty missed); Schweinsteiger (penalty missed)		(penalty missed) Mata; (penalty scored) David Luiz; (penalty scored) Lampard; (penalty scored) Cole; (penalty scored) Drogba

=== Overall record ===
Competition	First match	Last match	Record							
Competition	First match	Last match	G	W	D	L	GF	GA	GD	Win %
Bundesliga	7 August 2011	5 May 2012	34	23	4	7	77	22	+55	67.65
DFB-Pokal	1 August 2011	12 May 2012	6	4	1	1	15	6	+9	66.67
Champions League	17 August 2011	19 May 2012	15	10	2	3	29	11	+18	66.67
Total			55	37	7	11	121	39	+82	67.27

== Squad information ==
Squad Season 2011–12
No.	Player	Nat.	Birthdate	at FCB since	previous club	BL matches	BL goals	Cup matches	Cup goals	CL matches	CL goals
Goalkeepers
1	Manuel Neuer	(Germany)	27 March 1986	2011	Schalke 04	33	0	5	0	14	0
22	Hans-Jörg Butt	(Germany)	28 May 1974	2008	Benfica	1	0	1	0	1	0
24	Maximilian Riedmüller	(Germany)	4 January 1988	2008	SV Heimstetten	0	0	0	0	0	0
32	Rouven Sattelmaier	(Germany)	7 August 1987	2010	Jahn Regensburg	0	0	0	0	0	0
Defenders
2	Breno	(Brazil)	13 October 1989	2008	São Paulo	0	0	0	0	0	0
5	Daniel Van Buyten	(Belgium)	7 February 1978	2006	Hamburger SV	12(1)	4	1(1)	0	6(1)	0
13	Rafinha	(Brazil)	7 September 1985	2011	Genoa	20(4)	0	3(1)	0	5(2)	1
17	Jérôme Boateng	(Germany)	3 September 1988	2011	Manchester City	26(1)	0	6	0	15	0
21	Philipp Lahm (captain)	(Germany)	11 November 1983	1995	Junior Team	31	0	5	0	14	0
26	Diego Contento	(Germany)	1 May 1990	1995	Junior Team	5(6)	0	1(1)	0	2	0
28	Holger Badstuber	(Germany)	13 March 1989	2002	Junior Team	32(1)	0	5	0	12	0
Midfielders
7	Franck Ribéry	(France)	7 April 1983	2007	Marseille	27(5)	12	4	2	14	3
10	Arjen Robben	(Netherlands)	23 January 1984	2009	Real Madrid	18(6)	12	3	2	8(1)	5
14	Takashi Usami	(Japan)	6 May 1992	2011	Gamba Osaka	2(1)	0	0(1)	1	0(1)	0
23	Danijel Pranjić	(Croatia)	2 December 1981	2009	Heerenveen	4(3)	0	1(1)	0	1(4)	0
27	David Alaba	(Austria)	24 June 1992	2008	Junior Team	14(16)	2	4(2)	1	8(3)	0
30	Luiz Gustavo	(Brazil)	23 July 1987	2011	1899 Hoffenheim	18(10)	1	6	0	10(2)	0
31	Bastian Schweinsteiger (vice-captain)	(Germany)	1 August 1984	1998	Junior Team	18(4)	3	3	1	9(2)	1
39	Toni Kroos	(Germany)	4 January 1990	2006	Junior Team	27(4)	4	6	1	14	2
44	Anatoliy Tymoshchuk	(Ukraine)	30 March 1979	2009	Zenit	17(6)	0	2(2)	0	7(5)	0
Forwards
9	Nils Petersen	(Germany)	6 December 1988	2011	Energie Cottbus	2(7)	2	1(1)	2	1(3)	0
11	Ivica Olić	(Croatia)	14 September 1979	2009	Hamburger SV	4(16)	2	1(3)	0	2(3)	2
25	Thomas Müller	(Germany)	13 September 1989	2000	Junior Team	33(1)	7	4(1)	2	9(5)	2
33	Mario Gómez	(Germany)	10 July 1985	2009	VfB Stuttgart	30(3)	26	4(1)	2	13(1)	13
Last updated: 19 May 2012

=== Goal scorers ===
All competitions

Scorer	Goals
(Germany) Mario Gómez	41
(Netherlands) Arjen Robben	19
(France) Franck Ribéry	17
(Germany) Thomas Müller	11
(Germany) Toni Kroos	7
(Germany) Bastian Schweinsteiger	5
(Belgium) Daniel Van Buyten	4
(Croatia) Ivica Olić	4
(Germany) Nils Petersen	4
(Austria) David Alaba	3
(Brazil) Luiz Gustavo	1
(Brazil) Rafinha	1
(Japan) Takashi Usami	1

Bundesliga

Scorer	Goals
(Germany) Mario Gómez	26
(France) Franck Ribéry	12
(Netherlands) Arjen Robben	12
(Germany) Thomas Müller	7
(Belgium) Daniel Van Buyten	4
(Germany) Toni Kroos	4
(Germany) Bastian Schweinsteiger	3
(Austria) David Alaba	2
(Croatia) Ivica Olić	2
(Germany) Nils Petersen	2
(Brazil) Luiz Gustavo	1

UEFA Champions League

Scorer	Goals
(Germany) Mario Gómez	12(1)*
(Netherlands) Arjen Robben	4(1)*
(France) Franck Ribéry	3
(Germany) Toni Kroos	2
(Germany) Thomas Müller	2
(Croatia) Ivica Olić	2
(Brazil) Rafinha	1
(Germany) Bastian Schweinsteiger	(1)*

DFB-Pokal

Scorer	Goals
(Germany) Mario Gómez	2
(Germany) Thomas Müller	2
(Germany) Nils Petersen	2
(France) Franck Ribéry	2
(Netherlands) Arjen Robben	2
(Austria) David Alaba	1
(Germany) Toni Kroos	1
(Germany) Bastian Schweinsteiger	1
(Japan) Takashi Usami	1

()* = Goals in Play-off
Last updated: 20 May 2012

=== Penalties ===
All competitions

Player	Penalties
(Netherlands) Arjen Robben	8(2)*
(Germany) Mario Gómez	5(2)*
(Germany) Bastian Schweinsteiger	1

Bundesliga

Player	Penalties
(Netherlands) Arjen Robben	5(1)*
(Germany) Mario Gómez	4(1)*

UEFA Champions League

Player	Penalties
(Netherlands) Arjen Robben	2(1)*
(Germany) Mario Gómez	(1)*

DFB-Pokal

Player	Penalties
(Germany) Mario Gómez	1
(Netherlands) Arjen Robben	1
(Germany) Bastian Schweinsteiger	1

()* = Penalties saved
Last updated: 20 May 2012

=== Bookings ===
All competitions

Player	Y	YY	R
(Germany) Holger Badstuber	9	1	
(Brazil) Luiz Gustavo	8		
(Brazil) Rafinha	8		
(Germany) Jérôme Boateng	7		1
(Germany) Toni Kroos	7		
(Germany) Bastian Schweinsteiger	7		
(France) Franck Ribéry	6	1	
(Germany) Philipp Lahm	5		
(Austria) David Alaba	4		
(Netherlands) Arjen Robben	4		
(Germany) Mario Gómez	3		
(Germany) Thomas Müller	3		
(Ukraine) Anatoliy Tymoshchuk	3		1
(Belgium) Daniel Van Buyten	2		
(Croatia) Ivica Olić	1		
(Croatia) Danijel Pranjić	1		

Bundesliga

Player	Y	YY	R
(Brazil) Rafinha	7		
(Germany) Holger Badstuber	5		
(Brazil) Luiz Gustavo	5		
(Germany) Toni Kroos	4		
(France) Franck Ribéry	4	1	
(Germany) Jérôme Boateng	3		1
(Germany) Philipp Lahm	3		
(Germany) Mario Gómez	2		
(Germany) Bastian Schweinsteiger	2		
(Ukraine) Anatoliy Tymoshchuk	2		1
(Austria) David Alaba	1		
(Belgium) Daniel Van Buyten	1		
(Germany) Thomas Müller	1		
(Croatia) Danijel Pranjić	1		
(Netherlands) Arjen Robben	1		

UEFA Champions League

Player	Y	YY	R
(Germany) Bastian Schweinsteiger	4		
(Austria) David Alaba	3		
(Germany) Holger Badstuber	3	1	
(Brazil) Luiz Gustavo	3		
(Germany) Jérôme Boateng	2		
(Germany) Toni Kroos	2		
(Germany) Philipp Lahm	2		
(Germany) Thomas Müller	2		
(Germany) Mario Gómez	1		
(Croatia) Ivica Olić	1		
(Brazil) Rafinha	1		
(France) Franck Ribéry	1		
(Netherlands) Arjen Robben	1		
(Ukraine) Anatoliy Tymoshchuk	1		

DFB-Pokal

Player	Y	YY	R
(Germany) Jérôme Boateng	2		
(Netherlands) Arjen Robben	2		
(Germany) Holger Badstuber	1		
(Belgium) Daniel Van Buyten	1		
(Germany) Toni Kroos	1		
(France) Franck Ribéry	1		
(Germany) Bastian Schweinsteiger	1		

Y = Yellow Cards, YY = Sending Offs after Second Yellow Card, R = Sending Offs after Red Card
Last updated: 19 May 2012

=== Minutes played ===
Bundesliga

Player	Minutes
(Germany) Manuel Neuer	2970
(Germany) Holger Badstuber	2896
(Germany) Philipp Lahm	2751
(Germany) Thomas Müller	2700
(Germany) Mario Gómez	2479
(France) Franck Ribéry	2387
(Germany) Toni Kroos	2350

Player	Minutes
(Germany) Jérôme Boateng	2178
(Brazil) Rafinha	1778
(Germany) Bastian Schweinsteiger	1725
(Netherlands) Arjen Robben	1706
(Brazil) Luiz Gustavo	1693
(Ukraine) Anatoliy Tymoshchuk	1559
(Austria) David Alaba	1532

Player	Minutes
(Belgium) Daniel Van Buyten	1052
(Croatia) Ivica Olić	554
(Germany) Diego Contento	493
(Croatia) Danijel Pranjić	274
(Germany) Nils Petersen	213
(Japan) Takashi Usami	167
(Germany) Hans-Jörg Butt	90

Last updated: 5 May 2012

=== Transfers and loans ===
==== Transfers in ====
No.	Pos.	Nat.	Name	Age	EU	Moving from	Type	Transfer window	Ends	Transfer fee	Source
1	GK	(Germany)	Manuel Neuer	25	EU	Schalke 04	Transfer	Summer	2016	€22M	
13	DF	(Brazil)	Rafinha	25	Non-EU	Genoa (Italy)	Transfer	Summer	2014	€5.5M	
9	FW	(Germany)	Nils Petersen	22	EU	Energie Cottbus	Transfer	Summer	2014	€2.8M	
14	MF	(Japan)	Takashi Usami	19	Non-EU	Gamba Osaka (Japan)	Loan	Summer			
17	DF	(Germany)	Jérôme Boateng	22	EU	Manchester City (England)	Transfer	Summer	2015	€13.5M	

Total spending: ▼€43.8 million

==== Transfers out ====
No.	Pos.	Nat.	Name	Age	EU	Moving to	Type	Transfer window	Transfer fee	Source
18	FW	(Germany)	Miroslav Klose	32	EU	Lazio (Italy)	End of contract	Summer	Free	
35	GK	(Germany)	Thomas Kraft	22	EU	Hertha BSC	End of contract	Summer	Free	
16	MF	(Germany)	Andreas Ottl	25	EU	Hertha BSC	End of contract	Summer	Free	
8	MF	(Turkey)	Hamit Altıntop	28	EU	Real Madrid (Spain)	End of contract	Summer	Free	
32	MF	(Turkey)	Mehmet Ekici	20	EU	Werder Bremen	Sold	Summer	€5M	

Total income: ▲€5 million

== Players ==
As of 14 July 2011

Note: Flags indicate national team as defined under FIFA eligibility rules; some limited exceptions apply. Players may hold more than one non-FIFA nationality.

No.	Pos.	Nation	Player
1	GK	GER	Manuel Neuer
2	DF	BRA	Breno
5	DF	BEL	Daniel Van Buyten
7	MF	FRA	Franck Ribéry
9	FW	GER	Nils Petersen
10	MF	NED	Arjen Robben
11	FW	CRO	Ivica Olić
13	DF	BRA	Rafinha
14	MF	JPN	Takashi Usami (on loan from Gamba Osaka)
17	DF	GER	Jérôme Boateng
21	DF	GER	Philipp Lahm (captain)
22	GK	GER	Hans-Jörg Butt

No.	Pos.	Nation	Player
23	MF	CRO	Danijel Pranjić
24	GK	GER	Maximilian Riedmüller
25	FW	GER	Thomas Müller
26	DF	GER	Diego Contento
27	DF	AUT	David Alaba
28	DF	GER	Holger Badstuber
30	MF	BRA	Luiz Gustavo
31	MF	GER	Bastian Schweinsteiger (vice captain)
32	GK	GER	Rouven Sattelmaier
33	FW	GER	Mario Gómez
39	MF	GER	Toni Kroos
44	MF	UKR	Anatoliy Tymoshchuk

== Management and coaching staff ==
Position	Staff
Manager	(Germany) Jupp Heynckes
Assistant manager	(Germany) Peter Hermann
Assistant manager	(Germany) Hermann Gerland
Goalkeeping coach	(Croatia) Toni Tapalović
Sports psychologist	(Germany) Philipp Laux
Sports rehab coach	(Germany) Thomas Wilhelmi
Fitness coach	(Brazil) Marcelo Martins
Fitness coach	(Germany) Andreas Kornmayer

As of 1 July 2011
