= Austrian Footballer of the Year =

Annual football award

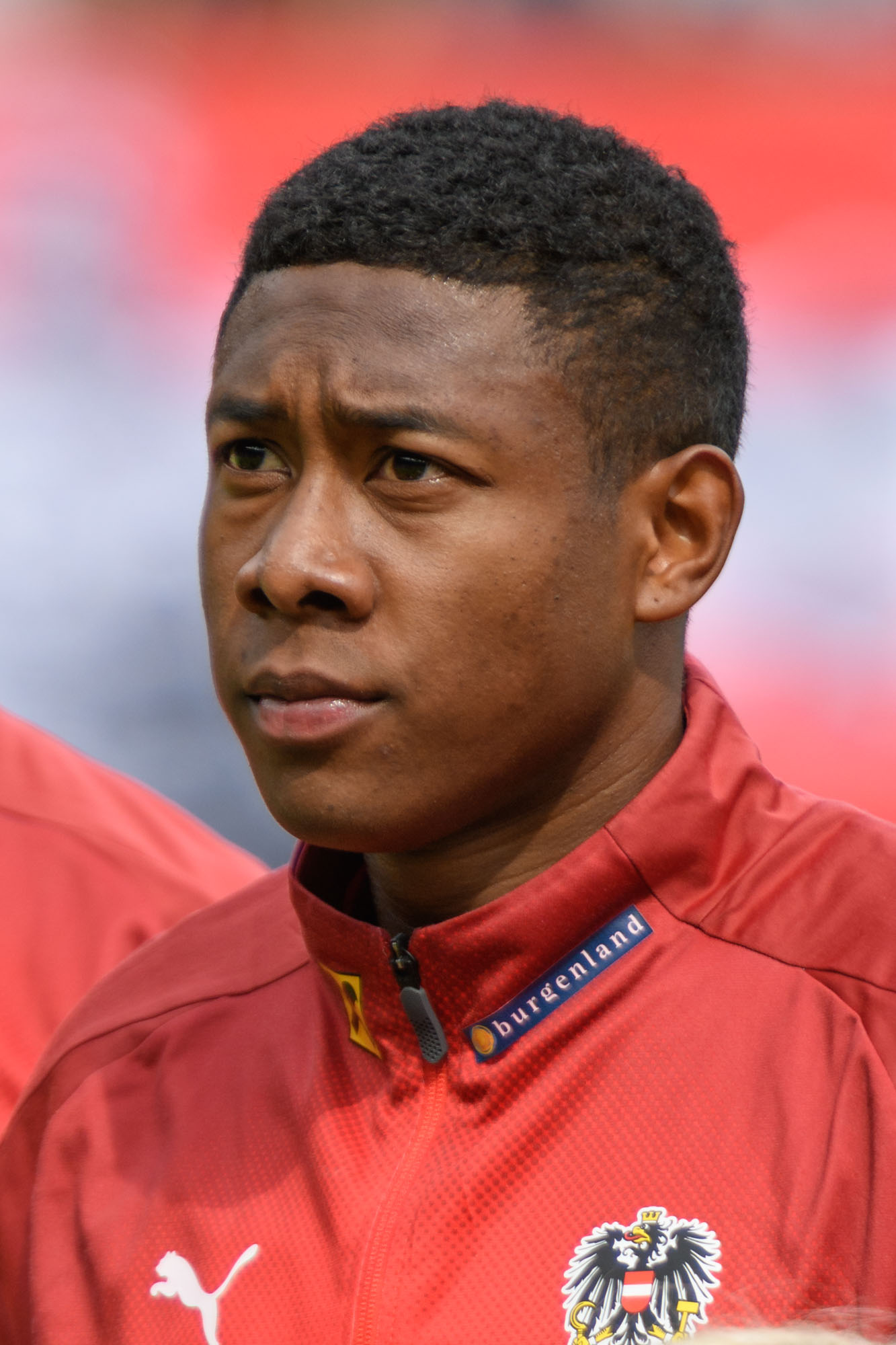
David Alaba has won the award a record 10 times

The Austrian Footballer of the Year award (German: APA-Fußballerwahl) is an annual football award, established in Austria in 1984 and sponsored by the Austria Press Agency (APA). The coaches of all Austrian Football Bundesliga clubs vote to elect the player of the year. Eligible for selection are all players playing in the Austrian league, as well as any Austrian player playing abroad. The winners for the preceding year are usually announced in January.

== List of winners ==
Year	Player (Wins)	Nat.	Age	Pos.	Club(s)
1984	Herbert Prohaska	AUT	29	MF	Austria Wien
1985	Herbert Prohaska (2)	AUT	30	MF	Austria Wien
1986	Toni Polster	AUT	22	FW	Austria Wien
1987	Heribert Weber	AUT	32	DF	Rapid Wien
1988	Herbert Prohaska (3)	AUT	33	MF	Austria Wien
1989	Gerhard Rodax	AUT	24	FW	Admira Wacker
1990	Andreas Ogris	AUT	26	FW	Austria Wien; Espanyol
1991	Néstor Gorosito	ARG	27	MF	Tirol Innsbruck
1992	Andreas Herzog	AUT	24	MF	Rapid Wien; Werder Bremen
1993	Franz Wohlfahrt	AUT	29	GK	Austria Wien
1994	Heimo Pfeifenberger	AUT	28	FW	Austria Salzburg
1995	Ivica Vastić	CRO	26	MF	Sturm Graz
1996	Michael Konsel	AUT	34	GK	Rapid Wien
1997	Toni Polster (2)	AUT	33	FW	1. FC Köln
1998	Ivica Vastić (2)	AUT	29	MF	Sturm Graz
1999	Ivica Vastić (3)	AUT	30	MF	Sturm Graz
2000	Radosław Gilewicz	POL	29	FW	Tirol Innsbruck
2001	Ronald Brunmayr	AUT	26	FW	Grazer AK
2002	Vladimír Janočko	SVK	26	MF	Austria Wien
2003	Andreas Ivanschitz	AUT	20	MF	Rapid Wien
2004	Steffen Hofmann	GER	24	MF	Rapid Wien
2005	Mario Bazina	CRO	30	MF	Grazer AK
2006	Alexander Zickler	GER	32	FW	Red Bull Salzburg
2007	Ivica Vastić (4)	AUT	38	MF	LASK
2008	Marc Janko	AUT	25	FW	Red Bull Salzburg
2009	Steffen Hofmann (2)	GER	29	MF	Rapid Wien
2010	Zlatko Junuzović	AUT	23	MF	Austria Wien
2011	David Alaba	AUT	19	DF	Bayern Munich; TSG Hoffenheim
2012	David Alaba (2)	AUT	20	DF	Bayern Munich
2013	David Alaba (3)	AUT	21	DF	Bayern Munich
2014	David Alaba (4)	AUT	22	DF	Bayern Munich
2015	David Alaba (5)	AUT	23	DF	Bayern Munich
2016	David Alaba (6)	AUT	24	DF	Bayern Munich
2017	Marcel Sabitzer	AUT	24	MF	RB Leipzig
2018	Marko Arnautović	AUT	29	FW	West Ham United
2019	Erling Haaland	NOR	19	FW	Red Bull Salzburg
2020	David Alaba (7)	AUT	28	DF	Bayern Munich
2021	David Alaba (8)	AUT	29	DF	Bayern Munich; Real Madrid
2022	David Alaba (9)	AUT	30	DF	Real Madrid
2023	David Alaba (10)	AUT	31	DF	Real Madrid
2024	Christoph Baumgartner	AUT	25	MF	RB Leipzig
2025	Konrad Laimer	AUT	28	MF	Bayern Munich

== Multiple winners ==
Players in bold are still active.

Wins	Player	Winning years	Club(s)
10	**David Alaba**	2011, 2012, 2013, 2014, 2015, 2016, 2020, 2021, 2022, 2023	Real Madrid; Bayern Munich; TSG Hoffenheim
4	Ivica Vastić	1995, 1998, 1999, 2007	Sturm Graz; LASK
3	Herbert Prohaska	1984, 1985, 1988	Austria Wien
2	Toni Polster	1986, 1997	Austria Wien; 1. FC Köln
2	Steffen Hofmann	2004, 2009	Rapid Wien

== See also ==
- Austrian Sportspersonality of the year
