= David Alaba =

Austrian footballer (born 1992)

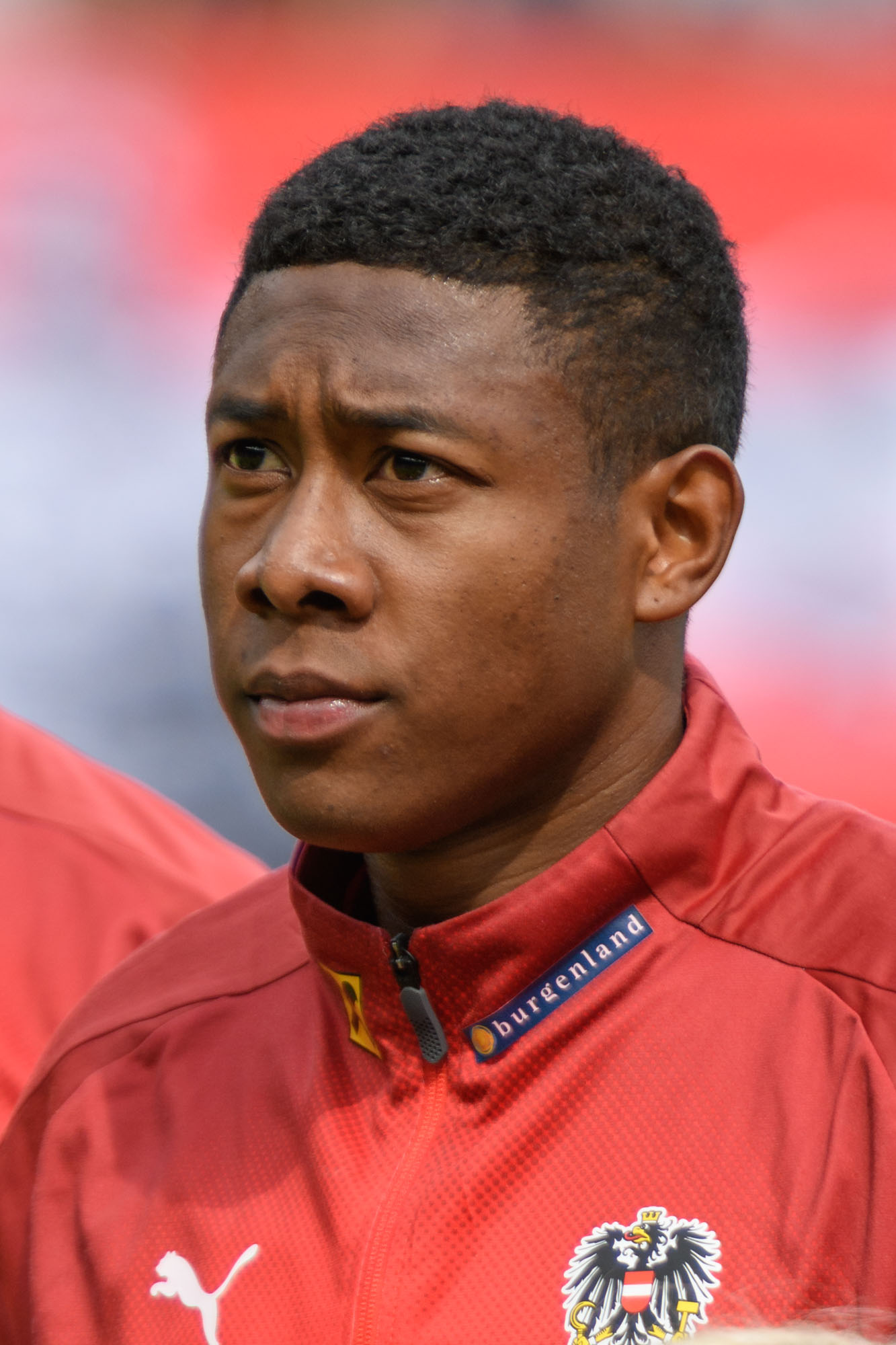
- Alaba with Austria in 2018

Personal information
- Full name: David Olatukunbo Alaba
- Date of birth: 24 June 1992 (age 34)
- Place of birth: Vienna, Austria
- Height: 1.80 m (5 ft 11 in)
- Positions: Centre-back; left-back

Team information
- Current team: Udinese
- Number: 5

Youth career
- 2001–2002: SV Aspern
- 2002–2008: Austria Wien
- 2008–2009: Bayern Munich

Senior career*
Years	Team	Apps	(Gls)
2007–2008	Austria Wien II	5	(0)
2009–2010	Bayern Munich II	33	(1)
2010–2021	Bayern Munich	281	(22)
2011	→ TSG Hoffenheim (loan)	17	(2)
2021–2026	Real Madrid	85	(3)
2026–	Udinese	3	(0)

International career^{‡}
2007–2009	Austria U17	20	(5)
2010	Austria U19	5	(1)
2009–2010	Austria U21	5	(0)
2009–	Austria	117	(15)
- * Club domestic league appearances and goals as of 23:38, 22 November 2026 (UTC) ‡ National team caps and goals as of 18:18, 3 July 2026 (UTC)

David Olatukunbo Alaba (Austrian German: [ˈdeɪvɪd ˈalaba, ˈdaːv-]; born 24 June 1992) is an Austrian professional footballer who plays as a centre-back for Serie A club Udinese and captains the Austria national team. He was previously deployed primarily as a left-back, and was considered one of the best in the world at this position.

Alaba started out in Bayern's youth system before being promoted to the reserve team for the 2009–10 season. In January 2011, Alaba joined TSG Hoffenheim on loan until the end of the 2010–11 season. He returned to Bayern at the start of the 2011–12 season, where he went on to become a regular member of the first-team squad. Alaba made over 400 appearances for Bayern Munich, winning 27 honours including ten Bundesliga titles and two UEFA Champions League titles in 2013 and 2020, both as part of trebles. During his time in Germany, he was named in the UEFA Team of the Year three times. In 2021, Alaba joined Real Madrid where he won the 2021–22 La Liga, Supercopa and Champions League title in his debut season. In 2024, he won La Liga and the Champions League again, becoming the only player in history to win the Champions League twice with different teams.

Alaba is Austria's second youngest player to play for their senior national team, debuting for them in 2009 as a 17-year-old. He has earned over 110 caps and represented his country at UEFA Euro 2016, Euro 2020 and the 2026 FIFA World Cup. Widely regarded as one of the best Austrian players of all time, he was voted Austrian Footballer of the Year on ten occasions (including six consecutive times from 2011 to 2016).

== Club career ==
=== Early career ===
Born in Vienna, Alaba began his career with SV Aspern, his local club in Aspern, in the Vienna district Donaustadt, before joining the youth setup of Austria Wien at age ten. He rose through the ranks quickly; in April 2008, he was named on the first-team substitutes' bench for an Austrian Bundesliga match. He also played five times for Austria Wien's reserve team, before leaving in summer 2008 to join German side Bayern Munich of the Bundesliga.

=== Bayern Munich ===
==== Youth, reserves and Hoffenheim loan ====
He started out in Bayern's youth system, playing for the under 17 and under 19 teams, before being promoted to the reserve team for the 2009–10 season. He made his debut in a 3. Liga match against Dynamo Dresden in August 2009 and scored his first professional goal for FC Bayern Munich II on 29 August 2009. He was named in Bayern Munich's squad for the 2009–10 UEFA Champions League, where he was assigned the shirt number 27. In January 2010, it was announced that Alaba would train with the first team for the rest of the 2009–10 season, along with reserve teammates Diego Contento and Mehmet Ekici.

The trio were named on the first-team substitutes' bench for the first time on 10 February 2010, for a DFB-Pokal game against SpVgg Greuther Fürth, and Alaba came on in the 59th minute, replacing Christian Lell. After one minute on the pitch, and with his second touch of the game, he set up Franck Ribéry to give Bayern a 3–2 lead, in a match they went on to win 6–2. He also became Bayern's youngest ever player in a competitive fixture, at 17 years, 7 months and 8 days old.

In January 2011, Alaba joined TSG Hoffenheim on loan until the end of the 2010–11 season. Later that month, he scored his first-ever goal in the Bundesliga in a 2–2 draw with FC St. Pauli.

==== 2011–2013 ====
Alaba returned to Bayern at the start of the 2011–12 season, where he became a regular member of the first-team squad. On 23 October 2011, Alaba scored his first league goal for Bayern in the 1–2 away loss against Hannover 96. On 20 December, Alaba was named Austrian Footballer of the Year for the first time. During the second half of the 2011–12 Bundesliga season, he established himself as a starter for Bayern. On 25 April 2012, he played in the 2011–12 UEFA Champions League semi-final second leg against Real Madrid, and scored Bayern's first kick of the shootout as they won 3–1 on penalties. However, due to being booked in the semi-final, Alaba was unable to play in the 2012 UEFA Champions League Final through suspension.

On 5 December, Alaba scored his first Champions League goal in a 4–1 win over BATE Borisov in the 2012–13 season. On 18 December, Alaba was named Austrian Footballer of the Year for the second year running. On 2 April 2013, Alaba scored the seventh-fastest goal (25.02 seconds) in Champions League history to set Bayern on their way to a 2–0 win over Juventus. On 25 May, he played the full 90 minutes at left-back as Bayern beat Borussia Dortmund 2–1 in the 2013 UEFA Champions League Final.

==== 2013–2015 ====
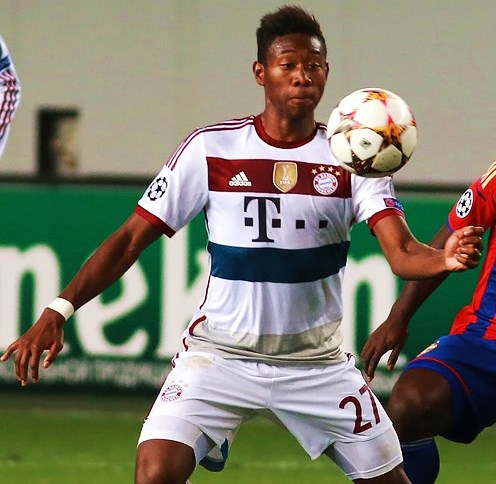
Alaba playing for Bayern Munich in 2014

During the 2013–14 season, he played in the 2013 DFL-Supercup against Borussia Dortmund, the UEFA Super Cup against Chelsea, and two matches in the FIFA Club World Cup; the first against Guangzhou Evergrande and the second against Raja Casablanca. On 2 December 2013, Alaba signed a new contract with Bayern Munich, which would expire in 2018. On 20 December, Alaba was named Austrian Footballer of the Year for the third year running. In January 2014, Alaba was named as the left-back in the UEFA Team of the Year 2013 for the first time.

On 18 December 2014, Alaba was named Austrian Footballer of the Year for the fourth year running. In January 2015, he was voted as the left-back in the UEFA.com Team of the Year 2014 by users (352,070 votes) for the second consecutive year. On 31 March, Alaba suffered a medial ligament damage in his left knee during Austria's 1–1 friendly draw with Bosnia and Herzegovina. Alaba missed the rest of the season for Bayern because of the injury.

==== 2015–2021 ====
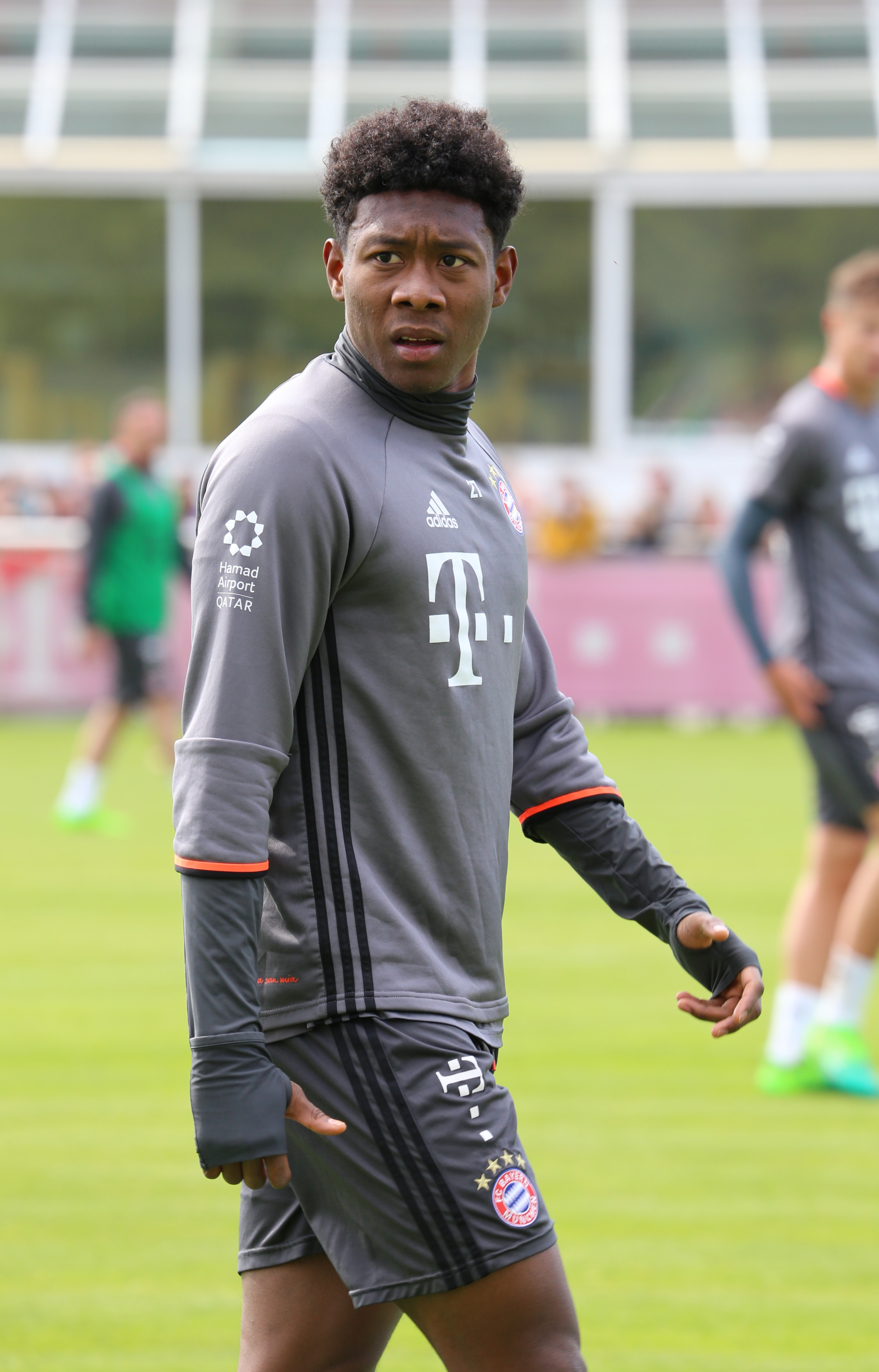
Alaba training with Bayern Munich in 2017

In August 2015 against his former club Hoffenheim, Alaba's misplaced pass resulted in Kevin Volland scoring in nine seconds, the quickest Bundesliga goal of all time. On 17 December, Alaba was named Austrian Footballer of the Year for the fifth consecutive year. On 8 January 2016, Alaba was voted as the left-back in the UEFA.com Team of the Year 2015 for the third consecutive year. On 18 March, he extended his contract until 2021. On 21 December, Alaba was named Austrian Footballer of the Year for the sixth year running. On 10 February 2018, Alaba made his 200th Bundesliga appearance in a 2–1 win over Schalke.

During the 2019–20 season, Alaba was converted to the centre-back position, often partnering up with Jérôme Boateng, due to an injury crisis. He adapted to the position very well and soon became the leader of the defence. On 23 August 2020, he played the full 90 minutes at centre-back as Bayern beat Paris Saint-Germain 1–0 in the 2020 UEFA Champions League Final. Bayern Munich went on to have their second treble-winning season after 2012–13, and thereby Alaba securing his second continental treble in his career.

After several attempts to extend his contract, Alaba mentioned that Bayern Munich asked him earlier whether he was interested in a swap deal with Leroy Sané from Manchester City, which he considered as a "slap in the face". On 16 February 2021, Alaba announced that he would leave Bayern Munich following the 2020–21 season after thirteen years with the club.

=== Real Madrid ===
On 28 May 2021, Spanish side Real Madrid announced they had signed Alaba on a five-year contract beginning on 1 July. He inherited the number 4 jersey, previously worn by the last captain Sergio Ramos over the past 16 seasons. He made his debut on 14 August, starting in a 4–1 win over Alavés. He scored his first goal on 24 October in a 2–1 win over Barcelona, his first El Clásico, becoming the second Austrian player to score in El Clasico history after Hans Krankl (1979). On 6 April 2022, Alaba made his 100th Champions League appearance in a 3–1 away win against Chelsea in the quarter-final of the competition.

On 10 August 2022, he got the opening goal in the 2022 UEFA Super Cup against Eintracht Frankfurt with Real Madrid going on to win 2–0. On 14 August 2022, he scored the winning goal for Real Madrid from a free kick in a 2–1 away victory against Almería.

During Real Madrid's La Liga match against Villarreal on 17 December 2023, Alaba suffered a torn anterior cruciate ligament in his left knee, requiring surgery and an extended recovery period, which lasted about 13 months. Alaba's return on the pitch happened on 19 January 2025 in a 4–1 win against Las Palmas.

On 22 May 2026, Alaba announced that he would leave Real Madrid at the end of the 2025–26 season, after five years at the club.

=== Udinese ===
On 24 September 2026, Alaba signed for Serie A club Udinese as a free agent on a contract until the end of the season.

== International career ==
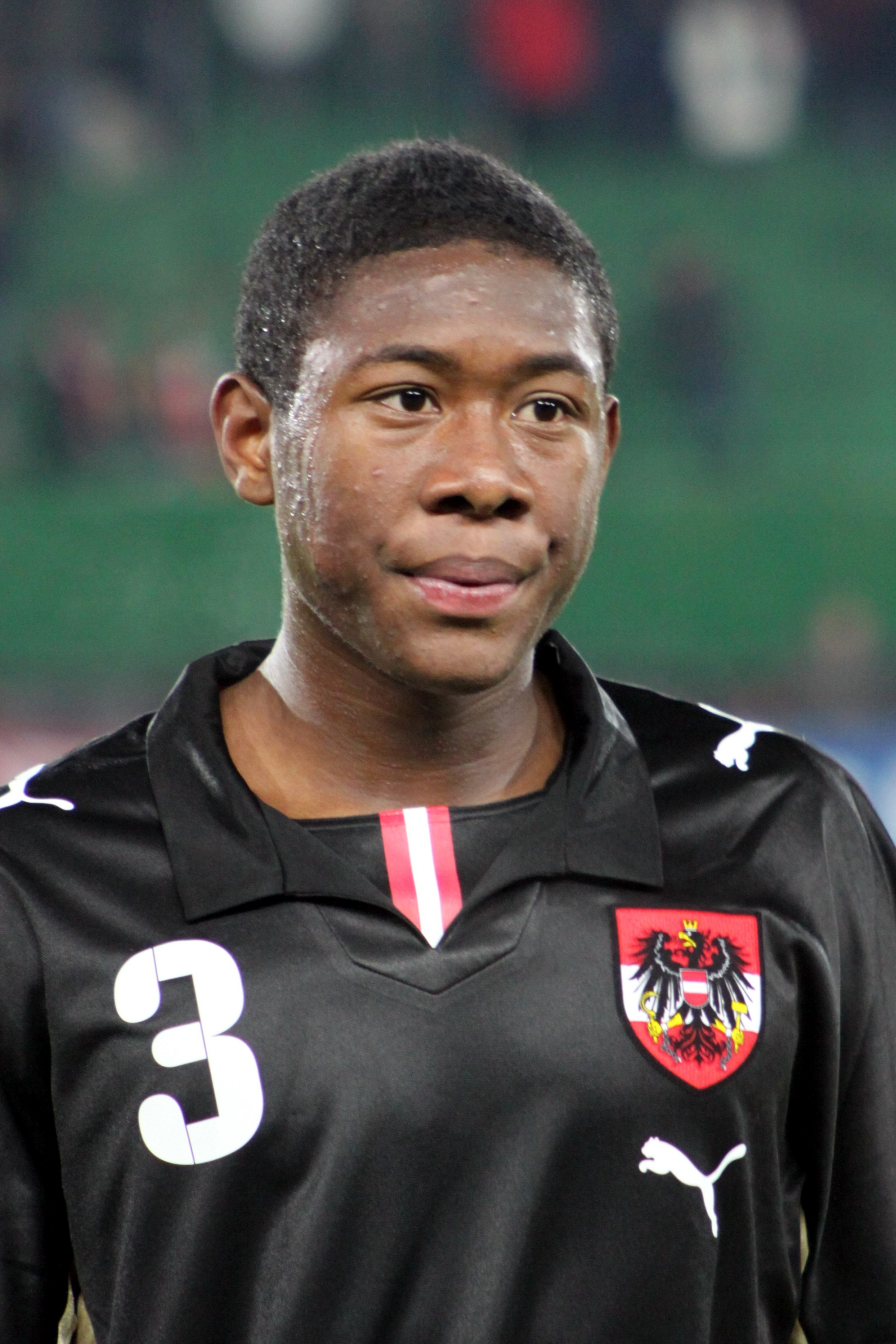
Alaba with Austria in 2009

Alaba played for Austria at under-17, under-19 and under-21 level. In October 2009, he was called up to the senior Austria national team for a match against France. He made his debut in this game, making him the youngest player in the history of the Austria national team. He scored his first goal for Austria on 16 October 2012 in a World Cup Qualifying game at home to Kazakhstan where Austria were 4–0 winners.

At the age of just 19, Alaba won the prestigious vote for Austrian Footballer of the Year in 2011. In the poll organised by APA (Austrian press agency) among the coaches of the ten Austrian Bundesliga clubs, Alaba finished top on 21 points, just ahead of Austria Wien's Dutch star Nacer Barazite (20 points) and VfB Stuttgart's Martin Harnik. In December 2012, he received the award for the second consecutive year. On 10 September 2013, Alaba scored the only goal of the game against Ireland in the 84-minute to give Austria a 1–0. He scored the final goal in Austria's 3–0 win in the final qualification match against Faroe Islands.

Alaba ended the 2014 FIFA World Cup qualification campaign as Austria's top scorer with six goals. He scored a ninth-minute Panenka-style penalty kick on 8 September 2015 to open a 4–1 away win over Sweden at the Friends Arena in Solna. The result qualified Austria for UEFA Euro 2016, their first successful qualification campaign for the continental championship. Alaba played in all three group matches as Austria finished last in their group with one point. On 24 March 2017, he captained Austria for the first time in a World Cup 2018 qualification game against Moldova in a 2–0 victory, deputizing in the absence of suspended captain Julian Baumgartlinger. Alaba played in eight matches as Austria failed to qualify for the 2018 FIFA World Cup. Alaba captained Austria during the UEFA Euro 2020, in which they reached the knockout stages in that competition for the first time in their history.

On 17 June 2023, Alaba played his 100th match for Austria in a 1–1 away draw against Belgium during the UEFA Euro 2024 qualifying. However, he was unable to feature in the UEFA Euro 2024 due to his long-term injury. Nonetheless, he was named as a "non-playing captain" for the team.

On 18 May 2026, Alaba was selected in Ralf Rangnick’s 26-man squad for the 2026 FIFA World Cup, marking Austria’s first appearance in the tournament since 1998.

== Style of play ==
A versatile defender, Alaba regularly plays as a left-back, and he has been deployed as a centre-back, central midfielder, and left midfielder. Although not known to have a fast pace, and his positioning has sometimes been questionable, Alaba possesses a powerful left foot; in which besides his defensive prowess, he is noted for his offensive capabilities and ability to read the game, where he has gained a reputation carrying the ball upfront in attacking plays and supplies his team with passes. Alaba has been noted for his talents being visible since a young age, and he has been singled out for his mentality, consistency, and leadership.

== Personal life ==
Alaba was born in Vienna to George and Gina Alaba and has one sister, a professional recording artist, named Rose May Alaba. His Yoruba Nigerian father is a prince from Ogere who is also a rapper and works as a DJ. His Visayan mother emigrated from the Philippines to work as a nurse. He is a member of the Seventh-day Adventist Church.

Alaba understands and speaks the Bosnian language, as most of his childhood friends in Vienna were Bosnian.

== Outside football ==
Alaba was chosen to be on the cover of FIFA 15 and FIFA 16 in Austria next to Lionel Messi.

== Career statistics ==
=== Club ===
As of match played 22 November 2026

Appearances and goals by club, season and competition
Club	Season	League			National cup (Note: Includes DFB-Pokal, Copa del Rey)		Europe		Other		Total	
Club	Season	Division	Apps	Goals	Apps	Goals	Apps	Goals	Apps	Goals	Apps	Goals
Bayern Munich II	2009–10	3. Liga	23	1	—		—		—		23	1
Bayern Munich II	2010–11	3. Liga	10	0	—		—		—		10	0
Bayern Munich II	Total		33	1	—		—		—		33	1
Bayern Munich	2009–10	Bundesliga	3	0	1	0	2 (Note: Appearances in UEFA Champions League)	0	—		6	0
Bayern Munich	2010–11	Bundesliga	2	0	1	0	0	0	0	0	3	0
Bayern Munich	2011–12	Bundesliga	30	2	6	1	11	0	—		47	3
Bayern Munich	2012–13	Bundesliga	23	3	4	0	11	2	0	0	38	5
Bayern Munich	2013–14	Bundesliga	28	2	5	0	12	2	4 (Note: One appearance in DFL-Supercup, one appearance in UEFA Super Cup, two appearances in FIFA Club World Cup)	0	49	4
Bayern Munich	2014–15	Bundesliga	19	2	3	3	6	0	1 (Note: Appearance in DFL-Supercup)	0	29	5
Bayern Munich	2015–16	Bundesliga	30	1	5	0	10	1	1	0	46	2
Bayern Munich	2016–17	Bundesliga	32	4	5	1	9	0	1	0	47	5
Bayern Munich	2017–18	Bundesliga	23	2	6	0	7	0	0	0	36	2
Bayern Munich	2018–19	Bundesliga	31	3	4	0	7	0	1	0	43	3
Bayern Munich	2019–20	Bundesliga	28	1	5	1	8	0	1	0	42	2
Bayern Munich	2020–21	Bundesliga	33	2	1	0	8	0	3 (Note: One appearance in UEFA Super Cup, two appearances in FIFA Club World Cup)	0	45	2
Bayern Munich	Total		281	22	46	6	92	5	12	0	431	33
TSG Hoffenheim (loan)	2010–11	Bundesliga	17	2	1	0	—		—		18	2
Real Madrid	2021–22	La Liga	30	2	3	0	12	1	1 (Note: Appearance in Supercopa de España)	0	46	3
Real Madrid	2022–23	La Liga	23	1	2	0	11	0	3 (Note: One appearance and one goal in UEFA Super Cup, two appearances in FIFA Club World Cup)	1	39	2
Real Madrid	2023–24	La Liga	14	0	0	0	3	0	0	0	17	0
Real Madrid	2024–25	La Liga	7	0	2	0	5	0	0	0	14	0
Real Madrid	2025–26	La Liga	11	0	1	0	3	0	1	0	16	0
Real Madrid	Total		85	3	8	0	34	2	5	0	132	5
Udinese	2026–27	Serie A	3	0	0	0	—		—		3	0
Career total			419	28	56	7	126	6	17	1	617	41

=== International ===
As of match played 2 July 2026

Appearances and goals by national team and year
National team	Year	Apps	Goals
Austria	2009	2	0
Austria	2010	3	0
Austria	2011	11	0
Austria	2012	5	1
Austria	2013	10	5
Austria	2014	4	2
Austria	2015	7	3
Austria	2016	12	0
Austria	2017	5	0
Austria	2018	8	2
Austria	2019	5	1
Austria	2020	4	0
Austria	2021	15	0
Austria	2022	7	1
Austria	2023	7	0
Austria	2024	0	0
Austria	2025	6	0
Austria	2026	6	0
Total		117	15

Scores and results list Austria's goal tally first, score column indicates score after each Alaba goal

List of international goals scored by David Alaba
No.	Date	Venue	Opponent	Score	Result	Competition
1	16 October 2012	Ernst-Happel-Stadion, Vienna, Austria	Kazakhstan	3–0	4–0	2014 FIFA World Cup qualification
2	22 March 2013	Ernst-Happel-Stadion, Vienna, Austria	Faroe Islands	5–0	6–0	2014 FIFA World Cup qualification
3	26 March 2013	Aviva Stadium, Dublin, Ireland	Republic of Ireland	2–2	2–2	2014 FIFA World Cup qualification
4	7 June 2013	Ernst-Happel-Stadion, Vienna, Austria	Sweden	1–0	2–1	2014 FIFA World Cup qualification
5	10 September 2013	Ernst-Happel-Stadion, Vienna, Austria	Republic of Ireland	1–0	1–0	2014 FIFA World Cup qualification
6	15 October 2013	Tórsvøllur, Tórshavn, Faroe Islands	Faroe Islands	3–0	3–0	2014 FIFA World Cup qualification
7	8 September 2014	Ernst-Happel-Stadion, Vienna, Austria	Sweden	1–0	1–1	UEFA Euro 2016 qualification
8	9 October 2014	Zimbru Stadium, Chișinău, Moldova	Moldova	1–0	2–1	UEFA Euro 2016 qualification
9	27 March 2015	Rheinpark Stadion, Vaduz, Liechtenstein	Liechtenstein	3–0	5–0	UEFA Euro 2016 qualification
10	8 September 2015	Friends Arena, Solna, Sweden	Sweden	1–0	4–1	UEFA Euro 2016 qualification
11	17 November 2015	Ernst-Happel-Stadion, Vienna, Austria	Switzerland	1–1	1–2	Friendly
12	23 March 2018	Wörthersee Stadion, Klagenfurt, Austria	Slovenia	1–0	3–0	Friendly
13	6 September 2018	Generali Arena, Vienna, Austria	Sweden	2–0	2–0	Friendly
14	16 November 2019	Ernst-Happel-Stadion, Vienna, Austria	North Macedonia	1–0	2–1	UEFA Euro 2020 qualification
15	20 November 2022	Ernst-Happel-Stadion, Vienna, Austria	Italy	2–0	2–0	Friendly

== Honours ==
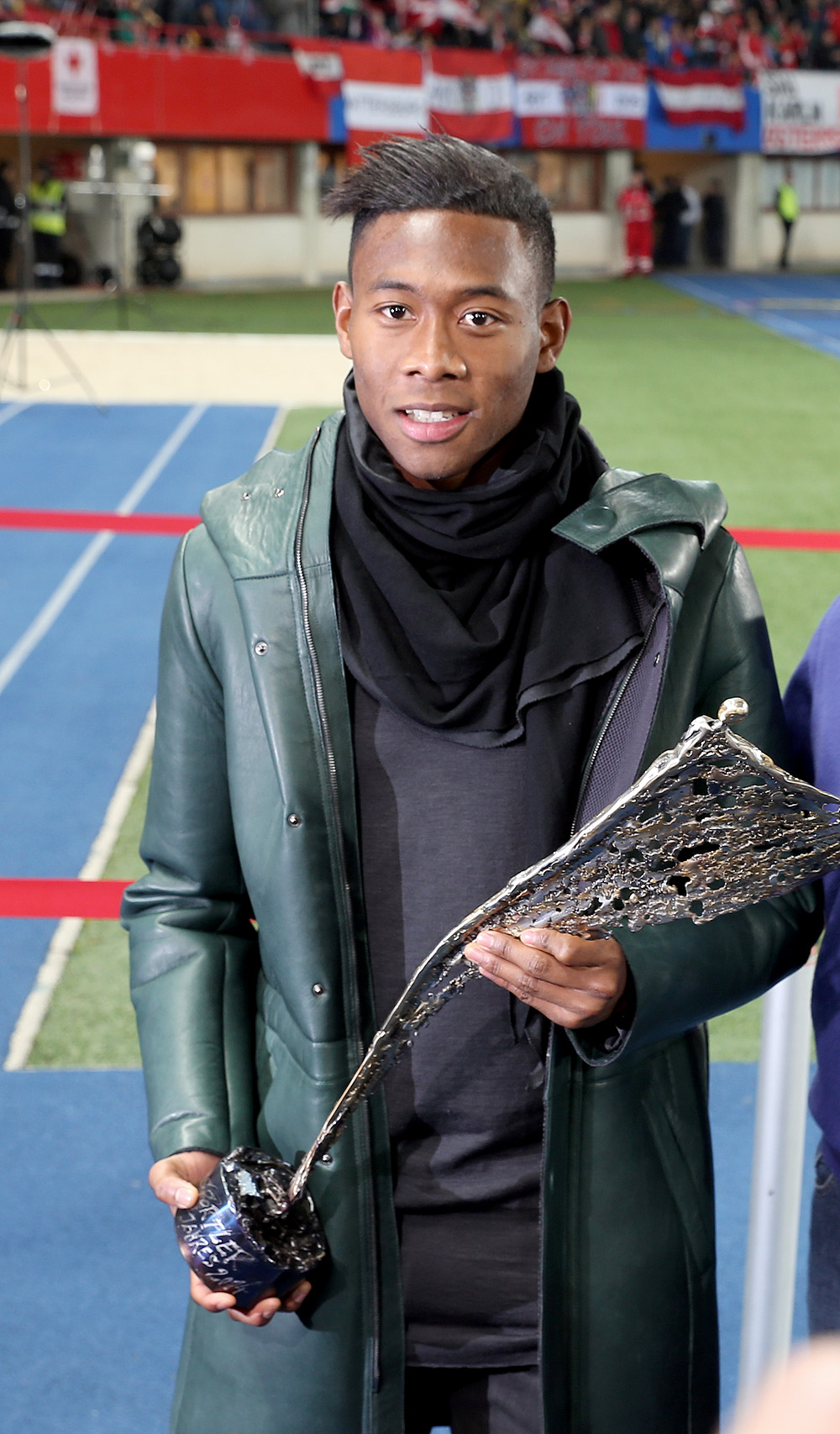
Alaba with the Austrian Sports Personality of the Year award in 2014

Bayern Munich

- Bundesliga: 2009–10, 2012–13, 2013–14, 2014–15, 2015–16, 2016–17, 2017–18, 2018–19, 2019–20, 2020–21
- DFB-Pokal: 2009–10, 2012–13, 2013–14, 2015–16, 2018–19, 2019–20
- DFL-Supercup: 2016, 2018, 2020
- UEFA Champions League: 2012–13, 2019–20
- UEFA Super Cup: 2013, 2020
- FIFA Club World Cup: 2013, 2020

Real Madrid

- La Liga: 2021–22, 2023–24
- Copa del Rey: 2022–23
- Supercopa de España: 2022, 2024
- UEFA Champions League: 2021–22, 2023–24
- UEFA Super Cup: 2022, 2024
- FIFA Club World Cup: 2022
- FIFA Intercontinental Cup: 2024

Individual

- Austrian Footballer of the Year: 2011, 2012, 2013, 2014, 2015, 2016, 2020, 2021, 2022, 2023
- Austrian Sports Personality of the Year: 2013, 2014
- FIFA FIFPro World11: 2021
- UEFA Team of the Year: 2013, 2014, 2015
- UEFA Champions League Team of the Group stage: 2015–16
- UEFA Champions League Squad of the Season: 2019–20, 2020–21
- ESM Team of the Year: 2013–14
- France Football World XI: 2015
- Bundesliga Team of the Season: 2014–15, 2015–16
- ESPN FC Best Left-Back 2016
- La Liga Team of the Season: 2021–22

== See also ==
- List of footballers with 100 or more UEFA Champions League appearances
