= 2009–10 FC Bayern Munich season =

110th season in existence of Bayern Munich

Bayern Munich
2009–10 season
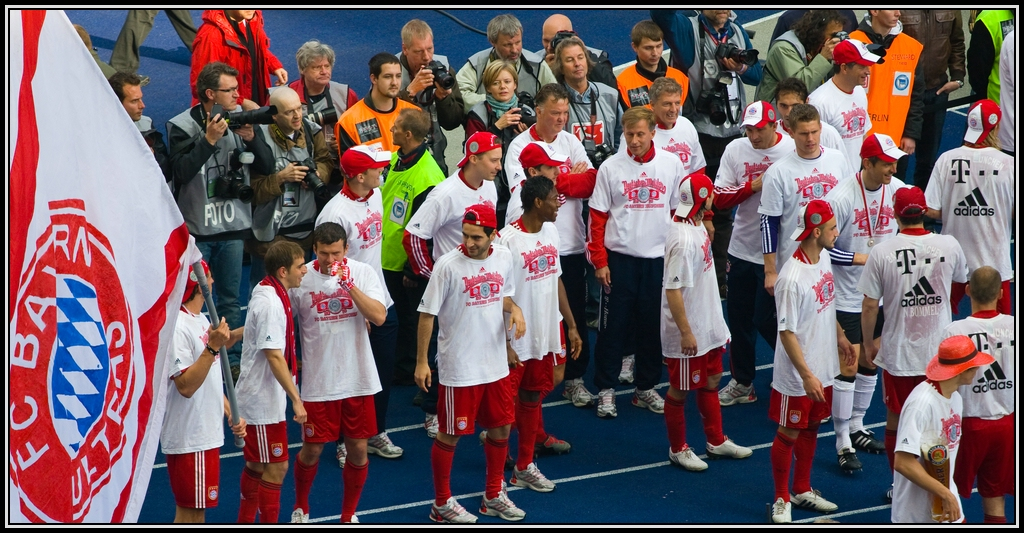
- Van Gaal (center, arms folded) and Bayern players celebrating their double-winning season
- Chairman: Uli Hoeneß
- Manager: Louis van Gaal
- Stadium: Allianz Arena
- Bundesliga: 1st
- DFB-Pokal: Winners
- UEFA Champions League: Runners-up
- Top goalscorer: League: Arjen Robben (16); All: Arjen Robben (23)
- Highest home attendance: 69,000
- Lowest home attendance: 69,000
Home colours	Away colours	Third colours

The 2009–10 season of Bayern Munich began on 1 July with their first training session, led by the team's new head coach Louis van Gaal. After several friendlies the first competitive game was a cup game on 1 August. The league started on 8 August.

Bayern made several squad changes, signing Alexander Baumjohann, Edson Braafheid, Mario Gómez, Ivica Olić, Danijel Pranjić and Anatoliy Tymoshchuk. Andreas Görlitz returned to Munich after a two-year loan spell at Karlsruher SC, while Bayern declined the option to buy Massimo Oddo, who returned from loan to Milan. Tim Borowski was sold to his former club, Werder Bremen, and Lúcio left the club for Inter Milan. Zé Roberto signed at Hamburger SV after his contract with Bayern was not renewed. Just before the end of the summer transfer period, Bayern acquired Arjen Robben from Real Madrid.

In the winter transfer period, Bayern loaned both Breno and Andreas Ottl to 1. FC Nürnberg in the hopes of the duo earning first-team experience. After some quarrels with coach Van Gaal, Luca Toni moved to Roma, also on loan. Alexander Baumjohann was signed by his first club, Schalke, and Bayern loaned Edson Braafheid to Celtic in a last minute deal before the end of the winter transfer period. The Reds did not buy any new players themselves, but gave professional contracts to Diego Contento and Mehmet Ekici from Bayern II.

Bayern helped ensure they won the championship on 1 May, by winning on the penultimate gameday of the Bundesliga. In the last game, their rivals Schalke 04, who were at the time in second place, would have had to overcome a three-point and 17-goal lead to supplant the Reds. Bayern was formally awarded the trophy after the final game of the season on 8 May. A week later they also won the cup, defeating Werder Bremen 4–0 in the final. In the final game of the season, Bayern lost the Champions League final to Inter Milan 0–2.

== Course of the season ==
=== Pre-season ===
After the sacking of coach Jürgen Klinsmann late in the previous season, Jupp Heynckes had taken over as caretaker coach until the end of the season. It was thus that Bayern had to find a replacement in the summer break. Their choice fell on the Dutch Louis van Gaal, who had just led AZ Alkmaar to a championship in his home country. The signing of Van Gaal was in stark contrast to the signing of Klinsmann before the previous season, as Klinsmann came with absolutely no experience at club level while Van Gaal had been working as a coach in club football for almost 20 years. His quality as a coach was further underlined by the titles he had already won.

Before Van Gaal's arrival, the club had already signed Mario Gómez for a Bundesliga record sum of €35 million, as well as Anatoliy Tymoshchuk, Ivica Olić and Alexander Baumjohann. Finally, Andreas Görlitz returned on loan from Karlsruher SC. Van Gaal then encouraged the recruitment of Danijel Pranjić and Edson Braafheid. On the outgoing side, the loanee Massimo Oddo returned to Milan, Tim Borowski was sold to his former club Werder Bremen, Lúcio left for Inter Milan after many successful years with the Reds, and Zé Roberto signed with Hamburger SV when he could not agree with Bayern on a new contract.

The pre-season began with a score of friendlies which had been arranged still under the reign of Klinsmann. While Van Gaal was not happy with the packed schedule, as he preferred to work with the team, Bayern played a mostly successful preseason, including several high wins against opponents from lower tiers. They also managed to win in their own Audi Cup for which they had invited international premier clubs Milan, Manchester United, and Boca Juniors. Van Gaal waited until after the last friendly to decide on two key roles in his team. In the previous season, Klinsmann had first chosen Michael Rensing as keeper of choice, but in the second half of the season, he switched to Hans-Jörg Butt after a string of unsatisfactory games. The other important issue was that of the team captain and his replacements. On the day prior to the first competitive game of the season, the cup match at Neckarelz, the coach announced his decisions. Mark van Bommel stayed captain and Philipp Lahm became his first replacement. Van Gaal had also announced that the keeper he elected for the Neckarelz game would be his keeper of choice for the season, and in the cup game, it was Rensing who had the starting position as goalkeeper.

=== August– December ===
In their first game, Bayern did not shine, but put away the underdogs from Neckarelz 3–1. The first games in the league were draws against 1899 Hoffenheim and Werder Bremen, before Bayern lost their first game to newly promoted Mainz 05. Just before the next Bundesliga match, Bayern announced that they had signed Arjen Robben in a last minute transfer from Real Madrid. In his first game, against VfL Wolfsburg a day later, Robben scored twice, but after a string of victories, including a 3–0 victory away at Maccabi Haifa in the starter of the Champions League, Bayern began to struggle. A loss at Hamburger SV and a draw at home against 1. FC Köln saw the Reds to the eighth place in the league, marking the worst start in decades, and the media already speculated about an even quicker sacking of Van Gaal than that of Klinsmann the previous season.

Although the draw at Köln would eventually be the start of a series of 19 undefeated games in the league, Bayern won only two of their next five league games, drawing the other three. Meanwhile, they lost twice to Bordeaux in the Champions League. This led to a configuration where Bayern could not make it to the knockout phase without the help of Bordeaux. As Bordeaux already secured qualification to the knockout phase, many expected that they would not put all their effort into their next match against Juventus, and a win of the Italians would mean the end of Bayern's Champions League campaign this season.

The Reds won their last four league matches before the winter break, and also managed to win at Haifa while Bordeaux indeed defeated Juventus, meaning that Bayern and Juventus decided who qualified for the next round face to face in the final match of the group stage. The Germans needed to win, while the Italians would be through with a draw. When David Trezeguet put Juventus in front in the 19th minute, prospects looked bleak for Bayern, but they managed to turn the game around and eventually won 4–1.

=== January – May ===
After the winter break, Bayern won game after game. Five in the league completed a streak of nine consecutive victories while Fiorentina was put away 2–1 in the first leg of the Champions League round of 16, and second-tier SpVgg Greuther Fürth was run over 6–2 in the cup.

On 20 February 1. FC Nürnberg managed a draw against Bayern, thus ending their streak of victories, but on the following day of play a victory of the Reds at Hamburg saw them to the top of the standings for the first time in more than 18 months. A draw at Cologne and a victory against SC Freiburg completed Bayern's streak of 19 undefeated games in the league. On 9 March at Fiorentina, the club also reached the next round of the Champions League although their first loss after the winter break, 3–2, meant that they advanced only on the away goals rule.

Despite a loss at Eintracht Frankfurt on 20 March, Bayern stayed in first place, but that was of minor importance as the deciding weeks were yet to come. Within three weeks Bayern was to play in the semi-final of the cup against Schalke 04, in the league against their direct rivals, Schalke and Leverkusen, and the best team in the second leg of the league, VfB Stuttgart. In the Champions League the club faced Manchester. Bayern won the first of the matches at Schalke, the cup semi-final, in a close game after extra time. Three days later a loss at home against Stuttgart set the Reds back into second place in the league. Yet another three days later Bayern won the first leg of their quarter-final encounter with Manchester United. For the next game the club returned to Schalke where they won again, thus reclaiming their lead in the league. In the second leg the quarter-final at Manchester Bayern was down by two early, but managed to get back into the game. Eventually they won by the same score as in the previous round, 2–1 and 2–3, to advance to the semi-final. The final game of these weeks was their away game at Leverkusen where the Reds were able to claim a draw.

Next Hannover 96 was stomped 7–0, but otherwise the Reds did not have time to take breath. The first game of their semi-final against Lyon was a heated affair with red cards on both sides, but Bayern emerged victorious. Before going to Lyon for the second leg, Bayern had to face their classic rival, Mönchengladbach, in the league. A 1–1 let Bayern stay ahead of Schalke. Then the game at Lyon was all Ivica Olić's. The Croat put three past Lyon and Bayern advanced to their first Champions League final since their triumph in 2001.

With only four games left Bayern could still win the Treble, but they had not claimed a single title yet. On 1 May, Bayern defeated VfL Bochum in the league, thus putting the title out of Schalke's reach. Officially Bayern were not champions yet, but even if Schalke won on the last day while Bayern lost they would still have to do that by a result that was by 17 goals better than Bayern's. Unsurprisingly, the title went to Munich as Bayern won their last game whereas Schalke didn't. A week later Bayern faced another of their continuous rivals, Werder Bremen, in the cup final. The result was one of the most lopsided in the history of German cup finals as the Reds won 4–0. Only the most prestigious title was elusive as Bayern could not overcome Inter in the final of the Champions League.

=== Post-season ===
Bayern had no post-season friendlies this year, but eleven players where internationals of teams that had qualified for the 2010 FIFA World Cup. Franck Ribéry joined the French World Cup squad, Martín Demichelis the Argentinian. Arjen Robben and Mark van Bommel were part of the Dutch squad and seven players, Butt, Lahm, Badstuber, Schweinsteiger, Klose, Müller, and Gómez, were called up for Germany. Butt replaced Adler who missed due to injury. Lahm became captain of the team as Ballack also missed the tournament due to injury.

== Annual General Meeting ==
On 30 November 2010, Bayern Munich reported to their members regarding the period between 1 July 2009 and 30 June 2010. There was a unanimous approval of a series of detailed amendments to the club's constitution. Any sale of shares in FC Bayern München AG taking the total in outside hands to more than 30% of the stock will now require the approval of a 75% majority at the AGM. Bayern Munich considered their 2009–10 season a success on the field. Bayern Munich made a profit for the 18th year in a row. There were no elections to club offices this year. 2,807 club members attended the Annual General Meeting at Olympiahalle in Munich.

2009–10 Financial Results		Comment
Revenue	€312 Million	An increase of almost 16% from the previous season. €300 million turnover barrier for the first time.
Equity capital	€206.4 million (65.1%)	
Net profit	€2.9 million	
EBITDA	€61.2 million	Profit after tax rose 20%.

== Bundesliga ==
=== Matches ===
Match	Date	Ground	Opponent	Score^{1}	Pos.	Pts.	GD	Report
1	8 August	A	1899 Hoffenheim	1 – 1	10	1	0	Report / Report link; Kick off / 18:30 CEST; Attendance / 30,150 (sell-out); Referee / Babak Rafati (Hanover); 1899 Hoffenheim / Bayern Munich; Obasi 41' / Olić 25'; Van Bommel (yellow card) 76'; Müller (yellow card) 90'
2	15 August	H	Werder Bremen	1 – 1	11	2	0	Report / Report link; Kick off / 15:30 CEST; Attendance / 69,000 (sell-out); Referee / Manuel Gräfe (Berlin); Bayern Munich / Werder Bremen; Schweinsteiger (yellow card) 38'; Gómez 72' / Özil 39'; Fritz (yellow card)
3	22 August	A	Mainz 05	1 – 2	14	2	-1	Report / Report link; Kick off / 15:30 CEST; Attendance / 20,300 (sell-out); Referee / Thorsten Kinhöfer (Herne); Mainz 05 / Bayern Munich; Ivanschitz 25'; Bancé 37' / Noveski 47' (o.g.)
4	29 August	H	VfL Wolfsburg	3 – 0	8	5	2	Report / Report link; Kick off / 18:30 CEST; Attendance / 69,000 (sell-out); Referee / Michael Kempter (Sauldorf); Bayern Munich / VfL Wolfsburg; Gómez 28'; Robben 68', 80'
5	12 September	A	Borussia Dortmund	5 – 1	5	8	6	Report / Report link; Kick off / 15:30 CEST; Attendance / 80,552 (sell-out); Referee / Knut Kircher (Rottenburg); Borussia Dortmund / Bayern Munich; Hummels 10' / Gómez 36'; Schweinsteiger 49'; Ribéry 65'; Müller 78', 88'
6	19 September	H	1. FC Nürnberg	2 – 1	3	11	7	Report / Report link; Kick off / 15:30 CEST; Attendance / 69,000 (sell-out); Referee / Florian Meyer (Burgdorf); Bayern Munich / 1. FC Nürnberg; Olić 55'; Van Buyten 82' / Choupo-Moting 73'
7	26 September	A	Hamburger SV	0 – 1	7	11	6	Report / Report link; Kick off / 18:30 CEST; Attendance / 57,000 (sell-out); Referee / Michael Weiner (Giesen); Hamburger SV / Bayern Munich; Zé Roberto (yellow card) 41'; Aogo (yellow card) 69'; Petrić 72' / Ribéry (yellow card) 40'; Tymoshchuk (yellow card) 59'; Schweinsteiger (yellow card) 78'
8	3 October	H	1. FC Köln	0 – 0	8	12	6	Report / Report link; Kick off / 15:30 CEST; Attendance / 69,000 (sell-out); Referee / Lutz Wagner (Kriftel); Bayern Munich / 1. FC Köln; Braafheld (yellow card) 31' / Freis (yellow card) 79'; Geromel (yellow card) 84'; Brečko (yellow card) 85'; Matip (yellow card) 88'
9	17 October	A	SC Freiburg	2 – 1	6	15	7	Report / Report link; Kick off / 15:30 CEST; Attendance / 24,000 (sell-out); Referee / Manuel Gräfe (Berlin); SC Freiburg / Bayern Munich; Reisinger 90+2' / Müller 42'; Cha 68' (o.g.)
10	24 October	H	Eintracht Frankfurt	2 – 1	5	18	8	Report / Report link; Kick off / 15:30 CEST; Attendance / 69,000 (sell-out); Referee / Jochen Drees (Münster-Sarmsheim); Bayern Munich / Eintracht Frankfurt; Robben 69'; Van Buyten 88' / Meier 60'
11	31 October	A	VfB Stuttgart	0 – 0	6	19	8	Report / Report link; Kick off / 15:30 CET; Attendance / 42,000 (sell-out); Referee / Michael Kempter (Sauldorf); VfB Stuttgart / Bayern Munich; Delpierre (yellow card) 35'; Kuzmanović (yellow card) 47'; Gebhart (yellow card) 89' / Van Bommel (yellow card) 19'; Toni (yellow card) 76'
12	7 November	H	Schalke 04	1 – 1	8	20	8	Report / Report link; Kick off / 15:30 CET; Attendance / 69,000 (sell-out); Referee / Florian Meyer (Burgdorf); Bayern Munich / Schalke 04; Van Buyten 31'; Robben (yellow card) 56'; Schweinsteiger (yellow card) 63' / Sánchez (yellow card) 30'; Kurányi (yellow card) 34'; Matip 43'; Schmitz (yellow card) 56'; Zambrano (yellow card) 79'
13	22 November	H	Bayer Leverkusen	1 – 1	7	21	8	Report / Report link; Kick off / 15:30 CET; Attendance / 69,000 (sell-out); Referee / Knut Kircher (Rottenburg); Bayern Munich / Bayer Leverkusen; Gómez 8'; Van Bommel (yellow card) 87' / Kießling 14'
14	29 November	A	Hannover 96	3 – 0	4	24	11	Report / Report link; Kick off / 17:30 CET; Attendance / 49,000 (sell-out); Referee / Thorsten Kinhöfer (Herne); Hannover 96 / Bayern Munich; / Müller 19'; Olić 47'; Gómez 90'
15	4 December	H	Borussia Mönchengladbach	2 – 1	4	27	12	Report / Report link; Kick off / 20:30 CET; Attendance / 69,000 (sell-out); Referee / Michael Weiner (Giesen); Bayern Munich / Borussia Mönchengladbach; Gómez 19' (yellow card) 88'; Badstuber 75'; Van Bommel (yellow card) 81'; Tymoshchuk (yellow card) 82' / Brouwers 28'; Bradley (yellow card) 53'; Levels (yellow card) 87'
16	12 December	A	VfL Bochum	5 – 1	3	30	16	Report / Report link; Kick off / 15:30 CET; Attendance / 30,748 (sell-out); Referee / Florian Meyer (Burgdorf); VfL Bochum / Bayern Munich; Azaouagh (yellow card) 45'; Fuchs 76'; Pfertzel (yellow card) / Gómez 23'; Mavraj 33' (o.g.); Olicć 43', 50'; Pranjić 56'; Van Bommel (yellow card) 77'
17	19 December	H	Hertha BSC	5 – 2	3	33	19	Report / Report link; Kick off / 15:30 CET; Attendance / 69,000 (sell-out); Referee / Marco Fritz (Korb); Bayern Munich / Hertha BSC; Van Buyten 16'; Gómez 31'; Robben 33'; Müller 60'; Olić 77' / Cícero (yellow card) 63'; Ramos 71'; Raffael 90'
18	15 January	H	1899 Hoffenheim	2 – 0	3	36	21	Report / Report link; Kick off / 20:30 CET; Attendance / 69,000 (sell-out); Referee / Thorsten Kinhöfer (Herne); Bayern Munich / 1899 Hoffenheim; Demichelis 35'; Klose 86' / Vukčević (yellow card) 43'; Salihović (yellow card) 60'; Šimunić (yellow card) 81'
19	23 January	A	Werder Bremen	3 – 2	2	39	22	Report / Report link; Kick off / 15:30 CET; Attendance / 39,100 (sell-out); Referee / Knut Kircher (Rottenburg); Werder Bremen / Bayern Munich; Hunt 10'; Wiese (yellow card) 43'; Almeida 75' / Müller 25'; Olić 35'; Van Bommel (yellow card) 40'; Robben 78'; Demichelis (yellow card) 84'
20	30 January	H	Mainz 05	3 – 0	2	42	25	Report / Report link; Kick off / 15:30 CET; Attendance / 69,000 (sell-out); Referee / Babak Rafati (Hannover); Bayern Munich / Mainz 05; Van Buyten 58'; Gómez 75'; Demichelis (yellow card) 79'; Robben 86' / Ivanschitz (yellow card) 48'
21	6 February	A	VfL Wolfsburg	3 – 1	2	45	27	Report / Report link; Kick off / 15:30 CET; Attendance / 30,000 (sell-out); Referee / Manuel Gräfe (Berlin); VfL Wolfsburg / Bayern Munich; Hasebe (yellow card) 8'; Grafite 90' / Robben 2'; Olić (yellow card) 10'; Van Buyten 26'; Demichelis (yellow card) 54'; Ribéry 57'
22	13 February	H	Borussia Dortmund	3 – 1	2	48	29	Report / Report link; Kick off / 18:30 CET; Attendance / 69,000 (sell-out); Referee / Knut Kircher (Rottenburg); Bayern Munich / Borussia Dortmund; Van Bommel 21'; Robben 50'; Gómez 65' / Zidan 5'
23	20 February	A	1. FC Nürnberg	1 – 1	2	49	29	Report / Report link; Kick off / 15:30 CET; Attendance / 48,548 (sell-out); Referee / Thorsten Kinhöfer (Herne); 1. FC Nürnberg / Bayern Munich; Gündoğan 54'; Bunjaku (yellow card) 61'; Eigler (yellow card) 90' / Müller 38'; Altıntop (yellow card) 89'
24	28 February	H	Hamburger SV	1 – 0	1	52	30	Report / Report link; Kick off / 17:30 CET; Attendance / 69,000 (sell-out); Referee / Lutz Wagner (Kriftel); Bayern Munich / Hamburger SV; Van Bommel (yellow card) 32'; Ribéry 78'; Schweinsteiger (yellow card) 87' / Boateng (yellow card) 35'; Demel (yellow card) 89'
25	6 March	A	1. FC Köln	1 – 1	1	53	30	Report / Report link; Kick off / 15:30 CET; Attendance / 50,000 (sell-out); Referee / Babak Rafati (Hannover); 1. FC Köln / Bayern Munich; Podolski 32'; Maniche (yellow card) 66'; Petit (yellow card) 84' / Schweinsteiger 58', (yellow card) 90'; Van Buyten (yellow card) 72'
26	13 March	H	SC Freiburg	2 – 1	1	56	31	Report / Report link; Kick off / 18:30 CET; Attendance / 69,000 (sell-out); Referee / Markus Schmidt (Stuttgart); Bayern Munich / SC Freiburg; Pranjić (yellow card) 11'; Müller (yellow card) 20'; Lahm (yellow card) 68'; Robben 76', 83' (pen.) / Abdessadki (yellow card) 7'; Makiadi 31'; Banović (yellow card) 83'; Idrissou (yellow card) 88'; Toprak (yellow card) 90'
27	20 March	A	Eintracht Frankfurt	1 – 2	1	56	30	Report / Report link; Kick off / 15:30 CET; Attendance / 51,500 (sell-out); Referee / Michael Weiner (Giesen); Eintracht Frankfurt / Bayern Munich; Tsoumou 87'; Fenin 89' / Klose 7', (yellow card) 56'; Badstuber (yellow card) 59'
28	27 March	H	VfB Stuttgart	1 – 2	2	56	29	Report / Report link; Kick off / 15:30 CET; Attendance / 69,000 (sell-out); Referee / Florian Meyer (Burgdorf); Bayern Munich / VfB Stuttgart; Olić 32'; Van Bommel (yellow card) 74' / Träsch 41'; Cacau (yellow card) 43'; Marica 50'
29	3 April	A	Schalke 04	2 – 1	1	59	30	Report / Report link; Kick off / 15:30 CEST; Attendance / 61,673 (sell-out); Referee / Manuel Gräfe (Berlin); Schalke 04 / Bayern Munich; Bordon (yellow card) 24' (red card) 90'; Kurányi 31', (yellow card) 90'; Rafinha (yellow card) 67' / Ribéry 25'; Müller 26'; Altıntop (yellow card) 35' (red card) 41'; Demichelis (yellow card) 45'; Butt (yellow card) 90'
30	10 April	A	Bayer Leverkusen	1 – 1	1	60	30	Report / Report link; Kick off / 18:30 CEST; Attendance / 30,210 (sell-out); Referee / Knut Kircher (Rottenburg); Bayer Leverkusen / Bayern Munich; Vidal (yellow card) 30' (goal) 59' / Badstuber (yellow card) 31'; Robben 51' (pen.); Müller (yellow card) 76'; Van Bommel (yellow card) 79'; Schweinsteiger (yellow card) 84'
31	17 April	H	Hannover 96	7 – 0	1	63	37	Report / Report link; Kick off / 18:30 CEST; Attendance / 69,000 (sell-out); Referee / Markus Wingenbach (Diez); Bayern Munich / Hannover 96; Van Bommel (yellow card) 18'; Olić 22', 49'; Robben 30', 50', 90'; Müller 44', 62' / Schulz (yellow card) 21'; Djakpa (yellow card) 42'
32	24 April	A	Borussia Mönchengladbach	1 – 1	1	64	37	Report / Report link; Kick off / 15:30 CEST; Attendance / 54,057 (sell-out); Referee / Michael Weiner (Giesen); Borussia Mönchengladbach / Bayern Munich; Bobadilla (yellow card) 56'; Reus 60'; Levels (yellow card) 90' / Van Buyten (yellow card) 62'; Badstuber (yellow card) 69'; Klose 73', (yellow card) 89'
33	1 May	H	VfL Bochum	3 – 1	1	67	39	Report / Report link; Kick off / 15:30 CEST; Attendance / 69,000 (sell-out); Referee / Markus Schmidt (Stuttgart); Bayern Munich / VfL Bochum; Demichelis (yellow card) 13'; Müller 18', 20', 69'; Van Bommel (yellow card) 84' / Fuchs 85'
34	8 May	A	Hertha BSC	3 – 1	1	70	41	Report / Report link; Kick off / 15:30 CEST; Attendance / 75,420 (sell-out); Referee / Florian Meyer (Burgdorf); Hertha BSC / Bayern Munich; Ramos 59' / Olić 20'; Robben 74', 87'

^{1}Bayern Munich goals come first.
Ground's country's flag and opponent's country's flag shown when from a different country of Bayern Munich.
Pos. = Position in league, Pts. = Points, GD = Goal difference, Ground: H = Home, A = Away, N = Neutral, HR = Home replacement, AR = Away replacement.

== DFB-Pokal ==
As determined by the seeding on 27 June 2009 Bayern's 2009–10 DFB-Pokal campaign began on 2 August 2009 with an away match at Neckarelz. Having defeated Rot-Weiß Oberhausen, Eintracht Frankfurt, and SpVgg Greuther Fürth in the following rounds, Bayern visited Schalke 04 in the semi-final on 24 March 2010. They won in extra time to face Werder Bremen who fell to the league champions by 4 goals.

2 August 2009 Round 1	Neckarelz	1 – 3	Bayern Munich	Sinsheim
17:30 CEST	Thom 80'; Fickert (yellow card) 57' (yellow-red card) 74'; Welz (yellow card) 83'	Report	Gómez 51', 57' (pen.); Altıntop 82'	Stadium: Rhein-Neckar-Arena; Attendance: 30,000 (capacity); Referee: Markus Wingenbach (Diez)

22 September 2009 Round 2	Bayern Munich	5 – 0	Rot-Weiß Oberhausen	Munich
19:00 CEST	Lahm 32'; Gómez 41'; Van Buyten 67', 86'; Müller 70'	Report	Gordon (yellow card) 50'; Heppke (yellow card) 82'	Stadium: Allianz Arena; Attendance: 40,000; Referee: Felix Zwayer (Berlin)

28 October 2009 Round 3	Eintracht Frankfurt	0 – 4	Bayern Munich	Frankfurt
20:30 CET	Ochs (yellow card) 68'	Report	Klose 14', 19'; Müller 29'; Toni 52'	Stadium: Commerzbank-Arena; Attendance: 51,500 (capacity); Referee: Thorsten Kinhöfer (Herne)

10 February 2010 Quarter-finals	Bayern Munich	6 – 2	SpVgg Greuther Fürth	Munich
19:00 CET	Müller 5', 82'; Robben (yellow card) 45' (goal) 58' (pen.); Ribéry 61'; Lahm 65'; Allagui 89' (o.g.)	Report	Nöthe 10'; Allagui 40'; Falkenberg (yellow card) 45'; Peković (yellow card) 60'	Stadium: Allianz Arena; Attendance: 53,500; Referee: Michael Weiner (Giesen)

24 March 2010 Semi-finals	Schalke 04	0 – 1 (a.e.t.)	Bayern Munich	Gelsenkirchen
20:30 CET		Report	Robben 112', (yellow card) 113'; Schweinsteiger (yellow card) 62'	Stadium: Arena AufSchalke; Attendance: 61,673 (capacity); Referee: Knut Kircher (Rottenburg)

15 May 2010 Final	Werder Bremen	0 – 4	Bayern Munich	Berlin
20:00 CEST	Frings (yellow card) 56' (yellow-red card) 77'; Fritz (yellow card) 66'; Borowski (yellow card) 68'	Report	Robben 35' (pen.); Olić (yellow card) 19', (goal) 51'; Ribéry 63'; Schweinsteiger 83'; Van Bommel (yellow card) 11'	Stadium: Olympiastadion; Attendance: 72,954 (capacity); Referee: Thorsten Kinhöfer (Herne)

== UEFA Champions League ==
Bayern qualified for the group stage of the Champions League with a second place Bundesliga finish in 2008–09. Bayern was drawn in Group A with Italian runner-up Juventus, French Champions Bordeaux, and Israeli Champions Maccabi Haifa. Following a second-placed finish in Group A, Bayern advanced to face the Italian side Fiorentina, who had won Group E.

=== Group stage ===
Pos	Team	Pld	W	D	L	GF	GA	GD	Pts	Qualification	BOR	BAY	JUV	MHA
1	(France) Bordeaux	6	5	1	0	9	2	+7	16	Advance to knockout phase	—	2–1	2–0	1–0
2	(Germany) Bayern Munich	6	3	1	2	9	5	+4	10	Advance to knockout phase	0–2	—	0–0	1–0
3	(Italy) Juventus	6	2	2	2	4	7	−3	8	Transfer to Europa League	1–1	1–4	—	1–0
4	(Israel) Maccabi Haifa	6	0	0	6	0	8	−8	0		0–1	0–3	0–1	—

Source: RSSSF

15 September 2009 1	Maccabi Haifa (Israel)	0 – 3	(Germany) Bayern Munich	Ramat Gan, Israel
20:45 CEST	Boccoli (yellow card) 80'	Report	Van Buyten 64'; Müller 85', 88'; Ribéry (yellow card) 48'; Lahm (yellow card) 84'	Stadium: Ramat Gan Stadium; Attendance: 38,789; Referee: Damir Skomina (Slovenia)

30 September 2009 2	Bayern Munich (Germany)	0 – 0	(Italy) Juventus	Munich, Germany
20:45 CEST		Report	Trezeguet (yellow card) 8'; Camoranesi (yellow card) 37'; Marchisio (yellow card) 57'	Stadium: Allianz Arena; Attendance: 66,000; Referee: Howard Webb (England)

21 October 2009 3	Bordeaux (France)	2 – 1	(Germany) Bayern Munich	Bordeaux, France
20:45 CEST	Ciani 29'; Planus 40'; Chamakh (yellow card) 52'; Gourcuff (yellow card) 55'	Report	Ciani 6' (o.g.); Badstuber (yellow card) 17'; Tymoshchuk (yellow card) 63'; Müller (yellow card) 13' (yellow-red card) 30'; Van Buyten (red card) 87'	Stadium: Stade Chaban-Delmas; Attendance: 31,321; Referee: Terje Hauge (Norway)

3 November 2009 4	Bayern Munich (Germany)	0 – 2	(France) Bordeaux	Munich, Germany
20:45 CET	Pranjić (yellow card) 45+1'; Schweinsteiger (yellow card) 75'	Report	Gourcuff 37'; Chamakh 90'; Diarra (yellow card) 30'; Planus (yellow card) 73'	Stadium: Allianz Arena; Attendance: 66,000; Referee: Pedro Proença (Portugal)

25 November 2009 5	Bayern Munich (Germany)	1 – 0	(Israel) Maccabi Haifa	Munich, Germany
20:45 CET	Olić 62'	Report	Masilela (yellow card) 57'; Arbeitman (yellow card) 81'	Stadium: Allianz Arena; Attendance: 58,000; Referee: Craig Thomson (Scotland)

8 December 2009 6	Juventus (Italy)	1 – 4	(Germany) Bayern Munich	Turin, Italy
20:45 CET	Trezeguet 19'	Report	Butt 30' (pen.); Olić 52'; Gómez 83'; Tymoshchuk 90+2'; Pranjić (yellow card) 7'; Schweinsteiger (yellow card) 58'; Demichelis (yellow card) 70'	Stadium: Stadio Olimpico di Torino; Attendance: 27,801; Referee: Massimo Busacca (Switzerland)

=== Knockout phase ===
==== Round of 16 ====
17 February 2010 First leg	Bayern Munich (Germany)	2 – 1	(Italy) Fiorentina	Munich
20:45 CET	Van Bommel (yellow card) 28'; Robben 45+3' (pen.); Klose (yellow card) 78' (goal) 89'	Report	Krøldrup 50'; De Silvestri (yellow card) 52'; Marchionni (yellow card) 77'; Vargas (yellow card) 90'; Gobbi (red card) 73'	Stadium: Fußball Arena München; Attendance: 66,000; Referee: Tom Henning Øvrebø (Norway)

9 March 2010 Second leg	Fiorentina (Italy)	3 – 2 (4 – 4a agg.)	(Germany) Bayern Munich	Florence, Italy
20:45 CET	Vargas 27'; Jovetić 54', 64'; Krøldrup (yellow card) 39'; Felipe (yellow card) 78'	Report	Van Bommel 60', (yellow card) 85'; Robben 65'; Schweinsteiger (yellow card) 22'	Stadium: Stadio Artemio Franchi; Attendance: 42,762; Referee: Alberto Undiano Mallenco (Spain)
Note: Bayern Munich win on away goals.

==== Quarter-finals ====
30 March 2010 First leg	Bayern Munich (Germany)	2 – 1	(England) Manchester United	Munich
20:45 CEST	Ribéry 77'; Olić 90+2', (yellow card) 90+3'; Badstuber (yellow card) 57'	Report	Rooney 2', (yellow card) 88'; Neville (yellow card) 76'; Scholes (yellow card) 78'	Stadium: Fußball Arena München; Attendance: 66,000; Referee: Frank De Bleeckere (Belgium)

7 April 2010 Second leg	Manchester United (England)	3 – 2 (4 – 4a agg.)	(Germany) Bayern Munich	Manchester, England
20:45 CEST	Gibson 3'; Rafael (yellow card) 18' (yellow-red card) 50'; Nani 7', 41'	Report	Van Bommel (yellow card) 28'; Olić 43'; Badstuber (yellow card) 54'; Robben 74'	Stadium: Old Trafford; Attendance: 74,482; Referee: Nicola Rizzoli (Italy)
Note: Bayern Munich win on away goals.

==== Semi-finals ====
21 April 2010 First leg	Bayern Munich (Germany)	1 – 0	(France) Lyon	Munich
20:45 CEST	Robben 69'; Pranjić (yellow card) 25'; Ribéry (red card) 37'	Report	Toulalan (yellow card) 51' (yellow-red card) 54'; Bastos (yellow card) 79'	Stadium: Fußball Arena München; Attendance: 66,000 (capacity); Referee: Roberto Rosetti (Italy)

27 April 2010 Second leg	Lyon (France)	0 – 3 (0 – 4 agg.)	(Germany) Bayern Munich	Lyon, France
20:45 CEST	Gonalons (yellow card) 23'; Cris (yellow card) 59' (yellow-red card) 59'	Report	Hamit Altıntop (yellow card) 24'; Olić 26', 67', 78'	Stadium: Stade de Gerland; Attendance: 39,414; Referee: Massimo Busacca (Switzerland)

==== Final ====
22 May 2010	Bayern Munich (Germany)	0 – 2	(Italy) Internazionale	Madrid, Spain
20:45 CEST	Demichelis (yellow card) 26'; Van Bommel (yellow card) 78'	Report	Milito 35', 70'; Chivu (yellow card) 30'	Stadium: Santiago Bernabéu Stadium; Attendance: 80,100; Referee: Howard Webb (England)

== Friendlies ==
=== T-Home-Cup ===
The official league cup again was not held this season. Instead Bayern participated in the T-Home Cup on 18–19 July in Gelsenkirchen. The other contestants were Schalke, Hamburg, and Stuttgart. Matches in the tournament are played with halves of 30 minutes only.

18 July 2009
18:35 CEST

Bayern Munich	0–1	Hamburger SV
	Report	Trochowski 40'

Arena AufSchalke (Gelsenkirchen)
Attendance: 34,350
Referee: Thorsten Kinhöfer (Herne)

19 July 2009
16:45 CEST

Schalke	1–2	Bayern Munich
Altıntop 29'	Report	Breno (yellow card) , (goal) 13'; Höwedes 26' (o.g.); Görlitz (yellow card)

Arena AufSchalke (Gelsenkirchen)
Attendance: 40,000
Referee: Guido Winkelmann (Kerken)

=== Audi Cup ===
Bayern hosted the inaugural Audi Cup on 29–30 July in Munich to celebrate their partner Audi's 100th anniversary. The invited opponents were Milan, Boca Juniors, and Manchester United. Bayern won the tournament by defeating Milan in the semi-final and Manchester United on penalties in the final.

29 July 2009
20:45 CEST

Bayern Munich	4–1	Milan
Müller 11', 90'; Schweinsteiger 80'; Sène 89'; Van Bommel (yellow card)	Report	Pirlo 81'

Allianz Arena (Munich)
Attendance: 61,000
Referee: Günter Perl (Munich)

30 July 2009
20:45 CEST

Bayern Munich	0–0	Manchester United
	Report
Penalties
Baumjohann (penalty scored) Braafheid (penalty scored); Altıntop (penalty scored); Pranjić (penalty missed); Sosa (penalty scored); Ottl (penalty scored); Badstuber (penalty scored) Van Buyten (penalty scored)	7–6	Giggs (penalty scored) Anderson (penalty scored); Nani (penalty scored); Evra (penalty missed); Rooney (penalty scored); Fletcher (penalty scored); Scholes (penalty scored) Evans (penalty missed)

Allianz Arena (Munich)
Attendance: 69,000 (capacity)
Referee: Dr. Felix Brych (Munich)

=== Other ===
The friendly at Salzburg was also the farewell game for former Bayern midfielder Niko Kovač, who played from 2001 to 2003 for Bayern and from 2006 to 2009 for Salzburg.

10 July 2009
20:15 CEST

Red Bull Salzburg	0–0	Bayern Munich
Ngwat-Mahop (yellow card)	Report	Braafheid (yellow card); Baumjohann (yellow card)

Red Bull Arena, Wals-Siezenheim
Attendance: 32,000 (capacity)
Referee: Louis Hofmann

The fanclub "De rodn Waginga" won the right to host the annual Dream Game, a game Bayern contests against one of its fanclubs with the earnings going to charity. In the second half the fanclub members left the field to the local club TSV Waging.

11 July 2009

De rodn Waginga TSV Waging	0–11	Bayern Munich
	Report	Müller 11'; Altıntop 24', 41'; Sène 28', 34'; Klose 58', 72'; Gómez 66', 74'; Tymoshchuk 75'; Badstuber 90'

Waging am See
Attendance: 15,000

This match was dedicated to the memory of former Kickers president Axel Dünnwald-Metzler.

21 July 2009

Stuttgarter Kickers	0–10	Bayern Munich
	Report	Gómez 15', 86'; Olić 58', 68', 83'; Müller 60', 77', 81'; Altıntop 61'; Görlitz 72'

GAZi-Stadion auf der Waldau, Stuttgart
Attendance: 10,899 (capacity)

This was the first match with Lukas Podolski starting for Köln again. After a three-year stay at Bayern Podolski had returned to his home club Köln in summer 2009.

24 July 2009
20:45 CEST

1. FC Köln	0–2	Bayern Munich
	Report	Gómez 19'; Schweinsteiger 73'; Van Bommel (yellow card)

RheinEnergieStadion, Cologne
Attendance: 50,000 (capacity)
Referee: Guido Winkmann (Kerken)

The match was a benefit match. McFit, a chain of fitness studios, had paid €1 million for the match in an action favoring the Ein Herz für Kinder foundation. The McFit team was captained by Oliver Pocher and included other German celebrities like Johannes B. Kerner. Also a few former professional footballers like Mario Basler, Ebbe Sand, and Thomas Häßler complemented the amateur squad.

25 July 2009

McFit Allstars	0–13	Bayern Munich
	Report	Klose 10', 25', 28', 64', 81'; Görlitz 12'; Schweinsteiger 14'; Tymoshchuk 57'; Baumjohann 67'; Demichelis 70'; Lahm 74'; Sosa 76'; Altıntop 87' (pen.)

Arena AufSchalke, Gelsenkirchen
Attendance: 50,000
Referee: Christian Bandurski (Essen)

NFV Gelb-Weiß Görlitz is the youth club of former Bayern midfielder Jens Jeremies. Bayern played against Görlitz for a friendly on the occasion of their centenary.

18 August 2009

NFV Gelb-Weiß Görlitz	0–10	Bayern Munich
Jablonski (yellow card)	Report	Olić 17', 29', 57'; Müller 34', 37', 68'; Klose 36', 67'; Lell 42'; Görlitz 85'

Junge Welt, Görlitz
Attendance: 6,521 (capacity)
Referee: Jens Klemm (Gröditz)

The game was held to celebrate the 375th anniversary of Bayern's partner and Munich based brewery Paulaner.

26 August 2009

Union Berlin	1–3	Bayern Munich
Şahin 69'	Report	Olić 22'; Breno 30'; Braafheid 47'

Stadion An der Alten Försterei, Berlin
Attendance: 19,000 (capacity)
Referee: Felix Zwayer (Berlin)

Bayern arranged this friendly game to give Mark van Bommel, Luca Toni, and Martín Demichelis some practice after their injuries. Demichelis was called up for the Argentina national team, though.

13 October 2009
19:00 CET

Jahn Regensburg	1–0	Bayern Munich
Shynder 46'	Report

Jahnstadion, Regensburg
Attendance: 9,000
Referee: Deniz Aytekin (Oberasbach)

This game against the U-20 Netherlands national team was arranged to give some players match practice who had played few or no competitive matches at the time like Lell, Breno, or Rensing.

13 November 2009

Bayern Munich	2–0	Netherlands U-20
Altıntop 58' (pen.); Toni 85'	Report

Bayern training premises, Munich
Attendance: 500

12 January 2010
19:00 CET

Basel	1–3	Bayern Munich
Streller 10'; Atan (yellow card)	Report	Altıntop 73'; Klose 85', 87'

St. Jakob-Park, Basel
Attendance: 20,087

Bayern organized this friendly to give some of their players, especially Ribéry, additional match practice.

26 January 2010
14:00 CET

Bayern Munich	2–0	Ingolstadt
Yılmaz 53', 87'; Lell (yellow card)	Report	Wohlfarth (yellow card)

Bayern training premises, Munich
Attendance: 500
Referee: René Neubert

== Players ==
=== Squad information ===
N	Pos.	Nat.	Name	Age	EU	Since	App	Goals	Ends	Transfer fee	Notes
1	GK	(Germany)	Michael Rensing	26	EU	2003	53	0	2010	Youth system	
22	GK	(Germany)	Hans-Jörg Butt	35	EU	2008	30	1	2011	Free	
35	GK	(Germany)	Thomas Kraft	21	EU	2006	0	0	2011	Youth system	
5	DF	(Belgium)	Daniel Van Buyten	32	EU	2006	91	13	2012	€10M	
6	DF	(Argentina)	Martín Demichelis	29	Non-EU	2003	162	12	2012	€5M	
13	DF	(Germany)	Andreas Görlitz	28	EU	2009	18	0	2010	Loan return	
21	DF	(Germany)	Philipp Lahm (VC)	26	EU	2005	129	4	2012	Loan return	
23	DF	(Croatia)	Danijel Pranjić	28	EU	2009	12	1	2012	€7.7M	
26	DF	(Germany)	Diego Contento	20	EU	2010 (Winter)	3	0	2013	Youth system	
28	DF	(Germany)	Holger Badstuber	21	EU	2008	27	1	2014	Youth system	
30	DF	(Germany)	Christian Lell	25	EU	2003	65	1	2011	Youth system	
7	MF	(France)	Franck Ribéry	27	EU	2007	65	23	2015	€25M	
8	MF	(Turkey)	Hamit Altıntop	27	EU	2007	47	5	2011	Free	
10	MF	(Netherlands)	Arjen Robben	26	EU	2009	18	10	2013	€24M	
17	MF	(Netherlands)	Mark van Bommel (captain)	33	EU	2006	105	11	2011	€6M	
31	MF	(Germany)	Bastian Schweinsteiger (VC2)	25	EU	2002	209	22	2012	Youth system	
27	MF	(Austria)	David Alaba	17	EU	2010 (Winter)	3	0	TBA *	Youth system	* = David Alaba has an amateur contract, but plays for the professional team. It was announced that he will get a pro contract after the season.
32	MF	(Germany)	Mehmet Ekici	20	EU	2010 (Winter)	0	0	2011	Youth system	
44	MF	(Ukraine)	Anatoliy Tymoshchuk	31	Non-EU	2009	17	0	2012	€11M	
11	FW	(Croatia)	Ivica Olić	30	EU	2009	23	8	2012	Free	
18	FW	(Germany)	Miroslav Klose	31	EU	2007	71	21	2011	€12M	
25	FW	(Germany)	Thomas Müller	20	EU	2008	32	7	2013	Youth system	
33	FW	(Germany)	Mario Gómez	24	EU	2009	25	10	2013	€35M	

- Last updated: 2 April 2010
- Source: Summer transfers and Winter transfers, players' articles (for appearances and goals)
- Ordered by position on pitch.

=== Transfers in ===
No.	Pos.	Nat.	Name	Age	EU	Moving from	Type	Transfer window	Ends	Transfer fee	Source
4	DF	(Netherlands)	Edson Braafheid	27	EU	Twente (Netherlands)	Transfer	Summer	2013	€2M	
13	DF	(Germany)	Andreas Görlitz	28	EU	Karlsruher SC	Loan return	Summer	2010	n/a	
10	MF	(Netherlands)	Arjen Robben	26	EU	Real Madrid (Spain)	Transfer	Summer	2013	€24M	
23	DF	(Croatia)	Danijel Pranjić	28	EU	Heerenveen (Netherlands)	Transfer	Summer	2012	€7.7M	
44	MF	(Ukraine)	Anatoliy Tymoshchuk	31	EU	Zenit St. Petersburg (Russia)	Transfer	Summer	2012	€11M	
11	FW	(Croatia)	Ivica Olić	30	EU	Hamburger SV	End of contract	Summer	2012	Free	
33	FW	(Germany)	Mario Gómez	24	EU	VfB Stuttgart	Transfer	Summer	2013	€35m	
26	DF	(Germany)	Diego Contento	20	EU	Youth system	Promoted	Winter	2011	n/a	
27	MF	(Austria)	David Alaba	17	EU	Youth system	Promoted	Winter	TBA	n/a	
32	MF	(Germany)	Mehmet Ekici	20	EU	Youth system	Promoted	Winter	2011	n/a	

Total spending: ▼€79.7 million

=== Transfers out ===
No.	Pos.	Nat.	Name	Age	EU	Moving to	Type	Transfer window	Transfer fee	Source
6	DF	(Brazil)	Lúcio	32	Non-EU	Inter Milan (Italy)	Transfer	Summer	€7m	
6	MF	(Germany)	Tim Borowski	30	EU	Werder Bremen	Transfer	Summer	€0.75M	
15	DF	(Germany)	Mats Hummels	21	EU	Borussia Dortmund	Transfer	Summer	€4.2M	
10	FW	(Germany)	Lukas Podolski	24	EU	1. FC Köln	Transfer	Summer	€10M	
7	MF	(Argentina)	José Sosa	24	Non-EU	Estudiantes (LP)	Loan	Summer	Free	
44	DF	(Italy)	Massimo Oddo	33	EU	Milan (Italy)	Loan return	Summer	n/a	
11	MF	(Germany)	Alexander Baumjohann	23	EU	Schalke 04	Transfer	Winter	€1M	
3	DF	(Brazil)	Breno Borges	20	Non-EU	1. FC Nürnberg	Loan	Winter	Free	
23	MF	(Germany)	Andreas Ottl	25	EU	1. FC Nürnberg	Loan	Winter	Free	
30	FW	(Italy)	Luca Toni	32	EU	Roma (Italy)	Loan	Winter	Free	
4	DF	(Netherlands)	Edson Braafheid	27	EU	Celtic (Scotland)	Loan	Winter	?	

Last updated: 22 May
Total income: ▲€22.95 million

=== Individual statistics ===
No.	Pos	Nat	Player	Total		Bundesliga		Champions League		DFB-Pokal	
No.	Pos	Nat	Player	Apps	Goals	Apps	Goals	Apps	Goals	Apps	Goals
1	GK	(Germany) GER	Michael Rensing	7	0	3+1	0	0+0	0	3+0	0
22	GK	(Germany) GER	Hans-Jörg Butt	47	1	31+0	0	13+0	1	3+0	0
35	GK	(Germany) GER	Thomas Kraft	0	0	0+0	0	0+0	0	0+0	0
5	DF	(Belgium) BEL	Daniel Van Buyten	48	9	31+0	6	12+0	1	5+0	2
6	DF	(Argentina) ARG	Martín Demichelis	34	1	17+4	1	8+1	0	3+1	0
13	DF	(Germany) GER	Andreas Görlitz	1	0	0+0	0	0+0	0	0+1	0
21	DF	(Germany) GER	Philipp Lahm (vice-captain)	53	1	34+0	0	13+0	0	6+0	1
26	DF	(Germany) GER	Diego Contento	14	0	8+1	0	2+1	0	1+1	0
27	MF	(Austria) AUT	David Alaba	6	0	2+1	0	1+1	0	1+0	0
28	DF	(Germany) GER	Holger Badstuber	49	1	33+0	1	12+0	0	4+0	0
30	DF	(Germany) GER	Christian Lell	1	0	0+0	0	0+0	0	1+0	0
7	MF	(France) FRA	Franck Ribéry	30	7	10+9	4	7+0	1	3+1	2
8	MF	(Turkey) TUR	Hamit Altıntop	26	1	7+8	0	4+2	0	2+3	1
10	MF	(Netherlands) NED	Arjen Robben	37	23	18+6	16	8+2	4	3+0	3
17	MF	(Netherlands) NED	Mark van Bommel (captain)	40	2	25+0	1	10+0	1	5+0	0
23	MF	(Croatia) CRO	Danijel Pranjić	31	1	14+6	1	6+3	0	1+1	0
25	MF	(Germany) GER	Thomas Müller	52	19	29+5	13	12+0	2	5+1	4
31	MF	(Germany) GER	Bastian Schweinsteiger	49	3	33+0	2	12+0	0	4+0	1
32	MF	(Germany) GER	Mehmet Ekici	0	0	0+0	0	0+0	0	0+0	0
44	MF	(Ukraine) UKR	Anatoliy Tymoshchuk	32	1	11+10	0	3+4	1	2+2	0
11	FW	(Croatia) CRO	Ivica Olić	41	19	23+6	11	8+2	5+2	2+0	1
18	FW	(Germany) GER	Miroslav Klose	38	6	11+14	3	3+5	1	4+1	2
33	FW	(Germany) GER	Mario Gómez	45	14	21+8	10	4+8	1	3+1	3
Players sold or loaned out after the start of the season:
4	DF	(Netherlands) NED	Edson Braafheid	14	0	5+4	0	2+0	0	2+1	0
9	FW	(Italy) ITA	Luca Toni	8	1	3+1	0	2+0	0	1+1	1
15	DF	(Brazil) BRA	Breno	3	0	1+2	0	0+0	0	0+0	0
16	MF	(Germany) GER	Andreas Ottl	9	0	1+3	0	1+3	0	1+0	0
19	MF	(Germany) GER	Alexander Baumjohann	4	0	1+2	0	0+0	0	0+1	0
20	MF	(Argentina) ARG	José Sosa	6	0	2+1	0	0+1	0	1+1	0

=== Goals ===
Pos.	Player	BL	CL	Cup	Overall
1	(Netherlands) Arjen Robben	16	4	3	23
2	(Germany) Thomas Müller	13	2	4	19
2	(Croatia) Ivica Olić	11	7	1	19
4	(Germany) Mario Gómez	10	1	3	14
5	(Belgium) Daniel Van Buyten	6	1	2	9

=== Bookings ===
According to a statistic of the German football magazine Kicker Bayern was the fairest team in the 2009–10 Bundesliga.

N	Pos.	Nat.	Name	Yellow card	Second yellow card	Red card	Notes
22	GK	(Germany)	Hans-Jörg Butt	1			
5	DF	(Belgium)	Daniel Van Buyten	2		1	
6	DF	(Argentina)	Martín Demichelis	7			
21	DF	(Germany)	Philipp Lahm	2			
28	DF	(Germany)	Holger Badstuber	6			
7	MF	(France)	Franck Ribéry	2		1	
8	MF	(Turkey)	Hamit Altıntop	2	1		
10	MF	(Netherlands)	Arjen Robben	3			
17	MF	(Netherlands)	Mark van Bommel	16			
23	MF	(Croatia)	Danijel Pranjić	4			
31	MF	(Germany)	Bastian Schweinsteiger	10			
44	MF	(Ukraine)	Anatoliy Tymoshchuk	3			
11	FW	(Croatia)	Ivica Olić	3			
18	FW	(Germany)	Miroslav Klose	3			
25	MF	(Germany)	Thomas Müller	3	1		
33	FW	(Germany)	Mario Gómez	1			
4	DF	(Netherlands)	Edson Braafheid	1			
9	FW	(Italy)	Luca Toni	1			

Last updated: 22 May 2010
Source: Season 2009–10 Stats
Only competitive matches
(yellow card) = Number of bookings; (second yellow card) = Number of sending offs after a second yellow card; (red card) = Number of sending offs by a direct red card.

== Management and coaching staff ==
Bayern had to change their coaching staff after the 2008–09 season as former head coach Jürgen Klinsmann was sacked during the season and his successor, Jupp Heynckes, was appointed as an interim only. With Klinsmann a few of the assistants he had brought in were dismissed. Louis van Gaal was hired as the new manager and took over on 1 July 2009. He brought some personnel of his own to the club.

Position	Staff
Manager	Louis van Gaal
Assistant manager	Andries Jonker
Assistant manager	Hermann Gerland
Goalkeeping coach	Walter Junghans
Sports psychologist	Philipp Laux
Fitness and rehab coach	Thomas Wilhelmi
Fitness coach	Marcelo Martins
Fitness coach	Darcy Norman
Leading physician	Hans-Wilhelm Müller-Wohlfahrt
Physician	Lutz Hänsel
Physician	Peter Ueblacker
Physiotherapist	Fredi Binder
Physiotherapist	Gerry Hoffmann
Physiotherapist	Stephan Weickert
Physiotherapist	Gianni Bianchi
Analyst	Max Reckers
Training physiologist	Jos van Dijk
