= 2017 Telekom Cup (July) =

Tournament details
- Host country: Germany
- City: Mönchengladbach
- Dates: 15 July 2017
- Teams: 4 (from 1 confederation)
- Venue: 1 (in 1 host city)

Final positions
- Champions: Bayern Munich (4th title)
- Runners-up: Werder Bremen
- Third place: 1899 Hoffenheim
- Fourth place: Borussia Mönchengladbach

Tournament statistics
- Matches played: 4
- Goals scored: 3 (0.75 per match)
- Top scorer(s): Juan Bernat; Robert Lewandowski; Thomas Müller (1 goal each)

The July 2017 Telekom Cup was the 9th edition of the Telekom Cup, a football friendly tournament organized by Deutsche Telekom, who was also the sponsor. It was hosted by Borussia Mönchengladbach at the BORUSSIA-PARK in Mönchengladbach, on 15 July 2017. Alongside the hosts, Bayern Munich, 1899 Hoffenheim, and Werder Bremen also took part.

Bayern Munich won their fourth title following a 2–0 win over Werder Bremen in the final.

== Participants ==
Nation	Team	Location	Confederation	League	Tournament appearance	Last appearance	Previous best performance
Germany	Borussia Mönchengladbach (hosts)	Mönchengladbach	UEFA	Bundesliga	5th	2017	Runners-up (2013)
Germany	Bayern Munich	Munich	UEFA	Bundesliga	9th	2017	Winners (2013, 2014, winter 2017)
Germany	1899 Hoffenheim	Sinsheim	UEFA	Bundesliga	1st	—	Debut
Germany	Werder Bremen	Bremen	UEFA	Bundesliga	2nd	2012	Winners (2012)

== Bracket ==
Semi-finals
15 July
Borussia Mönchengladbach	0 (3)
Werder Bremen	0 (5)
15 July
Bayern Munich	1
1899 Hoffenheim	0

Final
15 July
Werder Bremen	0
Bayern Munich	2
Third place play-off
15 July
Borussia Mönchengladbach	0 (5)
1899 Hoffenheim	0 (6)

== Matches ==
All matches lasted for just 45 minutes. If a match was level after normal time then a penalty shoot-out was played to decide who advanced.

All times Central European Summer Time (UTC+2)

=== Semi-finals ===
15 July 2017
14:00

Borussia Mönchengladbach	0–0	Werder Bremen
	Report
Penalties
Strobl (penalty scored); Hofmann (penalty scored); Raffael (penalty scored); Cuisance (penalty missed)	3–5	(penalty scored) Gondorf; (penalty scored) Caldirola; (penalty scored) M. Eggestein; (penalty scored) Delaney; (penalty scored) Kruse

BORUSSIA-PARK, Mönchengladbach
Referee: Guido Winkmann

15 July 2017
15:15

Bayern Munich	1–0	1899 Hoffenheim
Lewandowski 7'	Report

BORUSSIA-PARK, Mönchengladbach
Referee: Sascha Stegemann

=== Third place play-off ===
15 July 2017
16:30

Borussia Mönchengladbach	0–0	1899 Hoffenheim
	Report
Penalties
Strobl (penalty scored); Herrmann (penalty scored); Grifo (penalty scored); Sow (penalty scored); Zakaria (penalty scored); Mayer (penalty missed)	5–6	(penalty scored) Schär; (penalty scored) Ochs; (penalty scored) Zuber; (penalty scored) Terrazzino; (penalty scored) Posch; (penalty scored) Bičakčić

BORUSSIA-PARK, Mönchengladbach
Referee: Guido Winkmann

=== Final ===
15 July 2017
17:45

Werder Bremen	0–2	Bayern Munich
	Report	Müller 13'; Bernat 34'

BORUSSIA-PARK, Mönchengladbach
Referee: Sascha Stegemann

== Goalscorers ==
Rank	Name	Team	Goals
1	(Spain) Juan Bernat	Bayern Munich	1
1	(Poland) Robert Lewandowski	Bayern Munich	1
1	(Germany) Thomas Müller	Bayern Munich	1
