= Telekom Cup =

- Founded: 2009
- Region: Germany
- Teams: 4 (each year); 12 (all time)
- Current champions: Bayern Munich (6th title)
- Most championships: Bayern Munich (6 titles)
- Broadcaster: Sat.1
- Website: Official website
- 2025 Telekom Cup

The Telekom Cup (formerly known as T-Home Cup and LIGA total! Cup) is a German association football off season friendly competition held since 2009.

The competition features four teams of the Bundesliga, playing two semi-finals and a final. Up until 2015, a match lasted 60 minutes, with each half 30 minutes long. The tournament would be over two days, with two games in each day. In 2015 the rules changed, where there would only be one 45 minute period, and all four matches take place in the same day. The event took place in Gelsenkirchen in 2009 and 2010, Mainz in 2011, Hamburg in 2012, Mönchengladbach in 2013, again in Hamburg for the 2014 edition, and again in Mönchengladbach in 2015. It was announced that no 2016 tournament would be held.

The next tournament was held in January 2017, with the tournament taking place in Düsseldorf. The tournament was held next in July 2017, taking place in Mönchengladbach. Bayern Munich hold the most titles, with six. They are the only team to have participated in the first nine editions of the tournament.

After a break of two years due to the COVID-19 breakout, a single-match edition of the tournament took place in 2022 in Cologne; it saw 1. FC Köln face Milan, the latter winning its first title.

== Tournaments ==
=== 2009 T-Home Cup ===
==== Bracket ====
Semi-finals
18 July 2009
Schalke 04	0
VfB Stuttgart	1
18 July 2009
Bayern Munich	0
Hamburger SV	1

Final
19 July 2009
VfB Stuttgart	0
Hamburger SV	3
Third place play-off
19 July 2009
Schalke 04	1
Bayern Munich	2

==== Matches ====
18 July 2009 Semi-finals	Schalke 04	0–1	VfB Stuttgart	Gelsenkirchen
16:45 CEST (UTC+02:00)		Report	Rudy 34'	Stadium: Veltins-Arena; Attendance: 34,350; Referee: Guido Winkmann

18 July 2009 Semi-finals	Bayern Munich	0–1	Hamburger SV	Gelsenkirchen
18:35 CEST (UTC+02:00)		Report	Trochowski 40'	Stadium: Veltins-Arena; Attendance: 34,350; Referee: Thorsten Kinhöfer

19 July 2009 Third place play-off	Schalke 04	1–2	Bayern Munich	Gelsenkirchen
16:45 CEST (UTC+02:00)	Altıntop 29'	Report	Borges 13'; Höwedes 26' (o.g.)	Stadium: Veltins-Arena; Attendance: 38,820; Referee: Guido Winkmann

19 July 2009 Final	VfB Stuttgart	0–3	Hamburger SV	Gelsenkirchen
18:35 CEST (UTC+02:00)		Report	Benjamin 25'; Pitroipa 28'; Petrić 58'	Stadium: Veltins-Arena; Attendance: 38,820; Referee: Thorsten Kinhöfer

=== 2010 LIGA total! Cup ===
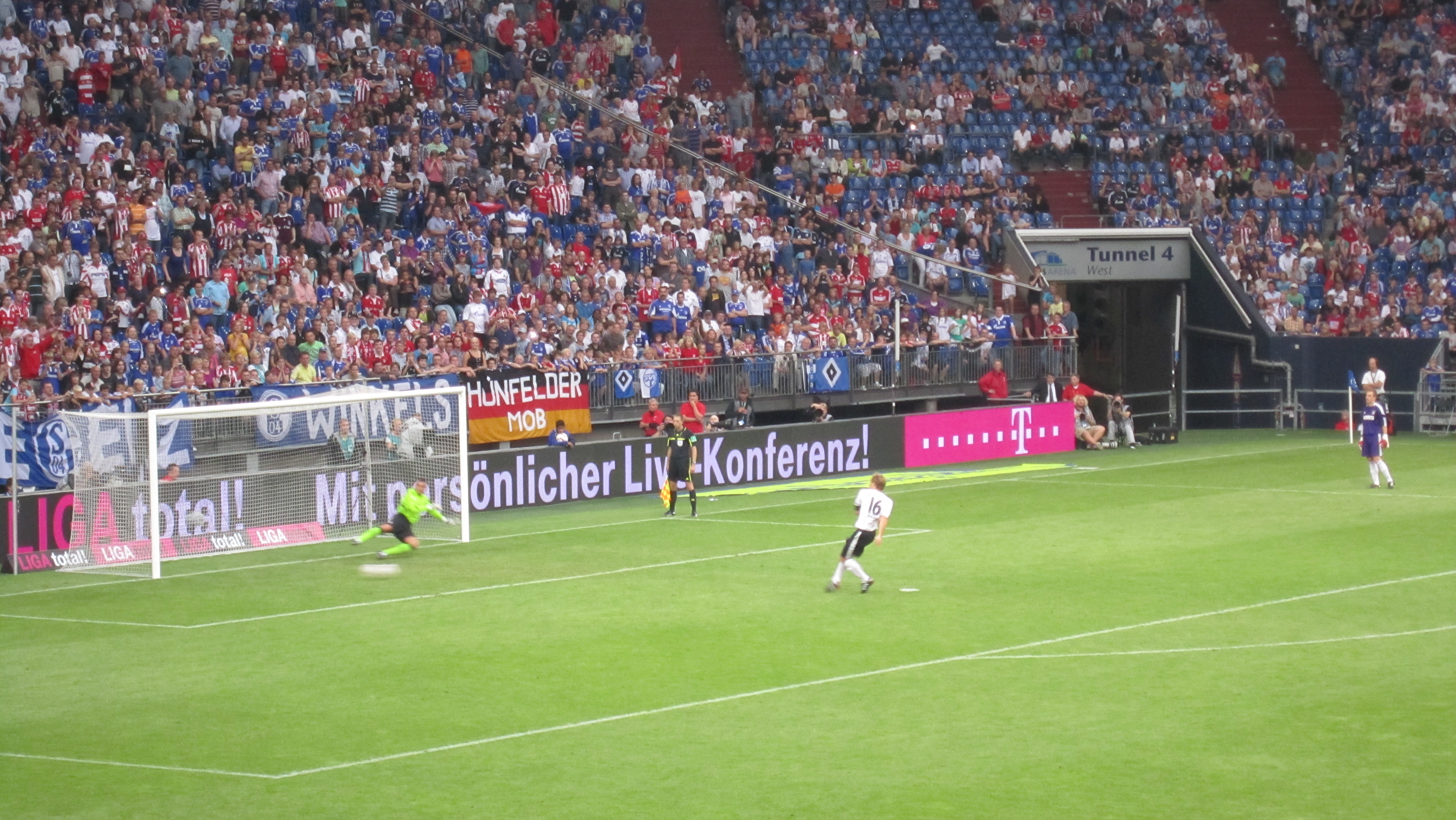
Andreas Ottl took and scored the first penalty kick for Bayern Munich against 1. FC Köln at the 2010 LIGA total! Cup

==== Bracket ====
Semi-finals
31 July 2010
Schalke 04	2
Hamburger SV	1
31 July 2010
Bayern Munich	0 (3)
1. FC Köln	0 (1)

Final
1 August 2010
Schalke 04	3
Bayern Munich	1
Third place play-off
1 August 2010
Hamburger SV	3
1. FC Köln	0

==== Matches ====
31 July 2010 Semi-finals	Schalke 04	2–1	Hamburger SV	Gelsenkirchen
16:45 CEST (UTC+02:00)	Edu 42'; Jones 49'	Report	Van Nistelrooy 6'	Stadium: Veltins-Arena; Attendance: 45,000; Referee: Thorsten Kinhöfer

31 July 2010 Semi-finals	Bayern Munich	0–0 (3–1 p)	1. FC Köln	Gelsenkirchen
18:35 CEST (UTC+02:00)		Report		Stadium: Veltins-Arena; Attendance: 42,000; Referee: Christian Fischer
	Penalties
	Ottl (penalty scored); Tymoshchuk (penalty scored); Olić (penalty scored)		(penalty missed) Lanig; (penalty scored) Yalçın
Note: The penalty shoot-out consisted of three rounds of kicks (best of three) instead of the usual best of five before going into extra sudden death rounds.

1 August 2010 Third place play-off	Hamburger SV	3–0	1. FC Köln	Gelsenkirchen
16:45 CEST (UTC+02:00)	Van Nistelrooy 27'; Kačar 36'; Son 55'	Report		Stadium: Veltins-Arena; Attendance: 40,000; Referee: Christian Fischer

1 August 2010 Final	Schalke 04	3–1	Bayern Munich	Gelsenkirchen
18:35 CEST (UTC+02:00)	Raúl 25', 33'; Edu 27'	Report	Mujić 6'	Stadium: Veltins-Arena; Attendance: 38,236; Referee: Thorsten Kinhöfer

=== 2011 LIGA total! Cup ===
==== Bracket ====
Semi-finals
19 July 2011
Mainz 05	0
Borussia Dortmund	1
19 July 2011
Bayern Munich	1
Hamburger SV	2

Final
20 July 2011
Borussia Dortmund	2
Hamburger SV	0
Third place play-off
20 July 2011
Mainz 05	2 (4)
Bayern Munich	2 (5)

==== Matches ====
19 July 2011 Semi-finals	Mainz 05	0–1	Borussia Dortmund	Mainz
18:45 CEST (UTC+02:00)		Report	Perišić 33'	Stadium: Coface Arena; Attendance: 33,500; Referee: Tobias Welz

19 July 2011 Semi-finals	Bayern Munich	1–2	Hamburger SV	Mainz
20:30 CEST (UTC+02:00)	Kroos 57'	Report	Son 7', 30'	Stadium: Coface Arena; Attendance: 30,900; Referee: Tobias Christ

20 July 2011 Third place play-off	Mainz 05	2–2 (4–5 p)	Bayern Munich	Mainz
18:45 CEST (UTC+02:00)	Noveski 11'; Ujah 59'	Report	Alaba 30+1'; Petersen 57' (pen.)	Stadium: Coface Arena; Attendance: 33,500; Referee: Jochen Drees
	Penalties
	Soto (penalty scored); Slišković (penalty scored); Yılmaz (penalty scored); Stieber (penalty scored); Noveski (penalty missed); Ujah (penalty missed)		(penalty scored) Alaba; (penalty scored) Müller; (penalty missed) Petersen; (penalty scored) Kroos; (penalty scored) Tymoshchuk; (penalty scored) Pranjić

20 July 2011 Final	Borussia Dortmund	2–0	Hamburger SV	Mainz
20:30 CEST (UTC+02:00)	Santana 50'; Zidan 51'	Report		Stadium: Coface Arena; Attendance: 32,284; Referee: Jochen Drees

=== 2012 LIGA total! Cup ===
==== Bracket ====
Semi-finals
4 August 2012
Hamburger SV	0
Borussia Dortmund	1
4 August 2012
Werder Bremen	2 (4)
Bayern Munich	2 (2)

Final
5 August 2012
Borussia Dortmund	3 (4)
Werder Bremen	3 (5)
Third place play-off
5 August 2012
Hamburger SV	0
Bayern Munich	1

==== Matches ====
4 August 2012 Semi-finals	Hamburger SV	0–1	Borussia Dortmund	Hamburg
16:45 CEST (UTC+02:00)		Report	Błaszczykowski 42'	Stadium: Imtech Arena; Attendance: 41,000; Referee: Hans-Joachim Osmers

4 August 2012 Semi-finals	Werder Bremen	2–2 (4–2 p)	Bayern Munich	Hamburg
18:35 CEST (UTC+02:00)	Petersen 12'; Füllkrug 43'	Report	Shaqiri 27'; Kroos 60'	Stadium: Imtech Arena; Attendance: 42,217; Referee: Norbert Grudzinski
	Penalties
	Ekici (penalty scored); Fritz (penalty scored); Schmitz (penalty scored); De Bruyne (penalty scored)		(penalty scored) Mandžukić; (penalty scored) Kroos; (penalty missed) Ribéry; (penalty missed) Schweinsteiger

5 August 2012 Third place play-off	Hamburger SV	0–1	Bayern Munich	Hamburg
16:45 CEST (UTC+02:00)		Report	Weiser 25'	Stadium: Imtech Arena; Attendance: 45,000; Referee: Daniel Siebert

5 August 2012 Final	Borussia Dortmund	3–3 (4–5 p)	Werder Bremen	Hamburg
18:35 CEST (UTC+02:00)	Reus 22'; Lewandowski 24', 25'	Report	Füllkrug 3'; Ekici 5'; Hunt 49' (pen.)	Stadium: Imtech Arena; Attendance: 39,175; Referee: Felix Zwayer
	Penalties
	Subotić (penalty missed); Halstenberg (penalty scored); Kehl (penalty scored); Owomoyela (penalty scored); Perišić (penalty scored); Großkreutz (penalty missed)		(penalty scored) Hunt; (penalty missed) Fritz; (penalty scored) Wurtz; (penalty scored) Junuzović; (penalty scored) Füllkrug; (penalty scored) Prödl

=== 2013 Telekom Cup ===
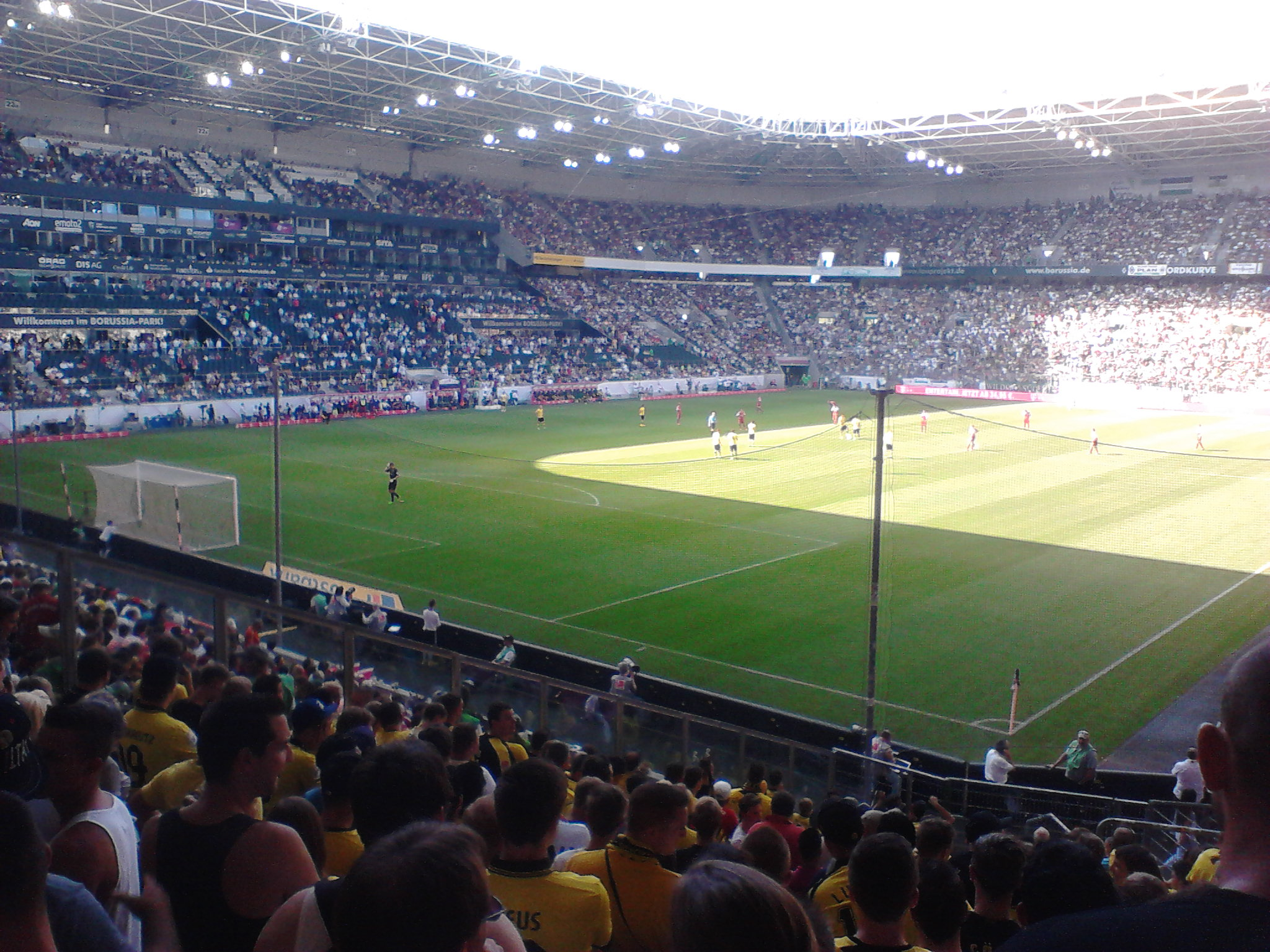
The third place play-off between Borussia Dortmund and Hamburger SV was won by the former.

==== Bracket ====
Semi-finals
20 July 2013
Borussia Mönchengladbach	1
Borussia Dortmund	0
20 July 2013
Bayern Munich	4
Hamburger SV	0

Final
21 July 2013
Borussia Mönchengladbach	1
Bayern Munich	5
Third place play-off
21 July 2013
Borussia Dortmund	1
Hamburger SV	0

==== Matches ====
20 July 2013 Semi-finals	Borussia Mönchengladbach	1–0	Borussia Dortmund	Mönchengladbach
16:45 CEST (UTC+02:00)	Daems 60' (pen.)	Report		Stadium: Stadion im Borussia-Park; Attendance: 47,125; Referee: Guido Winkmann

20 July 2013 Semi-finals	Bayern Munich	4–0	Hamburger SV	Mönchengladbach
18:30 CEST (UTC+02:00)	Boateng 12'; Mandžukić 41'; Kroos 44'; Müller 52'	Report		Stadium: Stadion im Borussia-Park; Attendance: 47,125; Referee: Christian Dingert

21 July 2013 Third place play-off	Borussia Dortmund	1–0	Hamburger SV	Mönchengladbach
16:45 CEST (UTC+02:00)	Hofmann 24'	Report		Stadium: Stadion im Borussia-Park; Attendance: 44,506; Referee: Christian Dingert

21 July 2013 Final	Borussia Mönchengladbach	1–5	Bayern Munich	Mönchengladbach
18:30 CEST (UTC+02:00)	De Jong 30' (pen.)	Report	Ribéry 17'; Lahm 23'; Thiago 26'; Robben 41'; Müller 60'	Stadium: Stadion im Borussia-Park; Attendance: 44,506; Referee: Guido Winkmann

=== 2014 Telekom Cup ===
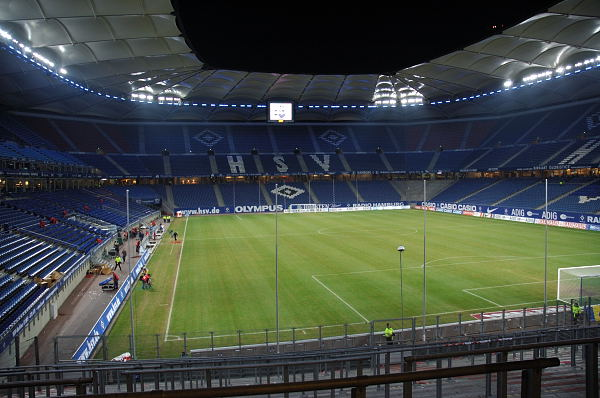
The Imtech Arena hosted the 2014 edition.

==== Description ====
On 24 April 2014, full details for the 2014 Telekom Cup were announced. It was confirmed Bayern Munich, Borussia Mönchengladbach, Hamburger SV and VfL Wolfsburg would participate in the sixth edition of the competition. It was also announced that the Imtech Arena would host the competition.

The opening semi-finals took place on 26 July, with the third place play-off and the final taking place on the following day. Matches last 30 minutes per half, rather than the usual 45. In case of a draw after 60 minutes, the match would go directly into a penalty shoot-out.

Tickets for the competition were released on 16 July.

==== Bracket ====
Semi-finals
26 July 2014
Hamburger SV	0 (5)
VfL Wolfsburg	0 (6)
26 July 2014
Bayern Munich	2 (5)
Borussia Mönchengladbach	2 (4)

Final
27 July 2014
VfL Wolfsburg	0
Bayern Munich	3
Third place play-off
27 July 2014
Hamburger SV	3
Borussia Mönchengladbach	1

==== Matches ====
26 July 2014 Semi-finals	Hamburger SV	0–0 (5–6 p)	VfL Wolfsburg	Hamburg
18:30 CEST (UTC+02:00)		Report		Stadium: Imtech Arena; Attendance: 42,000; Referee: Bastian Dankert
	Penalties
	Van der Vaart (penalty scored); Djourou (penalty scored); Stieber (penalty scored); Jiráček (penalty scored); Iličević (penalty scored); Demirbay (penalty missed)		(penalty scored) Naldo; (penalty scored) Jung; (penalty scored) Hunt; (penalty scored) Arnold; (penalty scored) Vieirinha; (penalty scored) Junior Malanda

26 July 2014 Semi-finals	Bayern Munich	2–2 (5–4 p)	Borussia Mönchengladbach	Hamburg
20:30 CEST (UTC+02:00)	Lewandowski 29'; Ribéry 34'	Report	Kruse 42' (pen.), 60' (pen.)	Stadium: Imtech Arena; Attendance: 42,000; Referee: Peter Gagelmann
	Penalties
	Lewandowski (penalty scored); Alaba (penalty scored); Badstuber (penalty scored); Rafinha (penalty missed); Højbjerg (penalty scored); Martínez (penalty scored)		(penalty scored) Nordtveit; (penalty scored) Raffael; (penalty scored) Hahn; (penalty scored) Kruse; (penalty missed) Wendt; (penalty missed) Korb

27 July 2014 Third place play-off	Hamburger SV	3–1	Borussia Mönchengladbach	Hamburg
16:30 CEST (UTC+02:00)	Zoua 3'; Van der Vaart 21'; Demirbay 53'	Report	Raffael 4'	Stadium: Imtech Arena; Attendance: 50,000; Referee: Bastian Dankert

27 July 2014 Final	VfL Wolfsburg	0–3	Bayern Munich	Hamburg
18:15 CEST (UTC+02:00)		Report	Lewandowski 4', 20'; Rode 15'	Stadium: Imtech Arena; Attendance: 50,000; Referee: Peter Gagelmann

=== 2015 Telekom Cup ===
==== Description ====
On 30 March 2015, it was confirmed that Bayern Munich, Borussia Mönchengladbach and Hamburger SV would participate, with a fourth team to be announced. The seventh edition will be held on 12 July 2015 at the Stadion im Borussia-Park. All games will be played in one day with less playing time. The fourth team to compete was decided later to be FC Augsburg. The rules changed for 2015, where a match will only last for 45 minutes instead of 60.

==== Bracket ====
Semi-finals
12 July 2015
Borussia Mönchengladbach	0 (4)
Hamburger SV	0 (5)
12 July 2015
Bayern Munich	1
FC Augsburg	2

Final
12 July 2015
Hamburger SV	2
FC Augsburg	1
Third place play-off
12 July 2015
Borussia Mönchengladbach	0 (4)
Bayern Munich	0 (3)

==== Matches ====
12 July 2015 Semi-finals	Borussia Mönchengladbach	0–0 (4–5 p)	Hamburger SV	Mönchengladbach
15:00 CEST (UTC+02:00)		Report		Stadium: Stadion im Borussia-Park; Attendance: 50,123; Referee: Guido Winkmann
	Penalties
	Stindl (penalty scored); Hahn (penalty scored); Ritter (penalty missed); Brouwers (penalty scored); Raffael (penalty scored); Elvedi (penalty missed)		(penalty scored) Holtby; (penalty scored) Lasogga; (penalty scored) Steinmann; (penalty scored) Djourou; (penalty missed) Cléber; (penalty scored) Kačar

12 July 2015 Semi-finals	Bayern Munich	1–2	FC Augsburg	Mönchengladbach
16:15 CEST (UTC+02:00)	Thiago 7'	Report	Esswein 29'; Hong 35'	Stadium: Stadion im Borussia-Park; Attendance: 50,123; Referee: Martin Thomsen

12 July 2015 Third place play-off	Borussia Mönchengladbach	0–0 (4–3 p)	Bayern Munich	Mönchengladbach
17:30 CEST (UTC+02:00)		Report		Stadium: Stadion im Borussia-Park; Attendance: 50,123; Referee: Martin Thomsen
	Penalties
	Stindl (penalty scored); Ndenge (penalty scored); Dahoud (penalty scored); Brouwers (penalty scored)		(penalty scored) Alaba; (penalty scored) Lahm; (penalty scored) Kimmich; (penalty missed) Højbjerg; (penalty missed) Benko

12 July 2015 Final	Hamburger SV	2–1	FC Augsburg	Mönchengladbach
18:45 CEST (UTC+02:00)	Gouaida 2'; Framberger 33' (o.g.)	Report	Matavž 41'	Stadium: Stadion im Borussia-Park; Attendance: 50,123; Referee: Guido Winkmann

=== 2017 Telekom Cup (January) ===
Semi-finals
14 January 2017
Fortuna Düsseldorf	0 (1)
Bayern Munich	0 (4)
14 January 2017
Borussia Mönchengladbach	0
Mainz 05	1

Final
14 January 2017
Bayern Munich	2
Mainz 05	1
Third place play-off
14 January 2017
Fortuna Düsseldorf	2
Borussia Mönchengladbach	0

=== 2017 Telekom Cup (July) ===
Semi-finals
15 July
Borussia Mönchengladbach	0 (3)
Werder Bremen	0 (5)
15 July
Bayern Munich	1
1899 Hoffenheim	0

Final
15 July
Werder Bremen	0
Bayern Munich	2
Third place play-off
15 July
Borussia Mönchengladbach	0 (5)
1899 Hoffenheim	0 (6)

=== 2019 Telekom Cup ===
Semi-finals
13 January
Fortuna Düsseldorf	0 (7)
Bayern Munich	0 (8)
13 January
Borussia Mönchengladbach	1
Hertha Berlin	0

Final
13 January
Borussia Mönchengladbach	0 (2)
Bayern Munich	0 (4)
Third place play-off
13 January
Fortuna Düsseldorf	3
Hertha BSC	1

=== 2022 Telekom Cup ===
16 July 2022 Final	1. FC Köln	1–2	AC Milan	Cologne
19:00 CEST (UTC+02:00)	Dietz 86'	Report	Giroud 16', 36'	Stadium: RheinEnergieStadion; Referee: Sascha Stegemann

=== 2025 Telekom Cup ===
7 August 2025 Final	Bayern Munich	4–0	Tottenham Hotspur	Munich
18:30 CEST (UTC+02:00)	Kane 12'; Coman 61'; Karl 75'; Kusi-Asare 80'	Report		Stadium: Allianz Arena; Attendance: 72,000; Referee: Robert Hartmann

== Results by year ==
Year	Name	Venue	Host city	First place	Second place	Third place	Fourth place
2009	T-Home Cup	Veltins-Arena	Gelsenkirchen	Hamburger SV	VfB Stuttgart	Bayern Munich	Schalke 04
2010	Liga total! Cup	Veltins-Arena	Gelsenkirchen	Schalke 04	Bayern Munich	Hamburger SV	1. FC Köln
2011	Liga total! Cup	Coface Arena	Mainz	Borussia Dortmund	Hamburger SV	Bayern Munich	Mainz 05
2012	Liga total! Cup	Imtech Arena	Hamburg	Werder Bremen	Borussia Dortmund	Bayern Munich	Hamburger SV
2013	Telekom Cup	Stadion im Borussia-Park	Mönchengladbach	Bayern Munich	Borussia Mönchengladbach	Borussia Dortmund	Hamburger SV
2014	Telekom Cup	Imtech Arena	Hamburg	Bayern Munich	VfL Wolfsburg	Hamburger SV	Borussia Mönchengladbach
2015	Telekom Cup	Borussia-Park	Mönchengladbach	Hamburger SV	FC Augsburg	Borussia Mönchengladbach	Bayern Munich
January 2017	Telekom Cup	Esprit Arena	Düsseldorf	Bayern Munich	Mainz 05	Fortuna Düsseldorf	Borussia Mönchengladbach
July 2017	Telekom Cup	Borussia-Park	Mönchengladbach	Bayern Munich	Werder Bremen	TSG Hoffenheim	Borussia Mönchengladbach
2019	Telekom Cup	Merkur Spiel-Arena	Düsseldorf	Bayern Munich	Borussia Mönchengladbach	Fortuna Düsseldorf	Hertha BSC
2022	Telekom Cup	RheinEnergieStadion	Cologne	(Italy) AC Milan	1. FC Köln	—N/a	

== Statistics ==
=== Performance by team ===
Rank	Team	Appearances	First place	Second place	Third place	Fourth place
1	Bayern Munich	10	6 (2013, 2014, January 2017, July 2017, 2019, 2025)	1 (2010)	3 (2009, 2011, 2012)	1 (2015)
2	Hamburger SV	7	2 (2009, 2015)	1 (2011)	2 (2010, 2014)	2 (2012, 2013)
3	Borussia Dortmund	3	1 (2011)	1 (2012)	1 (2013)	–
4	Werder Bremen	2	1 (2012)	1 (July 2017)	–	–
5	Schalke 04	2	1 (2010)	–	–	1 (2009)
6	Milan	1	1 (2022)	–	–	–
7	Borussia Mönchengladbach	6	–	2 (2013, 2019)	1 (2015)	3 (2014, January 2017, July 2017)
8	1. FC Köln	2	–	1 (2022)	–	1 (2010)
8	Mainz 05	2	–	1 (January 2017)	–	1 (2011)
8	FC Augsburg	1	–	1 (2015)	–	–
8	VfB Stuttgart	1	–	1 (2009)	–	–
8	VfL Wolfsburg	1	–	1 (2014)	–	–
12	Fortuna Düsseldorf	2	–	–	2 (January 2017, 2019)	–
12	1899 Hoffenheim	1	–	–	1 (July 2017)	–
13	Hertha BSC	1	–	–	–	1 (2019)

=== Top goalscorers ===
Rank	Player	Team(s)	Goals
1	(Poland) Robert Lewandowski	Borussia Dortmund / Bayern Munich	6
2	(Germany) Toni Kroos	Bayern Munich	3
2	(Germany) Thomas Müller	Bayern Munich	3
2	(France) Franck Ribéry	Bayern Munich	3
2	(South Korea) Son Heung-min	Hamburger SV	3
6	(Brazil) Edu	Schalke 04	2
6	(Germany) Niclas Füllkrug	Werder Bremen	2
6	(France) Olivier Giroud	Milan	2
6	(Germany) Max Kruse	Borussia Mönchengladbach	2
6	(Germany) Nils Petersen	Bayern Munich / Werder Bremen	2
6	(Spain) Raúl	Schalke 04	2
6	(Spain) Thiago	Bayern Munich	2
6	(Netherlands) Ruud van Nistelrooy	Hamburger SV	2
