= 2007–08 Karlsruher SC season =

Karlsruher SC
2007–08 season
- Manager: Edmund Becker
- Stadium: Wildparkstadion
- Bundesliga: 11th
- DFB-Pokal: Second round

During the 2007–08 German football season, Karlsruher SC competed in the Bundesliga.

== Season summary ==
Following promotion, Karlsruher SC secured safety with an 11th place.

== First-team squad ==
Squad at end of season

Note: Flags indicate national team as defined under FIFA eligibility rules; some limited exceptions apply. Players may hold more than one non-FIFA nationality.

No.	Pos.	Nation	Player
1	GK	GER	Markus Miller
2	DF	GER	Christopher Reinhard
3	DF	GER	Maik Franz
4	MF	GHA	Godfried Aduobe
5	DF	SUI	Mario Eggimann (captain)
6	DF	RSA	Bradley Carnell
7	FW	GER	Christian Timm
8	MF	GER	Timo Staffeldt
9	FW	ALB	Edmond Kapllani
10	MF	GER	Massimilian Porcello
13	MF	GER	Michael Mutzel
14	GK	FRA	Jean-François Kornetzky
16	DF	GER	Martin Stoll
17	FW	AUS	Joshua Kennedy

No.	Pos.	Nation	Player
18	FW	GER	Sebastian Freis
19	DF	GER	Stefan Buck
20	FW	GEO	Aleksandr Iashvili
21	DF	GER	Christian Eichner
22	DF	GER	Daniel Brosinski
23	DF	GER	Florian Dick
24	DF	GER	Sebastian Langkamp
25	MF	GER	Sebastian Fischer
26	DF	GER	Fnan Tewelde
28	FW	GER	Lars Stindl
29	GK	GER	Thomas Unger
30	MF	HUN	Tamás Hajnal
77	DF	GER	Andreas Görlitz (on loan from Bayern Munich)

=== Left club during season ===
Note: Flags indicate national team as defined under FIFA eligibility rules; some limited exceptions apply. Players may hold more than one non-FIFA nationality.

No. / Pos. / Nation / Player; 11 / FW / MNE / Sanibal Orahovac (to Erzgebirge Aue)	No. / Pos. / Nation / Player; 28 / MF / GER / Benjamin Barg (to Sandhausen)
