= Andreas Görlitz =

German footballer

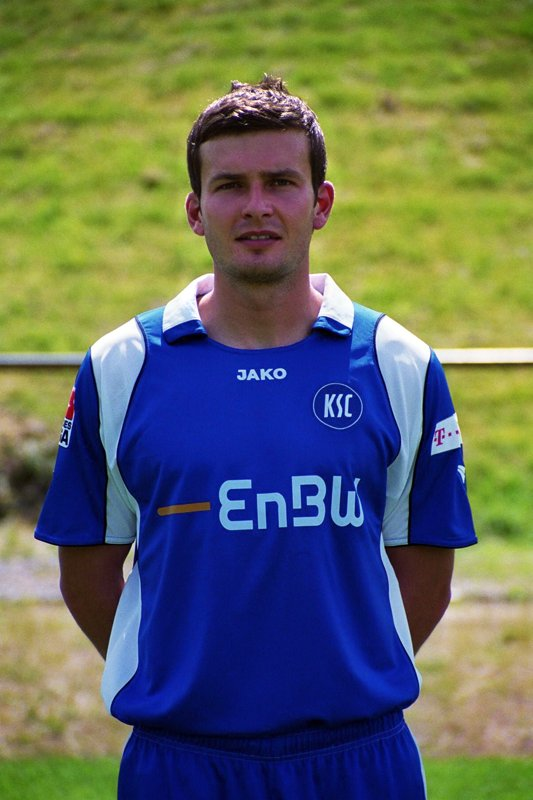
- Görlitz with Karlsruher SC in 2007

Personal information
- Date of birth: 31 January 1982 (age 44)
- Place of birth: Weilheim, West Germany
- Height: 1.79 m (5 ft 10 in)
- Position: Right-back

Youth career
- 1989–1996: TSV Rott/Lech
- 1996–2000: 1860 Munich

Senior career*
Years	Team	Apps	(Gls)
2000–2003	1860 Munich II	59	(8)
2002–2004	1860 Munich	37	(1)
2004–2010	Bayern Munich	18	(0)
2005–2010	Bayern Munich II	21	(0)
2007–2009	→ Karlsruher SC (loan)	49	(0)
2010–2013	FC Ingolstadt 04	63	(1)
2012–2014	→ FC Ingolstadt 04 II	2	(0)
2014	San Jose Earthquakes	3	(0)
Total		252	(10)

International career
2003–2004	Germany U21	9	(0)
2004	Germany	2	(0)
- * Club domestic league appearances and goals

Andreas Görlitz (German pronunciation: [anˈdʁeːas ˈɡœʁlɪts]; born 31 January 1982) is a German former professional footballer who played as a right-back.

== Club career ==
Born in Weilheim in Oberbayern, Bavaria, West Germany, Görlitz began his professional career as a midfielder with TSV 1860 Munich, by then in the Bundesliga; his first match came on 10 February 2002, in a 2–1 loss at 1. FC Nürnberg, but he could only amass a further four league games in his first two seasons combined.

In the 2003–04 season, Görlitz made the transition to defender, and appeared in 32 matches for TSV, scoring his first professional goal on 27 March 2004, at Eintracht Frankfurt, through a header (3–0 triumph), as his side was finally relegated, after ranking 17th.

Görlitz signed with TSV neighbours FC Bayern Munich in the 2004 summer. He even started some matches in the new season but, following an injury in a UEFA Champions League contest against Juventus FC, on 3 November, spent almost two years in the sidelines.

In the summer of 2007, it was announced that Görlitz would join newly promoted Karlsruher SC, on loan for the 2007–08 season. The player only missed three league matches and his club finished 11th, well clear from relegation.

On 9 May 2008, the loan deal was extended for another season. Following his second year, in which he featured significantly less, also suffering another relegation, Görlitz returned to Bayern, to play through the final year in his contract. For the third consecutive season at the club, he was often demoted to the reserve squad.

On 4 March 2014, Görlitz signed a contract with the San Jose Earthquakes of Major League Soccer. After an injury limited his season to three league matches, Görlitz was released by San Jose at the end of their 2014 season.

== International career ==
Shortly after signing for Bayern, Görlitz made his debut for the Germany national team, appearing in the last five minutes of the 1–1 friendly with Brazil, on 8 September 2004; the following month, he assisted veteran Thomas Brdarić as the striker closed the score at 2–0, in another exhibition game, this time against Iran. These two caps within a month were his only appearances in the German elite squad until the end of his career.

== Music career ==
While recovering from a football injury, Görlitz learned to play guitar. After he retired from football, he formed a band, Room77.

== Career statistics ==
Appearances and goals by club, season and competition
Club	Season	League			Cup		Continental		Other		Total		Ref.
Club	Season	League	Apps	Goals	Apps	Goals	Apps	Goals	Apps	Goals	Apps	Goals	Ref.
1860 Munich II	2000–01	Regionalliga Süd	7	1	—		—		—		7	1	
1860 Munich II	2001–02				—		—		—				
1860 Munich II	2002–03				—		—		—				
1860 Munich II	Total		7	1	0	0	0	0	0	0	7	1	—
1860 Munich	2001–02	Bundesliga	3	0	0	0	—		—		3	0	
1860 Munich	2002–03	Bundesliga	2	0	0	0	—		—		2	0	
1860 Munich	2003–04	Bundesliga	32	1	2	0	—		—		34	1	
1860 Munich	Total		37	1	2	0	0	0	0	0	39	1	—
Bayern Munich	2004–05	Bundesliga	7	0	1	0	2	0	1 (Note: Appearances in DFL-Ligapokal)	0	11	0	
Bayern Munich	2006–07	Bundesliga	11	0	0	0	2	0	0	0	13	0	
Bayern Munich	2009–10	Bundesliga	0	0	1	0	0	0	—		1	0	
Bayern Munich	Total		18	0	2	0	4	0	1	0	25	0	—
Bayern Munich II	2004–05	Regionalliga Süd	0	0	1	0	—		—		1	0	
Bayern Munich II	2005–06	Regionalliga Süd	1	0	—		—		—		1	0	
Bayern Munich II	2006–07	Regionalliga Süd	15	0	—		—		—		15	0	
Bayern Munich II	2009–10	3. Liga	4	0	—		—		—		4	0	
Bayern Munich II	Total		20	0	1	0	0	0	0	0	21	0	—
Karlsruher SC (loan)	2007–08	Bundesliga	31	0	2	0	—		1	0	34	0	
Karlsruher SC (loan)	2008–09	Bundesliga	18	0	1	0	—		—		19	0	
Karlsruher SC (loan)	Total		49	0	3	0	0	0	1	0	53	0	—
FC Ingolstadt	2010–11	2. Bundesliga	27	0	2	0	—		—		29	0	
FC Ingolstadt	2011–12	2. Bundesliga	28	1	1	0	—		—		29	1	
FC Ingolstadt	2012–13	2. Bundesliga	8	0	0	0	—		—		8	0	
FC Ingolstadt	Total		63	1	3	0	0	0	0	0	66	1	—
FC Ingolstadt II	2012–13	Regionalliga Bayern	2	1	—		—		—				
San Jose Earthquakes	2014	MLS	3	0	0	0	0	0	—		3	0	
Career total			198	4	11	0	4	0	2	0	215	4	—

== Honours ==
Bayern Munich

- Bundesliga: 2004–05, 2005–06, 2009–10
- DFB-Pokal: 2004–05, 2005–06, 2009–10
- UEFA Champions League runner-up: 2009–10
