= Hand clasping =

Joining one's hands with fingers interlaced

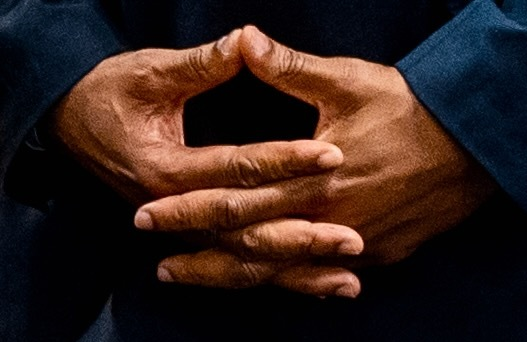
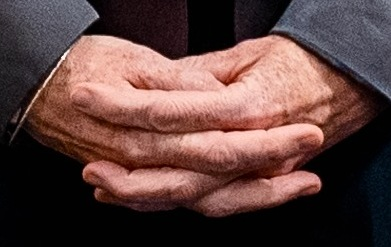
R-phenotype hand clasping (left), with the right hand on top, and L-phenotype hand clasping, with the left hand on top.

Hand clasping or hand folding is the interlocking of the fingers of one hand with the fingers of another. It is commonly used to express authority above or respect for others. It is also common to clasp the hands during prayer.

== Phenotypical definition ==
When clasping the hands, a person tends to interlace the fingers in one of two ways. People who hold the fingers of the right hand above the left fingers are classified as phenotype R (right), while those who hold the fingers of the left hand above those of the right are phenotype L (left).

Although some people do not prefer one type of hand clasping, most do. Once adopted, hand clasping tends to be consistent throughout life. When an individual attempts to clasp the hands in the opposite configuration from the usual one, that person may feel a sense that something is out of the ordinary.

Lai and Walsh (1965) suspect that genetic factors are important in determining these characteristics. They looked at a sample of 18 families.

Based on the comparison of a series of monozygotic and dizygotic twins, Freire-Maia (1961) concluded that the preference in the type of hand clasping was affected by certain genetic factors, and (perhaps) to a significant extent.

Falk and Ayala (1971) found a significant correlation between parent-offspring and for this feature suggested model polygenic inheritance.

Martin (1975) presented the results of studies of twins and found that genetic factors are still determining the phenotypic expression of this trait.

Reiss (1999) found that 55% of the population belongs to the phenotype L, and 44% have a "right type" clasping; the remaining 1% did not care.

In support of the hypothesis about the significant influence of genetic factors on the phenotypic expression of the extreme dimorphism clearly demarcated by the data on a very wide range of variation in the frequency of phenotypes tested parts of the world's population.

=== R phenotype distribution ===
Population	N	R (%)	References
Belgium	644	48.1	Leguebe (1967)
Bosnia and Herzegovina	10,073	55.1	Hadžiselimović et al. (1979)
Bulgaria	?	70.1	Boev, Todorov (1970)
Greece	?	81.2	Pelecanos (1969)
Poland	771	48.0	Wolanski et al. (1973)
Scotland	598	60.0	Lutz (1908)
Serbia: Užice	2,217	54.0	Hadžiselimović et al.(1979)
Serbia: Voivodina	2,686	51.9	Gavrilović, Božić (1972)
Spain	486	52.1	Pons (1961)
Sweden	981	52.1	Beckman, Elston (1962)

== Psychological understanding ==
=== Hand wringing ===
Hand wringing is a gesture characterized by repeatedly rubbing or twisting one's hands together, often as a sign of distress or nervousness, while folding or clasping. Hand wringing has been studied in psychology to understand its underlying motivations and implications for mental well-being, of which include nonverbal communication and self-soothing behavior. It is often attributed to physical, cognitive, and mental conditions.

The act of hand wringing, along other motor actions, has been observed common in people with Rett syndrome, a genetic brain disorder, for decades. In a study investigating stereotypical hand movements in individuals with the syndrome, hand wringing was identified as one of the most prevalent stereotypies, observed in approximately 60% of subjects. It found that hand wringing tended to be more prevalent in women aged 19 years or older. Additionally, associations were noted between specific mutations and hand-wringing behavior, with certain mutations being more commonly associated with this stereotypical movement. However, there were no clear relationships between hand-wringing and the severity of mutations.

Hand wringing is also common in people with autism and obsessive-compulsive disorder.

Some studies suggest that when attempting to mitigate certain behaviors through interventions like response blocking, unintended consequences may arise. For instance, in the treatment of stereotypic behavior such as head and tooth tapping, blocking these behaviors may inadvertently lead to an increase in other stereotypic responses, such as hand wringing. This collateral effect, observed in individuals diagnosed with autism, indicates that the reduction in the targeted behavior may result in the emergence or exacerbation of alternative behaviors.

== In religion ==
Hand clasping holds significance in several religious and spiritual practices around the world, often symbolizing different aspects of faith. While not explicitly addressed in religious texts or practices, individuals may engage in the behavior during moments of spiritual reflection such as prayer or meditation.

=== Christianity ===
In Christianity, hand clasping can be seen during prayer or as a gesture of fellowship and unity among believers. It often symbolizes solidarity in faith and mutual support within the community. In some Christian ceremonies, such as weddings or baptisms, hand clasping may signify the joining of two individuals or families in a sacred bond.

=== Buddhism ===
Buddhism employs hand gestures, or mudras, as part of spiritual practice. Some of which include clasped hands, such as ushas mudra, symbolizing reverence, gratitude, and mindfulness. Hand clasping may also be used in meditation as a means of focusing on one's intention and connecting with inner peace.

=== Mandaeism ===
In Mandaeism, the Mandaic term kushta (which also means 'truth') refers to a sacred handclasp between two people that is used during Mandaean rituals such as the masbuta, masiqta, and priestly initiation ceremonies.

== See also ==
- Arm folding
- Hand
