= Holger Badstuber =

German association football player (born 1989)

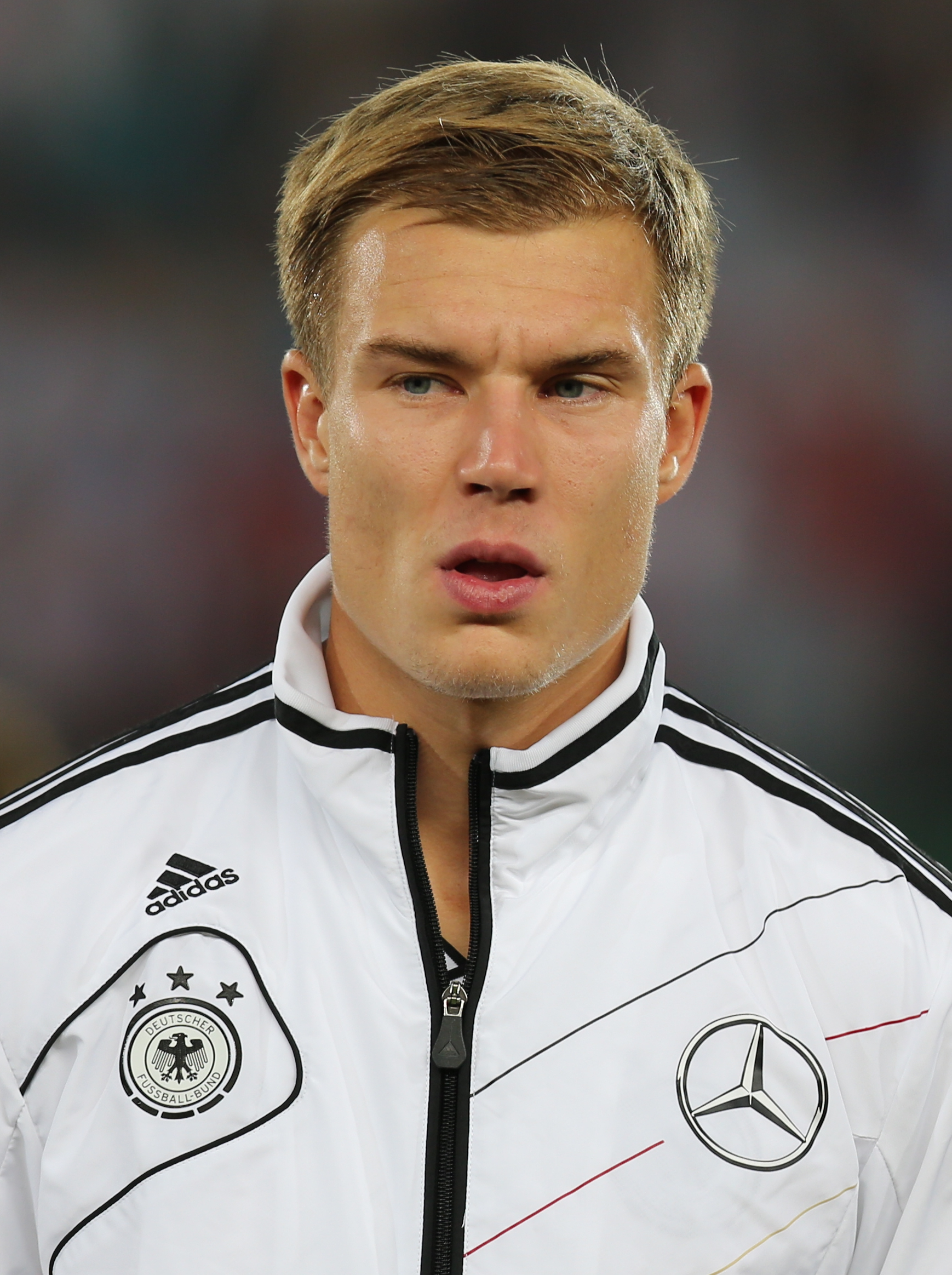
- Badstuber with Germany in 2012

Personal information
- Full name: Holger Felix Badstuber
- Date of birth: 13 March 1989 (age 37)
- Place of birth: Memmingen, West Germany
- Height: 1.90 m (6 ft 3 in)
- Position: Centre-back

Youth career
- 1994–2000: TSV Rot an der Rot 1890
- 2000–2002: VfB Stuttgart
- 2002–2007: Bayern Munich

Senior career*
Years	Team	Apps	(Gls)
2007–2009	Bayern Munich II	56	(7)
2009–2017	Bayern Munich	119	(1)
2017	→ Schalke 04 (loan)	10	(0)
2017–2020	VfB Stuttgart	56	(4)
2020–2021	VfB Stuttgart II	28	(0)
2021	FC Luzern	14	(0)
Total		283	(12)

International career
2007–2008	Germany U19	2	(0)
2008	Germany U20	3	(0)
2009–2010	Germany U21	8	(2)
2010–2015	Germany	31	(1)
Medal record
Men's football
Representing Germany
FIFA World Cup
Bronze medal – third place	2010	Team
UEFA European Championship
Bronze medal – third place	2012	Team
- * Club domestic league appearances and goals

Holger Felix Badstuber (born 13 March 1989) is a German former professional footballer who primarily played as a centre-back.

Badstuber made his debut in the Bundesliga for Bayern Munich in the 2009–10 season at the age of 19. He played nearly every game that year and helped the club win the league and cup double and reached the UEFA Champions League final the same year, before eventually earning a call up to the Germany national team for the World Cup in 2010 and later the Euro 2012. He won over 30 caps for Germany. Former Bayern Munich coach Louis van Gaal stated in 2010 that Badstuber was the best left-footed defender in Germany.

== Club career ==
=== Bayern Munich ===
==== Youth career, reserve team, and first team debut ====
From 2002 to 2007, Badstuber progressed through the youth setup at Bayern Munich. He played for Bayern's reserve team before signing professional terms in July 2009. He had scored four goals in 23 appearances in the Regionalliga Süd during the 2007–08 season and three goals in 32 appearances in the 3. Liga during the 2008–09 season. Badstuber, along with teammate Thomas Müller, was an unused substitute in a number of first-team matches in the 2008–09 season. He made his debut in the first league game of the 2009–10 season, against 1899 Hoffenheim and was a regular in defense. He scored his first senior goal, a powerful free kick, against Borussia Mönchengladbach on 4 December 2009. A centre-back by trade, he played out of position at left back. The youngster impressed in his first season, and started all league games in the 2009–10 domestic campaign.

On 4 February 2010, Bayern Munich announced that Badstuber had signed a new contract that would keep him at the club until 2014. He finished the 2009–10 season with a goal in 49 appearances.

==== 2010–12 ====
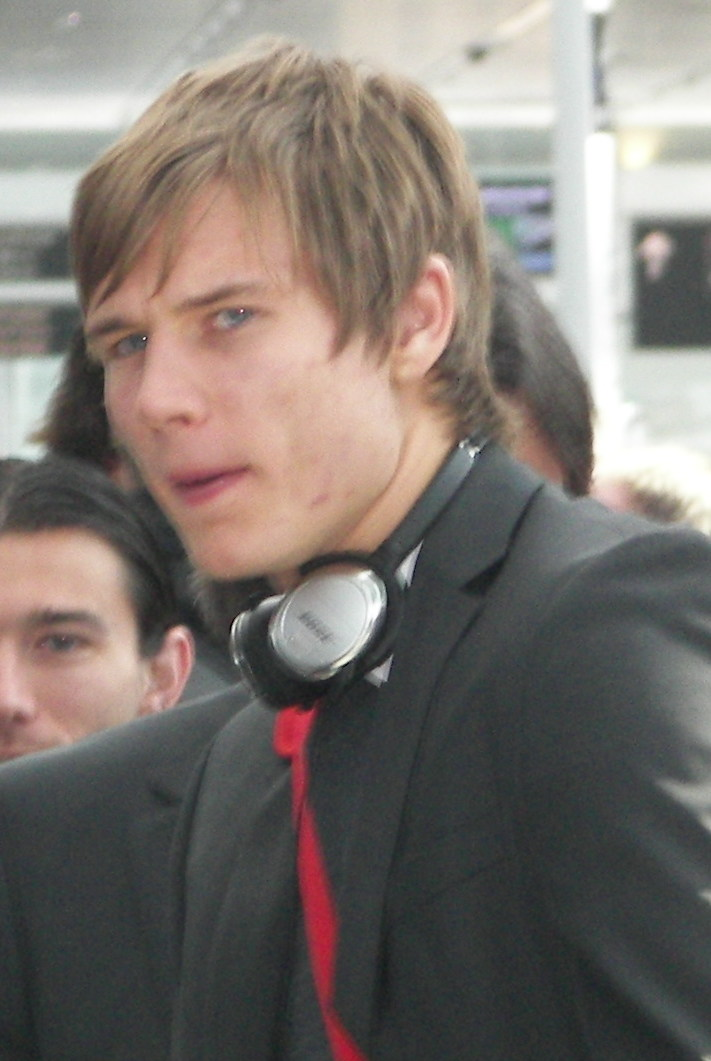
Badstuber in 2010

Throughout the 2010–11 season he made 32 appearances in all competitions for Bayern. During the 2010–11 season, Badstuber endured a tumultuous relationship with coach Louis van Gaal, who despite stating that he has high trust in Badstuber, strongly criticized him following a number of poor performances. As a result of his poor form he found himself out of the starting eleven several times throughout the season. With the arrival of Jupp Heynckes, Badstuber was reinstated at the left of central defense, where he enjoyed a fruitful relationship with fellow international Jérôme Boateng, and helped Bayern maintain 11 clean sheets in a row. Additionally, he was integral to the Bayern Munich defensive line which lead the team to the 2012 UEFA Champions League Final, beating Real Madrid, Napoli and Manchester City along the way, before losing out to English side Chelsea in the final. He made 50 appearances across all competitions during the 2011–12 season.

==== 2013–16 ====
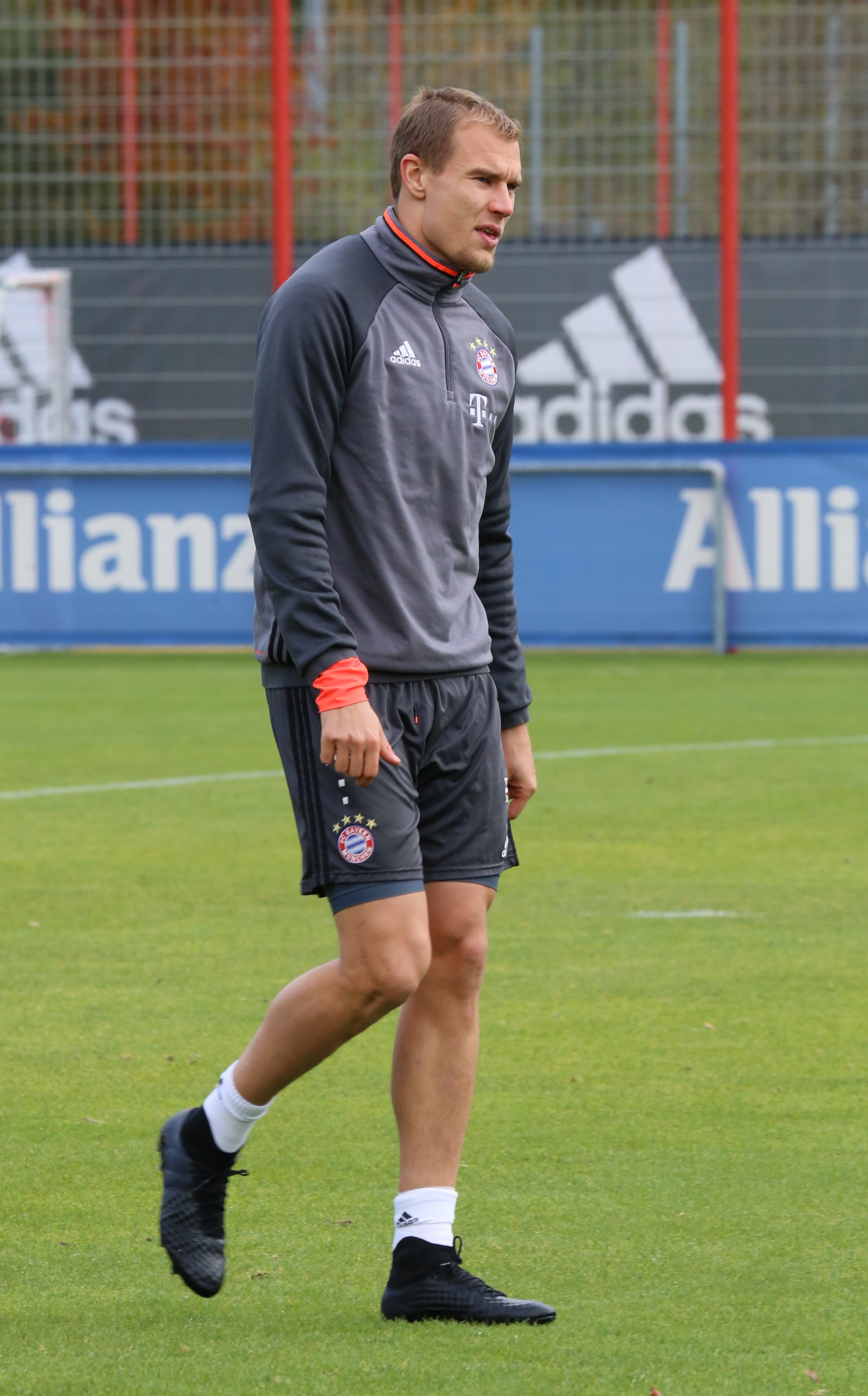
Badstuber during training with Bayern Munich in 2016

On 3 February 2013, Badstuber signed a contract extension with Bayern, keeping him at the club until 2017.

Badstuber injured his anterior cruciate ligament against Borussia Dortmund on 1 December 2012 and re–injured it on 19 May 2013, missing the entire 2013–14 season. He had played in 18 matches up until the injury during the 2012–13 season. He returned to first–team training on 5 May 2014 and played in his first match since his injury on 18 July 2014 in a friendly match against FC Memmingen, which Bayern won 3–0. It had been 594 days since the injury.

Badstuber began the 2014–15 season as a starting player in Bayern's first three Bundesliga fixtures. However, a thigh injury sustained against VfB Stuttgart on 13 September kept him out for the rest of the year. He returned to the starting line-up for an 8–0 defeat of Hamburger SV on 14 February 2015 and re-established himself as a first choice player in Pep Guardiola's Bayern team. On 11 March 2015, Badstuber scored a goal in the 63rd minute in a Champions League match against Shakhtar Donetsk in a 7–0 win. This was his first goal since December 2009 and also his first start in Champions League since 20 November 2012 against Valencia. It was announced on 23 April 2015 that Badstuber had ruptured his quadriceps muscle in a 6–1 Champions League quarter-final second leg win against Porto and was ruled out for the rest of the season. He finished the 2014–15 season with 16 appearances. He finished the 2015–16 season with nine appearances.

==== Loan to Schalke ====
On 10 January 2017, Badstuber joined Schalke 04 on loan until the end of the 2016–17 Bundesliga season. On the same day, it was reported that Badstuber had signed a contract extension with Bayern Munich lasting until 2018, although the club would refute this later. In the first half of the season, Badstuber had made only one Bundesliga appearance, one DFB-Pokal appearance, and one Champions League appearance for Bayern prior to the loan.

Badstuber made his debut for the Königsblauen on 4 February 2017 against his parent club, playing 59 minutes as Bayern were held to a 1–1 draw in Munich. On 1 March 2017, Badstuber was sent off for two yellow card offences on his second return to the Allianz Arena as Schalke lost 3–0 to Bayern in the quarter-final of the DFB-Pokal. On 11 May 2017, Schalke announced they would not be signing Badstuber on a permanent deal after his loan. The following day, 12 May 2017, Bayern Munich released a statement claiming that they had not extended his contract and his time with the club would end at the conclusion of his loan spell.

=== VfB Stuttgart ===
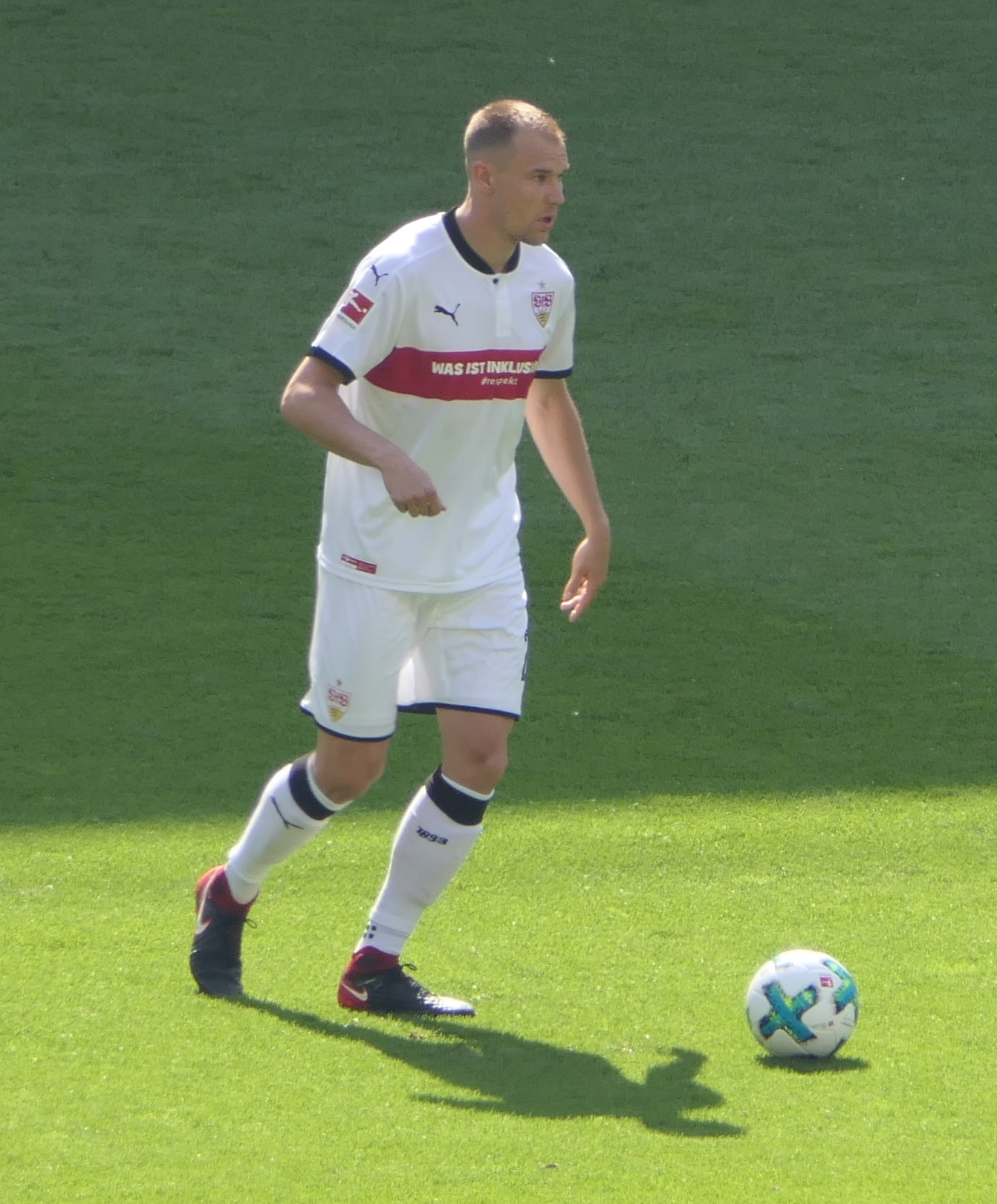
Badstuber playing for Stuttgart in 2018

On 4 August 2017, a few weeks after being released by Bayern Munich, Badstuber announced his return to VfB Stuttgart, the club for whom he played as a young teenager, on a free transfer. He finished the 2017–18 season with two goals in 28 appearances.

On 10 July 2018, Badstuber extended his contract with Stuttgart until June 2021.

=== FC Luzern ===
On 12 July 2021, Badstuber signed with Swiss club FC Luzern. On 16 December 2021, Badstuber and FC Luzern came to a mutual agreement to terminate the contract.

=== Retirement ===
On 5 September 2022, Badstuber announced his retirement from football. Overall he played almost 200 matches in the first two levels of the German league pyramid and the Swiss top-flight.

== International career ==
=== 2010 World Cup ===
He was first called up to the senior team as part of the provisional squad for the 2010 World Cup. He made his debut in a warm-up match against Hungary on 29 May coming on as a substitute for Arne Friedrich, and was for the first time in the starting lineup in the next game against Bosnia and Herzegovina, the last friendly prior to the World Cup. Badstuber was then selected in Germany's 23-man squad for the World Cup finals in South Africa on 1 June, and being handed the squad number 14 shirt by coach Joachim Löw. He started in Germany's opening group game against Australia at the Durban Stadium, playing the full 90 minutes at left-back and helping the team to a 4–0 victory, it was only his third match in the Germany jersey. Badstuber then started the next group game against Serbia on 18 June 2010 in Port Elizabeth at the Nelson Mandela Bay Stadium. He played 77 minutes, prior to being substituted for fellow Bayern teammate Mario Gómez. He was criticised for his performance and lost his leftback position in the starting lineup to Jérôme Boateng for the rest of the tournament, the 1–0 loss against the Serbs was – so far – the only match in which Badstuber played and Germany lost.

=== Euro 2012 ===
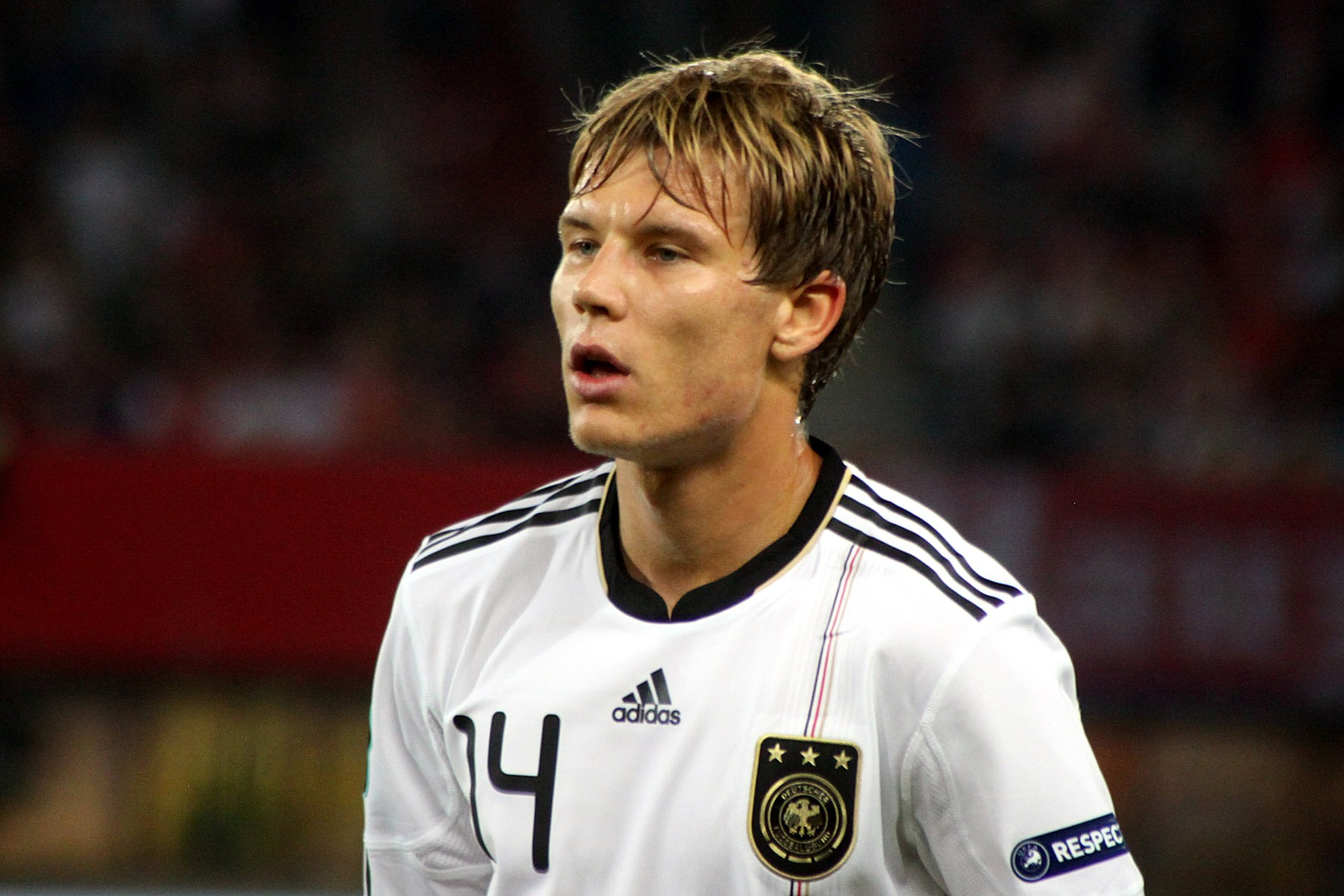
Badstuber with Germany in 2011

After the erratic World Cup, Badstuber improved his performances with consistency and established himself as a starting lineup defender in Löw's team. He helped Germany to win all ten matches of the Mannschaft's qualification campaign for Euro 2012 to top group A by playing nine out of a possible ten matches, he was only spared in the – for qualification irrelevant – last match against Belgium. During the campaign Badstuber scored his first goal, the 5–1 against Azerbaijan, he headed home a corner kick by Mesut Özil. In a friendly 3–3 draw on 11 November 2011 against Ukraine, in the international inauguration match of the new Kyiv Olympic Stadion, Löw's experimental formation featured only three defenders, Badstuber was as named the single centre-back. This was interpreted as a signal that out of many possible candidates, Badstuber had established himself as Löw's most important player in Germany's central defense. Badstuber started the first game for Germany in UEFA Euro 2012 helping the team to a clean sheet against Portugal in which the Germans won 1–0.

Due to the fact that Badstuber was injured in December 2012 and only returned to training late during the 2013–14 season, he was not called up for the final 2014 World Cup squad.

=== Euro 2016 ===
On 19 March 2015, Badstuber was called up to the national team for a friendly match against Australia and a Euro 2016 qualifier against Georgia. He played against Australia on 25 March 2015. This was his first international match since his injury. He had last played in a 4–4 draw against Sweden. Badstuber did not fly to Georgia for the European qualifier because of a problem with the hip flexor and later was not included to Euro 2016. In the end the match against the Australians became his final international match.

== Career statistics ==
=== Club ===
Appearances and goals by club, season and competition
Club	Season	League			National cup (Note: Includes DFB-Pokal and Swiss Cup)		Continental (Note: Includes UEFA Champions League and UEFA Europa Conference League qualifiers)		Other (Note: Includes German Super Cup)		Total		Ref.
Club	Season	Division	Apps	Goals	Apps	Goals	Apps	Goals	Apps	Goals	Apps	Goals	Ref.
Bayern Munich II	2007–08	Regionalliga Süd	23	4	—		—		—		23	4	
Bayern Munich II	2008–09	3. Liga	32	3	—		—		—		32	3	
Bayern Munich II	2016–17	Regionalliga Bayern	1	0	—		—		—		1	0	
Bayern Munich II	Total		56	7	—		—		—		56	7	—
Bayern Munich	2009–10	Bundesliga	33	1	4	0	12	0	—		49	1	
Bayern Munich	2010–11	Bundesliga	23	0	3	0	5	0	1	0	32	0	
Bayern Munich	2011–12	Bundesliga	33	0	5	0	12	0	—		50	0	
Bayern Munich	2012–13	Bundesliga	12	0	1	0	4	0	1	0	18	0	
Bayern Munich	2013–14	Bundesliga	0	0	0	0	0	0	0	0	0	0	
Bayern Munich	2014–15	Bundesliga	10	0	2	0	4	1	0	0	16	1	
Bayern Munich	2015–16	Bundesliga	7	0	1	0	1	0	0	0	9	0	
Bayern Munich	2016–17	Bundesliga	1	0	1	0	1	0	0	0	3	0	
Bayern Munich	Total		119	1	17	0	39	1	2	0	178	2	—
Schalke 04 (loan)	2016–17	Bundesliga	10	0	1	0	1	0	—		12	0	
VfB Stuttgart	2017–18	Bundesliga	27	2	1	0	—		—		28	2	
VfB Stuttgart	2018–19	Bundesliga	10	0	2	0	—		1	0	13	0	
VfB Stuttgart	2019–20	2. Bundesliga	19	2	2	0	—		—		21	2	
VfB Stuttgart	Total		56	4	5	0	—		1	0	62	3	—
VfB Stuttgart II	2020–21	Regionalliga Südwest	28	0	—		—		—		28	0	
FC Luzern	2021–22	Swiss Super League	14	0	3	0	1	0	—		18	0	
Career total			283	12	26	0	41	1	3	0	353	13	—

=== International ===
Scores and results list Germany's goal tally first, score column indicates score after each Badstuber goal.

List of international goals scored by Holger Badstuber
No.	Date	Venue	Opponent	Score	Result	Competition
1	7 September 2010	RheinEnergieStadion, Cologne, Germany	Azerbaijan	5–1	6–1	UEFA Euro 2012 qualification

== Honours ==
Bayern Munich

- Bundesliga: 2009–10, 2012–13, 2013–14, 2014–15, 2015–16
- DFB-Pokal: 2009–10, 2012–13, 2013–14, 2015–16
- DFL-Supercup: 2010, 2012, 2016
- UEFA Champions League: 2012–13
- UEFA Super Cup: 2013
- FIFA Club World Cup: 2013

Germany

- FIFA World Cup third place: 2010
