= Arm folding =

Method of crossing arms

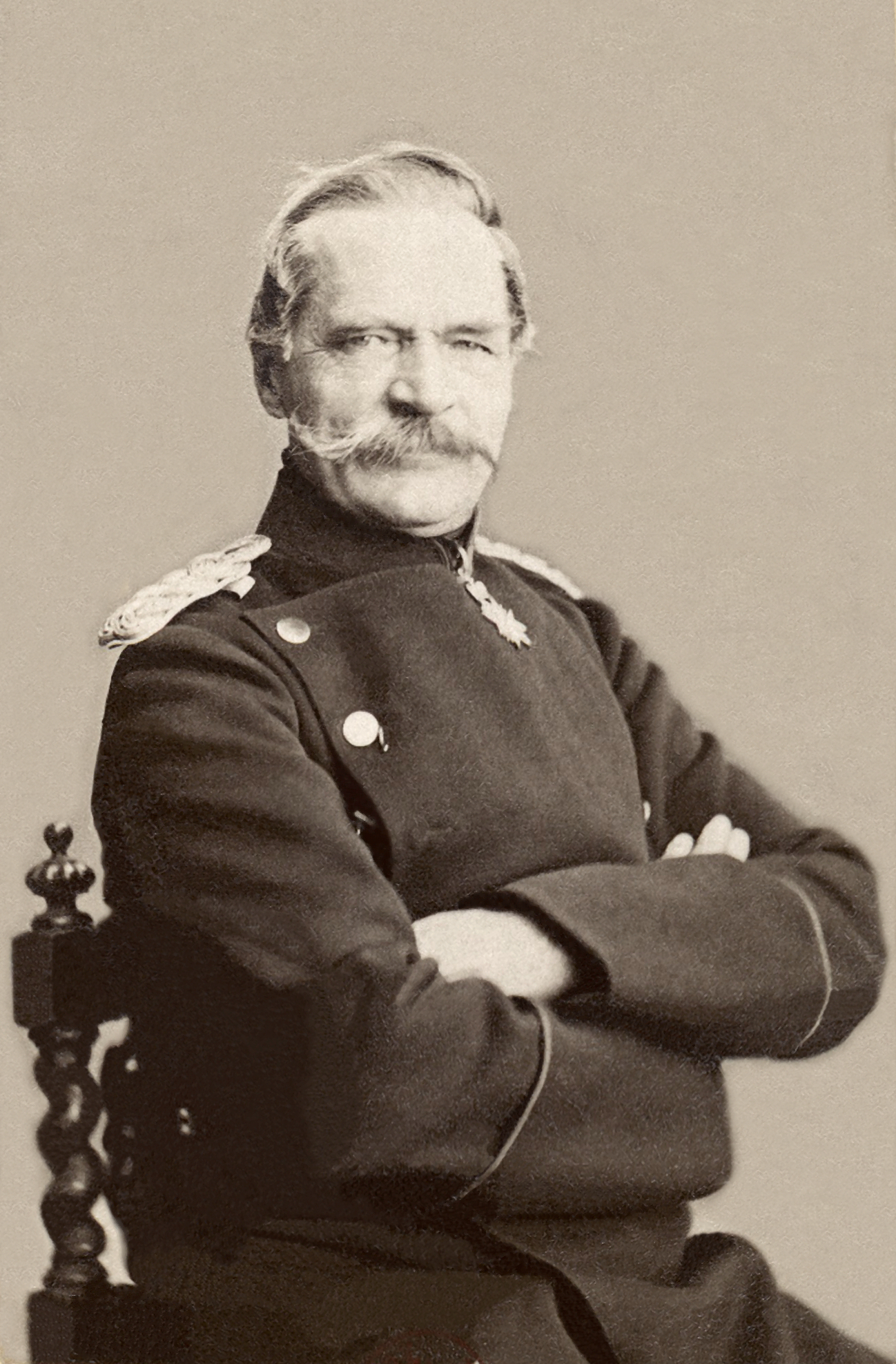
Arms crossed left over right (phenotype L)

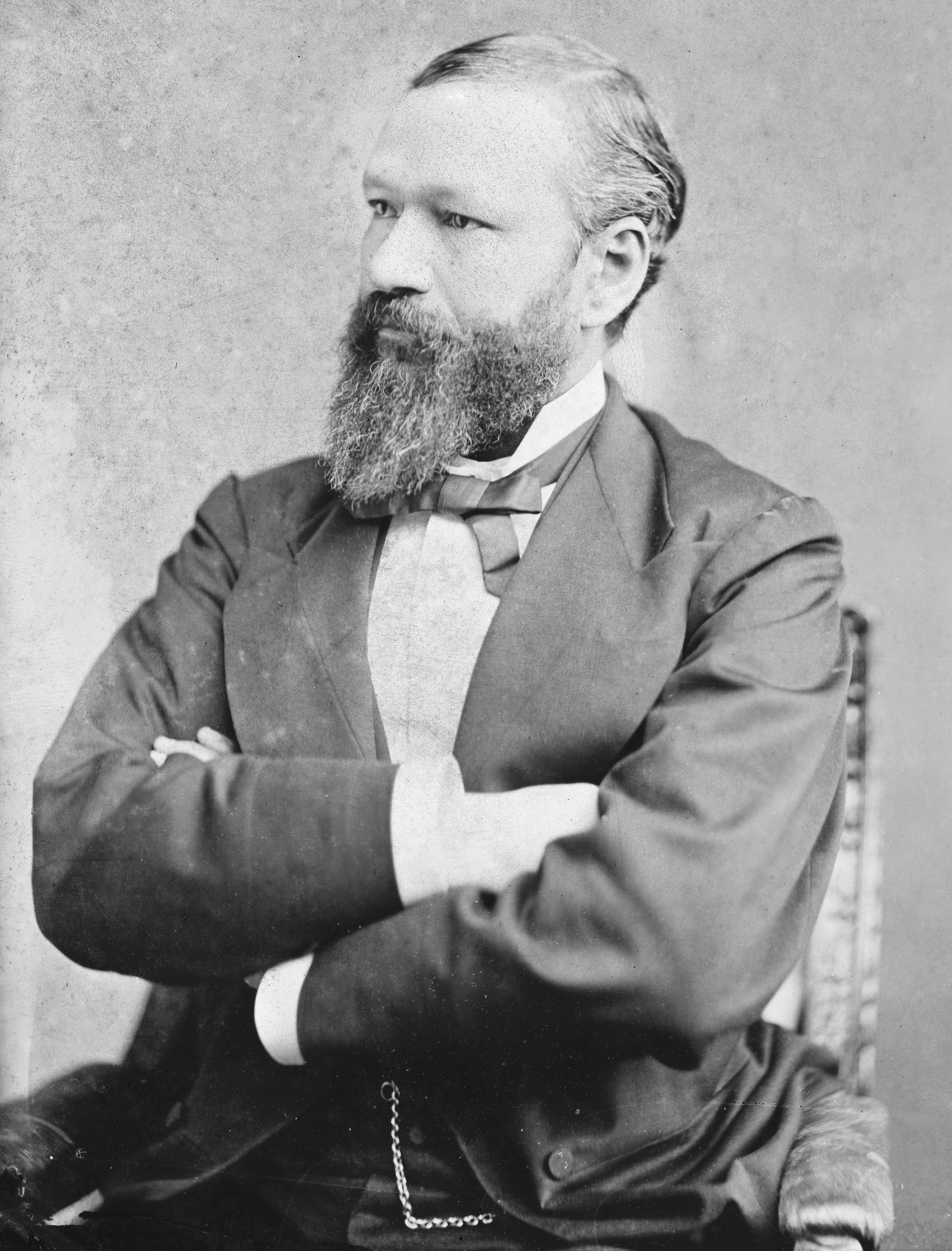
Arms crossed right over left (phenotype R)

The manner in which a person folds their arms is a dynamic morphological demonstration of two alternative phenotypes. Once adopted, manner of arms folding across the chest does not change throughout the lifetime and persons easily give up the unusual folding position, most commonly at the first attempt.

If the right arm is folded above the left forearm, the phenotype is characterised as R (right; the right type), and in the opposite case, i.e. if the left arm is positioned above the right, it is the phenotype L (left; left-type).

It has been shown that the phenotypes of these properties are distributed independently with left-handed and right-handed people.

== Factors and history ==
Falk and Ayala (1971) found that variations in arm folding are largely inherited, but these variations are not governed by existing Mendelian models. In this regard, Ferronato et al. (1974) found no significant correlation between parents and children. Individual type of arms folding is slightly less studied than the manner of clasping hands. In search of the main factors that determine this dimorphism, the same difficulties emerge as with clasping hands. However, utilising the findings and the views of many authors, it can be concluded that the manner of arms folding is hereditary and that it inherits the model that does not fit into the genetics concept of simple Mendelian characters, although in this respect there are contradictory findings. The main conclusion is that the manifestation of alternative phenotypes with these characteristics is irrespective of sex and age, and that it is not related to handedness.

Supporters of the assumptions that genetic factors play an important role in forming these properties are reinforced by the data of very heterogeneous frequencies of alternative phenotypes (R and L) in the explored portion of the world's population. But the point of view that basic genetics could explain the phenomena has also been put in discussion; it is not accepted by all researchers. Luria (1947/1970) proposed left-top positions in arm folding (AF) and hand clasping (HC) to be signs of "latent left-handedness". While human beings are more right-handed as animals, it is supposed that left-handedness could be latent. Experiments support Luria's proposition that a left-top preference in Arm Folding points to "latent" left-handedness, but only if associated with a right-top preference in hand clasping.

== Phenotype R distribution ==
The data in the following table summarize R distributions in various areas as concluded by the cited studies.

Area	N	R (%)	Reference
Belgium	626	43.6	Leguebe (1967)
Bosnia and Herzegovina	10,073	46.5	Hadžiselimović et al. (1979)
Germany	304	50.0	Ludwig (1932)
Greece	?	45.4	Pelecanos (1969)
Poland	771	35.3	Wolanski et al. (1973)
Serbia: Užice	2,217	40.2	Hadžiselimović et al. (1979)
Serbia: Voivodina	2,686	45.6	Gavrilović, Božić (1972)
Spain	486	41.3	Pons (1961)
Sweden	981	46.6	Beckman, Elston (1962)

== See also ==
- Hand clasping
- Arm
- Forearm
