= 2017 Telekom Cup (January) =

Tournament details
- Host country: Germany
- City: Düsseldorf
- Dates: 14 January 2017
- Teams: 4 (from 1 confederation)
- Venue: 1 (in 1 host city)

Final positions
- Champions: Bayern Munich (3rd title)
- Runners-up: Mainz 05
- Third place: Fortuna Düsseldorf
- Fourth place: Borussia Mönchengladbach

Tournament statistics
- Matches played: 4
- Goals scored: 6 (1.5 per match)

The January 2017 Telekom Cup was the 8th edition of the Telekom Cup, a football friendly tournament organized by Deutsche Telekom, who is also the sponsor. It was hosted by Fortuna Düsseldorf at the ESPRIT arena in Düsseldorf, on 14 January 2017. Alongside the hosts, Mainz 05, Borussia Mönchengladbach, and Bayern Munich also took part.

== Overview ==
=== Participants ===
| Nation | Team | Location | Confederation | League | Tournament appearance | Last appearance | Previous best performance |
|---|---|---|---|---|---|---|---|
| Germany | Fortuna Düsseldorf (hosts) | Düsseldorf | UEFA | 2. Bundesliga | 1st | — | Debut |
| Germany | Mainz 05 | Mainz | UEFA | Bundesliga | 2nd | 2011 | Fourth place (2011) |
| Germany | Borussia Mönchengladbach | Mönchengladbach | UEFA | Bundesliga | 4th | 2015 | Runners-up (2013) |
| Germany | Bayern Munich | Munich | UEFA | Bundesliga | 8th | 2015 | Winners (2013, 2014) |

=== Bracket ===
Semi-finals
14 January 2017
Fortuna Düsseldorf | 0 (1)
Bayern Munich | 0 (4)
14 January 2017
Borussia Mönchengladbach | 0
Mainz 05 | 1

Final
14 January 2017
Bayern Munich | 2
Mainz 05 | 1
Third place play-off
14 January 2017
Fortuna Düsseldorf | 2
Borussia Mönchengladbach | 0

=== Matches ===
All matches lasted for just 45 minutes. If a match was level after normal time then a penalty shoot-out was played to decide who advanced.

Semi-finals

14 January 2017
15:00 CET

| Fortuna Düsseldorf | 0–0 | Bayern Munich |
|---|---|---|
| | Report |
Penalties
| Hennings (penalty missed); Fink (penalty missed); Ayhan (penalty scored) | 1–4 | (penalty scored) Vidal; (penalty scored) Alonso; (penalty scored) Douglas Costa; (penalty scored) Alaba |

ESPRIT arena, Düsseldorf
Attendance: 41,244
Referee: Sven Waschitzki

14 January 2017
16:15 CET

| Borussia Mönchengladbach | 0–1 | Mainz 05 |
|---|---|---|
| | Report | Vestergaard 8' (o.g.) |

ESPRIT arena, Düsseldorf
Attendance: 41,244
Referee: Benjamin Bläser

Third place play-off

14 January 2017
17:30 CET

| Fortuna Düsseldorf | 2–0 | Borussia Mönchengladbach |
|---|---|---|
| Ayhan 3'; Iyoha 7' | Report |

ESPRIT arena, Düsseldorf
Attendance: 41,244
Referee: Sven Waschitzki

Final

14 January 2017
18:45 CET

| Bayern Munich | 2–1 | Mainz 05 |
|---|---|---|
| Ribéry 4'; Martínez 11' | Report | Ramalho 8' |

ESPRIT arena, Düsseldorf
Attendance: 41,244
Referee: Benjamin Bläser

=== Goalscorers ===
| Rank | Name | Team | Goals |
|---|---|---|---|
| 1 | (Turkey) Kaan Ayhan | Fortuna Düsseldorf | 1 |
| 1 | (Germany) Emmanuel Iyoha | Fortuna Düsseldorf | 1 |
| 1 | (Spain) Javi Martínez | Bayern Munich | 1 |
| 1 | (Brazil) André Ramalho | Mainz 05 | 1 |
| 1 | (France) Franck Ribéry | Bayern Munich | 1 |
| O.G. | (Denmark) Jannik Vestergaard | Borussia Mönchengladbach | 1 |
