= European Cup and UEFA Champions League records and statistics =

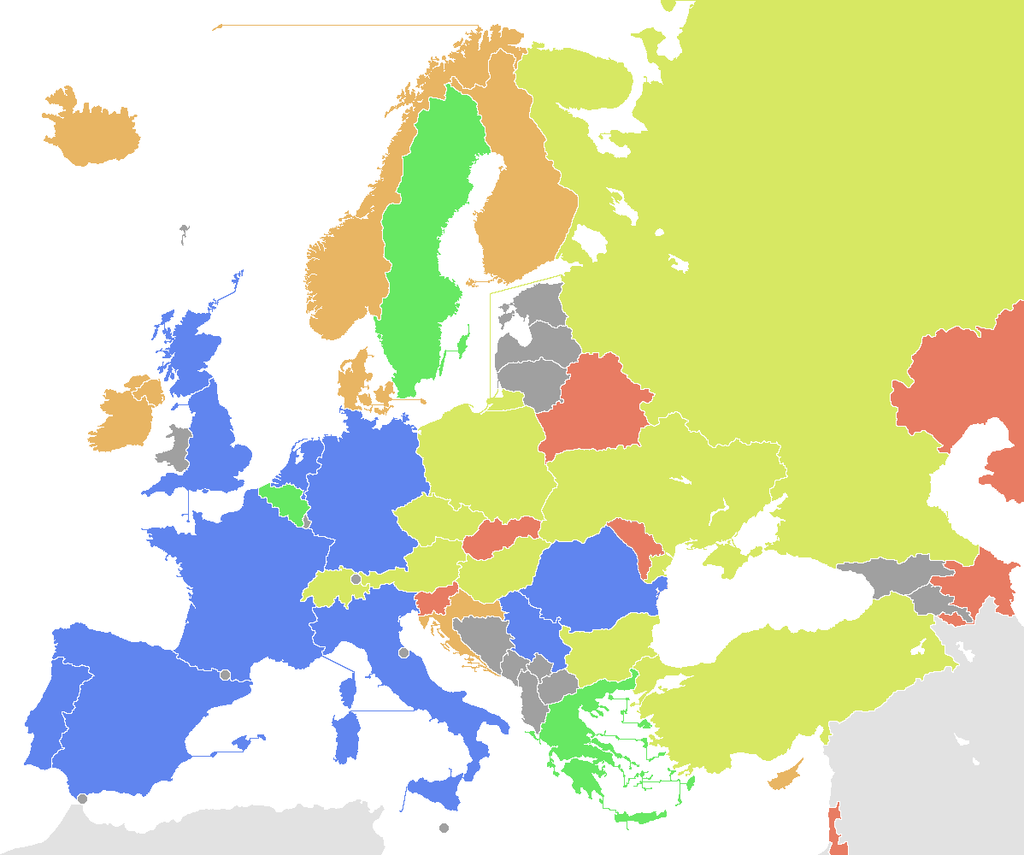
UEFA countries, stages reached by teams on the UEFA Champions League and European Cup: UEFA member nation with winning clubs UEFA member nation with runner-up clubs UEFA member nation that has been represented in the semi-final UEFA member nation that has been represented in the round of 16 or quarter-final UEFA member nation that has been represented in the group stage UEFA member nation that has not been represented in the group stage Not a UEFA member

This page details statistics of all seasons of the European Cup and Champions League. These statistics do not include the qualifying rounds of the UEFA Champions League, unless otherwise noted.

== General performances ==
=== By club ===
Twenty-four clubs have won the tournament since its 1955 inception. Real Madrid is the most successful club in the tournament, winning it fifteen times. A total of fourteen clubs have won the tournament multiple times: Real Madrid, Milan, Bayern Munich, Liverpool, Benfica, Inter Milan, Ajax, Nottingham Forest, Juventus, Manchester United, Porto, Barcelona, Chelsea and Paris Saint-Germain. Eighteen clubs have reached the final but never won the tournament.

Spanish clubs are the most successful, winning twenty titles. England is second with fifteen, Italy is third with twelve and Germany is fourth with eight. Netherlands has six, Portugal has four, France has three and Scotland, Romania and Yugoslavia have one each. Clubs from Greece, Belgium and Sweden have reached the final but never won.

Performances in the European Cup and UEFA Champions League by club
Club	Title(s)	Runners-up	Seasons won	Seasons runner-up
(Spain) Real Madrid	15	3	1956, 1957, 1958, 1959, 1960, 1966, 1998, 2000, 2002, 2014, 2016, 2017, 2018, 2022, 2024	1962, 1964, 1981
(Italy) Milan	7	4	1963, 1969, 1989, 1990, 1994, 2003, 2007	1958, 1993, 1995, 2005
(Germany) Bayern Munich	6	5	1974, 1975, 1976, 2001, 2013, 2020	1982, 1987, 1999, 2010, 2012
(England) Liverpool	6	4	1977, 1978, 1981, 1984, 2005, 2019	1985, 2007, 2018, 2022
(Spain) Barcelona	5	3	1992, 2006, 2009, 2011, 2015	1961, 1986, 1994
(Netherlands) Ajax	4	2	1971, 1972, 1973, 1995	1969, 1996
(Italy) Inter Milan	3	4	1964, 1965, 2010	1967, 1972, 2023, 2025
(England) Manchester United	3	2	1968, 1999, 2008	2009, 2011
(Italy) Juventus	2	7	1985, 1996	1973, 1983, 1997, 1998, 2003, 2015, 2017
(Portugal) Benfica	2	5	1961, 1962	1963, 1965, 1968, 1988, 1990
(England) Chelsea	2	1	2012, 2021	2008
(France) Paris Saint-Germain	2	1	2025, 2026	2020
(England) Nottingham Forest	2	0	1979, 1980	—
(Portugal) Porto	2	0	1987, 2004	—
(Germany) Borussia Dortmund	1	2	1997	2013, 2024
(Scotland) Celtic	1	1	1967	1970
(Germany) Hamburger SV	1	1	1983	1980
(Romania) Steaua București	1	1	1986	1989
(France) Marseille	1	1	1993	1991
(England) Manchester City	1	1	2023	2021
(Netherlands) Feyenoord	1	0	1970	—
(England) Aston Villa	1	0	1982	—
(Netherlands) PSV Eindhoven	1	0	1988	—
(Socialist Federal Republic of Yugoslavia) Red Star Belgrade	1	0	1991	—
(Spain) Atlético Madrid	0	3	—	1974, 2014, 2016
(France) Reims	0	2	—	1956, 1959
(Spain) Valencia	0	2	—	2000, 2001
(England) Arsenal	0	2	—	2006, 2026
(Italy) Fiorentina	0	1	—	1957
(Germany) Eintracht Frankfurt	0	1	—	1960
(Socialist Federal Republic of Yugoslavia) Partizan	0	1	—	1966
(Greece) Panathinaikos	0	1	—	1971
(England) Leeds United	0	1	—	1975
(France) Saint-Étienne	0	1	—	1976
(Germany) Borussia Mönchengladbach	0	1	—	1977
(Belgium) Club Brugge	0	1	—	1978
(Sweden) Malmö FF	0	1	—	1979
(Italy) Roma	0	1	—	1984
(Italy) Sampdoria	0	1	—	1992
(Germany) Bayer Leverkusen	0	1	—	2002
(France) Monaco	0	1	—	2004
(England) Tottenham Hotspur	0	1	—	2019

=== By nation ===
Nation	Winners	Runners-up	Winning clubs	Runners-up
Spain	20	11	Real Madrid (15); Barcelona (5)	Atlético Madrid (3); Barcelona (3); Real Madrid (3); Valencia (2)
England	15	12	Liverpool (6); Manchester United (3); Chelsea (2); Nottingham Forest (2); Aston Villa (1); Manchester City (1)	Liverpool (4); Manchester United (2); Arsenal (2); Chelsea (1); Leeds United (1); Manchester City (1); Tottenham Hotspur (1)
Italy	12	18	Milan (7); Inter Milan (3); Juventus (2)	Juventus (7); Milan (4); Inter Milan (4); Fiorentina (1); Roma (1); Sampdoria (1)
Germany	8	11	Bayern Munich (6); Hamburger SV (1); Borussia Dortmund (1)	Bayern Munich (5); Borussia Dortmund (2); Bayer Leverkusen (1); Borussia Mönchengladbach (1); Eintracht Frankfurt (1); Hamburger SV (1)
Netherlands	6	2	Ajax (4); Feyenoord (1); PSV Eindhoven (1)	Ajax (2)
Portugal	4	5	Benfica (2); Porto (2)	Benfica (5)
France	3	6	Paris Saint-Germain (2); Marseille (1)	Reims (2); Saint-Étienne (1); Marseille (1); Monaco (1); Paris Saint-Germain (1)
Yugoslavia	1	1	Red Star Belgrade (1)	Partizan (1)
Romania	1	1	Steaua București (1)	Steaua București (1)
Scotland	1	1	Celtic (1)	Celtic (1)
Greece	0	1	—	Panathinaikos (1)
Belgium	0	1	—	Club Brugge (1)
Sweden	0	1	—	Malmö FF (1)

=== All-time points table ===
In this ranking, two points are awarded for a win, one for a draw, and zero for a loss. Following statistical convention in football, matches decided in extra time are counted as wins and losses, while matches decided by penalty shoot-outs are counted as draws. Teams are ranked by total points, then by goal difference, then by goals scored. Only the top twenty-five are listed (includes qualifying rounds).

As of 4 November 2026

Rank	Club	Seasons	Pld	W	D	L	GF	GA	GD	Pts
1	(Spain) Real Madrid	57	521	315	85	121	1150	585	+565	715
2	(Germany) Bayern Munich	43	426	257	84	85	911	429	+482	598
3	(Spain) Barcelona	37	379	222	81	76	776	407	+369	525
4	(Italy) Juventus	39	321	161	77	83	510	329	+181	399
5	(England) Manchester United	31	303	163	70	70	553	307	+244	396
6	(England) Liverpool	30	274	160	50	64	528	257	+271	370
7	(Portugal) Benfica	45	319	142	71	106	519	379	+140	355
8	(Italy) Milan	32	283	138	71	74	457	272	+185	347
9	(Portugal) Porto	39	281	127	61	93	417	320	+97	315
10	(England) Arsenal	25	244	129	52	63	420	246	+174	310
11	(Italy) Inter Milan	28	242	119	60	63	351	245	+106	298
12	(Netherlands) Ajax	40	255	114	64	77	404	303	+101	292
13	(Ukraine) Dynamo Kyiv	41	264	109	57	98	369	324	+45	275
14	(England) Chelsea	20	211	109	54	48	361	199	+162	272
15	(Scotland) Celtic	41	242	106	46	90	361	307	+54	258
16	(France) Paris Saint-Germain	20	193	107	35	51	405	224	+181	249
17	(Germany) Borussia Dortmund	25	211	103	40	68	364	270	+94	246
18	(Spain) Atlético Madrid	22	200	97	48	55	310	212	+98	242
19	(Netherlands) PSV Eindhoven	34	223	82	55	86	314	300	+14	219
20	(England) Manchester City	17	153	85	29	39	322	185	+137	199
21	(Serbia) Red Star Belgrade	32	177	78	36	63	322	251	+71	192
22	(Croatia) Dinamo Zagreb	27	176	75	37	64	270	249	+21	187
23	(Turkey) Galatasaray	31	207	70	47	90	264	330	–66	187
24	(Belgium) Anderlecht	34	200	70	44	86	282	320	–38	184
25	(Scotland) Rangers	35	185	67	45	73	257	272	–15	179

=== Number of participating clubs of the Champions League era (from 1992–present) ===
A total of 163 clubs from 34 national associations have played in or qualified for the Champions League group stage. Season in bold represents teams qualified for the knockout phase that season. Between 1999–2000 and 2002–03, qualification is considered from the second group stage. Starting from the 2024–25 season with the introduction of a league phase, the top eight are considered to be qualified as well as the eight play-off winners.

Bolded seasons indicate club qualified for the season's knockout stage proper (round of 16 onwards).

Nation	No.	Club	Seasons
Germany (15)	30	Bayern Munich	**1994–95**, **1997–98**, **1998–99**, **1999–2000**, **2000–01**, **2001–02**, 2002–03, **2003–04**, **2004–05**, **2005–06**, **2006–07**, **2008–09**, **2009–10**, **2010–11**, **2011–12**, **2012–13**, **2013–14**, **2014–15**, **2015–16**, **2016–17**, **2017–18**, **2018–19**, **2019–20**, **2020–21**, **2021–22**, **2022–23**, **2023–24**, **2024–25**, **2025–26**, 2026–27
Germany (15)	21	Borussia Dortmund	**1995–96**, **1996–97**, **1997–98**, 1999–2000, 2001–02, 2002–03, 2011–12, **2012–13**, **2013–14**, **2014–15**, **2016–17**, 2017–18, **2018–19**, **2019–20**, **2020–21**, 2021–22, **2022–23**, **2023–24**, **2024–25**, 2025–26, 2026–27
Germany (15)	15	Bayer Leverkusen	**1997–98**, 1999–2000, 2000–01, **2001–02**, 2002–03, **2004–05**, **2011–12**, **2013–14**, **2014–15**, 2015–16, **2016–17**, 2019–20, 2022–23, **2024–25**, **2025–26**
Germany (15)	8	Schalke 04	2001–02, 2005–06, **2007–08**, **2010–11**, **2012–13**, **2013–14**, **2014–15**, **2018–19**
Germany (15)	8	RB Leipzig	2017–18, **2019–20**, **2020–21**, 2021–22, **2022–23**, **2023–24**, 2024–25, 2026–27
Germany (15)	7	Werder Bremen	1993–94, **2004–05**, **2005–06**, 2006–07, 2007–08, 2008–09, 2010–11
Germany (15)	5	VfB Stuttgart	**2003–04**, 2007–08, **2009–10**, 2024–25, 2026–27
Germany (15)	3	Borussia Mönchengladbach	2015–16, 2016–17, **2020–21**
Germany (15)	3	VfL Wolfsburg	2009–10, **2015–16**, 2021–22
Germany (15)	2	Hamburger SV	2000–01, 2006–07
Germany (15)	2	Eintracht Frankfurt	**2022–23**, 2025–26
Germany (15)	1	1. FC Kaiserslautern	**1998–99**
Germany (15)	1	Hertha BSC	1999–2000
Germany (15)	1	TSG Hoffenheim	2018–19
Germany (15)	1	Union Berlin	2023–24
Spain (14)	31	Barcelona	**1993–94**, **1994–95**, 1997–98, 1998–99, **1999–2000**, 2000–01, **2001–02**, **2002–03**, **2004–05**, **2005–06**, **2006–07**, **2007–08**, **2008–09**, **2009–10**, **2010–11**, **2011–12**, **2012–13**, **2013–14**, **2014–15**, **2015–16**, **2016–17**, **2017–18**, **2018–19**, **2019–20**, **2020–21**, 2021–22, 2022–23, **2023–24**, **2024–25**, **2025–26**, 2026–27
Spain (14)	31	Real Madrid	**1995–96**, **1997–98**, **1998–99**, **1999–2000**, **2000–01**, **2001–02**, **2002–03**, **2003–04**, **2004–05**, **2005–06**, **2006–07**, **2007–08**, **2008–09**, **2009–10**, **2010–11**, **2011–12**, **2012–13**, **2013–14**, **2014–15**, **2015–16**, **2016–17**, **2017–18**, **2018–19**, **2019–20**, **2020–21**, **2021–22**, **2022–23**, **2023–24**, **2024–25**, **2025–26**, 2026–27
Spain (14)	17	Atlético Madrid	**1996–97**, **2008–09**, 2009–10, **2013–14**, **2014–15**, **2015–16**, **2016–17**, 2017–18, **2018–19**, **2019–20**, **2020–21**, **2021–22**, 2022–23, **2023–24**, **2024–25**, **2025–26**, 2026–27
Spain (14)	12	Valencia	**1999–2000**, **2000–01**, **2002–03**, 2004–05, **2006–07**, 2007–08, **2010–11**, 2011–12, **2012–13**, 2015–16, 2018–19, **2019–20**
Spain (14)	9	Sevilla	**2007–08**, **2009–10**, 2015–16, **2016–17**, **2017–18**, **2020–21**, 2021–22, 2022–23, 2023–24
Spain (14)	6	Villarreal	**2005–06**, **2008–09**, 2011–12, **2021–22**, 2025–26, 2026–27
Spain (14)	5	Deportivo A Coruña	**2000–01**, **2001–02**, 2002–03, **2003–04**, 2004–05
Spain (14)	3	Real Sociedad	**2003–04**, 2013–14, **2023–24**
Spain (14)	3	Athletic Bilbao	1998–99, 2014–15, 2025–26
Spain (14)	2	Real Betis	2005–06, 2026–27
Spain (14)	1	Mallorca	2001–02
Spain (14)	1	Celta Vigo	**2003–04**
Spain (14)	1	Málaga	**2012–13**
Spain (14)	1	Girona	2024–25
Italy (12)	25	Juventus	**1995–96**, **1996–97**, **1997–98**, **1998–99**, 2000–01, 2001–02, **2002–03**, **2003–04**, **2004–05**, **2005–06**, **2008–09**, 2009–10, **2012–13**, 2013–14, **2014–15**, **2015–16**, **2016–17**, **2017–18**, **2018–19**, **2019–20**, **2020–21**, **2021–22**, 2022–23, 2024–25, 2025–26
Italy (12)	21	Milan	**1992–93**, **1993–94**, **1994–95**, 1996–97, 1999–2000, 2000–01, **2002–03**, **2003–04**, **2004–05**, **2005–06**, **2006–07**, **2007–08**, **2009–10**, **2010–11**, **2011–12**, **2012–13**, **2013–14**, 2021–22, **2022–23**, 2023–24, 2024–25
Italy (12)	20	Inter Milan	**1998–99**, **2002–03**, 2003–04, **2004–05**, **2005–06**, **2006–07**, **2007–08**, **2008–09**, **2009–10**, **2010–11**, **2011–12**, 2018–19, 2019–20, 2020–21, **2021–22**, **2022–23**, **2023–24**, **2024–25**, 2025–26, 2026–27
Italy (12)	12	Roma	2001–02, 2002–03, 2004–05, **2006–07**, **2007–08**, **2008–09**, **2010–11**, 2014–15, **2015–16**, **2017–18**, **2018–19**, 2026–27
Italy (12)	10	Napoli	**2011–12**, 2013–14, **2016–17**, 2017–18, 2018–19, **2019–20**, **2022–23**, **2023–24**, 2025–26, 2026–27
Italy (12)	7	Lazio	**1999–2000**, 2000–01, 2001–02, 2003–04, 2007–08, **2020–21**, **2023–24**
Italy (12)	5	Atalanta	**2019–20**, **2020–21**, 2021–22, 2024–25, **2025–26**
Italy (12)	3	Fiorentina	1999–2000, 2008–09, **2009–10**
Italy (12)	1	Parma	1997–98
Italy (12)	1	Udinese	2005–06
Italy (12)	1	Bologna	2024–25
Italy (12)	1	Como	2026–27
France (12)	19	Paris Saint-Germain	**1994–95**, 1997–98, 2000–01, 2004–05, **2012–13**, **2013–14**, **2014–15**, **2015–16**, **2016–17**, **2017–18**, **2018–19**, **2019–20**, **2020–21**, **2021–22**, **2022–23**, **2023–24**, **2024–25**, **2025–26**, 2026–27
France (12)	16	Lyon	2000–01, 2001–02, 2002–03, **2003–04**, **2004–05**, **2005–06**, **2006–07**, **2007–08**, **2008–09**, **2009–10**, **2010–11**, **2011–12**, 2015–16, 2016–17, **2018–19**, **2019–20**
France (12)	12	Marseille	**1992–93**, 1999–2000, 2003–04, 2007–08, 2008–09, 2009–10, **2010–11**, **2011–12**, 2013–14, 2020–21, 2022–23, 2025–26
France (12)	11	Monaco	**1993–94**, **1997–98**, 2000–01, **2003–04**, **2004–05**, **2014–15**, **2016–17**, 2017–18, 2018–19, 2024–25, 2025–26
France (12)	9	Lille	2001–02, 2005–06, **2006–07**, 2011–12, 2012–13, 2019–20, **2021–22**, **2024–25**, 2026–27
France (12)	4	Bordeaux	1999–2000, 2006–07, 2008–09, **2009–10**
France (12)	4	Lens	1998–99, 2002–03, 2023–24, 2026–27
France (12)	3	Auxerre	**1996–97**, 2002–03, 2010–11
France (12)	2	Nantes	**1995–96**, 2001–02
France (12)	1	Montpellier	2012–13
France (12)	1	Rennes	2020–21
France (12)	1	Brest	2024–25
England (11)	26	Manchester United	1994–95, **1996–97**, **1997–98**, **1998–99**, **1999–2000**, **2000–01**, **2001–02**, **2002–03**, **2003–04**, **2004–05**, 2005–06, **2006–07**, **2007–08**, **2008–09**, **2009–10**, **2010–11**, 2011–12, **2012–13**, **2013–14**, 2015–16, **2017–18**, **2018–19**, 2020–21, **2021–22**, 2023–24, 2026–27
England (11)	23	Arsenal	1998–99, 1999–2000, **2000–01**, 2001–02, 2002–03, **2003–04**, **2004–05**, **2005–06**, **2006–07**, **2007–08**, **2008–09**, **2009–10**, **2010–11**, **2011–12**, **2012–13**, **2013–14**, **2014–15**, **2015–16**, **2016–17**, **2023–24**, **2024–25**, **2025–26**, 2026–27
England (11)	20	Chelsea	**1999–2000**, **2003–04**, **2004–05**, **2005–06**, **2006–07**, **2007–08**, **2008–09**, **2009–10**, **2010–11**, **2011–12**, 2012–13, **2013–14**, **2014–15**, **2015–16**, **2017–18**, **2019–20**, **2020–21**, **2021–22**, **2022–23**, **2025–26**
England (11)	18	Liverpool	**2001–02**, 2002–03, **2004–05**, **2005–06**, **2006–07**, **2007–08**, **2008–09**, 2009–10, 2014–15, **2017–18**, **2018–19**, **2019–20**, **2020–21**, **2021–22**, **2022–23**, **2024–25**, **2025–26**, 2026–27
England (11)	16	Manchester City	2011–12, 2012–13, **2013–14**, **2014–15**, **2015–16**, **2016–17**, **2017–18**, **2018–19**, **2019–20**, **2020–21**, **2021–22**, **2022–23**, **2023–24**, 2024–25, **2025–26**, 2026–27
England (11)	7	Tottenham Hotspur	**2010–11**, 2016–17, **2017–18**, **2018–19**, **2019–20**, **2022–23**, **2025–26**
England (11)	4	Newcastle United	1997–98, 2002–03, 2023–24, **2025–26**
England (11)	2	Aston Villa	**2024–25**, 2026–27
England (11)	1	Blackburn Rovers	1995–96
England (11)	1	Leeds United	**2000–01**
England (11)	1	Leicester City	**2016–17**
Belgium (8)	13	Club Brugge	1992–93, 2002–03, 2003–04, 2005–06, 2016–17, 2018–19, 2019–20, 2020–21, 2021–22, **2022–23**, **2024–25**, 2025–26, 2026–27
Belgium (8)	12	Anderlecht	1993–94, 1994–95, 2000–01, 2001–02, 2003–04, 2004–05, 2005–06, 2006–07, 2012–13, 2013–14, 2014–15, 2017–18
Belgium (8)	3	Genk	2002–03, 2011–12, 2019–20
Belgium (8)	1	Lierse	1997–98
Belgium (8)	1	Standard Liège	2009–10
Belgium (8)	1	Gent	**2015–16**
Belgium (8)	1	Antwerp	2023–24
Belgium (8)	1	Union Saint-Gilloise	2025–26
Netherlands (7)	20	PSV Eindhoven	1992–93, 1997–98, 1998–99, 1999–2000, 2000–01, 2001–02, 2002–03, 2003–04, **2004–05**, **2005–06**, **2006–07**, 2007–08, 2008–09, **2015–16**, 2016–17, 2018–19, **2023–24**, **2024–25**, 2025–26, 2026–27
Netherlands (7)	19	Ajax	**1994–95**, **1995–96**, **1996–97**, 1998–99, **2002–03**, 2003–04, 2004–05, **2005–06**, 2010–11, 2011–12, 2012–13, 2013–14, 2014–15, **2018–19**, 2019–20, 2020–21, **2021–22**, 2022–23, 2025–26
Netherlands (7)	8	Feyenoord	1997–98, 1999–2000, 2001–02, 2002–03, 2017–18, 2023–24, **2024–25**, 2026–27
Netherlands (7)	1	Willem II	1999–2000
Netherlands (7)	1	Heerenveen	2000–01
Netherlands (7)	1	AZ	2009–10
Netherlands (7)	1	Twente	2010–11
Russia (7)	12	Spartak Moscow	1993–94, 1994–95, **1995–96**, 1998–99, 1999–2000, 2000–01, 2001–02, 2002–03, 2006–07, 2010–11, 2012–13, 2017–18
Russia (7)	12	CSKA Moscow	1992–93, 2004–05, 2006–07, 2007–08, **2009–10**, **2011–12**, 2013–14, 2014–15, 2015–16, 2016–17, 2017–18, 2018–19
Russia (7)	9	Zenit Saint Petersburg	2008–09, **2011–12**, 2012–13, **2013–14**, 2014–15, **2015–16**, 2019–20, 2020–21, 2021–22
Russia (7)	6	Lokomotiv Moscow	2001–02, 2002–03, **2003–04**, 2018–19, 2019–20, 2020–21
Russia (7)	2	Rubin Kazan	2009–10, 2010–11
Russia (7)	1	Rostov	2016–17
Russia (7)	1	Krasnodar	2020–21
Turkey (6)	19	Galatasaray	1993–94, 1994–95, 1997–98, 1998–99, 1999–2000, **2000–01**, 2001–02, 2002–03, 2003–04, 2006–07, **2012–13**, **2013–14**, 2014–15, 2015–16, 2018–19, 2019–20, 2023–24, **2025–26**, 2026–27
Turkey (6)	8	Beşiktaş	1997–98, 2000–01, 2003–04, 2007–08, 2009–10, 2016–17, **2017–18**, 2021–22
Turkey (6)	7	Fenerbahçe	1996–97, 2001–02, 2004–05, 2005–06, **2007–08**, 2008–09, 2026–27
Turkey (6)	1	Bursaspor	2010–11
Turkey (6)	1	Trabzonspor	2011–12
Turkey (6)	1	İstanbul Başakşehir	2020–21
Portugal (5)	28	Porto	1992–93, **1993–94**, 1995–96, **1996–97**, 1997–98, 1998–99, **1999–2000**, 2001–02, **2003–04**, **2004–05**, 2005–06, **2006–07**, **2007–08**, **2008–09**, **2009–10**, 2011–12, **2012–13**, 2013–14, **2014–15**, 2015–16, **2016–17**, **2017–18**, **2018–19**, **2020–21**, 2021–22, **2022–23**, **2023–24**, 2026–27
Portugal (5)	20	Benfica	**1994–95**, 1998–99, **2005–06**, 2006–07, 2007–08, 2010–11, **2011–12**, 2012–13, 2013–14, 2014–15, **2015–16**, **2016–17**, 2017–18, 2018–19, 2019–20, **2021–22**, **2022–23**, 2023–24, **2024–25**, **2025–26**
Portugal (5)	13	Sporting CP	1997–98, 2000–01, 2006–07, 2007–08, **2008–09**, 2014–15, 2016–17, 2017–18, **2021–22**, 2022–23, 2024–25, **2025–26**, 2026–27
Portugal (5)	3	Braga	2010–11, 2012–13, 2023–24
Portugal (5)	2	Boavista	1999–2000, 2001–02
Switzerland (5)	8	Basel	2002–03, 2008–09, 2010–11, **2011–12**, 2013–14, **2014–15**, 2016–17, **2017–18**
Switzerland (5)	4	Young Boys	2018–19, 2021–22, 2023–24, 2024–25
Switzerland (5)	2	Grasshopper	1995–96, 1996–97
Switzerland (5)	1	Thun	2005–06
Switzerland (5)	1	Zürich	2009–10
Austria (5)	7	Red Bull Salzburg	1994–95, 2019–20, 2020–21, **2021–22**, 2022–23, 2023–24, 2024–25
Austria (5)	4	Sturm Graz	1998–99, 1999–2000, 2000–01, 2024–25
Austria (5)	2	Rapid Wien	1996–97, 2005–06
Austria (5)	1	Austria Wien	2013–14
Austria (5)	1	LASK	2026–27
Denmark (5)	7	Copenhagen	2006–07, **2010–11**, 2013–14, 2016–17, 2022–23, **2023–24**, 2025–26
Denmark (5)	2	Aalborg	1995–96, 2008–09
Denmark (5)	1	Brøndby	1998–99
Denmark (5)	1	Nordsjælland	2012–13
Denmark (5)	1	Midtjylland	2020–21
Romania (5)	4	FCSB	2006–07, 2007–08, 2008–09, 2013–14
Romania (5)	3	Steaua	1994–95, 1995–96, 1996–97
Romania (5)	3	CFR Cluj	2008–09, 2010–11, 2012–13
Romania (5)	1	Unirea Urziceni	2009–10
Romania (5)	1	Oțelul Galați	2011–12
Norway (4)	11	Rosenborg	1995–96, **1996–97**, 1997–98, 1998–99, 1999–2000, 2000–01, 2001–02, 2002–03, 2004–05, 2005–06, 2007–08
Norway (4)	2	Bodø/Glimt	**2025–26**, 2026–27
Norway (4)	1	Molde	1999–2000
Norway (4)	1	Viking	2026–27
Sweden (4)	4	IFK Göteborg	1992–93, **1994–95**, 1996–97, 1997–98
Sweden (4)	3	Malmö FF	2014–15, 2015–16, 2021–22
Sweden (4)	1	AIK	1999–2000
Sweden (4)	1	Helsingborgs IF	2000–01
Slovakia (4)	2	Slovan Bratislava	2024–25, 2026–27
Slovakia (4)	1	Košice	1997–98
Slovakia (4)	1	Petržalka	2005–06
Slovakia (4)	1	Žilina	2010–11
Greece (3)	21	Olympiacos	1997–98, **1998–99**, 1999–2000, 2000–01, 2001–02, 2002–03, 2003–04, 2004–05, 2005–06, 2006–07, **2007–08**, **2009–10**, 2011–12, 2012–13, **2013–14**, 2014–15, 2015–16, 2017–18, 2019–20, 2020–21, 2025–26
Greece (3)	9	Panathinaikos	**1995–96**, 1998–99, 2000–01, **2001–02**, 2003–04, 2004–05, 2005–06, **2008–09**, 2010–11
Greece (3)	6	AEK Athens	1994–95, 2002–03, 2003–04, 2006–07, 2018–19, 2026–27
Czech Republic (3)	8	Sparta Prague	1997–98, 1999–2000, 2000–01, 2001–02, **2003–04**, 2004–05, 2005–06, 2024–25
Czech Republic (3)	4	Viktoria Plzeň	2011–12, 2013–14, 2018–19, 2022–23
Czech Republic (3)	4	Slavia Prague	2007–08, 2019–20, 2025–26, 2026–27
Cyprus (3)	4	APOEL	2009–10, **2011–12**, 2014–15, 2017–18
Cyprus (3)	1	Anorthosis	2008–09
Cyprus (3)	1	Pafos	2025–26
Israel (3)	3	Maccabi Haifa	2002–03, 2009–10, 2022–23
Israel (3)	2	Maccabi Tel Aviv	2004–05, 2015–16
Israel (3)	1	Hapoel Tel Aviv	2010–11
Ukraine (2)	20	Shakhtar Donetsk	2000–01, 2004–05, 2006–07, 2007–08, 2008–09, **2010–11**, 2011–12, **2012–13**, 2013–14, **2014–15**, 2015–16, **2017–18**, 2018–19, 2019–20, 2020–21, 2021–22, 2022–23, 2023–24, 2024–25, 2026–27
Ukraine (2)	18	Dynamo Kyiv	1994–95, **1997–98**, **1998–99**, 1999–2000, 2000–01, 2001–02, 2002–03, 2003–04, 2004–05, 2006–07, 2007–08, 2008–09, 2009–10, 2012–13, **2015–16**, 2016–17, 2020–21, 2021–22
Scotland (2)	13	Celtic	2001–02, 2003–04, 2004–05, **2006–07**, **2007–08**, 2008–09, **2012–13**, 2013–14, 2016–17, 2017–18, 2022–23, 2023–24, 2024–25
Scotland (2)	11	Rangers	1992–93, 1995–96, 1996–97, 1999–2000, 2000–01, 2003–04, **2005–06**, 2007–08, 2009–10, 2010–11, 2022–23
Croatia (2)	9	Dinamo Zagreb	1998–99, 1999–2000, 2011–12, 2012–13, 2015–16, 2016–17, 2019–20, 2022–23, 2024–25
Croatia (2)	1	Hajduk Split	**1994–95**
Serbia (2)	4	Red Star Belgrade	2018–19, 2019–20, 2023–24, 2024–25
Serbia (2)	2	Partizan	2003–04, 2010–11
Poland (2)	2	Legia Warsaw	**1995–96**, 2016–17
Poland (2)	1	Widzew Łódź	1996–97
Bulgaria (2)	2	Ludogorets Razgrad	2014–15, 2016–17
Bulgaria (2)	1	Levski Sofia	2006–07
Hungary (2)	2	Ferencváros	1995–96, 2020–21
Hungary (2)	1	Debrecen	2009–10
Azerbaijan (2)	2	Qarabağ	2017–18, 2025–26
Azerbaijan (2)	1	Sabah	2026–27
Kazakhstan (2)	1	Astana	2015–16
Kazakhstan (2)	1	Kairat	2025–26
Belarus (1)	5	BATE Borisov	2008–09, 2011–12, 2012–13, 2014–15, 2015–16
Slovenia (1)	3	Maribor	1999–2000, 2014–15, 2017–18
Finland (1)	1	HJK	1998–99
Moldova (1)	1	Sheriff Tiraspol	2021–22

European Cup group stage participants (only one season was played in this format)

1991–92:

- (Belgium) Anderlecht
- (Spain) **Barcelona**
- (Portugal) Benfica
- (Commonwealth of Independent States) Dynamo Kyiv
- (Greece) Panathinaikos
- (Socialist Federal Republic of Yugoslavia) Red Star Belgrade
- (Italy) **Sampdoria**
  - Sampdoria is the only side to have played in 1991–92 European Cup group stage, but to have not played in the Champions League group stage.
- (Czechoslovakia) Sparta Prague

=== Goals ===
- Most goals scored in a matchday: **71** – matchday 3 of the league phase, 2025–26 season
- Most goals scored in a season: **655** – 2025–26

=== Host of the finals ===
- Most finals hosted by a city: **8** – (England) London; five at the original Wembley Stadium and three at the new Wembley Stadium.
- Most finals hosted by a nation: **9**
  - England; London eight times and Manchester once.
  - Italy; Milan and Rome four times each and Bari once.
- Most finals hosted at a stadium: **5** – original Wembley Stadium (1963, 1968, 1971, 1978 and 1992)
- Most different final-hosting stadiums in a nation: **5** – Germany (Neckarstadion, Munich Olympiastadion, Arena AufSchalke, Allianz Arena and Berlin Olympiastadion)
- Most different final-hosting stadiums in a city: **2**
  - (England) London (original Wembley Stadium and Wembley Stadium)
  - (Germany) Munich (Munich Olympiastadion and Allianz Arena)
  - (Portugal) Lisbon (Estádio Nacional and Estádio da Luz)
  - (Spain) Madrid (Santiago Bernabéu and Metropolitano)
  - Paris (Parc des Princes and Stade de France)

== Clubs ==
=== By semi-final appearances ===
Year in bold:	team was finalist in that year

Team	No.	Years
(Spain) Real Madrid	33	**1956**, **1957**, **1958**, **1959**, **1960**, **1962**, **1964**, **1966**, 1968, 1973, 1976, 1980, **1981**, 1987, 1988, 1989, **1998**, **2000**, 2001, **2002**, 2003, 2011, 2012, 2013, **2014**, 2015, **2016**, **2017**, **2018**, 2021, **2022**, 2023, **2024**
(Germany) Bayern Munich	22	**1974**, **1975**, **1976**, 1981, **1982**, **1987**, 1990, 1991, 1995, **1999**, 2000, **2001**, **2010**, **2012**, **2013**, 2014, 2015, 2016, 2018, **2020**, 2024, 2026
(Spain) Barcelona	18	1960, **1961**, 1975, **1986**, **1992**, **1994**, 2000, 2002, **2006**, 2008, **2009**, 2010, **2011**, 2012, 2013, **2015**, 2019, 2025
(Italy) Milan	14	1956, **1958**, **1963**, **1969**, **1989**, **1990**, **1993**, **1994**, **1995**, **2003**, **2005**, 2006, **2007**, 2023
(England) Manchester United	12	1957, 1958, 1966, **1968**, 1969, 1997, **1999**, 2002, 2007, **2008**, **2009**, **2011**
(England) Liverpool	12	1965, **1977**, **1978**, **1981**, **1984**, **1985**, **2005**, **2007**, 2008, **2018**, **2019**, **2022**
(Italy) Juventus	12	1968, **1973**, 1978, **1983**, **1985**, **1996**, **1997**, **1998**, 1999, **2003**, **2015**, **2017**
(Italy) Inter Milan	10	**1964**, **1965**, 1966, **1967**, **1972**, 1981, 2003, **2010**, **2023**, **2025**
(Netherlands) Ajax	9	**1969**, **1971**, **1972**, **1973**, 1980, **1995**, **1996**, 1997, 2019
(Portugal) Benfica	8	**1961**, **1962**, **1963**, **1965**, **1968**, 1972, **1988**, **1990**
(England) Chelsea	8	2004, 2005, 2007, **2008**, 2009, **2012**, 2014, **2021**
(Spain) Atlético Madrid	7	1959, 1971, **1974**, **2014**, **2016**, 2017, 2026
(France) Paris Saint-Germain	6	1995, **2020**, 2021, 2024, **2025**, **2026**
(Germany) Borussia Dortmund	5	1964, **1997**, 1998, **2013**, **2024**
(Serbia) Red Star Belgrade	4	1957, 1971, **1991**, 1992
(Scotland) Celtic	4	**1967**, **1970**, 1972, 1974
(France) Monaco	4	1994, 1998, **2004**, 2017
(England) Arsenal	4	**2006**, 2009, 2025, **2026**
(England) Manchester City	4	2016, **2021**, 2022, **2023**
(Germany) Hamburger SV	3	1961, **1980**, **1983**
(England) Leeds United	3	1970, **1975**, 2001
(Greece) Panathinaikos	3	**1971**, 1985, 1996
(Netherlands) PSV Eindhoven	3	1976, **1988**, 2005
(Ukraine) Dynamo Kyiv	3	1977, 1987, 1999
(Romania) Steaua București	3	**1986**, 1988, **1989**
(Portugal) Porto	3	**1987**, 1994, **2004**
(France) Marseille	3	1990, **1991**, **1993**
(France) Reims	2	**1956**, **1959**
(Scotland) Rangers	2	1960, 1993
(England) Tottenham Hotspur	2	1962, **2019**
(Netherlands) Feyenoord	2	1963, **1970**
(Switzerland) Zürich	2	1964, 1977
(Bulgaria) CSKA Sofia	2	1967, 1982
(France) Saint-Étienne	2	1975, **1976**
(Germany) Borussia Mönchengladbach	2	**1977**, 1978
(England) Nottingham Forest	2	**1979**, **1980**
(Belgium) Anderlecht	2	1982, 1986
(Italy) Roma	2	**1984**, 2018
(Sweden) IFK Göteborg	2	1986, 1993
(Spain) Valencia	2	**2000**, **2001**
(Spain) Villarreal	2	2006, 2022
(France) Lyon	2	2010, 2020
(Scotland) Hibernian	1	1956
(Italy) Fiorentina	1	**1957**
(Hungary) Vasas	1	1958
(Switzerland) Young Boys	1	1959
(Germany) Eintracht Frankfurt	1	**1960**
(Austria) Rapid Wien	1	1961
(Belgium) Standard Liège	1	1962
(Scotland) Dundee	1	1963
(Hungary) Győri Vasas ETO	1	1965
(Serbia) Partizan	1	**1966**
(Czech Republic) Dukla Prague	1	1967
(Slovakia) Spartak Trnava	1	1969
(Poland) Legia Warsaw	1	1970
(England) Derby County	1	1973
(Hungary) Újpest	1	1974
(Belgium) Club Brugge	1	**1978**
Austria Wien	1	1979
(Germany) 1. FC Köln	1	1979
(Sweden) Malmö FF	1	**1979**
(England) Aston Villa	1	**1982**
(Spain) Real Sociedad	1	1983
(Poland) Widzew Łódź	1	1983
(Romania) Dinamo București	1	1984
(Scotland) Dundee United	1	1984
(France) Bordeaux	1	1985
(Turkey) Galatasaray	1	1989
(Russia) Spartak Moscow	1	1991
(Czech Republic) Sparta Prague	1	1992
(Italy) Sampdoria	1	**1992**
(France) Nantes	1	1996
(Germany) Bayer Leverkusen	1	**2002**
(Spain) Deportivo La Coruña	1	2004
(Germany) Schalke 04	1	2011
(Germany) RB Leipzig	1	2020

By nation

Nation	Won	Lost	Total	Different clubs
Spain	31	33	64	7
England	28	22	50	10
Italy	30	10	40	6
Germany	19	17	36	9
France	8	12	20	8
Netherlands	8	6	14	3
Portugal	9	2	11	2
Scotland	2	7	9	5
Serbia	2	3	5	2
Romania	2	2	4	2
Belgium	1	3	4	3
Greece	1	2	3	1
Sweden	1	2	3	2
Hungary	0	3	3	3
Switzerland	0	3	3	2
Ukraine	0	3	3	1
Austria	0	2	2	2
Bulgaria	0	2	2	1
Czech Republic	0	2	2	2
Poland	0	2	2	2
Russia	0	1	1	1
Slovakia	0	1	1	1
Turkey	0	1	1	1

Note: In the 1992 and 1993 seasons there were no semi-finals as the finalists qualified via a group stage. The winners (Sampdoria and Barcelona in 1992, Marseille and Milan in 1993) and runners-up (Red Star Belgrade and Sparta Prague in 1992, Rangers and IFK Göteborg in 1993) of the two groups are marked as semi-finalists in the table.

=== Unbeaten sides ===
- Twelve clubs have won either the European Cup or the Champions League unbeaten, and only four clubs have done so twice:
  - (England) Liverpool had six wins and three draws in 1980–81, and seven wins and two draws in 1983–84.
  - (Italy) Milan had five wins and four draws in 1988–89, and seven wins and five draws in 1993–94.
  - (Netherlands) Ajax had seven wins and two draws in 1971–72, and 7 wins and 4 draws in 1994–95.
  - (England) Manchester United had five wins and six draws in 1998–99, and nine wins and four draws in 2007–08.
- Eight clubs have done so on one occasion:
  - (Italy) Inter Milan had seven wins and two draws in 1963–64.
  - (England) Nottingham Forest had six wins and three draws in 1978–79.
  - (Socialist Federal Republic of Yugoslavia) Red Star Belgrade had five wins and four draws in 1990–91.
  - (France) Marseille had seven wins and four draws in 1992–93.
  - (Spain) Barcelona had nine wins and four draws in 2005–06.
  - (Germany) Bayern Munich had eleven wins in eleven games in the reduced-schedule 2019–20, becoming the first side in any European competition to claim a trophy with a 100 percent winning record. (Note: The number of games was reduced from thirteen to eleven during the 2019–20 season due to the impact of the COVID-19 pandemic.)
  - (England) Manchester City had eight wins and five draws in 2022–23.
  - (Spain) Real Madrid had nine wins and four draws in 2023–24.
- Champions with fewest games won: **3** – (Netherlands) PSV Eindhoven (1987–88); managing just three victories in the entire tournament, including none from the quarter-finals onwards.
- Champions with fewest games won in the Champions League: **5** – (England) Manchester United (1998–99)
- Champions with most games lost: **5** – (France) Paris Saint-Germain (2024–25)
- Fewest games lost, but did not win the competition in the UEFA Champions League era: **0**
  - (Scotland) Rangers (1992–93); out of 10 matches, eliminated in the group stage after finishing second; won two matches and drew four.
  - (England) Manchester City (2023–24); out of 10 matches, beaten in the quarter-finals on penalty shoot-out
  - (England) Arsenal (2025–26); out of 15 matches, beaten in the final on penalty shoot-out

=== Final success rate ===
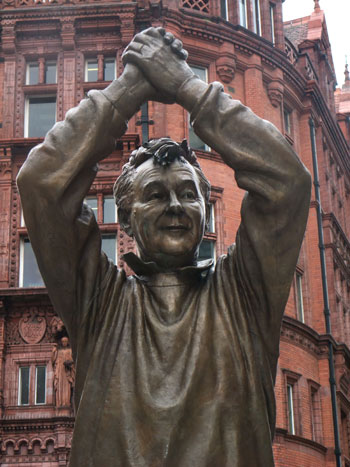
Statue of Brian Clough, Nottingham Forest manager who won the European Cup in 1979 and 1980

- Highest win success rate in the final (at least three finals): **83%** – (Spain) Real Madrid; lost only three finals out of eighteen finals.
- Highest win success rate in the final (at least two finals): **100%**
  - (England) Nottingham Forest (1979, 1980)
  - (Portugal) Porto (1987, 2004)
- Four clubs have appeared in the final once, being victorious on that occasion:
  - (Netherlands) Feyenoord (1970)
  - (England) Aston Villa (1982)
  - (Netherlands) PSV Eindhoven (1988)
  - (Socialist Federal Republic of Yugoslavia) Red Star Belgrade (1991)
- Four clubs played the final more than once but never won:
  - (France) Reims (1956, 1959)
  - (Spain) Valencia (2000, 2001)
  - (Spain) Atlético Madrid (1974, 2014, 2016)
  - (England) Arsenal (2006, 2026)
- Among the clubs that have won at least one final, four have lost more finals than they have won:
  - (Italy) Inter Milan three wins (1964, 1965, 2010) and four losses (1967, 1972, 2023, 2025)
  - (Italy) Juventus two wins (1985, 1996) and seven losses (1973, 1983, 1997, 1998, 2003, 2015, 2017)
  - (Portugal) Benfica two wins (1961, 1962) and five losses (1963, 1965, 1968, 1988, 1990)
  - (Germany) Borussia Dortmund one win (1997) and two losses (2013, 2024)

=== Consecutive appearances ===
- Most consecutive seasons in the European Cup: **15** – (Spain) Real Madrid (1955–56 to 1969–70)
- Most consecutive seasons in the UEFA Champions League: **30** – (Spain) Real Madrid (1997–98 to 2026–27)
- Most consecutive seasons in the UEFA Champions League knockout phase: **29** – (Spain) Real Madrid (1997–98 to 2025–26)
- Most consecutive quarter-final appearances: **13** – (Spain) Barcelona (2007–08 to 2019–20)
- Most consecutive semi-final appearances: **8** – (Spain) Real Madrid (2010–11 to 2017–18)
- Most consecutive final appearances: **5** – (Spain) Real Madrid (1956 to 1960)
- Most consecutive final appearances (Champions League era): **3** – joint record
  - (Italy) Milan (1993 to 1995)
  - (Italy) Juventus (1996 to 1998)
  - (Spain) Real Madrid (2016 to 2018)
- Longest gap between appearances for club: **63 years** – (Germany) Eintracht Frankfurt (between 1959–60 and 2022–23)

=== Winning other trophies ===
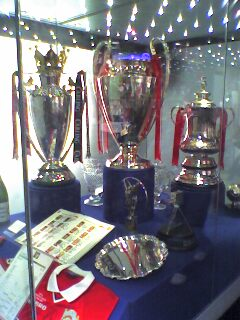
Manchester United won a treble in 1999: the Premier League, Champions League and FA Cup (left to right); the English club also won the 1999 Intercontinental Cup.

See also Treble (association football), Sextuple (association football) and List of association football teams to have won four or more trophies in one season.

- Although not an officially recognised achievement, eight clubs have achieved the distinction of winning the Champions League or European Cup, their domestic championship, and their primary domestic cup competition in the same season, known colloquially as the "continental treble":
  - (Scotland) Celtic in 1967, having won the European Cup, the Scottish First Division, and the Scottish Cup
  - (Netherlands) Ajax in 1972 won the European Cup, the Eredivisie, and the KNVB Cup
  - (Netherlands) PSV Eindhoven in 1988 did likewise, having won the European Cup, the Eredivisie, and the KNVB Cup
  - (England) Manchester United in 1999, having won the Premier League, the FA Cup, and the Champions League
  - (Spain) Barcelona in 2009, which included La Liga, the Copa del Rey, and the Champions League
  - (Italy) Inter Milan in 2010, which included Serie A, the Coppa Italia, and the Champions League
  - (Germany) Bayern Munich in 2013, which included Bundesliga, the DFB-Pokal, and the Champions League
  - (Spain) Barcelona in 2015 won the treble for the second time, having won La Liga, the Copa del Rey, and the Champions League
  - (Germany) Bayern Munich in 2020 became the second club to win multiple trebles, having won the Bundesliga, the DFB-Pokal, and the Champions League
  - (England) Manchester City in 2023, which included the Premier League, the FA Cup, and the Champions League
  - Paris Saint-Germain in 2025, which included the Ligue 1, the Coupe de France, and the Champions League
  - (England) Liverpool in 1984 won the English First Division and the European Cup. However, this 'treble' included the Football League Cup rather than the FA Cup.
  - (Germany) Bayern Munich in 2001 won the Bundesliga and the Champions League. However, this 'treble' included the DFB-Ligapokal rather than the DFB-Pokal.
- In addition to this treble, several of these clubs went on to win further cups. However, most of these cups were technically won the following year following the conclusion of regular domestic or international leagues the year before. Also, several domestic cups may not have been extant at the time that equivalent cups were won by clubs of other nations, and in some cases they remain so. Furthermore, there is much variance in the regard with which several cups are taken both over time and between nations. Regardless, the following clubs all won competitions further to the treble mentioned above:
  - (Scotland) Celtic also won their secondary domestic cup competition, the Scottish League Cup, in the 1966–67 season and it is the only European club historically that was able to achieve four major titles in one season (UEFA Champions League, top national league, the main domestic cup competition, and the second domestic cup championship; This does not include the previous season's competitions, for example; Super Cups), thus making their achievement unique in this respect to every other club. In addition, they also managed to win the Glasgow Cup, a regional competition, sometimes colloquially referred to as a part of "the quintuple".
  - (Netherlands) Ajax also won the Intercontinental Cup (the predecessor of the FIFA Club World Cup and the de facto premier global club cup) and the inaugural (and technically unofficial) UEFA Super Cup the following season, forming part of a quintuple of Cup successes; they thus won all available cups to them.
  - (England) Manchester United won the Intercontinental Cup the following season, winning a quadruple of cups.
  - (Spain) Barcelona won the FIFA Club World Cup, the UEFA Super Cup, and the Supercopa de España the following season, making it a sextuple of cup successes, and thus winning all available cups to them.
  - (Germany) Bayern Munich won the DFL-Supercup in the start of the 2012–13 season, the UEFA Super Cup in 2013 and the FIFA Club World Cup in the same year, winning a quintuple of cups.
  - (Italy) Inter Milan completed the quintuple by winning Serie A, the Coppa Italia, the Champions League, the FIFA Club World Cup, and the Supercoppa Italiana.
  - (Spain) Barcelona completed their quintuple in 2015 by lifting La Liga, the Copa del Rey, the Champions League, the UEFA Super Cup, and the Club World Cup.
  - (Germany) Bayern Munich also won the European Super Cup and the DFL-Supercup in 2020, and the FIFA Club World Cup in February 2021 to become the second sextuple-winning club after Barcelona.
  - (England) Manchester City also won the UEFA Super Cup and the FIFA Club World Cup.
  - (France) Paris Saint-Germain also won the FIFA Intercontinental Cup, the UEFA Super Cup and the Trophée des Champions, to become the third sextuple-winning club after Barcelona and Bayern Munich.
- Chelsea are the only club which won the four major UEFA competitions, namely Champions League/European Cup, Cup Winners' Cup, Europa League/UEFA Cup, and Conference League.
  - Other clubs including: Juventus, Ajax, Bayern Munich, and Manchester United are also the only teams to have won the original three major UEFA competitions, namely Champions League/European Cup, Cup Winners' Cup, and Europa League/UEFA Cup.
- Until the first staging of the UEFA Europa Conference League in 2022, Juventus was the first and only club in football history to have won all six official UEFA-sanctioned tournaments, a record claimed after their 1999 Intertoto Cup victory. (Note: In addition, Juventus was the first club to have won all possible continental competitions (e.g. the international tournaments organized by any confederation and held exclusively in its region) and the club world title.)

=== Best debuts ===
Five clubs managed to win the European Cup on their debut:

- (Spain) Real Madrid (1955–56)
- (Italy) Inter Milan (1963–64)
- (Scotland) Celtic (1966–67)
- (England) Nottingham Forest (1978–79)
- (England) Aston Villa (1981–82)

Three clubs won the Champions League on their debut:

- (France) Marseille (1992–93)
- (Netherlands) Ajax (1994–95)
- (Italy) Juventus (1995–96)

Two clubs have won the European Cup on their debut without losing a single game in the competition:

- (Italy) Inter Milan (1963–64) with seven wins and two draws
- (England) Nottingham Forest (1978–79) with six wins and three draws

=== Biggest wins ===
- Biggest margin of victory: **11**
  - (Romania) Dinamo București 11–0 (Northern Ireland) Crusaders, first round, 1973–74
- Most goals scored by a team in a match: **12**
  - (Netherlands) Feyenoord 12–2 (Iceland) KR Reykjavík, first round, 1969–70
- Biggest margin of victory in the Champions League: **10**
  - (Finland) HJK 10–0 (Wales) Bangor City, second qualifying, 2011–12
- Biggest margin of victory in the group stage (1991–92 to 2023–24): **8**
  - (England) Liverpool 8–0 (Turkey) Beşiktaş, 2007–08
  - (Spain) Real Madrid 8–0 (Sweden) Malmö FF, 2015–16
- Biggest margin of victory in the league phase (which replaced the group stage in 2024–25): **8**
  - (Italy) Como 9–1 (France) Lens, league phase, 2026–27
- Biggest margin of victory in the knockout phase of the Champions League era: **7**
  - (Germany) Bayern Munich 7–0 (Switzerland) Basel, round of 16, 2011–12
  - (Germany) Bayern Munich 7–0 (Ukraine) Shakhtar Donetsk, round of 16, 2014–15
  - (England) Manchester City 7–0 (Germany) Schalke 04, round of 16, 2018–19
  - (England) Manchester City 7–0 (Germany) RB Leipzig, round of 16, 2022–23
  - (France) Paris Saint-Germain 7–0 (France) Brest, knockout phase play-offs, 2024–25
- Biggest margin of victory in the quarter-finals: **8**
  - (Spain) Real Madrid 8–0 (Spain) Sevilla, 1957–58
- Biggest margin of victory in the quarter-finals in Champions League era: **6**
  - (England) Manchester United 7–1 (Italy) Roma, 2006–07
  - (Germany) Bayern Munich 8–2 (Spain) Barcelona, 2019–20
- Biggest margin of victory in the semi-finals: **6**
  - (Spain) Real Madrid 6–0 (Switzerland) Zürich, 1963–64
- Biggest margin of victory in the semi-finals in Champions League era: **4**
  - (Germany) Bayern Munich 4–0 (Spain) Barcelona, 2012–13
  - (Spain) Real Madrid 4–0 (Germany) Bayern Munich, 2013–14
  - (England) Liverpool 4–0 (Spain) Barcelona, 2018–19
  - (England) Manchester City 4–0 (Spain) Real Madrid, 2022–23
- Biggest margin of victory in a final: **5**
  - (France) Paris Saint-Germain 5–0 (Italy) Inter Milan, 2025
- Biggest margin of victory for an away side in the Champions League era: **8**
  - (Italy) Como 9–1 (France) Lens, league phase, 2026–27

=== Biggest two leg wins ===
- Highest aggregate margin of victory : **18** – (Portugal) Benfica v (Luxembourg) Stade Dudelange, 18–0 (8–0 away, 10–0 at home), preliminary round, 1965–66
- Highest aggregate margin of victory in group stage: **12** – (Ukraine) Shakhtar Donetsk v (Belarus) BATE Borisov, 12–0 (7–0 away, 5–0 at home), 2014–15
- Highest aggregate margin of victory in the knockout phase of the Champions League era: **11** – (Germany) Bayern Munich v (Portugal) Sporting CP, 12–1 (5–0 away, 7–1 at home), round of 16, 2008–09
- Highest aggregate margin of victory in the quarter-finals: **8** – (Spain) Real Madrid v (Spain) Sevilla, 10–2 (8–0 at home, 2–2 away), 1957–58
- Highest aggregate margin of victory in the quarter-finals of the Champions League era: **6**
  - (Germany) Bayern Munich v (Germany) Kaiserslautern, 6–0 (2–0 at home, 4–0 away), 1998–99
  - (Germany) Bayern Munich v (Spain) Barcelona, 8–2 (single game at neutral venue), 2019–20
  - (Spain) Real Madrid v (Cyprus) APOEL, 8–2 (3–0 away, 5–2 at home), 2011–12
- Highest aggregate win in semi-final by a margin: **8** – (West Germany) Eintracht Frankfurt v (Scotland) Rangers, 12–4 (6–1 at home, 6–3 away), 1959–60
- Highest aggregate margin of victory in the semi-finals of the Champions League era: **7** – (Germany) Bayern Munich v (Spain) Barcelona, 7–0 (4–0 at home, 3–0 away), 2012–13

=== Deciding drawn ties ===
==== Play-offs ====
- First play-off match: (West Germany) Borussia Dortmund 7–0 Spora Luxembourg, preliminary round, 1956–57, after the first two games between the sides had ended 5–5 on aggregate (4–3 win for Dortmund, 2–1 win for Spora).
- Last play-off match: (Netherlands) Ajax 3–0 (Portugal) Benfica, quarter-finals, 1968–69, after the first two games between the sides had ended 4–4 on aggregate (3–1 win for Benfica, 3–1 win for Ajax).
- First (and only) replayed final: (West Germany) Bayern Munich 4–0 (Spain) Atlético Madrid, 1974, following a 1–1 in the first meeting after extra time.
- A total of 32 play-offs have been played. Real Madrid is the only team to have won three play-offs, doing so in 1956–57, 1958–59 and 1961–62, and progressing to the final in all three seasons. Feyenoord is the only team to win two play-offs in the same season, beating Servette in the preliminary round and Vasas in the first round in 1962–63. Wismut Karl-Marx-Stadt and Atlético Madrid have played the most overall play-offs, with four each.

==== Coin toss ====
- First coin toss occurred: (East Germany) Wismut Karl-Marx-Stadt v (Poland) Gwardia Warsaw, 1957–58, after their play-off was abandoned after 100 minutes due to floodlight power failure.
- (Switzerland) Zürich won a coin toss against (Turkey) Galatasaray in 1963–64 after their play-off match ended 2–2. This was the first time this rule was used for a draw played to completion.
- Last coin toss occurred: (Turkey) Galatasaray v (Czechoslovakia) Spartak Trnava and (Scotland) Celtic v (Portugal) Benfica, both in the second round, 1969–70, Celtic later progressed to the final.
- A total of seven European Cup ties were decided by a coin toss, with Galatasaray being the only team to be involved twice, winning one and losing one.

==== Away goals ====
- First instance of the away goals rule: (Iceland) Valur v (Luxembourg) Jeunesse Esch and (Portugal) Benfica v (Northern Ireland) Glentoran, both in the first round, 1967–68, Benfica later progressed to the final.
- In 2002–03, Milan and Inter met in the semi-finals. Sharing the same stadium (San Siro), they drew 0–0 in the first leg and 1–1 in the second. However, Milan were the designated away side in the latter, and thus became the only team to win on "away" goals without having scored a goal away from their own stadium.
- Last instance of the away goals rule: (France) Paris Saint-Germain v (Germany) Bayern Munich, quarter-final, 2020–21
- Milan, Paris Saint-Germain and Porto are the only teams to have advanced on the away goals rule after extra time:
  - In the semi-finals against Bayern Munich in 1989–90, Milan won 1–0 at home and were 0–1 down after 90 minutes in the second leg. Both teams scored one goal each in extra time, giving Milan the victory on away goals.
  - In the round of 16 against Chelsea in 2014–15, Paris Saint-Germain drew 1–1 both home and away. Both teams scored one goal each in the extra time period played in London, giving Paris Saint-Germain the victory on away goals.
  - In the round of 16 against Juventus in 2020–21 (the last season the away goals rule was used), Porto won 2–1 at home and were 1–2 down after 90 minutes in the second leg. Both teams scored one goal each in the extra time period played in Turin, giving Porto the victory on away goals.

==== Penalty shoot-out ====
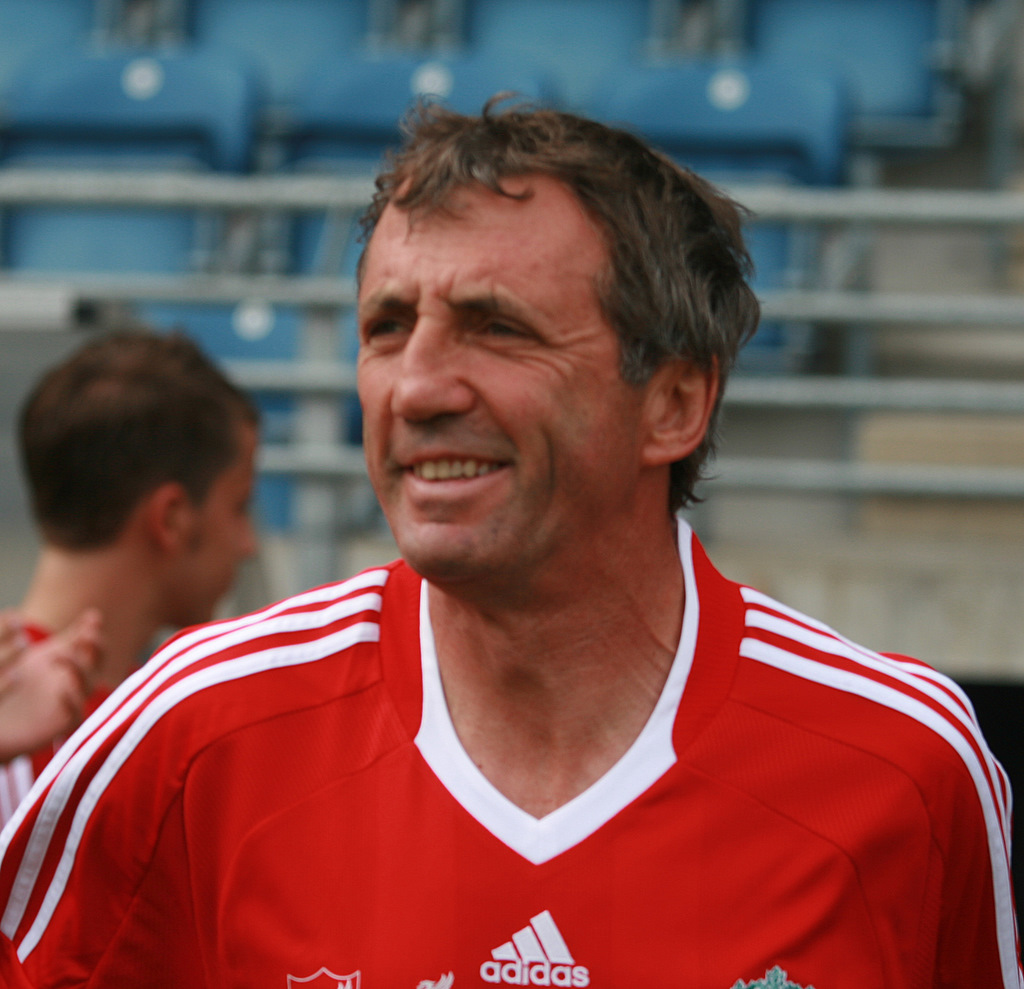
Alan Kennedy scored the decisive penalty kick in the 1984 final.

- First penalty shoot-out: (England) Everton v (West Germany) Borussia Mönchengladbach, 4 November 1970. Gladbach's Klaus-Dieter Sieloff was the first player to score from a penalty kick, while Everton's Joe Royle was the first to miss. Everton went on to win 4–3 with Sandy Brown scoring the decisive goal.
- First penalty shoot-out in a final: (England) Liverpool v (Italy) Roma, 1984 final, following a 1–1 draw after extra time. Roma's Agostino Di Bartolomei was the first player to score, while Liverpool's Steve Nicol was the first to miss. Liverpool went on to win 4–2, with Alan Kennedy scoring the decisive penalty. Kennedy had also scored the winning goal in the 1981 final.
- Twelve finals have been decided by a penalty shoot-out. Liverpool is the only team to have won more than once (1984 and 2005), while Juventus, Milan, Bayern Munich and Chelsea have won one and lost one. No team has lost twice.
- Barcelona, Bayern Munich and Atlético Madrid are the only teams to have been involved in two penalty shoot-outs in the same season. In 1985–86, Barcelona beat IFK Göteborg in the semi-finals, but lost to Steaua București in the final. In 2011–12, Bayern Munich beat Real Madrid in the semi-finals, but lost to Chelsea in the final. In 2015–16, Atlético Madrid beat PSV Eindhoven in the round of 16, but lost to Real Madrid in the final.
- Games that ended with a penalty shoot-out in all-time of the tournament:
  - (England) Everton 4–3 (West Germany) Borussia Mönchengladbach (1970–71, second round)
  - (Scotland) Celtic 4–5 (Italy) Inter Milan (1971–72, semi-finals)
  - (Sweden) Atvidabergs FF 3–4 (West Germany) Bayern Munich (1973–74, first round)
  - (Hungary) Újpest 4–3 (Czechoslovakia) Spartak Trnava (1973–74, quarter-finals)
  - (East Germany) 1. FC Magdeburg 1–2 (Sweden) Malmö FF (1975–76, first round)
  - (Soviet Union) Torpedo Moscow 1–4 (Portugal) Benfica (1977–78, first round)
  - (Italy) Juventus 3–0 (Netherlands) Ajax (1977–78, quarter-finals)
  - (East Germany) Dynamo Dresden 5–4 (Socialist Federal Republic of Yugoslavia) Partizan (1978–79, first round)
  - (England) Liverpool 4–2 (Italy) Roma (1983–84, final)
  - (East Germany) BFC Dynamo 5–4 (Scotland) Aberdeen (1984–85, first round)
  - (Soviet Union) Dnipro Dnipropetrovsk 3–5 (France) Bordeaux (1984–85, quarter-finals)
  - (Spain) Barcelona 5–4 (Sweden) IFK Göteborg (1985–86, semi-finals)
  - (Romania) Steaua București 2–0 (Spain) Barcelona (1985–86, final)
  - (Italy) Juventus 1–3 (Spain) Real Madrid (1986–87, second round)
  - (Netherlands) PSV Eindhoven 6–5 (Portugal) Benfica (1987–88, final)
  - (Switzerland) Neuchâtel Xamax 3–0 (Greece) Larisa (1988–89, second round)
  - (Socialist Federal Republic of Yugoslavia) Red Star Belgrade 2–4 (Italy) Milan (1988–89, second round)
  - (Soviet Union) Spartak Moscow 5–3 (Italy) Napoli (1990–91, second round)
  - (Sweden) Malmö FF 4–5 (East Germany) Dynamo Dresden (1990–91, second round)
  - (Socialist Federal Republic of Yugoslavia) Red Star Belgrade 5–3 (France) Marseille (1990–91, final)
  - (Netherlands) Ajax 2–4 (Italy) Juventus (1995–96, final)
  - (Germany) Bayern Munich 5–4 (Spain) Valencia (2000–01, final)
  - (Italy) Juventus 2–3 (Italy) Milan (2002–03, final)
  - (Netherlands) PSV Eindhoven 4–2 (France) Lyon (2004–05, quarter-finals)
  - (Italy) Milan 2–3 (England) Liverpool (2004–05, final)
  - (England) Liverpool 4–1 (England) Chelsea (2006–07, semi-finals)
  - (Spain) Sevilla 2–3 (Turkey) Fenerbahçe (2007–08, round of 16)
  - (Portugal) Porto 1–4 (Germany) Schalke 04 (2007–08, round of 16)
  - (England) Manchester United 6–5 (England) Chelsea (2007–08, final)
  - (Italy) Roma 6–7 (England) Arsenal (2008–09, round of 16)
  - (Cyprus) APOEL 4–3 (France) Lyon (2011–12, round of 16)
  - (Spain) Real Madrid 1–3 (Germany) Bayern Munich (2011–12, semi-finals)
  - (Germany) Bayern Munich 3–4 (England) Chelsea (2011–12, final)
  - (Spain) Atlético Madrid 3–2 (Germany) Bayer Leverkusen (2014–15, round of 16)
  - (Spain) Atlético Madrid 8–7 (Netherlands) PSV Eindhoven (2015–16, round of 16)
  - (Spain) Real Madrid 5–3 (Spain) Atlético Madrid (2015–16, final)
  - (England) Arsenal 4–2 (Portugal) Porto (2023–24, round of 16)
  - (Spain) Atlético Madrid 3–2 (Italy) Inter Milan (2023–24, round of 16)
  - (England) Manchester City 3–4 (Spain) Real Madrid (2023–24, quarter-finals)
  - (England) Liverpool 1–4 (France) Paris Saint-Germain (2024–25, round of 16)
  - (Spain) Atlético Madrid 2–4 (Spain) Real Madrid (2024–25, round of 16)
  - (France) Paris Saint-Germain 4–3 (England) Arsenal (2025–26, final)
- Two teams were involved in five penalty shoot-outs: Atlético Madrid and Real Madrid.
- Real Madrid (out of five) is the only team to have won four penalty shoot-outs.
- Seven teams have lost two penalty shoot-outs: Ajax (two out of two), Juventus (two out of four), Roma (two out of two), Chelsea (two out of three), Lyon (two out of two), Porto (two out of two), and Atlético Madrid (two out of five). Ajax, Roma, Lyon and Porto are the only teams to have played in multiple shoot-outs and failed to have won any.

==== Extra time ====
- Most matches requiring extra time: **14** – (Spain) Real Madrid; nine of these were decided by the end of extra time, and five went to penalty shoot-outs.
- Most matches requiring extra time in a final: **3**
  - (Italy) Milan (1958, 2003 and 2005)
  - (Germany) Bayern Munich (1974, 2001 and 2012)
  - (Spain) Real Madrid (1958, 2014 and 2016)
  - (Spain) Atlético Madrid (1974, 2014 and 2016)
- Eighteen finals have gone to extra time. One was replayed and twelve went to a penalty shoot-out, while the remaining five were decided after 120 minutes:
  - (Spain) Real Madrid 3–2 (Italy) Milan, 1958
  - (England) Manchester United 4–1 (Portugal) Benfica, 1968
  - (Netherlands) Feyenoord 2–1 (Scotland) Celtic, 1970
  - (Spain) Barcelona 1–0 (Italy) Sampdoria, 1992
  - (Spain) Real Madrid 4–1 (Spain) Atlético Madrid, 2014

=== Most goals in a match ===
- Most goals scored in a single match: **14** – (Netherlands) Feyenoord 12–2 (Iceland) KR Reykjavík, first round, 1969–70
- Most goals scored in a single match in the Champions League era: **12** – (Germany) Borussia Dortmund 8–4 (Poland) Legia Warsaw, group stage, 2016–17
- Most goals scored in a knockout phase match in the Champions League era: **10** – (Germany) Bayern Munich 8–2 (Spain) Barcelona, quarter-finals, 2019–20
- Most goals scored in a final: **10** – (Spain) Real Madrid 7–3 (West Germany) Eintracht Frankfurt, 1960 final
- Most goals scored in a final in the Champions League era: **6** – (England) Liverpool 3–3 (Italy) Milan, 2005 final

=== Highest scoring draws ===
- Highest scoring draw: **8**
  - (Hungary) Vörös Lobogó 4–4 (France) Reims, quarter-finals, 1955–56
  - (Germany) Hamburger SV 4–4 (Italy) Juventus, first group stage, 2000–01
  - (England) Chelsea 4–4 (England) Liverpool, quarter-finals, 2008–09
  - (Germany) Bayer Leverkusen 4–4 (Italy) Roma, group stage, 2015–16
  - (England) Chelsea 4–4 (Netherlands) Ajax, group stage, 2019–20
  - (Italy) Juventus 4–4 (Germany) Borussia Dortmund, league phase, 2025–26

=== More European Cups than domestic league titles ===
- (England) Nottingham Forest are the only club to have won the European Cup more times (twice) than they have won their own domestic league (once). Forest won the Football League in 1978, before winning the European Cup in 1979 and defending it in 1980. Nottingham Forest are also the only previous winners of the European Cup to be later relegated to the third tier of their national league (in 2005).

=== Not winning the domestic league ===
- The competition format was changed in 1997–98 to allow teams that were not champions of their domestic league nor reigning title holders to compete in the tournament. Since then there have been European Champions who had neither been domestic nor continental champions:
  - (England) Manchester United's treble-winners of 1998–99 were the first winners of the tournament to have won neither their domestic title nor the European Cup/Champions League the previous season. Since then:
    - (Spain) Real Madrid (1999–2000, 2013–14, 2015–16, 2021–22 and 2023–24)
    - (Italy) Milan (2002–03 and 2006–07)
    - (England) Liverpool (2004–05 and 2018–19)
      - Liverpool's 2018–19 triumph came 29 years after their previous domestic league title (1989–90). This was the longest time any Champions League winner had gone since previously winning their league, breaking the record Liverpool set in 2004–05, which was fifteen years after their last league title. They would eventually win their next league title in the following season.
    - (Spain) Barcelona (2008–09 and 2014–15)
    - (England) Chelsea (2011–12 and 2020–21)
    - (Germany) Bayern Munich (2012–13)
- 21 clubs have qualified for the UEFA Champions League group stage/league phase despite not having won the domestic league title prior to their debut appearance:
  - (France) Brest, Rennes
  - (Germany) TSG Hoffenheim, Bayer Leverkusen, RB Leipzig, Union Berlin
  - (Italy) Atalanta, Como, Parma, Udinese
  - (Netherlands) Heerenveen
  - (Portugal) Braga
  - (Russia) Krasnodar, Rostov
  - (Spain) Celta Vigo, Girona, Mallorca, Málaga, Villarreal
  - (Switzerland) Thun (Note: Thun later won the domestic league title in 2026.)
  - (Norway) Molde
- (Germany) Bayer Leverkusen (in 2002) is the only club to play in the final having never won their domestic league. They would later win a first league title in 2024.
- There have been ten finals contested where both sides did not win their national league in the previous season:
  - 1999 – (England) Manchester United (2nd) vs (Germany) Bayern Munich (2nd)
  - 2000 – (Spain) Real Madrid (2nd) vs (Spain) Valencia (4th)
  - 2007 – (Italy) Milan (3rd) vs (England) Liverpool (3rd)
  - 2012 – (England) Chelsea (2nd) vs (Germany) Bayern Munich (3rd)
  - 2014 – (Spain) Real Madrid (2nd) vs (Spain) Atlético Madrid (3rd)
  - 2016 – (Spain) Real Madrid (2nd) vs (Spain) Atlético Madrid (3rd)
  - 2019 – (England) Tottenham Hotspur (3rd) vs (England) Liverpool (4th)
  - 2021 – (England) Manchester City (2nd) vs (England) Chelsea (4th)
  - 2022 – (England) Liverpool (3rd) vs (Spain) Real Madrid (2nd)
  - 2024 – (Germany) Borussia Dortmund (2nd) vs (Spain) Real Madrid (2nd)

=== Comebacks ===
==== Group stage ====
- Only two teams have progressed past the group stage after losing their first three games:
  - (England) Newcastle United in 2002–03: In Newcastle's final game against Feyenoord, Craig Bellamy's goal in the first minute of second-half stoppage time secured the 3–2 victory and a place in the second group stage.
  - (Italy) Atalanta in 2019–20: Atalanta managed to advance after losing their first three matches and drawing their fourth.
- Only fifteen teams have progressed past the group stage after losing their first two games. Of these sides, only Galatasaray, Tottenham Hotspur and Atalanta managed to advance past the second round of the tournament.
  - (Ukraine) Dynamo Kyiv in 1999–2000; lost on head-to-head criteria in second group stage to Real Madrid despite having a better goal difference
  - (England) Newcastle United and (Germany) Bayer Leverkusen in 2002–03; placed 3rd and 4th in second group stage respectively
  - (Germany) Werder Bremen in 2005–06; lost to Juventus on away goals (4–4 agg.) in the round of 16
  - (Italy) Inter Milan in 2006–07; lost to Valencia on away goals (2–2 agg.) in the round of 16
  - (France) Lyon in 2007–08; lost 2–1 on aggregate to Manchester United in the round of 16
  - (Greece) Panathinaikos in 2008–09; came back to win the group but lost 3–2 on aggregate to Villarreal in the round of 16
  - (France) Marseille in 2010–11; lost 2–1 on aggregate to Manchester United in the round of 16
  - (Turkey) Galatasaray in 2012–13; lost 5–3 on aggregate to Real Madrid in the quarter-finals
  - (England) Arsenal in 2015–16; lost 5–1 on aggregate to Barcelona in the round of 16
  - (England) Tottenham Hotspur in 2018–19; lost 2–0 to Liverpool in the final
  - (Italy) Atalanta in 2019–20; lost 2–1 to Paris Saint-Germain in the quarter-finals
  - (Portugal) Sporting CP in 2021–22; lost 5–0 on aggregate to Manchester City in the round of 16
  - (Portugal) Porto in 2022–23; came back to win the group but lost 1–0 on aggregate to Inter Milan in the round of 16
  - (Germany) RB Leipzig in 2022–23; lost 8–1 on aggregate to Manchester City in the round of 16
- In 1994–95, defending champions Milan started the group stage with a loss and a win, but were deducted two points for crowd trouble against Casino Salzburg on matchday two. With zero points after two games, they still managed to advance from the group and later to the final, where they lost to Ajax.
- Only three teams have progressed past the group stage without winning any of their first five games:
  - (Italy) Juventus drew their first five games in 1998–99
  - (Netherlands) Feyenoord drew their first five games in 1999–2000
  - (England) Liverpool lost their first game and drew next four games in 2001–02 second group stage

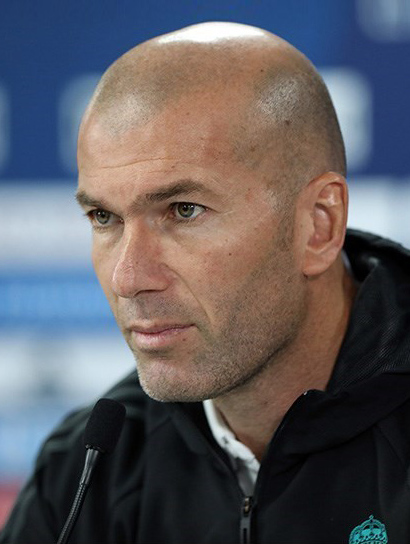
Zinedine Zidane and Juventus drew their first five games in 1998–99.

- Another three teams have progressed past the group stage without winning any of their first four games:
  - (Russia) Lokomotiv Moscow lost three and drew one in 2002–03 (first group stage)
  - (England) Manchester City lost two and drew two in 2014–15
  - (Italy) Atalanta lost three and drew one in 2019–20

==== Two-leg knockout matches ====
- Only one team has lost the first leg of a knockout match by four goals, but still managed to qualify for the next round:
  - (Spain) Barcelona lost 4–0 to Paris Saint-Germain in the first leg of the round of 16 in 2016–17, but won 6–1 in the second leg to advance 6–5 on aggregate
- One additional team was trailing by four goals at some point in a knockout match, but still managed to qualify for the next round:
  - (England) Tottenham Hotspur were trailing 4–0 to Górnik Zabrze after 48 minutes of the first leg in the 1961–62 preliminary round, but managed to finish the game down 4–2 and won 8–1 in the second leg to advance 10–5 on aggregate
- Eighteen teams have lost the first leg of a knockout match by three goals, but still managed to qualify for the next round:
  - (Germany) Schalke 04 lost 3–0 to KB in the 1958–59 first round, but won 5–2 in the second leg and advanced after winning 3–1 in the play-off
  - (Luxembourg) Jeunesse Esch lost 4–1 to Haka in the 1963–64 preliminary round, but won 4–0 in the second leg and advanced 5–4 on aggregate
  - (Socialist Federal Republic of Yugoslavia) Partizan lost 4–1 to Sparta Prague in the 1965–66 quarter-finals, but won 5–0 in the second leg and advanced 6–4 on aggregate
  - (Greece) Panathinaikos lost 4–1 to Red Star Belgrade in the 1970–71 semi-finals, but won 3–0 in the second leg and advanced to the final on away goals
  - (France) Saint-Étienne lost 4–1 to Hajduk Split in the 1974–75 second round, but won 5–1 in the second leg and advanced 6–5 on aggregate
  - (Spain) Real Madrid lost 4–1 to Derby County in the 1975–76 second round, but won 5–1 in the second leg and advanced 6–5 on aggregate
  - (Spain) Barcelona lost 3–0 to Gothenburg in the 1985–86 semi-finals, but won 3–0 in the second leg and advanced after winning 5–4 on penalties
  - (West Germany) Werder Bremen lost 3–0 to Dynamo Berlin in the 1988–89 first round, but won 5–0 in the second leg and advanced 5–3 on aggregate
  - (Turkey) Galatasaray lost 3–0 to Neuchâtel Xamax in the 1988–89 second round, but won 5–0 in the second leg and advanced 5–3 on aggregate
  - (England) Leeds United lost 3–0 to VfB Stuttgart in the 1992–93 first round, but was awarded a 3–0 win in the second leg and advanced after winning 2–1 in the play-off
  - (Denmark) Copenhagen lost 3–0 to Linfield in the 1993–94 first round, but won 4–0 after extra time in the second leg and advanced 4–3 on aggregate
  - (France) Paris Saint-Germain lost 3–0 to Steaua București in the 1997–98 second qualifying round, but won 5–0 in the second leg and advanced 5–3 on aggregate
  - (Poland) Widzew Łódź lost 4–1 to Litex Lovech in the 1999–2000 second qualifying round, but won 4–1 in the second leg and advanced after winning 3–2 on penalties
  - (Albania) KF Tirana lost 3–0 to Dinamo Tbilisi in the 2003–04 first qualifying round, but won 3–0 in the second leg and advanced after winning 4–2 on penalties
  - (Spain) Deportivo La Coruña lost 4–1 to Milan in the 2003–04 quarter-finals, but won 4–0 in the second leg and advanced 5–4 on aggregate
  - (Italy) Roma lost 4–1 to Barcelona in the 2017–18 quarter-finals, but won 3–0 in the second leg and advanced on away goals
  - (England) Liverpool lost 3–0 to Barcelona in the 2018–19 semi-finals, but won 4–0 in the second leg and advanced to the final 4–3 on aggregate
  - (Portugal) Sporting CP lost 3–0 to Bodø/Glimt in the 2025–26 round of 16, but won 5–0 after extra time in the second leg and advanced 5–3 on aggregate
- Another 17 teams were trailing by three goals at some point in a knockout match, but still managed to qualify for the next round:
  - (England) Manchester United were trailing 0–3 to Athletic Bilbao after 43 minutes of the first leg in the quarter-final 1956–57, and then 2–5 after 78 minutes, but managed to finish the game 3–5 and won 3–0 in the second leg and 6–5 on aggregate.
  - (Germany) Hamburger SV were trailing 0–3 to Burnley after 74 minutes of the first leg in the quarter-final 1960–61, but managed to finish the game 1–3 and won 4–1 in the second leg and 5–4 on aggregate.
  - (Czechoslovakia) Spartak Trnava were trailing 0–3 to Steaua București after 51 minutes of the first leg in the first round 1968–69, but managed to finish the game 1–3 and won 4–0 in the second leg and 5–3 on aggregate.
  - Austria Wien were trailing 0–3 to Levski-Spartak after 62 minutes of the first leg in the preliminary round 1970–71, but managed to finish the game 1–3 and won 3–0 in the second leg and 4–3 on aggregate.
  - (Switzerland) Basel were trailing 0–3 to Spartak Moscow after 76 minutes of the first leg in the first round 1970–71, but managed to finish the game 2–3 and won 2–1 in the second leg to qualify on away goals.
  - (Belgium) Anderlecht were trailing 0–3 to Slovan Bratislava after 44 minutes, and 1–4 after 63 minutes of the first leg in the preliminary round 1974–75, but managed to finish the game 2–4 and won 3–1 in the second leg to qualify on away goals.
  - (France) Saint-Étienne were trailing 0–3 to Ruch Chorzów after 46 minutes of the first leg in the quarter-final 1974–75, but managed to finish the game 2–3 and won 2–0 in the second leg and 4–3 on aggregate.
  - (Germany) Borussia Mönchengladbach were trailing 0–3 to Wacker Innsbruck after 27 minutes of the first leg in the quarter-final 1977–78, but managed to finish the game 1–3 and won 2–0 in the second leg to qualify on away goals.
  - (Czechoslovakia) Banik Ostrava were trailing 0–3 to Ferencváros after 47 minutes of the first leg in the first round 1981–82, but managed to finish the game 2–3 and won 3–0 in the second leg and 5–3 on aggregate.
  - (Germany) Bayern Munich were trailing 0–3 to CSKA Sofia after 18 minutes of the first leg in the semi-final 1981–82, but managed to finish the game 3–4 and won 4–0 in the second leg and 7–4 on aggregate.
  - (Spain) Real Madrid were trailing 0–3 to Red Star Belgrade after 39 minutes of the first leg in the quarter-final 1986–87, but managed to finish the game 2–4 and won 2–0 in the second leg to qualify on away goals.
  - (Spain) Real Madrid were trailing 0–3 to Bayern Munich after 47 minutes of the first leg in the quarter-final 1987–88, but managed to finish the game 2–3 and won 2–0 in the second leg and 4–3 on aggregate.
  - (Czechoslovakia) Sparta Prague were trailing 0–3 to Marseille after 60 minutes of the first leg in the second round 1991–92, but managed to finish the game 2–3 and won 2–1 in the second leg to qualify on away goals.
  - (Republic of Ireland) Cork City were trailing 0–3 to Cwmbrân Town after 27 minutes of the first leg in the preliminary round 1993–94, but managed to finish the game 2–3 and won 2–1 in the second leg to qualify on away goals.
  - (France) Monaco were trailing 1–4 to Real Madrid after 81 minutes of the first leg in the quarter-final 2003–04, managed to finish the game 2–4, were trailing 0–1 (2–5 on aggregate) after 36 minutes of the second leg, but won 3–1 to qualify on away goals.
  - (England) Tottenham Hotspur were trailing 0–3 to Young Boys after 28 minutes of the first leg in the play-off round 2010–11, but managed to finish the game 2–3 and won 4–0 in the second leg and 6–3 on aggregate.
  - (England) Tottenham Hotspur were trailing 0–2 (0–3 on agg.) to Ajax after 35 minutes of the second leg in the semi-final 2018–19, but managed to win the game 3–2 to qualify on away goals after a 3–3 aggregate score.
- Four teams lost the first leg of a knockout match by three goals, overcame the deficit in the second leg, but still did not qualify for the next round:
  - (Austria) Rapid Wien lost 4–1 to Milan in the preliminary round 1957–58, won 5–2 in the second leg, but lost 4–2 in the play-off.
  - (Poland) Górnik Zabrze lost 4–1 to Dukla Prague in the preliminary round 1964–65, won 3–0 in the second leg, but lost the coin toss after the play-off ended 0–0.
  - (Portugal) Benfica lost 3–0 to Celtic in the second round 1969–70, won 3–0 in the second leg, but lost the coin toss.
  - (Italy) Juventus lost their home leg of the 2017–18 quarter-finals to Real Madrid 0–3, but then proceeded to score three unanswered goals in the away game to put the aggregate score at 3–3 only to concede a last minute penalty and lose 3–4 on aggregate.
  - (Italy) Juventus lost their away leg of the 2025–26 knockout phase play-offs to Galatasaray 2–5, but then proceeded to score three unanswered goals in the home game to put the aggregate score at 5–5 only to concede two extra-time goals and lose 5–7 on aggregate.
- Two teams were trailing by three goals at some point in a knockout match, overcame the deficit, but still did not qualify for the next round:
  - (Sweden) Gothenburg were trailing 0–3 to Sparta Rotterdam after 48 minutes of the first leg in the round of 16 1959–60, but managed to finish the game 1–3 and won 3–1 in the second leg, only to lose 1–3 in the playoff.
  - (Socialist Federal Republic of Yugoslavia) Red Star Belgrade lost 1–3 to Rangers in the preliminary round 1964–65 and were trailing 0–1 (1–4 on aggregate) after 40 minutes of the second leg, but managed to win the game 4–2, only to lose 1–3 in the playoff.
- Only two teams has lost the first leg of a knockout match at home by two goals, but still managed to qualify for the next round:
  - (Netherlands) Ajax lost 3–1 to Benfica in the first leg of the quarter-finals in 1968–69 at Olympic Stadium, but won 3–1 in the second leg at the Estádio da Luz then won 3–0 in the playoff.
  - (England) Manchester United lost 2–0 to Paris Saint-Germain in the first leg of the round of 16 in 2018–19 at Old Trafford, but won 3–1 in the second leg at the Parc des Princes to advance on away goals Including the European Cup era, only Ajax have additionally managed to achieve this feat; they lost 3–1 at home to Benfica in the first leg of the quarter-finals in 1968–69, but won 3–1 away in the second leg to force a play-off, which they won 3–0 after extra time
- On eight occasions, a team lost the first leg away from home 1–0 and was trailing 1–0 in the second leg at home, but managed to score the three goals required under the away goals rule and qualify for the next round (Or two goals and qualify on penalties shoot-out after removing the away goals rule in 2021–22):
  - (Scotland) Celtic lost 1–0 away to Partizani in the 1979–80 first round and were trailing 1–0 (2–0 on aggregate, with Partizani also having an away goal) after 15 minutes of the second leg, but managed to win the game 4–1 and advance 4–2 on aggregate
  - (Greece) AEK Athens lost 1–0 away to Dynamo Dresden in the 1989–90 first round and were trailing 1–0 (2–0 on aggregate, with Dresden also having an away goal) after 10 minutes of the second leg, but managed to win the game 5–3 and advance 5–4 on aggregate
  - (Netherlands) PSV Eindhoven lost 1–0 away to Steaua București in the 1989–90 second round and were trailing 1–0 (2–0 on aggregate, with Steaua also having an away goal) after 17 minutes of the second leg, but managed to win the game 5–1 and advance 5–2 on aggregate
  - (Spain) Barcelona lost 1–0 away to Panathinaikos in the 2001–02 quarter-finals and were trailing 1–0 (2–0 on aggregate, with Panathinaikos also having an away goal) after eight minutes of the second leg, but managed to win the game 3–1 and advance 3–2 on aggregate
  - (Ukraine) Shakhtar Donetsk lost 1–0 away to Red Bull Salzburg in the 2007–08 third qualifying round and were trailing 1–0 (2–0 on aggregate, with Salzburg also having an away goal) after five minutes of the second leg, but managed to win the game 3–1 and advance 3–2 on aggregate
  - (Belarus) BATE Borisov lost 1–0 away to Debrecen in the 2014–15 third qualifying round and were trailing 1–0 (2–0 on aggregate, with Debrecen also having an away goal) after 20 minutes of the second leg, but managed to win the game 3–1 and advance 3–2 on aggregate
  - (Spain) Real Madrid lost 1–0 away to Paris Saint-Germain in the 2021–22 round of 16 and were trailing 1–0 (2–0 on aggregate) after 39 minutes of the second leg, but managed to win the game 3–1 and advance 3–2 on aggregate
  - (Spain) Atlético Madrid lost 1–0 away to Inter Milan in the 2023–24 round of 16 and were trailing 1–0 (2–0 on aggregate) after 33 minutes of the second leg, but managed to win the game 2–1 and qualify on penalties shoot-out
- On one occasion, a team lost the first leg at home by one goal and was trailing 0–1 in the second leg away from home, but managed to score two or more goals afterwards and progressed to the next round:
  - (France) Paris Saint-Germain lost 2–3 home to Barcelona in the 2023–24 quarter-finals and were trailing 1–0 (4–2 on aggregate) after 12 minutes of the second leg, but managed to win the game 1–4 and advance 4–6 on aggregate

==== Single game ====
- No team has ever managed to escape a loss in a single game after trailing by four or more goals.
- Teams have managed to win a game after trailing by three goals on three occasions:
  - (Germany) Werder Bremen were trailing 3–0 to Anderlecht after 33 minutes in the 1993–94 group stage, but managed to win the game 5–3
  - (Spain) Deportivo La Coruña were trailing 3–0 to Paris Saint-Germain after 55 minutes in the 2000–01 second group stage, but managed to win the game 4–3
  - (Israel) Maccabi Haifa were trailing 3–0 to Aktobe after 15 minutes in the 2009–10 third qualifying round second leg, but managed to win the game 4–3 and advance 4–3 on aggregate
- Teams have managed to tie a game after trailing by three goals on thirteen occasions:
  - (Hungary) Vörös Lobogó were trailing 4–1 to Reims after 52 minutes in the second leg of the 1955–56 quarter-finals, but managed to finish the game 4–4; however, Reims still advanced after winning 8–6 on aggregate
  - (Socialist Federal Republic of Yugoslavia) Red Star Belgrade were trailing 3–0 to Manchester United after 31 minutes in the second leg of the 1957–58 quarter-finals, but managed to finish the game 3–3; however, Manchester United still advanced after winning 5–4 on aggregate
  - (Greece) Panathinaikos were trailing 3–0 to Linfield after 26 minutes in the second leg of the 1984–85 second round, but managed to finish the game 3–3 and advance 5–4 on aggregate
  - (England) Liverpool were trailing 3–0 to Basel after 29 minutes in the 2002–03 first group stage, but managed to finish the game 3–3
  - (England) Liverpool were trailing 3–0 to Milan after 44 minutes in the 2005 final, but managed to finish the game 3–3, and win the final 3–2 on penalties
  - (Israel) Maccabi Tel Aviv were trailing 3–0 to Basel after 32 minutes in the second leg of the 2013–14 third qualifying round, but managed to finish the game 3–3; however, Basel still advanced after winning 4–3 on aggregate
  - (Belgium) Anderlecht were trailing 3–0 to Arsenal after 58 minutes in the 2014–15 group stage, but managed to finish the game 3–3
  - (Norway) Molde were trailing 3–0 to Dinamo Zagreb after 22 minutes in the second leg of the 2015–16 third qualifying round, but managed to finish the game 3–3; however, Dinamo Zagreb still advanced on away goals
  - (Turkey) Beşiktaş were trailing 3–0 to Benfica after 31 minutes in the 2016–17 group stage, but managed to finish the game 3–3
  - (Spain) Sevilla were trailing 3–0 to Liverpool after 30 minutes in the 2017–18 group stage, but managed to finish the game 3–3
  - (England) Chelsea were trailing 4–1 to Ajax after 55 minutes in the 2019–20 group stage, but managed to finish the game 4–4
  - (Italy) Inter Milan were trailing 3–0 to Benfica after 34 minutes in the 2023–24 group stage, but managed to finish the game 3–3
  - (Netherlands) Feyenoord were trailing 3–0 to Manchester City after 53 minutes in the 2024–25 league phase, but managed to finish the game 3–3

=== Defence ===
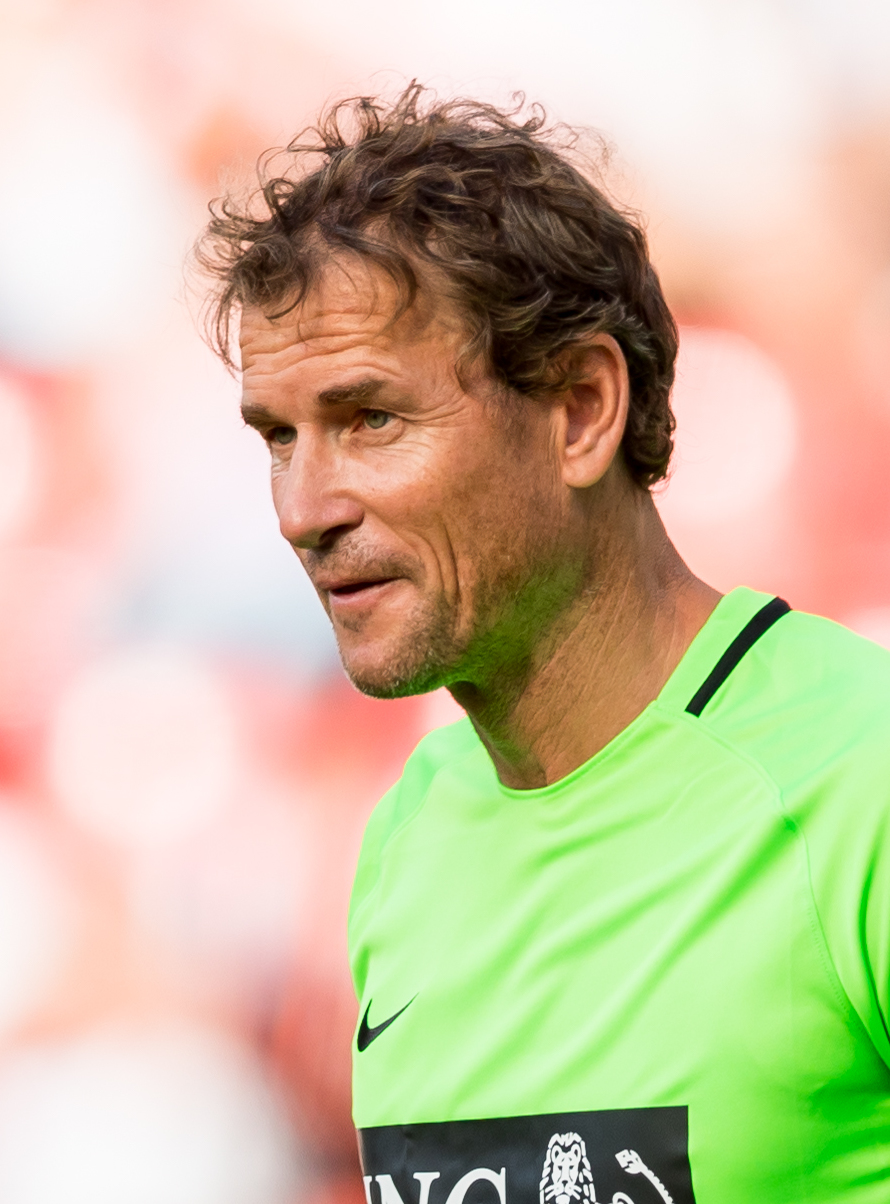
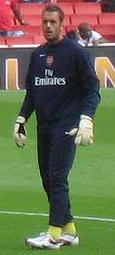
Arsenal goalkeepers Jens Lehmann and Manuel Almunia racked up ten consecutive clean sheets en route to the 2006 final.
- Most clean sheets in a season: **10**
  - (Italy) Milan, 1993–94
  - (England) Arsenal, 2005–06; the most consecutive clean sheets
  - (Spain) Real Madrid, 2015–16; all home matches won without conceding a goal
    - Including qualifying rounds, (Spain) Valencia in the 2000–01 also had 10 clean sheets.
- Longest period without conceding a goal: **995 minutes** – (England) Arsenal, September 2005 – May 2006; the run started after Markus Rosenberg's goal for Ajax in the 71st minute of matchday 2 of the group stage, continued with four group stage games and six games in the knockout rounds, and ended with Samuel Eto'o's goal for Barcelona after 76 minutes in the final. These minutes were split between two goalkeepers: Jens Lehmann (648 minutes) and Manuel Almunia (347 minutes).
- Fewest goals conceded by European Cup-winning team: **2 goals**
  - (England) Aston Villa, 1981–82; in nine matches
  - (Italy) Milan, 1993–94; in twelve matches
- Longest consecutive home clean sheets: **7** – (England) Arsenal, 2 November 2005 – 1 November 2006; conceded one goal during the qualifying rounds.
- Longest consecutive away clean sheets: **7** – (Netherlands) Ajax, 18 October 1995 – 4 December 1996
- Lowest-ever goals conceded-per-game ratio for Champions League-winning: **0.16** – (Italy) Milan, 1993–94; conceded 2 goals in 12 matches.
- Most goals conceded by European Cup-winning team: **17 goals** – (Spain) Real Madrid, 1999–2000
- Most goals conceded in a single season: **30 goals** – (Azerbaijan) Qarabağ, 2025–26; reached the knockout phase play-offs
- Highest-ever goals conceded-per-game ratio for Champions League-winning: **1.57** – (Portugal) Benfica, 1961–62; conceded 11 goals in 7 matches.
- Fewest goals conceded by a finalists: **1 goal** – (Portugal) Benfica, 1987–88
- Longest run without conceding from the start of a campaign: **540 minutes** – (Italy) Inter Milan, 2024–25; the run ended with Nordi Mukiele's goal for Bayer Leverkusen after 90 minutes on matchday 6 of the league phase.

=== Goalscoring records ===
- Most goals in a season: **45 goals**
  - (Spain) Barcelona, 1999–2000
  - (France) Paris Saint-Germain, 2025–26
- Most goals in a season, including qualifying stages: **47 goals** – (England) Liverpool, 2017–18
- Most goals by a Champions League-winning side: **45 goals** – (France) Paris Saint-Germain, 2025–26
- Highest-ever goal-per-game ratio by a Champions League-winning side: **4.4** – (Spain) Real Madrid, 1959–60; scoring 31 goals in 7 matches.
- Fewest goals by a Champions League-winning side: **9 goals** – (Netherlands) PSV Eindhoven, 1987–88
- Fewest-ever goal-per-game ratio by a Champions League-winning side: **1** – (Netherlands) PSV Eindhoven, 1987–88; scoring 9 goals in 9 matches.
- Most goalscorers by a team in a season: **15** – (Germany) Borussia Dortmund, 2016–17
- Most goalscorers by a Champions League-winning side in a season: **14** – (Spain) Real Madrid, 2001–02
- Most goalscorers by a team in a single match: **8** – (West Germany) Borussia Mönchengladbach v Larnaca, 22 September 1970
- First club to reach the 1000th goal: (Spain) Real Madrid; doing so when Karim Benzema scored the first goal in the 14th minute in his team's 2–1 victory against Shakhtar Donetsk in the fourth matchday of the group stage in the 2021–22 season.

=== Meetings ===
- Most faced teams: **30 matches** – (Germany) Bayern Munich v (Spain) Real Madrid, 1976–2026
- Most consecutive faced teams: **5 seasons**
  - (England) Chelsea v (England) Liverpool, 2004–2009
  - (England) Manchester City v (Spain) Real Madrid, 2021–2026
- Clubs that faced each other on four consecutive seasons:
  - Deportivo La Coruña v (Italy) Juventus, 2000–2004 (8 matches involved that half of those resulted in draw, the Spain side won thrice and the Italian won once.)
  - (Spain) Atlético Madrid v (Spain) Real Madrid, 2013–2017 (6 matches involved that half of those won by Real, Atlético only won once and twice in draw.)

=== Penalties ===
- Most penalties awarded in UEFA Champions League era: **67** – (Germany) Bayern Munich
- Most penalties conceded in UEFA Champions League era: **41** – (Spain) Real Madrid
- Most penalties awarded in a match: **4** – (Austria) Red Bull Salzburg v (Spain) Sevilla, group stage, 2021–22; three for Salzburg and one for Sevilla, of which two were scored.
- Most penalties awarded in a final: **3** – (Germany) Bayern Munich v (Spain) Valencia, 2001 final
- Eighteen penalties have been taken in the final of the tournament on fifteen occasions; only the 2001 final had multiple penalties. Thirteen of those have been scored and five have been missed:
  - ✓ 1957: by Alfredo Di Stéfano in the 69th minute for Real Madrid, against Fiorentina
  - ✗ 1959: by Enrique Mateos in the 16th minute for Real Madrid, against Reims
  - ✓ 1960: by Ferenc Puskás in the 56th minute for Real Madrid, against Eintracht Frankfurt
  - ✓ 1962: by Eusébio in the 64th minute for Benfica, against Real Madrid
  - ✓ 1967: by Sandro Mazzola in the 7th minute for Inter Milan, against Celtic
  - ✓ 1969: by Velibor Vasović in the 60th minute for Ajax, against Milan
  - ✓ 1977: by Phil Neal in the 82nd minute for Liverpool, against Borussia Mönchengladbach
  - ✓ 1985: by Michel Platini in the 58th minute for Juventus, against Liverpool
  - ✓ 2001: by Gaizka Mendieta in the 2nd minute for Valencia, against Bayern Munich
  - ✗ 2001: by Mehmet Scholl in the 5th minute for Bayern Munich, against Valencia
  - ✓ 2001: by Stefan Effenberg in the 50th minute for Bayern Munich, against Valencia
  - ✗ 2005: by Xabi Alonso in the 60th minute for Liverpool, against Milan (The penalty was saved but Alonso scored from the rebound.)
  - ✗ 2012: by Arjen Robben in the 95th minute for Bayern Munich, against Chelsea
  - ✓ 2013: by İlkay Gündoğan in the 68th minute for Borussia Dortmund, against Bayern Munich
  - ✓ 2014: by Cristiano Ronaldo in the 120th minute for Real Madrid, against Atlético Madrid
  - ✗ 2016: by Antoine Griezmann in the 47th minute for Atlético Madrid, against Real Madrid
  - ✓ 2019: by Mohamed Salah in the 2nd minute for Liverpool, against Tottenham Hotspur
  - ✓ 2026: by Ousmane Dembélé in the 65th minute for Paris Saint-Germain, against Arsenal

=== Defending the trophy ===
- A total of 71 tournaments have been played: 37 in the European Cup era (1955–56 to 1991–92) and 34 in the Champions League era (1992–93 to 2025–26). 16 of the 70 attempts to defend the trophy (22.86%) have been successful, split between nine teams. These are:
  - (Spain) Real Madrid on six attempts out of fifteen (1956–57, 1957–58, 1958–59, 1959–60, 2016–17, 2017–18)
  - (Portugal) Benfica on one attempt out of two (1961–62)
  - (Italy) Inter Milan on one attempt out of three (1964–65)
  - (Netherlands) Ajax on two attempts out of four (1971–72, 1972–73)
  - (Germany) Bayern Munich on two attempts out of six (1974–75, 1975–76)
  - (England) Liverpool on one attempt out of six (1977–78)
  - (England) Nottingham Forest on one attempt out of two (1979–80)
  - (Italy) Milan on one attempt out of seven (1989–90)
  - (France) Paris Saint-Germain on one attempt out of one (2025–26)
- Between the two eras of this competition, this breaks down as:
  - Of the 36 attempts in European Cup era: 13 successful (36.11%)
  - Of the 34 attempts in the Champions League era: 3 successful (8.82%)
- Two teams have managed to defend the trophy in the Champions League era:
  - (Spain) Real Madrid (twice), who won in 2015–16, 2016–17 and 2017–18
  - (France) Paris Saint-Germain, who won in 2024–25 and 2025–26
- The teams who came closest to defending the trophy but who were unsuccessful, all making it to the final:
  - (Portugal) Benfica in 1962–63
  - (England) Liverpool in 1984–85
  - (Italy) Milan in 1994–95
  - (Netherlands) Ajax in 1995–96
  - (Italy) Juventus in 1996–97
  - (England) Manchester United in 2008–09
- Of the 24 teams that have won the trophy, 15 have never defended it. Only five of these have won the trophy more than once, and so have had more than one attempt to do so. These are:
  - (Spain) Barcelona on five attempts: lost to CSKA Moscow in the second round in 1992–93, to Liverpool in the round of 16 in 2006–07, to Inter Milan in the semi-finals in 2009–10, to Chelsea in the semi-finals in 2011–12, and to Atlético Madrid in the quarter-finals in 2015–16
  - (England) Manchester United on three attempts: lost to Milan in the semi-finals in 1968–69, to Real Madrid in the quarter-finals in 1999–2000, and to Barcelona in the final in 2008–09
  - (Italy) Juventus on two attempts: lost to Barcelona in the quarter-finals in 1985–86, and to Borussia Dortmund in the final in 1996–97
  - (Portugal) Porto on two attempts: lost to Real Madrid in the second round in 1987–88, and to Inter Milan in the round of 16 in 2004–05
  - (England) Chelsea on two attempts: finished behind Juventus and Shakhtar Donetsk in the group stage in 2012–13, and lost to Real Madrid in the quarter-finals in 2021–22
- During the Champions League era, only one title holder has failed to qualify from the group stage:
  - (England) Chelsea in 2012–13
- (France) Marseille were denied the opportunity to defend their title in 1993–94, following their punishment due to the French football bribery scandal.
- Two teams lost consecutive finals:
  - (Italy) Juventus (1997 and 1998)
  - (Spain) Valencia (2000 and 2001)
- Three teams won the tournament after losing the final in the previous season:
  - (Italy) Milan (1993–94)
  - (Germany) Bayern Munich (2012–13)
  - (England) Liverpool (2018–19)
- (Italy) Inter Milan's 2009–10 triumph came 45 years after winning their previous title (1964–65). This was the longest time any Champions League winner had gone since previously winning the tournament.

=== Disciplinary ===
- Most red cards: **32** – (Italy) Juventus
- Most yellow cards in a match: **12** – (Germany) Bayern Munich v (Italy) Juventus, round of 16, 2015–16

=== Own goals ===
- Most own goals: **12** – (Spain) Real Madrid
- Most own goals in a season: **4**
  - (Spain) Girona, 2024–25
  - (Netherlands) Feyenoord, 2024–25
- Most own goals in a match: **3** – (Kazakhstan) Astana v (Turkey) Galatasaray, group stage, 2015–16

=== Finals ===
- Most number of finals two teams have played each other: **3 times**
  - (Spain) Real Madrid v (England) Liverpool; lost 0–1 in 1981, won 3–1 in 2018, won 1–0 in 2022
- Eight other pairs of teams have played each other in two finals:
  - (Spain) Real Madrid v (France) Reims; won 4–3 in 1956 and won 2–0 in 1959
  - (Italy) Milan v (Portugal) Benfica; won 2–1 in 1963 and won 1–0 in 1990
  - (Italy) Milan v (Netherlands) Ajax; won 4–1 in 1969 and lost 0–1 in 1995
  - (Netherlands) Ajax v (Italy) Juventus; won 1–0 in 1973 and lost 1–1 (2–4 on penalties) in 1996
  - (England) Liverpool v (Italy) Milan; won 3–3 (3–2 on penalties) in 2005 and lost 1–2 in 2007
  - (Spain) Barcelona v (England) Manchester United; won 2–0 in 2009 and won 3–1 in 2011
  - (Spain) Real Madrid v (Spain) Atlético Madrid; won 4–1 (a.e.t.) in 2014 and won 1–1 (5–3 on penalties) in 2016
  - (Spain) Real Madrid v (Italy) Juventus; won 1–0 in 1998 and won 4–1 in 2017
- Other than the first season, nine finals were played where neither team had previously won the tournament, with all of them occurring in the European Cup era:
  - 1961: (Portugal) Benfica v (Spain) Barcelona
  - 1971: (Netherlands) Ajax v (Greece) Panathinaikos
  - 1974: (West Germany) Bayern Munich v (Spain) Atlético Madrid
  - 1977: (England) Liverpool v (West Germany) Borussia Mönchengladbach
  - 1979: (England) Nottingham Forest v (Sweden) Malmö FF
  - 1983: (West Germany) Hamburger SV v (Italy) Juventus
  - 1986: (Romania) Steaua București v (Spain) Barcelona
  - 1991: (Socialist Federal Republic of Yugoslavia) Red Star Belgrade v (France) Marseille
  - 1992: (Spain) Barcelona v (Italy) Sampdoria
- On nine occasions, but never in the final, has there been a rematch of the previous season's final at some point in the following season's competition:
  - 1977–78: (England) Liverpool v (West Germany) Borussia Mönchengladbach (semi-finals)
  - 1996–97: (Italy) Juventus v (Netherlands) Ajax (semi-finals)
  - 2010–11: (Italy) Inter Milan v (West Germany) Bayern Munich (round of 16)
  - 2014–15: (Spain) Real Madrid v (Spain) Atlético Madrid (quarter-finals)
  - 2016–17: (Spain) Real Madrid v (Spain) Atlético Madrid (semi-finals)
  - 2017–18: (Spain) Real Madrid v (Italy) Juventus (quarter-finals)
  - 2020–21: (Germany) Bayern Munich v (France) Paris Saint-Germain (quarter-finals)
  - 2022–23: (England) Liverpool v (Spain) Real Madrid (round of 16)
  - 2024–25: (Spain) Real Madrid v (Germany) Borussia Dortmund (league phase)
    - Only one side lost the initial final but won the rematch: Paris Saint-Germain in 2021, who did so on away goals.
- In only two seasons, the eventual finalists had already met in previous stages, in particular the group stage:
  - In 1994–95, Ajax and Milan met in the group stage and later in the final. Ajax won all three matches (2–0 both home and away in the group stage, 1–0 in the final).
  - In the 1998–99 edition, eventual winners Manchester United met Bayern Munich twice in the group stage (both draws) and later in the final.
- Only four clubs have played a final in their home stadium:
  - (Spain) Real Madrid (1957), (Italy) Inter Milan (1965), (Italy) Roma (1984) and (Germany) Bayern Munich (2012)
    - (Spain) Real Madrid (1957) and (Italy) Inter Milan (1965) were the only clubs who won a final in their home stadium.
- On 12 occasions, the host of the final was the home country of a finalist:
  - (Italy) (3x): Inter Milan (1965 at San Siro, Milan); Roma (1984 at Stadio Olimpico, Rome); Juventus (1996 at Stadio Olimpico, Rome)
  - (England) (3x): Manchester United (1968 and 2011 at Wembley Stadium, London); Liverpool (1978 at Wembley Stadium, London)
  - (Spain) (2x): Real Madrid (1957 at Santiago Bernabéu, Madrid); Barcelona (1986 at Ramón Sánchez Pizjuán, Seville)
  - (Germany) (2x): Borussia Dortmund (1997 at Olympiastadion, Munich); Bayern Munich (2012 at Allianz Arena, Munich)
  - (France) (1x): Reims (1956 at Parc des Princes, Paris)
  - (Netherlands) (1x): Ajax (1972 at De Kuip, Rotterdam)
- From the 12 occasions, 7 clubs have won the final in their home country:
  - (Spain) Real Madrid (1957), (Italy) Inter Milan (1965), (England) Manchester United (1968), (Netherlands) Ajax (1972), (England) Liverpool (1978), (Italy) Juventus (1996) and (Germany) Borussia Dortmund (1997)
  - (England) Manchester United is the only club who played two finals in their home country, winning (1968) and losing (2011).

=== Nationalities ===
- Three clubs have won the European Cup/Champions League fielding teams from a single nationality:
  - Benfica twice won the competition (1961 and 1962) with a team consisting entirely of Portuguese players, although some of them had been born in Portuguese African colonies, then Overseas Provinces of Portugal but now independent nations.
  - (Scotland) Celtic won the competition in 1967 with their entire squad born within a 30-mile radius of Celtic Park, their home ground.
  - Steaua București won in 1986 with a team consisting entirely of players from Romania.
    - In addition, (Spain) Real Madrid won the competition in 1966 with Spanish players in the final match lineup, despite the participation of some foreign players in the lower rounds. This generation was called the 'Yé-yé'.
- (Italy) Inter Milan is the only team to have won the European Cup/Champions League fielding a starting line-up composed entirely of foreign players and with a foreign coach in 2010 final: Julio Cesar, Maicon and Lúcio (Brazil), Walter Samuel, Javier Zanetti, Esteban Cambiasso and Diego Milito (Argentine), Cristian Chivu (Romania), Wesley Sneijder (Netherlands), Samuel Eto'o (Cameroon), Goran Pandev (Macedonia), coached by José Mourinho (Portugal).
- (England) Chelsea are believed to be the first club in Champions League history to have fielded a starting line-up composed entirely of foreign players and with a foreign coach, in their 1–2 home loss against Lazio on 22 March 2000. The Chelsea team was: Ed de Goey (Netherlands), Dan Petrescu (Romania), Celestine Babayaro (Nigeria), Frank Leboeuf, Marcel Desailly and Didier Deschamps (France), Gus Poyet (Uruguay), Roberto Di Matteo and Gianfranco Zola (Italy), Albert Ferrer (Spain), Tore André Flo (Norway), coached by Gianluca Vialli (Italy).
- Arsenal are believed to be the first club in Champions League history to have fielded 11 players of different nationalities at the same time, in their 2–1 win away at Hamburger SV on 13 September 2006. The Arsenal team, after the 28th-minute substitution of Kolo Touré, was: Jens Lehmann (Germany), Emmanuel Eboué (Ivory Coast), Johan Djourou (Switzerland), Justin Hoyte (England), William Gallas (France), Tomáš Rosický (Czech Republic), Gilberto Silva (Brazil), Cesc Fàbregas (Spain), Alexander Hleb (Belarus), Emmanuel Adebayor (Togo) and Robin van Persie (Netherlands).

=== Countries ===
- On eight occasions has the final of the tournament involved two teams from the same nation:
  - (Spain) 2000: Real Madrid 3–0 Valencia
  - (Italy) 2003: Milan 0–0 (3–2 p) Juventus
  - (England) 2008: Manchester United 1–1 (6–5 p) Chelsea
  - (Germany) 2013: Bayern Munich 2–1 Borussia Dortmund
  - (Spain) 2014: Real Madrid 4–1 (a.e.t.) Atlético Madrid
  - (Spain) 2016: Real Madrid 1–1 (5–3 p) Atlético Madrid
  - (England) 2019: Liverpool 2–0 Tottenham Hotspur
  - (England) 2021: Chelsea 1–0 Manchester City
- In addition to the eight finals, 36 meetings between teams from the same league have been or will be played:
  - Thirteen meetings from the Spanish league:
    - 1957–58: Real Madrid 10–2 Sevilla, quarter-finals (8–0, 2–2)
    - 1958–59: Real Madrid 2–2 (2–1 in play-off) Atlético Madrid, semi-finals (2–1, 0–1)
    - 1959–60: Real Madrid 6–2 Barcelona, semi-finals (3–1, 3–1)
    - 1960–61: Barcelona 4–3 Real Madrid, first round (2–2, 2–1)
    - 1999–2000: Valencia 5–3 Barcelona, semi-finals (4–1, 1–2)
    - 2001–02: Real Madrid 3–1 Barcelona, semi-finals (2–0, 1–1)
    - 2010–11: Barcelona 3–1 Real Madrid, semi-finals (2–0, 1–1)
    - 2013–14: Atlético Madrid 2–1 Barcelona, quarter-finals (1–1, 1–0)
    - 2014–15: Real Madrid 1–0 Atlético Madrid, quarter-finals (0–0, 1–0)
    - 2015–16: Atlético Madrid 3–2 Barcelona, quarter-finals (1–2, 2–0)
    - 2016–17: Real Madrid 4–2 Atlético Madrid, semi-finals (3–0, 1–2)
    - 2024–25: Real Madrid 2–2 (4–2 p) Atlético Madrid, round of 16 (2–1, 0–1)
    - 2025–26: Atlético Madrid 3–2 Barcelona, quarter-finals (2–0, 1–2)
  - Twelve meetings from the English league:
    - 1978–79: Nottingham Forest 2–0 Liverpool, first round (2–0, 0–0)
    - 2003–04: Chelsea 3–2 Arsenal, quarter-finals (1–1, 2–1)
    - 2004–05: Liverpool 1–0 Chelsea, semi-finals (0–0, 1–0)
    - 2005–06: Liverpool 0–0 Chelsea, group stage (0–0, 0–0)
    - 2006–07: Liverpool 1–1 (4–1 p) Chelsea, semi-finals (1–0, 0–1)
    - 2007–08: Liverpool 5–3 Arsenal, quarter-finals (1–1, 4–2)
    - 2007–08: Chelsea 4–3 Liverpool, semi-finals (1–1, 3–2)
    - 2008–09: Chelsea 7–5 Liverpool, quarter-finals (3–1, 4–4)
    - 2008–09: Manchester United 4–1 Arsenal, semi-finals (1–0, 3–1)
    - 2010–11: Manchester United 3–1 Chelsea, quarter-finals (1–0, 2–1)
    - 2017–18: Liverpool 5–1 Manchester City, quarter-finals (3–0, 2–1)
    - 2018–19: Tottenham Hotspur 4–4 Manchester City, quarter-finals (1–0, 3–4, Tottenham Hotspur won on away goals)
  - Five meetings from the Italian league:
    - 1985–86: Juventus 2–0 Hellas Verona, second round (0–0, 2–0)
    - 2002–03: Milan 1–1 Inter Milan, semi-finals (0–0, 1–1, Milan won on "away" goals)
    - 2004–05: Milan 5–0 Inter Milan, quarter-finals (2–0, 3–0 (match awarded))
    - 2022–23: Milan 2–1 Napoli, quarter-finals (1–0, 1–1)
    - 2022–23: Inter Milan 3–0 Milan, semi-finals (2–0, 1–0)
  - Three meetings from the Bundesliga:
    - 1997–98: Borussia Dortmund 1–0 Bayern Munich, quarter-finals (0–0, 1–0)
    - 1998–99: Bayern Munich 6–0 1. FC Kaiserslautern, quarter-finals (2–0, 4–0)
    - 2024–25: Bayern Munich 5–0 Bayer Leverkusen, round of 16 (3–0, 2–0)
    - There were an additional four meetings between teams from the West German Bundesliga and the East German DDR-Oberliga:
      - 1973–74: Bayern Munich 7–6 Dynamo Dresden, second round (4–3, 3–3)
      - 1974–75: Bayern Munich 5–3 1. FC Magdeburg, second round (3–2, 2–1)
      - 1982–83: Hamburger SV 3–1 BFC Dynamo, second round (1–1, 2–0)
      - 1988–89: Werder Bremen 5–3 BFC Dynamo, first round (0–3, 5–0)
  - Three meetings from the French league:
    - 2009–10: Lyon 3–2 Bordeaux, quarter-finals (3–1, 0–1)
    - 2024–25: Paris Saint-Germain 10–0 Brest, knockout phase play-offs (3–0, 7–0)
    - 2025–26: Paris Saint-Germain 5–4 Monaco, knockout phase play-offs (3–2, 2–2)
- Germany has provided the highest number of participants in the history of the competition (including West and East Germany), including the qualifying stages, with 29 clubs:
  - Saarbrücken, Rot-Weiss Essen, Borussia Dortmund, Wismut Karl-Marx-Stadt, Schalke 04, ASK Vorwärts Berlin, Eintracht Frankfurt, Hamburger SV, 1. FC Nürnberg, Carl Zeiss Jena, Chemie Leipzig, 1. FC Köln, Werder Bremen, 1860 Munich, Eintracht Braunschweig, Borussia Mönchengladbach, Dynamo Dresden, Bayern Munich, 1. FC Magdeburg, BFC Dynamo, VfB Stuttgart, Hansa Rostock, 1. FC Kaiserslautern, Bayer Leverkusen, Hertha BSC, VfL Wolfsburg, RB Leipzig, TSG Hoffenheim and Union Berlin
- England has provided the highest number of participants in the competition in one season with six clubs in 2025–26, including: Liverpool, Arsenal, Manchester City, Chelsea, Newcastle United (European Performance Spot awarded to associations with the highest UEFA coefficient in 2024–25) and Tottenham Hotspur (Europa League winners).
- In 2025–26, England became the first nation to have six representatives in the knockout phase: Liverpool, Arsenal, Manchester City, Chelsea, Newcastle United and Tottenham Hotspur.
- In 2007–08, England became the first nation to have four representatives in the quarter-finals: Arsenal, Chelsea, Liverpool and Manchester United. This feat was repeated by the same four teams in the 2008–09 season, and by Liverpool, Manchester City, Manchester United and Tottenham Hotspur in 2018–19.
- Three nations have provided the highest number of representatives in the semi-finals in one season with three each:
  - Spain in 1999–2000 (Real Madrid, Barcelona and Valencia)
  - Italy in 2002–03 (Inter Milan, Milan and Juventus)
  - England (three times) in 2006–07, 2007–08 (Manchester United, Chelsea and Liverpool) and 2008–09 (Manchester United, Chelsea and Arsenal)
- Spanish teams have won the most titles, with twenty victories shared among two teams: Real Madrid (fifteen) and Barcelona (five).
- Spanish teams provided the highest number of representatives in the finals, with 31 (eighteen for Real Madrid, eight for Barcelona, three for Atlético Madrid and two for Valencia).
- England has provided the most individual winners of the tournament, with six: Manchester United, Liverpool, Nottingham Forest, Aston Villa, Chelsea and Manchester City.
- England has also provided the highest number of different finalists, with nine: the six winners, plus Leeds United, Arsenal and Tottenham Hotspur.
- England has also provided the highest number of different semi-finalists, with ten: the nine finalists, plus Derby County.
- England has the most consecutive titles, with its clubs winning the title in six consecutive seasons from 1976–77 to 1981–82. Spain is followed by five consecutive seasons on two occasions, from 1955–56 to 1959–60 and from 2013–14 to 2017–18, then the Netherlands in four consecutive years from 1969–70 to 1972–73.
- In the 1985–86 season, Spain became the first nation to have three finalists in the three old UEFA competitions: Barcelona in the European Cup, Atlético Madrid in the European Cup Winners' Cup, and Real Madrid in the UEFA Cup final. Real Madrid is the only winner out of the three clubs.
- In the 1989–90 season, Italian clubs won all three of Europe's three major competitions: the European Cup (Milan), the European Cup Winners' Cup (Sampdoria) and the UEFA Cup (Juventus). Juventus faced another side from Italy, Fiorentina, in the 1990 UEFA Cup final.
- In the 2018–19 season, England became the first nation to have all the final places in Europe's two major competitions: Liverpool and Tottenham Hotspur in the 2019 UEFA Champions League final, and Arsenal and Chelsea in the 2019 UEFA Europa League final.
- In the 2022–23 season, Italy became the first nation to have three finalists in the three modern UEFA competitions: Inter Milan in the Champions League, Roma in the Europa League, and Fiorentina in the Europa Conference League. All three sides would go on to lose their respective finals. This is eventually equalled by England in the 2025–26 season, with Arsenal in the Champions League, Aston Villa in the Europa League, and Crystal Palace in the Conference League.

=== Cities ===
- On two occasions has the final of the tournament involved two teams from the same city:
  - (Spain) 2014 (Madrid): Real Madrid vs Atlético Madrid
  - (Spain) 2016 (Madrid): Real Madrid vs Atlético Madrid
- Only two cities have been represented by two teams who have won the competition:
  - (Italy) Milan: Inter Milan (1964, 1965, 2010) and Milan (1963, 1969, 1989, 1990, 1994, 2003, 2007)
  - (England) Manchester: Manchester City (2023) and Manchester United (1968, 1999, 2008)
- (England) London is the only city to have been represented by three teams in the final: Arsenal (runners-up in 2006 and 2026), Chelsea (runners-up in 2008, winners in 2012 and 2021) and Tottenham Hotspur (runners-up in 2019).
- Apart from Milan, Manchester and London, two other cities have been represented by two teams in the final:
  - (Spain) Madrid has been represented by two clubs in nineteen finals, with fifteen wins (1956, 1957, 1958, 1959, 1960, 1966, 1998, 2000, 2002, 2014, 2016, 2017, 2018, 2022, 2024) and three losses (1962, 1964, 1981) for Real Madrid, and three losses for Atlético Madrid (1974, 2014, 2016).
  - (Serbia) Belgrade has been represented by Partizan (runners-up in 1966) and Red Star Belgrade (winners in 1991).
- (Turkey) Istanbul is the only city to have been represented in the group stage by four teams: Beşiktaş, Fenerbahçe, Galatasaray and İstanbul Başakşehir.
- Only two cities have been represented in the group stage by three teams in the same season:
  - (Greece) Athens: Olympiacos, Panathinaikos and AEK Athens in 2003–04
  - (England) London: Chelsea, Arsenal, and Tottenham Hotspur in 2010–11 and 2025–26
- Only one city has been represented in the knockout phase by three teams in the same season: London in 2010–11, when Arsenal, Chelsea and Tottenham Hotspur all progressed to the first knockout round.
- England is the only nation with teams from five cities who have won the competition:
  - Liverpool: Liverpool
  - Manchester: Manchester United, Manchester City
  - Nottingham: Nottingham Forest
  - Birmingham: Aston Villa
  - London: Chelsea
- Cities at the geographical extremes:
  - Easternmost: (Kazakhstan) Almaty – Kairat
  - Southernmost: (Israel) Tel Aviv – Hapoel Tel Aviv and Maccabi Tel Aviv (Note: Including qualifying rounds Hapoel Be'er Sheva from Beersheba, also in Israel, would be the record holder.)
  - Northernmost: (Norway) Bodø – Bodø/Glimt
  - Westernmost: (Portugal) Lisbon – Benfica and Sporting CP (Note: In the European Cup era, the westernmost location was Reykjanesbær – Keflavík.)
- Longest journey in UEFA competitions:
  - Kairat travelled about 4,294 miles (6,911 km) from (Kazakhstan) Almaty to Lisbon to face Sporting CP in the 2025–26 league phase, with the route lengthened by Portugal's ban on flights through Russian airspace following the Russian invasion of Ukraine.
- Apart from the two finals, only eight other derbies between teams of the same city have ever been played:
  - (Spain) 1958–59 (Madrid): Real Madrid vs Atlético Madrid (semi-finals)
  - (Italy) 2002–03 (Milan): Inter Milan vs Milan (semi-finals)
  - (England) 2003–04 (London): Chelsea vs Arsenal (quarter-finals)
  - (Italy) 2004–05 (Milan): Inter Milan vs Milan (quarter-finals) (the second leg was abandoned and awarded to Milan due to disturbances from the Inter fans)
  - (Spain) 2014–15 (Madrid): Real Madrid vs Atlético Madrid (quarter-finals)
  - (Spain) 2016–17 (Madrid): Real Madrid vs Atlético Madrid (semi-finals)
  - (Italy) 2022–23 (Milan): Inter Milan vs Milan (semi-finals)
  - (Spain) 2024–25 (Madrid): Real Madrid vs Atlético Madrid (round of 16)
- The 2002–03 semi-final tie between Milan and Inter Milan was the first time both games of a two-legged tie were played in the same stadium (San Siro), as the teams shared the stadium as their home venue. Milan won via the "away goals" rule, as it was designated as the "away" team that scored more goals in the tie. The teams also played each other in the same stadium in the 2004–05 quarter-finals and 2022–23 semi-finals. However, at the 2022–23 season the away goals rule no longer existed.
  - The same situation occurred three times in the 2020–21 season, due to travel restrictions related to the COVID-19 pandemic: two round of 16 ties (RB Leipzig vs Liverpool and Borussia Mönchengladbach vs Manchester City) saw both legs played at the Puskás Aréna in Budapest (Leipzig and Borussia were the designated "home" teams for the first legs, and Liverpool and Manchester City were for the second), while the quarter-final tie between Porto and Chelsea saw both legs played at the Ramón Sánchez Pizjuán in Seville (Porto were the designated "home" team for the first leg, and Chelsea were for the second).

=== Specific group stage records (1991–2023) ===
- Most goals scored in a group stage: **25**
  - (France) Paris Saint-Germain (2017–18)
- Fewest goals scored in a group stage: **0**
  - (Spain) Deportivo La Coruña (2004–05)
  - (Israel) Maccabi Haifa (2009–10)
  - (Croatia) Dinamo Zagreb (2016–17)
- Fewest goals conceded in a group stage: **1**
  - (Italy) Milan (1992–93)
  - (Netherlands) Ajax (1995–96)
  - (Italy) Juventus (1996–97 and 2004–05)
  - (Spain) Villarreal (2005–06)
  - (England) Liverpool (2005–06)
  - (England) Chelsea (2005–06)
  - (England) Manchester United (2010–11)
  - (France) Monaco (2014–15)
  - (France) Paris Saint-Germain (2015–16)
  - (Spain) Barcelona (2017–18)
  - (England) Manchester City (2020–21)
- Most goals conceded in a group stage: **24**
  - (Belarus) BATE Borisov (2014–15)
  - (Poland) Legia Warsaw (2016–17)
  - (Czech Republic) Viktoria Plzeň (2022–23)
- Highest goal difference in a group stage: **+21**
  - (France) Paris Saint-Germain (2017–18)
- Lowest goal difference in a group stage: **–22**
  - (Belarus) BATE Borisov (2014–15)
- Lowest goal difference while winning a group: **–3**
  - (Austria) Sturm Graz (2000–01) (first group stage)
  - (Belgium) Anderlecht (2000–01) (first group stage)
- Lowest number of points while winning a group: **8**
  - (Italy) Juventus (1998–99)
- Highest goal difference while being last in the group: **+3**
  - (France) Monaco (2000–01) (first group stage)
- Highest number of points while being last in the group: **7**
  - (Netherlands) Ajax (1998–99)
  - (France) Monaco (2000–01) (first group stage)
  - (Italy) Juventus (2001–02) (second group stage)
  - (Spain) Deportivo La Coruña (2002–03) (second group stage)
  - (Belgium) Anderlecht (2003–04)
  - (Ukraine) Dynamo Kyiv (2003–04)
  - (Denmark) Copenhagen (2006–07)
  - (Russia) CSKA Moscow (2018–19)
  - (Russia) Zenit Saint Petersburg (2019–20)

==== Six wins ====
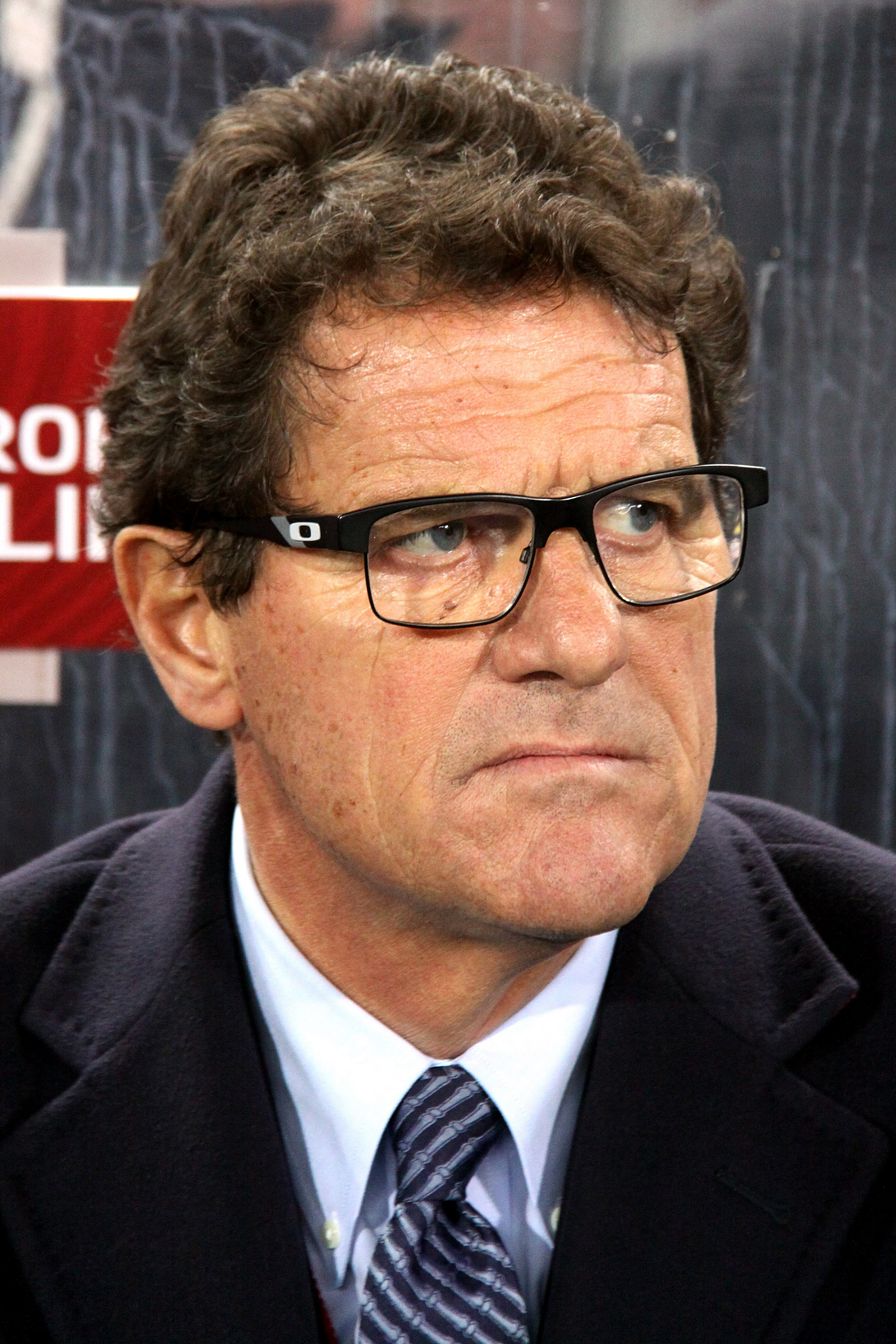
Fabio Capello's Milan became the first side to win all group stage matches in the 1992–93 season.

Nine clubs have won all of their six games in a group stage, on thirteen occasions. Real Madrid and Bayern Munich have done so the most, on three occasions, and the latter are also the only club to have two consecutive six-win group stages:

- (Italy) Milan, 1992–93 (reached the final)
- (France) Paris Saint-Germain, 1994–95 (reached the semi-finals)
- (Russia) Spartak Moscow, 1995–96 (reached the quarter-finals)
- (Spain) Barcelona, 2002–03 (first group stage) (reached the quarter-finals)
- (Spain) Real Madrid has achieved this feat thrice, in 2011–12, 2014–15 (reached the semi-finals on both occasions) and **2023–24** (became the second team to win the tournament after sweeping the group stage)
- (Germany) Bayern Munich has achieved this feat thrice, in **2019–20** (became the first team to win the tournament after sweeping the group stage), 2021–22 and 2022–23 (reached the quarter-finals on both occasions)
- (England) Liverpool, 2021–22 (reached the final)
- (Netherlands) Ajax, 2021–22 (reached the round of 16)
- (England) Manchester City, 2023–24 (reached the quarter-finals)

==== Six draws ====
Only one club has drawn all of their games in a group stage:

- (Greece) AEK Athens, 2002–03 (first group stage, finished 3rd and advanced to the UEFA Cup, where they were eliminated in the fourth round by Málaga)

==== Six losses ====
In the history of the Champions League, the following 23 clubs have lost all group stage matches, Dinamo Zagreb is the only team to do it twice:

- (Slovakia) Košice (1997–98) ended Group B conceding thirteen goals and scoring only twice, with a goal difference of –11.
- (Turkey) Fenerbahçe (2001–02, first group stage) ended Group F conceding twelve goals and scoring three, with a goal difference of –9.
- (Russia) Spartak Moscow (2002–03, first group stage) ended Group B conceding eighteen goals and scoring only once, with a goal difference of –17.
- (Germany) Bayer Leverkusen (2002–03, second group stage) ended Group A conceding fifteen goals and scoring five, with a goal difference of –10. This was the only time that a club lost all matches in the second group stage. It was also the first time that two clubs lost six group stage matches in the same season. Leverkusen had reached the final in the previous season.
- (Belgium) Anderlecht (2004–05) ended Group G conceding seventeen goals and scoring four, with a goal difference of –13.
- (Austria) Rapid Wien (2005–06) ended Group A conceding fifteen goals and scoring three, with a goal difference of –12.
- (Bulgaria) Levski Sofia (2006–07) ended Group A conceding seventeen goals and scoring only once, with a goal difference of –16. This has been the club's only appearance in the group stage to date.
- (Ukraine) Dynamo Kyiv (2007–08) ended Group F conceding nineteen goals and scoring four, with a goal difference of –15.
- (Israel) Maccabi Haifa (2009–10) was the first club to lose all of their group stage matches without scoring a goal. In what was only their second appearance in the competition, they lost 3–0 to Bayern Munich in their first Group A game, and then lost five consecutive games by a score of 1–0, ending the group stage with a goal difference of –8. Although Deportivo La Coruña also scored no goals in Group A in 2004–05, they still collected two points as they twice drew 0–0.
- (Hungary) Debrecen (2009–10) ended Group E conceding nineteen goals and scoring five, with a goal difference of –14.
- (Serbia) Partizan (2010–11) ended Group H conceding thirteen goals and scoring only twice, with a goal difference of –11.
- (Slovakia) Žilina (2010–11) ended Group F conceding nineteen goals and scoring three, with a goal difference of –16. This was the second consecutive season that two clubs had lost all six group stage matches.
- (Croatia) Dinamo Zagreb (2011–12) ended Group D conceding 22 goals and scoring three, with a goal difference of –19.
- (Spain) Villarreal (2011–12) ended Group A conceding fourteen goals and scoring only twice, with a goal difference of –12.
- (Romania) Oțelul Galați (2011–12) ended Group C conceding eleven goals and scoring three, with a goal difference of –8. This was the first season in which three teams lost all six of their group stage matches, and a third consecutive season in which at least two teams finished with zero points.
- (France) Marseille (2013–14) ended Group F conceding fourteen goals and scoring five, with a goal difference of –9.
- (Israel) Maccabi Tel Aviv (2015–16) ended Group G conceding sixteen goals and scoring only once, with a goal difference of –15. Tel-Aviv's only goal came from a penalty.
- (Belgium) Club Brugge (2016–17) ended Group G conceding fourteen goals and scoring only twice, with a goal difference of –12.
- (Croatia) Dinamo Zagreb (2016–17) ended Group H conceding fifteen goals and scoring none, with a goal difference of –15. They became the first club to finish the group stage with zero points on multiple occasions.
- (Portugal) Benfica (2017–18) ended Group A conceding fourteen goals and scoring only once, with a goal difference of –13. They became the first team from Pot 1 to lose all six group stage matches.
- (Greece) AEK Athens (2018–19) ended Group E conceding thirteen goals and scoring only twice, with a goal difference of –11.
- (Turkey) Beşiktaş (2021–22) ended Group C conceding nineteen goals and scoring only three, with a goal difference of –16.
- (Scotland) Rangers (2022–23) ended Group A conceding 22 goals and scoring only two, with a goal difference of –20, which constituted the worst goal difference out of all the performances with losses in all six games.
- (Czech Republic) Viktoria Plzeň (2022–23) ended Group C conceding 24 goals and scoring five, with a goal difference of –19. This equalled the record for most goals conceded in a group stage.

==== Three goals in each match ====
- On 13 December 2023, Manchester City won 3–2 against Red Star Belgrade to become the first team to accomplish this.
- Six other teams have managed to score at least two goals in each match of the group stage, on nine occasions:
  - On 7 December 2010, Tottenham Hotspur drew 3–3 against Twente and became the first team to achieve this feat.
  - Bayern Munich equalled this accomplishment the very next day, after beating Basel 3–0. On 11 December 2019, Bayern won 3–1 against Tottenham to achieve this feat for a second time. On 8 December 2021, Bayern won 3–0 against Barcelona to achieve this feat for a record third time. Bayern achieved this for a fourth time after defeating Inter Milan 2–0 on 1 November 2022, becoming the first team to achieve this feat in two consecutive seasons.
  - Barcelona managed to accomplish this feat on 6 December 2011, after defeating BATE Borisov 4–0.
  - Real Madrid achieved this feat by beating Copenhagen 2–0 on 10 December 2013. On 7 December 2016, Madrid drew 2–2 against Borussia Dortmund to accomplish this for a second time.
  - Ajax managed to accomplish this feat on 7 December 2021, after defeating Sporting CP 4–2.
  - Liverpool accomplished this on the same day as Ajax, after defeating Milan 2–1.

==== Advancing past the group stage ====
- (Spain) Real Madrid hold the record for the most consecutive seasons in which a side have advanced past the group stage, with 27 straight progressions from 1997–98 to 2023–24. They won the title nine times in this period.
- (Spain) Barcelona finished top of their group for a record thirteen consecutive seasons from 2007–08 to 2019–20, and in 18 seasons in total.
- In 2012–13, (England) Chelsea became the first title holders not to qualify from the following season's group stage.
- (France) Monaco scored the fewest goals (four) to earn eleven points in the group stage in 2014–15.
- (Spain) Villarreal won a group with the fewest goals scored (three) in 2005–06, resulting in two wins.

==== Biggest disparity between group winner and runner-up ====
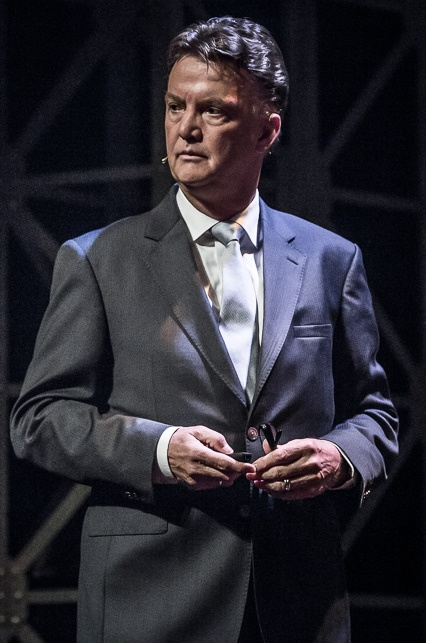
Louis van Gaal's Barcelona won Group H by eleven points in 2002–03.

The biggest points difference between the first- and second-placed teams in a Champions League group phase is eleven points, achieved by four teams:

- (Spain) Real Madrid, 18 points (16:2 goals, +14 GD) in 2014–15 (2nd Basel 7 points, 3rd Liverpool 5 points, 4th Ludogorets Razgrad 4 points). Real Madrid ultimately lost to Juventus in the semi-finals.
- (England) Liverpool, 18 points (17:6 goals, +11 GD) in 2021–22 (2nd Atlético Madrid 7 points, 3rd Porto 5 points, 4th Milan 4 points). Liverpool would go on to lose to Real Madrid in the final.
- (Russia) Spartak Moscow, 18 points (15:4 goals, +11 GD) in 1995–96 (2nd Legia Warsaw 7 points, 3rd Rosenborg 6 points, 4th Blackburn Rovers 4 points). Spartak Moscow lost to Nantes in the next round (quarter-finals).
- (Spain) Barcelona, 18 points (13:4 goals, +9 GD) in 2002–03 (first group stage) (2nd Lokomotiv Moscow 7 points, 3rd Club Brugge 5 points, 4th Galatasaray 4 points). Barcelona went on to win their group in the second group stage with sixteen points, but lost to Juventus in the quarter-finals.

==== Most points achieved, yet knocked out ====
- (France) Paris Saint-Germain, 12 points in 1997–98 (ranked third out of six runners-up, only two advanced)
- (Italy) Napoli, 12 points in 2013–14
- (Norway) Rosenborg, 11 points in 1997–98 (ranked fourth out of six runners-up, only two advanced)
- (Ukraine) Dynamo Kyiv, 10 points in 1999–2000 (second group stage) and 2004–05
- (Germany) Borussia Dortmund, 10 points in 2002–03 (second group stage)
- (Netherlands) PSV Eindhoven, 10 points in 2003–04
- (Greece) Olympiacos, 10 points in 2004–05
- (Germany) Werder Bremen, 10 points in 2006–07
- (England) Manchester City, 10 points in 2011–12
- (England) Chelsea, 10 points in 2012–13
- (Romania) CFR Cluj, 10 points in 2012–13
- (Portugal) Benfica, 10 points in 2013–14
- (Portugal) Porto, 10 points in 2015–16
- (Netherlands) Ajax, 10 points in 2019–20

==== Most points achieved in the group stage, not winning the group ====
- (England) Manchester City, 15 points in 2013–14 (ranked second)
- (Germany) Bayern Munich, 15 points in 2017–18 (ranked second)
- (Spain) Barcelona, 15 points in 2020–21 (ranked second)
- (England) Liverpool, 15 points in 2022–23 (ranked second)
- (France) Paris Saint-Germain, 14 points in 2022–23 (ranked second)
- (England) Arsenal, 13 points in 2014–15 (ranked second)
- (France) Paris Saint-Germain, 13 points in 2015–16 (ranked second)
- (Spain) Real Madrid, 13 points in 2017–18 (ranked second)
- (Spain) Atlético Madrid, 13 points in 2018–19 (ranked second)
- (Spain) Sevilla, 13 points in 2020–21 (ranked second)
- (Portugal) Porto, 13 points in 2020–21 (ranked second)
- (England) Chelsea, 13 points in 2021–22 (ranked second)

==== Fewest points achieved, yet advanced ====
- (Italy) Milan, 5 points in 1994–95 (3 wins and 1 draw, 2 points deducted, 2 points for a win)
- (Russia) Zenit Saint Petersburg, 6 points in 2013–14
- (Italy) Roma, 6 points in 2015–16
- (Poland) Legia Warsaw, 7 points in 1995–96
- (Ukraine) Dynamo Kyiv, 7 points in 1999–2000
- (England) Liverpool, 7 points in 2001–02 (second group stage)
- (Russia) Lokomotiv Moscow, 7 points in 2002–03
- (Germany) Werder Bremen, 7 points in 2005–06
- (Scotland) Rangers, 7 points in 2005–06
- (Turkey) Galatasaray, 7 points in 2013–14
- (Switzerland) Basel, 7 points in 2014–15
- (Italy) Atalanta, 7 points in 2019–20
- (Spain) Atlético Madrid, 7 points in 2021–22

==== Fewest points achieved, yet qualified to UEFA Cup/UEFA Europa League ====
- (Germany) Borussia Dortmund, 2 points in 2017–18

==== Knocked out on tiebreakers ====
Several teams have been knocked out on a tiebreaker, most on the head-to-head criteria:

- (England) Manchester United lost on overall goal difference to Barcelona in 1994–95
- (Austria) Casino Salzburg lost on overall goal difference to Milan in 1994–95, although Milan had been docked 2 points due to crowd trouble (2 points for a win, would have been 2 points behind with 3 points for a win)
- (France) Paris Saint-Germain lost on overall goal difference to Bayern Munich in 1997–98 (second place, only one team advanced directly), and on goal difference to Juventus in the ranking of runners-up
- (Turkey) Galatasaray and Rosenborg lost on head-to-head points to Juventus in 1998–99. Although each team had 8 points, in matches played between the three sides in question, Juventus had 6 points, Galatasaray had 5 points, and Rosenborg had 4 points (only first place team advanced directly)
- (Germany) Bayer Leverkusen lost on head-to-head points to Dynamo Kyiv in 1999–2000 (first group stage)
- (Ukraine) Dynamo Kyiv lost on head-to-head points to Real Madrid in 1999–2000 (second group stage), despite having a better goal difference. Real Madrid went on to win the final.
- (Greece) Olympiacos lost on head-to-head away goals to Lyon in 2000–01 (first group stage), on head-to-head goal difference to Liverpool in 2004–05, and on head-to-head goal difference to Arsenal in 2015–16. In 2004–05, Liverpool went on to win the final.
- (Scotland) Rangers lost on head-to-head points to Galatasaray in 2000–01 (first group stage), despite having a better goal difference
- (France) Lyon lost to Arsenal in 2000–01 (second group stage), and to Ajax in 2002–03 (first group stage), both times on head-to-head points despite having a better goal difference
- (Germany) Borussia Dortmund lost on overall goal difference to Boavista in 2001–02 (first group stage), with both teams winning 2–1 at home in head-to-head matches
- (Spain) Mallorca lost on head-to-head goal difference to Arsenal in 2001–02
- (Italy) Roma lost on head-to-head points to Liverpool in 2001–02 (second group stage), despite having a better goal difference
- (Italy) Inter Milan lost on head-to-head points to Lokomotiv Moscow in 2003–04
- (Netherlands) PSV Eindhoven lost on head-to-head goal difference to Deportivo La Coruña in 2003–04, despite having a better overall goal difference
- (Italy) Udinese lost to Werder Bremen in 2005–06
- (Netherlands) Ajax lost on overall goal difference to Lyon in 2011–12, with both head-to-head games ending in a 0–0 draw. Lyon won their last group game against Dinamo Zagreb 7–1 (after being 0–1 down at half time) while Ajax lost 0–3 against Real Madrid. The aggregate goal difference in both games had to be at least a 7-goal swing for Lyon to advance, and Lyon successfully managed to reach 9.
- (England) Chelsea lost on head-to-head away goals to Shakhtar Donetsk in 2012–13, despite having a better goal difference
- (Romania) CFR Cluj lost on head-to-head points to Galatasaray in 2012–13, despite having a better goal difference
- (Portugal) Benfica lost on head-to-head points to Olympiacos in 2013–14
- (Italy) Napoli lost on head-to-head goal difference to Borussia Dortmund and Arsenal in 2013–14. Although each team had 12 points and 8 points in matches played between the three sides, the goal difference in games played between the three was +1 for Borussia Dortmund, 0 for Arsenal and −1 for Napoli.
- (Germany) Bayer Leverkusen lost on head-to-head points to Roma in 2015–16, despite having a better goal difference
- (Italy) Inter Milan lost on head-to-head away goals to Tottenham Hotspur in 2018–19
- (Italy) Napoli lost on overall goals scored to Liverpool in 2018–19, with both teams winning 1–0 at home in head-to-head matches. Liverpool defeated Napoli in their final group game, with Paris Saint-Germain defeating Red Star Belgrade in the other match to top the group with 11 points. With both Liverpool and Napoli tied on 9 points, having identical head-to-head results, and a goal difference of +2, Liverpool advanced by virtue of having scored more overall goals than Napoli (9 to Napoli's 7). Liverpool went on to win the final.
- (Ukraine) Shakhtar Donetsk lost on head-to-head points to Borussia Mönchengladbach in 2020–21
- (Germany) Borussia Dortmund lost on head-to-head goal difference to Sporting CP in 2021–22
- (Italy) Milan lost on head-to-head goal difference to Paris Saint-Germain in 2023–24

==== Knocked out on 3 points for a win rule ====
1995–96 was the first tournament in which three points were awarded for a win instead of two. The following teams were knocked out from the group stage, but would have advanced following the old rule:

- (Norway) Rosenborg was ranked fourth out of six runners-up in 1997–98, but would have equalled the points of Paris Saint-Germain and eventual finalists Juventus and advanced on goal difference
- (Germany) Bayer Leverkusen ended third in Group A in 1999–2000, but would have been one point ahead of Dynamo Kyiv
- (Greece) Panathinaikos ended third in Group E in 2004–05, but would have equalled the points of PSV Eindhoven and advanced on head-to-head matches
- (Germany) Werder Bremen ended third in Group B in 2008–09, but would have equalled the points of Inter Milan and advanced on head-to-head matches
- (Italy) Napoli ended third in Group C in 2018–19, but would have been one point ahead of eventual winners Liverpool

==== Other records ====
- Most consecutive wins in season-opening fixtures: **23** – (Germany) Bayern Munich, 2003–2026; ongoing
- Most consecutive wins in the group stage: **17** – (Germany) Bayern Munich, 2020–2023
- Most consecutive home wins in the group stage: **17** – (Spain) Barcelona, 2013–2018
- Most consecutive away wins in the group stage: **9** – (Germany) Bayern Munich, 2021–2023
- Most consecutive undefeated matches in the group stage: **41** – (Germany) Bayern Munich, 2017–2024
- Most consecutive home undefeated matches in the group stage: **40** – (Germany) Bayern Munich, 2014–2026; ongoing
- Most consecutive away undefeated matches in the group stage: **20** – (Germany) Bayern Munich, 2017–2024
- Most consecutive clean sheets in the group stage: **8** – (Spain) Real Madrid, 2014–2015
- Most consecutive home clean sheets in the group stage / league phase: **9** – (England) Arsenal, 2023–2025
- Most consecutive away clean sheets in the group stage: **6** – (Netherlands) Ajax, 1995–1998; absent in the 1997–98 season.
- Most clean sheets achieved in a single group stage / league phase: **7** – (Italy) Inter Milan, 2024–25 league phase.
- Most matches played in the group stage in a season: **7** – (Greece) Panathinaikos, 1995–96 group stage; until the 2023–24 season, Panathinaikos is the only team that has ever played seven matches in the group stage (instead of the usual six). After Panathinaikos lost 1–0 away to Dynamo Kyiv on matchday one of the 1995–96 group stage, the Ukrainian team was expelled from the competition by UEFA following Spanish referee Antonio Jesús López Nieto reporting he received a bribe attempt from the side. To replace Dynamo Kyiv in the group stage, UEFA promoted their qualifying round rivals AaB, who were allowed to play a replacement fixture against Panathinaikos in between matchdays three and four. Although this took the total number of group matches played by Panathinaikos to seven, their result against Dynamo Kyiv was annulled.

=== Specific league phase records (2024–) ===
==== Goals ====
- Most goals scored: **28** – (Spain) Barcelona (2024–25)
- Fewest goals scored: **3** – (Switzerland) Young Boys (2024–25)
- Fewest goals conceded: **1** – (Italy) Inter Milan (2024–25)
- Most goals conceded: **27**
  - (Austria) Red Bull Salzburg (2024–25)
  - (Slovakia) Slovan Bratislava (2024–25)
- Highest goal difference: **+19** – (England) Arsenal (2025–26)
- Lowest goal difference: **–22** – (Austria) Red Bull Salzburg (2024–25)

==== Results ====
- All **8** matches won (24 points) – (England) Arsenal (2025–26)
- Most draws: **4**
  - (Italy) Juventus (2025–26)
  - (France) Monaco (2025–26)
- All **8** matches lost (0 points):
  - (Slovakia) Slovan Bratislava (2024–25)
  - (Switzerland) Young Boys (2024–25)
- Most points achieved, yet knocked out: **11** – (Croatia) Dinamo Zagreb (2024–25)
- Fewest points achieved, yet advanced to knockout phase play-offs: **9**
  - (Norway) Bodø/Glimt (2025–26)
  - (Portugal) Benfica (2025–26)
- Most points achieved, yet not a top-eight finish: **15**
  - (Italy) Atalanta (2024–25)
  - (Germany) Borussia Dortmund (2024–25)
  - (Spain) Real Madrid (2024–25 and 2025–26)
  - (Germany) Bayern Munich (2024–25)
  - (Italy) Milan (2024–25)
  - (Italy) Inter Milan (2025–26)

=== Qualifying rounds ===
- Since the addition of a third qualifying round in the 1999–2000 season, four teams have negotiated all three rounds of qualification and reached the Champions League group phase:
  - (England) Liverpool in 2005–06
    - Liverpool went on to become the first team in the history of the competition to reach the knockout phase from the first qualifying round.
  - (Slovakia) Artmedia Bratislava in 2005–06
  - (Cyprus) Anorthosis in 2008–09
  - (Belarus) BATE Borisov in 2008–09
- Since the addition of a fourth 'play-off' round in the 2009–10 season, seven teams have negotiated all four rounds of qualification and reached the Champions League group phase:
  - (Serbia) Red Star Belgrade in 2018–19 and 2019–20
  - (Hungary) Ferencváros in 2020–21
  - (Moldova) Sheriff Tiraspol in 2021–22
  - (Sweden) Malmö FF in 2021–22
  - (Slovakia) Slovan Bratislava in 2024–25
  - (Kazakhstan) Kairat in 2025–26
  - (Azerbaijan) Sabah in 2026–27
- Biggest UEFA ranking disparities in qualifying upsets: 208 places
  - (Moldova) Sheriff Tiraspol (ranked 101) lost 3–4 on aggregate to (Georgia (country)) Saburtalo Tbilisi (ranked 309) in the 2019–20 first qualifying round.
- Biggest aggregate deficit overcome in Champions League qualifying/play-off history: four goals
  - (Austria) LASK trailed 0–3 in the first leg and 0–1 in the second leg against (Scotland) Celtic in the 2026–27 play-off round, winning the second leg 5–1 after extra time to advance 5–4 on aggregate.

=== Winning after playing in a qualifying round ===
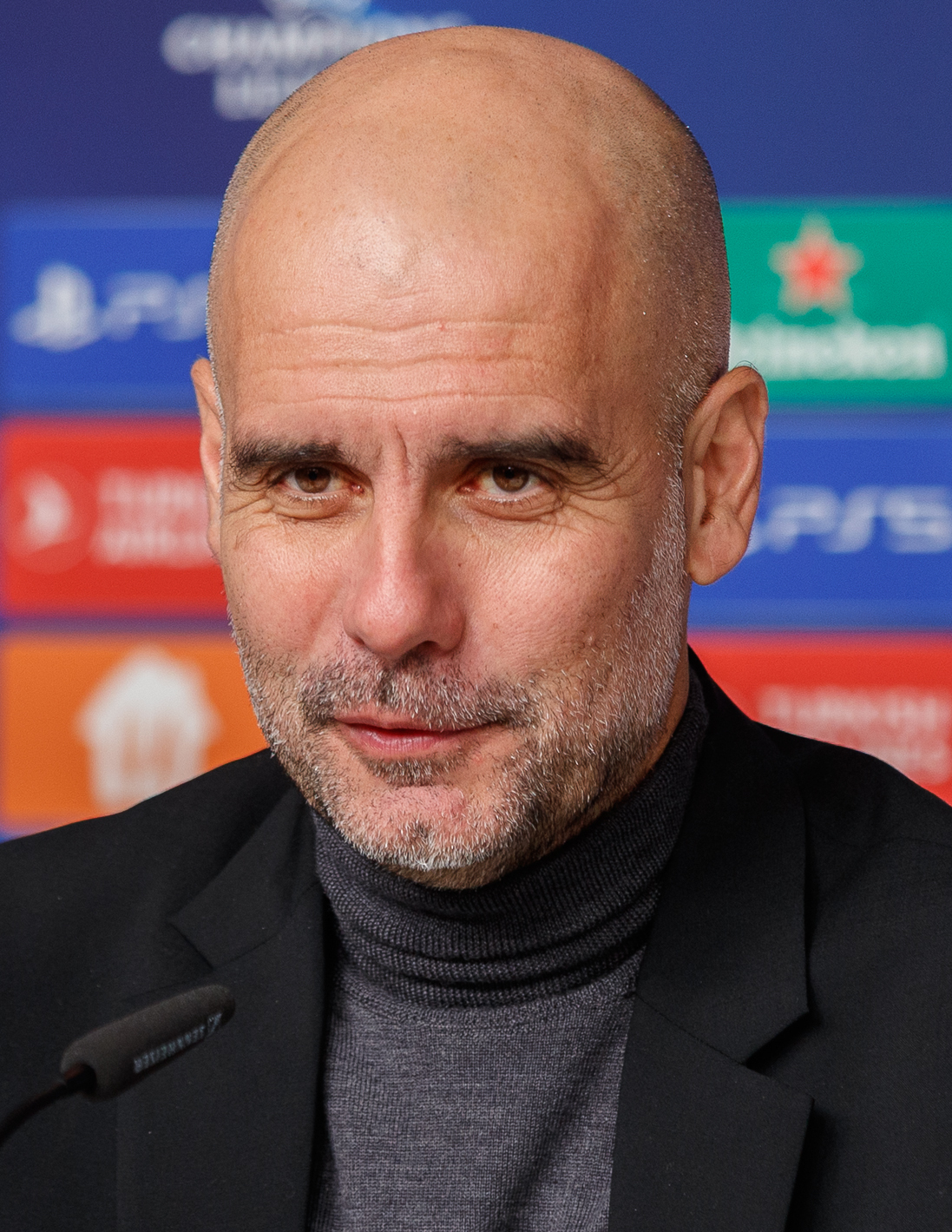
Pep Guardiola coached Barcelona to victory from the qualification round in 2008–09.

Four teams have won the tournament from the third qualification round:

- (England) Manchester United in 1998–99
- (Italy) Milan in 2002–03 and 2006–07
- (England) Liverpool in 2004–05
- (Spain) Barcelona in 2008–09

=== Most knockout tie wins ===
- Most knockout tie wins: **120** – (Spain) Real Madrid, 1955–2026; their first knockout tie success came following a 7–0 aggregate win over Servette in the 1955–56 first round, and their most recent victory was a 5–1 aggregate win over Manchester City in the 2025–26 round of the 16

=== Streaks ===
==== Consecutive goalscoring ====
- Most consecutive goalscoring in Champions League matches: **34**
  - (Spain) Real Madrid, 2011–2014
  - (France) Paris Saint-Germain, 2016–2020
- Most consecutive home goalscoring in Champions League matches: **45**
  - (Spain) Real Madrid, 2019–
- Most consecutive away goalscoring in Champions League matches: **13**
  - (Germany) Bayern Munich, 2019–2022; excluding three matches from 2019–20 played at neutral venues
- Most consecutive goalscoring in Champions League group/league phase: **51**
  - (France) Paris Saint-Germain, 2016–2024

==== Consecutive wins ====
- Most consecutive wins: **15** – (Germany) Bayern Munich, 2019–2020; Bayern Munich is also the first club to win all of their matches (without needing extra time) in a Champions League season, winning 11 out of 11 in their successful 2019–20 campaign.

==== Consecutive home wins ====
- Most consecutive home wins: **21** – (West Germany) Bayern Munich, 1969–1981
- Most consecutive home wins in the Champions League era: **16** – (Germany) Bayern Munich, 2014–2017

==== Consecutive away wins ====
- Most consecutive away wins: **7**
  - (Netherlands) Ajax, 1995–1997
  - (Germany) Bayern Munich, 2013–2014

==== Longest undefeated run ====
- Most consecutive unbeaten run: **26** – (England) Manchester City, 2022–2024

==== Longest home undefeated run ====
- Most consecutive home unbeaten run: **43** – (West Germany) Bayern Munich, 1969–1991
- Most consecutive home unbeaten run in Champions League era: **38** – (Spain) Barcelona, 2013–2020

==== Longest away undefeated run ====
- Most consecutive away unbeaten run: **22** – (Germany) Bayern Munich, 2017–2022; During this run, Bayern defeated Barcelona and Lyon in the 2019–20 quarter-finals and semi-finals respectively, played in Lisbon over a single leg as a result of the COVID-19 pandemic. They also defeated Paris Saint-Germain in the 2020 final. These matches, however, were played at a neutral venue, and as such are not classified as away games.

==== Most consecutive draws ====
- Most consecutive draws: **7** – (Greece) AEK Athens, 2002–2003

==== Most consecutive defeats ====
- Most consecutive defeats: **16** – (Luxembourg) Jeunesse Esch, 1973–1987
- Most consecutive defeats in Champions League era: **14** – (Slovakia) Slovan Bratislava, 1992–2026

==== Most consecutive games without a win ====
- Most consecutive games without a win (not counting qualifying rounds): **23** – (Romania) FCSB, 2006–2013

== Players ==
=== Wins ===
==== Most wins ====
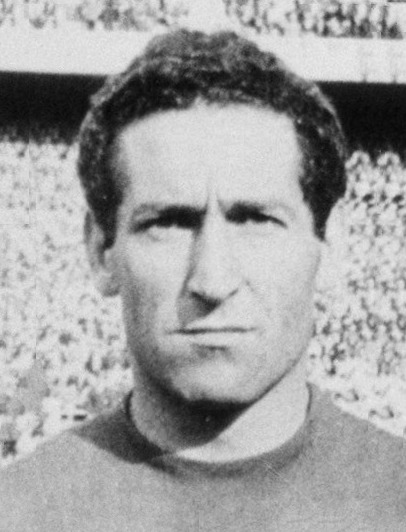
Paco Gento, first of the five players to have won the tournament on six occasions, appeared in eight finals.

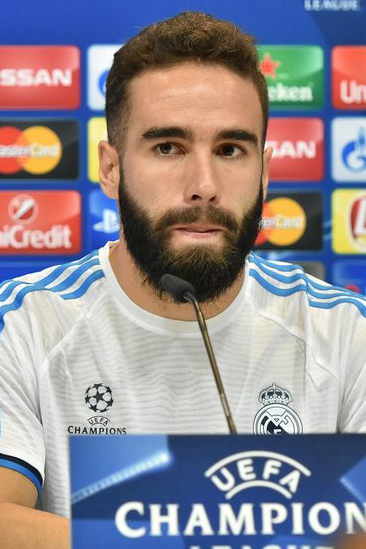
Dani Carvajal, the only player with six titles who started in all the finals he won, alongside Paco Gento

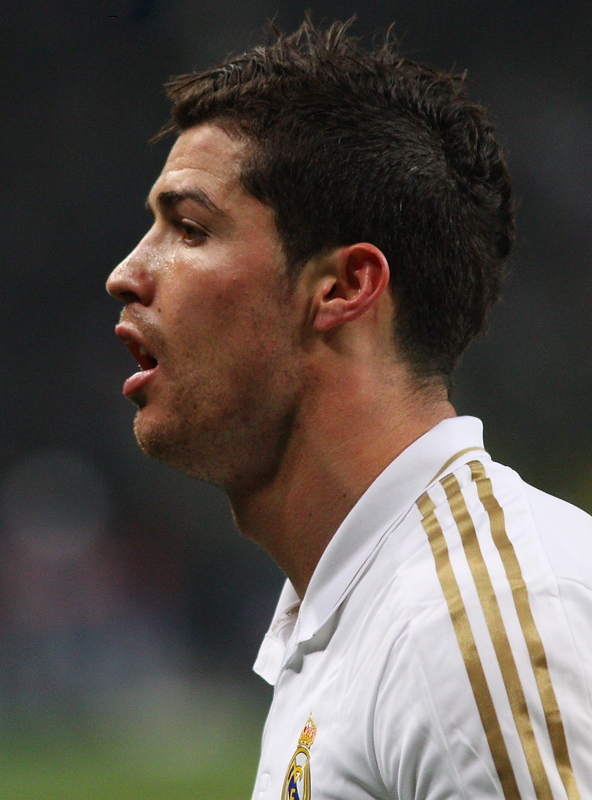
Cristiano Ronaldo holds the record for the most match wins in the tournament.

No. of wins	Player	Club(s)
6	(Spain) Paco Gento	Real Madrid (1956, 1957, 1958, 1959, 1960, 1966)
6	(Germany) Toni Kroos	Bayern Munich (2013); Real Madrid (2016, 2017, 2018, 2022, 2024)
6	(Spain) Dani Carvajal	Real Madrid (2014, 2016, 2017, 2018, 2022, 2024)
6	(Croatia) Luka Modrić	Real Madrid (2014, 2016, 2017, 2018, 2022, 2024)
6	(Spain) Nacho	Real Madrid (2014, 2016, 2017, 2018, 2022, 2024)
5	(Spain) Juan Alonso	Real Madrid (1956, 1957, 1958, 1959, 1960)
5	(Spain) Rafael Lesmes	Real Madrid (1956, 1957, 1958, 1959, 1960)
5	(Spain) Marquitos	Real Madrid (1956, 1957, 1958, 1959, 1960)
5	(Spain) Héctor Rial	Real Madrid (1956, 1957, 1958, 1959, 1960)
5	(Argentina) (Spain) Alfredo Di Stéfano	Real Madrid (1956, 1957, 1958, 1959, 1960)
5	(Spain) José María Zárraga	Real Madrid (1956, 1957, 1958, 1959, 1960)
5	(Italy) Alessandro Costacurta	Milan (1989, 1990, 1994, 2003, 2007)
5	(Italy) Paolo Maldini	Milan (1989, 1990, 1994, 2003, 2007)
5	(Portugal) Cristiano Ronaldo	Manchester United (2008); Real Madrid (2014, 2016, 2017, 2018)
5	(Wales) Gareth Bale	Real Madrid (2014, 2016, 2017, 2018, 2022)
5	(France) Karim Benzema	Real Madrid (2014, 2016, 2017, 2018, 2022)
5	(Brazil) Casemiro	Real Madrid (2014, 2016, 2017, 2018, 2022)
5	(Brazil) Marcelo	Real Madrid (2014, 2016, 2017, 2018, 2022)
5	(Spain) Lucas Vázquez	Real Madrid (2016, 2017, 2018, 2022, 2024)
4	(Spain) Joseíto	Real Madrid (1956, 1957, 1958, 1959)
4	(Spain) Enrique Mateos	Real Madrid (1957, 1958, 1959, 1960)
4	(Spain) Juan Santisteban	Real Madrid (1957, 1958, 1959, 1960)
4	(Uruguay) (Spain) José Santamaría	Real Madrid (1958, 1959, 1960, 1966)
4	(England) Phil Neal	Liverpool (1977, 1978, 1981, 1984)
4	(Netherlands) Clarence Seedorf	Ajax (1995); Real Madrid (1998); Milan (2003, 2007)
4	(Spain) Andrés Iniesta	Barcelona (2006, 2009, 2011, 2015)
4	(Argentina) Lionel Messi	Barcelona (2006, 2009, 2011, 2015)
4	(Spain) Xavi	Barcelona (2006, 2009, 2011, 2015)
4	(Spain) Gerard Piqué	Manchester United (2008); Barcelona (2009, 2011, 2015)
4	(Spain) Sergio Ramos	Real Madrid (2014, 2016, 2017, 2018)
4	(Spain) Isco	Real Madrid (2014, 2016, 2017, 2018)
4	(France) Raphaël Varane	Real Madrid (2014, 2016, 2017, 2018)
4	(Croatia) Mateo Kovačić	Real Madrid (2016, 2017, 2018); Chelsea (2021)
4	(Austria) David Alaba	Bayern Munich (2013, 2020); Real Madrid (2022, 2024)

==== Finals ====
- Most tournament wins while starting in the final: **6**
  - (Spain) Paco Gento
  - (Spain) Dani Carvajal
    - In addition, (Croatia) Luka Modrić appeared in five finals as a starter, and played his sixth final as a substitute.
- Most appearances in finals: **8**
  - (Spain) Paco Gento: 1956, 1957, 1958, 1959, 1960, 1962, 1964 and 1966, all with Real Madrid.
  - (Italy) Paolo Maldini: 1989, 1990, 1993, 1994, 1995, 2003, 2005 and 2007, all with Milan.

==== Match wins ====
- Most matches won: **115** – (Portugal) Cristiano Ronaldo, 2003–2022
- The only other players to win 100 or more matches:
  - (Germany) Thomas Müller, 2008–2025, **111**
  - (Germany) Manuel Neuer, 2007–2026, **109**
  - (Spain) Iker Casillas, 1999–2019, **101**
- Most consecutive matches won by a player: **22** – (Poland) Robert Lewandowski, 2019–2021 (Note: The run began on 18 September 2019 with a 3–0 success against Red Star Belgrade in his first group stage match of the 2019–20 season, after losing 3–1 against Liverpool in the previous season's round of 16. The streak continued as Lewandowski started in all of Bayern's other four group victories (he did not play in their win against Tottenham Hotspur) and all five knockout phase wins, as they defeated Paris Saint-Germain 1–0 in the final. In the following season, Lewandowski started in a further four victories for Bayern in the group stage (he did not play against Atlético Madrid or Lokomotiv Moscow) and reached a sixteenth win after appearing in a 2–1 second leg success against Lazio in the round of 16. Because of injury, he did not play against Paris Saint-Germain in either leg of the quarter-finals. In the following season, Lewandowski started in a further six victories for Bayern in the group stage. Lewandowski's streak ended on 16 February 2022, following a 1–1 draw against Red Bull Salzburg in the first leg of the round of 16.)
- Most matches won by a player against a single opponent: **8**
  - (Germany) Manuel Neuer, with Schalke 04 and Bayern Munich, against Benfica in nine games.
  - (Poland) Robert Lewandowski, with Bayern Munich and Barcelona, against Benfica in nine games.
  - (Germany) Thomas Müller, with Bayern Munich, against Barcelona in ten games.

==== Combinations of wins in the Champions League and other competitions ====
- Twelve players have won both the UEFA Champions League and the FIFA World Cup in the same year:
  - 1974: Sepp Maier, Paul Breitner, Hans-Georg Schwarzenbeck, Franz Beckenbauer, Gerd Müller, Uli Hoeneß and Jupp Kapellmann (Bayern Munich and West Germany)
  - 1998: Christian Karembeu (Real Madrid and France)
  - 2002: Roberto Carlos (Real Madrid and Brazil)
  - 2014: Sami Khedira (Real Madrid and Germany)
  - 2018: Raphaël Varane (Real Madrid and France)
  - 2026: Fabián Ruiz (Paris Saint-Germain and Spain)
- Seventeen players have won both the UEFA Champions League and the UEFA European Championship in the same year:
  - 1964: Luis Suárez (Inter Milan and Spain)
  - 1988: Hans van Breukelen, Ronald Koeman, Berry van Aerle, Gerald Vanenburg and Wim Kieft (PSV Eindhoven and Netherlands)
  - 2000: Christian Karembeu and Nicolas Anelka (Real Madrid and France)
  - 2012: Fernando Torres and Juan Mata (Chelsea and Spain)
  - 2016: Cristiano Ronaldo and Pepe (Real Madrid and Portugal)
  - 2021: Jorginho and Emerson (Chelsea and Italy)
  - 2024: Dani Carvajal, Joselu and Nacho (Real Madrid and Spain)
- Twenty-five players have won the UEFA Champions League and been runner-up of either the FIFA World Cup or UEFA European Championship in the same year:
  - 1976: Sepp Maier, Hans-Georg Schwarzenbeck, Franz Beckenbauer and Uli Hoeneß (Bayern Munich and West Germany)
  - 1994: Paolo Maldini, Franco Baresi, Roberto Donadoni, Demetrio Albertini and Daniele Massaro (AC Milan and Italy)
  - 1998: Roberto Carlos (Real Madrid and Brazil)
  - 2004: Paulo Ferreira, Ricardo Carvalho, Nuno Valente, Maniche, Costinha and Deco (Porto and Portugal)
  - 2010: Wesley Sneijder (Inter Milan and Netherlands)
  - 2014: Ángel Di María (Real Madrid and Argentina)
  - 2018: Luka Modrić and Mateo Kovačić (Real Madrid and Croatia)
  - 2021: Mason Mount, Reece James and Ben Chilwell (Chelsea and England)
  - 2022: Eduardo Camavinga (Real Madrid and France)
  - 2024: Jude Bellingham (Real Madrid and England)
- Nineteen players have been runner-up of the UEFA Champions League and either the FIFA World Cup or UEFA European Championship in the same year:
  - 1958: Nils Liedholm (Milan and Sweden)
  - 1982: Karl-Heinz Rummenigge and Paul Breitner (Bayern Munich and West Germany)
  - 2002: Michael Ballack, Carsten Ramelow, Bernd Schneider, Oliver Neuville and Hans-Jörg Butt (Bayer Leverkusen and Germany)
  - 2006: Thierry Henry (Arsenal and France)
  - 2008: Michael Ballack (2) (Chelsea and Germany)
  - 2010: Arjen Robben and Mark van Bommel (Bayern Munich and Netherlands)
  - 2016: Antoine Griezmann (Atlético Madrid and France)
  - 2018: Dejan Lovren (Liverpool and Croatia)
  - 2021: Phil Foden, Raheem Sterling, John Stones and Kyle Walker (Manchester City and England)
  - 2022: Ibrahima Konaté (Liverpool and France)
- Five players have won both the UEFA Champions League and the FIFA Confederations Cup in the same year:
  - 2001: Willy Sagnol and Bixente Lizarazu (Bayern Munich and France)
  - 2009: Dani Alves (Barcelona and Brazil)
  - 2013: Dante and Luiz Gustavo (Bayern Munich and Brazil)
- Three players have won both the UEFA Champions League and the gold medal at the Olympic Games in the same year:
  - 1992: Albert Ferrer and Pep Guardiola (Barcelona and Spain)
  - 2000: Geremi (Real Madrid and Cameroon)
- Six players have won both the UEFA Champions League and the UEFA Nations League in the same year:
  - 2023: Aymeric Laporte and Rodri (Manchester City and Spain)
  - 2025: Gonçalo Ramos, João Neves, Vitinha and Nuno Mendes (Paris Saint-Germain and Portugal)
- Three players have won both the UEFA Champions League and the Copa América in the same year:
  - 2015: Claudio Bravo (Barcelona and Chile)
  - 2019: Alisson Becker and Roberto Firmino (Liverpool and Brazil)
- Two players have won both the UEFA Champions League and the Africa Cup of Nations in the same year:
  - 2000: Geremi (Real Madrid and Cameroon)
  - 2002: Geremi (2) (Real Madrid and Cameroon)
  - 2026: Achraf Hakimi (Paris Saint-Germain and Morocco)
- Two players have won both the UEFA Champions League and the CONCACAF Gold Cup in the same year:
  - 2009: Rafael Márquez (Barcelona and Mexico)
  - 2021: Christian Pulisic (Chelsea and United States)
- Eighteen players have won both the UEFA Champions League and the Copa Libertadores:
  - (Argentina) Juan Pablo Sorín with Juventus (1995–96 (Note: Did not play the final)) and River Plate (1996)
  - (Argentina) Santiago Solari with River Plate (1996) and Real Madrid (2001–02)
  - (Brazil) Dida with Cruzeiro (1997) and Milan (2002–03 and 2006–07)
  - (Brazil) Cafu with São Paulo (1992 and 1993) and Milan (2006–07)
  - (Brazil) Roque Júnior with Palmeiras (1999) and Milan (2002–03)
  - (Argentina) Carlos Tevez with Boca Juniors (2003) and Manchester United (2007–08)
  - (Argentina) Walter Samuel with Boca Juniors (2000) and Inter Milan (2009–10)
  - (Brazil) Ronaldinho with Barcelona (2005–06) and Atlético Mineiro (2013)
  - (Brazil) Neymar with Santos (2011) and Barcelona (2014–15)
  - (Brazil) Danilo with Santos (2011), Flamengo (2025) and Real Madrid (2015–16 and 2016–17)
  - (Brazil) Rafinha with Bayern Munich (2012–13) and Flamengo (2019)
  - (Brazil) Ramires with Chelsea (2011–12) and Palmeiras (2020)
  - (Argentina) Willy Caballero with Boca Juniors (2003) and Chelsea (2020–21)
  - (Brazil) David Luiz with Chelsea (2011–12) and Flamengo (2022)
  - (Argentina) Julián Alvarez with River Plate (2018) and Manchester City (2022–23)
  - (Brazil) Marcelo with Real Madrid (2013–14, 2015–16, 2016–17, 2017–18 and 2021–22) and Fluminense (2023)
  - (Brazil) Marquinhos with Corinthians (2012) and Paris Saint-Germain (2024–25 and 2025–26)
  - (Italy) Jorginho with Chelsea (2020–21) and Flamengo (2025) — Jorginho is the first non-Latin player to achieve this feat.
- Three players have won both the UEFA Champions League and the AFC Champions League Elite:
  - (Brazil) Roberto Firmino with Liverpool (2018–19) and Al-Ahli (2024–25)
  - (Senegal) Édouard Mendy with Chelsea (2020–21) and Al-Ahli (2024–25 and 2025–26)
  - (Algeria) Riyad Mahrez with Manchester City (2022–23) and Al-Ahli (2024–25 and 2025–26)

==== Combinations of wins in the Champions League, national team competitions and Ballon d'Or ====
Note: The time period indicates when the first and last success occurred; multiple wins of the same competition or award are possible.
Clubs in parentheses denote teams with which the player won a Ballon d'Or but not the UEFA Champions League.

- Four players have won the UEFA Champions League, the FIFA World Cup, the UEFA European Championship and the Ballon d'Or:
  - Gerd Müller with Bayern Munich and West Germany, 1970–1974
  - Franz Beckenbauer with Bayern Munich and West Germany, 1972–1974
  - Zinedine Zidane with (Juventus), Real Madrid and France, 1998–2002
  - Rodri with Manchester City and Spain, 2023–2026
- Three players have won the UEFA Champions League, the FIFA World Cup, the Copa América and the Ballon d'Or:
  - Rivaldo with (Barcelona), AC Milan and Brazil, 1999–2003
  - Ronaldinho with Barcelona and Brazil, 1999–2006
  - Lionel Messi with Barcelona, (Paris Saint-Germain), (Inter Miami) and Argentina, 2006–2024
- In addition to the seven players, four have won the UEFA Champions League, FIFA World Cup and Ballon d'Or, missing only on an international continental title:
  - Bobby Charlton with Manchester United and England, 1966–1968
  - Paolo Rossi with Juventus and Italy, 1982–1985
  - Kaká with Milan and Brazil, 2002–2007
  - Ousmane Dembélé with Paris Saint-Germain and France, 2018–2026

==== Oldest and youngest ====
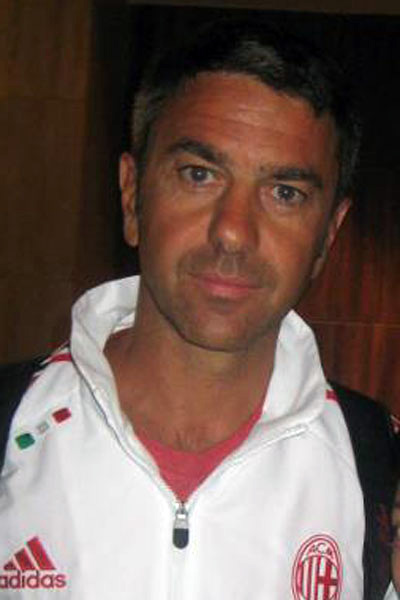
Alessandro Costacurta, the oldest winner of the competition as a player

- Oldest player to win the tournament: **41 years and 29 days** – (Italy) Alessandro Costacurta, 2007 with Milan; made three appearances in the competition, but didn’t play the final.
- Youngest player to win the tournament: **17 years and 201 days** – (England) Gary Mills, 1979 with Nottingham Forest; on the virtue of having made one appearance in the competition that season, despite him not playing in the final match.
- Youngest player to play in and win a final: **18 years and 139 days** – (Portugal) António Simões, 1962 final with Benfica
- Youngest player to lose a final: **16 years and 150 days** – (England) Max Dowman, 2026 final with Arsenal
- Youngest player to play in and lose a final: **18 years and 307 days** – (Netherlands) Kiki Musampa, 1996 final with Ajax
- Oldest player to play in and win a final: **38 years and 331 days** – (Italy) Paolo Maldini, 2007 final with Milan
- Oldest player to play in and lose a final: **41 years and 86 days** – (Italy) Dino Zoff, 1983 final with Juventus

==== Relatives ====
- Four father-son duos have won the competition, all for the same club:
  - (Italy) Cesare Maldini (1962–63) and Paolo Maldini (1988–89, 1989–90, 1993–94, 2002–03 and 2006–07), both for Milan
  - (Spain) Manuel Sanchís (1965–66) and Manolo Sanchís (1997–98 and 1999–2000), both for Real Madrid
  - (Spain) Carles Busquets (1991–92) and Sergio Busquets (2008–09, 2010–11, and 2014–15) both for Barcelona
  - (France) Zinedine Zidane (2001–02) and his two sons, Enzo Zidane (2016–17) and Luca Zidane (2017–18), all three for Real Madrid, with Zinedine managing the club during both his sons' wins
- Seven brother duos have won the competition:
  - (Denmark) Michael Laudrup (1991–92 with Barcelona) and Brian Laudrup (1993–94 with Milan).
  - (Netherlands) Frank de Boer and Ronald de Boer (both in 1994–95 with Ajax).
  - (England) Gary Neville and Phil Neville (both in 1998–99 with Manchester United).
  - (Argentina) Diego Milito (2009–10 with Inter Milan) and Gabriel Milito (2010–11 with Barcelona).
  - (Spain) (Brazil) Thiago Alcântara (2010–11 with Barcelona and 2019–20 with Bayern Munich) and Rafinha Alcântara (2014–15 with Barcelona).
  - (France) Enzo Zidane (2016–17) and Luca Zidane (2017–18), both for Real Madrid.
  - (France) Théo Hernandez (2017–18 with Real Madrid) and Lucas Hernandez (2019–20 with Bayern Munich and 2024–25 and 2025–26 with Paris Saint-Germain).
- Only one grandfather-father-son trio have reached the final with their clubs:
  - (Spain) Marcos Alonso Imaz (1955–56, 1956–57, 1957–58, 1958–59, 1959–60 and 1961–62, all with Real Madrid), Marcos Alonso Peña (1985–86 with Barcelona) and Marcos Alonso Mendoza (2020–21 with Chelsea).

==== Other records ====
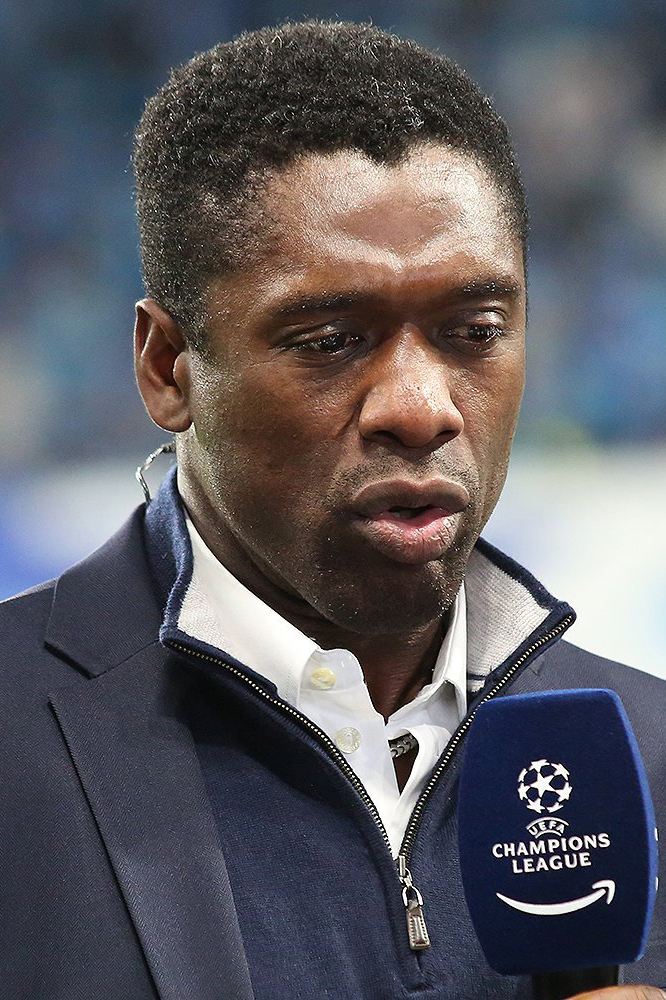
Clarence Seedorf is the only player to win the tournament with three clubs.

- Most wins with different clubs: **3** – (Netherlands) Clarence Seedorf; with Ajax in 1994–95, with Real Madrid in 1997–98 and with Milan in 2002–03 and 2006–07
- First player to win the trophy with two clubs: (Italy) Saul Malatrasi; with Inter Milan in 1964–65 and with Milan in 1968–69
- First player to win the trophy with two clubs and played both finals: (Romania) Miodrag Belodedici; with Steaua București in 1985–86 and with Red Star Belgrade in 1990–91
- Four players have won the Champions League in two consecutive seasons with two clubs:
  - (France) Marcel Desailly in 1992–93 with Marseille and in 1993–94 with Milan
  - (Portugal) Paulo Sousa in 1995–96 with Juventus and in 1996–97 with Borussia Dortmund
  - (Spain) Gerard Piqué in 2007–08 with Manchester United and in 2008–09 with Barcelona
  - (Cameroon) Samuel Eto'o in 2008–09 with Barcelona and in 2009–10 with Inter Milan; the only player to have won a treble in two consecutive seasons with two clubs

=== Appearances ===
==== All-time top player appearances ====
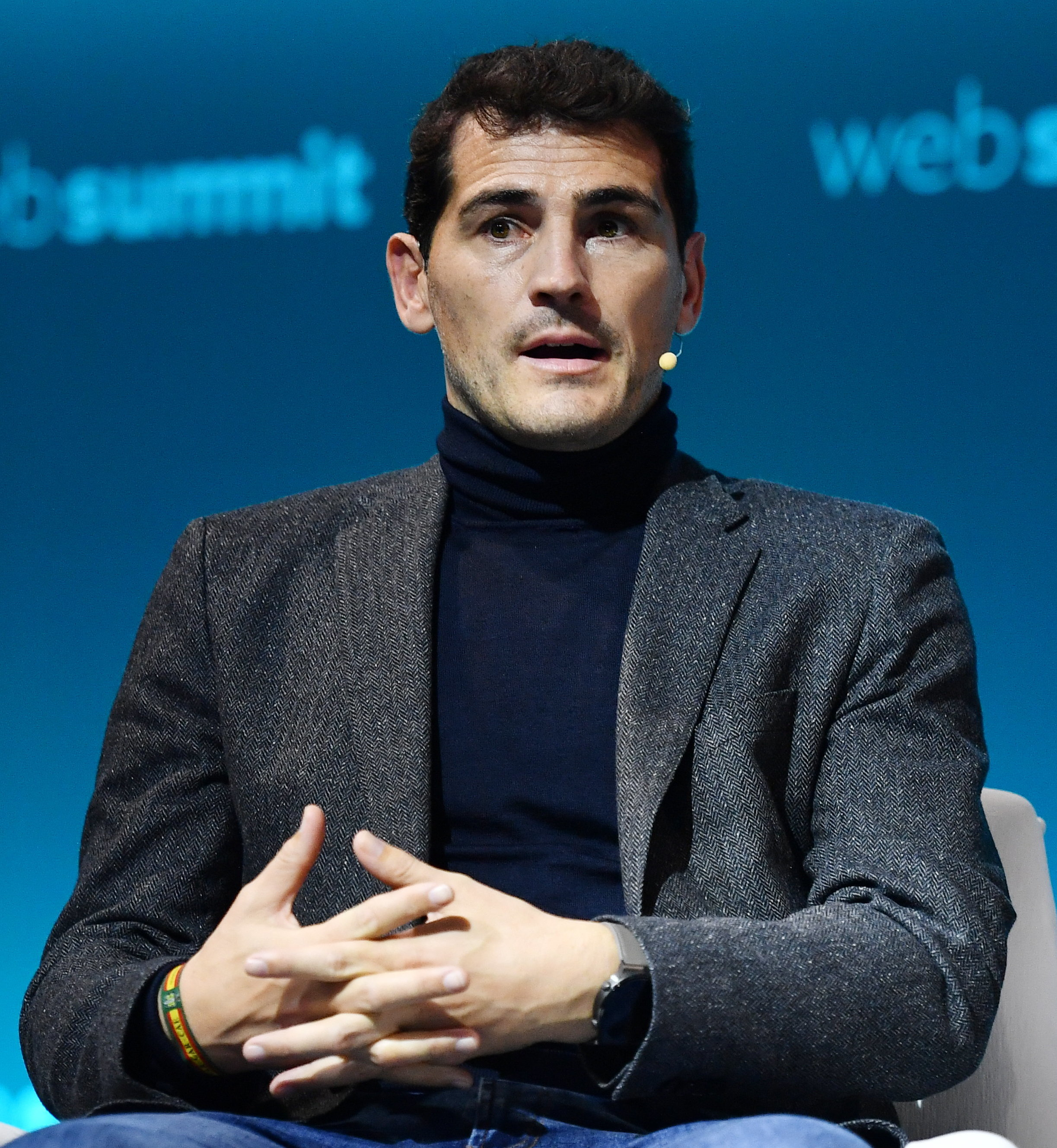
Iker Casillas has made the most appearances in the competition for a goalkeeper.

As of 4 November 2026

Players taking part in the 2026–27 UEFA Champions League are highlighted in bold.
The table below does not include appearances made in the qualification stage of the competition.

Rank	Player	Nation	Apps	Years	Club(s) (Apps)
1	Cristiano Ronaldo	Portugal	183	2003–2022	Manchester United (59), Real Madrid (101), Juventus (23)
2	Iker Casillas	Spain	177	1999–2019	Real Madrid (150), Porto (27)
3	**Manuel Neuer**	Germany	164	2007–	Schalke 04 (22), **Bayern Munich** (142)
4	Lionel Messi	Argentina	163	2004–2023	Barcelona (149), Paris Saint-Germain (14)
4	Thomas Müller	Germany	163	2009–2025	Bayern Munich
6	Karim Benzema	France	152	2005–2023	Lyon (19), Real Madrid (133)
7	Xavi	Spain	151	1998–2015	Barcelona
7	Toni Kroos	Germany	151	2008–2024	Bayern Munich (41), Real Madrid (110)
9	Robert Lewandowski	Poland	144	2011–2026	Borussia Dortmund (28), Bayern Munich (78), Barcelona (38)
10	Raúl	Spain	142	1995–2011	Real Madrid (130), Schalke 04 (12)
10	Sergio Ramos	Spain	142	2005–2023	Real Madrid (129), Paris Saint-Germain (8), Sevilla (5)
10	Luka Modrić	Croatia	142	2010–2025	Tottenham Hotspur (8), Real Madrid (134)

==== Oldest and youngest ====
- Oldest player: **43 years and 252 days** – (Italy) Marco Ballotta, for Lazio v Real Madrid, 11 December 2007
- Oldest outfield player: **41 years and 14 days** – (Portugal) Pepe, for Porto v Arsenal, 12 March 2024.
- Oldest player to make his debut: **41 years 66 days** – (Australia) Mark Schwarzer, for Chelsea v FCSB, 11 December 2013
- Oldest debutant outfield player to start a match: **37 years and 342 days** – (Uruguay) Cristhian Stuani, for Girona v Paris Saint-Germain, 18 September 2024
- Youngest player: **15 years and 308 days** – (England) Max Dowman, for Arsenal v Slavia Prague, 4 November 2025
- Youngest player to start a match: **16 years and 83 days** – (Spain) Lamine Yamal, for Barcelona v Porto, 4 October 2023
- Youngest player in the knockout phase in the Champions League era: **16 years and 223 days** – (Spain) Lamine Yamal, for Barcelona v Napoli, 21 February 2024
- Oldest player in the knockout phase in the Champions League era: **41 years and 206 days** – (Australia) Mark Schwarzer, for Chelsea v Atlético Madrid, 30 April 2014

==== Other records ====
- First player to make 100 Champions League appearances: (Spain) Raúl, for Real Madrid v Arsenal, 21 February 2006
- Most consecutive seasons with appearances: **20** – (Spain) Iker Casillas, 1999–2019, for Real Madrid and Porto
- Most seasons with knockout phase appearance: **19** – (Spain) Iker Casillas, 1999–2019, for Real Madrid and Porto
- Most minutes played: **16,267 minutes** – (Spain) Iker Casillas, 1999–2019
- Most group stage/league phase appearances: **98** – (Portugal) Cristiano Ronaldo, 2003–2022
- Most appearances for a single club: **163** – (Germany) Thomas Müller, 2008–2025, with Bayern Munich
- Most consecutive matches without defeat: **26** – (Portugal) Bernardo Silva, 2018–2021, with Manchester City
- Most different clubs played for: **7** – (Sweden) Zlatan Ibrahimović, with Ajax, Juventus, Inter Milan, Barcelona, Milan, Paris Saint-Germain and Manchester United.
- Most different clubs played for in a single country: **5** – (Spain) Isco, with Valencia, Málaga, Real Madrid, Sevilla and Real Betis.

=== Goalscoring ===
==== All-time top scorers ====
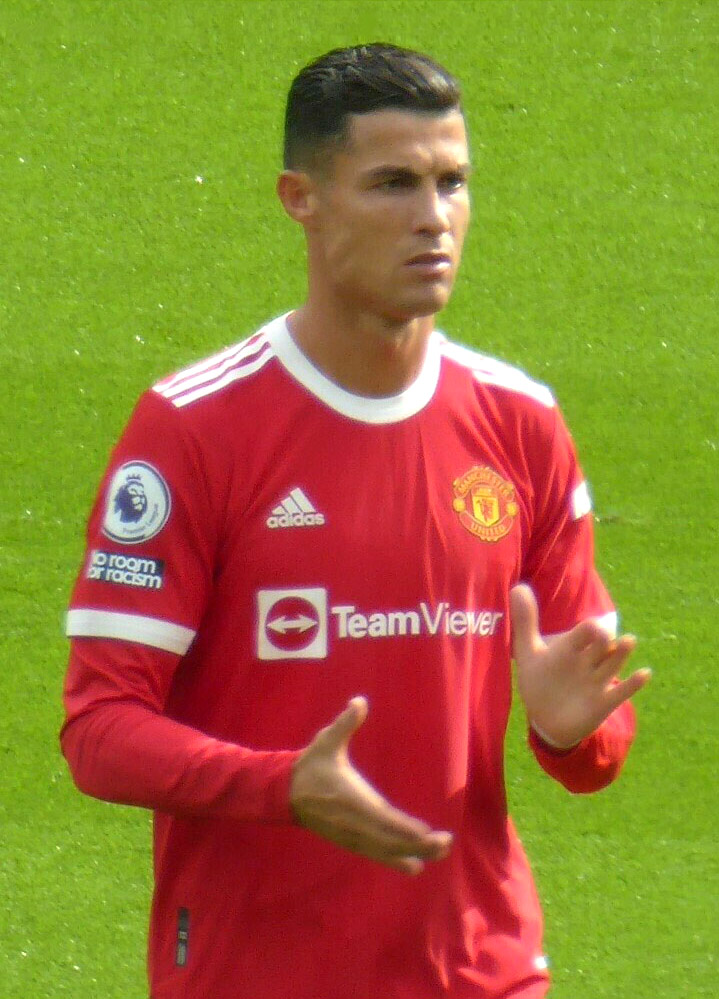
Cristiano Ronaldo is the all-time top goalscorer in the competition.

As of 4 November 2026

A ‡ indicates the player was from the European Cup era.
Players taking part in the 2026–27 UEFA Champions League are highlighted in bold.
The table below does not include goals scored in the qualification stage of the competition.

Rank	Player	Goals	Apps	Ratio	Years	Club(s) (Goals/Apps)
1	(Portugal) Cristiano Ronaldo	140	183	0.77	2003–2022	Manchester United (21/59), Real Madrid (105/101), Juventus (14/23)
2	(Argentina) Lionel Messi	129	163	0.79	2005–2023	Barcelona (120/149), Paris Saint-Germain (9/14)
3	(Poland) Robert Lewandowski	109	144	0.76	2011–2026	Borussia Dortmund (17/28), Bayern Munich (69/78), Barcelona (23/38)
4	(France) Karim Benzema	90	152	0.59	2005–2023	Lyon (12/19), Real Madrid (78/133)
5	(France) **Kylian Mbappé**	74	102	0.73	2016–	Monaco (6/9), Paris Saint-Germain (42/64), **Real Madrid** (26/29)
6	(Spain) Raúl	71	142	0.50	1995–2011	Real Madrid (66/130), Schalke 04 (5/12)
7	(Norway) **Erling Haaland**	62	61	1.02	2019–	Red Bull Salzburg (8/6), Borussia Dortmund (15/13), **Manchester City** (39/42)
8	(England) **Harry Kane**	58	74	0.78	2016–	Tottenham Hotspur (21/32), **Bayern Munich** (37/42)
9	(Germany) Thomas Müller	57	163	0.35	2009–2025	Bayern Munich
10	(Netherlands) Ruud van Nistelrooy	56	73	0.77	1998–2009	PSV Eindhoven (8/11), Manchester United (35/43), Real Madrid (13/19)

==== Top scorers by seasons ====
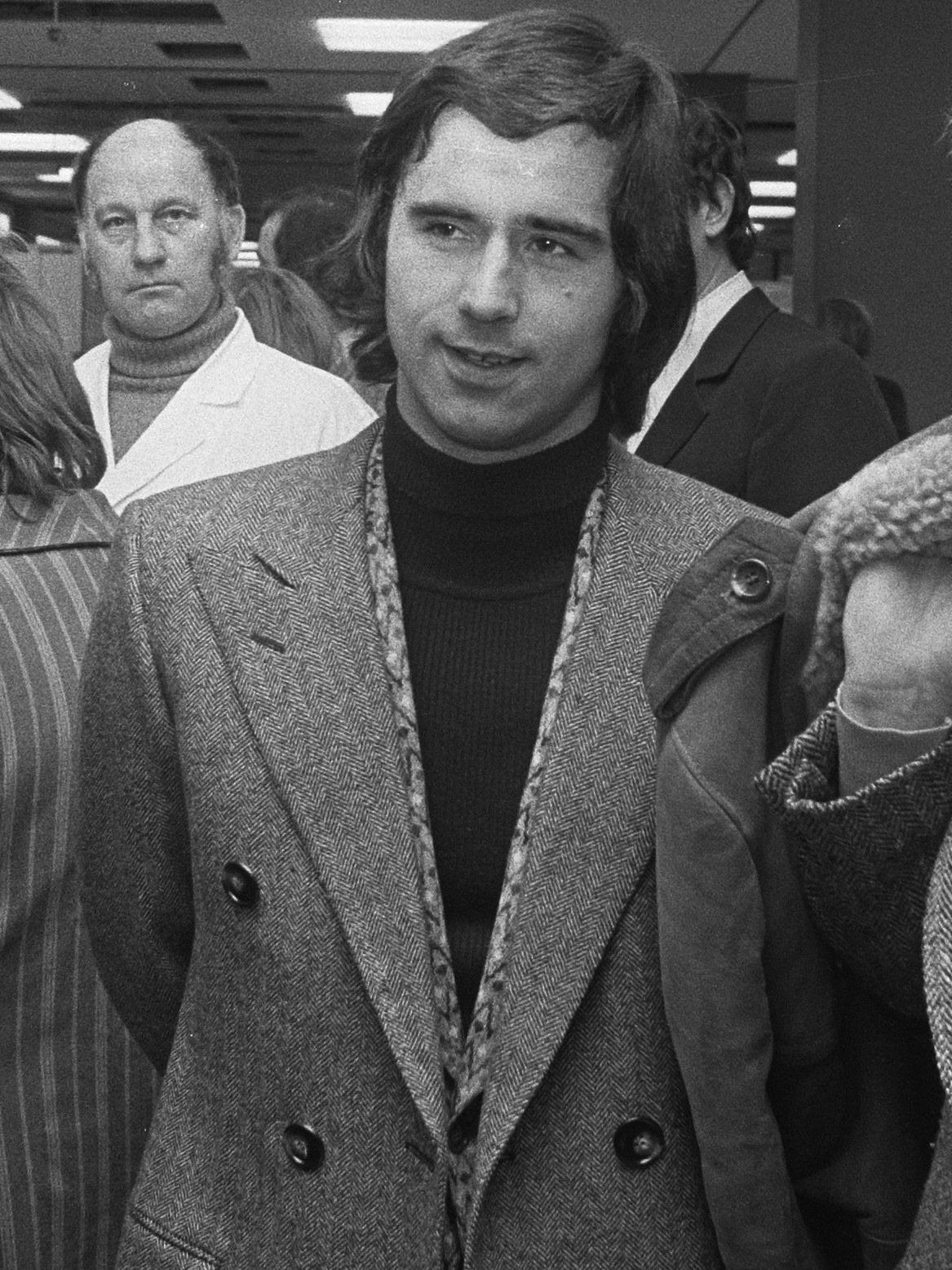
Gerd Müller was the first player to become top scorer in four Champions League seasons.

- Most seasons as top scorer: **7** – (Portugal) Cristiano Ronaldo, 2007–08, 2012–13, 2013–14, 2014–15, 2015–16, 2016–17 and 2017–18
- Youngest top scorer: **20 years, 231 days** – (Norway) Erling Haaland, 2020–21
- Oldest top scorer: **37 years, 36 days** – (Hungary) Ferenc Puskás, 1963–64
- Most top scorers by team: **17** – (Spain) Real Madrid:
  - (Argentina) (Colombia) (Spain) Alfredo Di Stéfano in 1957–58 and 1961–62
  - (Hungary) Ferenc Puskás in 1959–60, 1961–62 and 1963–64
  - (Spain) Justo Tejada in 1961–62
  - (Spain) Míchel in 1987–88
  - (Spain) Raúl in 1999–2000 and 2000–01
  - (Portugal) Cristiano Ronaldo in 2012–13, 2013–14, 2014–15, 2015–16, 2016–17 and 2017–18
  - (France) Karim Benzema in 2021–22
  - (France) Kylian Mbappé in 2025–26
- Most top scorers by nation: **12** – Portugal:
  - (Portugal) José Águas in 1960–61
  - (Portugal) José Torres in 1964–65
  - (Portugal) Eusébio in 1965–66 and 1967–68
  - (Portugal) Rui Águas in 1987–88
  - (Portugal) Cristiano Ronaldo in 2007–08, 2012–13, 2013–14, 2014–15, 2015–16, 2016–17 and 2017–18
- (Portugal) José (1960–61) and Rui Águas (1987–88) are the only father–son duo to finish as top scorers; each achieved this while playing for Benfica.
- (West Germany) Jupp Heynckes is the only player to have been top scorer in this competition as well as in the Cup Winners' Cup and the UEFA Cup/Europa League:
  - 1975–76 top scorer with Borussia Mönchengladbach, and 1972–73 UEFA Cup, 1973–74 Cup Winners' Cup, and 1974–75 UEFA Cup top scorer also with Borussia Mönchengladbach
- The following top scorers have also been top scorers in the UEFA Cup/Europa League:
  - (Denmark) Allan Simonsen (1977–78 with Borussia Mönchengladbach) in the 1978–79 season with Borussia Mönchengladbach
  - (West Germany) Dieter Hoeneß (1981–82 with Bayern Munich) in the 1979–80 season with Bayern Munich
  - (Sweden) Torbjörn Nilsson (1984–85 and 1985–86 with Göteborg) in the 1981–82 season with Göteborg
- Only two players have been top scorer in this competition as well as in both the World Cup and the European Championship:
  - Gerd Müller in 1972–73, 1973–74, 1974–75 and 1976–77 with Bayern Munich, 1970 FIFA World Cup and UEFA Euro 1972 with West Germany
  - Harry Kane in 2023–24 with Bayern Munich, 2018 FIFA World Cup and UEFA Euro 2024 with England
- The following top scorers have also won the FIFA World Cup Golden Boot:
  - (France) Just Fontaine (1958–59) at the 1958 FIFA World Cup
  - (Hungary) Flórián Albert (1965–66) at the 1962 FIFA World Cup
  - (Portugal) Eusébio (1965–66, and 1967–68) at the 1966 FIFA World Cup
  - (Italy) Paolo Rossi (1982–83) at the 1982 FIFA World Cup
  - (France) Kylian Mbappé (2023–24 and 2025–26) at the 2022 FIFA World Cup and the 2026 FIFA World Cup
- The following top scorers have also been top scorers in the UEFA European Championship:
  - (France) Michel Platini (1984–85) at the UEFA Euro 1984
  - (Netherlands) Marco van Basten (1988–89) at the UEFA Euro 1988
  - (Portugal) Cristiano Ronaldo (2007–08, 2012–13, 2013–14, 2014–15, 2015–16, 2016–17 and 2017–18) at the UEFA Euro 2012 and the UEFA Euro 2020
- Only two players have also finished as top scorer at the FIFA World Cup and their domestic league in the same year:
  - 1966: Eusébio (1965–66) in the 1965–66 Primeira Divisão with Benfica and at the 1966 FIFA World Cup with Portugal
  - 2026: Kylian Mbappé (2025–26) in the 2025–26 La Liga with Real Madrid and at the 2026 FIFA World Cup with France

==== Most goals in a single season ====
As of 6 May 2026

Rank	Player	Season	Goals
1	(Portugal) Cristiano Ronaldo	2013–14	17
2	(Portugal) Cristiano Ronaldo	2015–16	16
3	(Portugal) Cristiano Ronaldo	2017–18	15
3	(Poland) Robert Lewandowski	2019–20	15
3	(France) Karim Benzema	2021–22	15
3	(France) Kylian Mbappé	2025–26	15
7	(Brazil) (Italy) José Altafini	1962–63	14
7	(Argentina) Lionel Messi	2011–12	14
7	(England) Harry Kane	2025–26	14
10	(Poland) Robert Lewandowski	2021–22	13
10	(Guinea) Serhou Guirassy	2024–25	13
10	(Brazil) Raphinha	2024–25	13
13	(Hungary) Ferenc Puskás	1959–60	12
13	(West Germany) Gerd Müller	1972–73	12
13	(Netherlands) Ruud van Nistelrooy	2002–03	12
13	(Argentina) Lionel Messi	2010–11	12
13	(Germany) Mario Gómez	2011–12	12
13	(Portugal) Cristiano Ronaldo	2012–13	12
13	(Portugal) Cristiano Ronaldo	2016–17	12
13	(Argentina) Lionel Messi	2018–19	12
13	(Norway) Erling Haaland	2022–23	12

==== Hat-tricks ====
- Most hat-tricks: **8**
  - (Argentina) Lionel Messi, 2005–2023
  - (Portugal) Cristiano Ronaldo, 2003–2022
- First hat-trick: (Hungary) Péter Palotás, for MTK Hungária v Anderlecht, 7 September 1955; in the second match ever played in the competition.
- First hat-trick of the Champions League era: (Netherlands) Juul Ellerman, for PSV Eindhoven v Žalgiris, 16 September 1992
- Only three players managed to score a hat-trick in a final:
  - (Argentina) (Colombia) (Spain) Alfredo Di Stéfano, for Real Madrid v Eintracht Frankfurt, 1960
  - (Hungary) Ferenc Puskás, Real Madrid v Eintracht Frankfurt, 1960 (four goals) and for Real Madrid v Benfica in 1962; Puskás in 1962 is the only player to score a hat-trick in a final and lose
  - (Italy) Pierino Prati, for Milan v Ajax, 1969
- Most hat-tricks in a single Champions League season: **3** – (Portugal) Cristiano Ronaldo, 3+4+3 goals, in 2015–16
- Six players have scored two hat-tricks in a single Champions League season:
  - (Argentina) Lionel Messi (3+5 goals and 3+3 goals) in 2011–12 and 2016–17
  - (Germany) Mario Gómez (3+4 goals) in 2011–12
  - (Brazil) Luiz Adriano, who scored hat-tricks in two consecutive games of the group stage (5+3 goals) in 2014–15
  - (Portugal) Cristiano Ronaldo, who scored hat-tricks in two consecutive games of the knockout phase (3+3 goals) in 2016–17
  - (Poland) Robert Lewandowski (3+3 goals) in 2021–22
  - (France) Karim Benzema (3+3 goals) in 2021–22, who, like Ronaldo, scored hat-tricks in two consecutive knockout phase matches
- Most hat-tricks with different teams: **3** – (Poland) Robert Lewandowski, with Borussia Dortmund, Bayern Munich and Barcelona
- Fastest-ever hat-trick: **6 minutes, 12 seconds** – (Egypt) Mohamed Salah, for Liverpool v Rangers, 12 October 2022; in addition, this was the fastest-ever Champions League hat-trick scored by a substitute.
- Fastest-ever Champions League hat-trick from the start of a match: **22 minutes and 18 seconds** – (Poland) Robert Lewandowski, for Bayern Munich v Red Bull Salzburg, 8 March 2022.
- Youngest player to score a hat trick: **18 years and 113 days** – (Spain) Raúl, for Real Madrid v Ferencváros, 18 October 1995
- Youngest debut player to score a hat trick: **18 years and 340 days** – (England) Wayne Rooney, for Manchester United v Fenerbahçe, 28 September 2004
- Oldest player to score a hat trick: **38 years and 173 days** – (Hungary) Ferenc Puskás, for Real Madrid v Feyenoord, 22 September 1965
- Oldest player to score a hat trick in the Champions League era: **34 years and 108 days** – (France) Karim Benzema, for Real Madrid v Chelsea, 6 April 2022
- Ten players have scored a hat-trick on their debut in the Champions League era:
  - (Netherlands) Marco van Basten for Milan v IFK Göteborg, 25 November 1992; together with Sébastien Haller for Ajax v Sporting CP, 15 September 2021, the only player who scored four goals in their debut
  - (Colombia) Faustino Asprilla for Newcastle United v Barcelona, 17 September 1997
  - (Nigeria) Yakubu for Maccabi Haifa v Olympiacos, 24 September 2002
  - (England) Wayne Rooney for Manchester United v Fenerbahçe, 28 September 2004
  - (Italy) Vincenzo Iaquinta for Udinese v Panathinaikos, 14 September 2005
  - (Brazil) Grafite for VfL Wolfsburg v CSKA Moscow, 15 September 2009
  - (Algeria) Yacine Brahimi for Porto v BATE Borisov, 17 September 2014
  - (Norway) Erling Haaland for Red Bull Salzburg v Genk, 17 September 2019; the only player to score a first-half hat-trick on his debut
  - (Croatia) Mislav Oršić for Dinamo Zagreb v Atalanta, 18 September 2019
  - (Ivory Coast) Sébastien Haller for Ajax v Sporting CP, 15 September 2021

==== Four goals in a match ====
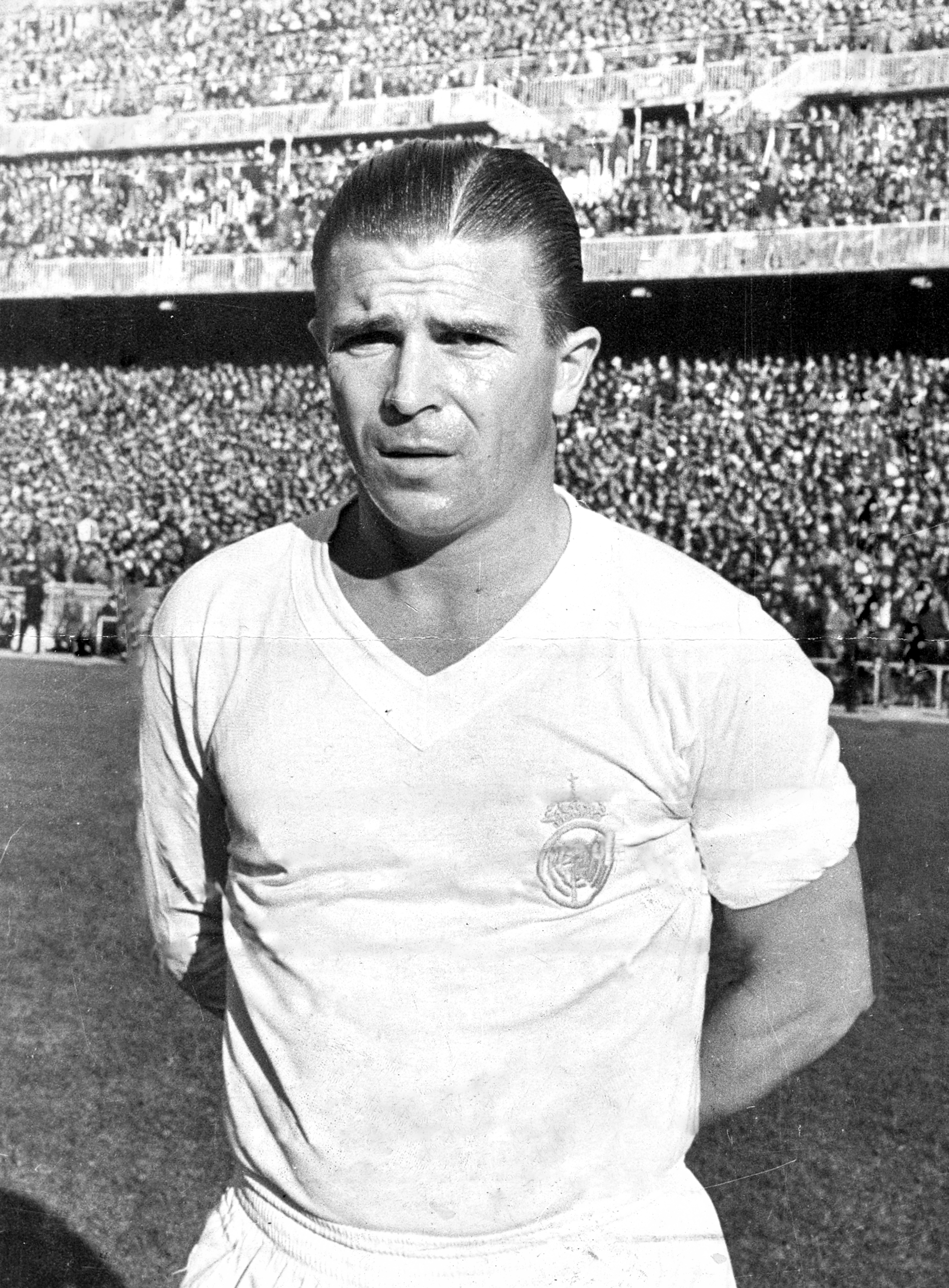
Ferenc Puskás is the only footballer to score four goals in a final.

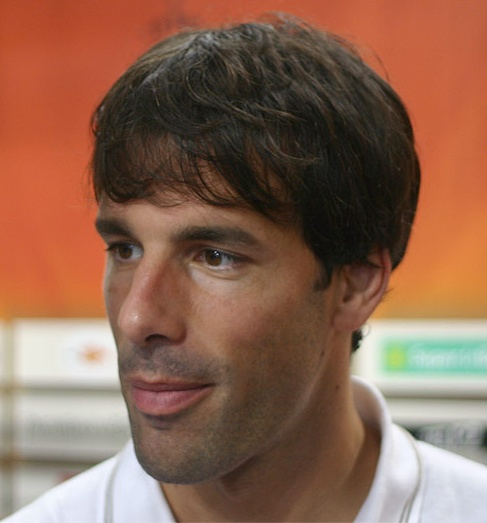
Ruud van Nistelrooy scored four goals against Sparta Prague in 2004–05.

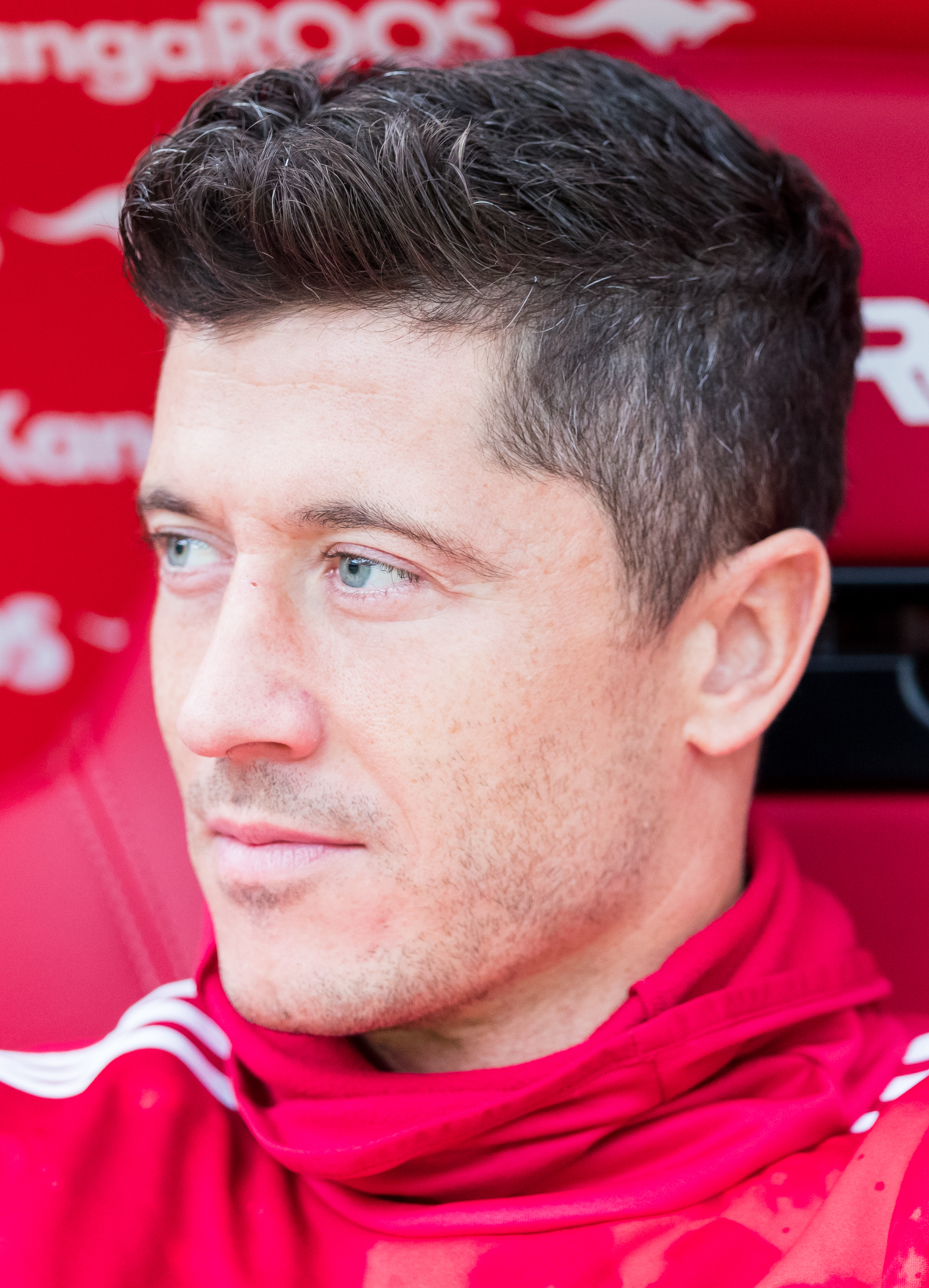
Robert Lewandowski scored four goals for Borussia Dortmund against Real Madrid in the semi-finals in 2013. He also scored the fastest four goals in 15 minutes for Bayern Munich against Red Star Belgrade in 2019–20.

The following players have scored four goals in one European Cup/UEFA Champions League match. Only Alfredo Di Stéfano, Ferenc Puskás, Sándor Kocsis, Lionel Messi and Robert Lewandowski managed to do this from the quarter-final stage onwards and Ferenc Puskás is the only footballer to score four goals in a final (1960).

- European Cup era:
  - (Socialist Federal Republic of Yugoslavia) Miloš Milutinović (Partizan), 5–2 against Sporting CP, 1955–56 first round
  - (England) Dennis Viollet (Manchester United), 10–0 against Anderlecht, 1956–57 preliminary round
  - (Socialist Federal Republic of Yugoslavia) Jovan Cokić (Red Star Belgrade), 9–1 against Stade Dudelange, 1957–58 preliminary round
  - (Socialist Federal Republic of Yugoslavia) Bora Kostić (Red Star Belgrade), 9–1 against Stade Dudelange, 1957–58 preliminary round
  - (Argentina) (Colombia) (Spain) Alfredo Di Stéfano (Real Madrid), 8–0 against Sevilla, 1957–58 quarter-final, and 7–1 against Wiener Sport-Club, 1958–59 quarter-final
  - (France) Just Fontaine (Reims), 4–1 away against Ards, 1958–59 first round
  - (Austria) Josef Hamerl (Wiener Sport-Club), 7–0 against Juventus, 1958–59 first round
  - (Hungary) Sándor Kocsis (Barcelona), 5–2 away against Wolverhampton Wanderers, 1959–60 quarter-final
  - (Hungary) Ferenc Puskás (Real Madrid), 7–3 against Eintracht Frankfurt, 1959–60 final, and 5–0 against Feyenoord, 1965–66 preliminary round
  - (France) Lucien Cossou (Monaco), 7–2 against AEK Athens, 1963–64 preliminary round
  - (Socialist Federal Republic of Yugoslavia) Vladimir Kovačević (Partizan), 6–2 against Jeunesse Esch, 1963–64 first round
  - (Portugal) José Torres (Benfica), 5–1 away against Aris, 1964–65 preliminary round
  - (Portugal) Eusébio (Benfica), 10–0 against Stade Dudelange, 1965–66 preliminary round
  - (West Germany) Friedhelm Konietzka (1860 Munich), 8–0 against Omonia, 1966–67 first round
  - (England) Denis Law (Manchester United), 7–1 against Waterford United, 1968–69 first round
  - (Socialist Federal Republic of Yugoslavia) Zoran Antonijević (Red Star Belgrade), 4–2 away against Linfield, 1969–70 first round
  - (Netherlands) Ruud Geels (Feyenoord), 12–2 away against KR Reykjavík, 1969–70 first round
  - (Greece) Antonis Antoniadis (Panathinaikos), 5–0 against Jeunesse Esch, 1970–71 first round
  - (Portugal) João Lourenço (Sporting CP), 5–0 against Floriana, 1970–71 first round
  - (West Germany) Kurt Müller (Grasshoppers), 8–0 against Reipas Lahti, 1971–72 first round
  - (Romania) Dudu Georgescu (Dinamo București), 11–0 against Crusaders, 1973–74 first round
  - (Romania) Radu Nunweiller (Dinamo București), 11–0 against Crusaders, 1973–74 first round
  - (West Germany) Jupp Heynckes (Borussia Mönchengladbach), 6–1 away against Wacker Innsbruck, 1975–76 first round
  - (Netherlands) René van de Kerkhof (PSV Eindhoven), 6–0 against Dundalk, 1976–77 first round
  - (Netherlands) Willy van der Kuijlen (PSV Eindhoven), 6–1 against Fenerbahçe, 1978–79 first round
  - (Cyprus) Sotiris Kaiafas (Omonia), 6–1 against Red Boys Differdange, 1979–80 first round
  - (Netherlands) Ton Blanker (Ajax), 8–1 against HJK Helsinki, 1979–80 first round
  - (Portugal) Fernando Gomes (Porto), 9–0 against Rabat Ajax, 1986–87 first round
  - (Netherlands) Marco van Basten (Milan), 5–2 against Vitosha, 1988–89 first round
  - (Algeria) Rabah Madjer (Porto), 8–1 away against Portadown, 1990–91 first round
  - (Mexico) Hugo Sánchez (Real Madrid), 9–1 against Swarovski Tirol, 1990–91 second round
  - (England) Alan Smith (Arsenal), 6–1 against Austria Wien, 1991–92 first round
  - (Commonwealth of Independent States) Sergei Yuran (Benfica), 6–0 away against Ħamrun Spartans, 1991–92 first round
- Champions League era, preliminary rounds:
  - (Ukraine) Serhii Rebrov (Dynamo Kyiv), 8–0 against Barry Town, 1998–99 first qualifying round
  - (Brazil) Pena (Porto), 8–0 against Barry Town United, 2001–02 second qualifying round
  - (Poland) Tomasz Frankowski (Wisła Kraków), 8–2 away against WIT Georgia, 2004–05 second qualifying round
  - (Turkey) Semih Şentürk (Fenerbahçe), 5–0 away against MTK Hungária, 2008–09 second qualifying round
  - (Malta) Michael Mifsud (Valletta), 8–0 against Lusitanos, 2012–13 first qualifying round
- Champions League era:
  - (Netherlands) Marco van Basten (Milan), 4–0 against IFK Göteborg, 1992–93 group stage
  - (Italy) Simone Inzaghi (Lazio), 5–1 against Marseille, 1999–2000 second group stage
  - (Croatia) Dado Pršo (Monaco), 8–3 against Deportivo La Coruña, 2003–04 group stage
  - (Netherlands) Ruud van Nistelrooy (Manchester United), 4–1 against Sparta Prague, 2004–05 group stage
  - (Ukraine) Andriy Shevchenko (Milan), 4–0 away against Fenerbahçe, 2005–06 group stage
  - (Argentina) Lionel Messi (Barcelona), 4–1 against Arsenal, 2009–10 quarter-final
  - (France) Bafétimbi Gomis (Lyon), 7–1 against Dinamo Zagreb, 2011–12 group stage
  - (Germany) Mario Gómez (Bayern Munich), 7–0 against Basel, 2011–12 round of 16
  - (Poland) Robert Lewandowski (Borussia Dortmund), 4–1 against Real Madrid, 2012–13 semi-final
  - (Sweden) Zlatan Ibrahimović (Paris Saint-Germain), 5–0 against Anderlecht, 2013–14 group stage
  - (Portugal) Cristiano Ronaldo (Real Madrid), 8–0 against Malmö FF, 2015–16 group stage
  - (Germany) Serge Gnabry (Bayern Munich), 7–2 against Tottenham Hotspur, 2019–20 group stage
  - (Poland) Robert Lewandowski (Bayern Munich), 6–0 against Red Star Belgrade, 2019–20 group stage
  - (Slovenia) Josip Iličić (Atalanta), 4–3 against Valencia, 2019–20 round of 16
  - (France) Olivier Giroud (Chelsea), 4–0 against Sevilla, 2020–21 group stage
  - (Ivory Coast) Sébastien Haller (Ajax), 5–1 against Sporting CP, 2021–22 group stage
  - (England) Harry Kane (Bayern Munich), 9–2 against Dinamo Zagreb, 2024–25 league phase
  - (France) Kylian Mbappé (Real Madrid), 4–3 against Olympiacos, 2025–26 league phase
  - (England) Anthony Gordon (Newcastle United), 6–1 against Qarabağ, 2025–26 knockout play-offs

==== Five goals in a match ====
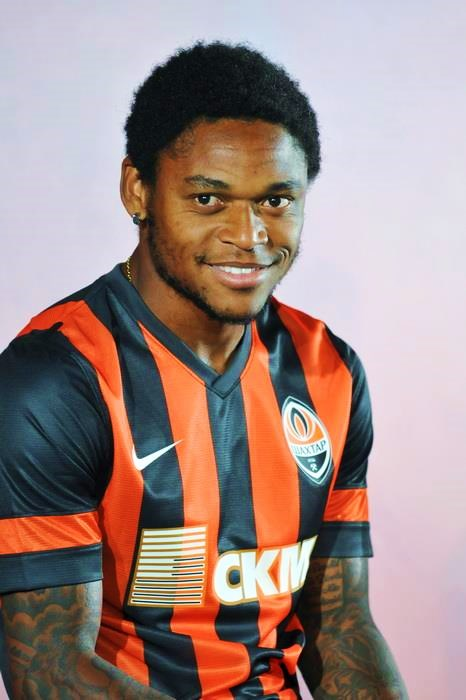
Luiz Adriano scored five goals in Shakhtar Donetsk's 7–0 win against BATE Borisov, including a record four goals in the first-half, in 2014–15.

The following players have managed to score five goals in one European Cup/UEFA Champions League match:

- European Cup era, preliminary rounds:
  - (Sweden) Ove Olsson (Gothenburg), 6–1 against Linfield, 1959–60 preliminary round
  - (Denmark) Bent Løfqvist (Boldklubben 1913), 9–2 against Spora, 1961–62 preliminary round
  - (Italy) José Altafini (Milan), 8–0 against Union Luxembourg, 1962–63 preliminary round
  - (England) Ray Crawford (Ipswich), 10–0 against Floriana, 1962–63 preliminary round
  - (Bulgaria) Nikola Kotkov (Lokomotiv Sofia), 8–3 against Malmö FF, 1964–65 preliminary round
  - (Hungary) Flórián Albert (Ferencváros), 9–1 against Keflavík, 1965–66 preliminary round
- European Cup era:
  - (Belgium) Paul Van Himst (Anderlecht), 10–1 away against Haka, 1966–67 first round
  - (West Germany) Gerd Müller (Bayern Munich), 9–0 against Omonia, 1972–73 second round
  - (Switzerland) Claudio Sulser (Grasshoppers), 8–0 against Valletta, 1978–79 first round
  - (Denmark) Søren Lerby (Ajax), 10–0 against Omonia, 1979–80 second round
- Champions League era, preliminary rounds:
  - (Latvia) Mihails Miholaps (Skonto), 8–0 against Jeunesse Esch, 1999–2000 first qualifying round
  - (Czech Republic) David Lafata (Sparta Prague), 7–0 against Levadia Tallinn, 2014–15 second qualifying round
- Champions League era:
  - (Argentina) Lionel Messi (Barcelona), 7–1 against Bayer Leverkusen, 2011–12 round of 16
  - (Brazil) Luiz Adriano (Shakhtar Donetsk), 7–0 against BATE Borisov, 2014–15 group stage
  - (Norway) Erling Haaland (Manchester City), 7–0 against RB Leipzig, 2022–23 round of 16

==== Oldest and youngest ====
- Oldest goalscorer: **40 years and 289 days** – (Portugal) Pepe, for Porto v Shakhtar Donetsk, 13 December 2023
- Oldest goalscorer in the European Cup era: **38 years and 293 days** – (West Germany) Manfred Burgsmüller, for Werder Bremen v Dynamo Berlin, 11 October 1988
- Oldest goalscorer in knockout phase in the Champions League era: **37 years and 148 days** – (Wales) Ryan Giggs, for Manchester United v Schalke 04, 26 April 2011
- Youngest goalscorer: **16 years and 258 days** – (Poland) Włodzimierz Lubański, for Górnik Zabrze v Dukla Prague, 13 November 1963
- Youngest goalscorer in the Champions League era: **17 years and 40 days** – (Spain) Ansu Fati, for Barcelona v Inter Milan, 10 December 2019
- Youngest debutant goalscorer: **17 years and 2 days** – (Ghana) Nii Lamptey, for Anderlecht v Red Star Belgrade, 12 December 1991
- Youngest debutant goalscorer in the Champions League era: **17 years and 113 days** – (Iceland) Viktor Daðason, for Copenhagen v Borussia Dortmund, 21 October 2025
- Youngest goalscorer in knockout phase in the Champions League era: **17 years and 217 days** – (Spain) Bojan Krkić, for Barcelona v Schalke 04, 1 April 2008
- Youngest goalscorer to score at least twice as a substitute: **20 years and 7 days** – (France) David Trezeguet, for Monaco v Lierse, 22 October 1997
- Oldest goalscorer in the final: **36 years and 333 days** – (Italy) Paolo Maldini, for Milan v Liverpool, 2005 final
- Oldest goalscorer to score at least twice in the final: **33 years and 63 days** – (Italy) Filippo Inzaghi, for Milan v Liverpool, 2007 final
- Oldest player to score and assist in a match: **36 years and 259 days** – (Ivory Coast) Didier Drogba, for Chelsea v Schalke, 25 November 2014
- Youngest goalscorer in the final: **18 years and 327 days** – (Netherlands) Patrick Kluivert, for Ajax v Milan, 1995 final
- Youngest goalscorer to score at least twice in the final: **19 years and 362 days** – (France) Désiré Doué, for Paris Saint-Germain v Inter Milan, 2025 final
- Youngest player to score and assist in a match: **17 years and 241 days** – (Spain) Lamine Yamal, for Barcelona v Benfica, 11 March 2025

==== Fastest goals ====
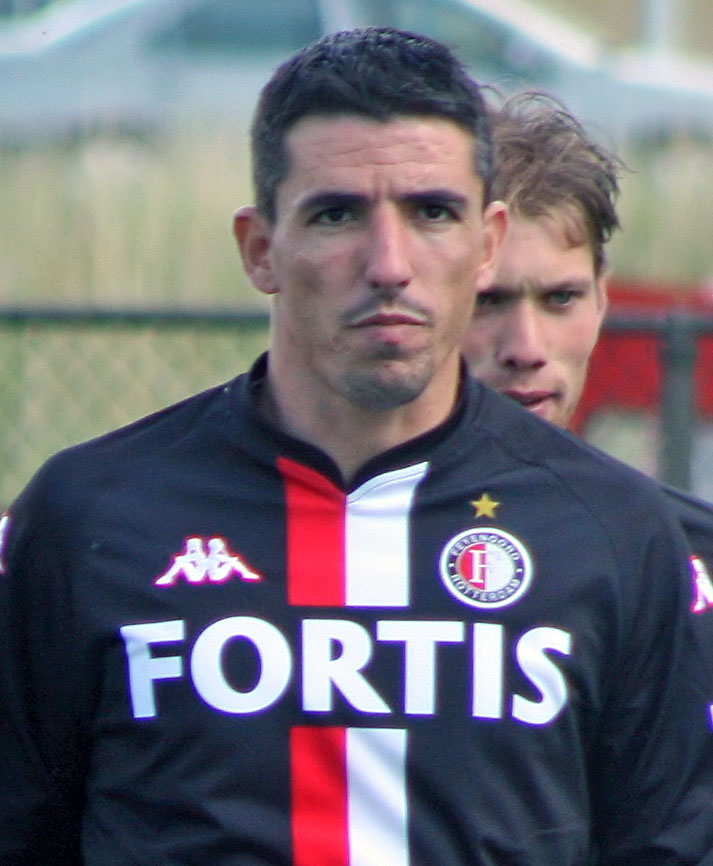
Roy Makaay scored the fastest ever Champions League goal.

- Fastest goal: **10.12 seconds** – (Netherlands) Roy Makaay, for Bayern Munich v Real Madrid, 7 March 2007
- Fastest goal in group stage: **10.96 seconds** – (Brazil) Jonas, for Valencia v Bayer Leverkusen, 1 November 2011
- Fastest goal in the second half: **10 seconds** – (Italy) Federico Chiesa, for Juventus v Chelsea, 29 September 2021
- Fastest goal in the final: **53 seconds** – (Italy) Paolo Maldini, for Milan v Liverpool, 2005 final
- Fastest goal by a substitute: **14 seconds** – (Brazil) Vinícius Júnior, for Real Madrid v Shakhtar Donetsk, 21 October 2020
- Fastest goal by a debutant: **19 seconds** – (Ukraine) Yevhen Konoplyanka, for Sevilla v Borussia Mönchengladbach, 15 September 2015
- Fastest goal by a debutant from the start of the match: **33 seconds** – (Serbia) Dušan Vlahović, for Juventus v Villarreal, 22 February 2022.
- Fastest two consecutive goals: **1 minute and 16 seconds** – (Wales) Gareth Bale, for Tottenham Hotspur v Inter Milan, 20 October 2010
- Fastest two goals from kickoff: **6 minutes and 14 seconds** – (Brazil) Rodrygo, for Real Madrid v Galatasaray, 6 November 2019

==== First goal ====
- First goal in the European Cup: (Portugal) João Baptista Martins, for Sporting CP v Partizan, 4 September 1955
- First goal in the UEFA Champions League: (Nigeria) Daniel Amokachi, for Club Brugge v CSKA Moscow, 25 November 1992

==== Consecutive scoring ====
- Most consecutive matches with goals: **11** – (Portugal) Cristiano Ronaldo, 2017–18 (Note: He scored in the 2017 final and the first ten matches (six group games and both legs of the round of 16 and quarter-finals) of the 2017–18 season (a total of seventeen goals).)
- Most consecutive home matches with goals: **7**
  - (Portugal) Cristiano Ronaldo, 2017–18
  - (Poland) Robert Lewandowski, 2015–16
  - (France) Thierry Henry, 2001–02
- Most consecutive away matches with goals: **12** – (Portugal) Cristiano Ronaldo, 2013–15 (Note: His streak started from the second leg of the 2012–13 round of 16, and lasted until the first leg of the 2014–15 round of 16 (a total of seventeen goals).)
- Most consecutive matches with goals by a debutant: **7** – (Ivory Coast) Sébastien Haller, 2021–22
- Most consecutive knockout phase matches with goals: **6**
  - (Portugal) Cristiano Ronaldo, 2012–2013
  - (England) Harry Kane, 2026

==== Other goalscoring records ====
- Most goals: **140** – (Portugal) Cristiano Ronaldo, 2003–2022; (73 GS, 25 R16, 25 QF, 13 SF, 4 F) (95 RF, 20 LF, 25 H)
- Highest-ever goals-per-game ratio for players who have played at least 20 matches: **1.02** – (Norway) Erling Haaland; 62 goals in 61 matches
- Most goals in finals: **7**
  - (Hungary) Ferenc Puskás; scored four in 1960 and three in 1962
  - (Argentina) (Colombia) (Spain) Alfredo Di Stéfano; scored seven goals in an aforementioned five finals
- Most goals in finals in the UEFA Champions league era: **4** – (Portugal) Cristiano Ronaldo; scored one goal each in 2008 and 2014, and two in 2017
- Most goals in the knockout phase: **67** – (Portugal) Cristiano Ronaldo
- Most goals in the semi-finals: **13** – (Portugal) Cristiano Ronaldo
- Most goals in the quarter-finals: **25** – (Portugal) Cristiano Ronaldo
- Most goals in the round of 16: **29** – (Argentina) Lionel Messi
- Most goals in the group stage: **80** – (Argentina) Lionel Messi
- Most goals in the knockout phase in a season: **12** – (Hungary) Ferenc Puskás, 1959–60
- Most goals in the knockout phase in a season in the Champions League era: **10**
  - (Portugal) Cristiano Ronaldo, 2016–17
  - (France) Karim Benzema, 2021–22
- Most goals in the group stage / league phase in a season: **13** – (France) Kylian Mbappé, 2025–26
- Most home goals in a season: **11** – (Portugal) Cristiano Ronaldo, 2015–16
- Most away goals in a season: **10** – (France) Kylian Mbappé, 2025–26
- First player to score 100 goals in the competition: (Portugal) Cristiano Ronaldo, 18 April 2017
- First player to score 100 goals with a single club: (Portugal) Cristiano Ronaldo, with Real Madrid, 18 February 2018
- First player to score 20 goals in the competition with two different clubs: (Brazil) Neymar, with Barcelona and Paris Saint-Germain
- Two players have scored in all six group stage matches of the competition:
  - (Portugal) Cristiano Ronaldo, 2017–18; scored nine goals for Real Madrid
  - (Ivory Coast) Sébastien Haller, 2021–22; scored ten goals for Ajax
- Most home goals: **78** – (Argentina) Lionel Messi, 2005–2023
- Most away goals: **63** – (Portugal) Cristiano Ronaldo, 2003–2022
- Most brace or more scored: **38** – (Portugal) Cristiano Ronaldo, 2003–2022
- Most direct free kick goals: **12** – (Portugal) Cristiano Ronaldo; two for Manchester United and ten for Real Madrid
- Five players scored two direct free kick goals in a single match in UEFA Champions League era:
  - (Brazil) Rivaldo for Barcelona against Milan, 18 October 2000
  - (Portugal) Cristiano Ronaldo for Real Madrid against Zürich, 15 September 2009
  - (Brazil) Neymar for Paris Saint-Germain against Red Star Belgrade, 3 October 2018
  - (Morocco) Hakim Ziyech for Galatasaray against Manchester United, 29 November 2023
  - (England) Declan Rice for Arsenal against Real Madrid, 8 April 2025
- Most individual Champions League opponents scored against: **41** – (Poland) Robert Lewandowski
- Most goals scored for a single club: **120** – (Argentina) Lionel Messi, with Barcelona, 2005–2021
- Most finals scored in: **5** – (Argentina) (Colombia) (Spain) Alfredo Di Stéfano; with one goal in each final from 1956 to 1959, and three goals in 1960
- Most finals scored in the UEFA Champions league era: **3** – (Portugal) Cristiano Ronaldo; one goal each in 2008 and 2014, and two in 2017
- Four players scored for two clubs in the final:
  - (Socialist Federal Republic of Yugoslavia) Velibor Vasović, for Partizan in 1966 and for Ajax in 1969
  - (Portugal) Cristiano Ronaldo, for Manchester United in 2008 and for Real Madrid in 2014 and 2017; he is the only player to score for two winning clubs
  - (Croatia) Mario Mandžukić, for Bayern Munich in 2013 and for Juventus in 2017
  - (Germany) Kai Havertz, for Chelsea in 2021 and for Arsenal in 2026; he is the only player to score for two clubs from the same country
- Seven goalkeepers have scored in the European Cup and UEFA Champions League (not include qualifying rounds):
  - (Socialist Federal Republic of Yugoslavia) Ilija Pantelić, for Vojvodina v Atlético Madrid, 16 November 1966; scored from penalty
  - (Belgium) Christian Piot, for Standard Liège v Linfield, 29 September 1971; scored from penalty
  - (Germany) Hans-Jörg Butt has done so three times with three clubs, all with penalties, and all against Juventus:
    - for Hamburger SV in a 4–4 group stage home draw on 13 September 2000;
    - for Bayer Leverkusen in a 3–1 second group stage home win on 12 March 2002;
    - the equaliser for Bayern Munich in a 4–1 group stage win in Turin on 8 December 2009, which Bayern had to win to qualify for the next stage.
  - (Nigeria) Vincent Enyeama, for Hapoel Tel Aviv v Lyon, 29 September 2010; scored from penalty
  - (Turkey) Sinan Bolat, (Italy) Ivan Provedel and (Ukraine) Anatoliy Trubin are the only goalkeepers to score a goal in open play:
    - Bolat's second-half stoppage time (fifth minute) equaliser for Standard Liège against AZ on 9 December 2009 secured third place in Group H, and qualified his team for the Europa League.
    - Provedel scored a second-half stoppage time (fifth minute) equaliser for Lazio against Atlético Madrid on 19 September 2023, in the opening match of the 2023–24 season.
    - Trubin scored a second-half stoppage time (eighth minute) goal for Benfica against Real Madrid on 28 January 2026, in the last game of the league phase, and qualified his team for the play-offs.
- Most goals with different clubs: **6** – (Sweden) Zlatan Ibrahimović; with Ajax, Juventus, Inter Milan, Barcelona, Milan and Paris Saint-Germain
- Most goals in different seasons: **18**
  - (Argentina) Lionel Messi, 2005–06 to 2022–23, for Barcelona and Paris Saint-Germain
  - (France) Karim Benzema, 2005–06 to 2022–23, for Lyon and Real Madrid
- Most goals against a single opponent: **10** – (Portugal) Cristiano Ronaldo v Juventus; three goals in 2013, two goals in 2015, two goals in 2017 and three goals in 2018
- Most goals scored by a debutant in a single season: **11** – (Ivory Coast) Sébastien Haller for Ajax in 2021–22
- Most goals as a substitute: **12** – (Spain) Marco Asensio
- Four players have scored against the same opponent with three clubs:
  - (Netherlands) Ruud van Nistelrooy v Bayern Munich, with PSV Eindhoven, Manchester United and Real Madrid.
  - (Germany) Hans-Jörg Butt v Juventus, with Hamburger SV, Bayer Leverkusen and Bayern Munich.
  - (Portugal) Cristiano Ronaldo v Lyon, with Manchester United, Real Madrid and Juventus.
  - (Bosnia and Herzegovina) Edin Džeko v Viktoria Plzeň, with Manchester City, Roma and Inter Milan.
- Longest time between goals by a player: **12 years and 357 days** – (Austria) Marko Arnautović, 7 December 2010 – 29 November 2023
- Only on one occasion have three players from the same team scored at least ten goals in the same season:
  - (Brazil) Roberto Firmino, (Senegal) Sadio Mané and (Egypt) Mohamed Salah, for Liverpool in 2017–18
- Two players from the same team have scored at least ten goals in the same season on two further occasion:
  - (Argentina) Lionel Messi and (Brazil) Neymar, for Barcelona in 2014–15
  - (Brazil) Raphinha and (Poland) Robert Lewandowski, for Barcelona in 2024–25
- (Denmark) Allan Simonsen is the only player to have scored in the final of the European Cup/Champions League, the Cup Winners' Cup and the UEFA Cup/Europa League, with goals in the 1977 European Cup final and the second leg of both the 1975 and 1979 UEFA Cup finals with Borussia Mönchengladbach, and in the 1982 Cup Winners' Cup final with Barcelona.
- The following players have additionally scored in the final of both the European Cup/Champions League and the Cup Winners' Cup:
  - (West Germany) Franz Roth scored in both the 1975 and 1976 European Cup final, and in the 1967 European Cup Winners' Cup final, all with Bayern Munich.
  - (West Germany) Felix Magath scored in the 1983 European Cup final and in the 1977 European Cup Winners' Cup final, both with Hamburger SV.
  - (Netherlands) Marco van Basten scored in the 1989 European Cup final with Milan and in the 1987 European Cup Winners' Cup final with Ajax.
  - (Netherlands) Ronald Koeman scored in the 1992 final and in the 1991 European Cup Winners' Cup final, both with Barcelona.
- The following players have additionally scored in the final of both the European Cup/Champions League and the UEFA Cup/Europa League:
  - (Argentina) Hernán Crespo scored in the 2005 UEFA Champions League final with Milan and in the 1999 UEFA Cup final with Parma.
  - (England) Steven Gerrard scored in the 2005 UEFA Champions League final and in the 2001 UEFA Cup final, both with Liverpool.
  - (Spain) Pedro scored in the 2011 UEFA Champions League final with Barcelona and in the 2019 UEFA Europa League final with Chelsea.
  - (Uruguay) Diego Godín scored in the 2014 UEFA Champions League final with Atlético Madrid and in the 2020 UEFA Europa League final with Inter Milan.
- Gerd Müller is the only player to have scored in the final of the European Cup/Champions League, the FIFA World Cup and the UEFA European Championship, with goals in both the 1974 (replay) and 1975 European Cup final with Bayern Munich, and in the 1974 FIFA World Cup final and UEFA Euro 1972 final with West Germany.
- The following players have additionally scored in the final of both the European Cup/Champions League and the FIFA World Cup:
  - Juan Alberto Schiaffino scored in the 1958 European Cup final with Milan and in the 1950 FIFA World Cup final with Uruguay. (Note: There was no knockout phase in this tournament, so the decisive match between Brazil and Uruguay was considered the final.)
  - Ferenc Puskás scored in both the 1960 and 1962 European Cup final with Real Madrid and in the 1954 FIFA World Cup final with Hungary.
  - Zoltán Czibor scored in the 1961 European Cup final with Barcelona and in the 1954 FIFA World Cup final with Hungary.
  - Zinedine Zidane scored in the 2002 final with Real Madrid and in both the 1998 and 2006 FIFA World Cup final with France.
  - Mario Mandžukić scored in the 2013 UEFA Champions League final with Bayern Munich, the 2017 UEFA Champions League final with Juventus, and in the 2018 FIFA World Cup final with Croatia.
  - Lionel Messi scored in the 2009 and 2011 UEFA Champions League final with Barcelona, and in the 2022 FIFA World Cup final with Argentina.
- The following players have additionally scored in the final of both the European Cup/Champions League and the UEFA European Championship:
  - Michel Platini scored in the 1985 European Cup final with Juventus and in the UEFA Euro 1984 final with France.
  - Both Ruud Gullit and Marco van Basten scored in the 1989 European Cup final with Milan and in the UEFA Euro 1988 final with Netherlands.
- Luis Suárez is the only player have scored in the final of both the European Cup/Champions League and the Copa América. He did so in the 2015 UEFA Champions League final with Barcelona and the 2011 Copa América final with Uruguay.
- Samuel Eto'o is the only player have scored in the final of both the European Cup/Champions League and the Africa Cup of Nations. He did so in the 2006 and 2009 UEFA Champions League final with Barcelona and the 2000 Africa Cup of Nations final with Cameroon.

=== Assists ===
==== Most assists ====
Ryan Giggs has the most assists in the UEFA Champions League's history.

As of 4 November 2026

Notes: The criteria for an assist to be awarded may vary according to the source, this table is based on the assists criteria according to Opta, where assists are not counted for balls that are deflected or rebounded off opposing players and have clearly affected the trajectory of the ball and its arrival to the recipient (the goal scorer). Assists are also not counted for penalty kicks, direct goals from corners or free kicks, or own goals. This table does not include assists provided in the qualification stage of the competition. The following table includes the number of assists since the 1992–93 season. However, according to UEFA's own official list, Cristiano Ronaldo sits at 1st place with 42 official assists and Ryan Giggs sits at 5th with 31 assists. This is due to the website only counting assists from the 2003–04 season onwards. In addition, UEFA's criteria for assists differ from those of Opta, as it considers causing a penalty kick, free kicks, own goals, deflected, and rebounded balls as assists.

Rank	Player	Nation	Assists	Apps	Years	Club(s)
1	Ryan Giggs	Wales	41	141	1993–2014	Manchester United
2	Cristiano Ronaldo	Portugal	40	183	2003–2022	Manchester United, Real Madrid, Juventus
3	Lionel Messi	Argentina	39	163	2005–2023	Barcelona, Paris Saint-Germain
4	Ángel Di María	Argentina	38	116	2007–2025	Benfica, Real Madrid, Paris Saint-Germain, Juventus
5	David Beckham	England	36	107	1994–2013	Manchester United, Real Madrid, Milan, Paris Saint-Germain
6	Luís Figo	Portugal	34	103	1997–2009	Barcelona, Real Madrid, Inter Milan
7	Xavi	Spain	31	151	1998–2015	Barcelona
8	Neymar	Brazil	30	81	2013–2023	Barcelona, Paris Saint-Germain
9	**Kevin De Bruyne**	Belgium	28	86	2011–	Genk, Chelsea, Manchester City, **Napoli**
10	Raúl	Spain	27	142	1995–2011	Real Madrid, Schalke 04
10	Karim Benzema	France	27	152	2005–2023	Lyon, Real Madrid

==== Single season (since 1992–93) ====
As of 30 April 2025

Rank	Player	Season	Assists
1	(Portugal) Luís Figo	1999–2000	9
2	(England) David Beckham	1998–99	8
2	(Spain) Gaizka Mendieta	2000–01	8
2	(Brazil) Neymar	2016–17	8
2	(England) James Milner	2017–18	8
2	(Brazil) Raphinha	2024–25	8

==== Other records ====
- Most assists in a single match (since 1955–56): **5** – (Scotland) Kenny Daglish, for Liverpool v Oulun Palloseura, 1 October 1980
- Most assists in a final matches: **5** – (France) Raymond Kopa; in 1956 (2) for Stade Reims and in 1957 and 1958 (2) for Real Madrid (Note: In addition, Kopa is the one of three players to have assisted in final matches with two different clubs alongside Frank Rijkaard with Milan in 1989 and with Ajax in 1995 and Toni Kroos with Bayern Munich in 2012 and with Real Madrid in 2024, and the one of two players to have assisted in three different finals alongside Andrés Iniesta with Barcelona in 2009, 2011 and 2015.)
- Four players finished twice at the top of the assists list (including joint top, since 1992–93):
  - (Portugal) Luís Figo, for Barcelona in 1999–2000 and Real Madrid in 2000–01 season
  - (Brazil) Kaká, for Milan in 2004–05 and Real Madrid in 2011–12 season
  - (Argentina) Lionel Messi, for Barcelona in 2011–12 and 2014–15 season
  - (Brazil) Neymar, for Barcelona in 2015–16 and 2016–17 season
- Most assists against a single opponent: **8** – (Brazil) Neymar v Celtic
- Most assists by a goalkeeper: **3** – (Belgium) Thibaut Courtois
- Oldest player to assist in the Champions League era: **39 years and 363 days** – (Wales) Ryan Giggs, for Manchester United v Bayer Leverkusen, 27 November 2013
- Oldest player to assist in a final in the Champions League era: **37 years and 180 days** – (Wales) Ryan Giggs, for Manchester United v Barcelona, 2011 final
- Youngest player to assist in the Champions League era: **16 years and 153 days** – (Spain) Lamine Yamal, for Barcelona v Antwerp, 13 December 2023
- Youngest player to assist in a final in the Champions League era: **19 years and 362 days** – (France) Désiré Doué, for Paris Saint-Germain v Inter Milan, 2025 final

=== Other records ===
==== Penalties ====
- Most penalty kick goals (excluding shoot-outs): **19**
  - (Portugal) Cristiano Ronaldo; out of 22
  - (Poland) Robert Lewandowski; out of 20
- Most penalty kick goals in a season: **5**
  - (Portugal) João Mário, for Benfica, 2022–23
  - (Guinea) Serhou Guirassy, for Borussia Dortmund, 2024–25
  - (England) Anthony Gordon, for Newcastle United, 2025–26
- Most penalty kick goals in a match: **3**
  - (England) Harry Kane, for Bayern Munich v Dinamo Zagreb, 17 September 2024
- Most penalties missed: **5**
  - (France) Thierry Henry
  - (Argentina) Lionel Messi
- Most penalties saved: **5**
  - (Ukraine) Andriy Pyatov
  - (Germany) Hans-Jörg Butt
  - (England) Joe Hart
- Most penalties saved in a single season, as well as in consecutive matches: **3**
  - (Portugal) Diogo Costa, for Porto, 2022–23
- Most penalties saved in a single match: **2**
  - (Italy) Gianluigi Buffon, for Parma v Borussia Dortmund, 5 November 1997; the second kick was scored on the rebound
  - (Germany) Hans-Jörg Butt, for Bayern Munich v Bordeaux, 21 October 2009
  - (Belgium) Silvio Proto, for Anderlecht v Olympiacos, 10 December 2013
- Oldest goalkeeper to save a penalty: **39 years and 274 days** – (Slovenia) Jasmin Handanović, for Maribor v Liverpool, 1 November 2017
- Youngest goalkeeper to save a penalty: **18 years and 65 days** – (Belgium) (Serbia) Mile Svilar, for Benfica v Manchester United, 31 October 2017
- Youngest goalkeeper to save a penalty on his debut: **18 years and 96 days** – (Kazakhstan) Sherkhan Kalmurza, for Kairat v Sporting CP, 18 September 2025
- Fastest penalty awarded: **23 seconds** – for (England) Liverpool v Tottenham Hotspur, in the final, 1 June 2019; converted by Mohamed Salah
- Fastest penalty scored: **1 minute and 45 seconds** – (France) Johan Micoud, for Werder Bremen v Panathinaikos, 7 December 2005; only two seconds faster than Mohamed Salah goal
- Fastest penalty saved: **1 minute and 54 seconds** – (Kyrgyzstan) Anton Kochenkov, for Lokomotiv Moscow v Atlético Madrid, 11 December 2019

==== Penalty shoot-out ====
- Most penalties scored: **3**
  - (France) Antoine Griezmann
  - (Spain) Lucas Vázquez
- Most penalties missed: **2** – (Portugal) Cristiano Ronaldo
- Most penalties saved: **5** – (Germany) Manuel Neuer
- Most penalties saved in a single shoot-out: **4**
  - (Sweden) Jan Möller, for Malmö FF v 1. FC Magdeburg, 1975–76 first round
  - (Romania) Helmut Duckadam, for Steaua București v Barcelona, 1986 final

==== Own goals ====
- Most own goals: **2** – 30 players; Igor Akinfeev, Alex, Alex Sandro, Ânderson Polga, Valeriy Bondar, Wes Brown, Cadú, Gary Caldwell, Rúben Dias, Edu Dracena, Andrzej Grębosz, Iván Helguera, József Horváth, Tomáš Hubočan, Jardel, Phil Jones, Thomas Kleine, Ladislav Krejčí, Castello Lukeba, Iván Marcano, Jérémy Mathieu, Brandon Mechele, Craig Moore, Joel Ordóñez, Gerard Piqué, Sergio Ramos, Stefan Savić, Gernot Trauner, Raphaël Varane and Zoco
- Most own goals in a single match: **2** – (Austria) Gernot Trauner, against his team Feyenoord for Lille, 29 January 2025
- Fastest own goal scored: **69 seconds** – (Spain) Iñigo Martínez, against his team Real Sociedad for Manchester United, 23 October 2013
- Scored an own goal in a final:
  - (Spain) Antoni Ramallets, against his team Barcelona for Benfica, 1961 final

==== Goalkeeping ====
- Most clean sheets: **64** – (Germany) Manuel Neuer; 66 including 2 qualifying games, 7 with Schalke 04 and 57 with Bayern Munich
- Most consecutive clean sheets: **9** – (Germany) Jens Lehmann, for Arsenal, 9 March 2005 – 17 May 2006
- Longest period without conceding a goal: **853 minutes** – (Germany) Jens Lehmann, 22 February 2005 – 13 September 2006
- Most clean sheets in final matches: **3**
  - (Netherlands) Heinz Stuy, in 1971, 1972 and 1973, all with Ajax
  - (West Germany) Sepp Maier, in 1974 (replay), 1975 and 1976, all with Bayern Munich
- Most clean sheets in a single season: **9**
  - (Italy) Sebastiano Rossi, with Milan, 1993–94
  - (Spain) Santiago Cañizares, with Valencia, 2000–01 (Note: Including qualifying rounds, Cañizares holds the record of ten clean sheets in a single season, keeping an additional clean sheet against Tirol Innsbruck in the third qualifying round.)
  - (Costa Rica) Keylor Navas, with Real Madrid, 2015–16
  - (Senegal) Édouard Mendy, with Chelsea, 2020–21; his debut season in the competition
  - (Spain) David Raya, with Arsenal, 2025–26
- Oldest goalkeeper: **43 years, 252 days** – (Italy) Marco Ballotta, for Lazio v Real Madrid, 11 December 2007
- Youngest goalkeeper: **17 years and 287 days** – (Belgium) Maarten Vandevoordt, for Genk v Napoli, 10 December 2019
- Oldest goalkeeper to keep a clean sheet: **42 years 315 days** – (Italy) Gianluigi Buffon, for Juventus in a 3–0 away win over Barcelona, 8 December 2020
- Oldest goalkeeper to keep a clean sheet on their debut: **41 years 66 days** – (Australia) Mark Schwarzer, for Chelsea in a 1–0 win over FCSB, 11 December 2013
- Youngest goalkeeper to keep a clean sheet on their debut: **18 years 159 days** – (Russia) Igor Akinfeev, for CSKA Moscow in a 0–0 away draw with Porto, 14 September 2004
- Four goalkeepers have won the competition with two clubs:
  - (England) Jimmy Rimmer with Manchester United in 1968, and with Aston Villa in 1982
  - (Netherlands) Edwin van der Sar with Ajax in 1995, and with Manchester United in 2008
  - (England) Scott Carson with Liverpool in 2005, and with Manchester City in 2023
  - (Spain) Kepa Arrizabalaga with Chelsea in 2021, and with Real Madrid in 2024
- Oldest goalkeeper to play in and win a final: **37 years and 205 days** – (Netherlands) Edwin van der Sar, 2008 final with Manchester United
- Youngest goalkeeper to play in and win a final: **19 years and 4 days** – (Spain) Iker Casillas, 2000 final with Real Madrid
- Oldest goalkeeper to play in a final: **41 years and 86 days** – (Italy) Dino Zoff, 1983 with Juventus
- Most finals played by a goalkeeper: **5** – (Netherlands) Edwin van der Sar; doing so with Ajax in 1995 and 1996, and with Manchester United in 2008, 2009 and 2011
- Most finals lost by a goalkeeper: **3**
  - (Netherlands) Edwin van der Sar; doing so with Ajax in 1996, and with Manchester United in 2009 and 2011
  - (Italy) Gianluigi Buffon; doing so with Juventus in 2003, 2015 and 2017
- Most saves in a final match: **9** – (Belgium) Thibaut Courtois, for Real Madrid v Liverpool, 28 May 2022
- Most saves in a single match: **15** – (Ukraine) Dmytro Riznyk, for Shakhtar Donetsk v PSV Eindhoven, 27 November 2024
- Most saves in a single season: **68** – (Russia) Nikita Haikin, for Bodø/Glimt in 2025–26
- Five goalkeepers played for two clubs in a final:
  - (Italy) Giuliano Sarti with Fiorentina in 1957, and with Inter Milan in 1964, 1965 and 1967.
  - (Netherlands) Edwin van der Sar with Ajax in 1995 and 1996, and with Manchester United in 2008, 2009 and 2011.
  - (Germany) Hans-Jörg Butt with Bayer Leverkusen in 2002, and with Bayern Munich in 2010.
  - (Costa Rica) Keylor Navas with Real Madrid in 2016, 2017 and 2018, and with Paris Saint-Germain in 2020.
  - (Belgium) Thibaut Courtois with Atlético Madrid in 2014, and with Real Madrid in 2022 and 2024.
- Most titles by a goalkeeper: **5** – (Spain) Juan Alonso, 1955–60; he played in the first three finals and was a non-substitute in the latter two
- Two goalkeepers won all three major UEFA club competitions they have played in:
  - (Italy) Stefano Tacconi: 1983–84 European Cup Winners' Cup, 1984–85 European Cup and 1989–90 UEFA Cup, all with Juventus
  - (Portugal) Vítor Baía: 1996–97 UEFA Cup Winners' Cup with Barcelona, 2002–03 UEFA Cup and 2003–04 UEFA Champions League with Porto
- Three goalkeepers have won the tournament as well as both the FIFA World Cup and the UEFA European Championship:
  - Sepp Maier won the 1973–74, 1974–75 and 1975–76 European Cup with Bayern Munich, and both the 1974 FIFA World Cup and UEFA Euro 1972 with West Germany
  - Fabien Barthez won the 1992–93 UEFA Champions League with Marseille, and both the 1998 FIFA World Cup and UEFA Euro 2000 with France
  - Iker Casillas won the 1999–2000, 2001–02 and 2013–14 UEFA Champions League with Real Madrid, and both the 2010 FIFA World Cup and UEFA Euro 2008 and 2012 with Spain
- The following goalkeepers have additionally won both the tournament and the FIFA World Cup:
  - Bodo Illgner won the 1997–98 and 1999–2000 UEFA Champions League with Real Madrid, and the 1990 FIFA World Cup with West Germany
  - Manuel Neuer won the 2012–13 and 2019–20 UEFA Champions League with Bayern Munich, and the 2014 FIFA World Cup with Germany
- The following goalkeepers have additionally won both the tournament and the UEFA European Championship:
  - Hans van Breukelen won the 1987–88 European Cup with PSV Eindhoven, and UEFA Euro 1988 with Netherlands
  - Peter Schmeichel won the 1998–99 UEFA Champions League with Manchester United, and UEFA Euro 1992 with Denmark
  - Gianluigi Donnarumma won the 2024–25 UEFA Champions League with Paris Saint-Germain, and UEFA Euro 2021 with Italy
- The following goalkeepers have additionally won both the tournament and the Copa América:
  - Dida won the 2002–03 UEFA Champions League and 2006–07 UEFA Champions League with AC Milan, and 1999 Copa América with Brazil
  - Júlio César won the 2009–10 UEFA Champions League with Inter Milan, and 2004 Copa América with Brazil
  - Alisson won the 2018–19 UEFA Champions League with Liverpool, and 2019 Copa América with Brazil
- Six goalkeepers have lifted the trophy as captain:
  - (Spain) Juan Alonso with Real Madrid (1958)
  - (Socialist Federal Republic of Yugoslavia) Stevan Stojanović with Red Star Belgrade (1991)
  - (Spain) Andoni Zubizarreta with Barcelona (1992)
  - (Denmark) Peter Schmeichel with Manchester United (1999)
  - (Spain) Iker Casillas with Real Madrid (2014)
  - (Germany) Manuel Neuer with Bayern Munich (2020)
- Most consecutive matches without a clean sheet: **43** – (Russia) Igor Akinfeev, 21 November 2006 – 31 October 2017

==== Disciplinary ====
- Most yellow cards: **43+1** – (Spain) Sergio Ramos, 2005–2023; once double yellow cards turned red, along with three straight red cards
- Most red cards: **4**
  - (Netherlands) Edgar Davids
  - (Sweden) Zlatan Ibrahimović
  - (Spain) Sergio Ramos
- Players have been sent off in the final, all of them lost their respective finals:
  - (Germany) Jens Lehmann, with Arsenal v Barcelona, 2006 final
  - (Ivory Coast) Didier Drogba, with Chelsea v Manchester United, 2008 final
  - (Colombia) Juan Cuadrado, with Juventus v Real Madrid, 2017 final
- Most red cards received with the most different clubs: **3**
  - (Sweden) Zlatan Ibrahimović, with Juventus, Inter Milan and Paris Saint-Germain
  - (Chile) Arturo Vidal, with Bayern Munich, Barcelona and Inter Milan
  - (France) Patrick Vieira, with Arsenal, Juventus and Inter Milan
- Fastest red card: **3 minutes and 59 seconds** – (Ukraine) Olexandr Kucher, for Shakhtar Donetsk v Bayern Munich, 11 March 2015

==== Captaincy ====
The following table shows the captains who have won the title:

Final	Nationality	Winning captain	Nation	Club	Ref.
1956	Spain	Miguel Muñoz	Spain	Real Madrid	
1957	Spain	Miguel Muñoz	Spain	Real Madrid	
1958	Spain	Juan Alonso	Spain	Real Madrid	
1959	Spain	José María Zárraga	Spain	Real Madrid	
1960	Spain	José María Zárraga	Spain	Real Madrid	
1961	Portugal	José Águas	Portugal	Benfica	
1962	Portugal	José Águas	Portugal	Benfica	
1963	Italy	Cesare Maldini	Italy	Milan	
1964	Italy	Armando Picchi	Italy	Inter Milan	
1965	Italy	Armando Picchi	Italy	Inter Milan	
1966	Spain	Paco Gento	Spain	Real Madrid	
1967	Scotland	Billy McNeill	Scotland	Celtic	
1968	England	Bobby Charlton	England	Manchester United	
1969	Italy	Gianni Rivera	Italy	Milan	
1970	Netherlands	Rinus Israël	Netherlands	Feyenoord	
1971	Yugoslavia	Velibor Vasović	Netherlands	Ajax	
1972	Netherlands	Piet Keizer	Netherlands	Ajax	
1973	Netherlands	Johan Cruyff	Netherlands	Ajax	
1974	West Germany	Franz Beckenbauer	West Germany	Bayern Munich	
1975	West Germany	Franz Beckenbauer	West Germany	Bayern Munich	
1976	West Germany	Franz Beckenbauer	West Germany	Bayern Munich	
1977	England	Emlyn Hughes	England	Liverpool	
1978	England	Emlyn Hughes	England	Liverpool	
1979	Scotland	John McGovern	England	Nottingham Forest	
1980	Scotland	John McGovern	England	Nottingham Forest	
1981	England	Phil Thompson	England	Liverpool	
1982	England	Dennis Mortimer	England	Aston Villa	
1983	West Germany	Horst Hrubesch	West Germany	Hamburger SV	
1984	Scotland	Graeme Souness	England	Liverpool	
1985	Italy	Gaetano Scirea	Italy	Juventus	
1986	Romania	Ştefan Iovan	Romania	Steaua București	
1987	Portugal	João Pinto	Portugal	Porto	
1988	Belgium	Eric Gerets	Netherlands	PSV Eindhoven	
1989	Italy	Franco Baresi	Italy	Milan	
1990	Italy	Franco Baresi	Italy	Milan	
1991	Yugoslavia	Stevan Stojanović	Yugoslavia	Red Star Belgrade	
1992	Spain	Andoni Zubizarreta	Spain	Barcelona	
1993	France	Didier Deschamps	France	Marseille	
1994	Italy	Mauro Tassotti	Italy	Milan	
1995	Netherlands	Danny Blind	Netherlands	Ajax	
1996	Italy	Gianluca Vialli	Italy	Juventus	
1997	Germany	Matthias Sammer	Germany	Borussia Dortmund	
1998	Spain	Manolo Sanchís	Spain	Real Madrid	
1999	Denmark	Peter Schmeichel	England	Manchester United	
2000	Argentina	Fernando Redondo	Spain	Real Madrid	
2001	Germany	Stefan Effenberg	Germany	Bayern Munich	
2002	Spain	Fernando Hierro	Spain	Real Madrid	
2003	Italy	Paolo Maldini	Italy	Milan	
2004	Portugal	Jorge Costa	Portugal	Porto	
2005	England	Steven Gerrard	England	Liverpool	
2006	Spain	Carles Puyol	Spain	Barcelona	
2007	Italy	Paolo Maldini	Italy	Milan	
2008	England	Rio Ferdinand	England	Manchester United	
2009	Spain	Carles Puyol	Spain	Barcelona	
2010	Argentina	Javier Zanetti	Italy	Inter Milan	
2011	Spain	Xavi	Spain	Barcelona	
2012	England	Frank Lampard	England	Chelsea	
2013	Germany	Philipp Lahm	Germany	Bayern Munich	
2014	Spain	Iker Casillas	Spain	Real Madrid	
2015	Spain	Andrés Iniesta	Spain	Barcelona	
2016	Spain	Sergio Ramos	Spain	Real Madrid	
2017	Spain	Sergio Ramos	Spain	Real Madrid	
2018	Spain	Sergio Ramos	Spain	Real Madrid	
2019	England	Jordan Henderson	England	Liverpool	
2020	Germany	Manuel Neuer	Germany	Bayern Munich	
2021	Spain	César Azpilicueta	England	Chelsea	
2022	France	Karim Benzema	Spain	Real Madrid	
2023	Germany	İlkay Gündoğan	England	Manchester City	
2024	Spain	Nacho	Spain	Real Madrid	
2025	Brazil	Marquinhos	France	Paris Saint-Germain	
2026	Brazil	Marquinhos	France	Paris Saint-Germain	

- Most matches as a captain: **105** – (England) John Terry, with Chelsea
- Most trophies lifted as captain: **3** (Note: Carles Puyol lifted the cup as captain with Barcelona in 2006 and 2009 and in the 2011 final he participated as a substitute in the 88th minute, where he was captain for last five minutes in the match, and after the match he awarded the captain's armband to Eric Abidal to lift the cup and therefore he was not included in this list.)
  - (West Germany) Franz Beckenbauer, with Bayern Munich in 1974, 1975 and 1976
  - (Spain) Sergio Ramos, with Real Madrid in 2016, 2017 and 2018
- Most participated in the final as captain: **4**
  - (West Germany) Franz Beckenbauer with Bayern Munich in 1974 (2) (Note: The 1974 European Cup final was replayed due to ending 1–1 in the first game. This is the only European Cup/Champions League final to have been replayed.), 1975 and 1976
  - (Italy) Franco Baresi with Milan in 1989, 1990, 1993 and 1995
- Six other players participated in the final as captain on three occasions:
  - (Spain) Paco Gento with Real Madrid in 1962, 1964 and 1966
  - (Portugal) Mário Coluna with Benfica in 1963, 1965 and 1968
  - (Italy) Armando Picchi with Inter Milan in 1964, 1965 and 1967
  - (Italy) Paolo Maldini with Milan in 2003, 2005 and 2007
  - (Spain) Sergio Ramos with Real Madrid in 2016, 2017 and 2018
  - (England) Jordan Henderson with Liverpool in 2018, 2019 and 2022
- Oldest captain to lift the trophy: **38 years and 331 days** – (Italy) Paolo Maldini, with Milan, 2007 final
- Youngest captain to lift the trophy: **24 years and 223 days** – (France) Didier Deschamps, with Marseille, 1993 final
- Oldest player to start as captain: **40 years and 212 days** – (Scotland) David Weir, with Rangers v Bursaspor, 7 December 2010
- Youngest player to start as captain: **18 years and 221 days** – (Portugal) Rúben Neves, with Porto v Maccabi Tel Aviv, 20 October 2015
- Youngest player to start as captain in the Champions League knockout phase: **19 years and 186 days** – (Netherlands) Matthijs de Ligt, with Ajax v Real Madrid, 13 February 2019

==== Trivia ====
- Most finals reached with the most different clubs: **3** (Note: Fernando Morientes reached the final with Real Madrid in 1998, 2000 and 2002 and with Monaco in 2004, and in January 2005 he moved to Liverpool, who won the title that season, but because he was not registered with the team due to his participation with Real Madrid in the group stage, he is not included in this list.) (Note: Emre Can reached the final with Liverpool in 2018 and with Borussia Dortmund in 2024, and in 2012–13 he played for Bayern Munich, who won the title that season, moving from Bayern Munich II, and because he did not participate in any Champions League match that season, he was not included in the list.)
  - (France) Didier Deschamps with Marseille in 1993, with Juventus in 1996, 1997 and 1998, and with Valencia in 2001
  - (Netherlands) Clarence Seedorf with Ajax in 1995, with Real Madrid in 1998, and with Milan in 2003, 2005 and 2007
  - (France) Patrice Evra with Monaco in 2004, with Manchester United in 2008, 2009 and 2011, and with Juventus in 2015
  - (Spain) Thiago with Barcelona in 2011, with Bayern Munich in 2020, and with Liverpool in 2022
  - (France) Lucas Hernandez with Atlético Madrid in 2014 and 2016, with Bayern Munich in 2020, and with Paris Saint Germain in 2025 and 2026
  - (Spain) Kepa Arrizabalaga with Chelsea in 2021, with Real Madrid in 2024, and with Arsenal in 2026
- Most quarter-final appearances with different clubs: **5** – (Sweden) Zlatan Ibrahimović; with Ajax, Juventus, Barcelona, Milan and Paris Saint-Germain
- Most finals lost: **4** – (France) Patrice Evra; in 2004 with Monaco, in 2009 and 2011 with Manchester United, and in 2015 with Juventus, with his side losing to Barcelona on each of the latter three occasions. He is the only player to lose the final with three clubs
- (France) Zinedine Zidane (with Bordeaux in the 1996 UEFA Cup final and with Juventus in the 1997 UEFA Champions League final), (Denmark) Christian Eriksen (with Tottenham Hotspur in the 2019 UEFA Champions League final and with Inter Milan in the 2020 UEFA Europa League final) and (Uruguay) Edinson Cavani (with Paris Saint-Germain in the 2020 UEFA Champions League final and with Manchester United in the 2021 UEFA Europa League final) are the only players to lose two consecutive European club finals in two different competitions.
- Two players have scored against their former clubs in the final match:
  - (France) Kingsley Coman, for Bayern Munich v Paris Saint-Germain, 2020 final
  - (Morocco) Achraf Hakimi, for Paris Saint-Germain v Inter Milan, 2025 final
- (Italy) Moise Kean (born 28 February 2000) was the first player born in the 2000s to play in the Champions League, playing in Juventus's match against Sevilla on 22 November 2016.
- (England) Jadon Sancho (born 25 March 2000) was the first player born in the 2000s to score in the Champions League, playing in Borussia Dortmund's match against Atlético Madrid on 24 October 2018.
- (France) Han-Noah Massengo (born 7 July 2001) was the first player born in the 21st century to play in the Champions League, playing in Monaco's match against Club Brugge on 6 November 2018.
- (Brazil) Rodrygo (born 9 January 2001) was the first player born in the 21st century to score in the Champions League, doing so for Real Madrid against Galatasaray on 6 November 2019.
- (Germany) Filip Pavić (born 19 January 2010) was the first player born in the 2010s to play in the Champions League, playing in Bayern Munich's match against Atalanta on 18 March 2026.
- Five players have lost three finals with their clubs, and never won the tournament:
  - (Portugal) Raul Machado (1963, 1965 and 1968 with Benfica)
  - (Italy) Mark Iuliano (1997, 1998 and 2003 with Juventus)
  - (Uruguay) Paolo Montero (1997, 1998 and 2003 with Juventus)
  - (Italy) Gianluigi Buffon (2003, 2015 and 2017 with Juventus)
  - (Germany) Hans-Jörg Butt (2002, 2010 and 2012 with Leverkusen and Bayern)

== Managers ==
=== All-time managerial appearances ===
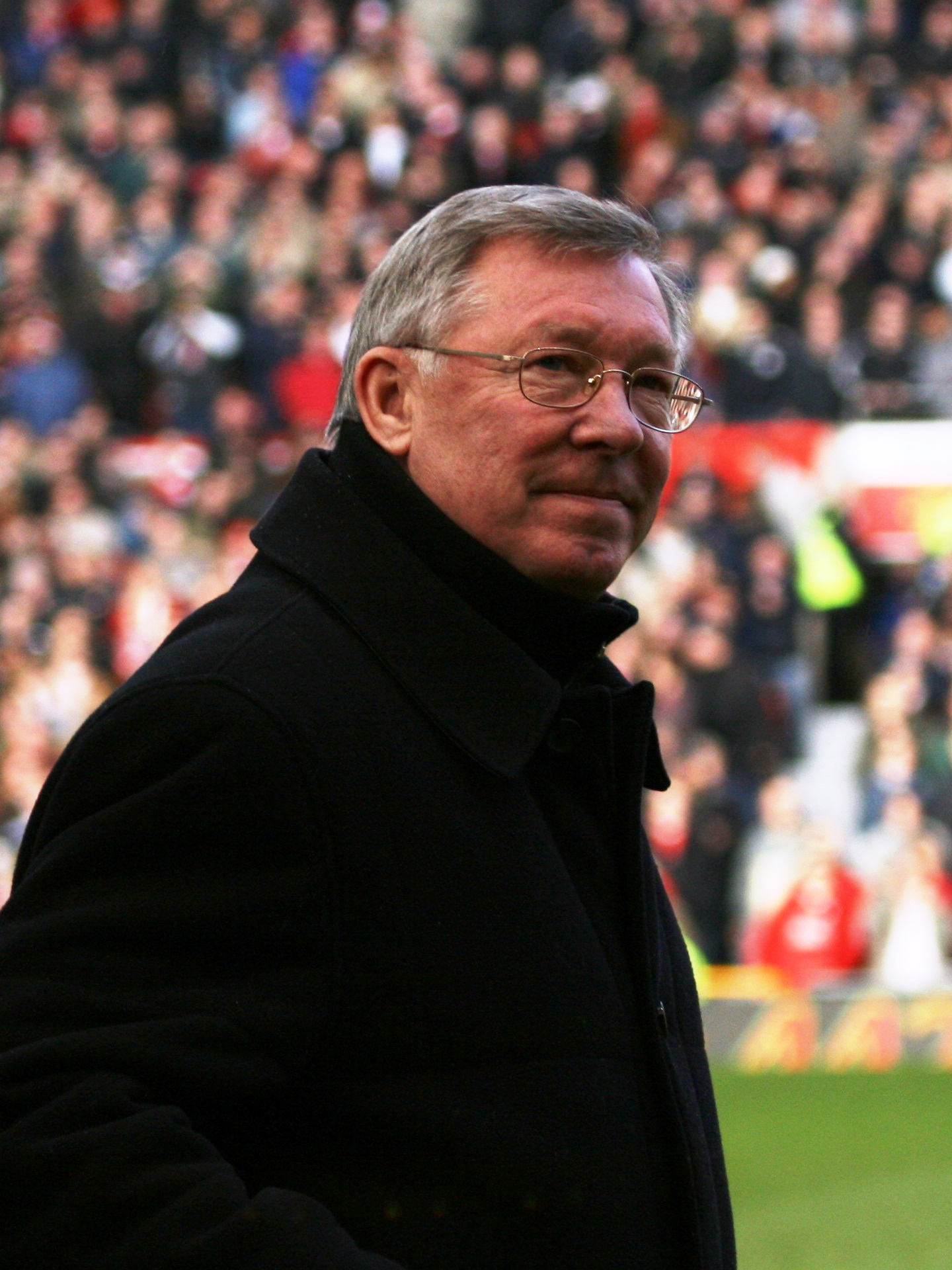
Alex Ferguson has made the most appearances in the competition as manager for one club, with 190 for Manchester United.

As of 4 November 2026

The table below does not include the qualification stage of the competition. Managers taking part in the 2026–27 UEFA Champions League are highlighted in bold.

Rank	Manager	Nation	Matches	Years	Club(s) (matches)
1	Carlo Ancelotti	Italy	218 (Note: Ancelotti also managed six qualifying matches.)	1997–2025	Parma (6); Juventus (10); Milan (73); Chelsea (18); Paris Saint-Germain (10); Real Madrid (77); Bayern Munich (12); Napoli (12)
2	Alex Ferguson	Scotland	202 (Note: Ferguson also managed twelve qualifying matches. There are included 12 European Cup matches with Aberdeen.)	1980–2013	Aberdeen (12); Manchester United (190)
3	Pep Guardiola	Spain	191 (Note: Guardiola also managed four qualifying matches. He served a one-match ban with Manchester City vs Lyon in September 2018.)	2008–2026	Barcelona (50); Bayern Munich (36); Manchester City (105)
4	Arsène Wenger	France	190 (Note: Wenger also managed eighteen qualifying matches. There are included 6 European Cup matches with Monaco. Moreover, he was handed a two-match ban with Arsenal vs Borussia Dortmund and Olympiacos in September 2011, followed by a three-match suspension vs Montpellier, Olympiacos and Schalke 04 in September and October 2012.)	1988–2017	Monaco (13); Arsenal (177)
5	**José Mourinho**	Portugal	158 (Note: Mourinho also managed eight qualifying matches with Fenerbahçe. He served a two-match ban with Chelsea vs Bayern Munich in April 2005, followed by a three-match suspension with Real Madrid vs Barcelona in May 2011, then against Dinamo Zagreb and Ajax in September 2011, and later another suspension with Benfica against Real Madrid in February 2026.)	2001–	Porto (17); Chelsea (57); Inter Milan (21); **Real Madrid** (37); Manchester United (14); Tottenham Hotspur (4); Benfica (8)
6	**Diego Simeone**	Argentina	131 (Note: Simeone had missed 3 matches due to suspensions in September 2014 vs Olympiacos, September 2018 vs Monaco, and September 2025 vs Eintracht Frankfurt.)	2013–	**Atlético Madrid** (131)
7	Mircea Lucescu	Romania	115 (Note: Lucescu also managed 37 qualifying matches.)	1998–2022	Inter Milan (3); Galatasaray (26); Beşiktaş (6); Shakhtar Donetsk (68); Dynamo Kyiv (12)
8	**Massimiliano Allegri**	Italy	104 (Note: Allegri also managed two qualifying matches.)	2010–	Milan (32); Juventus (68); **Napoli** (4)
9	Jürgen Klopp	Germany	100 (Note: Klopp also managed two qualifying matches. He had missed 2 matches because of two-game touchline ban with Dortmund vs Marseille and Arsenal in October 2013.)	2011–2023	Borussia Dortmund (35); Liverpool (65)
10	Ottmar Hitzfeld	Germany	97 (Note: Hitzfeld also managed four qualifying matches. There are included 2 European Cup matches with Grasshopper.)	1990–2004	Grasshopper (2); Borussia Dortmund (19); Bayern Munich (76)

=== Final and winning records ===
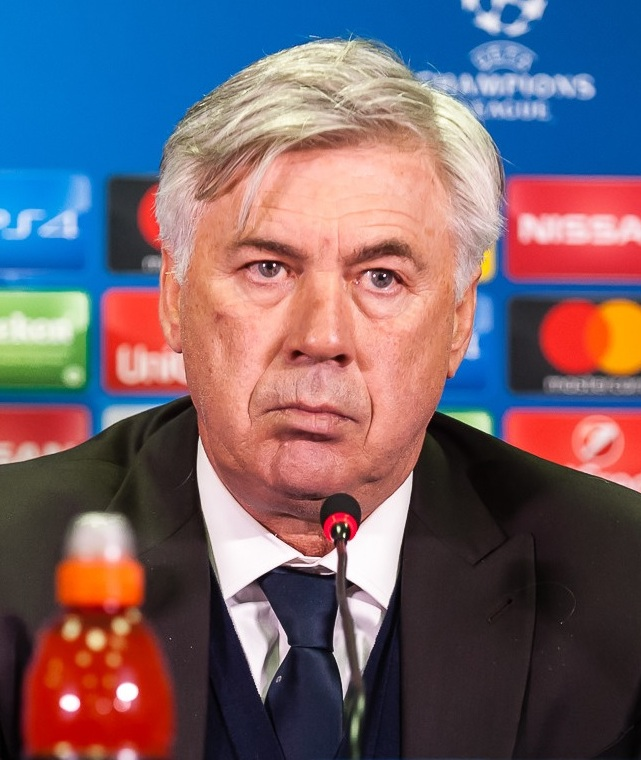
Carlo Ancelotti is the only manager to both win five UEFA Champions League titles and to reach the final six times.

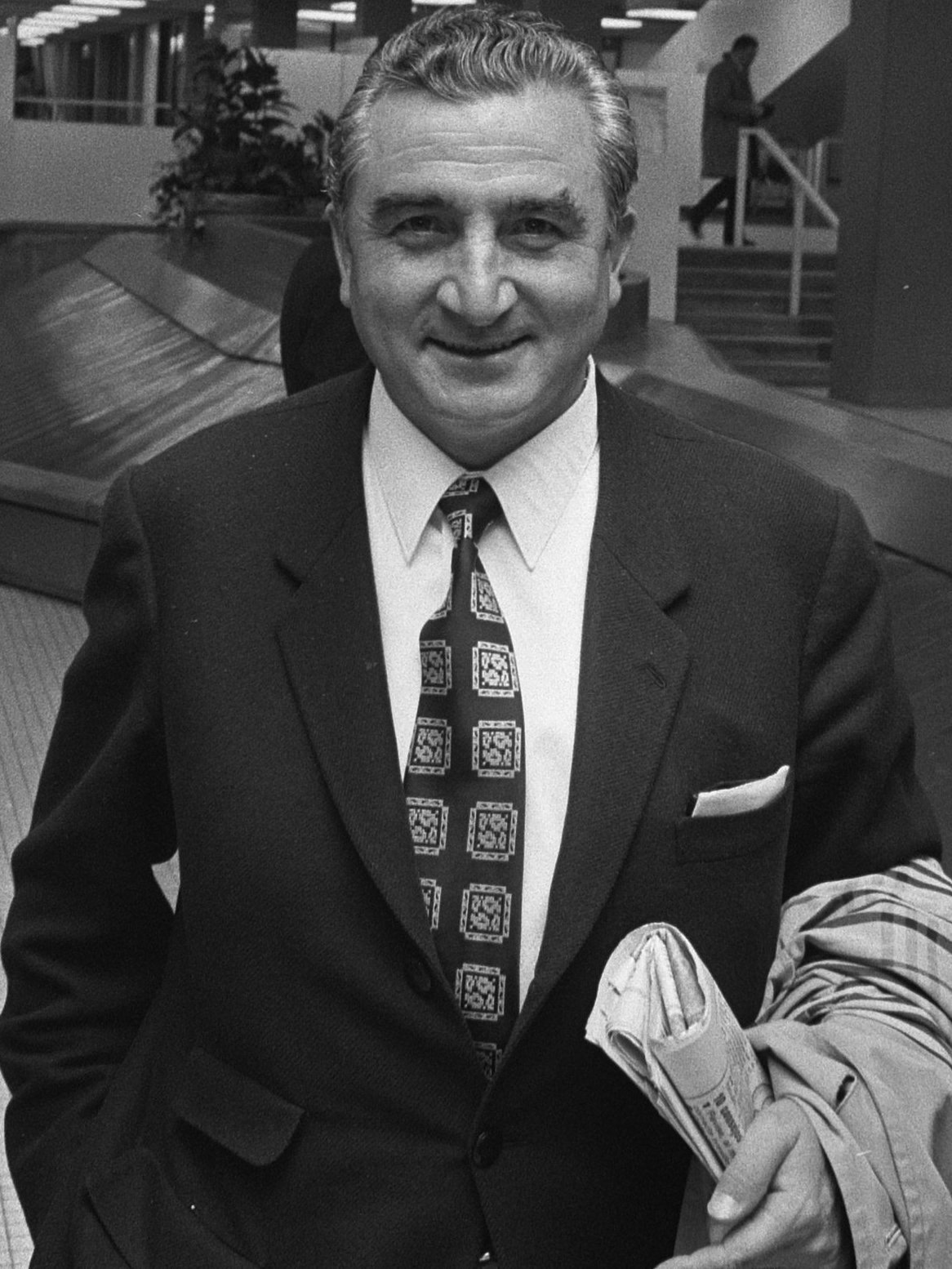
Miguel Muñoz was the first individual to have won the title as a player and as a manager.

- Most titles won as manager: **5** – (Italy) Carlo Ancelotti; doing so in 2002–03 and 2006–07 with Milan, and in 2013–14, 2021–22 and 2023–24 with Real Madrid
- Four other managers have won the competition three times:
  - (England) Bob Paisley in 1976–77, 1977–78 and 1980–81, all with Liverpool
  - (France) Zinedine Zidane in 2015–16, 2016–17 and 2017–18, all with Real Madrid
  - (Spain) Pep Guardiola in 2008–09, 2010–11, with Barcelona and 2022–23, with Manchester City
  - (Spain) Luis Enrique in 2014–15 with Barcelona, and 2024–25, 2025–26, with Paris Saint-Germain
- Most consecutive seasons won as manager: **3** – (France) Zinedine Zidane, 2016–2018
- Most consecutive debut seasons won as manager: **3** – (France) Zinedine Zidane, 2016–2018
- The following five managers have also won the tournament two times in their first two appearances:
  - (Spain) José Villalonga (1955–56 and 1956–57, both with Real Madrid)
  - (Hungary) Béla Guttmann (1960–61 and 1961–62, both with Benfica)
  - (Germany) Dettmar Cramer (1974–75 and 1975–76, both with Bayern Munich)
  - (England) Bob Paisley (1976–77 and 1977–78, both with Liverpool)
  - (Italy) Arrigo Sacchi (1988–89 and 1989–90, both with Milan)
- Most finalists as manager: **6** – (Italy) Carlo Ancelotti; 2003, 2005, 2007, 2014, 2022 and 2024
- Five other managers have managed four finalists:
  - (Spain) Miguel Muñoz; 1960, 1962, 1964 and 1966
  - (Italy) Marcello Lippi; 1996, 1997, 1998 and 2003
  - (Scotland) Alex Ferguson; 1999, 2008, 2009 and 2011
  - (Germany) Jürgen Klopp; 2013, 2018, 2019 and 2022
  - (Spain) Pep Guardiola; 2009, 2011, 2021 and 2023
- Most lost finals: **3**
  - (Italy) Marcello Lippi; 1997, 1998 and 2003
  - (Germany) Jürgen Klopp; 2013, 2018 and 2022
- Seven individuals have won the European Cup/Champions League as a player then later as a manager, four of them with the same club:
  - (Spain) Miguel Muñoz of Real Madrid won as a player in 1955–56 and 1956–57, and as a manager in 1959–60 and 1965–66.
  - (Italy) Carlo Ancelotti won as a player in 1988–89 and 1989–90, and as a manager in 2002–03 and 2006–07 with Milan, then as a manager in 2013–14, 2021–22 and 2023–24 with Real Madrid.
  - (Spain) Pep Guardiola won as a player in 1991–92, and as a manager in 2008–09 and 2010–11 with Barcelona, then as a manager in 2022–23 with Manchester City.
  - (Italy) Giovanni Trapattoni won as a player in 1962–63 and 1968–69, both with Milan, and as a manager in 1984–85 with Juventus.
  - (Netherlands) Johan Cruyff won as a player in 1970–71, 1971–72 and 1972–73, all with Ajax, and as a manager in 1991–92 with Barcelona.
  - (Netherlands) Frank Rijkaard won as a player in 1988–89 and 1989–90, both with Milan, in 1994–95 with Ajax, and as a manager in 2005–06 with Barcelona.
  - (France) Zinedine Zidane of Real Madrid won as player in 2001–02, and as a manager in 2015–16, 2016–17 and 2017–18.
- Eight other individuals have appeared in the final as a player then later as a manager, though did not win while in one or either of the roles:
  - (Spain) Vicente del Bosque of Real Madrid lost as a player in 1981, but won as a manager in 2000 and 2002.
  - (Italy) Fabio Capello lost as a player in 1973 with Juventus and as a manager in 1993 and 1995, but won as a manager in 1994, all as a manager with Milan.
  - (France) Didier Deschamps won as a player in 1993 with Marseille and 1996 with Juventus and lost with Juventus in 1997 and 1998 (also lost in 2001 with Valencia as an unused substitute), and lost as a manager with Monaco in 2004.
  - (Germany) Jupp Heynckes lost as a player in 1977 with Borussia Mönchengladbach, but won as a manager in 1998 with Real Madrid and in 2013 with Bayern Munich, and lost as a manager in 2012 with Bayern Munich.
  - (Romania) Anghel Iordănescu of Steaua București won as a player in 1986, but lost as a manager in 1989.
  - (Sweden) Nils Liedholm lost as a player in 1958 with Milan and as a manager with Roma in 1984.
  - (Hungary) Ferenc Puskás won as a player in 1960 (also won in 1959 and 1966 as a team member not selected for the final) and lost in 1962 and 1964, all with Real Madrid, and lost as a manager in 1971 with Panathinaikos.
  - (Germany) Hansi Flick of Bayern Munich lost as a player in 1987, but won as a manager in 2020.
- Seven managers have won the title with two clubs:
  - (Austria) Ernst Happel did so with Feyenoord in 1969–70, and with Hamburger SV in 1982–83.
  - (Germany) Ottmar Hitzfeld did so with Borussia Dortmund in 1996–97, and with Bayern Munich in 2000–01, and is the only manager to have won the trophy with two different clubs from the same domestic league.
  - (Portugal) José Mourinho did so with Porto in 2003–04, and with Inter Milan in 2009–10.
  - (Germany) Jupp Heynckes did so with Real Madrid in 1997–98, and with Bayern Munich in 2012–13.
  - (Italy) Carlo Ancelotti did so with Milan in 2002–03 and 2006–07, and with Real Madrid in 2013–14, 2021–22 and 2023–24.
  - (Spain) Pep Guardiola did so with Barcelona in 2008–09 and 2010–11, and with Manchester City in 2022–23.
  - (Spain) Luis Enrique did so with Barcelona in 2014–15, and with Paris Saint-Germain in 2024–25 and 2025–26.
    - Pep Guardiola and Luis Enrique are also the only managers to win a continental treble with two different clubs.
- (Germany) Thomas Tuchel is the only manager to reach the final in consecutive seasons with two clubs (Paris Saint-Germain in 2020 and Chelsea in 2021).
- Italian and Spanish managers have won the competition a record **13 times** each.
- Five clubs, on nine total occasions, changed their manager during the season and went on to win the tournament:
  - (Spain) Real Madrid replaced Manuel Fleitas Solich with Miguel Muñoz in 1959–60, replaced John Toshack with Vicente del Bosque in 1999–2000, and replaced Rafael Benítez with Zinedine Zidane in 2015–16
  - (Germany) Bayern Munich replaced Udo Lattek with Dettmar Cramer in 1974–75, and replaced Niko Kovač with Hansi Flick in 2019–20
  - (England) Aston Villa replaced Ron Saunders with Tony Barton in 1981–82
  - (France) Marseille replaced Jean Fernandez with Raymond Goethals in 1992–93
  - (England) Chelsea replaced André Villas-Boas with Roberto Di Matteo in 2011–12, and replaced Frank Lampard with Thomas Tuchel in 2020–21

=== Most wins as both player and manager ===
This table lists the individuals who have won the competition both as a player and a manager, in order of frequency.

Nationality	Name	Wins as player	Wins as manager	Total
Italy	Carlo Ancelotti	2	5	7
Spain	Miguel Muñoz	3	2	5
Netherlands	Johan Cruyff	3	1	4
Netherlands	Frank Rijkaard	3	1	4
Spain	Pep Guardiola	1	3	4
France	Zinedine Zidane	1	3	4
Italy	Giovanni Trapattoni	2	1	3

=== Winning other trophies ===
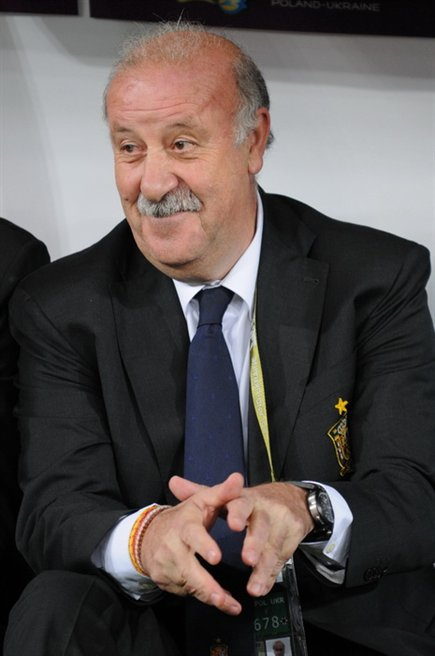
Vicente del Bosque is the only manager to win the Champions League, the FIFA World Cup and the European Championship.

- Only one manager has won the Champions League, the World Cup and the European Championship:
  - Vicente del Bosque won the Champions League with Real Madrid in 2000 and 2002, the World Cup in 2010 and the European Championship in 2012 with Spain
- One other manager has won the Champions League as well as the World Cup:
  - Marcello Lippi won the Champions League with Juventus in 1996 and the World Cup in 2006 with Italy. In addition, he won the 2013 AFC Champions League with Guangzhou Evergrande, to become the only manager to win both the AFC and UEFA Champions League.
- Two other managers have won the European Cup as well as the European Championship:
  - José Villalonga won the European Cup with Real Madrid in 1956 and 1957 and the European Championship in 1964 with Spain
  - Rinus Michels won the European Cup with Ajax in 1971 and the European Championship in 1988 with Netherlands
- Two managers have won the Cup Winners' Cup and the European Cup with the same club in two consecutive seasons:
  - (Italy) Nereo Rocco of Milan won the Cup Winners' Cup in 1968 and the European Cup in 1969
  - (Italy) Giovanni Trapattoni of Juventus won the Cup Winners' Cup in 1984 and the European Cup in 1985
- Three managers have won the UEFA Cup and the European Cup in two consecutive seasons, two of them with the same club:
  - (England) Bob Paisley won the UEFA Cup in 1976 and the European Cup in 1977, both with Liverpool
  - (Portugal) José Mourinho won the UEFA Cup in 2003 and the Champions League in 2004, both with Porto
  - (Spain) Rafael Benítez won the UEFA Cup in 2004 with Valencia and the Champions League in 2005 with Liverpool
- (Spain) Rafael Benítez is the only manager to have won the FIFA Club World Cup, the UEFA Cup, and the UEFA Champions League.
- Two managers have won the Cup Winners' Cup, the UEFA Cup and the European Cup:
  - (Italy) Giovanni Trapattoni of Juventus won the UEFA Cup in 1977 and 1993, the Cup Winners' Cup in 1984 and the European Cup in 1985. He also won the UEFA Cup in 1991 with Inter Milan.
  - (Germany) Udo Lattek won the European Cup in 1974 with Bayern Munich, the UEFA Cup in 1979 with Borussia Mönchengladbach and the Cup Winners' Cup in 1982 with Barcelona.
- Only one manager won the UEFA Cup/UEFA Europa League, the UEFA Champions League and the UEFA Europa Conference League:
  - (Portugal) José Mourinho won the UEFA Cup in 2003 with Porto, the UEFA Champions League with the same club in the following year, then the UEFA Champions League again with Inter Milan in 2010, the UEFA Europa League with Manchester United in 2017 and the UEFA Europa Conference League with Roma in 2022.

=== Oldest and youngest ===
- Youngest manager: **27 years, 349 days** – (England) Bob Houghton, for Malmö v Magdeburg, 17 September 1975
- Youngest manager in the Champions League era: **31 years, 58 days** – (Germany) Julian Nagelsmann, for TSG Hoffenheim v Shakhtar Donetsk, 19 September 2018
- Oldest manager: **76 years, 132 days** – (Romania) Mircea Lucescu, for Dynamo Kyiv v Benfica, 8 December 2021
- Youngest manager to win a match: **27 years, 349 days** – (England) Bob Houghton, for Malmö v Magdeburg, 17 September 1975
- Youngest manager to win a match in the Champions League era: **32 years, 56 days** – (Germany) Julian Nagelsmann, for RB Leipzig v Benfica, 17 September 2019
- Oldest manager to win a match: **75 years, 132 days** – (Romania) Mircea Lucescu, for Dynamo Kyiv v Ferencváros, 8 December 2020
- Youngest manager to win a title: **36 years, 184 days** – (Spain) José Villalonga, with Real Madrid, 13 June 1956
- Youngest manager to win a title in the Champions League era: **38 years, 129 days** – (Spain) Pep Guardiola, with Barcelona, 27 May 2009
- Oldest manager to win a title: **71 years, 231 days** – (Belgium) Raymond Goethals for Marseille, 26 May 1993

=== Other records ===
- Most matches won as manager: **124** – (Italy) Carlo Ancelotti, 1997–2025 (Note: Excluding five wins in qualifying rounds and the 2003 final win on penalties.)
- The only other managers to win more than 100 matches:
  - (Spain) Pep Guardiola, 2008–2026, **117** (Note: Excluding three wins in qualifying rounds with Barcelona and Manchester City.)
  - (Scotland) Alex Ferguson, 1980–2013, **107** (Note: Excluding eight wins in qualifying rounds and 2008 final win on penalties. He won five European Cup matches with Aberdeen and 102 UEFA Champions League matches with Manchester United.)
- Most appearances for a single club: **190** – (Scotland) Alex Ferguson, for Manchester United
- Most matches won for a single club: **102** – (Scotland) Alex Ferguson, for Manchester United
- Most matches won in the knockout phase: **44** – (Spain) Pep Guardiola
- Most consecutive knockout tie wins: **12** – (France) Zinedine Zidane, 2016–2018
- Most consecutive matches won: **12**
  - (Germany) Jupp Heynckes, with Bayern Munich, 2013–2018 (Note: Heynckes' winning run started on 2 April 2013 by beating Juventus 2–0 in the quarter-finals, then winning the second leg, two semi-final matches, and the 2013 final against Borussia Dortmund, before retiring. After Bayern's two group stage matches with Carlo Ancelotti in the 2017–18 season, Heynckes came out of retirement, winning the remaining four group stage matches, two round of 16 matches, then reaching the 12th successive win on 3 April 2018 by defeating Sevilla 2–1 in the first leg of quarter-finals; the run ended with a goalless draw against Sevilla in the second leg.)
  - (Germany) Hansi Flick, with Bayern Munich, 2019–2020 (Note: Flick's winning run started on 6 November 2019 by beating Olympiacos 2–0 in the fourth group stage match, then winning the next two group matches, two round of 16 matches, the single-legged quarter-final and semi-final matches, and the 2020 final against Paris Saint-Germain. The run continued in the 2020–21 season as Bayern won four group matches, with Flick reaching the 12th successive win on 25 November 2020 by defeating Red Bull Salzburg 3–1; the run ended with a 1–1 draw against Atlético Madrid in the fifth group stage match.)
- Most consecutive matches won in the group stage: **14**
  - (Netherlands) Louis van Gaal, 1999–2009 (Note: van Gaal's winning run started with Barcelona on 8 December 1999 by beating Sparta Prague 5–0 in the 1999–2000 season, then winning another four matches in the same season, and eight matches in two group stages in the 2002–03 season, before his last win with Bayern Munich 3–0 against Maccabi Haifa in the 2009–10 season.)
  - (Germany) Julian Nagelsmann, 2020–2022 (Note: Nagelsmann's winning run started with RB Leipzig on 2 December 2020 by beating İstanbul Başakşehir 4–3 in the 2020–21 season, then another victory in the same season, before winning twelve matches with Bayern Munich in the 2021–22 and 2022–23 seasons.)
- Most consecutive matches without defeat: **26**
  - (Spain) Pep Guardiola, with Manchester City, 2022–2024
- Most consecutive matches with home wins: **15**
  - (Spain) Luis Enrique, with Barcelona, 2014–2017
- Most consecutive matches without home defeat: **35**
  - (Spain) Pep Guardiola, with Manchester City, 2018–2025
- Most consecutive matches with away wins: **7**
  - (Netherlands) Louis van Gaal, with Ajax, 1995–1997
  - (Germany) Jupp Heynckes, with Bayern Munich, 2013–2014
- Most consecutive matches without away defeat: **16**
  - (Scotland) Alex Ferguson, with Manchester United, 2007–2010
- Most matches won by a manager against a single opponent: **8**
  - (Spain) Pep Guardiola, with Barcelona, Bayern Munich and Manchester City, against Shakhtar Donetsk in 12 games; in addition to a win in the 2009 UEFA Super Cup.
  - (Italy) Carlo Ancelotti, with Milan, Real Madrid and Napoli, against Liverpool in 12 games; including two finals in 2007 and 2022.
- Most finals reached by a manager with the most different clubs: **3** – (Austria) Ernst Happel; with Feyenoord in 1970, Club Brugge in 1978 and Hamburger SV in 1983
- Most semi-finals reached by a manager with the most different clubs: **4** – (Portugal) José Mourinho; with Porto in 2003–04, with Chelsea in 2004–05, 2006–07 and 2013–14, with Inter Milan in 2009–10 and with Real Madrid in 2010–11, 2011–12 and 2012–13
- Most appearances by a manager with different clubs: **8** – (Italy) Carlo Ancelotti; Parma, Juventus, Milan, Chelsea, Paris Saint-Germain, Real Madrid, Bayern Munich and Napoli
- Most consecutive final appearances: **3**
  - (Italy) Fabio Capello, 1993–1995
  - (Italy) Marcello Lippi, 1996–1998
  - (France) Zinedine Zidane, 2016–2018; the only manager to have won all of them
- Two non-European coaches won the European Cup twice:
  - (Argentina) Luis Carniglia with Real Madrid (1958 and 1959)
  - (Argentina) Helenio Herrera with Inter Milan (1964 and 1965)
- Six non-European coaches lost their final matches:
  - (Chile) Fernando Riera with Benfica (1963)
  - (Brazil) Otto Glória with Benfica (1968)
  - (Argentina) Juan Carlos Lorenzo with Atlético Madrid (1974)
  - (Argentina) Héctor Cúper with Valencia (2000 and 2001)
  - (Argentina) Diego Simeone with Atlético Madrid (2014 and 2016)
  - (Argentina) Mauricio Pochettino with Tottenham Hotspur (2019)
- In five finals, two coaches from the same nation were faced:
  - England: Brian Clough with Nottingham Forest against Bob Houghton with Malmö FF (1979)
  - Italy: Carlo Ancelotti with Milan against Marcello Lippi with Juventus (2003)
  - Germany: Jupp Heynckes with Bayern Munich against Jürgen Klopp with Borussia Dortmund (2013)
  - Germany: Hansi Flick with Bayern Munich against Thomas Tuchel with Paris Saint-Germain (2020)
  - Spain: Mikel Arteta with Arsenal against Luis Enrique with Paris Saint-Germain (2026)
- In 2019–20, three German managers reached the semi-finals (Hansi Flick with Bayern Munich, Julian Nagelsmann with RB Leipzig and Thomas Tuchel with Paris Saint-Germain), the most by any single nationality to reach the last four in the competition's history. This was matched in 2022–23 when three Italian managers reached the last four (Carlo Ancelotti with Real Madrid, Simone Inzaghi with Inter Milan and Stefano Pioli with Milan).
- There have been four occasions where a record four managers from the same nationality reached the quarter-finals:
  - Four German managers (including East and West Germany) in 1976–77 (Dettmar Cramer with Bayern Munich, Walter Fritzsch with Dynamo Dresden, Friedhelm Konietzka with Zürich and Udo Lattek with Borussia Mönchengladbach)
  - Four German managers in 2020–21 (Hansi Flick with Bayern Munich, Jürgen Klopp with Liverpool, Edin Terzić with Borussia Dortmund and Thomas Tuchel with Chelsea)
  - Four Italian managers in 2022–23 (Carlo Ancelotti with Real Madrid, Simone Inzaghi with Inter Milan, Stefano Pioli with Milan and Luciano Spalletti with Napoli)
  - Four Spanish managers in 2023–24 (Mikel Arteta with Arsenal, Pep Guardiola with Manchester City, Luis Enrique with Paris Saint-Germain and Xavi with Barcelona)

== Referees ==
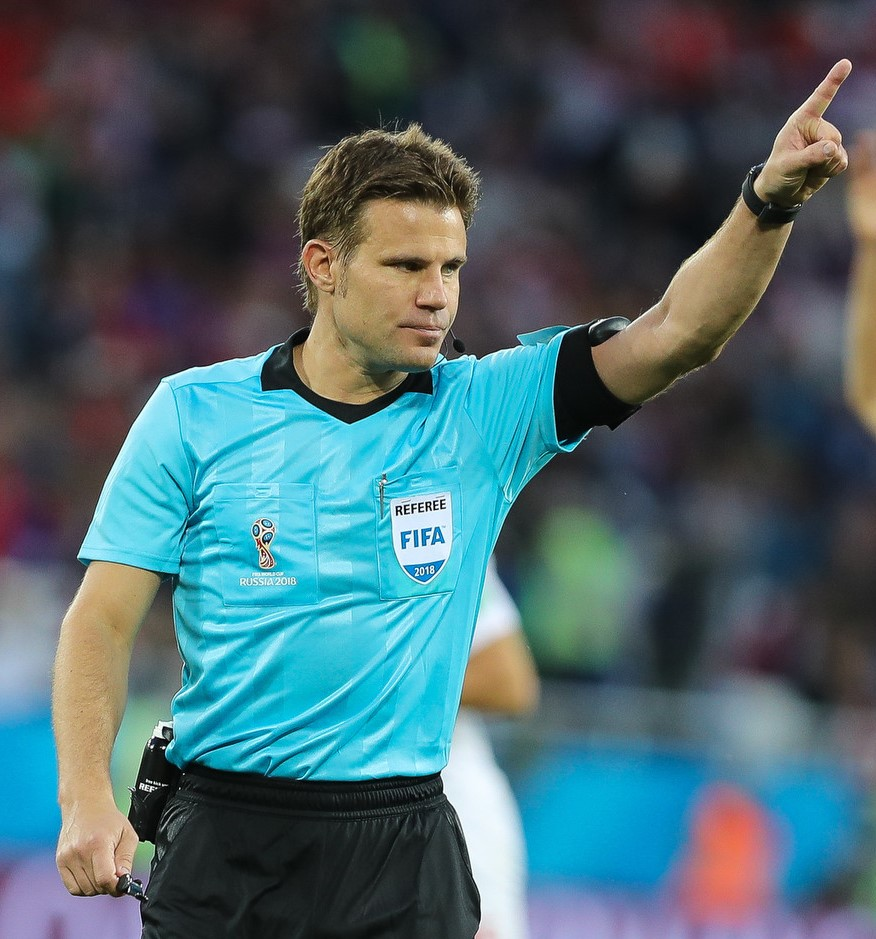
Felix Brych has officiated the most matches in the competition.

- Most appearances as a referee: 69 – (Germany) Felix Brych, 2008–2021
- Most appearances in a season as a referee: 9 – (Netherlands) Björn Kuipers, 2020–21
- Four referees have officiated two finals:
  - (Netherlands) Leo Horn in 1957 and 1962
  - (Switzerland) Gottfried Dienst in 1961 and 1965
  - (Italy) Concetto Lo Bello in 1968 and 1970
  - (Hungary) Károly Palotai in 1976 and 1981
- (Switzerland) Gottfried Dienst is the only referee to have officiated the final of the European Cup/Champions League, the FIFA World Cup and the UEFA European Championship, with the 1961 and 1965 European Cup final, and in the 1966 FIFA World Cup final and UEFA Euro 1968 final.
- The following referees have additionally officiated the final of both the European Cup/Champions League and the FIFA World Cup:
  - (England) Jack Taylor, with the 1971 European Cup final, and in the 1974 FIFA World Cup final.
  - (Hungary) Sándor Puhl, with the 1997 UEFA Champions League final, and in the 1994 FIFA World Cup final.
  - (Italy) Pierluigi Collina, with the 1999 UEFA Champions League final, and in the 2002 FIFA World Cup final.
  - (England) Howard Webb, with the 2010 UEFA Champions League final, and in the 2010 FIFA World Cup final.
  - (Italy) Nicola Rizzoli, with the 2013 UEFA Champions League final, and in the 2014 FIFA World Cup final.
  - (Poland) Szymon Marciniak, with the 2023 UEFA Champions League final, and in the 2022 FIFA World Cup final.
- The following referees have additionally officiated the final of both the European Cup/Champions League and the UEFA European Championship:
  - (England) Arthur Edward Ellis, with the 1956 European Cup final, and in the 1960 European Nations' Cup final.
  - (England) Arthur Holland, with the 1963 European Cup final, and in the 1964 European Nations' Cup final.
  - (Romania) Nicolae Rainea, with the 1983 European Cup final, and in the UEFA Euro 1980 final.
  - (France) Michel Vautrot, with the 1986 European Cup final, and in the UEFA Euro 1988 final.
  - (Germany) Markus Merk, with the 2003 UEFA Champions League final, and in the UEFA Euro 2004 final.
  - (Portugal) Pedro Proença, with the 2012 UEFA Champions League final, and in the UEFA Euro 2012 final.
  - (Netherlands) Björn Kuipers, with the 2014 UEFA Champions League final, and in the UEFA Euro 2020 final.
  - (England) Mark Clattenburg, with the 2016 UEFA Champions League final, and in the UEFA Euro 2016 final.
- (France) Stéphanie Frappart became the first and the only woman to referee a men's UEFA Champions League match, when she officiated a group stage game between Juventus and Dynamo Kyiv on 2 December 2020.

=== Disciplinary ===
As of 7 December 2021

- Most yellow cards: 271 – (Germany) Felix Brych
- Most direct red cards: 12 – (Germany) Markus Merk
- Most penalties awarded: 27 – (Germany) Felix Brych

== Presidents ==
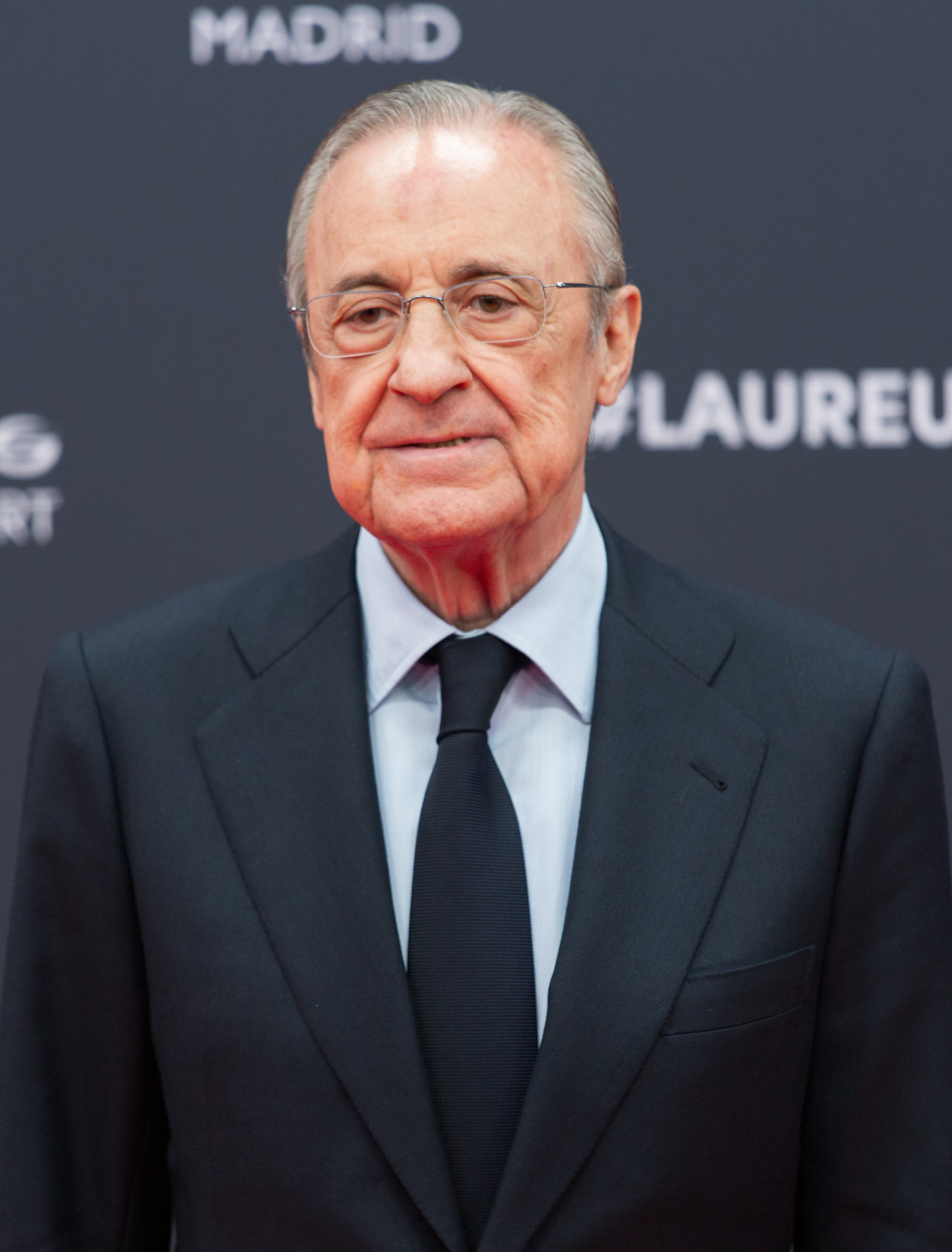
Florentino Pérez is the president whose club has won the most titles with him in charge.

- Florentino Pérez is the president whose club has won the most titles with him in charge, seven Champions League titles with Real Madrid in 2001–02, 2013–14, 2015–16, 2016–17, 2017–18, 2021–22 and 2023–24.
  - Santiago Bernabéu as a president of Real Madrid won six European Cups in 1955–56, 1956–57, 1957–58, 1958–59, 1959–60 and 1965–66.
  - Silvio Berlusconi as a president of Milan won five European Cups in 1988–89, 1989–90, 1993–94, 2002–03 and 2006–07.
- Franco Carraro was the youngest president in charge when his club won the competition, with Milan in 1968–69, aged 29 years and 173 days.
- Florentino Pérez was the oldest president in charge when his club won the competition, with Real Madrid in 2023–24, aged 77 years and 86 days.
- Jaap van Praag and Michael van Praag are the first father and son in the position of president when their club won the competition, Ajax. This team won the Champions League in different periods with these presidents, in 1970–71, 1971–72, 1972–73 and 1994–95.
- Angelo Moratti and Massimo Moratti are the second father and son in the position of president when their club won the competition, Inter Milan. This team won the Champions League in different periods with these presidents, in 1963–64, 1964–65 and 2009–10.

== Attendance ==
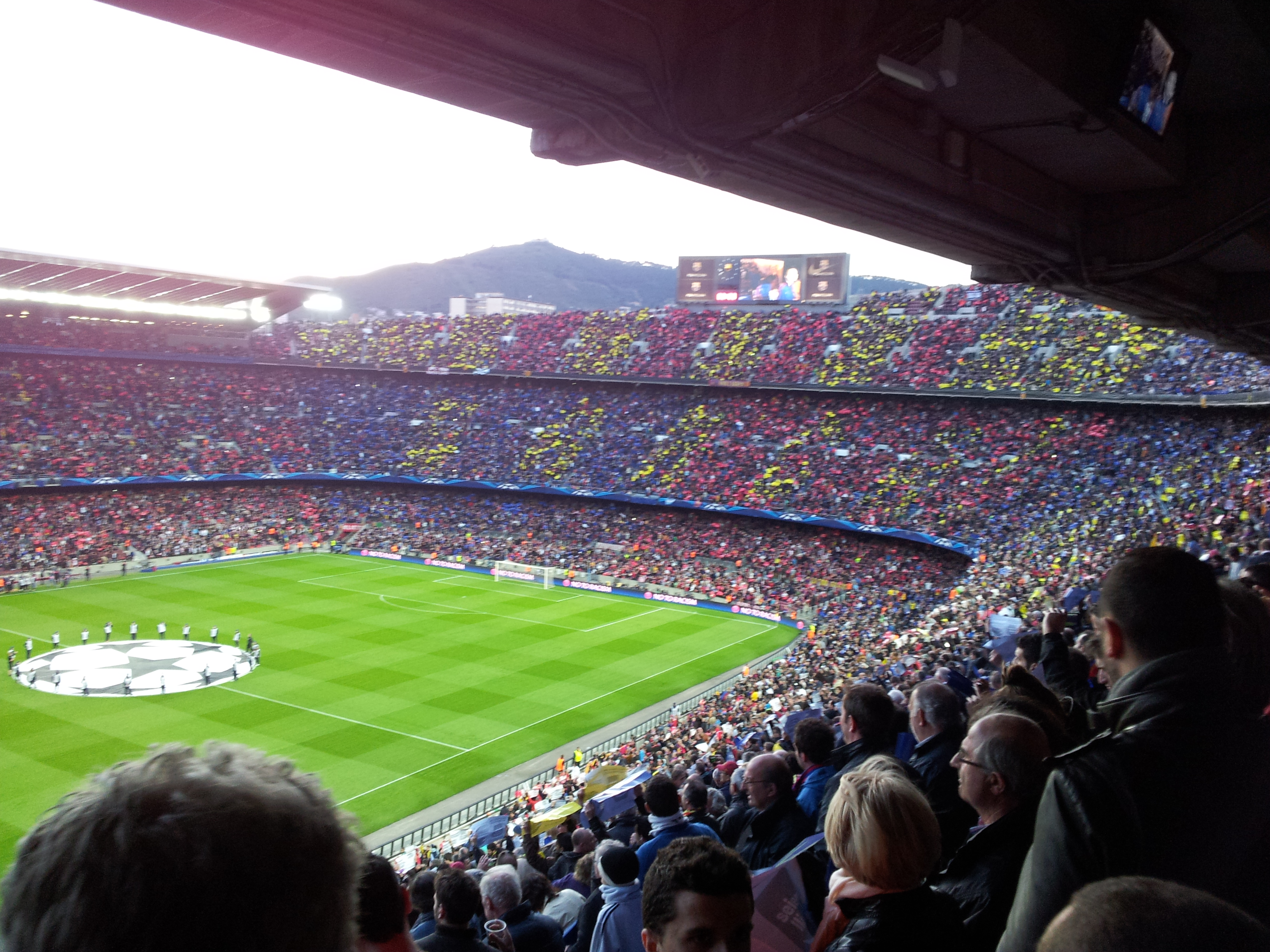
The fans in the Barcelona and Bayern Munich match in the 2012–13 semi-final second leg

- Highest attendance: 135,805 – Celtic v (England) Leeds United, 1969–70 semi-final second leg, 15 April 1970, at Hampden Park in Glasgow, Scotland
- Highest attendance in the Champions League era: 115,500 – Barcelona v (France) Paris Saint-Germain, 1994–95 quarter-final first leg, 1 March 1995, at Camp Nou in Barcelona, Spain
- Highest attendance in the final: 127,621 – (Spain) Real Madrid v (Germany) Eintracht Frankfurt, 1960 final, 18 May 1960, at Hampden Park in Glasgow, Scotland
- Highest attendance in the final in the Champions League era: 90,245 – (England) Manchester United v (Germany) Bayern Munich, 1999 final, 26 May 1999, at Camp Nou in Barcelona, Spain
- Lowest attendance in the final: 0 – (Germany) Bayern Munich v (France) Paris Saint-Germain, 2020 final, 23 August 2020, at Estádio da Luz, Lisbon, Portugal; the match played behind closed doors due to the COVID-19 pandemic. The 2021 final at the Estádio do Dragão in Porto was also played with a reduced attendance of 14,110 due to the pandemic. Aside from these two anomalies, the final with the lowest attendance was the 1961 final between Benfica and Barcelona, played at the Wankdorf Stadium in Bern, Switzerland, in front of a crowd of 26,732, although the replay of the 1974 final at the Heysel Stadium in Brussels was attended by 23,325.

== See also ==
- List of European Cup and UEFA Champions League winning managers
- List of European Cup and UEFA Champions League finals
- European association football club records and statistics
- UEFA Cup and Europa League records and statistics
- UEFA Cup Winners' Cup records and statistics
- UEFA club competition records and statistics
- List of UEFA Cup and Europa League finals
- List of world association football records

== Bibliography ==
- "1. Facts & figures" (PDF). UEFA Champions League Statistics Handbook 2022/23. UEFA. 2023. Archived from the original (PDF) on 22 June 2023.
- "2. Finals" (PDF). UEFA Champions League Statistics Handbook 2022/23. UEFA. 2023b. Archived from the original (PDF) on 22 June 2023.
- "3. All-time records 1955–2023" (PDF). UEFA Champions League Statistics Handbook 2022/23. UEFA. 2023c. Archived from the original (PDF) on 22 June 2023.
