= 2019–20 in German football =

Football in Germany
- Season: 2019–20

Men's football
- Bundesliga: Bayern Munich
- 2. Bundesliga: Arminia Bielefeld
- 3. Liga: Bayern Munich II
- DFB-Pokal: Bayern Munich
- DFL-Supercup: Borussia Dortmund

Women's football
- Frauen-Bundesliga: VfL Wolfsburg
- 2. Frauen-Bundesliga: Werder Bremen
- DFB-Pokal: VfL Wolfsburg

The 2019–20 season was the 110th season of competitive football in Germany.

== Promotion and relegation ==
=== Pre-season ===
League	Promoted to league	Relegated from league
Bundesliga	1. FC Köln; SC Paderborn; Union Berlin	VfB Stuttgart; Hannover 96; 1. FC Nürnberg
2. Bundesliga	VfL Osnabrück; Karlsruher SC; Wehen Wiesbaden	FC Ingolstadt; 1. FC Magdeburg; MSV Duisburg
3. Liga	Chemnitzer FC; Viktoria Köln; Waldhof Mannheim; Bayern Munich II	Energie Cottbus; Sportfreunde Lotte; Fortuna Köln; VfR Aalen
Bundesliga (women)	1. FC Köln; USV Jena	Werder Bremen; Borussia Mönchengladbach
2. Bundesliga (women)	SG Andernach; Arminia Bielefeld; FC Ingolstadt	Hessen Wetzlar; SV Weinberg; SGS Essen II

=== Post-season ===
League	Promoted to league	Relegated from league
Bundesliga	Arminia Bielefeld; VfB Stuttgart	Fortuna Düsseldorf; SC Paderborn
2. Bundesliga	Würzburger Kickers; Eintracht Braunschweig	Wehen Wiesbaden; Dynamo Dresden
3. Liga	VfB Lübeck; Türkgücü München; 1. FC Saarbrücken; SC Verl	Chemnitzer FC; Preußen Münster; Sonnenhof Großaspach; Carl Zeiss Jena
Bundesliga (women)	Werder Bremen; SV Meppen	1. FC Köln; USV Jena
2. Bundesliga (women)	SpVg Berghofen; Borussia Bocholt; RB Leipzig; 1. FFC 08 Niederkirchen; Würzburger Kickers	None (season cancelled)

== National teams ==
=== Germany national football team ===
==== Kits ====
Old Home	Old Away	Old Home alt. 1	Old Home alt. 2	New Home

==== UEFA Euro 2020 qualifying ====
===== UEFA Euro 2020 qualifying Group C =====
Pos	Team	Pld	W	D	L	GF	GA	GD	Pts	Qualification	(Germany)	(Netherlands)	(Northern Ireland)	(Belarus)	(Estonia)
1	Germany	8	7	0	1	30	7	+23	21	Qualify for final tournament	—	2–4	6–1	4–0	8–0
2	Netherlands	8	6	1	1	24	7	+17	19	Qualify for final tournament	2–3	—	3–1	4–0	5–0
3	Northern Ireland	8	4	1	3	9	13	−4	13	Advance to play-offs via Nations League	0–2	0–0	—	2–1	2–0
4	Belarus	8	1	1	6	4	16	−12	4	Advance to play-offs via Nations League	0–2	1–2	0–1	—	0–0
5	Estonia	8	0	1	7	2	26	−24	1		0–3	0–4	1–2	1–2	—

Source: UEFA
Rules for classification: Qualification tiebreakers

===== UEFA Euro 2020 qualifying fixtures and results =====
Win Draw Loss

6 September 2019 UEFA Euro 2020 qualifying	Germany	2–4	Netherlands	Hamburg, Germany
20:45 (20:45 UTC+2)	Gnabry 9'; Kroos 73' (pen.)	Report	F. de Jong 59'; Tah 65' (o.g.); Malen 79'; Wijnaldum 90+1'	Stadium: Volksparkstadion; Attendance: 51,299; Referee: Artur Soares Dias (Portugal)

9 September 2019 UEFA Euro 2020 qualifying	Northern Ireland	0–2	Germany	Belfast, Northern Ireland
20:45 (19:45 UTC+1)		Report	Halstenberg 48'; Gnabry 90+3'	Stadium: Windsor Park; Attendance: 18,104; Referee: Daniele Orsato (Italy)

13 October 2019 UEFA Euro 2020 qualifying	Estonia	0–3	Germany	Tallinn, Estonia
20:45 (21:45 UTC+3)		Report	Gündoğan 51', 57'; Werner 71'	Stadium: A. Le Coq Arena; Attendance: 12,062; Referee: Georgi Kabakov (Bulgaria)

16 November 2019 UEFA Euro 2020 qualifying	Germany	4–0	Belarus	Mönchengladbach, Germany
20:45 (20:45 UTC+1)	Ginter 41'; Goretzka 49'; Kroos 55', 83'	Report		Stadium: Borussia-Park; Attendance: 33,164; Referee: Orel Grinfeld (Israel)

19 November 2019 UEFA Euro 2020 qualifying	Germany	6–1	Northern Ireland	Frankfurt, Germany
20:45 (20:45 UTC+1)	Gnabry 19', 47', 60'; Goretzka 43', 73'; Brandt 90+1'	Report	Smith 7'	Stadium: Commerzbank-Arena; Attendance: 42,855; Referee: Carlos del Cerro Grande (Spain)

==== Friendly matches ====
Win Draw Loss Void

9 October 2019 Friendly	Germany	2–2	Argentina	Dortmund, Germany
20:45 (20:45 UTC+2)	Gnabry 15'; Havertz 22'	Report	Alario 66'; Ocampos 85'	Stadium: Signal Iduna Park; Attendance: 45,197; Referee: Clément Turpin (France)

Friendly	Spain	v	Germany	Madrid, Spain
		Report		Stadium: Wanda Metropolitano
Note: The match was cancelled due to a pandemic of COVID-19 in Spain.

Friendly	Germany	v	Italy	Nuremberg, Germany
		Report		Stadium: Max-Morlock-Stadion; Referee: Andris Treimanis (Latvia)
Note: The match was cancelled due to a pandemic of COVID-19 in Germany.

Friendly	Switzerland	v	Germany	Basel, Switzerland
		Report		Stadium: St. Jakob-Park
Note: The match was cancelled due to a pandemic of COVID-19 in Germany.

=== Germany women's national football team ===
==== Kits ====
Home	Away	Home alt.	Away alt.

==== UEFA Women's Euro 2022 qualifying ====
===== UEFA Women's Euro 2022 qualifying Group I =====
Pos	Team	Pld	W	D	L	GF	GA	GD	Pts	Qualification	Germany	Ukraine	Ireland	Greece	Montenegro
1	Germany	8	8	0	0	46	1	+45	24	Final tournament	—	8–0	3–0	6–0	10–0
2	Ukraine	8	5	0	3	16	21	−5	15	Play-offs	0–8	—	1–0	4–0	2–1
3	Republic of Ireland	8	4	1	3	11	10	+1	13		1–3	3–2	—	1–0	2–0
4	Greece	8	2	1	5	6	21	−15	7		0–5	0–4	1–1	—	1–0
5	Montenegro	8	0	0	8	2	28	−26	0		0–3	1–3	0–3	0–4	—

Source: UEFA
Rules for classification: Tiebreakers

===== UEFA Women's Euro 2022 qualifying fixtures and results =====
Win Draw Loss

31 August 2019 UEFA Women's Euro 2022 qualifying	Germany	10–0	Montenegro	Kassel, Germany
12:30 (12:30 UTC+2)	Huth 3'; Popp 7', 24', 38'; Bühl 35', 59'; Doorsoun 52'; Knaak 54'; Schüller 84'; Dallmann 88'	Report		Stadium: Auestadion; Attendance: 6,275; Referee: Zulema González González (Spain)

3 September 2019 UEFA Women's Euro 2022 qualifying	Ukraine	0–8	Germany	Lviv, Ukraine
16:00 (17:00 UTC+3)		Report	Däbritz 5', 80', 88'; Magull 28'; Rauch 32'; Oberdorf 54'; Huth 85'; Maier 90+2'	Stadium: Arena Lviv; Attendance: 1,000; Referee: Tess Olofsson (Sweden)

5 October 2019 UEFA Women's Euro 2022 qualifying	Germany	8–0	Ukraine	Aachen, Germany
14:00 (14:00 UTC+2)	Bühl 7', 58', 61'; Gwinn 30'; Magull 37', 42', 90+3'; Leupolz 87'	Report		Stadium: New Tivoli; Attendance: 5,504; Referee: Lorraine Clark (Scotland)

8 October 2019 UEFA Women's Euro 2022 qualifying	Greece	0–5	Germany	Thessaloniki, Greece
14:00 (15:00 UTC+3)		Report	Popp 33'; Oberdorf 40'; Starke 65'; Bremer 75'; Bühl 90'	Stadium: Kleanthis Vikelidis Stadium; Referee: Vera Opeykina (Russia)

==== 2020 Algarve Cup ====
Win Draw Loss Void

4 March 2020 Qualification	Germany	1–0	Sweden	Faro/Loulé, Portugal
17:30 (16:30 UTC±0)	Huth 34'	Report		Stadium: Estádio Algarve; Attendance: 800; Referee: Ivana Martinčić (Croatia)

7 March 2020 Semi-final	Germany	4–0	Norway	Lagos, Portugal
18:30 (17:30 UTC±0)	Schüller 20'; Elsig 26'; Engen 60' (o.g.); Hegering 71'	Report		Stadium: Lagos Municipal Stadium; Attendance: 300; Referee: Olga Zadinová (Czech Republic)

11 March 2020 Final	Italy	Cancelled	Germany	Parchal, Portugal
19:45 (18:45 UTC±0)				Stadium: Vista Municipal Stadium
Note: Italy decided not to play the final to return safely because of an outbreak of COVID-19 in Italy.

==== Friendly matches ====
Win Draw Loss

9 November 2019 Friendly	England	1–2	Germany	London, England
18:30 (17:30 UTC±0)	White 44'	Report	Popp 9'; Bühl 90'	Stadium: Wembley Stadium; Attendance: 77,768; Referee: Stéphanie Frappart (France)

Friendly	United States	Cancelled	Germany
Note: The match was cancelled on 4 April 2020 due to the COVID-19 pandemic.

Friendly	United States	Cancelled	Germany
Note: The match was cancelled on 4 April 2020 due to the COVID-19 pandemic.

== League season ==
=== Men ===
==== Bundesliga ====
===== Bundesliga standings =====
Pos	Team	Pld	W	D	L	GF	GA	GD	Pts	Qualification or relegation
1	Bayern Munich (C)	34	26	4	4	100	32	+68	82	Qualification for the Champions League group stage
2	Borussia Dortmund	34	21	6	7	84	41	+43	69	Qualification for the Champions League group stage
3	RB Leipzig	34	18	12	4	81	37	+44	66	Qualification for the Champions League group stage
4	Borussia Mönchengladbach	34	20	5	9	66	40	+26	65	Qualification for the Champions League group stage
5	Bayer Leverkusen	34	19	6	9	61	44	+17	63	Qualification for the Europa League group stage (Note: Since the winners of the 2019–20 DFB-Pokal, Bayern Munich, qualified for the Champions League based on league position, the Europa League group stage spot was passed to the sixth-placed team, and the Europa League second qualifying round spot was passed to the seventh-placed team.)
6	1899 Hoffenheim	34	15	7	12	53	53	0	52	Qualification for the Europa League group stage
7	VfL Wolfsburg	34	13	10	11	48	46	+2	49	Qualification for the Europa League second qualifying round
8	SC Freiburg	34	13	9	12	48	47	+1	48	
9	Eintracht Frankfurt	34	13	6	15	59	60	−1	45	
10	Hertha BSC	34	11	8	15	48	59	−11	41	
11	Union Berlin	34	12	5	17	41	58	−17	41	
12	Schalke 04	34	9	12	13	38	58	−20	39	
13	Mainz 05	34	11	4	19	44	65	−21	37	
14	1. FC Köln	34	10	6	18	51	69	−18	36	
15	FC Augsburg	34	9	9	16	45	63	−18	36	
16	Werder Bremen (O)	34	8	7	19	42	69	−27	31	Qualification for the relegation play-offs
17	Fortuna Düsseldorf (R)	34	6	12	16	36	67	−31	30	Relegation to 2. Bundesliga
18	SC Paderborn (R)	34	4	8	22	37	74	−37	20	Relegation to 2. Bundesliga

Source: DFB
Rules for classification: 1) Points; 2) Goal difference; 3) Goals scored; 4) Head-to-head results; 5) Head-to-head away goals scored; 6) Away goals scored; 7) Play-off.
(C) Champions; (O) Play-off winners; (R) Relegated

==== 2. Bundesliga ====
===== 2. Bundesliga standings =====
Pos	Team	Pld	W	D	L	GF	GA	GD	Pts	Promotion, qualification or relegation
1	Arminia Bielefeld (C, P)	34	18	14	2	65	30	+35	68	Promotion to Bundesliga
2	VfB Stuttgart (P)	34	17	7	10	62	41	+21	58	Promotion to Bundesliga
3	1. FC Heidenheim	34	15	10	9	45	36	+9	55	Qualification to promotion play-offs
4	Hamburger SV	34	14	12	8	62	46	+16	54	
5	Darmstadt 98	34	13	13	8	48	43	+5	52	
6	Hannover 96	34	13	9	12	54	49	+5	48	
7	Erzgebirge Aue	34	13	8	13	46	48	−2	47	
8	VfL Bochum	34	11	13	10	53	51	+2	46	
9	Greuther Fürth	34	11	11	12	46	45	+1	44	
10	SV Sandhausen	34	10	13	11	43	45	−2	43	
11	Holstein Kiel	34	11	10	13	53	56	−3	43	
12	Jahn Regensburg	34	11	10	13	50	56	−6	43	
13	VfL Osnabrück	34	9	13	12	46	48	−2	40	
14	FC St. Pauli	34	9	12	13	41	50	−9	39	
15	Karlsruher SC	34	8	13	13	45	56	−11	37	
16	1. FC Nürnberg (O)	34	8	13	13	45	58	−13	37	Qualification to relegation play-offs
17	Wehen Wiesbaden (R)	34	9	7	18	45	65	−20	34	Relegation to 3. Liga
18	Dynamo Dresden (R)	34	8	8	18	32	58	−26	32	Relegation to 3. Liga

Source: DFB
Rules for classification: 1) Points; 2) Goal difference; 3) Goals scored; 4) Head-to-head points; 5) Head-to-head goal difference; 6) Head-to-head away goals scored; 7) Away goals scored; 8) Play-off.
(C) Champions; (O) Play-off winners; (P) Promoted; (R) Relegated

==== 3. Liga ====
===== 3. Liga standings =====
Pos	Team	Pld	W	D	L	GF	GA	GD	Pts	Promotion, qualification or relegation
1	Bayern Munich II (Note: Reserve teams are ineligible for promotion or DFB-Pokal qualification.) (C)	38	19	8	11	76	60	+16	65	
2	Würzburger Kickers (P)	38	19	7	12	71	60	+11	64	Promotion to 2. Bundesliga and qualification for DFB-Pokal
3	Eintracht Braunschweig (P)	38	18	10	10	64	53	+11	64	Promotion to 2. Bundesliga and qualification for DFB-Pokal
4	FC Ingolstadt	38	17	12	9	61	40	+21	63	Qualification for promotion play-offs and DFB-Pokal
5	MSV Duisburg	38	17	11	10	68	48	+20	62	Qualification for DFB-Pokal
6	Hansa Rostock	38	17	8	13	54	43	+11	59	
7	SV Meppen	38	16	10	12	69	57	+12	58	
8	1860 Munich	38	16	10	12	63	54	+9	58	
9	Waldhof Mannheim	38	13	17	8	52	47	+5	56	
10	1. FC Kaiserslautern	38	14	13	11	59	54	+5	55	
11	SpVgg Unterhaching	38	12	15	11	50	53	−3	51	
12	Viktoria Köln	38	14	9	15	65	71	−6	51	
13	KFC Uerdingen	38	12	12	14	40	54	−14	48	
14	1. FC Magdeburg	38	10	17	11	49	42	+7	47	
15	Hallescher FC	38	12	10	16	64	66	−2	46	
16	FSV Zwickau	38	11	11	16	56	61	−5	44	
17	Chemnitzer FC (R)	38	11	11	16	54	60	−6	44	Relegation to Regionalliga
18	Preußen Münster (R)	38	9	13	16	49	62	−13	40	Relegation to Regionalliga
19	Sonnenhof Großaspach (R)	38	8	8	22	33	67	−34	32	Relegation to Regionalliga
20	Carl Zeiss Jena (R)	38	5	8	25	40	85	−45	23	Relegation to Regionalliga

Source: DFB
Rules for classification: 1) Points; 2) Goal difference; 3) Goals scored; 4) Head-to-head results; 5) Head-to-head away goals scored; 6) Away goals scored; 7) Play-off.
(C) Champions; (P) Promoted; (R) Relegated

==== DFB-Pokal ====
===== Final =====
4 July 2020
20:00 CEST

Bayer Leverkusen	2–4	Bayern Munich
S. Bender 64'; Havertz 90+5' (pen.)	Report	Alaba 16'; Gnabry 24'; Lewandowski 59', 89'

Olympiastadion, Berlin
Attendance: 0 (Note: The semi-finals and final was played behind closed doors due to the COVID-19 pandemic in Germany.)
Referee: Tobias Welz (Wiesbaden)

==== DFL-Supercup ====
3 August 2019
20:30 CEST

Borussia Dortmund	2–0	Bayern Munich
Alcácer 48'; Sancho 69'	Report

Signal Iduna Park, Dortmund
Attendance: 81,365
Referee: Daniel Siebert (Berlin)

=== Women ===
==== Frauen-Bundesliga ====
===== Bundesliga standings =====
Pos	Team	Pld	W	D	L	GF	GA	GD	Pts	Qualification or relegation
1	VfL Wolfsburg (C)	22	20	2	0	93	8	+85	62	Qualification for Champions League
2	Bayern Munich	22	17	3	2	60	14	+46	54	Qualification for Champions League
3	1899 Hoffenheim	22	16	1	5	67	24	+43	49	
4	Turbine Potsdam	22	12	1	9	52	45	+7	37	
5	SGS Essen	22	11	2	9	41	39	+2	35	
6	1. FFC Frankfurt	22	10	3	9	44	47	−3	33	
7	SC Freiburg	22	9	4	9	43	47	−4	31	
8	SC Sand	22	8	1	13	24	43	−19	25	
9	MSV Duisburg	22	4	5	13	19	47	−28	17	
10	Bayer Leverkusen	22	5	2	15	22	51	−29	17	
11	1. FC Köln (R)	22	5	2	15	22	60	−38	17	Relegation to 2. Bundesliga
12	USV Jena (R)	22	0	4	18	15	77	−62	4	Relegation to 2. Bundesliga

Source: DFB
Rules for classification: 1) Points; 2) Goal difference; 3) Goals scored; 4) Head-to-head points; 5) Head-to-head goal difference; 6) Head-to-head goals scored; 7) Head-to-head away goals scored; 8) Away goals scored; 9) Play-off.
(C) Champions; (R) Relegated

==== 2. Frauen-Bundesliga ====
===== 2. Bundesliga standings =====
Pos	Team	Pld	W	D	L	GF	GA	GD	Pts	Promotion
1	Werder Bremen (C, P)	16	12	4	0	45	13	+32	40	Promotion to Bundesliga
2	VfL Wolfsburg II (Note: Reserve teams cannot compete in the Frauen-Bundesliga and therefore were ineligible for promotion.)	16	9	2	5	32	16	+16	29	
3	1899 Hoffenheim II	16	8	5	3	37	27	+10	29	
4	SV Meppen (P)	16	8	3	5	29	27	+2	27	Promotion to Bundesliga
5	Borussia Mönchengladbach	16	8	2	6	30	32	−2	26	
6	FC Ingolstadt	16	6	4	6	33	32	+1	22	
7	Turbine Potsdam II	16	7	1	8	39	43	−4	22	
8	Bayern Munich II	16	6	3	7	24	32	−8	21	
9	FSV Gütersloh	16	6	2	8	28	28	0	20	
10	BV Cloppenburg	16	3	7	6	27	38	−11	16	
11	SG Andernach	16	5	1	10	27	40	−13	16	
12	1. FC Saarbrücken (Note: Originally the bottom three placed teams would have been relegated, but after the season was cancelled because of the COVID-19 pandemic in Germany, it was announced that no team was relegated.)	16	5	1	10	26	39	−13	16	
13	1. FFC Frankfurt II	16	3	6	7	28	32	−4	15	
14	Arminia Bielefeld	16	4	3	9	27	33	−6	15	

Source: DFB
Rules for classification: 1) Points; 2) Goal difference; 3) Goals scored; 4) Head-to-head points; 5) Head-to-head goal difference; 6) Head-to-head goals scored; 7) Head-to-head away goals scored; 8) Away goals scored; 9) Play-off.
(C) Champions; (P) Promoted

==== DFB-Pokal (women) ====
===== Final =====
4 July 2020
16:45 (UTC+2)

VfL Wolfsburg	3–3 (a.e.t.)	SGS Essen
Harder 11'; Blässe 70'; Bloodworth 86'	Report	Schüller 1'; Hegering 18'; Ioannidou 90+1'
Penalties
Bloodworth (penalty scored); Neto (penalty scored); Popp (penalty missed); Goeßling (penalty scored); Harder (penalty scored)	4–2	(penalty scored) Schüller; (penalty scored) Oberdorf; (penalty missed) Ioannidou; (penalty missed) Brüggemann

RheinEnergieStadion, Cologne
Attendance: 0 (Note: The semi-finals and final will be played behind closed doors due to the COVID-19 pandemic in Germany.)
Referee: Nadine Westerhoff

== German clubs in Europe ==
=== UEFA Champions League ===
==== Group stage ====
===== Group B =====
Pos	Team	Pld	W	D	L	GF	GA	GD	Pts	Qualification	BAY	TOT	OLY	RSB
1	(Germany) Bayern Munich	6	6	0	0	24	5	+19	18	Advance to knockout phase	—	3–1	2–0	3–0
2	(England) Tottenham Hotspur	6	3	1	2	18	14	+4	10	Advance to knockout phase	2–7	—	4–2	5–0
3	(Greece) Olympiacos	6	1	1	4	8	14	−6	4	Transfer to Europa League	2–3	2–2	—	1–0
4	(Serbia) Red Star Belgrade	6	1	0	5	3	20	−17	3		0–6	0–4	3–1	—

Source: UEFA

===== Group D =====
Pos	Team	Pld	W	D	L	GF	GA	GD	Pts	Qualification	JUV	ATM	LEV	LMO
1	(Italy) Juventus	6	5	1	0	12	4	+8	16	Advance to knockout phase	—	1–0	3–0	2–1
2	(Spain) Atlético Madrid	6	3	1	2	8	5	+3	10	Advance to knockout phase	2–2	—	1–0	2–0
3	(Germany) Bayer Leverkusen	6	2	0	4	5	9	−4	6	Transfer to Europa League	0–2	2–1	—	1–2
4	(Russia) Lokomotiv Moscow	6	1	0	5	4	11	−7	3		1–2	0–2	0–2	—

Source: UEFA

===== Group F =====
Pos	Team	Pld	W	D	L	GF	GA	GD	Pts	Qualification	BAR	DOR	INT	SLP
1	(Spain) Barcelona	6	4	2	0	9	4	+5	14	Advance to knockout phase	—	3–1	2–1	0–0
2	(Germany) Borussia Dortmund	6	3	1	2	8	8	0	10	Advance to knockout phase	0–0	—	3–2	2–1
3	(Italy) Inter Milan	6	2	1	3	10	9	+1	7	Transfer to Europa League	1–2	2–0	—	1–1
4	(Czech Republic) Slavia Prague	6	0	2	4	4	10	−6	2		1–2	0–2	1–3	—

Source: UEFA

===== Group G =====
Pos	Team	Pld	W	D	L	GF	GA	GD	Pts	Qualification	RBL	LYO	BEN	ZEN
1	(Germany) RB Leipzig	6	3	2	1	10	8	+2	11	Advance to knockout phase	—	0–2	2–2	2–1
2	(France) Lyon	6	2	2	2	9	8	+1	8	Advance to knockout phase	2–2	—	3–1	1–1
3	(Portugal) Benfica	6	2	1	3	10	11	−1	7 (Note: Tied on head-to-head points (3). Head-to-head goal difference: Benfica +1, Zenit Saint Petersburg −1.)	Transfer to Europa League	1–2	2–1	—	3–0
4	(Russia) Zenit Saint Petersburg	6	2	1	3	7	9	−2	7		0–2	2–0	3–1	—

Source: UEFA

==== Knockout phase ====
===== Round of 16 =====
Team 1	Agg.	Team 2	1st leg	2nd leg
Borussia Dortmund (Germany)	2–3	(France) Paris Saint-Germain	2–1	0–2
Chelsea (England)	1–7	(Germany) Bayern Munich	0–3	1–4
Tottenham Hotspur (England)	0–4	(Germany) RB Leipzig	0–1	0–3

===== Quarter-finals =====
Team 1	Score	Team 2
RB Leipzig (Germany)	2–1	(Spain) Atlético Madrid
Barcelona (Spain)	2–8	(Germany) Bayern Munich

===== Semi-finals =====
Team 1	Score	Team 2
Lyon (France)	0–3	(Germany) Bayern Munich
RB Leipzig (Germany)	0–3	(France) Paris Saint-Germain

===== Final =====
The "home" team (for administrative purposes) was determined by an additional draw held on 10 July 2020 (after the quarter-final and semi-final draws), at the UEFA headquarters in Nyon, Switzerland.

23 August 2020
20:00 UTC+1

Paris Saint-Germain (France)	0–1	(Germany) Bayern Munich
	Report	Coman 59'

Estádio da Luz, Lisbon
Attendance: 0 (Note: The remainder of the competition, held in August 2020, was played behind closed doors due to the COVID-19 pandemic in Europe.)
Referee: Daniele Orsato (Italy)

=== UEFA Europa League ===
==== Qualifying phase and play-off round ====
===== Second qualifying round =====
Team 1	Agg.	Team 2	1st leg	2nd leg
Flora (Estonia)	2–4	(Germany) Eintracht Frankfurt	1–2	1–2

===== Third qualifying round =====
Team 1	Agg.	Team 2	1st leg	2nd leg
Vaduz (Liechtenstein)	0–6	(Germany) Eintracht Frankfurt	0–5	0–1

===== Play-off round =====
Team 1	Agg.	Team 2	1st leg	2nd leg
Strasbourg (France)	1–3	(Germany) Eintracht Frankfurt	1–0	0–3

==== Group stage ====
===== Group F =====
Pos	Team	Pld	W	D	L	GF	GA	GD	Pts	Qualification	ARS	FRA	STL	VSC
1	(England) Arsenal	6	3	2	1	14	7	+7	11	Advance to knockout phase	—	1–2	4–0	3–2
2	(Germany) Eintracht Frankfurt	6	3	0	3	8	10	−2	9	Advance to knockout phase	0–3	—	2–1	2–3
3	(Belgium) Standard Liège	6	2	2	2	8	10	−2	8		2–2	2–1	—	2–0
4	(Portugal) Vitória de Guimarães	6	1	2	3	7	10	−3	5		1–1	0–1	1–1	—

Source: UEFA

===== Group I =====
Pos	Team	Pld	W	D	L	GF	GA	GD	Pts	Qualification	GNT	WLF	STE	OLE
1	(Belgium) Gent	6	3	3	0	11	7	+4	12	Advance to knockout phase	—	2–2	3–2	2–1
2	(Germany) VfL Wolfsburg	6	3	2	1	9	7	+2	11	Advance to knockout phase	1–3	—	1–0	3–1
3	(France) Saint-Étienne	6	0	4	2	6	8	−2	4		0–0	1–1	—	1–1
4	(Ukraine) Oleksandriya	6	0	3	3	6	10	−4	3		1–1	0–1	2–2	—

Source: UEFA

===== Group J =====
Pos	Team	Pld	W	D	L	GF	GA	GD	Pts	Qualification	IBS	ROM	MGB	WLB
1	(Turkey) İstanbul Başakşehir	6	3	1	2	7	9	−2	10	Advance to knockout phase	—	0–3	1–1	1–0
2	(Italy) Roma	6	2	3	1	12	6	+6	9	Advance to knockout phase	4–0	—	1–1	2–2
3	(Germany) Borussia Mönchengladbach	6	2	2	2	6	9	−3	8		1–2	2–1	—	0–4
4	(Austria) Wolfsberger AC	6	1	2	3	7	8	−1	5		0–3	1–1	0–1	—

Source: UEFA

==== Knockout phase ====
===== Round of 32 =====
Team 1	Agg.	Team 2	1st leg	2nd leg
Bayer Leverkusen (Germany)	5–2	(Portugal) Porto	2–1	3–1
Eintracht Frankfurt (Germany)	6–3	(Austria) Red Bull Salzburg	4–1	2–2
VfL Wolfsburg (Germany)	5–1	(Sweden) Malmö FF	2–1	3–0

===== Round of 16 =====
Team 1	Agg.	Team 2	1st leg	2nd leg
Rangers (Scotland)	1–4	(Germany) Bayer Leverkusen	1–3	0–1
VfL Wolfsburg (Germany)	1–5	(Ukraine) Shakhtar Donetsk	1–2	0–3
Eintracht Frankfurt (Germany)	0–4	(Switzerland) Basel	0–3	0–1

===== Quarter-finals =====
Team 1	Score	Team 2
Inter Milan (Italy)	2–1	(Germany) Bayer Leverkusen

=== UEFA Women's Champions League ===
==== Knockout phase ====
===== Round of 32 =====
Team 1	Agg.	Team 2	1st leg	2nd leg
Kopparbergs/Göteborg (Sweden)	2–2 (a)	(Germany) Bayern Munich	1–2	1–0
Mitrovica (Kosovo)	0–15	(Germany) VfL Wolfsburg	0–10	0–5

===== Round of 16 =====
Team 1	Agg.	Team 2	1st leg	2nd leg
BIIK Kazygurt (Kazakhstan)	0–7	(Germany) Bayern Munich	0–5	0–2
VfL Wolfsburg (Germany)	7–0	(Netherlands) Twente	6–0	1–0

===== Quarter-finals =====
Team 1	Score	Team 2
Lyon (France)	2–1	(Germany) Bayern Munich
Glasgow City (Scotland)	1–9	(Germany) VfL Wolfsburg

===== Semi-finals =====
Team 1	Score	Team 2
VfL Wolfsburg (Germany)	1–0	(Spain) Barcelona

===== Final =====
30 August 2020
20:00 UTC+2

VfL Wolfsburg (Germany)	1–3	(France) Lyon
Popp 58'	Report	Le Sommer 25'; Kumagai 44'; Gunnarsdóttir 88'

Anoeta, San Sebastián
Attendance: 0 (Note: The remainder of the competition, held in August 2020, was played behind closed doors due to the COVID-19 pandemic in Europe.)
Referee: Esther Staubli (Switzerland)
