= 2020 UEFA Champions League final =

Football match in Lisbon, Portugal

- Match programme cover
- Event: 2019–20 UEFA Champions League
Paris Saint-Germain	Bayern Munich
(France)	(Germany)
0	1
- Date: 23 August 2020
- Venue: Estádio da Luz, Lisbon
- Man of the Match: Kingsley Coman (Bayern Munich)
- Referee: Daniele Orsato (Italy)
- Attendance: 0 (Note: The remainder of the competition, held in August 2020, was played behind closed doors due to the COVID-19 pandemic in Europe.)
- Weather: Clear night 25 °C (77 °F); 53% humidity

The 2020 UEFA Champions League final was the final match of the 2019–20 UEFA Champions League, the 65th season of Europe's premier club football tournament organised by UEFA, and the 28th season since it was re-branded from the European Champion Clubs' Cup to the UEFA Champions League. It was played on 23 August 2020 at the Estádio da Luz in Lisbon, Portugal, between French club Paris Saint-Germain, in their first European Cup final, and German club Bayern Munich having returned to the final for the first time since 2013. The match was held behind closed doors due to the COVID-19 pandemic in Europe.

Originally, it had been scheduled to be played at the Atatürk Olympic Stadium in Istanbul, Turkey, on 30 May 2020. On 17 June 2020, the UEFA Executive Committee chose to relocate the final to Lisbon as part of a "final-eight tournament" consisting of single-match knockout ties played in two stadiums across the city. The match was the first European premier tournament final to be played on a Sunday, and the first since 2009 to not be played on a Saturday. It was also the first final of the competition to be played after June.

Bayern Munich won the final 1–0 thanks to a 59th-minute goal scored by former Paris Saint-Germain player Kingsley Coman assisted by Joshua Kimmich, who was later selected as man of the match. Bayern secured their sixth European Cup title and second continental treble, becoming the second European men's football team to win the continental treble twice. Bayern also became the first team to claim any European competition with a 100% winning record. As winners, they earned the right to play against the winners of the 2019–20 UEFA Europa League, Sevilla, in the 2020 UEFA Super Cup, and also qualified for the 2020 FIFA Club World Cup in Qatar; Bayern went on to win both and complete a historic sextuple (six trophies in a year).

== Venue ==
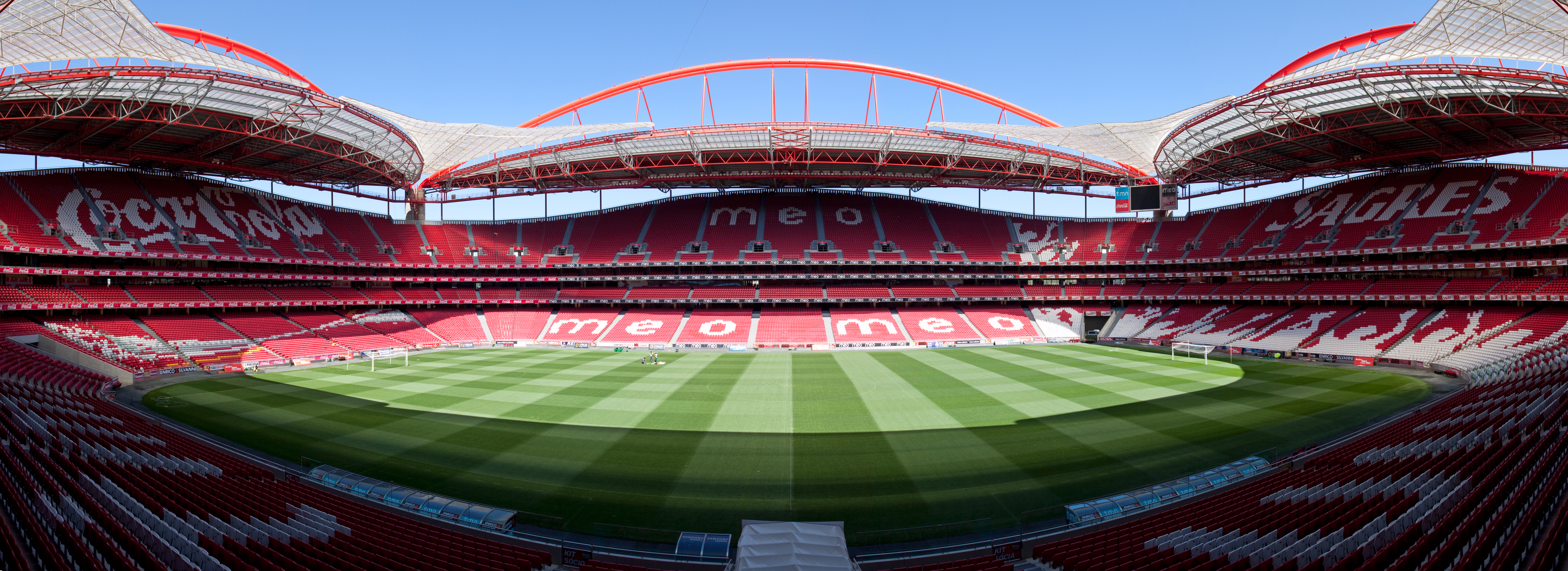
The Estádio da Luz in Lisbon hosted the final.

The final was originally scheduled to be played at the Atatürk Olympic Stadium in Istanbul, Turkey, on 30 May 2020. However, UEFA announced on 23 March 2020 that the final was postponed due to the COVID-19 pandemic. On 17 June 2020, the UEFA Executive Committee chose to relocate the final to Lisbon as part of a "final-eight tournament" consisting of single-match knockout ties played in two stadiums across the city. The match was the first European Cup/Champions League final to be played on a Sunday and the first since 2009 to not be played on a Saturday. It was also the first final of the competition to be played after June.

The UEFA Executive Committee chose the Estádio da Luz, officially known as the Estádio do Sport Lisboa e Benfica, in Lisbon as the final venue at their meeting on 17 June 2020. This is the second UEFA Champions League final hosted at the stadium; the first was in 2014, when Real Madrid secured their 10th title by beating Atlético Madrid 4–1 in the first final between teams from the same city.

The home stadium of Portuguese Primeira Liga side Benfica since 2003, it was newly built to host five matches of UEFA Euro 2004, including the final. Before its demolition in 2003, to make way for the new 65,000-capacity ground, the original Estádio da Luz hosted the 1992 European Cup Winners' Cup final, where Werder Bremen beat Monaco 2–0, and the second leg of the 1983 UEFA Cup final, where Anderlecht secured a 1–1 draw with Benfica to lift the trophy.

Lisbon had also staged a European Cup final in 1967, when Scottish side Celtic beat Inter Milan of Italy 2–1 at the Estádio Nacional. The Portuguese capital also hosted the 2005 UEFA Cup final at the Estádio José Alvalade, home of Benfica's local rivals and finalists Sporting CP, who lost 3–1 to CSKA Moscow.

== Background ==
Paris Saint-Germain (PSG) reached their first European Cup/Champions League final, becoming the fifth finalist representing France and the 41st overall. They entered the final having played 110 prior matches in the European Cup and Champions League, the most for a final debutant, surpassing Arsenal's record of 90 matches prior to their final debut in 2006. The match was the seventh final to feature a French team, and the first since Monaco in 2004. Marseille were the only French club to have won the competition, doing so in 1993. The match was the fourth time Paris Saint-Germain have appeared in the final of a UEFA competition, having previously appeared in two consecutive finals of the UEFA Cup Winners' Cup. The club won the 1996 final 1–0 against Rapid Wien, before losing 1–0 against Barcelona while attempting to defend their title in 1997. PSG also featured in the 1996 UEFA Super Cup, losing 9–2 on aggregate to Juventus. Paris were attempting to become the first French team to complete a continental treble, having won Ligue 1, which was awarded to them based on PPG ratio as the season was ended prematurely due to the COVID-19 pandemic in France, and the Coupe de France. The club also won the final season of the Coupe de la Ligue (league cup) and the Trophée des Champions (super cup), thus winning all four domestic titles, though only the main domestic cup competition was considered for a continental treble.

In eighteen matches, Paris Saint-Germain had a record of eleven wins, two draws and five losses against German clubs in European competition. PSG won all four prior knockout ties in which they met German opposition, including earlier in the season against Borussia Dortmund in the round of 16 and RB Leipzig in the semi-finals.

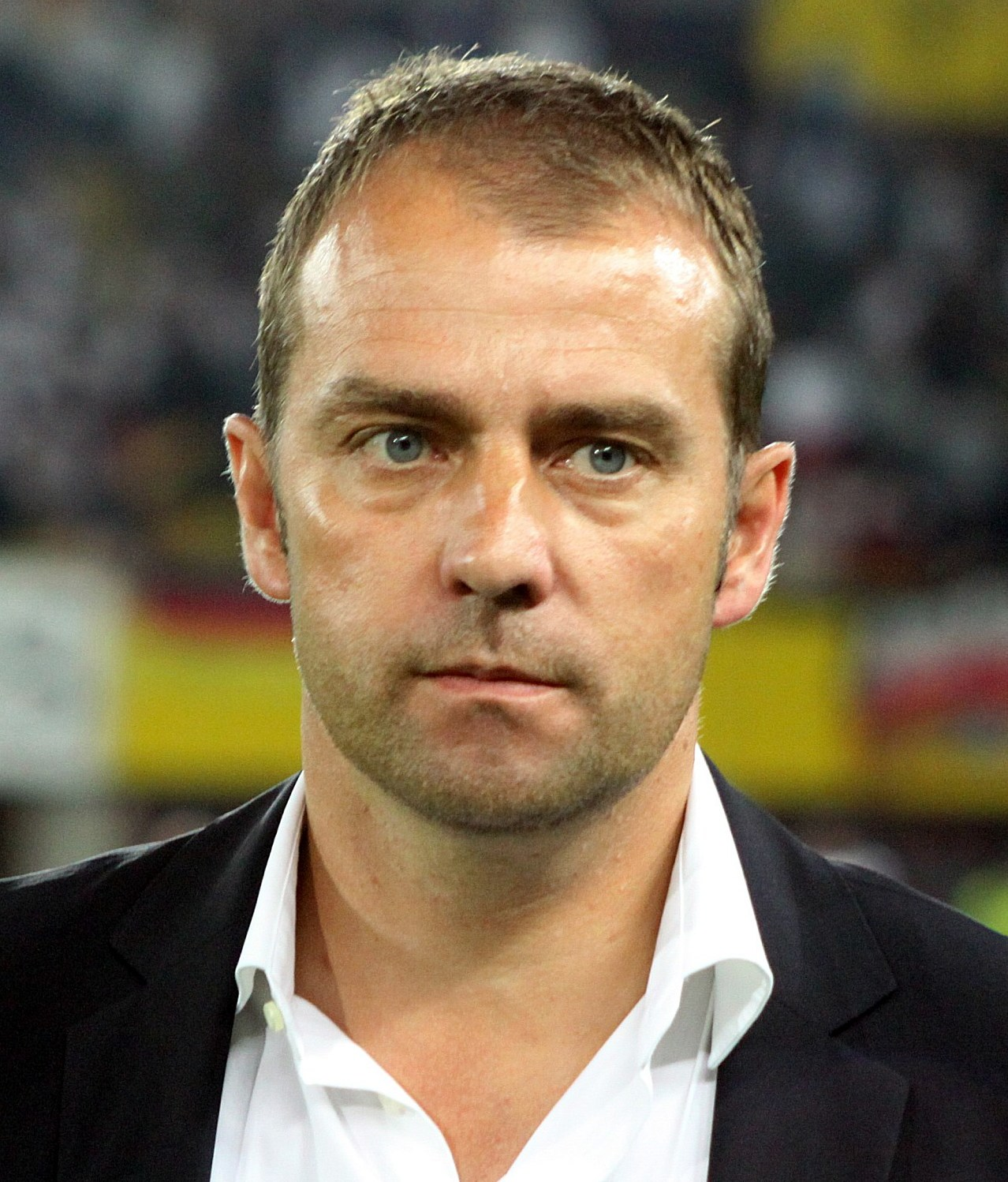
Bayern Munich manager Hansi Flick appeared in his second European Cup final, having lost as a player with Bayern in 1987.

Bayern Munich reached their eleventh European Cup/Champions League final, tying Milan for the second-most finals behind Real Madrid's 16. Most recently they appeared in the 2013 final, in which they won 2–1 against archrivals Borussia Dortmund for their fifth title. In their prior finals, Bayern Munich won on four other occasions in 1974, 1975, 1976 and 2001, and lost in 1982, 1987, 1999, 2010 and 2012. The match was Bayern's 13th overall final in European competition, having won the 1967 European Cup Winners' Cup Final 1–0 after extra time against Rangers and the 1996 UEFA Cup Final 5–1 on aggregate against Bordeaux. Bayern Munich were chasing a second treble in club history (previously doing so in 2012–13), having won the Bundesliga and DFB-Pokal. Entering the final, Bayern are on a 20-match winning streak and undefeated in 2020, having not lost in their prior 29 matches (winning 28 and drawing once). With their semi-final win, Bayern also tied the record for the most consecutive wins in the competition proper, as well as the most wins from the start of the competition proper, with 10. Bayern are the second team to have entered the final with a perfect winning record, after Milan in 1993, who lost to the only French winners in competition history at that point, Marseille. Bayern are also the second club to reach the final after winning all six group stage matches, after the aforementioned Milan team in 1992–93.

Bayern Munich scored 42 goals in 10 matches during the competition prior to the final, second only to Barcelona's record of 45 goals in 16 matches during the 1999–2000 season. However, Bayern set a new record for the best goals per game ratio in competition history following their quarter-final (regardless of the outcome of the remainder of the competition), with 4.2 per match after their semi-final victory. Entering the final, forward Robert Lewandowski scored 15 goals in 9 matches during the Champions League season, with only Cristiano Ronaldo having scored more in a single campaign (17 in 2013–14 and 16 in 2015–16). Lewandowski also tied Ruud van Nistelrooy's mark from 2002–03 of scoring in nine consecutive Champions League matches, second only to Ronaldo's 11 from 2017–18. Lewandowski and Serge Gnabry set a record for the most prolific scoring partnership in a season with 24 combined goals, surpassing the record of 23 between Ronaldo and Gareth Bale in 2013–14. Bayern manager Hansi Flick became the 15th individual to appear in a Champions League final as both a player and manager, having played for Bayern in their loss to Porto in the 1987 final.

In 34 matches, Bayern Munich had a record of 19 wins, 5 draws and ten losses against French clubs in European competition. Bayern won six of their seven previous knockout ties against French opposition, two of which were finals, including their semi-final win over Lyon to reach the 2020 final. Bayern's only loss was 3–2 on aggregate against Saint-Étienne in the first round of the 1969–70 European Cup.

The final was the ninth meeting between Paris Saint-Germain and Bayern Munich, with a record of five wins for PSG and three wins for Bayern. The fixture was the first knockout match between the sides, with all their prior meetings occurring in the Champions League group stages. The sides most recently met in the 2017–18 UEFA Champions League group stage; Paris won the first match 3–0 at home, while Bayern won the return match 3–1. As the sides were level on points, PSG won the group on head-to-head goal difference.

The match was the second European Cup final to feature a French and German team, after the 1976 final between Bayern and Saint-Étienne. Overall, it was the fourth final in European competition between teams from France and Germany, also occurring in the 1992 European Cup Winners' Cup Final (between Werder Bremen and Monaco) and the 1996 UEFA Cup Final (between Bayern and Bordeaux). On all three occasions, German teams were victorious. It was also the third final in which both teams entered the match seeking a win to secure the treble, previously occurring in 2010, in which Bayern lost to Inter Milan, and 2015, when Barcelona defeated Juventus. The 1999 final, won by Manchester United, also had both finalists seeking a treble, though Bayern had not yet contested their domestic cup final (which they ultimately lost). Both sides came into the final having won their domestic leagues the previous season, the first time this had happened since the 1998 final between Juventus and Real Madrid. It was also the first time since 1994 that both finalists won their domestic league in the previous and same season as reaching the final. The final was also the second to feature two German managers, after the 2013 edition with managers Jürgen Klopp for Borussia Dortmund and Jupp Heynckes for Bayern Munich.

=== Previous finals ===
In the following table, finals until 1992 were in the European Cup era, since 1993 were in the UEFA Champions League era.

Team	Previous final appearances (bold indicates winners)
(France) Paris Saint-Germain	None
(Germany) Bayern Munich	10 (**1974**, **1975**, **1976**, 1982, 1987, 1999, **2001**, 2010, 2012, **2013**)

== Route to the final ==
Note: In all results below, the score of the finalist is given first (H: home; A: away; N: neutral).

(France) Paris Saint-Germain				Round	(Germany) Bayern Munich			
Opponent	Result			Group stage	Opponent	Result		
(Spain) Real Madrid	3–0 (H)			Matchday 1	(Serbia) Red Star Belgrade	3–0 (H)		
(Turkey) Galatasaray	1–0 (A)			Matchday 2	(England) Tottenham Hotspur	7–2 (A)		
(Belgium) Club Brugge	5–0 (A)			Matchday 3	(Greece) Olympiacos	3–2 (A)		
(Belgium) Club Brugge	1–0 (H)			Matchday 4	(Greece) Olympiacos	2–0 (H)		
(Spain) Real Madrid	2–2 (A)			Matchday 5	(Serbia) Red Star Belgrade	6–0 (A)		
(Turkey) Galatasaray	5–0 (H)			Matchday 6	(England) Tottenham Hotspur	3–1 (H)		
Group A winners: Pos / Team / Pld / Pts; 1 / (France) Paris Saint-Germain / 6 / 16; 2 / (Spain) Real Madrid / 6 / 11; 3 / (Belgium) Club Brugge / 6 / 3; 4 / (Turkey) Galatasaray / 6 / 2; Source: UEFA				Final standings	Group B winners: Pos / Team / Pld / Pts; 1 / (Germany) Bayern Munich / 6 / 18; 2 / (England) Tottenham Hotspur / 6 / 10; 3 / (Greece) Olympiacos / 6 / 4; 4 / (Serbia) Red Star Belgrade / 6 / 3; Source: UEFA			
Opponent	Agg.	1st leg	2nd leg	Knockout phase	Opponent	Agg.	1st leg	2nd leg
(Germany) Borussia Dortmund	3–2	1–2 (A)	2–0 (H)	Round of 16	(England) Chelsea	7–1	3–0 (A)	4–1 (H)
(Italy) Atalanta	2–1 (N)			Quarter-finals	(Spain) Barcelona	8–2 (N)		
(Germany) RB Leipzig	3–0 (N)			Semi-finals	(France) Lyon	3–0 (N)		

=== Paris Saint-Germain ===
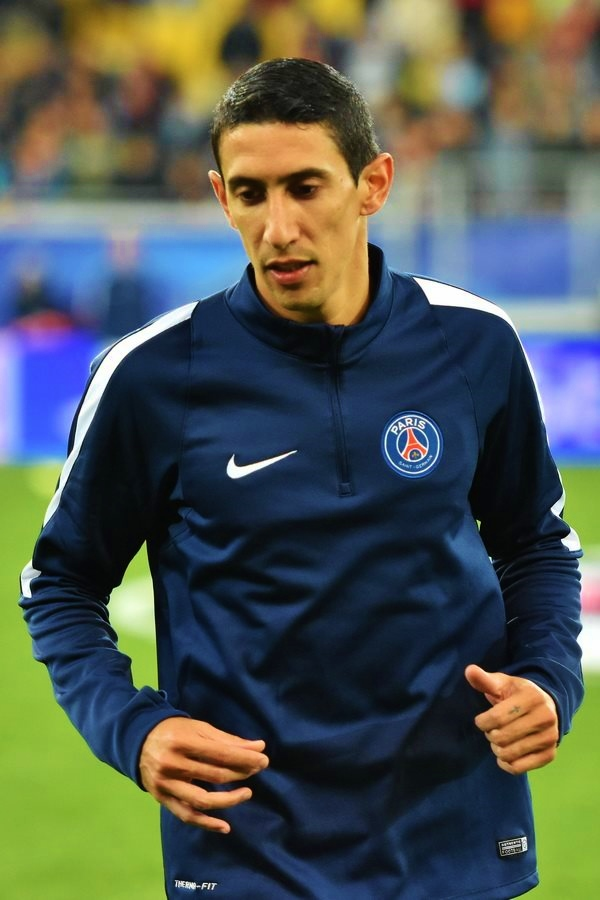
Ángel Di María of Paris Saint-Germain had the joint-most assists in the competition with six.

Paris Saint-Germain qualified for the Champions League group stage by winning the 2018–19 Ligue 1 season, their sixth title in seven seasons and eighth overall French title. In the group stage, they were drawn into Group A alongside Real Madrid of Spain, record winners of the European Cup, as well as Galatasaray of Turkey and Club Brugge of Belgium.

In the opening match of the group stage, Paris faced Real Madrid at the Parc des Princes and won 3–0 via a first-half brace from former Madrid player Ángel Di María and a second-half stoppage time goal from Thomas Meunier. On matchday 2, PSG won 1–0 against Galatasaray at the Türk Telekom Stadium with a 52nd-minute goal from Mauro Icardi. Paris Saint-Germain continued their perfect start to the competition by defeating Club Brugge 5–0 at the Jan Breydel Stadium, with a brace from Icardi and hat-trick from Kylian Mbappé. In their home meeting against Brugge, Icardi scored PSG's lone goal in a 1–0 win to advance to the knockout stage. On matchday 5, Paris recovered from a two-goal deficit to draw 2–2 at the Santiago Bernabéu against Madrid and win Group A, with Mbappé and Pablo Sarabia's late goals offsetting a Karim Benzema brace. In their final match, Paris Saint-Germain won 5–0 at home against Galatasaray to finish the group stage undefeated and having only conceded two goals.

In the round of 16, PSG were drawn against German club Borussia Dortmund. In the first leg at the Westfalenstadion, Paris lost 2–1 with Neymar scoring a goal in between a brace from Erling Haaland. The second leg was one of the last European matches played prior to the suspension of the competition due to the COVID-19 pandemic, and took place behind closed doors on 11 March 2020. PSG won the match 2–0 with first-half goals from Neymar and Juan Bernat, securing a 3–2 aggregate win for the Parisians and their first quarter-final appearance since the 2015–16 season.

Paris were drawn against Italian club Atalanta in the quarter-finals, who were participating in their debut season of the Champions League. The one-off tie was played on 12 August 2020 at the neutral Estádio da Luz. Atalanta took the lead in the first-half with a goal from Mario Pašalić. PSG struggled to find an equaliser in the second half, until Marquinhos scored from close range in the 90th minute before substitute Eric Maxim Choupo-Moting scored three minutes later to snatch a late win for Paris. Paris Saint-Germain advanced to the Champions League semi-finals for the second time in their history after the 1994–95 season.

In the semi-finals, Paris Saint-Germain faced RB Leipzig of Germany, who had qualified to the Champions League knockout stage for the first time in only their second season competing in the competition. Marquinhos and Di María scored in the first half at Estádio da Luz, while Bernat scored 11 minutes into the second period to earn PSG a 3–0 win and a spot in their first Champions League final.

=== Bayern Munich ===
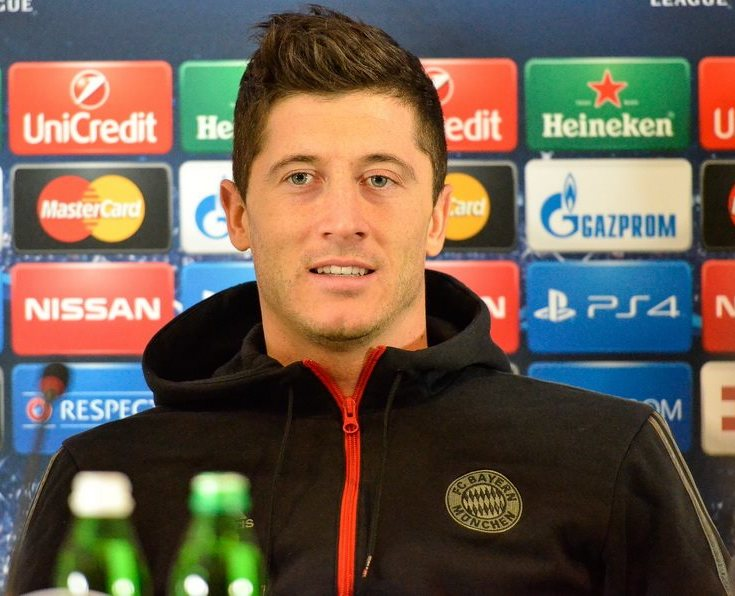
Bayern striker Robert Lewandowski was the competition's leading scorer and joint-leading assister with 15 goals and 6 assists en route to the final.

Bayern Munich qualified directly for the group stage of the Champions League by winning the 2018–19 Bundesliga, their 7th consecutive and 29th overall German title. In the group stage, they were drawn into Group B alongside Tottenham Hotspur of England, runners-up of the previous Champions League season, as well as Olympiacos of Greece and Red Star Belgrade of Serbia. The team began their season under Croatian manager Niko Kovač.

In their first match, Bayern faced Red Star Belgrade in a home match at the Allianz Arena and won 3–0 with goals from Kingsley Coman, Robert Lewandowski and Thomas Müller. In their second fixture against Tottenham at Tottenham Hotspur Stadium, Bayern won 7–2 with a goal from Joshua Kimmich, a brace from Lewandowski and four goals scored by Serge Gnabry. The result was the heaviest home loss by an English club in European competition. On matchday 3, Bayern faced Olympiacos at the Karaiskakis Stadium and recovered from a deficit to win 3–2 and maintain their lead in the group with a brace from Lewandowski followed by a curled goal from Corentin Tolisso, while Youssef El-Arabi and Guilherme scored for the Greek side.

However, as Bayern lost 5–1 to Eintracht Frankfurt in the Bundesliga on 2 November, manager Niko Kovač was sacked the following day and replaced by former assistant Hansi Flick on an interim basis. In Flick's first match in charge three days later, Bayern won the rematch against Olympiacos 2–0 via second-half goals from Lewandowski and Ivan Perišić, thus securing a spot in the knockout stage. On 26 November, Bayern Munich won 6–0 against Red Star Belgrade at the Red Star Stadium to win Group B, with Lewandowski scoring four times between goals from Leon Goretzka and Tolisso. In their final match, goals from Coman, Müller and Philippe Coutinho earned Bayern a 3–1 home win against Tottenham Hotspur to finish with a perfect group stage record, while Ryan Sessegnon scored the only goal for the visitors. This was the seventh occasion a team finished the group stage with six wins from six, with Bayern the sixth club to do so. Following a successful spell as interim manager, Bayern announced on 22 December that Flick would remain manager until the end of season.

Bayern were drawn against English club Chelsea in the round of 16, with the last Champions League meeting between the sides taking place in the 2012 final. In the first leg away at Stamford Bridge, Bayern won 3–0 via a brace from Gnabry followed by a tap-in from Lewandowski set-up by Alphonso Davies. Chelsea defender Marcos Alonso was sent off late in the match, which was the club's heaviest home loss in European competition. Following the match, Bayern chairman Karl-Heinz Rummenigge suggested Flick would stay permanently as manager. On 3 April, Flick signed a new contract with the club lasting until 2023. Due to the suspension of the competition due to the COVID-19 pandemic, the second leg was delayed from 18 March until 8 August 2020, and was played behind closed doors at the Allianz Arena. Bayern won the second meeting 4–1, with a Lewandowski brace and goals from Perišić and Tolisso earning a 7–1 victory on aggregate, while Tammy Abraham scored for the visitors. The result was Chelsea's heaviest defeat in a two-legged European tie.

As a result of the draw, Bayern faced Spanish club Barcelona in the quarter-finals. The match, played at the Estádio da Luz, finished as an 8–2 win for Bayern Munich, with Perišić, Gnabry, Kimmich and Lewandowski scoring once each while Müller and Coutinho both earned braces. David Alaba scored an early own goal for Barcelona, who netted their only other goal via a Luis Suárez strike in the 57th minute. For Bayern Munich, the result was the most goals scored by the club in a match during the Champions League era, and the second most for them in competition history after nine scored against Omonia in the 1972–73 European Cup. The match was the first time Barcelona conceded six goals or more in European competition, and the first time they conceded four goals in the first half of a Champions League match. It was Barcelona's heaviest defeat since 1951, when they lost 6–0 to Espanyol in the 1950–51 La Liga, and the first time they conceded eight goals in a game since 1946, when they lost 8–0 to Sevilla in the 1946 Copa del Generalísimo.

Bayern met French club Lyon in the semi-finals of the competition at the Estádio José Alvalade, a rematch of the 2009–10 semi-finals. Bayern won 3–0 with a brace from Gnabry followed by a late goal from Lewandowski to advance to their first Champions League final since 2013.

== Pre-match ==
Original identity of the final.

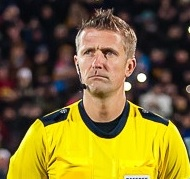
Italian Daniele Orsato was the referee for the final.

=== Identity ===
The original identity of the 2020 UEFA Champions League final was unveiled at the group-stage draw on 29 August 2019.

=== Ambassador ===
The ambassador for the original Istanbul final was former Turkish international Hamit Altıntop, who finished as runner-up in the 2009–10 UEFA Champions League with Bayern Munich as well as winning the 2003 and 2004 UEFA Intertoto Cups with Schalke 04.

=== Officials ===
On 20 August 2020, UEFA named Italian Daniele Orsato as the referee for the final. Orsato had been a FIFA referee since 2010, and was previously the fourth official in the 2019 UEFA Europa League Final. He was also an assistant video assistant referee in the 2018 FIFA World Cup Final. He was also an additional assistant referee at UEFA Euro 2016 and a video assistant referee at the 2018 FIFA World Cup. He was joined by four of his fellow countrymen, with Lorenzo Manganelli and Alessandro Giallatini as assistant referees, Massimiliano Irrati as the video assistant referee and Marco Guida as the assistant VAR official. The fourth official was Ovidiu Hațegan of Romania, while Spaniards Roberto Díaz Pérez del Palomar and Alejandro Hernández Hernández served as the offside and support VAR officials, respectively.

=== Team selection ===
Each team made one change to their starting line-up following the semi-finals. After recovering from injury, Paris Saint-Germain first-choice goalkeeper Keylor Navas started in place of Sergio Rico. For Bayern Munich, manager Hansi Flick decided to replace Ivan Perišić, who had started in the three prior Champions League matches, with Paris native Kingsley Coman on the left wing. Centre-back Jérôme Boateng was also deemed fit to start for Bayern, having suffered a minor injury in the semi-final which required him to be substituted off at half-time.

== Match ==
=== Summary ===
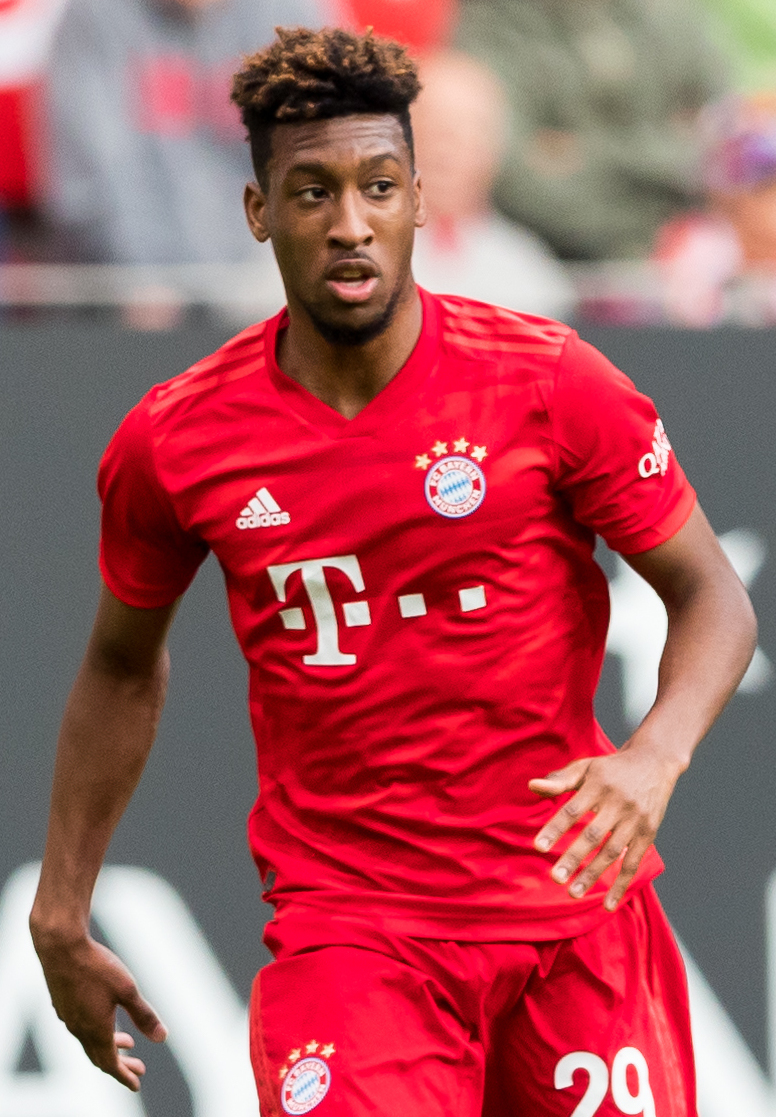
Bayern winger Kingsley Coman scored the only goal of the match in the 59th minute.

Paris Saint-Germain kicked off the match, though Bayern Munich began quickly in the opening stages, before Paris found their way into the game after 10 minutes. In the 18th minute, PSG had their first clear opportunity when Kylian Mbappé passed to Neymar on the left side of the penalty area, but his shot was blocked by the leg of Bayern goalkeeper Manuel Neuer. In the 22nd minute, Bayern forward Robert Lewandowski received the ball in the penalty area, swiveling and shooting the ball towards the goal which deflected off the inside of the left post and back into play. Two minutes later, Ángel Di María found himself with space in front of goal after a one-two with Ander Herrera, but shot the ball over the crossbar of Neuer's goal. During the sequence, Bayern defender Jérôme Boateng injured himself, and had to be replaced by Niklas Süle. Herrera had a drop-kick deflected wide of the Bayern goal in the 29th minute, while Lewandowski's 31st-minute dipping header was parried by PSG goalkeeper Keylor Navas. In the 45th minute, a misplaced pass by David Alaba in the Bayern back line fell in front of Mbappé, who played a one-two with Herrera before shooting the ball straight at Neuer when confronted by a clear opening on goal. In the following minute of first-half stoppage time, Kingsley Coman was hit on the shoulder by the arm of defender Thilo Kehrer and went down in the penalty area after cutting down the goal line. However, referee Daniele Orsato dismissed the Bayern appeals for a penalty, and blew for half-time with the match scoreless.

In the second half, Bayern scored the only goal in the 59th minute with a header by Coman, a PSG academy graduate. Thomas Müller laid a pass from Serge Gnabry back to right-back Joshua Kimmich, who crossed the ball from the right into the box towards the unmarked Coman at the far post, which was headed across the goal past Navas and into the right corner of the net. Following the goal, Bayern quickly created additional opportunities in the Parisian half, but were unable to capitalise on the chances. Bayern subsequently switched to a more defensive approach, and in the 70th minute Neuer made another save with his leg after Marquinhos found himself clear on goal following a pass from Ángel Di María into the left side of the penalty box. Three minutes later, Mbappé was caught on the back of his foot by Kimmich after cutting inside the Bayern penalty area, but referee Orsato again decided to not award a penalty. The final chance of the match came in stoppage time, when Mbappé ran down the inside-left channel and passed to Neymar on the left side of Bayern's penalty box, who turned sharply and shot wide of the far post, with substitute Eric Maxim Choupo-Moting's outstretched leg failing to meet the ball directly in front of the goal. Minutes later, the match ended as a 1–0 win for Bayern, securing the continental treble.

=== Details ===
The "home" team (for administrative purposes) was determined by an additional draw held on 10 July 2020 (after the quarter-final and semi-final draws), at the UEFA headquarters in Nyon, Switzerland.

23 August 2020
20:00 UTC+1

Paris Saint-Germain (France)	0–1	(Germany) Bayern Munich
	Report	Coman 59'

Estádio da Luz, Lisbon
Attendance: 0
Referee: Daniele Orsato (Italy)

Paris Saint-Germain	Bayern Munich

GK	1	(Costa Rica) Keylor Navas
RB	4	(Germany) Thilo Kehrer
CB	2	(Brazil) Thiago Silva (c)	(yellow card) 83'
CB	3	(France) Presnel Kimpembe
LB	14	(Spain) Juan Bernat		(substituted off) 80'
CM	21	(Spain) Ander Herrera		(substituted off) 72'
CM	5	(Brazil) Marquinhos
CM	8	(Argentina) Leandro Paredes	(yellow card) 52'	(substituted off) 65'
RF	11	(Argentina) Ángel Di María		(substituted off) 80'
CF	7	(France) Kylian Mbappé
LF	10	(Brazil) Neymar	(yellow card) 81'
Substitutes:
GK	16	(Spain) Sergio Rico
GK	30	(Poland) Marcin Bułka
DF	20	(France) Layvin Kurzawa	(yellow card) 86'	(substituted on) 80'
DF	22	(France) Abdou Diallo
DF	25	(Netherlands) Mitchel Bakker
DF	31	(France) Colin Dagba
MF	6	(Italy) Marco Verratti		(substituted on) 65'
MF	19	(Spain) Pablo Sarabia
MF	23	(Germany) Julian Draxler		(substituted on) 72'
MF	27	(Senegal) Idrissa Gueye
FW	17	(Cameroon) Eric Maxim Choupo-Moting		(substituted on) 80'
FW	18	(Argentina) Mauro Icardi
Manager:
(Germany) Thomas Tuchel

GK	1	(Germany) Manuel Neuer (c)
RB	32	(Germany) Joshua Kimmich
CB	17	(Germany) Jérôme Boateng		(substituted off) 25'
CB	27	(Austria) David Alaba
LB	19	(Canada) Alphonso Davies	(yellow card) 28'
CM	6	(Spain) Thiago		(substituted off) 86'
CM	18	(Germany) Leon Goretzka
RW	22	(Germany) Serge Gnabry	(yellow card) 52'	(substituted off) 68'
AM	25	(Germany) Thomas Müller	(yellow card) 90+4'
LW	29	(France) Kingsley Coman		(substituted off) 68'
CF	9	(Poland) Robert Lewandowski
Substitutes:
GK	26	(Germany) Sven Ulreich
GK	39	(Germany) Ron-Thorben Hoffmann
DF	2	(Spain) Álvaro Odriozola
DF	4	(Germany) Niklas Süle	(yellow card) 56'	(substituted on) 25'
DF	5	(France) Benjamin Pavard
DF	21	(France) Lucas Hernandez
MF	8	(Spain) Javi Martínez
MF	10	(Brazil) Philippe Coutinho		(substituted on) 68'
MF	11	(France) Michaël Cuisance
MF	14	(Croatia) Ivan Perišić		(substituted on) 68'
MF	24	(France) Corentin Tolisso		(substituted on) 86'
FW	35	(Netherlands) Joshua Zirkzee
Manager:
(Germany) Hansi Flick

Man of the Match:
Kingsley Coman (Bayern Munich)

Assistant referees:
Lorenzo Manganelli (Italy)
Alessandro Giallatini (Italy)
Fourth official:
Ovidiu Hațegan (Romania)
Video assistant referee:
Massimiliano Irrati (Italy)
Assistant video assistant referee:
Marco Guida (Italy)
Offside video assistant referee:
Roberto Díaz Pérez del Palomar (Spain)
Support video assistant referee:
Alejandro Hernández Hernández (Spain)

Match rules

- 90 minutes
- 30 minutes of extra time if necessary
- Penalty shoot-out if scores still level
- Twelve named substitutes
- Maximum of five substitutions, with a sixth allowed in extra time (Note: Each team was only given three opportunities to make substitutions, with a fourth opportunity in extra time, excluding substitutions made at half-time, before the start of extra time and at half-time in extra time.)

=== Statistics ===
First half
Statistic	Paris Saint-Germain	Bayern Munich
Goals scored	0	0
Total shots	6	5
Shots on target	2	1
Saves	1	2
Ball possession	38%	62%
Corner kicks	2	2
Fouls committed	8	9
Offsides	1	0
Yellow cards	0	1
Red cards	0	0

Second half
Statistic	Paris Saint-Germain	Bayern Munich
Goals scored	0	1
Total shots	3	7
Shots on target	1	1
Saves	0	1
Ball possession	40%	60%
Corner kicks	2	2
Fouls committed	8	13
Offsides	1	1
Yellow cards	4	3
Red cards	0	0

Overall
Statistic	Paris Saint-Germain	Bayern Munich
Goals scored	0	1
Total shots	9	12
Shots on target	3	2
Saves	1	3
Ball possession	39%	61%
Corner kicks	4	4
Fouls committed	16	22
Offsides	2	1
Yellow cards	4	4
Red cards	0	0

== Post-match ==
With the win, Bayern Munich secured their sixth European Cup title to draw level with Liverpool, behind only Real Madrid (15 titles) and Milan (7 titles). As Bayern also won the Bundesliga and DFB-Pokal, they secured a second continental treble after the 2012–13 season. It was the ninth treble won in Europe, with Bayern Munich only the second club to win it twice after Barcelona in 2008–09 and 2014–15.

Former Paris Saint-Germain player Kingsley Coman, who scored the winning goal for Bayern, earned the man of the match award. Bayern goalkeeper Manuel Neuer was voted as the Champions League player of the week, having made three saves during the match to keep a clean sheet. Bayern became the first club to win any European competition with a perfect winning record, emerging victorious in all 11 matches. As a result, it was also the 14th occasion a club won the Champions League unbeaten, with Bayern the 10th club to do so, and the first since Manchester United in 2007–08.

With the win, six Bayern players secured their second European Cup title, five of which were from the club's victorious 2012–13 Champions League campaign: David Alaba, Jérôme Boateng, Javi Martínez, Thomas Müller and Manuel Neuer. Therefore, these five joined eight other players who have won two European trebles: Dani Alves, Sergio Busquets, Andrés Iniesta, Lionel Messi, Pedro, Gerard Piqué and Xavi with Barcelona in 2008–09 and 2014–15, as well as Samuel Eto'o with Barcelona in 2008–09 and Inter Milan in 2009–10. Thiago was the only other Bayern player to have won the Champions League prior, doing so with Barcelona in 2010–11. Alphonso Davies became the first Canadian male international to win the Champions League.

Paris Saint-Germain's defeat meant that the past seven final debutants since the success of Borussia Dortmund in 1997 had all lost, including fellow Ligue 1 club Monaco in 2004. This also meant their arch-rival Marseille were still the only French club to ever win the European Cup, having done so in 1993. The match was the lowest-scoring Champions League final since the goalless 2003 edition between Juventus and Milan and the first final to be ended 1–0 since Real Madrid's victory over Juventus in 1998.

Following the completion of the competition, UEFA's Technical Observers named nine Bayern Munich players in the Champions League squad of the season: David Alaba, Alphonso Davies, Serge Gnabry, Leon Goretzka, Joshua Kimmich, Robert Lewandowski, Thomas Müller, Manuel Neuer and Thiago. For Paris Saint-Germain, Marquinhos, Kylian Mbappé and Neymar were included in the squad.

As the winners, Bayern also qualified to enter the group stage of the 2020–21 UEFA Champions League; however as Bayern already qualified through their league performance, the berth reserved was given to the team that was top of the abandoned 2019–20 Eredivisie (Ajax), the 11th-ranked association according to next season's access list.

Following the loss, Paris Saint-Germain fans clashed with riot police in Paris, including on the Champs-Élysées and near the Parc des Princes. Cars were ignited, buildings were attacked, and flares and fireworks were shot at police after tear gas was used to disperse fans.

The two teams met again the following season at the quarter-final stage. The scores were level at 3–3 after the two legs, but Paris Saint-Germain won on away goals.

=== Viewership ===
In France, the final was televised on TF1, and drew an average of 11.1 million viewers, making it the third most watched Champions League final ever in France, after the 1993 and 2004 finals which also involved teams from the country. The game was also shown live on RMC Sport, who did not disclose their viewing figures. In Germany, the match drew a viewership of 12.8 million, which was around 39.9% of the market share, on state-owned ZDF, and another 1.04 million viewers watching the match through pay-television broadcaster Sky Deutschland.

== See also ==
- 2020 UEFA Europa League Final
- 2020 UEFA Women's Champions League final
- 2019–20 FC Bayern Munich season
- 2019–20 Paris Saint-Germain FC season
- FC Bayern Munich in international football
- Paris Saint-Germain FC in international football
