= 2019–20 UEFA Champions League knockout phase =

Sports competition

The 2019–20 UEFA Champions League knockout phase began on 18 February with the round of 16 and ended on 23 August 2020 with the final at the Estádio da Luz in Lisbon, Portugal, to decide the champions of the 2019–20 UEFA Champions League. A total of 16 teams competed in the knockout phase.

Times are CET/CEST, (Note: CET (UTC+1) for dates up to 28 March 2020 (round of 16), and CEST (UTC+2) for dates thereafter (quarter-finals, semi-finals and final).) as listed by UEFA (local times, if different, are in parentheses).

== Qualified teams ==
The knockout phase involved the 16 teams which qualified as winners and runners-up of each of the eight groups in the group stage.

| Group | Winners (seeded in round of 16 draw) | Runners-up (unseeded in round of 16 draw) |
|---|---|---|
| A | (France) Paris Saint-Germain | (Spain) Real Madrid |
| B | (Germany) Bayern Munich | (England) Tottenham Hotspur |
| C | (England) Manchester City | (Italy) Atalanta |
| D | (Italy) Juventus | (Spain) Atlético Madrid |
| E | (England) Liverpool | (Italy) Napoli |
| F | (Spain) Barcelona | (Germany) Borussia Dortmund |
| G | (Germany) RB Leipzig | (France) Lyon |
| H | (Spain) Valencia | (England) Chelsea |

== Format ==
Each tie in the knockout phase, apart from the final, was to be played over two legs, with each team playing one leg at home. The team that scored more goals on aggregate over the two legs would advance to the next round. If the aggregate score was level, the away goals rule was applied, i.e. the team that scored more goals away from home over the two legs advanced. If away goals were also equal, then extra time was played. The away goals rule was again applied after extra time, i.e. if there were goals scored during extra time and the aggregate score was still level, the visiting team advanced by virtue of more away goals scored. If no goals were scored during extra time, the winners were decided by a penalty shoot-out. In the final, which was played as a single match, if the score was level at the end of normal time, extra time was played, followed by a penalty shoot-out if the score was still level. The mechanism of the draws for each round was as follows:

- In the draw for the round of 16, the eight group winners were seeded, and the eight group runners-up were unseeded. The seeded teams were drawn against the unseeded teams, with the seeded teams hosting the second leg. Teams from the same group or the same association could not be drawn against each other.
- In the draws for the quarter-finals onwards, there were no seedings, and teams from the same group or the same association could be drawn against each other. As the draws for the quarter-finals and semi-finals were held together before the quarter-finals were played, the identity of the quarter-final winners was not known at the time of the semi-final draw. A draw was also held to determine which semi-final winner was designated as the "home" team for the final (for administrative purposes as it was played at a neutral venue).

For the quarter-finals and semi-finals, teams from the same city were not to be scheduled to play at home on the same day or on consecutive days, due to logistics and crowd control. To avoid such scheduling conflict, if the two teams were drawn to play at home for the same leg, the order of legs of the tie involving the team which were not titleholders of Champions League or Europa League, or the team with the lower domestic ranking in the qualifying season (if neither team were continental title holder) was to be reversed from the original draw.

On 17 June 2020, UEFA announced that due to the COVID-19 pandemic in Europe, the final stages of the competition would feature a format change: the quarter-finals, semi-finals and final would be played in a single-leg format from 12 to 23 August 2020 at the Estádio da Luz and Estádio José Alvalade in Lisbon, Portugal. The matches were played behind closed doors, through the decisions of the national and local government.

Following the competition restart in August 2020, a maximum of five substitutions were allowed, with a sixth allowed in extra time. However, each team was only given three opportunities to make substitutions, with a fourth opportunity in extra time, excluding substitutions made at half-time, before the start of extra time and at half-time in extra time. This followed a proposal from FIFA and approval by IFAB to lessen the impact of fixture congestion.

== Schedule ==
The schedule was as follows (all draws were held at the UEFA headquarters in Nyon, Switzerland).

Following the first set of round of 16 second leg matches, the competition was postponed indefinitely due to the COVID-19 pandemic in Europe. The final, originally scheduled to take place on 30 May 2020, was officially postponed on 23 March 2020. A working group was set up by UEFA to decide the calendar of the remainder of the season.

| Round | Draw date | First leg | Second leg |
|---|---|---|---|
| Round of 16 | 16 December 2019, 12:00 | 18–19 & 25–26 February 2020 | 10–11 March & 7–8 August 2020 (Note: Second week of matches originally scheduled for 17–18 March 2020) |
| Quarter-finals | 10 July 2020, 12:00 (Note: The quarter-final, semi-final, and final draws were originally scheduled for 20 March 2020) | 12–15 August 2020 (Note: The quarter-final first legs were originally scheduled for 7–8 April, and second legs 14–15 April 2020) | |
| Semi-finals | 10 July 2020, 12:00 | 18–19 August 2020 (Note: The semi-final first legs were originally scheduled for 28–29 April, and second legs 5–6 May 2020) | |
| Final | 10 July 2020, 12:00 | 23 August 2020 at Estádio da Luz, Lisbon (Note: The final was originally scheduled for 30 May 2020) | |

== Bracket ==
Round of 16
(England) Tottenham Hotspur | 0 | 0 | 0
(Germany) RB Leipzig | 1 | 3 | 4
(Spain) Atlético Madrid (a.e.t.) | 1 | 3 | 4
(England) Liverpool | 0 | 2 | 2
(Italy) Atalanta | 4 | 4 | 8
(Spain) Valencia | 1 | 3 | 4
(Germany) Borussia Dortmund | 2 | 0 | 2
(France) Paris Saint-Germain | 1 | 2 | 3
(Spain) Real Madrid | 1 | 1 | 2
(England) Manchester City | 2 | 2 | 4
(France) Lyon (a) | 1 | 1 | 2
(Italy) Juventus | 0 | 2 | 2
(Italy) Napoli | 1 | 1 | 2
(Spain) Barcelona | 1 | 3 | 4
(England) Chelsea | 0 | 1 | 1
(Germany) Bayern Munich | 3 | 4 | 7

Quarter-finals
13 August – Lisbon (Alvalade)
(Germany) RB Leipzig | 2
(Spain) Atlético Madrid | 1
12 August – Lisbon (Luz)
(Italy) Atalanta | 1
(France) Paris Saint-Germain | 2
15 August – Lisbon (Alvalade)
(England) Manchester City | 1
(France) Lyon | 3
14 August – Lisbon (Luz)
(Spain) Barcelona | 2
(Germany) Bayern Munich | 8

Semi-finals
18 August – Lisbon (Luz)
(Germany) RB Leipzig | 0
(France) Paris Saint-Germain | 3
19 August – Lisbon (Alvalade)
(France) Lyon | 0
(Germany) Bayern Munich | 3

Final
23 August – Lisbon (Luz)
(France) Paris Saint-Germain | 0
(Germany) Bayern Munich | 1

== Round of 16 ==
The draw for the round of 16 was held on 16 December 2019, 12:00 CET.

=== Summary ===
The first legs were played as scheduled on 18, 19, 25 and 26 February, as were the first set of second legs on 10 and 11 March 2020. Due to concerns over the COVID-19 pandemic in Europe, the second set of second leg matches were postponed by UEFA on 13 March 2020. On 17 June 2020, UEFA announced that the second legs would be played on 7–8 August 2020, with the venue to be decided between the home team's stadium and a neutral stadium in Portugal (at the Estádio do Dragão in Porto and the Estádio D. Afonso Henriques in Guimarães). On 9 July 2020, UEFA announced that the remaining second legs would be held at the venues originally proposed.

The first leg of the Atalanta v Valencia tie was retrospectively blamed by local civic and medical authorities for contributing to the extremely high concentration of coronavirus cases in Atalanta's home city of Bergamo. Several fans and players of Valencia also had positive diagnoses after returning from the game. The second leg of the Atlético Madrid v Liverpool tie was similarly blamed for the sharp increase in coronavirus-related deaths in North West England.

| Team 1 | Agg. | Team 2 | 1st leg | 2nd leg |
|---|---|---|---|---|
| Borussia Dortmund (Germany) | 2–3 | (France) Paris Saint-Germain | 2–1 | 0–2 |
| Real Madrid (Spain) | 2–4 | (England) Manchester City | 1–2 | 1–2 |
| Atalanta (Italy) | 8–4 | (Spain) Valencia | 4–1 | 4–3 |
| Atlético Madrid (Spain) | 4–2 | (England) Liverpool | 1–0 | 3–2 (a.e.t.) |
| Chelsea (England) | 1–7 | (Germany) Bayern Munich | 0–3 | 1–4 |
| Lyon (France) | 2–2 (a) | (Italy) Juventus | 1–0 | 1–2 |
| Tottenham Hotspur (England) | 0–4 | (Germany) RB Leipzig | 0–1 | 0–3 |
| Napoli (Italy) | 2–4 | (Spain) Barcelona | 1–1 | 1–3 |

=== Matches ===
18 February 2020
21:00

| Borussia Dortmund (Germany) | 2–1 | (France) Paris Saint-Germain |
|---|---|---|
| Haaland 69', 77' | Report | Neymar 75' |

Westfalenstadion, Dortmund
Attendance: 66,099
Referee: Antonio Mateu Lahoz (Spain)
11 March 2020
21:00

| Paris Saint-Germain (France) | 2–0 | (Germany) Borussia Dortmund |
|---|---|---|
| Neymar 28'; Bernat 45+1' | Report |

Parc des Princes, Paris
Attendance: 0 (Note: The Paris Saint-Germain v Borussia Dortmund match was played behind closed doors due to the COVID-19 pandemic in France.)
Referee: Anthony Taylor (England)

Paris Saint-Germain won 3–2 on aggregate.

26 February 2020
21:00

| Real Madrid (Spain) | 1–2 | (England) Manchester City |
|---|---|---|
| Isco 60' | Report | Gabriel Jesus 78'; De Bruyne 83' (pen.) |

Santiago Bernabéu, Madrid
Attendance: 75,615
Referee: Daniele Orsato (Italy)
7 August 2020 (Note: The Manchester City v Real Madrid match, originally scheduled to be played on 17 March 2020, 21:00 CET (20:00 GMT), was postponed as the Real Madrid players were quarantined due to the COVID-19 pandemic in Spain.)
21:00 (20:00 UTC+1)

| Manchester City (England) | 2–1 | (Spain) Real Madrid |
|---|---|---|
| Sterling 9'; Gabriel Jesus 68' | Report | Benzema 28' |

City of Manchester Stadium, Manchester
Attendance: 0 (Note: The remainder of the competition, held in August 2020, was played behind closed doors due to the COVID-19 pandemic in Europe.)
Referee: Felix Brych (Germany)

Manchester City won 4–2 on aggregate.

19 February 2020
21:00

| Atalanta (Italy) | 4–1 | (Spain) Valencia |
|---|---|---|
| Hateboer 16', 62'; Iličić 42'; Freuler 57' | Report | Cheryshev 66' |

San Siro, Milan (Note: Atalanta played their round of 16 home match at San Siro, Milan, instead of their regular home stadium Stadio Atleti Azzurri d'Italia, Bergamo, which is undergoing renovation.)
Attendance: 44,236
Referee: Michael Oliver (England)
10 March 2020
21:00

| Valencia (Spain) | 3–4 | (Italy) Atalanta |
|---|---|---|
| Gameiro 21', 51'; Torres 67' | Report | Iličić 3' (pen.), 43' (pen.), 71', 82' |

Mestalla, Valencia
Attendance: 0 (Note: The Valencia v Atalanta match was played behind closed doors due to the COVID-19 pandemic in Spain.)
Referee: Ovidiu Hațegan (Romania)

Atalanta won 8–4 on aggregate.

18 February 2020
21:00

| Atlético Madrid (Spain) | 1–0 | (England) Liverpool |
|---|---|---|
| Saúl 4' | Report |

Metropolitano Stadium, Madrid
Attendance: 67,443
Referee: Szymon Marciniak (Poland)
11 March 2020
21:00 (20:00 UTC+0)

| Liverpool (England) | 2–3 (a.e.t.) | (Spain) Atlético Madrid |
|---|---|---|
| Wijnaldum 43'; Firmino 94' | Report | Llorente 97', 105+1'; Morata 120+1' |

Anfield, Liverpool
Attendance: 52,267
Referee: Danny Makkelie (Netherlands)

Atlético Madrid won 4–2 on aggregate.

25 February 2020
21:00 (20:00 UTC+0)

| Chelsea (England) | 0–3 | (Germany) Bayern Munich |
|---|---|---|
| | Report | Gnabry 51', 54'; Lewandowski 76' |

Stamford Bridge, London
Attendance: 36,761
Referee: Clément Turpin (France)
8 August 2020 (Note: The Bayern Munich v Chelsea and Barcelona v Napoli matches, originally scheduled to be played on 18 March 2020, 21:00 CET, were postponed following the suspension of UEFA competitions due to the COVID-19 pandemic in Europe.)
21:00

| Bayern Munich (Germany) | 4–1 | (England) Chelsea |
|---|---|---|
| Lewandowski 10' (pen.), 84'; Perišić 24'; Tolisso 76' | Report | Abraham 44' |

Allianz Arena, Munich
Attendance: 0
Referee: Ovidiu Hațegan (Romania)

Bayern Munich won 7–1 on aggregate.

26 February 2020
21:00

| Lyon (France) | 1–0 | (Italy) Juventus |
|---|---|---|
| Tousart 31' | Report |

Parc Olympique Lyonnais, Décines-Charpieu
Attendance: 57,335
Referee: Jesús Gil Manzano (Spain)
7 August 2020 (Note: The Juventus v Lyon match, originally scheduled to be played on 17 March 2020, 21:00 CET, was postponed as the Juventus players were quarantined due to the COVID-19 pandemic in Italy.)
21:00

| Juventus (Italy) | 2–1 | (France) Lyon |
|---|---|---|
| Ronaldo 43' (pen.), 60' | Report | Depay 12' (pen.) |

Juventus Stadium, Turin
Attendance: 0
Referee: Felix Zwayer (Germany)

2–2 on aggregate; Lyon won on away goals.

19 February 2020
21:00 (20:00 UTC+0)

| Tottenham Hotspur (England) | 0–1 | (Germany) RB Leipzig |
|---|---|---|
| | Report | Werner 58' (pen.) |

Tottenham Hotspur Stadium, London
Attendance: 60,095
Referee: Cüneyt Çakır (Turkey)
10 March 2020
21:00

| RB Leipzig (Germany) | 3–0 | (England) Tottenham Hotspur |
|---|---|---|
| Sabitzer 10', 21'; Forsberg 87' | Report |

Red Bull Arena, Leipzig
Attendance: 42,146
Referee: Carlos del Cerro Grande (Spain)

RB Leipzig won 4–0 on aggregate.

25 February 2020
21:00

| Napoli (Italy) | 1–1 | (Spain) Barcelona |
|---|---|---|
| Mertens 30' | Report | Griezmann 57' |

Stadio San Paolo, Naples
Attendance: 44,388
Referee: Felix Brych (Germany)
8 August 2020
21:00

| Barcelona (Spain) | 3–1 | (Italy) Napoli |
|---|---|---|
| Lenglet 10'; Messi 23'; Suárez 45+1' (pen.) | Report | Insigne 45+5' (pen.) |

Camp Nou, Barcelona
Attendance: 0
Referee: Cüneyt Çakır (Turkey)

Barcelona won 4–2 on aggregate.

== Quarter-finals ==
The draw for the quarter-finals took place on 10 July 2020.

=== Summary ===
The matches were played from 12 to 15 August 2020.

| Team 1 | Score | Team 2 |
|---|---|---|
| Manchester City (England) | 1–3 | (France) Lyon |
| RB Leipzig (Germany) | 2–1 | (Spain) Atlético Madrid |
| Barcelona (Spain) | 2–8 | (Germany) Bayern Munich |
| Atalanta (Italy) | 1–2 | (France) Paris Saint-Germain |

=== Matches ===
15 August 2020
21:00 (20:00 UTC+1)

| Manchester City (England) | 1–3 | (France) Lyon |
|---|---|---|
| De Bruyne 69' | Report | Cornet 24'; Dembélé 79', 87' |

Estádio José Alvalade, Lisbon
Attendance: 0
Referee: Danny Makkelie (Netherlands)

13 August 2020
21:00 (20:00 UTC+1)

| RB Leipzig (Germany) | 2–1 | (Spain) Atlético Madrid |
|---|---|---|
| Olmo 51'; Adams 88' | Report | Félix 71' (pen.) |

Estádio José Alvalade, Lisbon
Attendance: 0
Referee: Szymon Marciniak (Poland)

14 August 2020
21:00 (20:00 UTC+1)

| Barcelona (Spain) | 2–8 | (Germany) Bayern Munich |
|---|---|---|
| Alaba 7' (o.g.); Suárez 57' | Report | Müller 4', 31'; Perišić 22'; Gnabry 27'; Kimmich 63'; Lewandowski 82'; Coutinho 85', 89' |

Estádio da Luz, Lisbon
Attendance: 0
Referee: Damir Skomina (Slovenia)

12 August 2020
21:00 (20:00 UTC+1)

| Atalanta (Italy) | 1–2 | (France) Paris Saint-Germain |
|---|---|---|
| Pašalić 27' | Report | Marquinhos 90'; Choupo-Moting 90+3' |

Estádio da Luz, Lisbon
Attendance: 0
Referee: Anthony Taylor (England)

== Semi-finals ==
The draw for the semi-finals took place on 10 July 2020 (after the quarter-final draw).

For the first time since the 2006–07 season, no Spanish team managed to reach the semi-finals of the competition. It is also the first time that no English or Spanish team has managed to reach the semi-finals of the competition since the 1995–96 season, and the first time since the 1990–91 European Cup that no English, Italian or Spanish team reached the semi-finals. For the first time in competition history, two French teams managed to reach the semi-finals.

=== Summary ===
The matches were played on 18 and 19 August 2020.

| Team 1 | Score | Team 2 |
|---|---|---|
| Lyon (France) | 0–3 | (Germany) Bayern Munich |
| RB Leipzig (Germany) | 0–3 | (France) Paris Saint-Germain |

=== Matches ===
19 August 2020
21:00 (20:00 UTC+1)

| Lyon (France) | 0–3 | (Germany) Bayern Munich |
|---|---|---|
| | Report | Gnabry 18', 33'; Lewandowski 88' |

Estádio José Alvalade, Lisbon
Attendance: 0
Referee: Antonio Mateu Lahoz (Spain)

18 August 2020
21:00 (20:00 UTC+1)

| RB Leipzig (Germany) | 0–3 | (France) Paris Saint-Germain |
|---|---|---|
| | Report | Marquinhos 13'; Di María 42'; Bernat 56' |

Estádio da Luz, Lisbon
Attendance: 0
Referee: Björn Kuipers (Netherlands)

== Final ==
The final was played at the Estádio da Luz in Lisbon. The "home" team (for administrative purposes) was determined by an additional draw held after the quarter-final and semi-final draws.

23 August 2020
21:00 (20:00 UTC+1)

| Paris Saint-Germain (France) | 0–1 | (Germany) Bayern Munich |
|---|---|---|
| | Report | Coman 59' |

Estádio da Luz, Lisbon
Attendance: 0
Referee: Daniele Orsato (Italy)
