= 2019–20 UEFA Champions League group stage =

Football tournament

The 2019–20 UEFA Champions League group stage began on 17 September 2019 and ended on 11 December 2019. A total of 32 teams competed in the group stage to decide the 16 places in the knockout phase of the 2019–20 UEFA Champions League.

== Draw ==
The draw for the group stage was held on 29 August 2019, 18:00 CEST, at the Grimaldi Forum in Monaco.

The 32 teams were drawn into eight groups of four, with the restriction that teams from the same association could not be drawn against each other. For the draw, the teams were seeded into four pots based on the following principles (Regulations Article 13.06):

- Pot 1 contained the Champions League and Europa League title holders, and the champions of the top six associations based on their 2018 UEFA country coefficients. If one or both title holders were one of the champions of the top six associations, the champions of the next highest ranked association(s) were also seeded into Pot 1.
- Pot 2, 3 and 4 contained the remaining teams, seeded based on their 2019 UEFA club coefficients.

On 17 July 2014, the UEFA emergency panel ruled that Ukrainian and Russian clubs would not be drawn against each other "until further notice" due to the political unrest between the countries.

Moreover, for associations with two or more teams, teams were paired in order to split them into two sets of four groups (A–D, E–H) for maximum television coverage. The following pairings were announced by UEFA after the group stage teams were confirmed:

- (Spain) Barcelona and Real Madrid
- (Spain) Atlético Madrid and Valencia
- (England) Liverpool and Manchester City
- (England) Chelsea and Tottenham Hotspur
- (Italy) Juventus and Inter Milan
- (Italy) Napoli and Atalanta
- (Germany) Bayern Munich and Borussia Dortmund
- (Germany) Bayer Leverkusen and RB Leipzig
- (France) Paris Saint-Germain and Lyon
- (Russia) Zenit Saint Petersburg and Lokomotiv Moscow
- (Belgium) Club Brugge and Genk

On each matchday, one set of four groups played their matches on Tuesday, while the other set of four groups played their matches on Wednesday, with the two sets of groups alternating between each matchday. The fixtures were decided after the draw, using a computer draw not shown to public, with the following match sequence (Regulations Article 16.02):

Group stage schedule
Matchday	Dates	Matches (Note: Positions for scheduling did not use the seeding pots, e.g., Team 1 was not necessarily the team from Pot 1 in the draw.)
Matchday 1	17–18 September 2019	2 v 3, 4 v 1
Matchday 2	1–2 October 2019	1 v 2, 3 v 4
Matchday 3	22–23 October 2019	3 v 1, 2 v 4
Matchday 4	5–6 November 2019	1 v 3, 4 v 2
Matchday 5	26–27 November 2019	3 v 2, 1 v 4
Matchday 6	10–11 December 2019	2 v 1, 4 v 3

There were scheduling restrictions: for example, teams from the same city (e.g. Real Madrid and Atlético Madrid) in general were not scheduled to play at home on the same matchday (to avoid them playing at home on the same day or on consecutive days, due to logistics and crowd control), and teams from "winter countries" (e.g. Russia) were not scheduled to play at home on the last matchday (due to cold weather).

The draw also established the group compositions of the UEFA Champions League Path of the 2019–20 UEFA Youth League.

== Teams ==
Below were the participating teams (with their 2019 UEFA club coefficients), grouped by their seeding pot. They included:

- 26 teams which entered in this stage
- 6 winners of the play-off round (4 from Champions Path, 2 from League Path)

Key to colours
Group winners and runners-up advanced to round of 16
Third-placed teams entered Europa League round of 32

Pot 1 (by association rank)
Assoc.	Team	Notes	Coeff.
—	(England) Liverpool		91.000
—	(England) Chelsea		87.000
1	(Spain) Barcelona		138.000
2	(England) Manchester City		106.000
3	(Italy) Juventus		124.000
4	(Germany) Bayern Munich		128.000
5	(France) Paris Saint-Germain		103.000
6	(Russia) Zenit Saint Petersburg		72.000

Pot 2
Team	Notes	Coeff.
(Spain) Real Madrid		146.000
(Spain) Atlético Madrid		127.000
(Germany) Borussia Dortmund		85.000
(Italy) Napoli		80.000
(Ukraine) Shakhtar Donetsk		80.000
(England) Tottenham Hotspur		78.000
(Netherlands) Ajax		70.500
(Portugal) Benfica		68.000

Pot 3
Team	Notes	Coeff.
(France) Lyon		61.500
(Germany) Bayer Leverkusen		61.000
(Austria) Red Bull Salzburg		54.500
(Greece) Olympiacos		44.000
(Belgium) Club Brugge		39.500
(Spain) Valencia		37.000
(Italy) Inter Milan		31.000
(Croatia) Dinamo Zagreb		29.500

Pot 4
Team	Notes	Coeff.
(Russia) Lokomotiv Moscow		28.500
(Belgium) Genk		25.000
(Turkey) Galatasaray		22.500
(Germany) RB Leipzig		22.000
(Czech Republic) Slavia Prague		21.500
(Serbia) Red Star Belgrade		16.750
(Italy) Atalanta		14.945
(France) Lille		11.699

Notes

1. ^{TH} Champions League title holders, automatically placed into Pot 1 as top seed.
2. ^{EL} Europa League title holders, automatically placed into Pot 1 as second top seed.
3. ^{CP} Winners of play-off round (Champions Path).
4. ^{LP} Winners of play-off round (League Path).

== Format ==
In each group, teams played against each other home-and-away in a round-robin format. The group winners and runners-up advanced to the round of 16, while the third-placed teams entered the Europa League round of 32.

=== Tiebreakers ===
Teams were ranked according to points (3 points for a win, 1 point for a draw, 0 points for a loss), and if tied on points, the following tiebreaking criteria were applied, in the order given, to determine the rankings (Regulations Articles 17.01):

1. Points in head-to-head matches among tied teams;
2. Goal difference in head-to-head matches among tied teams;
3. Goals scored in head-to-head matches among tied teams;
4. Away goals scored in head-to-head matches among tied teams;
5. If more than two teams were tied, and after applying all head-to-head criteria above, a subset of teams were still tied, all head-to-head criteria above were reapplied exclusively to this subset of teams;
6. Goal difference in all group matches;
7. Goals scored in all group matches;
8. Away goals scored in all group matches;
9. Wins in all group matches;
10. Away wins in all group matches;
11. Disciplinary points (red card = 3 points, yellow card = 1 point, expulsion for two yellow cards in one match = 3 points);
12. UEFA club coefficient.

== Groups ==
The matchdays were 17–18 September, 1–2 October, 22–23 October, 5–6 November, 26–27 November, and 10–11 December 2019. The scheduled kickoff times were 21:00 CET/CEST, with two matches on each Tuesday and Wednesday scheduled for 18:55 CET/CEST.

Times are CET/CEST, (Note: CEST (UTC+2) for dates up to 26 October 2019 (matchdays 1–3), and CET (UTC+1) for dates thereafter (matchdays 4–6).) as listed by UEFA (local times, if different, are in parentheses).

=== Group A ===
Pos	Team	Pld	W	D	L	GF	GA	GD	Pts	Qualification	PAR	RMA	BRU	GAL
1	(France) Paris Saint-Germain	6	5	1	0	17	2	+15	16	Advance to knockout phase	—	3–0	1–0	5–0
2	(Spain) Real Madrid	6	3	2	1	14	8	+6	11	Advance to knockout phase	2–2	—	2–2	6–0
3	(Belgium) Club Brugge	6	0	3	3	4	12	−8	3	Transfer to Europa League	0–5	1–3	—	0–0
4	(Turkey) Galatasaray	6	0	2	4	1	14	−13	2		0–1	0–1	1–1	—

Source: UEFA
Rules for classification: Group stage tiebreakers
18 September 2019
18:55

Club Brugge (Belgium)	0–0	(Turkey) Galatasaray
	Report

Jan Breydel Stadium, Bruges
Attendance: 26,616
Referee: Slavko Vinčić (Slovenia)
18 September 2019
21:00

Paris Saint-Germain (France)	3–0	(Spain) Real Madrid
Di María 14', 33'; Meunier 90+1'	Report

Parc des Princes, Paris
Attendance: 46,361
Referee: Anthony Taylor (England)

1 October 2019
18:55

Real Madrid (Spain)	2–2	(Belgium) Club Brugge
Ramos 55'; Casemiro 85'	Report	Dennis 9', 39'

Santiago Bernabéu, Madrid
Attendance: 65,112
Referee: Georgi Kabakov (Bulgaria)
1 October 2019
21:00 (22:00 UTC+3)

Galatasaray (Turkey)	0–1	(France) Paris Saint-Germain
	Report	Icardi 52'

Türk Telekom Stadium, Istanbul
Attendance: 46,532
Referee: Szymon Marciniak (Poland)

22 October 2019
21:00 (22:00 UTC+3)

Galatasaray (Turkey)	0–1	(Spain) Real Madrid
	Report	Kroos 18'

Türk Telekom Stadium, Istanbul
Attendance: 48,886
Referee: Daniele Orsato (Italy)
22 October 2019
21:00

Club Brugge (Belgium)	0–5	(France) Paris Saint-Germain
	Report	Icardi 7', 63'; Mbappé 61', 79', 83'

Jan Breydel Stadium, Bruges
Attendance: 26,946
Referee: Daniel Siebert (Germany)

6 November 2019
21:00

Real Madrid (Spain)	6–0	(Turkey) Galatasaray
Rodrygo 4', 7', 90+2'; Ramos 14' (pen.); Benzema 45', 81'	Report

Santiago Bernabéu, Madrid
Attendance: 65,492
Referee: Felix Zwayer (Germany)
6 November 2019
21:00

Paris Saint-Germain (France)	1–0	(Belgium) Club Brugge
Icardi 22'	Report

Parc des Princes, Paris
Attendance: 47,418
Referee: Bobby Madden (Scotland)

26 November 2019
18:55 (20:55 UTC+3)

Galatasaray (Turkey)	1–1	(Belgium) Club Brugge
Büyük 11'	Report	Diatta 90+2'

Türk Telekom Stadium, Istanbul
Attendance: 34,500
Referee: Ivan Kružliak (Slovakia)
26 November 2019
21:00

Real Madrid (Spain)	2–2	(France) Paris Saint-Germain
Benzema 17', 79'	Report	Mbappé 81'; Sarabia 83'

Santiago Bernabéu, Madrid
Attendance: 75,534
Referee: Artur Soares Dias (Portugal)

11 December 2019
21:00

Club Brugge (Belgium)	1–3	(Spain) Real Madrid
Vanaken 55'	Report	Rodrygo 53'; Vinícius 64'; Modrić 90+1'

Jan Breydel Stadium, Bruges
Attendance: 27,308
Referee: Tobias Stieler (Germany)
11 December 2019
21:00

Paris Saint-Germain (France)	5–0	(Turkey) Galatasaray
Icardi 32'; Sarabia 35'; Neymar 46'; Mbappé 63'; Cavani 84' (pen.)	Report

Parc des Princes, Paris
Attendance: 46,509
Referee: István Kovács (Romania)

=== Group B ===
Pos	Team	Pld	W	D	L	GF	GA	GD	Pts	Qualification	BAY	TOT	OLY	RSB
1	(Germany) Bayern Munich	6	6	0	0	24	5	+19	18	Advance to knockout phase	—	3–1	2–0	3–0
2	(England) Tottenham Hotspur	6	3	1	2	18	14	+4	10	Advance to knockout phase	2–7	—	4–2	5–0
3	(Greece) Olympiacos	6	1	1	4	8	14	−6	4	Transfer to Europa League	2–3	2–2	—	1–0
4	(Serbia) Red Star Belgrade	6	1	0	5	3	20	−17	3		0–6	0–4	3–1	—

Source: UEFA
Rules for classification: Group stage tiebreakers
18 September 2019
18:55 (19:55 UTC+3)

Olympiacos (Greece)	2–2	(England) Tottenham Hotspur
Podence 44'; Valbuena 54' (pen.)	Report	Kane 26' (pen.); Lucas 30'

Karaiskakis Stadium, Piraeus
Attendance: 31,001
Referee: Gianluca Rocchi (Italy)
18 September 2019
21:00

Bayern Munich (Germany)	3–0	(Serbia) Red Star Belgrade
Coman 34'; Lewandowski 80'; Müller 90+1'	Report

Allianz Arena, Munich
Attendance: 70,000
Referee: Bobby Madden (Scotland)

1 October 2019
21:00

Red Star Belgrade (Serbia)	3–1	(Greece) Olympiacos
Vulić 62'; Milunović 87'; Boakye 90'	Report	Semedo 37'

Red Star Stadium, Belgrade
Attendance: 43,291
Referee: Benoît Bastien (France)
1 October 2019
21:00 (20:00 UTC+1)

Tottenham Hotspur (England)	2–7	(Germany) Bayern Munich
Son Heung-min 12'; Kane 61' (pen.)	Report	Kimmich 15'; Lewandowski 45', 87'; Gnabry 53', 55', 83', 88'

Tottenham Hotspur Stadium, London
Attendance: 60,127
Referee: Clément Turpin (France)

22 October 2019
21:00 (20:00 UTC+1)

Tottenham Hotspur (England)	5–0	(Serbia) Red Star Belgrade
Kane 9', 72'; Son Heung-min 16', 44'; Lamela 57'	Report

Tottenham Hotspur Stadium, London
Attendance: 51,743
Referee: Marco Guida (Italy)
22 October 2019
21:00 (22:00 UTC+3)

Olympiacos (Greece)	2–3	(Germany) Bayern Munich
El-Arabi 23'; Guilherme 79'	Report	Lewandowski 34', 62'; Tolisso 75'

Karaiskakis Stadium, Piraeus
Attendance: 31,670
Referee: Danny Makkelie (Netherlands)

6 November 2019
18:55

Bayern Munich (Germany)	2–0	(Greece) Olympiacos
Lewandowski 69'; Perišić 89'	Report

Allianz Arena, Munich
Attendance: 63,646
Referee: Paweł Raczkowski (Poland)
6 November 2019
21:00

Red Star Belgrade (Serbia)	0–4	(England) Tottenham Hotspur
	Report	Lo Celso 34'; Son Heung-min 57', 61'; Eriksen 85'

Red Star Stadium, Belgrade
Attendance: 42,381
Referee: Carlos del Cerro Grande (Spain)

26 November 2019
21:00 (20:00 UTC+0)

Tottenham Hotspur (England)	4–2	(Greece) Olympiacos
Alli 45+1'; Kane 50', 77'; Aurier 73'	Report	El-Arabi 6'; Semedo 19'

Tottenham Hotspur Stadium, London
Attendance: 57,024
Referee: Georgi Kabakov (Bulgaria)
26 November 2019
21:00

Red Star Belgrade (Serbia)	0–6	(Germany) Bayern Munich
	Report	Goretzka 14'; Lewandowski 53' (pen.), 60', 64', 68'; Tolisso 89'

Red Star Stadium, Belgrade
Attendance: 44,118
Referee: Björn Kuipers (Netherlands)

11 December 2019
21:00 (22:00 UTC+2)

Olympiacos (Greece)	1–0	(Serbia) Red Star Belgrade
El-Arabi 87' (pen.)	Report

Karaiskakis Stadium, Piraeus
Attendance: 31,898
Referee: Daniele Orsato (Italy)
11 December 2019
21:00

Bayern Munich (Germany)	3–1	(England) Tottenham Hotspur
Coman 14'; Müller 45'; Coutinho 64'	Report	Sessegnon 20'

Allianz Arena, Munich
Attendance: 66,353
Referee: Gianluca Rocchi (Italy)

=== Group C ===
Pos	Team	Pld	W	D	L	GF	GA	GD	Pts	Qualification	MCI	ATA	SHK	DZG
1	(England) Manchester City	6	4	2	0	16	4	+12	14	Advance to knockout phase	—	5–1	1–1	2–0
2	(Italy) Atalanta	6	2	1	3	8	12	−4	7	Advance to knockout phase	1–1	—	1–2	2–0
3	(Ukraine) Shakhtar Donetsk	6	1	3	2	8	13	−5	6	Transfer to Europa League	0–3	0–3	—	2–2
4	(Croatia) Dinamo Zagreb	6	1	2	3	10	13	−3	5		1–4	4–0	3–3	—

Source: UEFA
Rules for classification: Group stage tiebreakers
18 September 2019
21:00 (22:00 UTC+3)

Shakhtar Donetsk (Ukraine)	0–3	(England) Manchester City
	Report	Mahrez 24'; Gündoğan 38'; Gabriel Jesus 76'

Metalist Stadium, Kharkiv (Note: Shakhtar Donetsk played their home matches at Metalist Stadium, Kharkiv, instead of their regular stadium, the Donbas Arena in Donetsk, due to the war in Donbas.)
Attendance: 36,675
Referee: Artur Soares Dias (Portugal)
18 September 2019
21:00

Dinamo Zagreb (Croatia)	4–0	(Italy) Atalanta
Leovac 10'; Oršić 31', 42', 68'	Report

Stadion Maksimir, Zagreb
Attendance: 28,863
Referee: Jesús Gil Manzano (Spain)

1 October 2019
18:55

Atalanta (Italy)	1–2	(Ukraine) Shakhtar Donetsk
Zapata 28'	Report	Júnior Moraes 41'; Solomon 90+5'

San Siro, Milan (Note: Atalanta played their home matches at San Siro, Milan, instead of their regular stadium Stadio Atleti Azzurri d'Italia, Bergamo, which was undergoing renovation.)
Attendance: 26,022
Referee: Tobias Stieler (Germany)
1 October 2019
21:00 (20:00 UTC+1)

Manchester City (England)	2–0	(Croatia) Dinamo Zagreb
Sterling 66'; Foden 90+5'	Report

City of Manchester Stadium, Manchester
Attendance: 49,046
Referee: Serdar Gözübüyük (Netherlands)

22 October 2019
18:55 (19:55 UTC+3)

Shakhtar Donetsk (Ukraine)	2–2	(Croatia) Dinamo Zagreb
Konoplyanka 16'; Dodô 75'	Report	Olmo 25'; Oršić 60' (pen.)

Metalist Stadium, Kharkiv
Attendance: 21,526
Referee: Antonio Mateu Lahoz (Spain)
22 October 2019
21:00 (20:00 UTC+1)

Manchester City (England)	5–1	(Italy) Atalanta
Agüero 34', 38' (pen.); Sterling 58', 64', 69'	Report	Malinovskyi 28' (pen.)

City of Manchester Stadium, Manchester
Attendance: 49,308
Referee: Orel Grinfeld (Israel)

6 November 2019
21:00

Atalanta (Italy)	1–1	(England) Manchester City
Pašalić 49'	Report	Sterling 7'

San Siro, Milan
Attendance: 34,326
Referee: Aleksei Kulbakov (Belarus)
6 November 2019
21:00

Dinamo Zagreb (Croatia)	3–3	(Ukraine) Shakhtar Donetsk
Petković 25'; Ivanušec 83'; Ademi 89'	Report	Alan Patrick 13'; Júnior Moraes 90+3'; Tetê 90+8' (pen.)

Stadion Maksimir, Zagreb
Attendance: 28,316
Referee: Felix Brych (Germany)

26 November 2019
21:00 (20:00 UTC+0)

Manchester City (England)	1–1	(Ukraine) Shakhtar Donetsk
Gündoğan 56'	Report	Solomon 69'

City of Manchester Stadium, Manchester
Attendance: 52,020
Referee: Slavko Vinčić (Slovenia)
26 November 2019
21:00

Atalanta (Italy)	2–0	(Croatia) Dinamo Zagreb
Muriel 27' (pen.); Gómez 47'	Report

San Siro, Milan
Attendance: 28,365
Referee: Sergei Karasev (Russia)

11 December 2019
18:55 (19:55 UTC+2)

Shakhtar Donetsk (Ukraine)	0–3	(Italy) Atalanta
	Report	Castagne 66'; Pašalić 80'; Gosens 90+4'

Metalist Stadium, Kharkiv
Attendance: 26,536
Referee: Felix Zwayer (Germany)
11 December 2019
18:55

Dinamo Zagreb (Croatia)	1–4	(England) Manchester City
Olmo 10'	Report	Gabriel Jesus 34', 50', 54'; Foden 84'

Stadion Maksimir, Zagreb
Attendance: 29,385
Referee: Carlos del Cerro Grande (Spain)

=== Group D ===
Pos	Team	Pld	W	D	L	GF	GA	GD	Pts	Qualification	JUV	ATM	LEV	LMO
1	(Italy) Juventus	6	5	1	0	12	4	+8	16	Advance to knockout phase	—	1–0	3–0	2–1
2	(Spain) Atlético Madrid	6	3	1	2	8	5	+3	10	Advance to knockout phase	2–2	—	1–0	2–0
3	(Germany) Bayer Leverkusen	6	2	0	4	5	9	−4	6	Transfer to Europa League	0–2	2–1	—	1–2
4	(Russia) Lokomotiv Moscow	6	1	0	5	4	11	−7	3		1–2	0–2	0–2	—

Source: UEFA
Rules for classification: Group stage tiebreakers
18 September 2019
21:00

Atlético Madrid (Spain)	2–2	(Italy) Juventus
Savić 70'; Herrera 90'	Report	Cuadrado 48'; Matuidi 65'

Wanda Metropolitano, Madrid
Attendance: 66,283
Referee: Danny Makkelie (Netherlands)
18 September 2019
21:00

Bayer Leverkusen (Germany)	1–2	(Russia) Lokomotiv Moscow
Höwedes 25' (o.g.)	Report	Krychowiak 16'; Barinov 37'

BayArena, Leverkusen
Attendance: 26,592
Referee: Paweł Raczkowski (Poland)

1 October 2019
21:00 (22:00 UTC+3)

Lokomotiv Moscow (Russia)	0–2	(Spain) Atlético Madrid
	Report	Félix 48'; Partey 58'

RZD Arena, Moscow
Attendance: 27,051
Referee: Orel Grinfeld (Israel)
1 October 2019
21:00

Juventus (Italy)	3–0	(Germany) Bayer Leverkusen
Higuaín 17'; Bernardeschi 62'; Ronaldo 89'	Report

Juventus Stadium, Turin
Attendance: 34,525
Referee: Willie Collum (Scotland)

22 October 2019
18:55

Atlético Madrid (Spain)	1–0	(Germany) Bayer Leverkusen
Morata 78'	Report

Wanda Metropolitano, Madrid
Attendance: 56,776
Referee: Artur Soares Dias (Portugal)
22 October 2019
21:00

Juventus (Italy)	2–1	(Russia) Lokomotiv Moscow
Dybala 77', 79'	Report	Al. Miranchuk 30'

Juventus Stadium, Turin
Attendance: 38,547
Referee: Anastasios Sidiropoulos (Greece)

6 November 2019
18:55 (20:55 UTC+3)

Lokomotiv Moscow (Russia)	1–2	(Italy) Juventus
Al. Miranchuk 12'	Report	Ramsey 4'; Douglas Costa 90+3'

RZD Arena, Moscow
Attendance: 26,861
Referee: Ruddy Buquet (France)
6 November 2019
21:00

Bayer Leverkusen (Germany)	2–1	(Spain) Atlético Madrid
Partey 41' (o.g.); Volland 55'	Report	Morata 90+4'

BayArena, Leverkusen
Attendance: 28,160
Referee: Damir Skomina (Slovenia)

26 November 2019
18:55 (20:55 UTC+3)

Lokomotiv Moscow (Russia)	0–2	(Germany) Bayer Leverkusen
	Report	Zhemaletdinov 11' (o.g.); S. Bender 54'

RZD Arena, Moscow
Attendance: 25,757
Referee: Michael Oliver (England)
26 November 2019
21:00

Juventus (Italy)	1–0	(Spain) Atlético Madrid
Dybala 45+2'	Report

Juventus Stadium, Turin
Attendance: 40,486
Referee: Anthony Taylor (England)

11 December 2019
21:00

Atlético Madrid (Spain)	2–0	(Russia) Lokomotiv Moscow
Félix 17' (pen.); Felipe 54'	Report

Wanda Metropolitano, Madrid
Attendance: 58,426
Referee: Viktor Kassai (Hungary)
11 December 2019
21:00

Bayer Leverkusen (Germany)	0–2	(Italy) Juventus
	Report	Ronaldo 75'; Higuaín 90+2'

BayArena, Leverkusen
Attendance: 29,542
Referee: Benoît Bastien (France)

=== Group E ===
Pos	Team	Pld	W	D	L	GF	GA	GD	Pts	Qualification	LIV	NAP	SAL	GNK
1	(England) Liverpool	6	4	1	1	13	8	+5	13	Advance to knockout phase	—	1–1	4–3	2–1
2	(Italy) Napoli	6	3	3	0	11	4	+7	12	Advance to knockout phase	2–0	—	1–1	4–0
3	(Austria) Red Bull Salzburg	6	2	1	3	16	13	+3	7	Transfer to Europa League	0–2	2–3	—	6–2
4	(Belgium) Genk	6	0	1	5	5	20	−15	1		1–4	0–0	1–4	—

Source: UEFA
Rules for classification: Group stage tiebreakers
17 September 2019
21:00

Red Bull Salzburg (Austria)	6–2	(Belgium) Genk
Haaland 2', 34', 45'; Hwang Hee-chan 36'; Szoboszlai 45+2'; Ulmer 66'	Report	Lucumí 40'; Samatta 52'

Stadion Wals-Siezenheim, Wals-Siezenheim
Attendance: 29,520
Referee: Felix Zwayer (Germany)
17 September 2019
21:00

Napoli (Italy)	2–0	(England) Liverpool
Mertens 82' (pen.); Llorente 90+2'	Report

Stadio San Paolo, Naples
Attendance: 38,878
Referee: Felix Brych (Germany)

2 October 2019
18:55

Genk (Belgium)	0–0	(Italy) Napoli
	Report

Luminus Arena, Genk
Attendance: 19,962
Referee: István Kovács (Romania)
2 October 2019
21:00 (20:00 UTC+1)

Liverpool (England)	4–3	(Austria) Red Bull Salzburg
Mané 9'; Robertson 25'; Salah 36', 69'	Report	Hwang Hee-chan 39'; Minamino 56'; Haaland 60'

Anfield, Liverpool
Attendance: 52,243
Referee: Andreas Ekberg (Sweden)

23 October 2019
21:00

Genk (Belgium)	1–4	(England) Liverpool
Odey 88'	Report	Oxlade-Chamberlain 2', 57'; Mané 77'; Salah 87'

Luminus Arena, Genk
Attendance: 19,626
Referee: Slavko Vinčić (Slovenia)
23 October 2019
21:00

Red Bull Salzburg (Austria)	2–3	(Italy) Napoli
Haaland 40' (pen.), 72'	Report	Mertens 17', 64'; Insigne 73'

Stadion Wals-Siezenheim, Wals-Siezenheim
Attendance: 29,520
Referee: Clément Turpin (France)

5 November 2019
21:00 (20:00 UTC+0)

Liverpool (England)	2–1	(Belgium) Genk
Wijnaldum 14'; Oxlade-Chamberlain 53'	Report	Samatta 41'

Anfield, Liverpool
Attendance: 52,611
Referee: Ivan Kružliak (Slovakia)
5 November 2019
21:00

Napoli (Italy)	1–1	(Austria) Red Bull Salzburg
Lozano 44'	Report	Haaland 11' (pen.)

Stadio San Paolo, Naples
Attendance: 32,862
Referee: Szymon Marciniak (Poland)

27 November 2019
21:00

Genk (Belgium)	1–4	(Austria) Red Bull Salzburg
Samatta 85'	Report	Daka 43'; Minamino 45'; Hwang Hee-chan 69'; Haaland 87'

Luminus Arena, Genk
Attendance: 17,284
Referee: Mattias Gestranius (Finland)
27 November 2019
21:00 (20:00 UTC+0)

Liverpool (England)	1–1	(Italy) Napoli
Lovren 65'	Report	Mertens 21'

Anfield, Liverpool
Attendance: 52,128
Referee: Carlos del Cerro Grande (Spain)

10 December 2019
18:55

Red Bull Salzburg (Austria)	0–2	(England) Liverpool
	Report	Keïta 57'; Salah 58'

Stadion Wals-Siezenheim, Wals-Siezenheim
Attendance: 29,520
Referee: Danny Makkelie (Netherlands)
10 December 2019
18:55

Napoli (Italy)	4–0	(Belgium) Genk
Milik 3', 26', 38' (pen.); Mertens 75' (pen.)	Report

Stadio San Paolo, Naples
Attendance: 22,265
Referee: Cüneyt Çakır (Turkey)

=== Group F ===
Pos	Team	Pld	W	D	L	GF	GA	GD	Pts	Qualification	BAR	DOR	INT	SLP
1	(Spain) Barcelona	6	4	2	0	9	4	+5	14	Advance to knockout phase	—	3–1	2–1	0–0
2	(Germany) Borussia Dortmund	6	3	1	2	8	8	0	10	Advance to knockout phase	0–0	—	3–2	2–1
3	(Italy) Inter Milan	6	2	1	3	10	9	+1	7	Transfer to Europa League	1–2	2–0	—	1–1
4	(Czech Republic) Slavia Prague	6	0	2	4	4	10	−6	2		1–2	0–2	1–3	—

Source: UEFA
Rules for classification: Group stage tiebreakers
17 September 2019
18:55

Inter Milan (Italy)	1–1	(Czech Republic) Slavia Prague
Barella 90+2'	Report	Olayinka 63'

San Siro, Milan
Attendance: 50,128
Referee: Ruddy Buquet (France)
17 September 2019
21:00

Borussia Dortmund (Germany)	0–0	(Spain) Barcelona
	Report

Westfalenstadion, Dortmund
Attendance: 66,099
Referee: Ovidiu Hațegan (Romania)

2 October 2019
18:55

Slavia Prague (Czech Republic)	0–2	(Germany) Borussia Dortmund
	Report	Hakimi 35', 89'

Sinobo Stadium, Prague
Attendance: 19,370
Referee: Björn Kuipers (Netherlands)
2 October 2019
21:00

Barcelona (Spain)	2–1	(Italy) Inter Milan
Suárez 58', 84'	Report	Martínez 3'

Camp Nou, Barcelona
Attendance: 86,141
Referee: Damir Skomina (Slovenia)

23 October 2019
21:00

Slavia Prague (Czech Republic)	1–2	(Spain) Barcelona
Bořil 50'	Report	Messi 3'; Olayinka 57' (o.g.)

Sinobo Stadium, Prague
Attendance: 19,170
Referee: Bobby Madden (Scotland)
23 October 2019
21:00

Inter Milan (Italy)	2–0	(Germany) Borussia Dortmund
Martínez 22'; Candreva 89'	Report

San Siro, Milan
Attendance: 65,673
Referee: Anthony Taylor (England)

5 November 2019
18:55

Barcelona (Spain)	0–0	(Czech Republic) Slavia Prague
	Report

Camp Nou, Barcelona
Attendance: 67,023
Referee: Michael Oliver (England)
5 November 2019
21:00

Borussia Dortmund (Germany)	3–2	(Italy) Inter Milan
Hakimi 51', 77'; Brandt 64'	Report	Martínez 5'; Vecino 40'

Signal Iduna Park, Dortmund
Attendance: 66,099
Referee: Danny Makkelie (Netherlands)

27 November 2019
21:00

Slavia Prague (Czech Republic)	1–3	(Italy) Inter Milan
Souček 37' (pen.)	Report	Martínez 19', 88'; Lukaku 81'

Sinobo Stadium, Prague
Attendance: 19,370
Referee: Szymon Marciniak (Poland)
27 November 2019
21:00

Barcelona (Spain)	3–1	(Germany) Borussia Dortmund
Suárez 29'; Messi 33'; Griezmann 67'	Report	Sancho 77'

Camp Nou, Barcelona
Attendance: 92,071
Referee: Clément Turpin (France)

10 December 2019
21:00

Inter Milan (Italy)	1–2	(Spain) Barcelona
Lukaku 44'	Report	Pérez 23'; Fati 86'

San Siro, Milan
Attendance: 71,818
Referee: Björn Kuipers (Netherlands)
10 December 2019
21:00

Borussia Dortmund (Germany)	2–1	(Czech Republic) Slavia Prague
Sancho 10'; Brandt 61'	Report	Souček 43'

Westfalenstadion, Dortmund
Attendance: 65,079
Referee: Sergei Karasev (Russia)

=== Group G ===
Pos	Team	Pld	W	D	L	GF	GA	GD	Pts	Qualification	RBL	LYO	BEN	ZEN
1	(Germany) RB Leipzig	6	3	2	1	10	8	+2	11	Advance to knockout phase	—	0–2	2–2	2–1
2	(France) Lyon	6	2	2	2	9	8	+1	8	Advance to knockout phase	2–2	—	3–1	1–1
3	(Portugal) Benfica	6	2	1	3	10	11	−1	7 (Note: Tied on head-to-head points (3). Head-to-head goal difference: Benfica +1, Zenit Saint Petersburg −1.)	Transfer to Europa League	1–2	2–1	—	3–0
4	(Russia) Zenit Saint Petersburg	6	2	1	3	7	9	−2	7		0–2	2–0	3–1	—

Source: UEFA
Rules for classification: Group stage tiebreakers
Notes:
17 September 2019
18:55

Lyon (France)	1–1	(Russia) Zenit Saint Petersburg
Depay 51' (pen.)	Report	Azmoun 41'

Parc Olympique Lyonnais, Décines-Charpieu
Attendance: 47,201
Referee: Michael Oliver (England)
17 September 2019
21:00 (20:00 UTC+1)

Benfica (Portugal)	1–2	(Germany) RB Leipzig
Seferovic 84'	Report	Werner 69', 78'

Estádio da Luz, Lisbon
Attendance: 46,460
Referee: Anastasios Sidiropoulos (Greece)

2 October 2019
21:00 (22:00 UTC+3)

Zenit Saint Petersburg (Russia)	3–1	(Portugal) Benfica
Dzyuba 22'; Dias 70' (o.g.); Azmoun 78'	Report	De Tomás 85'

Gazprom Arena, Saint Petersburg
Attendance: 51,683
Referee: Carlos del Cerro Grande (Spain)
2 October 2019
21:00

RB Leipzig (Germany)	0–2	(France) Lyon
	Report	Depay 11'; Terrier 65'

Red Bull Arena, Leipzig
Attendance: 40,194
Referee: Antonio Mateu Lahoz (Spain)

23 October 2019
18:55

RB Leipzig (Germany)	2–1	(Russia) Zenit Saint Petersburg
Laimer 49'; Sabitzer 59'	Report	Rakitskiy 25'

Red Bull Arena, Leipzig
Attendance: 41,058
Referee: Ali Palabıyık (Turkey)
23 October 2019
21:00 (20:00 UTC+1)

Benfica (Portugal)	2–1	(France) Lyon
Silva 4'; Pizzi 86'	Report	Depay 70'

Estádio da Luz, Lisbon
Attendance: 53,035
Referee: Ivan Kružliak (Slovakia)

5 November 2019
18:55 (20:55 UTC+3)

Zenit Saint Petersburg (Russia)	0–2	(Germany) RB Leipzig
	Report	Demme 45+5'; Sabitzer 63'

Krestovsky Stadium, Saint Petersburg
Attendance: 50,452
Referee: Orel Grinfeld (Israel)
5 November 2019
21:00

Lyon (France)	3–1	(Portugal) Benfica
Andersen 4'; Depay 33'; Traoré 89'	Report	Seferovic 76'

Parc Olympique Lyonnais, Décines-Charpieu
Attendance: 51,077
Referee: Björn Kuipers (Netherlands)

27 November 2019
18:55 (20:55 UTC+3)

Zenit Saint Petersburg (Russia)	2–0	(France) Lyon
Dzyuba 42'; Ozdoyev 84'	Report

Krestovsky Stadium, Saint Petersburg
Attendance: 51,183
Referee: Daniele Orsato (Italy)
27 November 2019
21:00

RB Leipzig (Germany)	2–2	(Portugal) Benfica
Forsberg 90' (pen.), 90+6'	Report	Pizzi 20'; Carlos Vinícius 59'

Red Bull Arena, Leipzig
Attendance: 38,339
Referee: Jesús Gil Manzano (Spain)

10 December 2019
21:00 (20:00 UTC+0)

Benfica (Portugal)	3–0	(Russia) Zenit Saint Petersburg
Cervi 47'; Pizzi 58' (pen.); Azmoun 79' (o.g.)	Report

Estádio da Luz, Lisbon
Attendance: 40,232
Referee: Antonio Mateu Lahoz (Spain)
10 December 2019
21:00

Lyon (France)	2–2	(Germany) RB Leipzig
Aouar 50'; Depay 82'	Report	Forsberg 9' (pen.); Werner 33' (pen.)

Parc Olympique Lyonnais, Décines-Charpieu
Attendance: 53,288
Referee: Anthony Taylor (England)

=== Group H ===
Pos	Team	Pld	W	D	L	GF	GA	GD	Pts	Qualification	VAL	CHE	AJX	LIL
1	(Spain) Valencia	6	3	2	1	9	7	+2	11 (Note: Head-to-head points: Valencia 4, Chelsea 1.)	Advance to knockout phase	—	2–2	0–3	4–1
2	(England) Chelsea	6	3	2	1	11	9	+2	11	Advance to knockout phase	0–1	—	4–4	2–1
3	(Netherlands) Ajax	6	3	1	2	12	6	+6	10	Transfer to Europa League	0–1	0–1	—	3–0
4	(France) Lille	6	0	1	5	4	14	−10	1		1–1	1–2	0–2	—

Source: UEFA
Rules for classification: Group stage tiebreakers
Notes:
17 September 2019
21:00

Ajax (Netherlands)	3–0	(France) Lille
Promes 18'; Álvarez 50'; Tagliafico 62'	Report

Johan Cruyff Arena, Amsterdam
Attendance: 51,441
Referee: Srđan Jovanović (Serbia)
17 September 2019
21:00 (20:00 UTC+1)

Chelsea (England)	0–1	(Spain) Valencia
	Report	Rodrigo 74'

Stamford Bridge, London
Attendance: 39,469
Referee: Cüneyt Çakır (Turkey)

2 October 2019
21:00

Valencia (Spain)	0–3	(Netherlands) Ajax
	Report	Ziyech 8'; Promes 34'; Van de Beek 67'

Mestalla, Valencia
Attendance: 44,659
Referee: Daniele Orsato (Italy)
2 October 2019
21:00

Lille (France)	1–2	(England) Chelsea
Osimhen 33'	Report	Abraham 22'; Willian 78'

Stade Pierre-Mauroy, Villeneuve-d'Ascq
Attendance: 48,523
Referee: Aleksei Kulbakov (Belarus)

23 October 2019
18:55

Ajax (Netherlands)	0–1	(England) Chelsea
	Report	Batshuayi 86'

Johan Cruyff Arena, Amsterdam
Attendance: 52,482
Referee: Ovidiu Hațegan (Romania)
23 October 2019
21:00

Lille (France)	1–1	(Spain) Valencia
Ikoné 90+5'	Report	Cheryshev 63'

Stade Pierre-Mauroy, Villeneuve-d'Ascq
Attendance: 47,488
Referee: Deniz Aytekin (Germany)

5 November 2019
21:00

Valencia (Spain)	4–1	(France) Lille
Parejo 66' (pen.); Soumaoro 82' (o.g.); Kondogbia 84'; Torres 90'	Report	Osimhen 25'

Mestalla, Valencia
Attendance: 38,252
Referee: Sergei Karasev (Russia)
5 November 2019
21:00 (20:00 UTC+0)

Chelsea (England)	4–4	(Netherlands) Ajax
Jorginho 5' (pen.), 71' (pen.); Azpilicueta 63'; James 74'	Report	Abraham 2' (o.g.); Promes 20'; Arrizabalaga 35' (o.g.); Van de Beek 55'

Stamford Bridge, London
Attendance: 39,132
Referee: Gianluca Rocchi (Italy)

27 November 2019
18:55

Valencia (Spain)	2–2	(England) Chelsea
Soler 40'; Wass 82'	Report	Kovačić 41'; Pulisic 50'

Mestalla, Valencia
Attendance: 43,486
Referee: Felix Zwayer (Germany)
27 November 2019
21:00

Lille (France)	0–2	(Netherlands) Ajax
	Report	Ziyech 2'; Promes 59'

Stade Pierre-Mauroy, Villeneuve-d'Ascq
Attendance: 48,612
Referee: Felix Brych (Germany)

10 December 2019
21:00

Ajax (Netherlands)	0–1	(Spain) Valencia
	Report	Rodrigo 24'

Johan Cruyff Arena, Amsterdam
Attendance: 51,931
Referee: Clément Turpin (France)
10 December 2019
21:00 (20:00 UTC+0)

Chelsea (England)	2–1	(France) Lille
Abraham 19'; Azpilicueta 35'	Report	Rémy 78'

Stamford Bridge, London
Attendance: 40,016
Referee: Anastasios Sidiropoulos (Greece)
