= FC Barcelona 2–8 FC Bayern Munich =

European football match

Barcelona v Bayern Munich (2020)
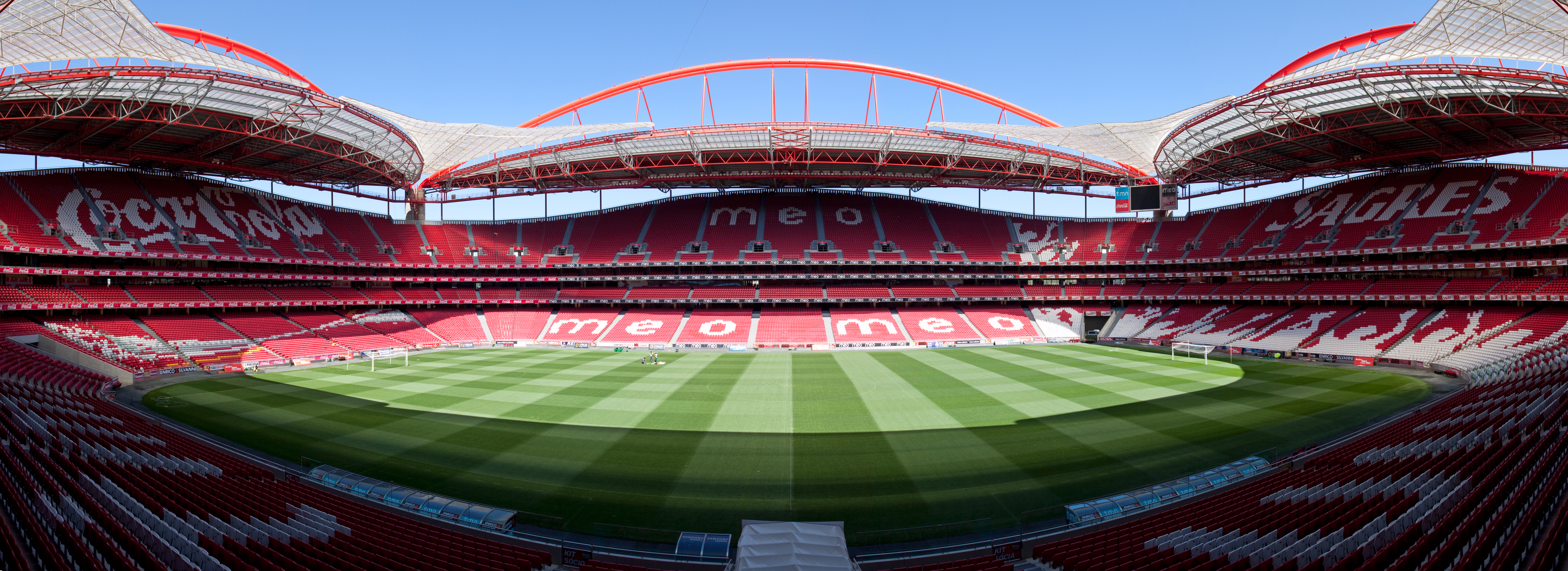
- The Estádio da Luz in Lisbon hosted the match
- Event: 2019–20 UEFA Champions League; Quarter-finals
Barcelona	Bayern Munich
(Spain)	(Germany)
2	8
- Date: 14 August 2020
- Venue: Estádio da Luz, Lisbon
- Man of the Match: Thomas Müller (Bayern Munich)
- Referee: Damir Skomina (Slovenia)
- Attendance: 0 (Note: The remainder of the competition, held in August 2020, was played behind closed doors due to the COVID-19 pandemic in Europe.)
- Weather: Clear night 24 °C (75 °F); 54% humidity

FC Barcelona 2 – 8 FC Bayern Munich was the 2019–20 UEFA Champions League quarter-final match between Barcelona and Bayern Munich played on 14 August 2020 at the Estádio da Luz in Lisbon, Portugal. Bayern, who later went on to win the competition, defeated Barcelona 8–2. It marked the first time the club had conceded eight goals in a game since 1946, when they lost 8–0 to Sevilla in the 1946 Copa del Generalísimo. This was also only the second occasion in history that Barcelona conceded more than 4 goals in one game in European competitions since their 5–4 loss to Levski Sofia in the 1975–76 UEFA Cup quarter-final.

Due to the COVID-19 pandemic in Europe, the match was played behind closed doors.

== Background ==
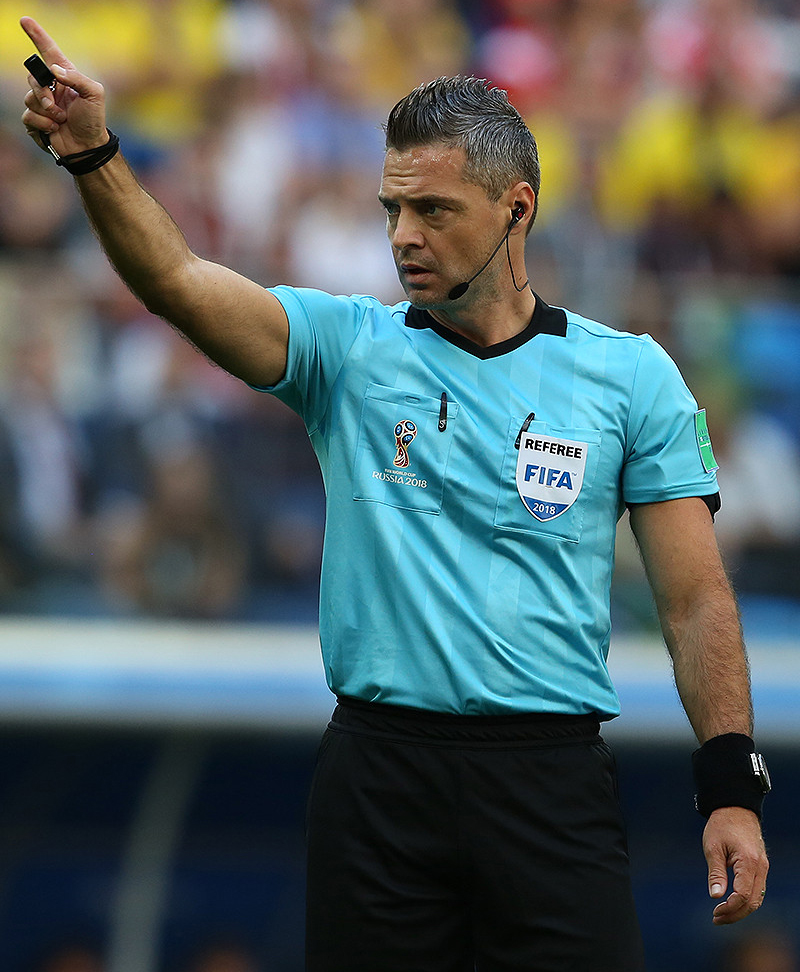
Slovenian referee Damir Skomina officiated the match.

In the 1998–99 UEFA Champions League group stage, Bayern defeated Barcelona in both matches, 1–0 at home and 2–1 away en route to Bayern topping Group D while Barcelona finished third and failed to reach the knockout stage.

Bayern and Barcelona had met in four knockout ties since 2008–09 UEFA Champions League, which yielded 26 goals prior to this game. Each time the eventual winner of the Bayern-Barcelona knockout tie went on not only to win the UEFA Champions League, but also complete the continental treble, which also occurred in 2009, 2013 and 2015.

Barcelona won 5–1 on aggregate in the quarter-finals of 2008–09 edition. Barcelona's 4–0 win at Camp Nou in the first leg, with all goals scored in the first half, led Bayern Munich president Franz Beckenbauer to remark "What I saw in the first half is, without doubt, the worst football in Bayern's history". Barcelona manager Pep Guardiola was sent off in the first leg for protesting a yellow card given to Lionel Messi, and had to watch the second leg from the stands. This defeat, as well as 0–1 home loss in a Bundesliga match against Schalke 04, eventually led to the sacking of Bayern manager Jürgen Klinsmann.

The semi-finals of the 2012–13 competition saw Arjen Robben and Thomas Müller inspire Bayern to a 7–0 aggregate victory, to become the biggest win of the semi-finals on aggregate, including a 3–0 win at the Camp Nou which was Barcelona's last home defeat in European competition until a 3–0 loss on 8 December 2020 to Juventus.

The 2014–15 UEFA Champions League semi-finals saw Lionel Messi and Neymar as the key players in a 5–3 aggregate win over Bayern, a 3–0 win at the Camp Nou and then a 3–2 defeat at the Allianz Arena. Bayern's manager at the time was Pep Guardiola, who had previously managed Barcelona from 2008 to 2012.

== Road to the quarter-final meeting ==
Both teams qualified for the knockout phase as winners of their respective groups. Both teams had also changed their coaches during the season, Bayern replaced Niko Kovač with Hansi Flick in November 2019, while Barcelona replaced Ernesto Valverde with Quique Setién in January 2020. Barcelona had faced Borussia Dortmund, Inter Milan and Slavia Prague; while Bayern, who faced Tottenham Hotspur, Olympiacos and Red Star Belgrade, won all six of their group matches, including an emphatic 7–2 win at the Tottenham Hotspur Stadium, scoring 24 goals and conceding just five. Barcelona faced Napoli in the round of 16 and won 4–2 on aggregate; while Bayern Munich beat Chelsea 7–1 on aggregate, with the second leg matches of both teams played behind closed doors due to the impact of the COVID-19 pandemic.

== Match ==
=== Summary ===
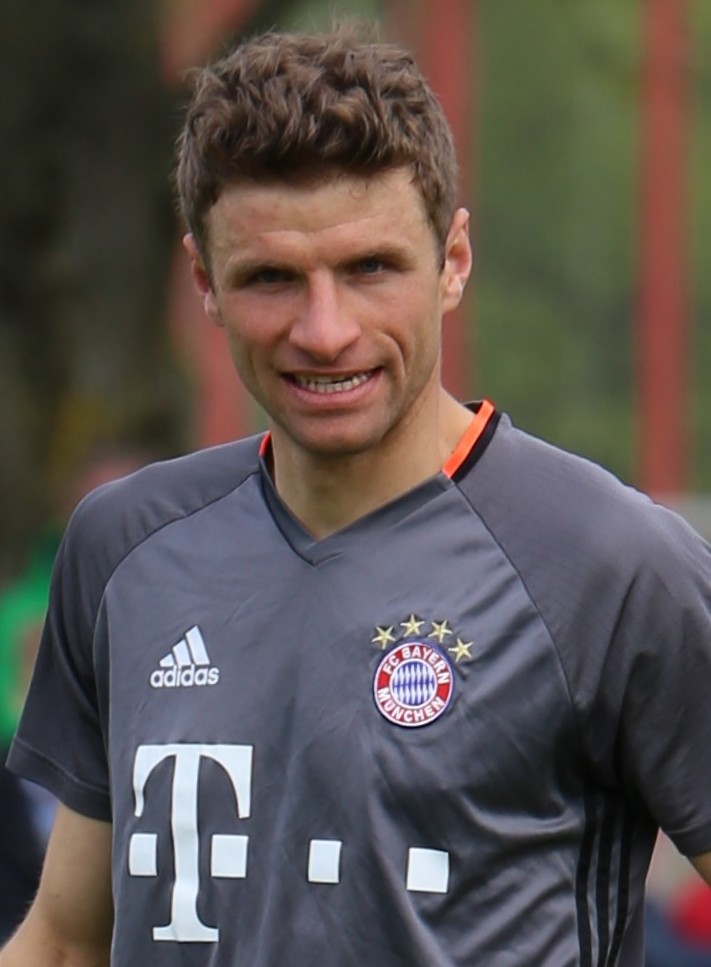
Thomas Müller won the Man of the Match award.

The fixture was played on the 14th of August, 2020 at the Estádio da Luz in Lisbon, Portugal. It was part of a single-elimination tournament, following UEFA's decision to complete the 2019–20 UEFA Champions League and 2019–20 UEFA Europa League seasons, which had been halted since March due to the COVID-19 pandemic, at neutral venues. In the opening 10 minutes, Thomas Müller fired Bayern Munich ahead following a one-two with Robert Lewandowski. Shortly after, David Alaba sliced a cross from Jordi Alba into his own net – with an unsuccessful save attempt from Manuel Neuer – to level the scores. Barcelona themselves missed two opportunities: Luis Suárez was denied by Neuer and Lionel Messi hit the post with a curling cross-shot. The following minutes took the match away from Barcelona, as Ivan Perišić kicked in a deflected shot in the 21st minute for Bayern, fed by a pass from Serge Gnabry, after a passing error from Sergi Roberto. Gnabry then scored with a half volley straight shot from a chip through-ball by Leon Goretzka in the 27th minute, and Müller quickly added the fourth four minutes later from a cross by Joshua Kimmich.

In the 57th minute, a neat turn and finish from the centre of the box to the bottom-right corner by Suárez gave the Spanish side a glimmer of hope, but that proved premature, as Kimmich's side-footed finish in the 63rd minute, connecting with a delivery from Alphonso Davies – who had beaten his marker, Nélson Semedo, at the edge of the box – made the scoreline 5–2 to the Germans. Bayern scored three goals in the closing 10 minutes of the match as in-form striker Lewandowski, who had been quiet for most of the second half, headed his 14th goal of the campaign from a close-range cross by Philippe Coutinho in the 82nd minute. Then Coutinho, who was on loan to Bayern from Barcelona, made the scoreline 8–2 in the final moments of the match: first by taking advantage of a pass from Müller in the 85th minute with a right-footed shot from the centre of the box to the bottom-left corner, followed by a left-footed shot from very close range to the bottom-left corner from a headed pass by substitute Lucas Hernandez in the 89th minute.

=== Details ===
14 August 2020
20:00 UTC+1

Barcelona (Spain)	2–8	(Germany) Bayern Munich
Alaba 7' (o.g.); Suárez 57'	Report	Müller 4', 31'; Perišić 22'; Gnabry 27'; Kimmich 63'; Lewandowski 82'; Coutinho 85', 89'

Estádio da Luz, Lisbon
Attendance: 0
Referee: Damir Skomina (Slovenia)

Barcelona	Bayern Munich

GK	1	(Germany) Marc-André ter Stegen
RB	2	(Portugal) Nélson Semedo
CB	3	(Spain) Gerard Piqué
CB	15	(France) Clément Lenglet
LB	18	(Spain) Jordi Alba	(yellow card) 58'
CM	20	(Spain) Sergi Roberto		(substituted off) 46'
CM	5	(Spain) Sergio Busquets		(substituted off) 70'
CM	21	(Netherlands) Frenkie de Jong
AM	22	(Chile) Arturo Vidal	(yellow card) 90+2'
CF	10	(Argentina) Lionel Messi (c)
CF	9	(Uruguay) Luis Suárez	(yellow card) 54'
Substitutes:
GK	13	(Brazil) Neto
GK	26	(Spain) Iñaki Peña
DF	24	(Spain) Junior Firpo
DF	33	(Uruguay) Ronald Araújo
DF	44	(Spain) Óscar Mingueza
MF	4	(Croatia) Ivan Rakitić
MF	28	(Spain) Riqui Puig
MF	42	(Spain) Monchu
MF	46	(Netherlands) Ludovit Reis
FW	11	(France) Ousmane Dembélé
FW	17	(France) Antoine Griezmann		(substituted on) 46'
FW	31	(Spain) Ansu Fati		(substituted on) 70'
Manager:
(Spain) Quique Setién

GK	1	(Germany) Manuel Neuer (c)
RB	32	(Germany) Joshua Kimmich	(yellow card) 85'
CB	17	(Germany) Jérôme Boateng	(yellow card) 43'	(substituted off) 76'
CB	27	(Austria) David Alaba
LB	19	(Canada) Alphonso Davies	(yellow card) 52'	(substituted off) 83'
CM	18	(Germany) Leon Goretzka		(substituted off) 83'
CM	6	(Spain) Thiago
RW	22	(Germany) Serge Gnabry		(substituted off) 76'
AM	25	(Germany) Thomas Müller
LW	14	(Croatia) Ivan Perišić		(substituted off) 67'
CF	9	(Poland) Robert Lewandowski
Substitutes:
GK	26	(Germany) Sven Ulreich
GK	39	(Germany) Ron-Thorben Hoffmann
DF	2	(Spain) Álvaro Odriozola
DF	4	(Germany) Niklas Süle		(substituted on) 76'
DF	21	(France) Lucas Hernandez		(substituted on) 83'
MF	8	(Spain) Javi Martínez
MF	11	(France) Michaël Cuisance
MF	24	(France) Corentin Tolisso		(substituted on) 83'
MF	42	(England) Jamal Musiala
FW	10	(Brazil) Philippe Coutinho		(substituted on) 76'
FW	29	(France) Kingsley Coman		(substituted on) 67'
FW	35	(Netherlands) Joshua Zirkzee
Other disciplinary actions:
TS	(Bosnia and Herzegovina) Hasan Salihamidžić		(yellow card) 61'
Manager:
(Germany) Hansi Flick

Man of the Match:
Thomas Müller (Bayern Munich)

Assistant referees:
Jure Praprotnik (Slovenia)
Robert Vukan (Slovenia)
Fourth official:
Artur Soares Dias (Portugal)
Video assistant referee:
Massimiliano Irrati (Italy)
Assistant video assistant referee:
Marco Guida (Italy)

Match rules

- 90 minutes
- 30 minutes of extra time if necessary
- Penalty shoot-out if scores still level
- Twelve named substitutes
- Maximum of five substitutions, with a sixth allowed in extra time (Note: Each team was only given three opportunities to make substitutions, with a fourth opportunity in extra time, excluding substitutions made at half-time, before the start of extra time and at half-time in extra time.)

=== Statistics ===
First half
Statistic	Barcelona	Bayern Munich
Goals scored	1	4
Total shots	4	14
Shots on target	3	7
Saves	3	3
Ball possession	52%	48%
Corner kicks	4	6
Fouls committed	3	12
Offsides	2	1
Yellow cards	0	1
Red cards	0	0

Second half
Statistic	Barcelona	Bayern Munich
Goals scored	1	4
Total shots	3	12
Shots on target	2	6
Saves	2	1
Ball possession	47%	53%
Corner kicks	2	3
Fouls committed	10	10
Offsides	2	1
Yellow cards	3	2
Red cards	0	0

Overall
Statistic	Barcelona	Bayern Munich
Goals scored	2	8
Total shots	7	26
Shots on target	5	13
Saves	5	4
Ball possession	49%	51%
Corner kicks	6	9
Fouls committed	13	22
Offsides	4	2
Yellow cards	3	3
Red cards	0	0

== Aftermath ==
Barcelona suffered their heaviest loss in 69 years; this was the first time they had conceded more than five goals in a UEFA Champions League game, and their worst concession since the 8–0 defeat to Sevilla in the round of 16 of the 1946 Copa del Generalísimo. Bayern Munich, on the other hand, continued their run of winning all UEFA Champions League matches they played in the season, and would go on to lift the title. The eight goals Bayern scored was the most a side had scored in a European Cup knockout match since Real Madrid defeated FC Swarovski Tirol 9–1 in the last 16 tie in 1990.

Bayern striker Robert Lewandowski became the first player to score in eight or more consecutive UEFA Champions League matches since Cristiano Ronaldo in April 2018 (eleven games), while Bayern's coach Hansi Flick became only the third manager in Champions League history to win his first six matches in charge, after Fabio Capello in 1992–93 and Luis Fernández in 1994–95. The match was also compared to the 2014 FIFA World Cup semi-final match between Brazil and Germany as Thomas Müller opened the scoring in the 7–1 routing of Brazil, which Jérôme Boateng and Manuel Neuer also took part in. Flick had been the assistant coach of Germany in that match as well.

Barcelona defender Gerard Piqué stated that the club needed structural changes on all levels, while club president Josep Maria Bartomeu described it as a "disaster". Three days after the game, Barcelona sacked manager Quique Setién. He was followed the next day by the club's sporting director Eric Abidal. Setién was replaced on 19 August by Ronald Koeman, who had played for the club from 1989 to 1995 and was their assistant manager under Louis van Gaal from 1998 to 2000.

Partly owing to this heavy defeat, Barcelona captain Lionel Messi demanded to leave Barcelona, explained his decision owed to the club's failing to compete for the Champions League title after three previous debacles in the competition (0–3 against Juventus in 2016–17 quarter-finals, 0–3 against Roma in 2017–18 quarter-finals, and 0–4 against Liverpool in 2018–19 semi-finals), by saying: "I looked further afield and I want to compete at the highest level, win titles, compete in the Champions League. You can win or lose in it, because it is very difficult, but you have to compete. At least compete for it and let us not fall apart in Rome, Liverpool and Lisbon. All that led me to think about that decision that I wanted to carry out." Although Messi ended up staying in the summer, the defeat proved to be the final involvement that Ivan Rakitić, Nélson Semedo, Luis Suárez and Arturo Vidal would have with the club, as all four players departed Barcelona during the following transfer window.

Bayern Munich went on to win their sixth title in the competition, overtaking Barcelona's total, following a 3–0 win over Lyon in the semi-finals and a 1–0 victory against Paris Saint-Germain in the final. This win would also secure the club's second continental treble, becoming only the second European side – after Barcelona themselves – to achieve this feat on multiple occasions.

Both teams would meet each other again twice later, first as part of the 2021–22 UEFA Champions League group stage, which saw Bayern Munich emerge victorious again with a 3–0 score in both matches, the second of which ultimately sent Barcelona to the UEFA Europa League for the first time in seventeen years, which further aggravated the perception of a crisis occurring within the team. Marca pointed that Barcelona's relegation to the Europa League was the culmination of "a glorious cycle that was coming to an end," after the team had suffered a total of ten losses by at least a three-goal margin since 2017, calling the 2–8 defeat to Bayern "the worst."

Both the teams went on to meet once again in the 2021-22 UEFA Champions League group stage. Bayern Munich won both games against Barcelona 3-0, as Barcelona finished 3rd in their group and played in the Europa League for the first time since 2003-04. The two teams would meet again in the 2022–23 UEFA Champions League group stage. Barcelona only saw their misery against Bayern continue after losing 2–0 away from home and 3–0 at home, knocking them out of the Champions League into the Europa League for a second successive season. It was the first time that Barcelona were eliminated from the group stage twice in a row in 24 years (in the 1997–98 and 1998–99 seasons respectively, the latter of which also involved Bayern Munich in that season's group stage).

On 29 May 2024, Hansi Flick was appointed as Barcelona manager, signing a contract until 2026. That year, Barcelona and Bayern again faced each other, this time in the league phase under the new Champions League format. Flick guided his new team to a 4–1 win against Bayern, putting an end to Barcelona's miserable streak.

== See also ==
- FC Barcelona in international football
- FC Bayern Munich in international football
