= Thiago Alcântara =

Spain international footballer (born 1991)

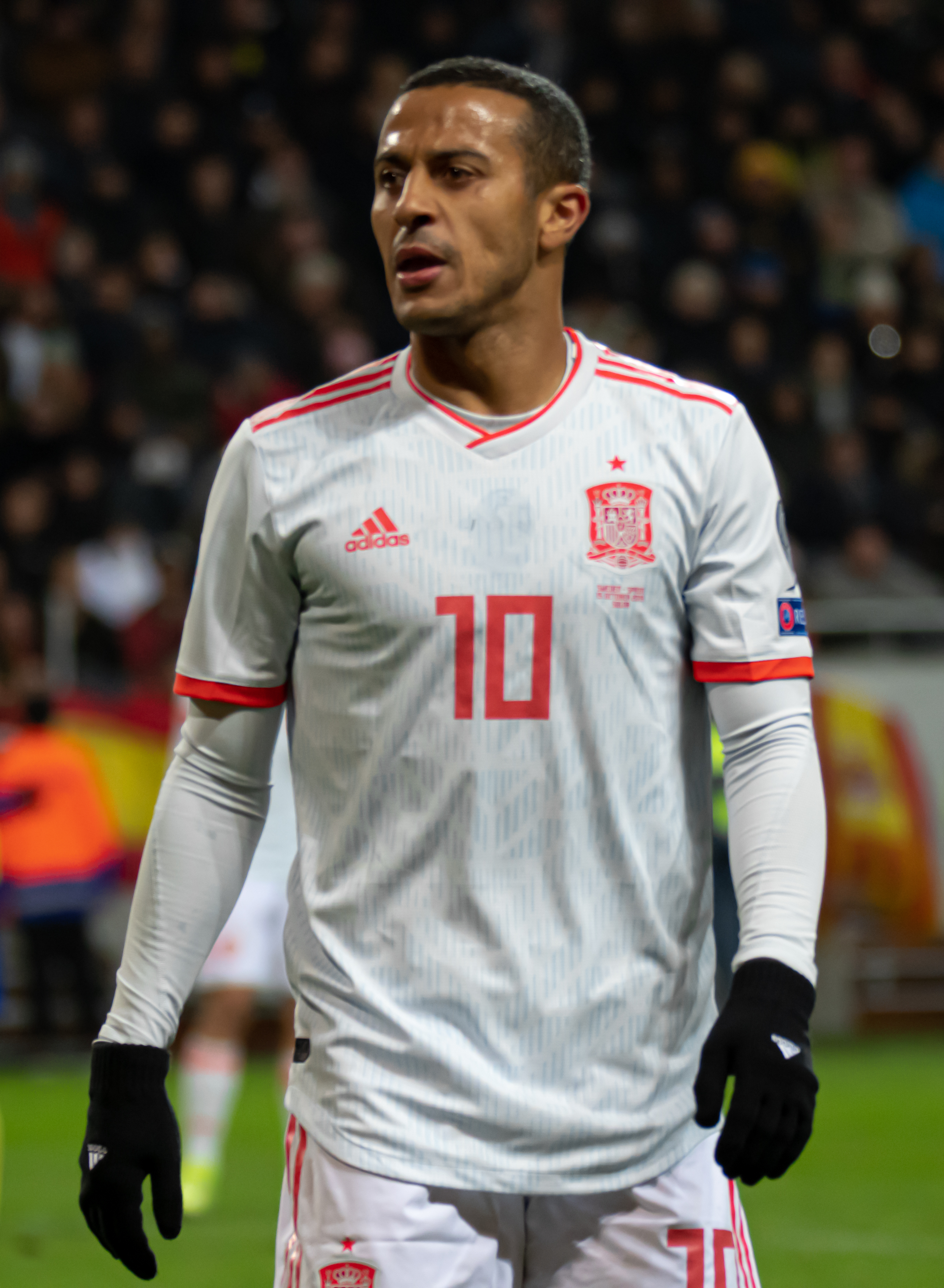
- Thiago playing for Spain in 2019

Personal information
- Full name: Thiago Alcântara do Nascimento
- Date of birth: 11 April 1991 (age 35)
- Place of birth: San Pietro Vernotico, Italy
- Height: 1.74 m (5 ft 9 in)
- Position: Midfielder

Youth career
- 1995–1996: Flamengo
- 1996–2000: Ureca
- 2000–2001: Kelme
- 2001–2005: Flamengo
- 2005–2008: Barcelona

Senior career*
Years	Team	Apps	(Gls)
2008–2011	Barcelona B	54	(2)
2009–2013	Barcelona	68	(7)
2013–2020	Bayern Munich	150	(17)
2020–2024	Liverpool	68	(2)
Total		340	(28)

International career
2007	Spain U16	1	(0)
2007–2008	Spain U17	8	(5)
2009	Spain U18	1	(1)
2009–2010	Spain U19	11	(4)
2010–2013	Spain U21	21	(6)
2011–2021	Spain	46	(2)

Managerial career
- 2024: Barcelona (assistant)
- 2025–2026: Barcelona (assistant)
Medal record
Men's football
Representing Spain
UEFA European Championship
Bronze medal – third place	2020 Europe
UEFA European Under-21 Championship
Winner	2011 Denmark
Winner	2013 Israel
UEFA European Under-19 Championship
Runner-up	2010 France
UEFA European Under-17 Championship
Winner	2008 Turkey
- * Club domestic league appearances and goals

Thiago Alcântara do Nascimento (Spanish: Alcántara; born 11 April 1991), also known mononymously as Thiago (Spanish: [ˈtjaɣo]; Brazilian Portuguese: [tʃiˈaɡu]), is a former professional footballer who played as a midfielder. Born in Italy to Brazilian parents, he played for the Spain national team.

Thiago joined Barcelona aged 14, and made his debut for the first team in 2009. After winning honours including four La Liga titles, the UEFA Champions League and the FIFA Club World Cup for Barcelona, he was signed by Bayern Munich for €25 million in 2013. In Germany, Thiago won 16 trophies, including the Bundesliga seven times in a row, and the UEFA Champions League as part of a continental treble in his final year at the club. In 2020, he signed for Liverpool in a transfer worth an initial £20 million. Despite his injuries he won the FA Cup in 2022. Thiago was selected in the FIFPRO Men's World 11 in 2020.

After helping Spain to European Championships at under-19 and under-21 levels, he made his full international debut in 2011. Thiago was part of the provisional squad for Spain in the 2014 FIFA World Cup but withdrew due to a knee injury. He was selected for UEFA Euro 2016, the 2018 World Cup, and Euro 2020.

== Club career ==
=== Early career ===
Thiago was born in San Pietro Vernotico, Italy, when his father Mazinho (player for the Brazil national team from 1989–1994) was playing for nearby Lecce. He started at the lower levels of Flamengo in Brazil, and, at the age of five, moved to Spain with his father, and started playing with Galician team Ureca in Nigrán. In 2001, he played with Kelme when his father played for Elche. He returned to Flamengo aged 10 and, in 2005, once again moved back to Spain, signing with Barcelona.

=== Barcelona ===
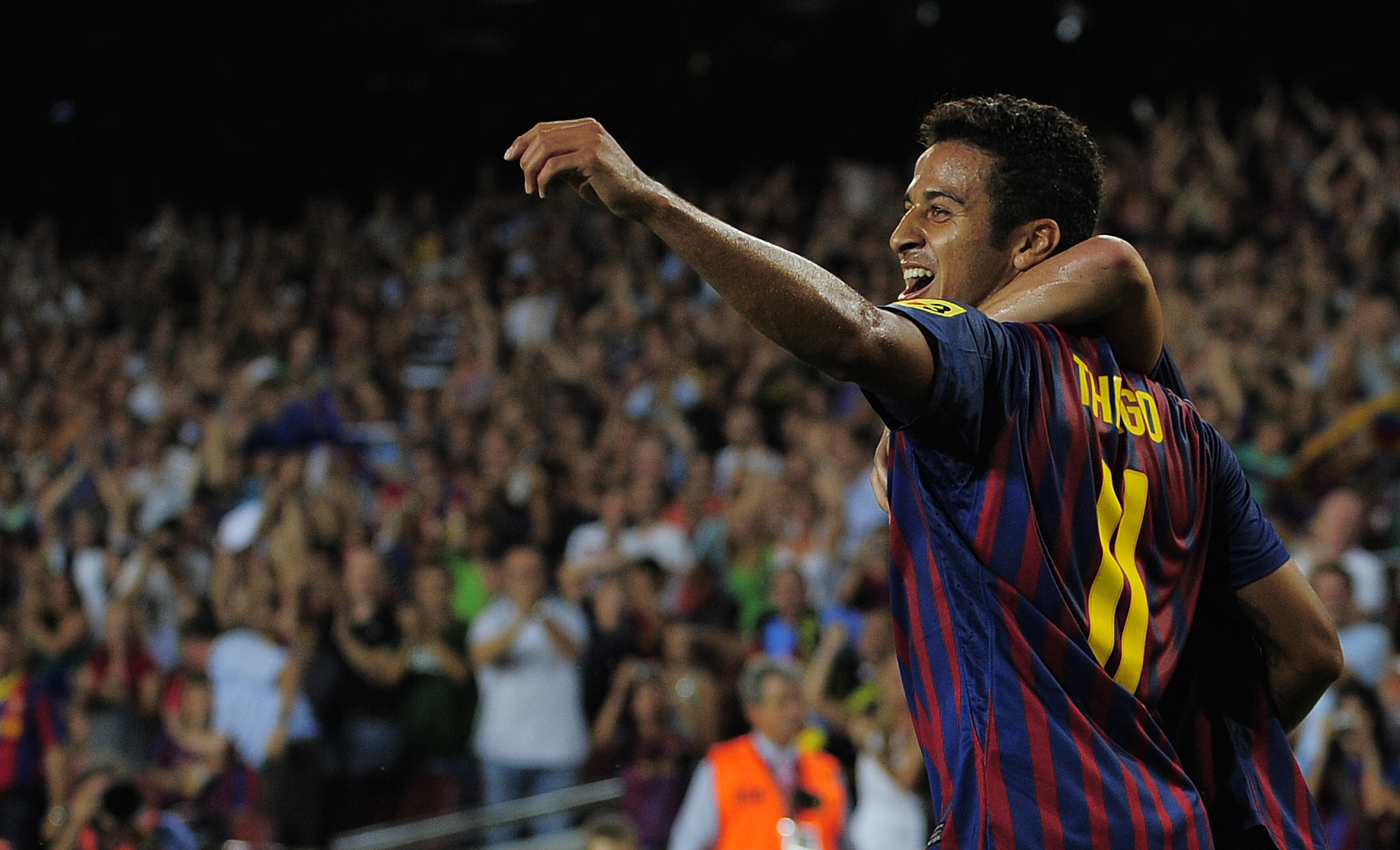
Thiago celebrates scoring for Barcelona against Villarreal in 2011

==== 2009–11 ====
On 17 May 2009, aged 18, Thiago made his debut for the first team when he came on as a substitute for Eiður Guðjohnsen in the 74th minute against Mallorca for his only appearance of the season. Barcelona, having already been declared champions of La Liga for the season, lost 1–2.

On 20 February 2010, after coming on as a substitute for Yaya Touré in the 76th minute, Thiago scored his first goal for Barcelona in a 4–0 home win against Racing Santander. He scored his third goal against Real Sociedad in a start on 29 April, although Barcelona lost 2–1. He ended the 2010–11 season with 17 games, three goals, and three assists, and was an unused substitute as Barcelona won the 2011 UEFA Champions League final against Manchester United at Wembley Stadium.

==== 2011–13 ====
Thiago started the 2011–12 season with the first leg of the Spanish Supercopa match against rivals Real Madrid, being substituted for Xavi after 58 minutes, and was an unused substitute as they defeated Porto for the 2011 UEFA Super Cup. He then scored in Barcelona's first La Liga match of the season in a 5–0 home win against Villarreal. On 18 December, he started as Barcelona won 4–0 in the Club World Cup final at International Stadium Yokohama. Thiago also netted Barcelona's fifth in a 7–0 win against Rayo Vallecano on 29 April from a close-range header. He followed this with a dance with Dani Alves then stopped by Carles Puyol.

=== Bayern Munich ===
==== 2013–15: Debut season and injury ====
I spoke to club [sic] about my concept and told them why I want Thiago. He is the only player I want. It'll be him or no one.

— Pep Guardiola to the press prior to the signing.

On 14 July 2013, Thiago signed a four-year deal with Bundesliga club Bayern Munich, for a €25 million fee. Bayern would pay €20 million to Barcelona directly with the remainder being covered by the proceeds of a friendly to be played between the two teams at some point in the following four years and by Thiago foregoing some money owed to him by Barcelona. The transfer came despite a new contract that Barcelona had given Thiago in 2011 which set his release clause at €90 million. Barcelona failed to fulfil clauses in the contract relating to the amount of playing time that Thiago received, and as a result his buy-out clause dropped to €18m. Guardiola had made Thiago a priority signing. Thiago made his Bayern debut in a 4–2 defeat to Borussia Dortmund in the 2013 DFL-Supercup on 27 July. He made his debut in the Bundesliga in a 0–1 win against Eintracht Frankfurt on 11 August 2013.

On 21 December 2013, he scored his first competitive goal for Bayern Munich, in the 2013 FIFA Club World Cup final against Raja Casablanca of Morocco, sealing the 2–0 win for the German club. On 29 January 2014, he scored his first Bundesliga goal, the scissor-kicked winner in stoppage time against VfB Stuttgart which was voted the Goal of the Month. He also had an assist to Claudio Pizarro for Bayern's first goal in the 2–1 win. Four days later, in a match against Eintracht Frankfurt, he set a Bundesliga record with 185 touches of the ball. On 23 February, in a 4–0 win over Hannover 96, Thiago scored his second and last goal of the Bundesliga season. His season ended due to a knee ligament tear against 1899 Hoffenheim six days later, although Bayern went on to win the league and cup. He finished the season with two goals in 16 Bundesliga matches, two German Cup matches, four Champions League matches, a goal in two FIFA Club World Cup, and an appearance in the German Super Cup.

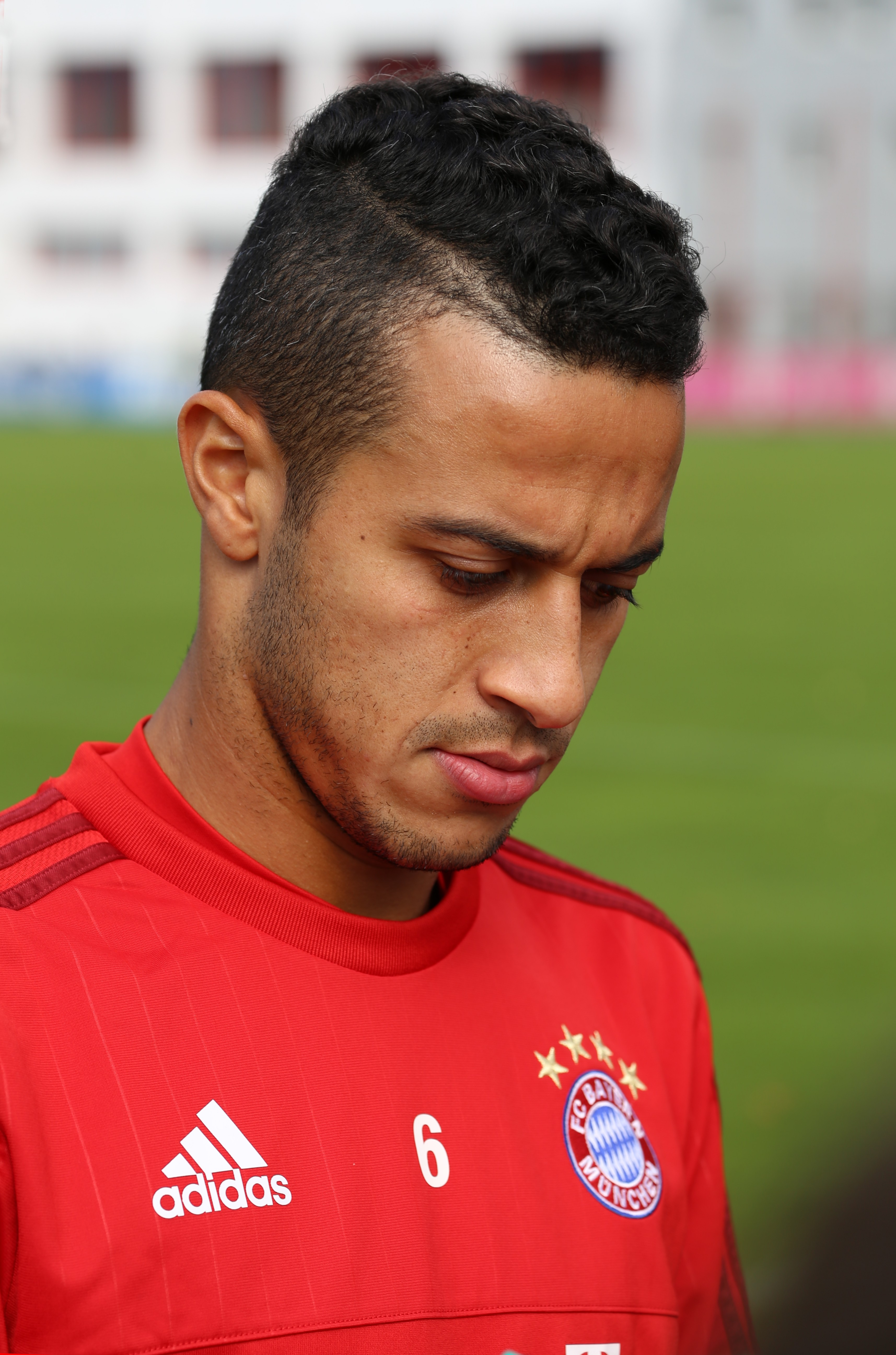
Thiago at a training session in 2015

After over a year out injured, Thiago returned on 4 April 2015, replacing Philipp Lahm for the last 21 minutes of a 1–0 win at Borussia Dortmund. Four days later, he again replaced Lahm in a DFB-Pokal quarter-final at Bayer Leverkusen, scoring the winning goal in the penalty shootout after a goalless draw. On 15 April, he scored in the team's Champions League quarter-final first leg away to Porto, albeit in a 1–3 defeat. Six days later, he headed in Juan Bernat's cross for the opening goal of a 6–1 rout to overturn the first leg deficit against Porto, helping Bayern advance to the Champions League semi-finals. On 26 April, after VfL Wolfsburg lost to Borussia Mönchengladbach, Thiago won his second Bundesliga title for Bayern. He finished the season with two goals in 13 appearances.

==== 2015–17: Domestic double and individual success ====
On 27 August 2015, Thiago signed a new four-year contract with Bayern. On 10 February 2016, he contributed a goal in 3–0 win over VfL Bochum in the DFB-Pokal quarter-final match. He scored twice in a 5–0 home victory over Werder Bremen on 12 March. On 17 March, Thiago scored a goal in a brilliant comeback against Juventus as his side came from 2–0 down to gain a 4–2 victory in the Champions League round of sixteen tie. He finished the season with four goals and seven assists. In addition to playing in the German Super Cup, Thiago scored two goals in 27 Bundesliga matches, a goal in five German Cup matches, and a goal in nine Champions League matches.

Thiago started the 2016–17 season under new club manager Carlo Ancelotti by winning the 2016 DFL-Supercup with a 2–0 victory against his club's rival Borussia Dortmund on 15 August 2016. On 21 September, he scored his first goal of the season in a 3–0 victory over Hertha BSC. Thiago contributed one goal and one assist in a 3–0 victory over RB Leipzig and was named Man of the match on 22 December. On 16 February 2017, he scored two goals and provided one assist as Bayern defeated Arsenal with a 5–1 victory in the first leg of the Champions League round of sixteen tie. On 28 April, he signed a new four-year contract until 2021. He scored nine goals and had nine assists throughout the season.

==== 2017–20: Consistent silverware, European treble ====
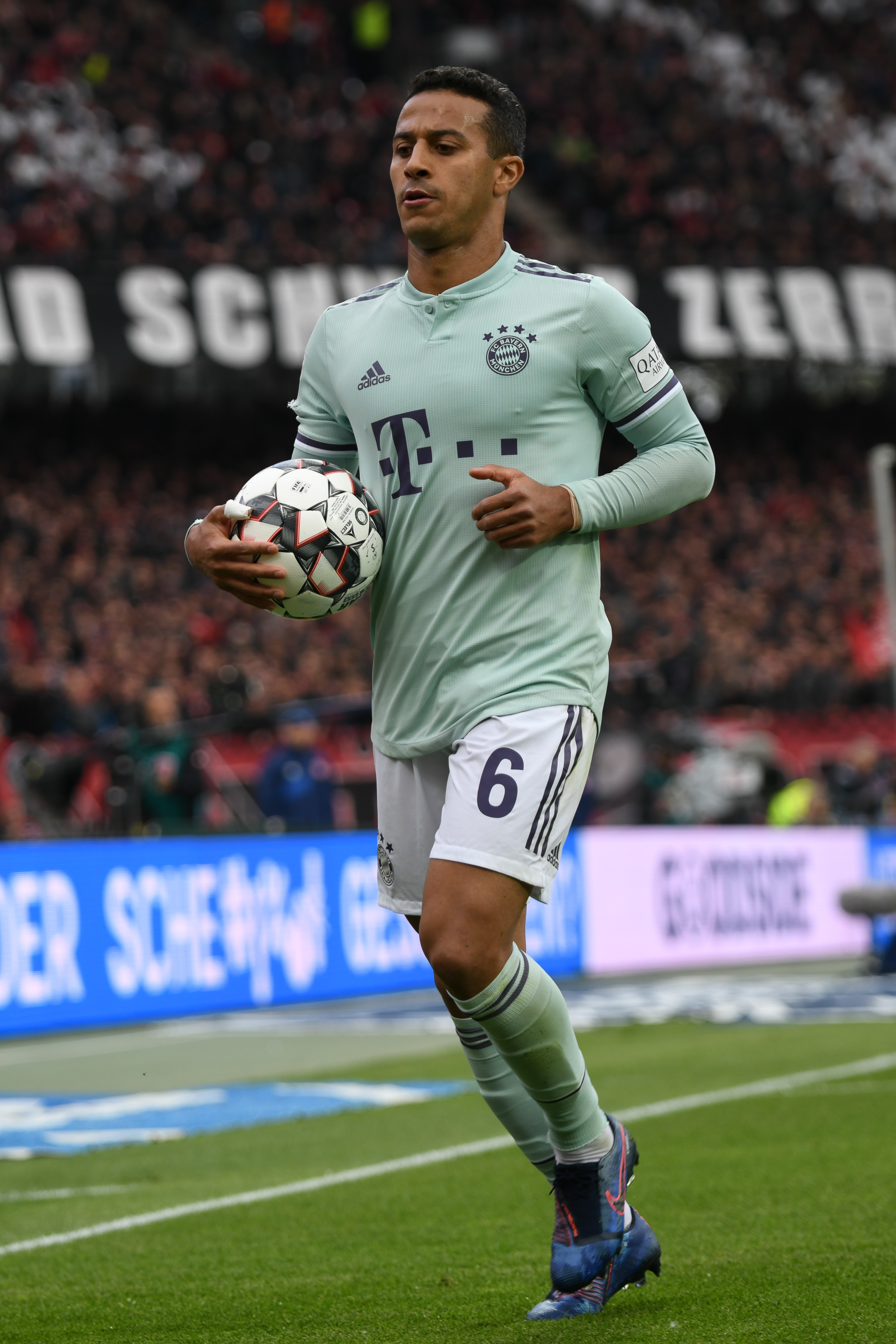
Thiago during a Bundesliga game with Bayern in 2019

Because of an injury, Thiago could not play his club's first competitive match of the season, in the 2017 DFL-Supercup where Bayern won against Borussia Dortmund 5–4 on penalties on 6 August 2017. On 26 October, he scored an equalizing goal against RB Leipzig to make it 1–1 and later Bayern went on to win the DFB-Pokal second-round match 5–4 on penalties. On 23 November, he was substituted in the 44th minute of the match as he suffered a serious muscle injury in his thigh in Bayern's 2–1 away victory over Anderlecht in the Champions League group stage match and was confirmed by his club manager Jupp Heynckes that he will be out for a long period of time. Thiago was back in the starting lineup and made his first appearance since his injury in November in a 2–1 away victory over VfL Wolfsburg on 17 February 2018. On 4 April, he scored a header which secured Bayern Munich a 2–1 away victory over Sevilla in the first leg of their Champions League quarter-final tie. He finished the season with seven goals in 31 appearances.

He's a coach's dream. He's the heartbeat of our midfield, a player who can do everything with the ball.

— Niko Kovač on Thiago after the double-winning 2018–19 season.

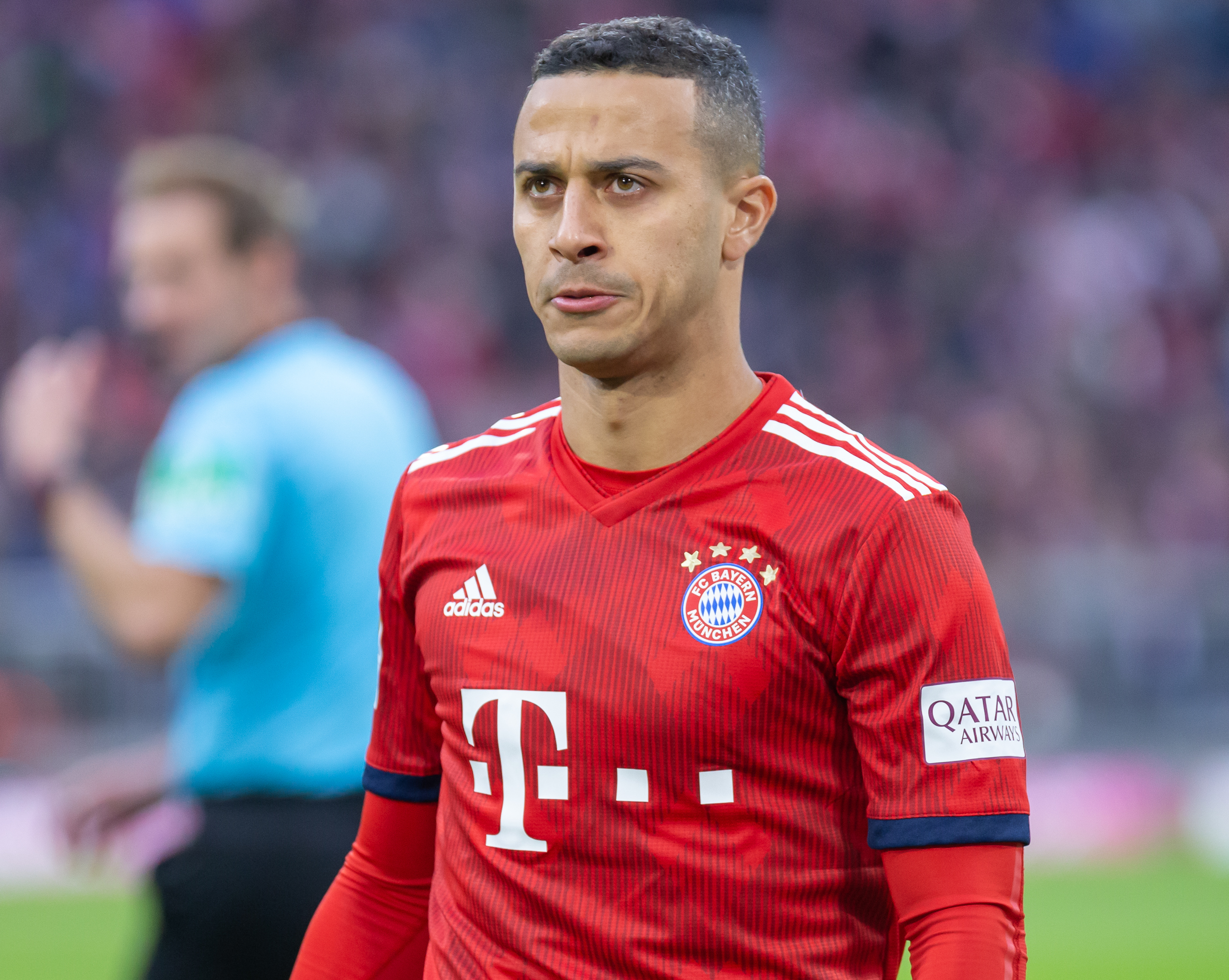
Thiago with Bayern in 2019

On 12 August 2018, Thiago played the first competitive match of the season under the new club manager Niko Kovač and also scored a goal in a 5–0 victory over Eintracht Frankfurt as Bayern won the 2018 DFL-Supercup. On 18 May 2019, Thiago won his sixth consecutive Bundesliga title as Bayern finished two points above Dortmund with 78 points. A week later, Thiago won his third DFB-Pokal as Bayern defeated RB Leipzig 3–0 in the 2019 DFB-Pokal final.

Amidst heavy media speculation linking him with a potential move to Liverpool, Thiago played for Bayern in the Champions League quarter-final against his former club Barcelona, participating in an 8–2 demolition of the Catalan outfit. Thiago started for Bayern in the 2020 Champions League final against Paris Saint-Germain, playing 86 minutes before being substituted, as Bayern won their sixth Champions League, and completed the treble, having earlier clinched that season's Bundesliga and defeated Bayer Leverkusen in the DFB-Pokal final.

=== Liverpool and retirement ===
==== 2020–2021 ====
On 18 September 2020, Premier League club Liverpool signed Thiago on a four-year contract. With the player only having a year left on his Bayern contract, Liverpool were able to purchase Thiago for £20 million, with the potential for a further £5m in add-ons. Thiago made his debut for Liverpool on 20 September, coming off the bench at half-time as the visitors won 2–0 against Chelsea at Stamford Bridge. With 75 successful passes, Thiago had the most passes completed by a player who played a maximum of 45 minutes in the Premier League since Opta started producing passing statistics in 2003. He has set the new record for most passes in 45 minutes as a substitute. On 29 September, Liverpool confirmed Thiago had tested positive for COVID-19.

On 17 October 2020, Thiago played his second game for Liverpool in a 2–2 away league draw against local rivals Everton. He suffered a knee injury towards the end of the game as Richarlison made a tackle that would give him a straight red card after the challenge. Thiago ended up playing the last few minutes of the game. He would not play again for several months. He returned to make a substitute appearance in Liverpool's 0–0 draw with Newcastle United on 30 December. On 8 May 2021, Thiago scored his first goal for Liverpool to seal a 2–0 home league win over Southampton.

On 24 November 2021, Thiago cut across the ball to score with a 25-yard strike (his first goal of the 2021–22 season) in a 2–0 home win for Liverpool against Porto in the UEFA Champions League group stage.

==== 2022–2024 ====
On 27 February 2022, Thiago was due to start the 2022 EFL Cup final, but sustained an injury in the warm-up and was replaced by Naby Keïta. Liverpool went on to beat Chelsea 11–10 on penalties after the match finished 0–0 after extra time. On 19 April, Thiago earned a standing ovation from the spectators for his performance when he was replaced by Keïta in a 4–0 victory against Manchester United. On 14 May 2022, Thiago started for Liverpool in the 2022 FA Cup final, defeating Chelsea in a 6–5 victory on penalties after the game ended 0–0 in extra time. Thiago scored his penalty, sending it past Chelsea goalkeeper Edouard Mendy, which in turn gave Thiago his second trophy since joining Liverpool. On 17 May 2022, Thiago was named Liverpool's player of the month for April 2022. Liverpool narrowly missed out on the chance to achieve a historic quadruple, coming second in the Premier League and the 2021–22 UEFA Champions League but winning both the EFL Cup and the FA Cup. His performances during the season earned him a place in the Premier League PFA Team of the Year.

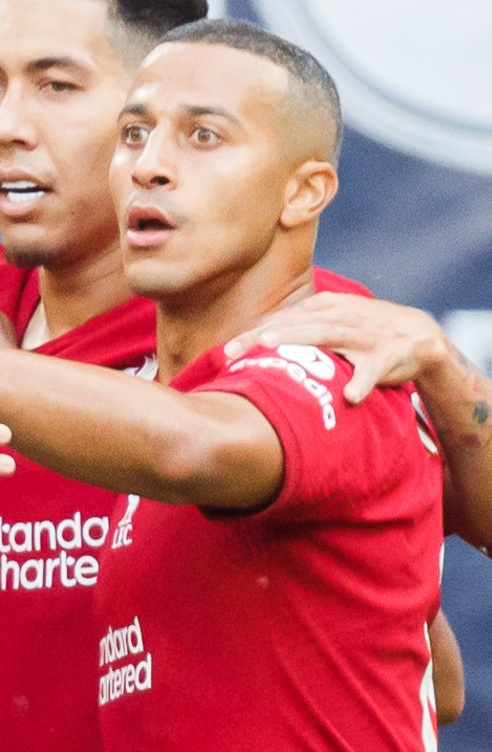
Thiago playing for Liverpool in 2022

On 30 July 2022, Thiago was part of the squad which won the FA Community Shield. He played 28 times in all competitions in the 2022–23 season but on 3 May 2023, several leading British media outlets reported he would miss the rest of the season after undergoing hip surgery. At the end of the 2022–23 season, Liverpool just missed out on UEFA Champions League qualification. He returned to the squad on 4 February 2024 as a substitute in the 85th minute in a 3–1 defeat against Arsenal after 284 days sidelined. However, he suffered a muscle injury in this match. On 17 May 2024, it was confirmed that he would leave Liverpool at the end of the season.

On 7 July 2024, it was reported that Thiago would be retiring from professional football. The following day, Thiago officially announced his retirement via social media.

== International career ==
As a Brazilian and Spanish citizen, Thiago was eligible to represent Brazil and Spain at international level; he ultimately opted for Spain.

=== Youth ===
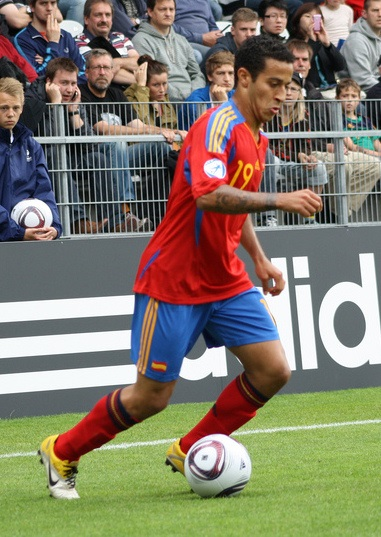
Thiago in an under-21 international, 2011

He participated in the 2008 UEFA European Under-17 Championship with Spain, helping his country to eventual victory in the tournament, and scoring in the final. Thiago was ever-present during Spain's victorious 2011 UEFA European Under-21 Championship campaign, scoring the second goal of a 2–0 victory with a 40-yard free kick in the final against Switzerland. He was awarded the man of the match of the final.

On 18 June 2013, he scored a hat-trick in the 2013 UEFA European Under-21 Championship final as Spain defeated Italy 4–2 to win their fourth title.

=== Senior ===
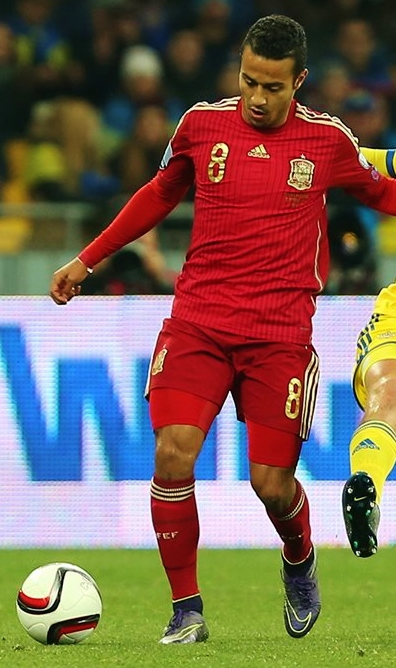
Thiago playing for Spain in October 2015

He made his first appearance for Spain's senior squad in a friendly against Italy on 10 August 2011, while his first competitive match was on 6 September 2011, in a Euro 2012 qualifying match 6–0 win against Liechtenstein. Due to injury he missed Euro 2012 and the 2012 Summer Olympics in London.

Thiago was named in Spain's 30-man provisional squad for the 2014 World Cup on 13 May of that year. However, two days later, he withdrew from the squad due to a knee ligament injury obtained while playing for Bayern in March. Bayern Chief Executive Karl-Heinz Rummenigge said, "A young man who wanted to come back at the World Cup, and suddenly his dreams are burst. We will take care of him now and make sure he is fit at the start of the season."

On 2 October 2015, with the team's place in the tournament already assured, Thiago was re-called by manager Vicente del Bosque for the first time since his injury, and ten days later featured in their 1–0 UEFA Euro 2016 qualifying win away to Ukraine. On 6 October 2017, he scored his first goal for his national team in the 26th minute against Albania in a World Cup qualifier. Álvaro Odriozola sent in a cross from the right side of the box and Thiago directed the ball into the bottom corner from close range with his head.

In May 2018, he was named in Spain's 24-men squad for the warm up matches for 2018 FIFA World Cup in Russia. Thiago was selected in the final 23-man squad for the 2018 World Cup. Thiago appeared in two matches, against Portugal and Morocco. In May 2021, Thiago was included in the 24-man squad for UEFA Euro 2020. He was not included in the squad for the 2022 FIFA World Cup.

== Coaching career ==
Following his retirement in July 2024, Thiago temporarily joined the coaching staff of his former Bayern coach Hansi Flick at his former club Barcelona. In August 2024, Thiago left his role as assistant coach at Barcelona. He was reappointed as part of Hansi Flick’s staff on 11 September 2025.

== Style of play ==
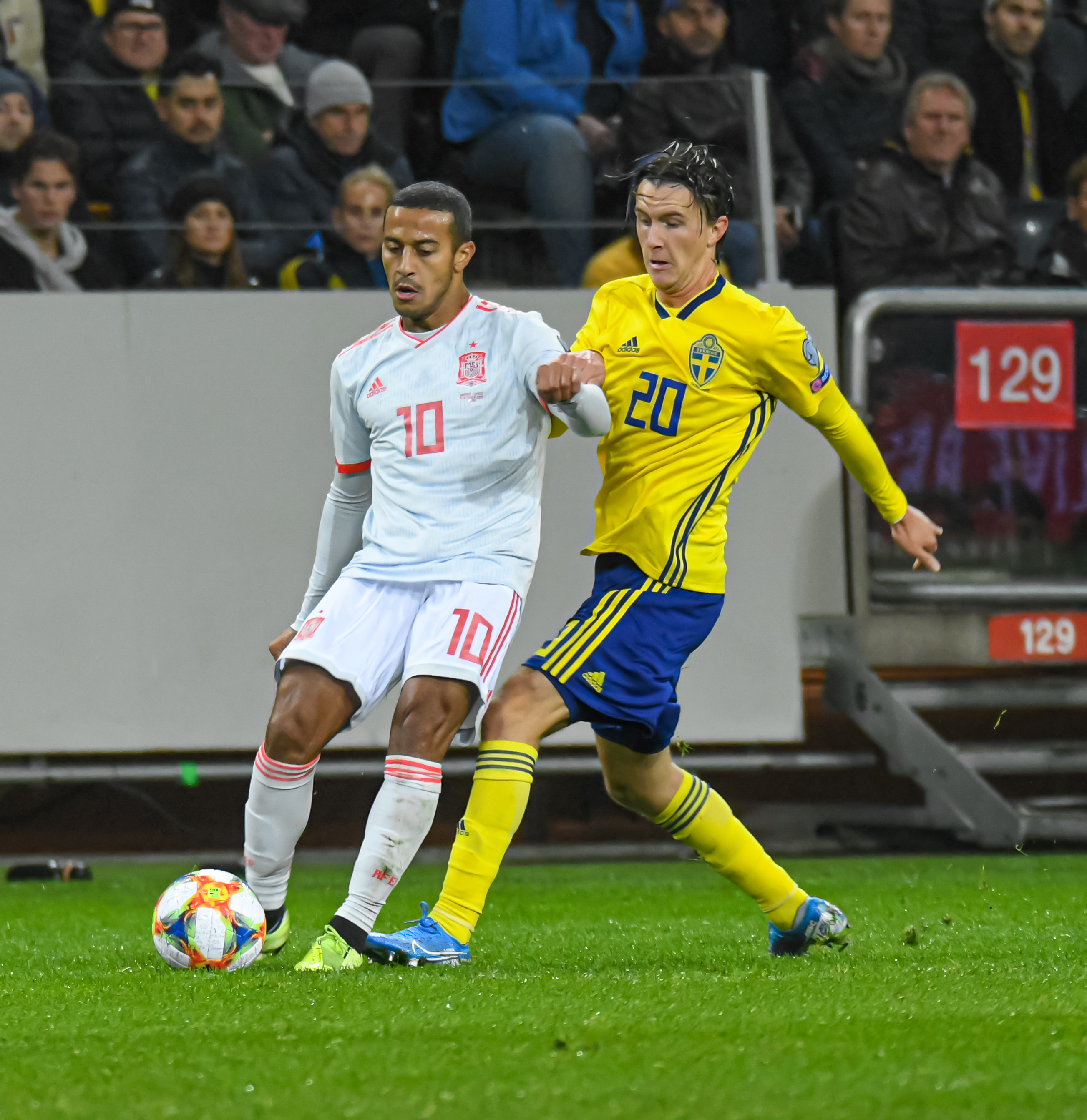
Thiago on the ball against Kristoffer Olsson for Spain against Sweden in 2019

Thiago was a highly creative and technically gifted playmaker, with excellent dribbling skills and ball control, which allowed him to operate effectively in a deep-seated playmaking role as a central midfielder, although he was also capable of playing in a more advanced role as an attacking midfielder. Called "an extraordinary player" by Xavi in 2013, Thiago was noted for his accurate distribution of the ball, as he possessed great passing technique and vision, and maintained a 90.2% pass success rate throughout the 2016–17 Bundesliga season, higher than any other player in Germany. Thiago was identified by Neymar on a potential list of the five players he believed may have been more technical than him. Despite his reputation as a world class midfielder in the media, Thiago often struggled with injuries throughout his career.

== Personal life ==
Thiago is the son of the Brazilian former footballer and 1994 World Cup winner Mazinho. His mother, Valéria Alcântara, was a former Brazilian volleyball player. His younger brother, Rafinha, played for the Brazil national team. Rodrigo, who also played for Spain, is a lifelong friend and not a cousin as has been erroneously reported.

On 27 June 2015, he married his girlfriend, Júlia Vigas, in a ceremony in Sant Climent de Peralta, Catalonia, Spain.

He owns dual citizenship: Brazilian citizenship along with Spanish citizenship.

Thiago is multilingual; he is fluent in five languages: Spanish, Portuguese, Catalan, German, and English.

== Career statistics ==
=== Club ===
Appearances and goals by club, season and competition
Club	Season	League			National cup (Note: Includes Copa del Rey, DFB-Pokal and FA Cup)		League cup (Note: Includes EFL Cup)		Europe		Other		Total	
Club	Season	Division	Apps	Goals	Apps	Goals	Apps	Goals	Apps	Goals	Apps	Goals	Apps	Goals
Barcelona B	2007–08	Tercera División	5	0	—		—		—		—		5	0
Barcelona B	2008–09	Segunda División B	25	0	—		—		—		—		25	0
Barcelona B	2009–10	Segunda División B	13	2	—		—		—		5 (Note: Appearances in Segunda División B play-offs)	1	18	3
Barcelona B	2010–11	Segunda División	11	0	—		—		—		—		11	0
Barcelona B	Total		54	2	0	0	0	0	0	0	5	1	59	3
Barcelona	2008–09	La Liga	1	0	0	0	—		0	0	—		1	0
Barcelona	2009–10	La Liga	1	1	1	0	—		0	0	0	0	2	1
Barcelona	2010–11	La Liga	12	2	3	1	—		1 (Note: Appearance(s) in UEFA Champions League)	0	1 (Note: Appearance in Supercopa de España)	0	17	3
Barcelona	2011–12	La Liga	27	2	8	2	—		7	0	3 (Note: One appearance in Supercopa de España, two appearances in FIFA Club World Cup)	0	45	4
Barcelona	2012–13	La Liga	27	2	7	1	—		2	0	0	0	36	3
Barcelona	Total		68	7	19	4	0	0	10	0	4	0	101	11
Bayern Munich	2013–14	Bundesliga	16	2	2	0	—		4	0	3 (Note: One appearance in DFL-Supercup, two appearances and one goal in FIFA Club World Cup)	1	25	3
Bayern Munich	2014–15	Bundesliga	7	0	2	0	—		4	2	0	0	13	2
Bayern Munich	2015–16	Bundesliga	27	2	5	1	—		9	1	1 (Note: Appearance in DFL-Supercup)	0	42	4
Bayern Munich	2016–17	Bundesliga	27	6	4	1	—		9	2	1	0	41	9
Bayern Munich	2017–18	Bundesliga	19	2	3	2	—		10	3	0	0	32	7
Bayern Munich	2018–19	Bundesliga	30	2	6	0	—		5	0	1	1	42	3
Bayern Munich	2019–20	Bundesliga	24	3	5	0	—		10	0	1	0	40	3
Bayern Munich	Total		150	17	27	4	0	0	51	8	7	2	235	31
Liverpool	2020–21	Premier League	24	1	2	0	0	0	4	0	—		30	1
Liverpool	2021–22	Premier League	25	1	4	0	0	0	10	1	—		39	2
Liverpool	2022–23	Premier League	18	0	3	0	1	0	5	0	1 (Note: Appearance in FA Community Shield)	0	28	0
Liverpool	2023–24	Premier League	1	0	0	0	0	0	0	0	—		1	0
Liverpool	Total		68	2	9	0	1	0	19	1	1	0	98	3
Career total			341	28	56	8	1	0	80	9	12	3	488	48

=== International ===
Appearances and goals by national team and year
National team	Year	Apps	Goals
Spain	2011	3	0
Spain	2012	0	0
Spain	2013	1	0
Spain	2014	1	0
Spain	2015	2	0
Spain	2016	11	0
Spain	2017	7	1
Spain	2018	9	1
Spain	2019	3	0
Spain	2020	2	0
Spain	2021	7	0
Total		46	2

Scores and results list Spain's goal tally first, score column indicates score after each Thiago goal.

List of international goals scored by Thiago
No.	Date	Venue	Opponent	Score	Result	Competition
1	6 October 2017	Estadio José Rico Pérez, Alicante, Spain	Albania	3–0	3–0	2018 FIFA World Cup qualification
2	27 March 2018	Wanda Metropolitano, Madrid, Spain	Argentina	4–1	6–1	Friendly

== Honours ==
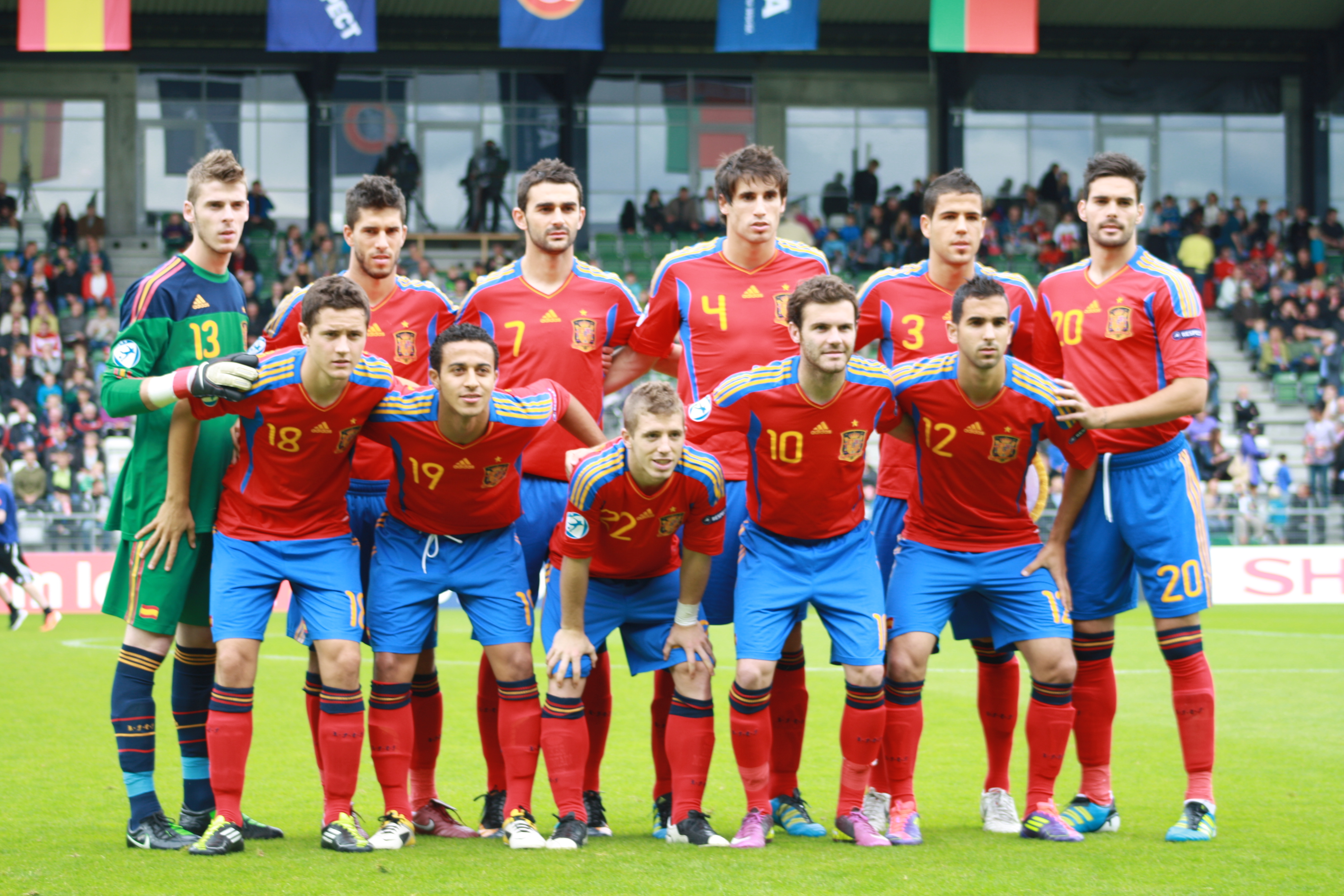
Thiago (number 19) lining up with the Spanish team that won the 2011 European Under-21 Championship

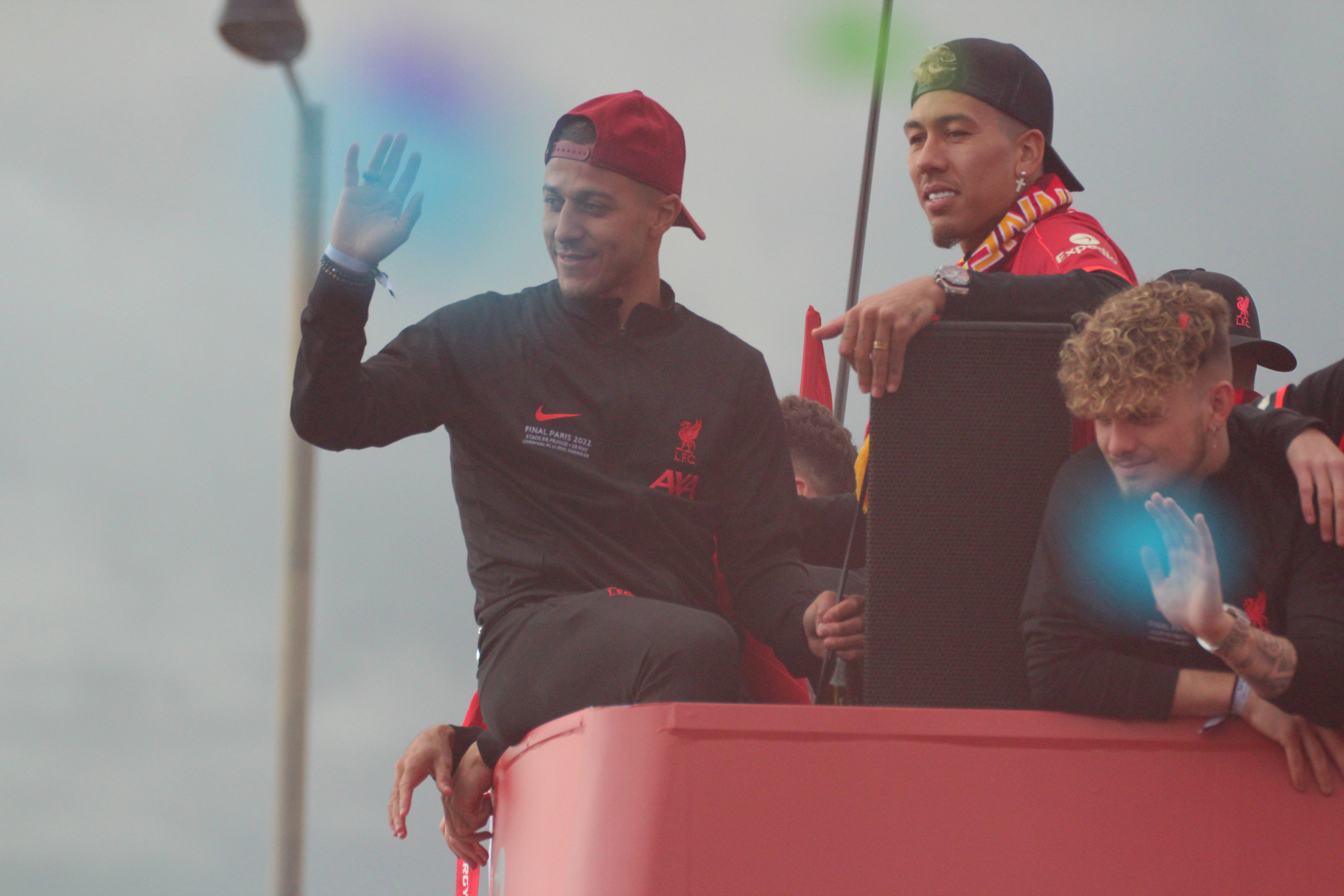
Thiago celebrating winning the cup double in a trophy parade with Liverpool in 2022.

=== Player ===
Barcelona

- La Liga: 2008–09, 2009–10, 2010–11, 2012–13
- Copa del Rey: 2011–12
- Supercopa de España: 2010, 2011
- UEFA Champions League: 2010–11
- UEFA Super Cup: 2011
- FIFA Club World Cup: 2011

Bayern Munich

- Bundesliga: 2013–14, 2014–15, 2015–16, 2016–17, 2017–18, 2018–19, 2019–20
- DFB-Pokal: 2013–14, 2015–16, 2018–19, 2019–20
- DFL-Supercup: 2016, 2018
- UEFA Champions League: 2019–20
- FIFA Club World Cup: 2013

Liverpool

- FA Cup: 2021–22
- EFL Cup: 2021–22
- FA Community Shield: 2022
- UEFA Champions League runner-up: 2021–22

Spain U17

- UEFA European Under-17 Championship: 2008

Spain U21

- UEFA European Under-21 Championship: 2011, 2013

Individual

- UEFA European Under-21 Championship Team of the Tournament: 2011
- UEFA European Under-21 Championship Golden Player: 2013
- UEFA European Under-21 Championship Silver Boot: 2013
- UEFA European Under-21 Championship Team of the Tournament: 2013
- Goal of the Month in Germany: January 2014
- Bundesliga Team of the Season: 2016–17
- ESM Team of the Season: 2016–17
- kicker Bundesliga Team of the Season: 2018–19
- UEFA Champions League Squad of the Season: 2019–20
- IFFHS Men's World Team: 2020
- FIFA FIFPro World11: 2020
- UEFA Team of the Year: 2020
- PFA Team of the Year: 2021–22 Premier League

=== Assistant Manager ===
Barcelona

- La Liga: 2025–26
- Supercopa de España: 2026

== See also ==
- List of Spain international footballers born outside Spain
