= 2019–20 FC Bayern Munich season =

121st season in existence of Bayern Munich

Bayern Munich
2019–20 season
- President: Uli Hoeneß (until 15 November); Herbert Hainer (from 15 November)
- CEO: Karl-Heinz Rummenigge
- Head coach: Niko Kovač (until 3 November); Hansi Flick (interim from 4 November to 3 April, permanent from 3 April)
- Stadium: Allianz Arena
- Bundesliga: 1st
- DFB-Pokal: Winners
- DFL-Supercup: Runners-up
- UEFA Champions League: Winners
- Top goalscorer: League: Robert Lewandowski (34 goals); All: Robert Lewandowski (55 goals)
- Biggest win: 6–0 v. Red Star Belgrade; 26 November 2019, Champions League; 6–0 v. 1899 Hoffenheim; 29 February 2020, Bundesliga; 8–2 v. Barcelona; 14 August 2020, Champions League
- Biggest defeat: 1–5 v. Eintracht Frankfurt; 2 November 2019, Bundesliga
Home colours	Away colours	Third colours

2020–21 home kit, used from 10 June onward.
2020–21 away kit, used from 25 July onward.

The 2019–20 FC Bayern Munich season was the 121st season in the football club's history and 55th consecutive and overall season in the top flight of German football, the Bundesliga, having been promoted from the Regionalliga in 1965. Bayern also participated in this season's edition of the domestic cup, the DFB-Pokal, and the premier continental cup competition, the UEFA Champions League. As a result of winning the prior season's Bundesliga and DFB-Pokal, they took part in the German super cup, the DFL-Supercup, as well.

After their campaign was halted in March due to the COVID-19 pandemic, Bayern would return to action in May behind closed doors. They then went on to win all sixteen of their season's remaining fixtures, capped off by a 1–0 victory against Paris Saint-Germain in the Champions League final, to secure a continental treble for the second time in club history, seven years after first accomplishing the feat in 2012–13. This made Bayern only the second European club after Barcelona (who Bayern defeated 8–2 en route to their Champions League victory) to win multiple continental trebles, and extended Bayern's ongoing unbeaten streak to thirty matches (of which only one wasn't a victory).

As a result of their domestic double, Bayern qualified for next season's DFL-Supercup, which they went on to win. As Champions League title holders, they would also qualify for both the UEFA Super Cup and FIFA Club World Cup, eventually lifting each of these trophies as well. With these victories ensuring Bayern had won all six competitions they took part in across the 2020 calendar year, the club thus joined Barcelona in 2009 as the only other side to accomplish this "sextuple" in the history of European football.

The season was the first since 2006–07 without Franck Ribéry, who departed for Fiorentina in the summer, and the first since 2008–09 without Dutchman Arjen Robben, who initially retired after the 2018–19 season.

== Squad information ==
Note: Flags indicate national team as defined under FIFA eligibility rules; some limited exceptions apply. Players may hold more than one non-FIFA nationality.

No.	Pos.	Nation	Player
1	GK	GER	Manuel Neuer (captain)
2	DF	ESP	Álvaro Odriozola (on loan from Real Madrid)
4	DF	GER	Niklas Süle
5	DF	FRA	Benjamin Pavard
6	MF	ESP	Thiago
7	FW	GER	Serge Gnabry
8	MF	ESP	Javi Martínez
9	FW	POL	Robert Lewandowski
10	MF	BRA	Philippe Coutinho (on loan from Barcelona)
11	FW	FRA	Kingsley Coman
14	MF	CRO	Ivan Perišić (on loan from Inter Milan)
17	DF	GER	Jérôme Boateng

No.	Pos.	Nation	Player
18	MF	GER	Leon Goretzka
19	DF	CAN	Alphonso Davies
21	DF	FRA	Lucas Hernandez
24	MF	FRA	Corentin Tolisso
25	FW	GER	Thomas Müller (vice-captain)
26	GK	GER	Sven Ulreich
27	DF	AUT	David Alaba
32	MF	GER	Joshua Kimmich
35	FW	NED	Joshua Zirkzee
41	DF	USA	Chris Richards
42	MF	ENG	Jamal Musiala

== Transfers ==
=== In ===
Date from	Position	Player	Transferred from	Type	Fee	Ref.
1 July 2019	DF	(France) Benjamin Pavard	(Germany) VfB Stuttgart	Transfer	€35m	
1 July 2019	DF	(France) Lucas Hernandez	(Spain) Atlético Madrid	Transfer	€80m	
1 July 2019	FW	(Germany) Fiete Arp	(Germany) Hamburger SV	Transfer	€2.5m	
13 August 2019	MF	(Croatia) Ivan Perišić	(Italy) Inter Milan	Loan	€5m	
17 August 2019	MF	(France) Michaël Cuisance	(Germany) Borussia Mönchengladbach	Transfer	€10m	
17 August 2019	MF	(Brazil) Philippe Coutinho	(Spain) Barcelona	Loan	€8.5m, with an option to buyout at €120m	
22 January 2020	DF	(Spain) Álvaro Odriozola	(Spain) Real Madrid	Loan	Undisclosed	

=== Out ===
Date from	Position	Player	Transferred to	Fee	Ref.
30 June 2019	MF	(France) Franck Ribéry	(Italy) Fiorentina	Free transfer	
30 June 2019	MF	(Netherlands) Arjen Robben	N/A	Retired	
30 June 2019	MF	(Colombia) James Rodríguez	(Spain) Real Madrid	Loan return	
1 July 2019	DF	(Austria) Marco Friedl	(Germany) Werder Bremen	€3.5m	
1 July 2019	DF	(Brazil) Rafinha	(Brazil) Flamengo	Free transfer	
1 July 2019	DF	(Germany) Mats Hummels	(Germany) Borussia Dortmund	€38m	
1 July 2019	FW	(South Korea) Jeong Woo-yeong	(Germany) SC Freiburg	€2m	
23 August 2019	MF	(Portugal) Renato Sanches	(France) Lille	€25m	

== Friendly matches ==
Win Draw Loss

26 May 2019 Treble Reunion Match	Manchester United Legends	5–0	Bayern Munich Legends	Manchester, England
	Solskjær 5'; Yorke 30'; Butt 79'; Saha 85'; Beckham 90'	Report		Stadium: Old Trafford; Attendance: 61,175
Note: This was a friendly match played by teams made up of retired club legends.

17 July 2019 ICC 1	Arsenal	2–1	Bayern Munich	Carson, California, United States
20:00 PDT (UTC−7); 18 July 2019, 05:00 CEST (UTC+2)	Poznański 49' (o.g.); Nketiah 88'	Report	Lewandowski 71'	Stadium: Dignity Health Sports Park; Attendance: 26,704; Referee: Kevin Stott (United States)

20 July 2019 ICC 2	Bayern Munich	3–1	Real Madrid	Houston, Texas, United States
19:00 CDT (UTC−5); 21 July 2019, 02:00 CEST (UTC+2)	Tolisso 15'; Kimmich (yellow card) 51'; Lewandowski 67'; Gnabry 69'; Ulreich (red card) 81'; Goretzka (yellow card) 90+2'	Report	Rodrygo 84'	Stadium: NRG Stadium; Attendance: 60,143; Referee: Ramy Touchan (United States)

23 July 2019 ICC 3	Bayern Munich	1–0	Milan	Kansas City, Kansas, United States
20:00 CDT (UTC−5); 24 July 2019, 03:00 CEST (UTC+2)	Goretzka 45+3'	Report	Çalhanoğlu (yellow card) 49'	Stadium: Children's Mercy Park; Attendance: 18,467; Referee: Allen Chapman (United States)

30 July 2019 AC SF	Bayern Munich	6–1	Fenerbahçe	Munich, Germany
20:30 CEST (UTC+2)	Sanches 22'; Goretzka 28'; Müller 31', 44' (pen.), 58'; Coman 40'	Report	Isla (yellow card) 43'; Kruse 64'; Sağlam (yellow card) 81'	Stadium: Allianz Arena; Referee: Felix Brych (Germany)

31 July 2019 AC F	Tottenham Hotspur	2–2 (6–5 p)	Bayern Munich	Munich, Germany
20:30 CEST (UTC+2)	Lamela 19'; Eriksen 59'; Foyth (yellow card) 72'	Report	Arp 61'; Davies 81'	Stadium: Allianz Arena; Attendance: 67,500; Referee: Robert Hartmann (Germany)
	Penalties
	Alderweireld (penalty scored); Eriksen (penalty missed); Kane (penalty scored); Son Heung-min (penalty scored); Roles (penalty scored); Skipp (penalty scored); Tanganga (penalty scored)		(penalty missed) Alaba; (penalty scored) Thiago; (penalty scored) Müller; (penalty scored) Sanches; (penalty scored) Lewandowski; (penalty scored) Singh; (penalty missed) Boateng

8 August 2019 Friendly	FC Rottach-Egern	0–23	Bayern Munich	Rottach-Egern, Germany
18:30 CEST (UTC+2)		Report	Sanches 6', 20'; Dajaku 7'; Lewandowski 9', 16', 29'; Gnabry 34'; Tolisso 38', 40', 41', 42'; Müller 49', 61', 88'; Wriedt 55', 77', 83'; Singh 59'; Goretzka 63', 67', 79'; Dietrich 73' (o.g.); Nollenberger 80'	Stadium: Sportplatz Birkenmoos; Attendance: 2,500; Referee: Jochen Gschwendtner (Germany)

25 August 2019 Dream Game	Vilshofen Rot Weiß	1–13	Bayern Munich	Vilshofen, Germany
16:00 CEST (UTC+2)	Eberle 42'	Report	Perišić 9'; Can Karatas 22', 50', 89'; Müller 32'; Coutinho 35'; Zirkzee 47'; Cuisance 49'; Singh 62'; Nollenberger 68'; Wriedt 72', 81', 86'	Stadium: Klaus-Augenthaler-Stadion; Attendance: 6,500; Referee: Tobias Wittmann (Germany)

11 January 2020 Friendly	1. FC Nürnberg	5–2	Bayern Munich	Nuremberg, Germany
15:30 CET (UTC+1)	Frey 22'; Ishak 46'; Zreľák 57'; Schleusener 60'; Hack 76'	Report	Davies 34'; Tillman 83'	Stadium: Max-Morlock-Stadion; Attendance: 27,054; Referee: Asmir Osmanagic (Germany)

31 July 2020 Audi Digital Summer Tour	Bayern Munich	1–0	Marseille	Munich, Germany
16:00 CEST (UTC+2)	Gnabry 19'	Report		Stadium: FC Bayern Campus; Attendance: 0 Referee: Felix Brych (Germany)

== Competitions ==
Win Draw Loss

=== Overview ===
Competition	First match	Last match	Starting round	Final position	Record							
Competition	First match	Last match	Starting round	Final position	Pld	W	D	L	GF	GA	GD	Win %
Bundesliga	16 August 2019	27 June 2020	Matchday 1	Winners	34	26	4	4	100	32	+68	76.47
DFB-Pokal	12 August 2019	4 July 2020	First round	Winners	6	6	0	0	16	8	+8	100.00
DFL-Supercup	3 August 2019		Final	Runners Up	1	0	0	1	0	2	−2	0.00
Champions League	18 September 2019	23 August 2020	Group stage	Winners	11	11	0	0	43	8	+35	100.00
Total					52	43	4	5	159	50	+109	82.69

Source: Competitions

=== Bundesliga ===
==== League table ====
Pos	Team	Pld	W	D	L	GF	GA	GD	Pts	Qualification or relegation
1	Bayern Munich (C)	34	26	4	4	100	32	+68	82	Qualification for the Champions League group stage
2	Borussia Dortmund	34	21	6	7	84	41	+43	69	Qualification for the Champions League group stage
3	RB Leipzig	34	18	12	4	81	37	+44	66	Qualification for the Champions League group stage
4	Borussia Mönchengladbach	34	20	5	9	66	40	+26	65	Qualification for the Champions League group stage
5	Bayer Leverkusen	34	19	6	9	61	44	+17	63	Qualification for the Europa League group stage (Note: Since the winners of the 2019–20 DFB-Pokal, Bayern Munich, qualified for the Champions League based on league position, the Europa League group stage spot was passed to the sixth-placed team, and the Europa League second qualifying round spot was passed to the seventh-placed team.)

Source: DFB
Rules for classification: 1) Points; 2) Goal difference; 3) Goals scored; 4) Head-to-head results; 5) Head-to-head away goals scored; 6) Away goals scored; 7) Play-off.
(C) Champions

==== Results summary ====
Overall								Home						Away					
Pld	W	D	L	GF	GA	GD	Pts	W	D	L	GF	GA	GD	W	D	L	GF	GA	GD
34	26	4	4	100	32	+68	82	13	2	2	53	15	+38	13	2	2	47	17	+30

Source: Bundesliga

==== Results by round ====
Round	1	2	3	4	5	6	7	8	9	10	11	12	13	14	15	16	17	18	19	20	21	22	23	24	25	26	27	28	29	30	31	32	33	34
Ground	H	A	H	A	H	A	H	A	H	A	H	A	H	A	H	A	H	A	H	A	H	A	H	A	H	A	H	A	H	A	H	A	H	A
Result	D	W	W	D	W	W	L	D	W	L	W	W	L	L	W	W	W	W	W	W	D	W	W	W	W	W	W	W	W	W	W	W	W	W
Position	8	6	2	4	2	1	3	3	2	4	3	3	4	7	5	3	3	2	2	1	1	1	1	1	1	1	1	1	1	1	1	1	1	1

Source: DFB
A = Away; H = Home; W = Win; D = Draw; L = Loss

==== Matches ====
The Bundesliga schedule was announced on 28 June 2019.

16 August 2019 1	Bayern Munich	2–2	Hertha BSC	Munich
20:30 CEST (UTC+2)	Lewandowski 24', 60' (pen.), (yellow card) 76'; Müller (yellow card) 71'; Pavard (yellow card) 75'	Report	Darida (yellow card) 17'; Lukebakio 36'; Grujić 38', (yellow card) 59'; Mittelstädt (yellow card) 90+1'	Stadium: Allianz Arena; Attendance: 75,000; Referee: Harm Osmers

24 August 2019 2	Schalke 04	0–3	Bayern Munich	Gelsenkirchen
18:30 CEST (UTC+2)		Report	Lewandowski 20' (pen.), 50', 75'	Stadium: Veltins-Arena; Attendance: 62,271; Referee: Marco Fritz

31 August 2019 3	Bayern Munich	6–1	Mainz 05	Munich
15:30 CEST (UTC+2)	Kimmich (yellow card) 20'; Pavard 36'; Alaba 45'; Perišić 54'; Coman 64'; Hernandez (yellow card) 73'; Thiago (yellow card) 75'; Lewandowski 78'; Davies 80'	Report	Boëtius 6'; Niakhaté (yellow card) 33'; Hack (yellow card) 45'; Kunde (yellow card) 77'	Stadium: Allianz Arena; Attendance: 75,000; Referee: Markus Schmidt

14 September 2019 4	RB Leipzig	1–1	Bayern Munich	Leipzig
18:30 CEST (UTC+2)	Halstenberg (yellow card) 26'; Forsberg 45+3' (pen.); Nkunku (yellow card) 78'; Laimer (yellow card) 80'; Sabitzer (yellow card) 90+2'	Report	Lewandowski 3', (yellow card) 26'; Boateng (yellow card) 57'	Stadium: Red Bull Arena; Attendance: 42,146; Referee: Sascha Stegemann

21 September 2019 5	Bayern Munich	4–0	1. FC Köln	Munich
15:30 CEST (UTC+2)	Lewandowski 3', 48'; Boateng (yellow card) 31'; Coutinho 62' (pen.); Hernandez (yellow card) 67'; Perišić 73'; Martínez (yellow card) 74'; Cuisance (yellow card) 83'	Report	Ehizibue (red card) 59'	Stadium: Allianz Arena; Attendance: 75,000; Referee: Patrick Ittrich

28 September 2019 6	SC Paderborn	2–3	Bayern Munich	Paderborn
15:30 CEST (UTC+2)	Pröger 68'; Collins 84'; Vasiliadis (yellow card) 90+3'	Report	Gnabry 15'; Süle (yellow card) 43'; Coutinho 55'; Lewandowski 79'	Stadium: Benteler-Arena; Attendance: 15,000; Referee: Felix Zwayer

5 October 2019 7	Bayern Munich	1–2	1899 Hoffenheim	Munich
15:30 CEST (UTC+2)	Thiago (yellow card) 45+3'; Lewandowski 73'; Perišić (yellow card) 90+5'	Report	Adamyan 54', 79'	Stadium: Allianz Arena; Attendance: 75,000; Referee: Tobias Stieler

19 October 2019 8	FC Augsburg	2–2	Bayern Munich	Augsburg
15:30 CEST (UTC+2)	Richter 1', (yellow card) 63'; Khedira (yellow card) 73'; Finnbogason 90+1'; Koubek (yellow card) 90+4'	Report	Lewandowski 14'; Kimmich (yellow card) 37'; Thiago (yellow card) 42'; Gnabry 49'; Martínez (yellow card) 84'	Stadium: WWK Arena; Attendance: 30,660; Referee: Daniel Siebert

26 October 2019 9	Bayern Munich	2–1	Union Berlin	Munich
15:30 CEST (UTC+2)	Pavard 13'; Lewandowski 53'	Report	Andrich (yellow card) 17'; Polter 86' (pen.)	Stadium: Allianz Arena; Attendance: 75,000; Referee: Marco Fritz

2 November 2019 10	Eintracht Frankfurt	5–1	Bayern Munich	Frankfurt
15:30 CET (UTC+1)	Kostić 25'; Sow 33'; Abraham 49'; Hinteregger 61'; Paciência 85'; Kamada (yellow card) 87'	Report	Boateng (red card) 9'; Lewandowski 37'; Ulreich (yellow card) 51'; Kimmich (yellow card) 72'	Stadium: Commerzbank-Arena; Attendance: 51,500; Referee: Markus Schmidt

9 November 2019 11	Bayern Munich	4–0	Borussia Dortmund	Munich
18:30 CET (UTC+1)	Lewandowski 17', 76'; Gnabry 47'; Coman (yellow card) 67'; Hummels 80' (o.g.); Kimmich (yellow card) 90'	Report	Reus (yellow card) 63'	Stadium: Allianz Arena; Attendance: 75,000; Referee: Felix Zwayer

23 November 2019 12	Fortuna Düsseldorf	0–4	Bayern Munich	Düsseldorf
15:30 CET (UTC+1)	Hennings (yellow card) 36'	Report	Pavard 11'; Martínez (yellow card) 22'; Tolisso 27'; Gnabry 34'; Coutinho 70'	Stadium: Merkur Spiel-Arena; Attendance: 53,000; Referee: Frank Willenborg

30 November 2019 13	Bayern Munich	1–2	Bayer Leverkusen	Munich
18:30 CET (UTC+1)	Müller 34'; Goretzka (yellow card) 90+6'	Report	Bailey 10', 35'; Baumgartlinger (yellow card) 42'; Tah (red card) 81'; Bellarabi (yellow card) 90+3'; S. Bender (yellow card) 90+4'	Stadium: Allianz Arena; Attendance: 75,000; Referee: Guido Winkmann

7 December 2019 14	Borussia Mönchengladbach	2–1	Bayern Munich	Mönchengladbach
15:30 CET (UTC+1)	Bénes (yellow card) 6'; Bensebaini 60', 90+2' (pen.); Hofmann (yellow card) 66'; Zakaria (yellow card) 88'	Report	Perišić 49'; Boateng (yellow card) 62'; Martínez (yellow card) 82' (yellow-red card) 90+1'; Lewandowski (yellow card) 86'; Thiago (yellow card) 90+2'	Stadium: Borussia-Park; Attendance: 54,022; Referee: Marco Fritz

14 December 2019 15	Bayern Munich	6–1	Werder Bremen	Munich
15:30 CET (UTC+1)	Pavard (yellow card) 16'; Boateng (yellow card) 18'; Coutinho 45', 63', 78'; Lewandowski 45+4', 72'; Müller 75'	Report	Groß (yellow card) 22'; Rashica 24'; Friedl (yellow card) 62'	Stadium: Allianz Arena; Attendance: 75,000; Referee: Robert Schröder

18 December 2019 16	SC Freiburg	1–3	Bayern Munich	Freiburg
20:30 CET (UTC+1)	Grifo 59'	Report	Lewandowski 16', (yellow card) 69'; Müller (yellow card) 50'; Thiago (yellow card) 90'; Zirkzee 90+2'; Gnabry 90+5'	Stadium: Schwarzwald-Stadion; Attendance: 24,000; Referee: Sascha Stegemann

21 December 2019 17	Bayern Munich	2–0	VfL Wolfsburg	Munich
15:30 CET (UTC+1)	Kimmich (yellow card) 47'; Müller (yellow card) 76'; Zirkzee 86'; Gnabry 89'	Report	Otávio (yellow card) 67'; Arnold (yellow card) 71'	Stadium: Allianz Arena; Attendance: 75,000; Referee: Christian Dingert

19 January 2020 18	Hertha BSC	0–4	Bayern Munich	Berlin
15:30 CET (UTC+1)	Darida (yellow card) 7'; Jarstein (yellow card) 64'; Boyata (yellow card) 81'	Report	Pavard (yellow card) 19'; Müller 60'; Lewandowski 73' (pen.); Thiago 75'; Perišić 84'	Stadium: Olympiastadion; Attendance: 74,667; Referee: Tobias Stieler

25 January 2020 19	Bayern Munich	5–0	Schalke 04	Munich
18:30 CET (UTC+1)	Lewandowski 6'; Müller 45+2'; Goretzka 50'; Thiago 58'; Gnabry 89'	Report		Stadium: Allianz Arena; Attendance: 75,000; Referee: Manuel Gräfe

1 February 2020 20	Mainz 05	1–3	Bayern Munich	Mainz
15:30 CET (UTC+1)	St. Juste 45', (yellow card) 57'; Boëtius (yellow card) 87'; Latza (yellow card) 88'	Report	Lewandowski 8'; Müller 14'; Thiago 26'; Goretzka (yellow card) 65'	Stadium: Opel Arena; Attendance: 33,305; Referee: Bastian Dankert

9 February 2020 21	Bayern Munich	0–0	RB Leipzig	Munich
18:00 CET (UTC+1)	Kimmich (yellow card) 57'; Pavard (yellow card) 90+3'	Report	Laimer (yellow card) 36'; Upamecano (yellow card) 50'	Stadium: Allianz Arena; Attendance: 75,000; Referee: Marco Fritz

16 February 2020 22	1. FC Köln	1–4	Bayern Munich	Cologne
15:30 CET (UTC+1)	Uth 70'; Bornauw (yellow card) 78'	Report	Lewandowski 3'; Coman 5'; Gnabry 12', 66'; Boateng (yellow card) 28'; Thiago (yellow card) 49'; Pavard (yellow card) 82'	Stadium: RheinEnergieStadion; Attendance: 50,000; Referee: Felix Zwayer

21 February 2020 23	Bayern Munich	3–2	SC Paderborn	Munich
20:30 CET (UTC+1)	Gnabry 25'; Lucas (yellow card) 54'; Lewandowski 70', 88'	Report	Gjasula (yellow card) 34'; Srbeny 44'; Michel (yellow card) 61', (goal) 75'; Antwi-Adjei (yellow card) 84'	Stadium: Allianz Arena; Attendance: 75,000; Referee: Markus Schmidt

29 February 2020 24	1899 Hoffenheim	0–6	Bayern Munich	Sinsheim
15:30 CET (UTC+1)		Report	Gnabry 2'; Kimmich 7'; Zirkzee 15'; Coutinho 33', 47'; Goretzka 62'	Stadium: PreZero Arena; Attendance: 30,150; Referee: Christian Dingert

8 March 2020 25	Bayern Munich	2–0	FC Augsburg	Munich
15:30 CET (UTC+1)	Müller 53'; Thiago (yellow card) 85'; Goretzka 90+1'	Report		Stadium: Allianz Arena; Attendance: 75,000; Referee: Bibiana Steinhaus

17 May 2020 26	Union Berlin	0–2	Bayern Munich	Berlin
18:00 CEST (UTC+2)	Lenz (yellow card) 12'; Schlotterbeck (yellow card) 51'	Report	Davies (yellow card) 37'; Lewandowski 40' (pen.); Pavard 80'	Stadium: Stadion An der Alten Försterei; Attendance: 0 Referee: Bastian Dankert
Note: The match was postponed on 13 March due to the pandemic of COVID-19 in Germany, and rescheduled to 17 May.

23 May 2020 27	Bayern Munich	5–2	Eintracht Frankfurt	Munich
18:30 CEST (UTC+2)	Goretzka 17'; Müller 41'; Lewandowski 46'; Davies 61'; Hinteregger 74' (o.g.)	Report	Hinteregger (yellow card) 35', (goal) 52', 55'	Stadium: Allianz Arena; Attendance: 0 Referee: Marco Fritz
Note: The match was postponed on 13 March due to the pandemic of COVID-19 in Germany, and rescheduled to 23 May.

26 May 2020 28	Borussia Dortmund	0–1	Bayern Munich	Dortmund
18:30 CEST (UTC+2)	Hummels (yellow card) 13'; Dahoud (yellow card) 67'	Report	Kimmich 43'; Müller (yellow card) 66'; Davies (yellow card) 74'	Stadium: Signal Iduna Park; Attendance: 0 Referee: Tobias Stieler
Note: The match was postponed on 24 March due to the pandemic of COVID-19 in Germany, and rescheduled to 26 May.

30 May 2020 29	Bayern Munich	5–0	Fortuna Düsseldorf	Munich
18:30 CEST (UTC+2)	Jørgensen 15' (o.g.); Pavard 29'; Lewandowski 43', 50'; Davies 52'	Report	Karaman (yellow card) 26'; Gießelmann (yellow card) 88'; Suttner (yellow card) 90'	Stadium: Allianz Arena; Attendance: 0 Referee: Robert Hartmann
Note: The match was postponed on 24 March due to the pandemic of COVID-19 in Germany, and rescheduled to 30 May.

6 June 2020 30	Bayer Leverkusen	2–4	Bayern Munich	Leverkusen
15:30 CEST (UTC+2)	Alario 10'; Amiri (yellow card) 30'; Bellarabi (yellow card) 35'; Dragović (yellow card) 74'; Wirtz 89'	Report	Coman (yellow card) 8', (goal) 27'; Lewandowski (yellow card) 32', (goal) 66'; Müller (yellow card) 40'; Goretzka 42'; Gnabry 45'	Stadium: BayArena; Attendance: 0 Referee: Manuel Gräfe
Note: The match was postponed on 24 March due to the pandemic of COVID-19 in Germany, and rescheduled to 6 June.

13 June 2020 31	Bayern Munich	2–1	Borussia Mönchengladbach	Munich
18:30 CEST (UTC+2)	Zirkzee 26'; Goretzka 86'	Report	Pavard 37' (o.g.); Bensebaini (yellow card) 45'; Lainer (yellow card) 69'	Stadium: Allianz Arena; Attendance: 0 Referee: Felix Zwayer
Note: The match was postponed on 24 March due to the pandemic of COVID-19 in Germany, and rescheduled to 13 June.

16 June 2020 32	Werder Bremen	0–1	Bayern Munich	Bremen
20:30 CEST (UTC+2)	Eggestein (yellow card) 56'; Langkamp (yellow card) 88'	Report	Davies (yellow card) 19' (yellow-red card) 79'; Lewandowski 43'; Kimmich (yellow card) 89'	Stadium: Wohninvest Weserstadion; Attendance: 0 Referee: Harm Osmers
Note: The match was postponed on 24 March due to the pandemic of COVID-19 in Germany, and rescheduled to 16 June.

20 June 2020 33	Bayern Munich	3–1	SC Freiburg	Munich
15:30 CEST (UTC+2)	Kimmich 15'; Lewandowski 24', 37'	Report	Höler 33'	Stadium: Allianz Arena; Attendance: 0 Referee: Sören Storks
Note: The match was postponed on 24 March due to the pandemic of COVID-19 in Germany, and rescheduled to 20 June.

27 June 2020 34	VfL Wolfsburg	0–4	Bayern Munich	Wolfsburg
15:30 CEST (UTC+2)	Weghorst (yellow card) 15'; Guilavogui (yellow card) 66' (yellow-red card) 71'	Report	Coman 4'; Cuisance 37'; Lewandowski 72' (pen.); Müller 79'	Stadium: Volkswagen Arena; Attendance: 0 Referee: Patrick Ittrich
Note: The match was postponed on 7 May due to the pandemic of COVID-19 in Germany, and rescheduled to 27 June.

=== DFB-Pokal ===
12 August 2019 First round	Energie Cottbus	1–3	Bayern Munich	Cottbus
20:45 CEST (UTC+2)	Hasse (yellow card) 51'; Eisenhuth (yellow card) 57'; Taz 90+3' (pen.)	Report	Lewandowski 32'; Thiago (yellow card) 45+1'; Kimmich (yellow card) 50'; Coman 64'; Goretzka 85'	Stadium: Stadion der Freundschaft; Attendance: 20,602; Referee: Bastian Dankert

29 October 2019 Second round	VfL Bochum	1–2	Bayern Munich	Bochum
20:00 CET (UTC+1)	Lee Chung-yong (yellow card) 30'; Davies 35' (o.g.); Losilla (yellow card) 50'; Bella-Kotchap (red card) 88'	Report	Gnabry 83'; Müller 89'	Stadium: Vonovia Ruhrstadion; Attendance: 26,600; Referee: Robert Schröder

5 February 2020 Round of 16	Bayern Munich	4–3	1899 Hoffenheim	Munich
20:45 CET (UTC+1)	Hübner 12' (o.g.); Müller 20'; Lewandowski 36', 80'; Tolisso (yellow card) 40'; Pavard (yellow card) 55'; Alaba (yellow card) 84'	Report	Boateng 8' (o.g.); Nordtveit (yellow card) 31'; Dabbur 82', 90+2'	Stadium: Allianz Arena; Attendance: 71,500; Referee: Sascha Stegemann

3 March 2020 Quarter-finals	Schalke 04	0–1	Bayern Munich	Gelsenkirchen
20:45 CET (UTC+1)	Nastasić (yellow card) 66'; Burgstaller (yellow card) 66'; McKennie (yellow card) 86'; Raman (yellow card) 90'	Report	Kimmich 40'	Stadium: Veltins-Arena; Attendance: 62,271; Referee: Tobias Stieler

10 June 2020 Semi-finals	Bayern Munich	2–1	Eintracht Frankfurt	Munich
20:45 CEST (UTC+2)	Perišić 14', (yellow card) 44'; Lewandowski 74'; Hernandez (yellow card) 90+3'	Report	Da Costa 69'; Silva (yellow card) 88'; Hinteregger (yellow card) 90+3'	Stadium: Allianz Arena; Attendance: 0 Referee: Marco Fritz
Note: The match was postponed on 27 March due to the pandemic of COVID-19 in Germany, and rescheduled to 10 June.

4 July 2020 Final	Bayer Leverkusen	2–4	Bayern Munich	Berlin
20:00 CEST (UTC+2)	Wendell (yellow card) 28'; S. Bender 63'; Havertz 90+5' (pen.)	Report	Alaba 16'; Gnabry 24'; Lewandowski 59', 89', (yellow card) 67'	Stadium: Olympiastadion; Attendance: 0 Referee: Tobias Welz
Note: The match originally scheduled for 23 May, was postponed on 24 April due to the pandemic of COVID-19 in Germany, and rescheduled to 4 July.

=== DFL-Supercup ===
3 August 2019 Final	Borussia Dortmund	2–0	Bayern Munich	Dortmund
20:30 CEST (UTC+2)	Alcácer 48'; Sancho 69'	Report	Lewandowski (yellow card) 59'; Kimmich (yellow card) 77'	Stadium: Signal Iduna Park; Attendance: 81,365; Referee: Daniel Siebert

=== UEFA Champions League ===
==== Group stage ====
Pos	Team	Pld	W	D	L	GF	GA	GD	Pts	Qualification	BAY	TOT	OLY	RSB
1	(Germany) Bayern Munich	6	6	0	0	24	5	+19	18	Advance to knockout phase	—	3–1	2–0	3–0
2	(England) Tottenham Hotspur	6	3	1	2	18	14	+4	10	Advance to knockout phase	2–7	—	4–2	5–0
3	(Greece) Olympiacos	6	1	1	4	8	14	−6	4	Transfer to Europa League	2–3	2–2	—	1–0
4	(Serbia) Red Star Belgrade	6	1	0	5	3	20	−17	3		0–6	0–4	3–1	—

Source: UEFA
Rules for classification: Group stage tiebreakers

18 September 2019 1	Bayern Munich (Germany)	3–0	(Serbia) Red Star Belgrade	Munich, Germany
21:00 CEST (UTC+2)	Coman 34'; Lewandowski 80'; Müller 90+1'	Report	Degenek (yellow card) 51'; Vulić (yellow card) 90'	Stadium: Allianz Arena; Attendance: 70,000; Referee: Bobby Madden (Scotland)

1 October 2019 2	Tottenham Hotspur (England)	2–7	(Germany) Bayern Munich	London, England
20:00 BST (UTC+1); 21:00 CEST (UTC+2)	Son Heung-min 12'; Ndombele (yellow card) 42'; Kane (yellow card) 46', (goal) 61' (pen.)	Report	Kimmich 15'; Gnabry (yellow card) 25', (goal) 53', 55', 83', 88'; Lewandowski 45', 87'	Stadium: Tottenham Hotspur Stadium; Attendance: 60,127; Referee: Clément Turpin (France)

22 October 2019 3	Olympiacos (Greece)	2–3	(Germany) Bayern Munich	Piraeus, Greece
22:00 EEST (UTC+3); 21:00 CEST (UTC+2)	El-Arabi 23', (yellow card) 89'; Semedo (yellow card) 73'; Guilherme 79'	Report	Lewandowski 34', 62'; Thiago (yellow card) 50'; Neuer (yellow card) 71'; Tolisso 75'	Stadium: Karaiskakis Stadium; Attendance: 31,670; Referee: Danny Makkelie (Netherlands)

6 November 2019 4	Bayern Munich (Germany)	2–0	(Greece) Olympiacos	Munich, Germany
18:55 CET (UTC+1)	Lewandowski 69'; Perišić 89'	Report		Stadium: Allianz Arena; Attendance: 63,646; Referee: Paweł Raczkowski (Poland)

26 November 2019 5	Red Star Belgrade (Serbia)	0–6	(Germany) Bayern Munich	Belgrade, Serbia
21:00 CET (UTC+1)	Milunović (yellow card) 7'	Report	Goretzka 14'; Lewandowski 53' (pen.), 60', 64', 68'; Tolisso 90'	Stadium: Red Star Stadium; Attendance: 44,118; Referee: Björn Kuipers (Netherlands)

11 December 2019 6	Bayern Munich (Germany)	3–1	(England) Tottenham Hotspur	Munich, Germany
21:00 CET (UTC+1)	Coman 14'; Kimmich (yellow card) 36'; Müller 45'; Coutinho 64'	Report	Sessegnon 20'; Lo Celso (yellow card) 36'	Stadium: Allianz Arena; Attendance: 66,353; Referee: Gianluca Rocchi (Italy)

==== Knockout phase ====
25 February 2020 Round of 16; First leg	Chelsea (England)	0–3	(Germany) Bayern Munich	London, England
20:00 GMT (UTC±0); 21:00 CET (UTC+1)	Jorginho (yellow card) 49'; Alonso (red card) 83'	Report	Thiago (yellow card) 45+1'; Kimmich (yellow card) 50'; Gnabry 51', 54'; Lewandowski 76'	Stadium: Stamford Bridge; Attendance: 36,761; Referee: Clément Turpin (France)

8 August 2020 Round of 16; Second leg	Bayern Munich (Germany)	4–1 (7–1 agg.)	(England) Chelsea	Munich, Germany
21:00 CEST (UTC+2)	Lewandowski 10' (pen.), 84'; Perišić 24'; Tolisso 76'	Report	Caballero (yellow card) 8'; Emerson (yellow card) 43'; Abraham 43'	Stadium: Allianz Arena; Attendance: 0 Referee: Ovidiu Hațegan (Romania)
Note: The match between Bayern Munich and Chelsea in Munich was meant to be played behind closed doors due to an outbreak of COVID-19 in Germany. However, on 13 March, the match was indefinitely postponed due to a pandemic of COVID-19 in Germany. The match was rescheduled on 17 June to 8 August.

14 August 2020 Quarter-finals	Barcelona (Spain)	2–8	(Germany) Bayern Munich	Lisbon, Portugal
21:00 CEST (UTC+2)	Alaba 7' (o.g.); Suárez (yellow card) 54', (goal) 57'; Alba (yellow card) 60'; Vidal (yellow card) 90+2'	Report	Müller 4', 31'; Perišić 22'; Gnabry 27'; Boateng (yellow card) 42'; Davies (yellow card) 52'; Kimmich 63', (yellow card) 85'; Lewandowski 82'; Coutinho 85', 89'	Stadium: Estádio da Luz; Attendance: 0 Referee: Damir Skomina (Slovenia)

19 August 2020 Semi-finals	Lyon (France)	0–3	(Germany) Bayern Munich	Lisbon, Portugal
21:00 CEST (UTC+2)	Marcelo (yellow card) 35'; Marçal (yellow card) 42'; Mendes (yellow card) 86'	Report	Gnabry 18', 33'; Lewandowski 88'	Stadium: Estádio José Alvalade; Attendance: 0 Referee: Antonio Mateu Lahoz (Spain)

23 August 2020 Final	Paris Saint-Germain (France)	0–1	(Germany) Bayern Munich	Lisbon, Portugal
21:00 CEST (UTC+2)	Paredes (yellow card) 52'; Neymar (yellow card) 81'; Thiago Silva (yellow card) 84'; Kurzawa (yellow card) 86'	Report	Davies (yellow card) 28'; Gnabry (yellow card) 52'; Süle (yellow card) 56'; Coman 59'; Müller (yellow card) 90+4'	Stadium: Estádio da Luz; Attendance: 0 Referee: Daniele Orsato (Italy)

== Statistics ==
=== Appearances and goals ===
No.	Pos	Nat	Player	Total		Bundesliga		DFB-Pokal		DFL-Supercup		Champions League	
No.	Pos	Nat	Player	Apps	Goals	Apps	Goals	Apps	Goals	Apps	Goals	Apps	Goals
Goalkeepers
1	GK	(Germany) GER	Manuel Neuer	51	0	33	0	6	0	1	0	11	0
26	GK	(Germany) GER	Sven Ulreich	1	0	1	0	0	0	0	0	0	0
36	GK	(Germany) GER	Christian Früchtl	0	0	0	0	0	0	0	0	0	0
39	GK	(Germany) GER	Ron-Thorben Hoffmann	0	0	0	0	0	0	0	0	0	0
Defenders
2	DF	(Spain) ESP	Álvaro Odriozola	5	0	2+1	0	0+1	0	0	0	0+1	0
4	DF	(Germany) GER	Niklas Süle	16	0	8	0	1	0	1	0	2+4	0
5	DF	(France) FRA	Benjamin Pavard	47	4	31+1	4	6	0	0+1	0	7+1	0
8	DF	(Spain) ESP	Javi Martínez	24	0	6+10	0	0+1	0	0	0	4+3	0
17	DF	(Germany) GER	Jérôme Boateng	38	0	23+1	0	4	0	1	0	8+1	0
19	DF	(Canada) CAN	Alphonso Davies	43	3	24+5	3	5	0	0+1	0	8	0
21	DF	(France) FRA	Lucas Hernandez	25	0	11+8	0	0+3	0	0	0	2+1	0
27	DF	(Austria) AUT	David Alaba	42	2	27+1	1	5	1	1	0	8	0
33	DF	(Germany) GER	Lars Lukas Mai	0	0	0	0	0	0	0	0	0	0
41	DF	(United States) USA	Chris Richards	1	0	0+1	0	0	0	0	0	0	0
43	DF	(Germany) GER	Bright Arrey-Mbi	0	0	0	0	0	0	0	0	0	0
Midfielders
6	MF	(Spain) ESP	Thiago	40	3	20+4	3	3+2	0	1	0	9+1	0
10	MF	(Brazil) BRA	Philippe Coutinho	38	11	15+8	8	2+2	0	0	0	5+6	3
11	MF	(France) FRA	Michaël Cuisance	10	1	3+6	1	0+1	0	0	0	0	0
14	MF	(Croatia) CRO	Ivan Perišić	35	8	11+11	4	2+1	1	0	0	5+5	3
16	MF	(Germany) GER	Leon Dajaku	2	0	0+2	0	0	0	0	0	0	0
18	MF	(Germany) GER	Leon Goretzka	38	8	17+7	6	4+1	1	1	0	6+2	1
22	MF	(Germany) GER	Serge Gnabry	46	23	26+5	12	4+1	2	0	0	9+1	9
24	MF	(France) FRA	Corentin Tolisso	28	4	7+6	1	4	0	1	0	3+7	3
25	MF	(Germany) GER	Thomas Müller	50	14	26+7	8	5+1	2	1	0	7+3	4
28	MF	(New Zealand) NZL	Sarpreet Singh	2	0	1+1	0	0	0	0	0	0	0
29	MF	(France) FRA	Kingsley Coman	38	8	17+7	4	4	1	1	0	7+2	3
32	MF	(Germany) GER	Joshua Kimmich	51	7	32+1	4	6	1	1	0	10+1	2
34	MF	(Brazil) BRA	Oliver Batista Meier	1	0	0+1	0	0	0	0	0	0	0
37	MF	(Germany) GER	Paul Will	0	0	0	0	0	0	0	0	0	0
40	MF	(Germany) GER	Malik Tillman	0	0	0	0	0	0	0	0	0	0
42	MF	(Germany) GER	Jamal Musiala	1	0	0+1	0	0	0	0	0	0	0
Forwards
9	FW	(Poland) POL	Robert Lewandowski	47	55	31	34	4+1	6	1	0	10	15
15	FW	(Germany) GER	Jann-Fiete Arp	0	0	0	0	0	0	0	0	0	0
35	FW	(Netherlands) NED	Joshua Zirkzee	12	4	3+6	4	0+2	0	0	0	0+1	0
Players transferred out during the season
30	FW	(South Korea) KOR	Jeong Woo-yeong	0	0	0	0	0	0	0	0	0	0
35	MF	(Portugal) POR	Renato Sanches	3	0	0+1	0	1	0	0+1	0	0	0
38	FW	(Ghana) GHA	Kwasi Okyere Wriedt	1	0	0+1	0	0	0	0	0	0	0

Source: Competitions

=== Goalscorers ===
Rank	Position	Player	Bundesliga	DFB-Pokal	DFL-Supercup	Champions League	Total
1	FW	(Poland) Robert Lewandowski	34	6	0	15	55
2	FW	(Germany) Serge Gnabry	12	2	0	9	23
3	FW	(Germany) Thomas Müller	8	2	0	4	14
4	MF	(Brazil) Philippe Coutinho	8	0	0	3	11
5	MF	(Germany) Leon Goretzka	6	1	0	1	8
5	MF	(Croatia) Ivan Perišić	4	1	0	3	8
5	MF	(France) Kingsley Coman	4	1	0	3	8
8	MF	(Germany) Joshua Kimmich	4	1	0	2	7
9	DF	(France) Benjamin Pavard	4	0	0	0	4
9	MF	(France) Corentin Tolisso	1	0	0	3	4
9	FW	(Netherlands) Joshua Zirkzee	4	0	0	0	4
12	DF	(Canada) Alphonso Davies	3	0	0	0	3
12	MF	(Spain) Thiago	3	0	0	0	3
14	DF	(Austria) David Alaba	1	1	0	0	2
15	DF	(France) Michaël Cuisance	1	0	0	0	1
Own goals			3	1	0	0	4
Total			100	16	0	43	159
