= Álvaro Odriozola =

Spanish footballer (born 1995)

- Odriozola with Real Sociedad in 2025

Personal information
- Full name: Álvaro Odriozola Arzallus
- Date of birth: 14 December 1995 (age 30)
- Place of birth: San Sebastián, Spain
- Height: 1.75 m (5 ft 9 in)
- Position: Right-back

Team information
- Current team: Real Sociedad
- Number: 20

Youth career
- Marianistas
- 2006–2014: Real Sociedad

Senior career*
Years	Team	Apps	(Gls)
2013–2017	Real Sociedad B	86	(3)
2017–2018	Real Sociedad	50	(0)
2018–2023	Real Madrid	34	(2)
2020	→ Bayern Munich (loan)	3	(0)
2021–2022	→ Fiorentina (loan)	25	(1)
2023–	Real Sociedad	16	(1)

International career^{‡}
2017	Spain U21	3	(0)
2017–2018	Spain	4	(1)
Medal record
Men's football
Representing Spain
UEFA European Under-21 Championship
Runner-up	2017 Poland	Team
- * Club domestic league appearances and goals as of 16:04, 21 February 2026 (UTC) ‡ National team caps and goals as of 9 June 2018

Álvaro Odriozola Arzallus (Spanish pronunciation: [ˈalβaɾo oðɾjoˈθola]; born 14 December 1995) is a Spanish professional footballer who plays as a right-back for La Liga club Real Sociedad.

== Club career ==
=== Real Sociedad ===
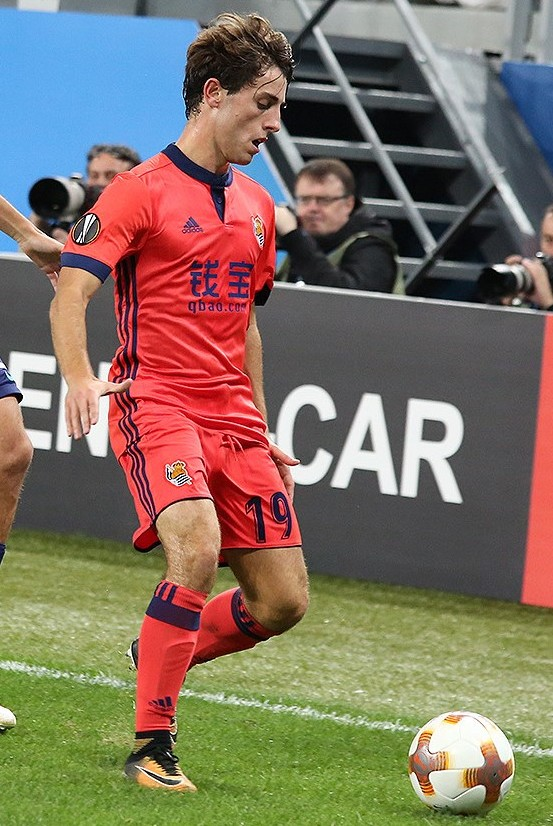
Odriozola with Real Sociedad in 2017

Born in San Sebastián, Basque Country, Odriozola joined Real Sociedad's youth setup in 2006, at the age of ten. On 1 September 2013 he made his senior debut with the reserves, starting in a 3–0 Segunda División B away loss against UD Las Palmas Atlético, and in the same month made the first of several appearances in the UEFA Youth League.

Odriozola was promoted to the B-side ahead of the 2014–15 season, and scored his first goal on 6 September 2014 by netting the last in a 3–0 home win against Real Unión. On 25 February 2016, he renewed his contract with Sanse until 2018.

On 16 January 2017, as both Carlos Martínez and Joseba Zaldúa were injured, Odriozola made his first-team – and La Liga – debut by starting in a 2–0 away win against Málaga CF. Up to the end of the campaign, he played in a further 16 competitive matches.

Odriozola renewed his contract until 2022 on 10 June 2017, and was definitively promoted to the senior squad ahead of the 2017–18 season, quickly becoming the first-choice right-back. He scored his first professional goal on 15 February 2018, in the 2–2 draw with FC Red Bull Salzburg in the UEFA Europa League round of 32 at Anoeta Stadium.

=== Real Madrid ===
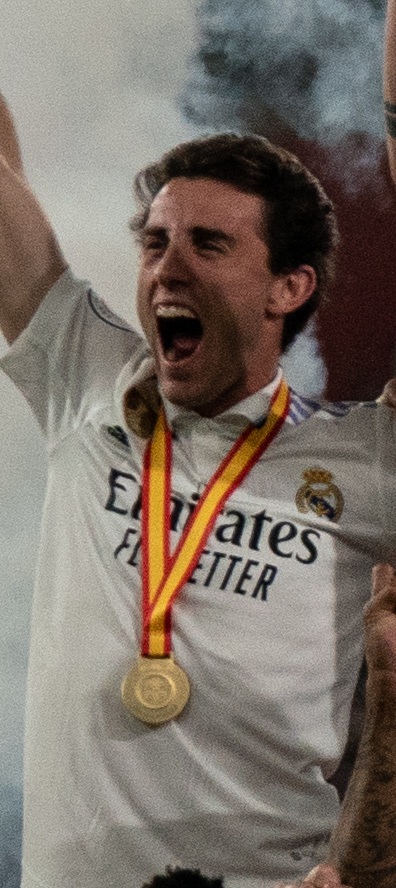
Odriozola with Real Madrid, celebrating the win of the 2023 Copa del Rey

On 5 July 2018, Real Madrid reached an agreement with Real Sociedad for the transfer of Odriozola. The fee was reported to be €30 million, plus €5 million of conditional add-ons. He made his debut on 22 September, playing the full 90 minutes in a 1–0 win over RCD Espanyol. Odriozola scored his first league goal on 21 April 2021, scoring the second goal in a 3–0 win over Cádiz.

==== Loan to Bayern Munich ====
After playing just five times for Madrid during the first half of 2019–20. In January 2020, Odriozola was loaned to Bundesliga club Bayern Munich for the remainder of the season. On 23 August 2020, he won the 2019–20 UEFA Champions League with Bayern Munich.

==== Loan to Fiorentina ====
On 28 August 2021, Odriozola joined Serie A club Fiorentina on a season-long loan deal.

=== Return to Real Sociedad ===
On 1 September 2023, Real Sociedad announced the return of Odriozola on a six-year contract.

== International career ==
Odriozola was first selected to play for Spain under-21s by Albert Celades, helping the squad reach the final of the 2017 UEFA European Championship. He earned his first full cap for Spain on 6 October 2017, in a 3–0 win over Albania for the 2018 FIFA World Cup qualifiers; he played the entire match, and also provided an assist for Thiago Alcântara's goal as the team reached the finals as group winners.

Odriozola was named in the 23-man squad for the finals in Russia. He scored his first goal for his country on 3 June 2018, in a 1–1 friendly draw with Switzerland in Villarreal.

== Career statistics ==
=== Club ===
As of match played 21 February 2026

Appearances and goals by club, season and competition
Club	Season	League			National cup		Europe		Other		Total	
Club	Season	Division	Apps	Goals	Apps	Goals	Apps	Goals	Apps	Goals	Apps	Goals
Real Sociedad B	2013–14	Segunda División B	9	0	—		—		—		9	0
Real Sociedad B	2014–15	Segunda División B	27	1	—		—		—		27	1
Real Sociedad B	2015–16	Segunda División B	32	2	—		—		—		32	2
Real Sociedad B	2016–17	Segunda División B	18	0	—		—		—		18	0
Real Sociedad B	Total		86	3	0	0	0	0	0	0	86	3
Real Sociedad	2016–17	La Liga	15	0	1	0	—		—		16	0
Real Sociedad	2017–18	La Liga	35	0	0	0	6 (Note: Appearance(s) in UEFA Europa League)	1	—		41	1
Real Sociedad	Total		50	0	1	0	6	1	0	0	57	1
Real Madrid	2018–19	La Liga	14	0	5	1	3 (Note: Appearance(s) in UEFA Champions League)	0	0	0	22	1
Real Madrid	2019–20	La Liga	4	0	0	0	1	0	0	0	5	0
Real Madrid	2020–21	La Liga	13	2	1	0	2	0	0	0	16	2
Real Madrid	2022–23	La Liga	3	0	2	0	0	0	1 (Note: Appearance in FIFA Club World Cup)	0	6	0
Real Madrid	2023–24	La Liga	0	0	0	0	0	0	0	0	0	0
Real Madrid	Total		34	2	8	1	6	0	1	0	49	3
Bayern Munich (loan)	2019–20	Bundesliga	3	0	1	0	1	0	—		5	0
Fiorentina (loan)	2021–22	Serie A	25	1	2	0	—		—		27	1
Real Sociedad	2023–24	La Liga	9	0	3	0	3	0	—		15	0
Real Sociedad	2024–25	La Liga	2	0	2	0	4	0	—		8	0
Real Sociedad	2025–26	La Liga	5	1	4	0	—		—		9	1
Real Sociedad	Total		16	1	9	0	7	0	—		32	1
Career total			214	7	21	1	20	1	1	0	256	9

=== International ===
As of match played 9 June 2018

Appearances and goals by national team and year
National team	Year	Apps	Goals
Spain	2017	2	0
Spain	2018	2	1
Total		4	1

As of 3 June 2018.
Spain score listed first, score column indicates score after each Odriozola goal.

International goals by date, venue, opponent, score, result and competition
No.	Date	Venue	Opponent	Score	Result	Competition
1	3 June 2018	Estadio de la Cerámica, Villarreal, Spain	Switzerland	1–0	1–1	Friendly

== Honours ==
Real Madrid

- La Liga: 2019–20
- Copa del Rey: 2022–23
- Supercopa de España: 2020
- UEFA Super Cup: 2022
- FIFA Club World Cup: 2018, 2022

Bayern Munich

- Bundesliga: 2019–20
- DFB-Pokal: 2019–20
- UEFA Champions League: 2019–20

Real Sociedad

- Copa del Rey: 2025–26

Spain U21

- UEFA European Under-21 Championship runner-up: 2017
