= 2020 DFL-Supercup =

German Supercup
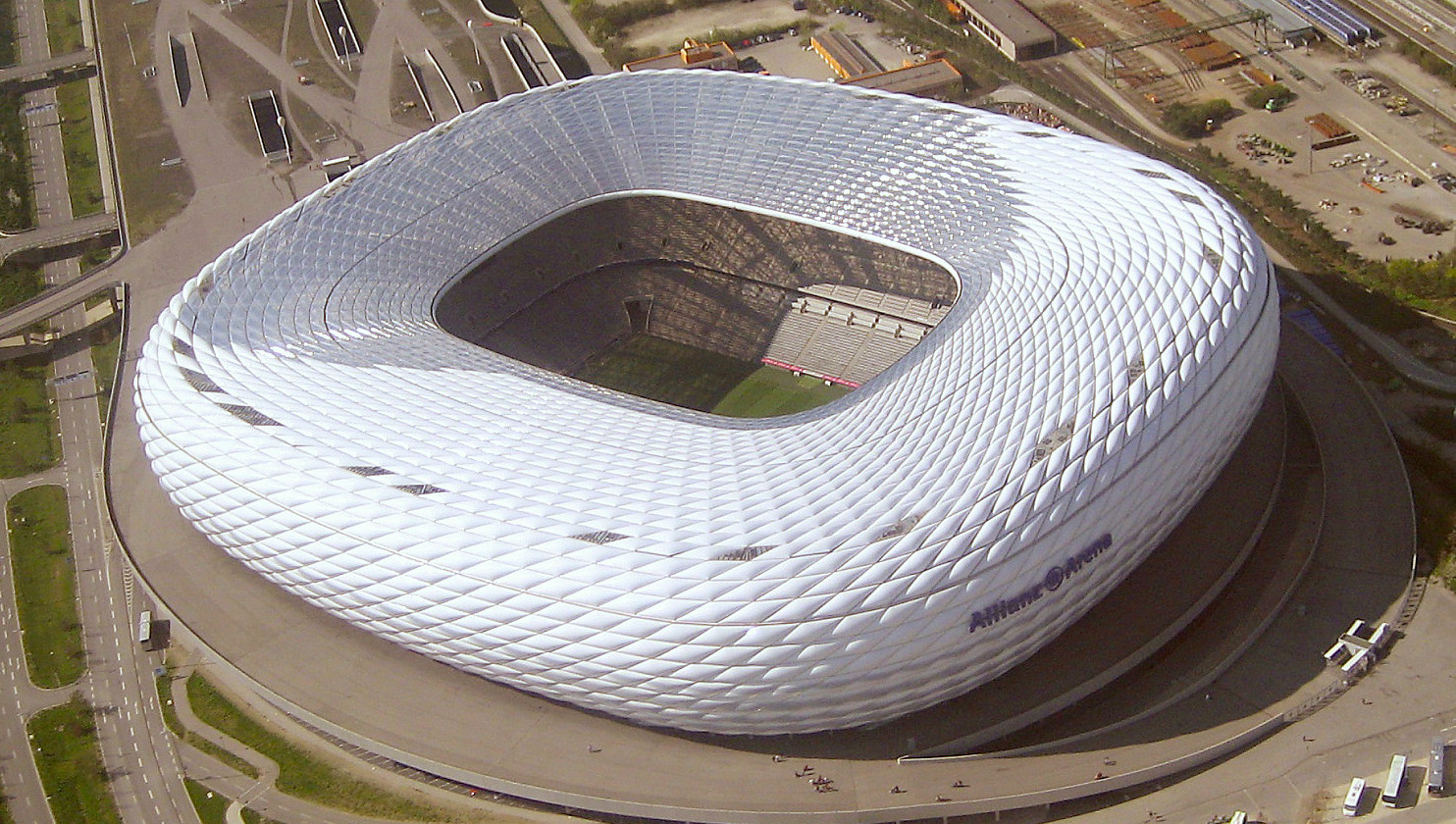
- The Allianz Arena in Munich hosted the match.
- Event: DFL-Supercup
Bayern Munich	Borussia Dortmund
3	2
- Date: 30 September 2020
- Venue: Allianz Arena, Munich
- Man of the Match: Joshua Kimmich (Bayern Munich)
- Referee: Bibiana Steinhaus (Langenhagen)
- Attendance: 0 (Note: The match was played behind closed doors due to the COVID-19 pandemic in Germany.)

The 2020 DFL-Supercup was the eleventh edition of the German super cup under the name DFL-Supercup, an annual football match contested by the winners of the previous season's Bundesliga and DFB-Pokal competitions. The match was played on 30 September 2020. The match is usually played in July or August prior to the start of the Bundesliga. However, due to postponement of the 2019–20 Bundesliga as a result of the COVID-19 pandemic, the start of the 2020–21 season was delayed until September 2020. Due to the COVID-19 pandemic, the match was played behind closed doors.

The match featured Bayern Munich, the champions of the 2019–20 Bundesliga and winners of the 2019–20 DFB-Pokal (completing a domestic double), and Borussia Dortmund, the runners-up of the Bundesliga and holders of the DFL-Supercup. The match was hosted by Bayern at the Allianz Arena in Munich. In a change of format, the Bundesliga champions hosted the DFL-Supercup, having previously been hosted by the winners of the DFB-Pokal, or the runners-up of the Bundesliga in the case of a team completing the double.

Bayern Munich won the match 3–2 for their eighth Supercup title. For the first time ever, a female referee was selected to officiate the match: German referee Bibiana Steinhaus, who directed the last match of her career.

== Teams ==
In the following table, matches until 1996 were in the DFB-Supercup era, since 2010 were in the DFL-Supercup era.

Team	Qualification	Previous appearances (bold indicates winners)
Bayern Munich	2019–20 Bundesliga champions and 2019–20 DFB-Pokal winners	13 (**1987**, 1989, **1990**, 1994, **2010**, **2012**, 2013, 2014, 2015, **2016**, **2017**, **2018**, 2019) (Note: Runners-up in the unofficial 2008 German Supercup. Six-time winners and one-time runners-up in the DFL-Ligapokal.)
Borussia Dortmund^{TH}	2019–20 Bundesliga runners-up	10 (**1989**, **1995**, **1996**, 2011, 2012, **2013**, **2014**, 2016, 2017, **2019**) (Note: Winners of the unofficial 2008 German Supercup. One-time runners-up in the DFL-Ligapokal.)

== Background ==
The match was the second German super cup to be held at the Allianz Arena (after 2012), and the third to take place in Munich (additionally in 1994 at the Olympiastadion).

== Match ==
=== Details ===
30 September 2020
20:30 CEST

Bayern Munich	3–2	Borussia Dortmund
Tolisso 18'; Müller 32'; Kimmich 82'	Report	Brandt 39'; Haaland 55'

Allianz Arena, Munich
Attendance: 0
Referee: Bibiana Steinhaus (Langenhagen)

**Bayern Munich**	**Borussia Dortmund**

GK	1	(Germany) Manuel Neuer (c)
RB	5	(France) Benjamin Pavard		(substituted off) 76'
CB	4	(Germany) Niklas Süle
CB	21	(France) Lucas Hernandez	(yellow card) 66'
LB	19	(Canada) Alphonso Davies
CM	6	(Germany) Joshua Kimmich
CM	8	(Spain) Javi Martínez		(substituted off) 84'
CM	24	(France) Corentin Tolisso
RW	25	(Germany) Thomas Müller
CF	9	(Poland) Robert Lewandowski		(substituted off) 83'
LW	29	(France) Kingsley Coman		(substituted off) 54'
Substitutes:
GK	35	(Germany) Alexander Nübel
DF	17	(Germany) Jérôme Boateng
DF	27	(Austria) David Alaba
DF	41	(United States) Chris Richards		(substituted on) 76'
MF	7	(Germany) Serge Gnabry		(substituted on) 54'
MF	30	(Germany) Adrian Fein
MF	40	(United States) Malik Tillman
MF	42	(Germany) Jamal Musiala		(substituted on) 84'
FW	14	(Netherlands) Joshua Zirkzee		(substituted on) 83'
Manager:
(Germany) Hansi Flick

GK	35	(Switzerland) Marwin Hitz
CB	23	(Germany) Emre Can
CB	15	(Germany) Mats Hummels	(substituted off) 76'
CB	16	(Switzerland) Manuel Akanji
RM	24	(Belgium) Thomas Meunier	(substituted off) 67'
CM	6	(Denmark) Thomas Delaney
CM	8	(Germany) Mahmoud Dahoud
LM	30	(Germany) Felix Passlack
RW	11	(Germany) Marco Reus (c)	(substituted off) 72'
CF	9	(Norway) Erling Haaland	(substituted off) 68'
LW	19	(Germany) Julian Brandt	(substituted off) 76'
Substitutes:
GK	40	(Germany) Stefan Drljača
DF	13	(Portugal) Raphaël Guerreiro
DF	14	(Germany) Nico Schulz	(substituted on) 67'
DF	26	(Poland) Łukasz Piszczek	(substituted on) 76'
MF	20	(Brazil) Reinier	(substituted on) 68'
MF	22	(England) Jude Bellingham	(substituted on) 76'
MF	27	(Germany) Marius Wolf
MF	28	(Belgium) Axel Witsel
MF	32	(United States) Giovanni Reyna	(substituted on) 72'
Manager:
(Switzerland) Lucien Favre

Man of the Match:
Joshua Kimmich (Bayern Munich)

Assistant referees:
Marcel Unger (Halle)
Thomas Stein (Weibersbrunn)
Fourth official:
Harm Osmers (Hanover)
Video assistant referee:
Sascha Stegemann (Niederkassel)
Assistant video assistant referee:
Frederick Assmuth (Cologne)

**Match rules**

- 90 minutes.
- Penalty shoot-out if scores level.
- Nine named substitutes, of which up to five may be used. (Note: Each team was given only three opportunities to make substitutions, excluding substitutions made at half-time.)

== See also ==
- 2020–21 Bundesliga
- 2020–21 DFB-Pokal
