= 2018 DFL-Supercup =

German Supercup
- Match programme cover
- Event: DFL-Supercup
Eintracht Frankfurt	Bayern Munich
0	5
- Date: 12 August 2018
- Venue: Commerzbank-Arena, Frankfurt
- Man of the Match: Robert Lewandowski (Bayern Munich)
- Referee: Marco Fritz (Korb)
- Attendance: 51,500
- Weather: Partly cloudy 24 °C (75 °F); 36% humidity

The 2018 DFL-Supercup was the ninth edition of the German super cup under the name DFL-Supercup, an annual football match contested by the winners of the previous season's Bundesliga and DFB-Pokal competitions. The match was played on 12 August 2018.

The DFL-Supercup featured Eintracht Frankfurt, the winners of the 2017–18 DFB-Pokal, and Bayern Munich, the winners of the 2017–18 Bundesliga and two-time defending champions of the DFL-Supercup.

Bayern Munich won the match 5–0 for their third consecutive and seventh overall title.

== Teams ==
In the following table, matches until 1996 were in the DFB-Supercup era, since 2010 were in the DFL-Supercup era.

Team	Qualification	Previous appearances (bold indicates winners)
Eintracht Frankfurt	2017–18 DFB-Pokal winners	1 (1988)
Bayern Munich^{TH}	2017–18 Bundesliga champions	11 (**1987**, 1989, **1990**, 1994, **2010**, **2012**, 2013, 2014, 2015, **2016**, **2017**) (Note: Runners-up in the unofficial 2008 German Supercup. Six-time winners and one-time runners-up in the DFL-Ligapokal.)

== Background ==
This was the first competitive match for incoming Bayern manager Niko Kovač, who left Eintracht Frankfurt the previous season after leading them to the DFB-Pokal title over future employers Bayern Munich.

== Match ==
=== Details ===
12 August 2018
20:30 CEST

Eintracht Frankfurt	0–5	Bayern Munich
	Report	Lewandowski 21', 26', 54'; Coman 63'; Thiago 85'

Commerzbank-Arena, Frankfurt
Attendance: 51,500
Referee: Marco Fritz (Korb)

**Eintracht Frankfurt**	**Bayern Munich**

GK	1	(Denmark) Frederik Rønnow
CB	19	(Argentina) David Abraham (c)	(yellow card) 70'
CB	20	(Japan) Makoto Hasebe
CB	13	(Mexico) Carlos Salcedo
RM	24	(Germany) Danny da Costa
CM	16	(Spain) Lucas Torró
CM	6	(Netherlands) Jonathan de Guzmán		(substituted off) 64'
LM	15	(Netherlands) Jetro Willems
RW	11	(Serbia) Mijat Gaćinović
LW	10	(Mexico) Marco Fabián		(substituted off) 64'
CF	9	(France) Sébastien Haller		(substituted off) 76'
Substitutes:
GK	29	(Germany) Felix Wiedwald
DF	23	(Germany) Marco Russ
DF	33	(Israel) Taleb Tawatha
MF	5	(Switzerland) Gelson Fernandes
MF	7	(Germany) Danny Blum		(substituted on) 64'
FW	4	(Croatia) Ante Rebić		(substituted on) 64'
FW	8	(Serbia) Luka Jović		(substituted on) 76'
Manager:
(Austria) Adi Hütter

GK	1	(Germany) Manuel Neuer (c)
RB	32	(Germany) Joshua Kimmich
CB	4	(Germany) Niklas Süle
CB	5	(Germany) Mats Hummels	(yellow card) 45+1'
LB	27	(Austria) David Alaba
DM	8	(Spain) Javi Martínez
CM	25	(Germany) Thomas Müller		(substituted off) 64'
CM	6	(Spain) Thiago
RW	10	(Netherlands) Arjen Robben		(substituted off) 58'
LW	7	(France) Franck Ribéry
CF	9	(Poland) Robert Lewandowski		(substituted off) 72'
Substitutes:
GK	26	(Germany) Sven Ulreich
DF	13	(Brazil) Rafinha
DF	14	(Spain) Juan Bernat
MF	18	(Germany) Leon Goretzka		(substituted on) 64'
MF	19	(Germany) Sebastian Rudy
MF	29	(France) Kingsley Coman		(substituted on) 58'
FW	2	(Germany) Sandro Wagner		(substituted on) 72'
Manager:
(Croatia) Niko Kovač

Man of the Match:
Robert Lewandowski (Bayern Munich)

Assistant referees:
Dominik Schaal (Tübingen)
Marcel Pelgrim (Hamminkeln-Loikum)
Fourth official:
Martin Petersen (Stuttgart)
Video assistant referee:
Bastian Dankert (Rostock)
Assistant video assistant referee:
René Rohde (Rostock)

**Match rules**

- 90 minutes.
- Penalty shoot-out if scores level.
- Seven named substitutes, of which up to three may be used.

=== Statistics ===
Statistic	Eintracht Frankfurt	Bayern Munich
Goals scored	0	5
Total shots	8	13
Shots on target	1	7
Saves	2	1
Ball possession	32%	68%
Corner kicks	3	5
Fouls committed	8	9
Offsides	0	2
Yellow cards	1	1
Red cards	0	0

== See also ==
- 2018–19 Bundesliga
- 2018–19 DFB-Pokal
