= Der Klassiker =

Name for any match between Borussia Dortmund and Bayern Munich

Bayern; Munich	Borussia Dortmund
- Other names: German Clásico
- Location: Germany (Bavaria, Westphalia)
- Teams: Bayern Munich; Borussia Dortmund
- First meeting: 16 October 1965; Bundesliga; Bayern 0–2 Dortmund
- Latest meeting: 31 October 2026; Bundesliga; Bayern 2–2 Dortmund
- Next meeting: 6 March 2027; Bundesliga; Dortmund v Bayern
- Stadiums: Allianz Arena (Munich); Westfalenstadion (Dortmund)

Statistics
- Total meetings: 141
- Most wins: Bayern (70)
- Most player appearances: Thomas Müller (44)
- Top scorer: Robert Lewandowski (32)
- All-time series: Bayern: 70; Drawn: 38; Dortmund: 33
- Largest victory: Bayern 11–1 Dortmund; Bundesliga (27 November 1971)

Locations of the two teams in Germany

Der Klassiker in German (The Classic), also known as the "German Clásico", is the name given to any football match between Bayern Munich and Borussia Dortmund. They are two of the most successful teams in German football, having won a combined total of 28 of the past 33 Bundesliga titles as of the 2025–26 season. The two teams fought closely for the Bundesliga title in the early 2010s, and met in the 2013 UEFA Champions League final.

However, the nature of the rivalry has been called into question, with many disputing the fixture being a "classic" due to there being little historic rivalry between the teams, in contrast to the long history of many other prominent football derbies in Germany, including Dortmund's Revierderby with FC Schalke 04, the various Bavarian football derbies involving Bayern Munich and 1. FC Nürnberg, and the elder 70s rivalry between Bayern Munich and Borussia Mönchengladbach.

== History ==
=== First meeting and mutual successes ===
The first match between the two clubs was a 2–0 win for Dortmund in Munich on 16 October 1965.

On 5 May 1966, Dortmund won the 1966 European Cup Winners' Cup final against Liverpool in extra time, becoming the first German club to win a European title. Bayern Munich won the same competition the following season.

In 1971, Bayern defeated Dortmund 11–1; this remain's Bayern's biggest Bundesliga victory and Dortmund's second worst defeat, after Dortmund's worst defeat of 12–0 v Borussia Mönchengladbach on 29 April 1978.

On the other hand, the highest scoring draw in a Bundesliga match between the two teams occurred on 21 May 1983, when Karl-Heinz Rummenigge scored a late equaliser to save Bayern from a defeat against hosts Dortmund, with a final scoreline of 4–4.

=== The feud begins ===
The rivalry between the clubs grew during the 1990s, as Dortmund's stature increased to challenge perennial title favourites Bayern, winning two Bundesliga titles in 1994–95 and 1995–96.

In 1996, Bayern captain Lothar Matthäus accused Germany teammate Andreas Möller of being a 'crybaby', wiping imaginary tears from his face; Möller reacted by slapping Matthäus. At the end of that season, Dortmund won the 1997 UEFA Champions League final which happened to be played at the Olympiastadion, Bayern's home ground.

The teams met in the quarter-finals of the next edition of the Champions League, and Dortmund prevailed over two legs thanks to a single goal from Stéphane Chapuisat. That summer, Bayern hired Dortmund's successful coach Ottmar Hitzfeld to work for them. Tempers flared twice during Bayern and Dortmund's second meeting in the 1998–99 Bundesliga, as Bayern goalkeeper Oliver Kahn first attempted a flying kung-fu kick at Chapuisat, and later appeared to bite Heiko Herrlich's ear.

In the early 2000s both clubs remained successful, as Bayern lost one Champions League final (1999) then won another (2001) in addition to more domestic success, while Dortmund won the 2001–02 Bundesliga and reached the UEFA Cup final the same year. An angry 2001 league meeting between the pair was notable for ten yellow cards and three red being shown (a Bundesliga record for indiscipline). However, Dortmund soon fell heavily into debt, and a €2m loan from Bayern in 2004 played a small role in saving them from bankruptcy.

On 19 April 2008, the two sides clashed in the 2008 DFB-Pokal final for the first time that took place in Berlin. Luca Toni opened the scoring after eleven minutes, but Mladen Petric drew Dortmund level in stoppage time, forcing thirty additional minutes. The Italian completed his double in extra time, thus lifting Bayern to cup glory.

=== Dortmund revival ===
By 2010, Dortmund had put together a strong squad, including Mats Hummels, Mario Götze, Shinji Kagawa and Robert Lewandowski, who led the club to the 2011 and 2012 Bundesliga titles; it was the first time any club other than Bayern won back-to-back championships since Dortmund in the mid-1990s. Dortmund clinched the 2011–12 league championship in a home match where bananas were tossed at Bayern goalkeeper Manuel Neuer. Dortmund then claimed the first double of their history by beating Bayern 5–2 in the 2012 DFB-Pokal final with a Lewandowski hat-trick, which was also their fifth consecutive win over the opponents.

=== Champions League final at Wembley ===
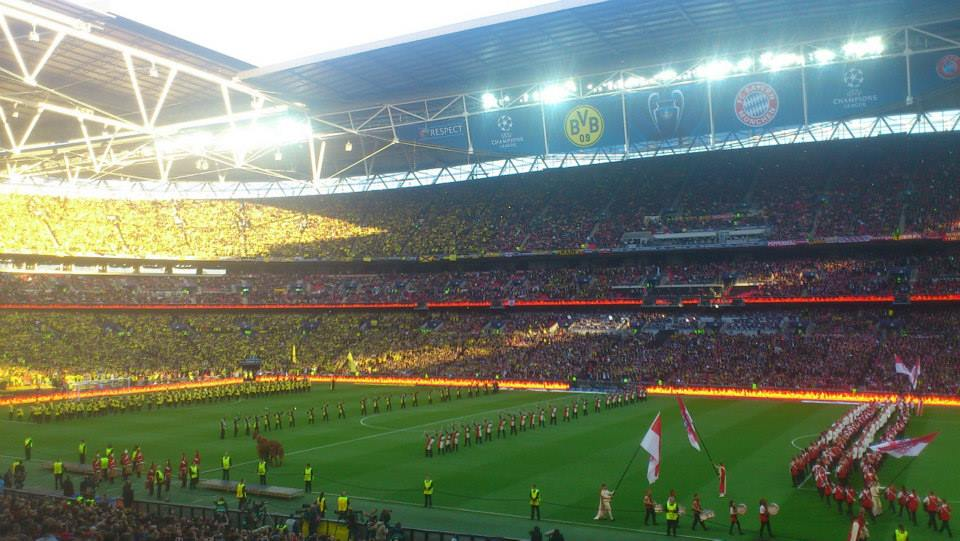
Opening ceremony of the 2013 UEFA Champions League final between Borussia Dortmund and Bayern Munich at Wembley Stadium

After seeing two league championships heading to Dortmund and losing the 2012 UEFA Champions League final to Chelsea at their own Allianz Arena, Bayern recovered to clinch the 2012–13 Bundesliga in record time, breaking Dortmund's points record which had been set the year before. At the end of that season, the rivals met in the 2013 UEFA Champions League final. The German clubs had eliminated the two Spanish contenders, Real Madrid and Barcelona, leading to the term "German Clasico" term first being used at that time, based on the El Clásico between those two Spanish clubs. The game was also notable for the fact that Dortmund's Mario Götze had already agreed to join Bayern in the coming weeks, although he did not play in the final due to injury.

In the final, Arjen Robben scored a dramatic 89th-minute winner at Wembley Stadium. Bayern would wrap up the first Treble in their history a week later in the 2013 DFB-Pokal final.

=== Domestic finals and player moves ===
Following the biggest match involving the teams, several domestic finals were played between them in quick succession. In the 2014 DFB-Pokal final on 17 May 2014, Bayern managed to score two goals in extra time, thus achieving their 17th win in the competition. After that, both clubs met again in the 2014 DFL-Supercup at Dortmund's Signal Iduna Park, featuring Robert Lewandowski who had just moved to Bayern as a free agent after his contract with Dortmund ended. The match ended 2–0 to Dortmund.

Two years later, the 2016 DFB-Pokal final was the last match in Dortmund shirt for their captain Mats Hummels before he also moved to Bayern, where his career had begun; Bayern won the trophy on penalties after a 0–0 draw. They clashed again in the 2016 DFL-Supercup after Bayern secured a double, Dortmund being runners-up in the league as well as beaten cup finalists; the Bavarians won that match 2–0. The 2017 DFL-Supercup featured the same teams (champions Bayern and cup holders Dortmund) and the same outcome, this time Bayern winning on penalties after a 2–2 draw. In March 2018, Bayern secured a 6–0 home win over Dortmund in the league, the largest margin of victory for either side since the 11–1 result 47 years earlier. The most important recent result has seen Bayern Munich defeat Borussia Dortmund 2–1 in the 2026 Franz Beckenbauer Supercup.

== Results history ==
As of 31 October 2026

Bayern win
Dortmund win
Draw

=== Bundesliga ===
Season	Date	Home	Away	Result
2026–27	6 Mar 2027	Dortmund	Bayern	
2026–27	31 Oct 2026	Bayern	Dortmund	2–2
2025–26	28 Feb 2026	Dortmund	Bayern	2–3
2025–26	18 Oct 2025	Bayern	Dortmund	2–1
2024–25	12 Apr 2025	Dortmund	Bayern	2–2
2024–25	30 Nov 2024	Bayern	Dortmund	1–1
2023–24	30 Mar 2024	Bayern	Dortmund	0–2
2023–24	4 Nov 2023	Dortmund	Bayern	0–4
2022–23	1 Apr 2023	Dortmund	Bayern	2–4
2022–23	8 Oct 2022	Bayern	Dortmund	2–2
2021–22	23 Apr 2022	Dortmund	Bayern	1–3
2021–22	4 Dec 2021	Bayern	Dortmund	3–2
2020–21	6 Mar 2021	Dortmund	Bayern	2–4
2020–21	7 Nov 2020	Bayern	Dortmund	3–2
2019–20	26 May 2020	Dortmund	Bayern	0–1
2019–20	9 Nov 2019	Bayern	Dortmund	4–0
2018–19	6 Apr 2019	Bayern	Dortmund	5–0
2018–19	10 Nov 2018	Dortmund	Bayern	3–2
2017–18	31 Mar 2018	Dortmund	Bayern	1–2
2017–18	4 Nov 2017	Bayern	Dortmund	3–1
2016–17	8 Apr 2017	Dortmund	Bayern	1–3
2016–17	19 Nov 2016	Bayern	Dortmund	0–1
2015–16	5 Mar 2016	Dortmund	Bayern	0–0
2015–16	4 Oct 2015	Bayern	Dortmund	5–1
2014–15	4 Apr 2015	Dortmund	Bayern	0–1
2014–15	1 Nov 2014	Bayern	Dortmund	2–1
2013–14	12 Apr 2014	Dortmund	Bayern	3–0
2013–14	23 Nov 2013	Bayern	Dortmund	3–0
2012–13	4 May 2013	Dortmund	Bayern	1–1
2012–13	1 Dec 2012	Bayern	Dortmund	1–1
2011–12	11 Apr 2012	Dortmund	Bayern	1–0
2011–12	19 Nov 2011	Bayern	Dortmund	0–1
2010–11	26 Feb 2011	Dortmund	Bayern	3–1
2010–11	3 Oct 2010	Bayern	Dortmund	0–2
2009–10	13 Feb 2010	Dortmund	Bayern	1–3
2009–10	12 Sep 2009	Bayern	Dortmund	5–1
2008–09	08 Feb 2009	Dortmund	Bayern	1–3
2008–09	23 Aug 2008	Bayern	Dortmund	1–1
2007–08	13 Apr 2008	Bayern	Dortmund	5–0
2007–08	28 Oct 2007	Dortmund	Bayern	0–0
2006–07	26 Jan 2007	Dortmund	Bayern	3–2
2006–07	11 Aug 2006	Bayern	Dortmund	2–0
2005–06	13 May 2006	Bayern	Dortmund	3–3
2005–06	17 Dec 2005	Dortmund	Bayern	1–2
2004–05	19 Feb 2005	Bayern	Dortmund	5–0
2004–05	18 Sep 2004	Dortmund	Bayern	2–2
2003–04	17 Apr 2004	Dortmund	Bayern	2–0
2003–04	9 Nov 2003	Bayern	Dortmund	4–1
2002–03	19 Apr 2003	Dortmund	Bayern	1–0
2002–03	9 Nov 2002	Bayern	Dortmund	2–1
2001–02	9 Feb 2002	Bayern	Dortmund	1–1
2001–02	8 Sep 2001	Dortmund	Bayern	0–2
2000–01	7 Apr 2001	Dortmund	Bayern	1–1
2000–01	4 Nov 2000	Bayern	Dortmund	6–2
1999–2000	23 Apr 2000	Dortmund	Bayern	0–1
1999–2000	4 Dec 1999	Bayern	Dortmund	1–1
1998–99	3 Apr 1999	Dortmund	Bayern	2–2
1998–99	4 Oct 1998	Bayern	Dortmund	2–2
1997–98	9 May 1998	Bayern	Dortmund	4–0
1997–98	11 Nov 1997	Dortmund	Bayern	0–2
1996–97	19 Apr 1997	Dortmund	Bayern	1–1
1996–97	20 Oct 1996	Bayern	Dortmund	0–0
1995–96	30 Mar 1996	Bayern	Dortmund	1–0
1995–96	1 Oct 1995	Dortmund	Bayern	3–1
1994–95	22 Apr 1995	Bayern	Dortmund	2–1
1994–95	22 Oct 1994	Dortmund	Bayern	1–0
1993–94	20 Mar 1994	Bayern	Dortmund	0–0
1993–94	25 Sep 1993	Dortmund	Bayern	1–1
1992–93	10 Apr 1993	Bayern	Dortmund	2–0
1992–93	25 Sep 1992	Dortmund	Bayern	1–2
1991–92	10 Apr 1992	Dortmund	Bayern	3–0
1991–92	12 Oct 1991	Bayern	Dortmund	0–3
1990–91	17 May 1991	Dortmund	Bayern	2–3
1990–91	10 Nov 1990	Bayern	Dortmund	2–3
1989–90	12 May 1990	Bayern	Dortmund	3–0
1989–90	18 Nov 1989	Dortmund	Bayern	2–2
1988–89	15 Apr 1989	Dortmund	Bayern	1–1
1988–89	12 Oct 1988	Bayern	Dortmund	1–1
1987–88	28 Nov 1987	Bayern	Dortmund	1–3
1987–88	1 Aug 1987	Dortmund	Bayern	1–3
1986–87	21 Feb 1987	Dortmund	Bayern	2–2
1986–87	9 Aug 1986	Bayern	Dortmund	2–2
1985–86	12 Apr 1986	Dortmund	Bayern	0–3
1985–86	9 Nov 1985	Bayern	Dortmund	0–1
1984–85	2 Mar 1985	Dortmund	Bayern	1–1
1984–85	15 Sep 1984	Bayern	Dortmund	1–0
1983–84	19 May 1984	Dortmund	Bayern	1–1
1983–84	3 Dec 1983	Bayern	Dortmund	1–0
1982–83	21 May 1983	Dortmund	Bayern	4–4
1982–83	27 Nov 1982	Bayern	Dortmund	3–0
1981–82	13 Mar 1982	Bayern	Dortmund	3–1
1981–82	26 Sep 1981	Dortmund	Bayern	2–0
1980–81	24 Jan 1981	Dortmund	Bayern	2–2
1980–81	19 Aug 1980	Bayern	Dortmund	5–3
1979–80	3 May 1980	Dortmund	Bayern	1–0
1979–80	24 Nov 1979	Bayern	Dortmund	4–2
1978–79	10 Feb 1979	Bayern	Dortmund	4–0
1978–79	12 Aug 1978	Dortmund	Bayern	1–0
1977–78	4 Mar 1978	Dortmund	Bayern	1–1
1977–78	12 Oct 1977	Bayern	Dortmund	3–0
1976–77	12 Mar 1977	Bayern	Dortmund	1–2
1976–77	2 Oct 1976	Dortmund	Bayern	3–3
1971–72	24 Jun 1972	Dortmund	Bayern	0–1
1971–72	27 Nov 1971	Bayern	Dortmund	11–1
1970–71	4 May 1971	Bayern	Dortmund	1–1
1970–71	28 Aug 1970	Dortmund	Bayern	0–0
1969–70	7 Feb 1970	Dortmund	Bayern	1–3
1969–70	12 Sep 1969	Bayern	Dortmund	3–0
1968–69	19 Apr 1969	Dortmund	Bayern	0–1
1968–69	30 Oct 1968	Bayern	Dortmund	4–1
1967–68	2 Apr 1968	Bayern	Dortmund	2–0
1967–68	9 Sep 1967	Dortmund	Bayern	6–3
1966–67	3 Jun 1967	Dortmund	Bayern	4–0
1966–67	17 Dec 1966	Bayern	Dortmund	1–0
1965–66	12 Mar 1966	Dortmund	Bayern	3–0
1965–66	16 Oct 1965	Bayern	Dortmund	0–2

=== DFB-Pokal ===
Season	Date	Home	Away	Result
2017–18	20 Dec 2017	Dortmund	Bayern	1–2
2016–17	26 Apr 2017	Dortmund	Bayern	3–2
2015–16	21 May 2016	Bayern	Dortmund	0–0 (4–3 pen.)
2014–15	28 Apr 2015	Dortmund	Bayern	1–1 (2–0 pen.)
2013–14	17 May 2014	Dortmund	Bayern	0–2
2012–13	27 Feb 2013	Dortmund	Bayern	0–1
2011–12	12 May 2012	Dortmund	Bayern	5–2
2007–08	19 Apr 2008	Dortmund	Bayern	1–2
1992–93	12 Sep 1992	Dortmund	Bayern	2–2 (5–4 pen.)
1981–82	5 Dec 1982	Bayern	Dortmund	4–0
1965–66	2 Feb 1966	Bayern	Dortmund	2–0

=== DFB-Ligapokal ===
Season	Date	Home	Away	Result
1999	14 Jul 1999	Dortmund	Bayern	0–1
1997	23 Jul 1997	Dortmund	Bayern	0–2

=== DFB/DFL/Franz Beckenbauer Supercup ===
Season	Date	Home	Away	Result
2026	22 Aug 2026	Dortmund	Bayern	1–2
2021	17 Aug 2021	Dortmund	Bayern	1–3
2020	30 Sep 2020	Bayern	Dortmund	3–2
2019	3 Aug 2019	Dortmund	Bayern	2–0
2017	5 Aug 2017	Dortmund	Bayern	2–2 (4–5 pen.)
2016	14 Aug 2016	Dortmund	Bayern	0–2
2014	13 Aug 2014	Dortmund	Bayern	2–0
2013	27 Jul 2013	Dortmund	Bayern	4–2
2012	12 Aug 2012	Bayern	Dortmund	2–1
1989	25 Jul 1989	Dortmund	Bayern	4–3

=== UEFA Champions League ===
Season	Date	Home	Away	Result
2012–13	25 May 2013	Dortmund	Bayern	1–2
1997–98	18 Mar 1998	Dortmund	Bayern	1–0
1997–98	4 Mar 1998	Bayern	Dortmund	0–0

== Statistics ==
=== Overall match statistics ===
As of 31 October 2026

Competition	Played	Bayern wins	Draws	Dortmund wins	Bayern goals	Dortmund goals
Bundesliga	115	56	33	26	233	143
DFB-Pokal	11	6	3	2	20	13
DFB-Ligapokal	2	2	0	0	3	0
DFB/DFL/Franz Beckenbauer Supercup	10	5	1	4	19	19
UEFA Champions League	3	1	1	1	2	2
Totals	141	70	38	33	277	177

=== Biggest wins ===
- Bayern Munich: 11–1, 27 November 1971
- Borussia Dortmund: 4–0, 6 March 1967

=== Head-to-head ranking in Bundesliga (1964–2026) ===
P.	64	65	66	67	68	69	70	71	72	73	74	75	76	77	78	79	80	81	82	83	84	85	86	87	88	89	90	91	92	93	94	95	96	97	98	99	00	01	02	03	04	05	06	07	08	09	10	11	12	13	14	15	16	17	18	19	20	21	22	23	24	25	26
1						1			1	1	1						1	1				1	1	1		1	1				1	1	1	1		1	1	1	1	1		1	1		1		1	1	1	1	1	1	1	1	1	1	1	1	1	1		1	1
2			2				2	2																	2			2	2	2			2		2						2					2			2	2	2		2			2	2		2	2			2
3		3	3	3									3						3															3				3	3	3								3						3				3			3		
4	4															4				4	4			4			4			4	4					4								4											4							4	
5					5		5																																								5														5		
6				6													6		6													6									6					6																	
7														7				7		7						7																7	7									7											
8														8																																																	
9																																												9																			
10												10																10	10						10																												
11															11																						11																										
12															12	12																																															
13								13													13				13																				13																		
14					14																	14																																									
15																																																															
16						16																	16																																								
17									17																																																						
18																																																															

• Total: Bayern Munich with 48 higher finishes, Borussia Dortmund with 9 (as of the end of the 2025–26 season).

== Honours ==
As of 22 August 2026

- Club holds record in the competition

Team	Bundesliga	DFB-Pokal	DFB-Ligapokal	DFB/DFL/Franz Beckenbauer Supercup	European Cup/ UEFA Champions League	UEFA Cup/ Europa League	Cup Winners' Cup	UEFA Super Cup	Intercontinental Cup	Club World Cup	Club total
Bayern Munich	35	21	6	12	6	1	1	2	2	2	88
Borussia Dortmund	8	5	0	6	1	0	1	0	1	0	22
Total	43	26	6	18	7	1	2	2	3	2	110

== Players and managers who have played for or managed both clubs ==
Below are the players and managers who played for or managed both clubs.

=== Bayern Munich then Borussia Dortmund ===
Name	Position	Bayern Munich	Borussia Dortmund
Name	Position	Career	Career
(Germany) Helmut Schmidt	MF	1967–1970	1972–1974
(Germany) Helmut Nerlinger	DF/FW	1969–1970	1972–1978
(Germany) Burkhard Segler	MF/FW	1973	1973–1979
(Germany) Michael Rummenigge	MF	1981–1988	1988–1993
(Germany) Stefan Reuter	DF/MF	1988–1991, 2004–2005	1992–2004
(Germany) Jürgen Kohler	DF	1989–1991	1995–2002
(Germany) Toni Schumacher	GK	1991–1992	1995–1996
(Germany) Christian Nerlinger	MF	1993–1998	1998–2001
(Germany) Markus Feulner	MF	2001–2003	2009–2011
(Croatia) Robert Kovač	DF	2001–2005	2007–2009
(Germany) Mats Hummels	DF	2006–2009, 2016–2019	2008–2016, 2019–2024
(Germany) Emre Can	DF/MF	2012–2013	2020–
(Germany) Sebastian Rode	MF	2014–2016	2016–2018
(Germany) Niklas Süle	DF	2017–2022	2022–2026
(Austria) Marcel Sabitzer	MF/FW	2021–2023	2023–

=== Borussia Dortmund then Bayern Munich ===
Name	Position	Borussia Dortmund	Bayern Munich
Name	Position	Career	Career
(Germany) Jürgen Wegmann	FW	1984–1986, 1989–1992	1987–1989
(Germany) Thomas Helmer	DF	1986–1992	1992–1999
(Germany) Torsten Frings	MF	2002–2004	2004–2005
(Germany) Mario Götze	MF/FW	2009–2013, 2016–2020	2013–2016
(Poland) Robert Lewandowski	FW	2010–2014	2014–2022
(Croatia) Ivan Perišić	MF/FW	2011–2013	2019–2020
(Portugal) Raphaël Guerreiro	MF/FW	2016–2023	2023–2026

=== Managers and officials for both clubs ===
Name	Bayern Munich	Borussia Dortmund
Name	Career	Career
(Socialist Federal Republic of Yugoslavia) Branko Zebec	1968–1970	1981–1982
(Germany) Udo Lattek	1970–1975	1979–1981, 2000
(Germany) Otto Rehhagel	1995–1996	1976–1978
(Hungary) Pál Csernai	1978–1983	1985–1986
(Germany) Reinhard Saftig	1979–1984	1984–1988
(Germany) Erich Ribbeck	1992–1993	1984–1985
(Germany) Ottmar Hitzfeld	1998–2004, 2007–2008	1991–1997
(Germany) Matthias Sammer	2012–2016 (sporting director)	1993–1998 (player), 2000–2004, 2018– (advisor)
(Germany) Toni Schumacher	1993–1994 (official), also player	1995–1998 (official), also player
(Croatia) Niko Kovač	2001–2003 (player), 2018–2019 (manager)	2025– (manager)
(Croatia) Robert Kovač	2018–2019 (assistant coach), also player	2025– (assistant coach), also player
(Germany) Thomas Tuchel	2023–2024	2015–2017

== See also ==
- Major football rivalries
- Sports rivalry
