= 2017 DFL-Supercup =

German Supercup
- Match programme cover
- Event: DFL-Supercup
Borussia Dortmund	Bayern Munich
2	2
- Bayern Munich won 5–4 on penalties
- Date: 5 August 2017
- Venue: Signal Iduna Park, Dortmund
- Man of the Match: Joshua Kimmich (Bayern Munich)
- Referee: Felix Zwayer (Berlin)
- Attendance: 81,360
- Weather: Partly cloudy 16 °C (61 °F); 82% humidity

The 2017 DFL-Supercup was the eighth edition of the German super cup under the name DFL-Supercup, an annual football match contested by the winners of the previous season's Bundesliga and DFB-Pokal competitions. The match was played on 5 August 2017.

The DFL-Supercup featured Borussia Dortmund, the winners of the 2016–17 DFB-Pokal, and Bayern Munich, the winners of the 2016–17 Bundesliga and holders of the competition.

Bayern Munich won the DFL-Supercup 5–4 on penalties following a 2–2 draw after 90 minutes for their sixth title.

== Teams ==
In the following table, matches until 1996 were in the DFB-Supercup era, since 2010 were in the DFL-Supercup era.

Team	Qualification	Previous appearances (bold indicates winners)
Borussia Dortmund	2016–17 DFB-Pokal winners	8 (**1989**, **1995**, **1996**, 2011, 2012, **2013**, **2014**, 2016) (Note: Winners of the unofficial 2008 German Supercup. One-time runners-up in the DFL-Ligapokal.)
Bayern Munich^{TH}	2016–17 Bundesliga champions	10 (**1987**, 1989, **1990**, 1994, **2010**, **2012**, 2013, 2014, 2015, **2016**) (Note: Runners-up in the unofficial 2008 German Supercup. Six-time winners and one-time runners-up in the DFL-Ligapokal.)

== Background ==
Bayern Munich were the reigning champions, having beaten Borussia Dortmund 2–0 in the 2016 edition.

Both teams have won the competition five times, a joint record. The match was Dortmund's second consecutive and ninth overall appearance, with a record of five wins and three losses prior. The match was Bayern's record sixth consecutive and record eleventh overall appearance, with a record of five wins and five losses prior. This was the record sixth super cup between Dortmund and Bayern, having previously met in 1989, 2012, 2013, 2014, and 2016. Of these, Dortmund have won three (in 1989, 2013, and 2014), while Bayern have won twice (in 2012 and 2016).

This was the first competitive match for Peter Bosz as head coach of Borussia Dortmund, moving from Ajax in the summer to replace Thomas Tuchel.

== Match ==
=== Summary ===
Christian Pulisic opened the scoring for Borussia Dortmund in the 12th minute when he ran in on goal and shot low with his right foot past the advancing Sven Ulreich. Robert Lewandowski made it 1–1 in the 18th minute when he finished with his right foot from close range after a low cross from the right by Joshua Kimmich. Pierre-Emerick Aubameyang made it 2–1 in the 71st minute when he clipped the ball over the advancing Sven Ulreich from the right of the penalty area with his right foot.

With two minutes to go the ball deflected into the net off Roman Bürki from close range after an initial shot from Joshua Kimmich hit Marc Bartra and came back to hit Bürki before going into the net. In the penalty shoot-out, Joshua Kimmich missed for Bayern Munich and Sebastian Rode missed for Borussia Dortmund. Marc Bartra the took the sixth penalty for Borussia Dortmund where his shot was saved to his right by Sven Ulreich which allowed Bayern Munich to win 5–4 on penalties for their sixth Supercup.

=== Details ===
5 August 2017
20:30 CEST

Borussia Dortmund	2–2	Bayern Munich
Pulisic 12'; Aubameyang 71'	Report	Lewandowski 18'; Bürki 88' (o.g.)
Penalties
Dembélé (penalty scored); Philipp (penalty scored); Aubameyang (penalty scored); Rode (penalty missed); Castro (penalty scored); Bartra (penalty missed)	4–5	(penalty scored) Lewandowski; (penalty scored) Ribéry; (penalty missed) Kimmich; (penalty scored) Rudy; (penalty scored) Vidal; (penalty scored) Süle

Signal Iduna Park, Dortmund
Attendance: 81,360
Referee: Felix Zwayer (Berlin)

**Borussia Dortmund**	**Bayern Munich**

GK	38	(Switzerland) Roman Bürki
RB	26	(Poland) Łukasz Piszczek
CB	25	(Greece) Sokratis Papastathopoulos (c)	(yellow card) 17'
CB	5	(Spain) Marc Bartra
LB	2	(France) Dan-Axel Zagadou	(yellow card) 53'	(substituted off) 77'
DM	8	(Turkey) Nuri Şahin
CM	27	(Germany) Gonzalo Castro
CM	19	(Germany) Mahmoud Dahoud		(substituted off) 46'
RW	7	(France) Ousmane Dembélé
CF	17	(Gabon) Pierre-Emerick Aubameyang
LW	22	(United States) Christian Pulisic		(substituted off) 90'
Substitutes:
GK	1	(Germany) Roman Weidenfeller
DF	4	(Serbia) Neven Subotić
DF	36	(Turkey) Ömer Toprak
MF	18	(Germany) Sebastian Rode	(yellow card) 86'	(substituted on) 46'
MF	30	(Germany) Felix Passlack	(yellow card) 90+3'	(substituted on) 77'
FW	14	(Sweden) Alexander Isak
FW	20	(Germany) Maximilian Philipp		(substituted on) 90'
Manager:
(Netherlands) Peter Bosz

GK	26	(Germany) Sven Ulreich
RB	32	(Germany) Joshua Kimmich
CB	8	(Spain) Javi Martínez		(substituted off) 60'
CB	5	(Germany) Mats Hummels
LB	13	(Brazil) Rafinha
DM	19	(Germany) Sebastian Rudy
CM	24	(France) Corentin Tolisso		(substituted off) 84'
CM	23	(Chile) Arturo Vidal	(yellow card) 74'
RW	25	(Germany) Thomas Müller (c)		(substituted off) 67'
CF	9	(Poland) Robert Lewandowski	(yellow card) 69'
LW	7	(France) Franck Ribéry
Substitutes:
GK	36	(Germany) Christian Früchtl
DF	4	(Germany) Niklas Süle		(substituted on) 60'
DF	34	(Austria) Marco Friedl
MF	29	(France) Kingsley Coman		(substituted on) 67'
MF	33	(Germany) Timothy Tillman
MF	35	(Portugal) Renato Sanches		(substituted on) 84'
FW	41	(Serbia) Miloš Pantović
Manager:
(Italy) Carlo Ancelotti

Man of the Match:
Joshua Kimmich (Bayern Munich)

Assistant referees:
Thorsten Schiffner (Konstanz)
Christian Gittelmann (Gauersheim)
Fourth official:
Sascha Stegemann (Niederkassel)
Video assistant referee:
Tobias Stieler (Hamburg)

**Match rules**

- 90 minutes.
- Penalty shoot-out if scores level.
- Seven named substitutes, of which up to three may be used.

=== Statistics ===
Statistic	Borussia Dortmund	Bayern Munich
Goals scored	2	2
Total shots	9	16
Shots on target	4	5
Saves	4	2
Ball possession	48%	52%
Corner kicks	3	4
Fouls committed	16	14
Offsides	3	8
Yellow cards	4	2
Red cards	0	0

== See also ==
- 2017–18 Bundesliga
- 2017–18 DFB-Pokal
