= 2015 DFL-Supercup =

- Match programme cover
- Event: DFL-Supercup
VfL Wolfsburg	Bayern Munich
1	1
- VfL Wolfsburg won 5–4 on penalties
- Date: 1 August 2015
- Venue: Volkswagen Arena, Wolfsburg
- Man of the Match: Nicklas Bendtner (VfL Wolfsburg)
- Referee: Marco Fritz (Korb)
- Attendance: 30,000

The 2015 DFL-Supercup was the sixth edition of the German Super Cup under the name DFL-Supercup, an annual football match contested by the winners of the previous season's Bundesliga and DFB-Pokal competitions. It featured Bayern Munich, the winners of the 2014–15 Bundesliga, and VfL Wolfsburg, the winners of the 2014–15 DFB-Pokal.

Bayern lost 2–0 in the previous edition, to Borussia Dortmund.

The match was played on 1 August 2015. Wolfsburg defeated Bayern Munich 5–4 on penalties after the match had ended 1–1.

== Teams ==
In the following table, matches until 1996 in the DFB-Supercup era, matches since 2010 in the DFL-Supercup era.

Team	Qualification	Previous appearances (bold indicates winners)
VfL Wolfsburg	2014–15 DFB-Pokal winners	None (Note: Runners-up in the unofficial 2009 German Supercup.)
Bayern Munich	2014–15 Bundesliga champions	8 (**1987**, 1989, **1990**, 1994, **2010**, **2012**, 2013, 2014) (Note: Runners-up in the unofficial 2008 German Supercup. Six-time winners and one-time runners-up in the DFL-Ligapokal.)

== Match ==
=== Summary ===
Arjen Robben had put Bayern Munich ahead in the 49th minute from close range after goalkeeper Koen Casteels had fumbled a cross from the left from Douglas Costa. Nicklas Bendtner leveled the game in the 89th minute scoring at the near post after a cross from Kevin De Bruyne from the right. Bendtner went on to score the decisive penalty in the penalty shoot-out shooting high into the top left corner as Wolfsburg won 5–4.

=== Details ===
1 August 2015
20:30 CEST

VfL Wolfsburg	1–1	Bayern Munich
Bendtner 89'	Report	Robben 49'
Penalties
Rodriguez (penalty scored); De Bruyne (penalty scored); Schürrle (penalty scored); Kruse (penalty scored); Bendtner (penalty scored)	5–4	(penalty scored) Vidal; (penalty missed) Alonso; (penalty scored) Robben; (penalty scored) Lahm; (penalty scored) Douglas Costa

Volkswagen Arena, Wolfsburg
Attendance: 30,000
Referee: Marco Fritz (Korb)

**VfL Wolfsburg**	**Bayern Munich**

GK	28	(Belgium) Koen Casteels
RB	8	(Portugal) Vieirinha
CB	25	(Brazil) Naldo (c)	(yellow card) 71'
CB	5	(Switzerland) Timm Klose
LB	34	(Switzerland) Ricardo Rodriguez
CM	23	(France) Josuha Guilavogui	(yellow card) 35'
CM	27	(Germany) Maximilian Arnold
RW	7	(Italy) Daniel Caligiuri		(substituted off) 63'
AM	14	(Belgium) Kevin De Bruyne
LW	9	(Croatia) Ivan Perišić	(yellow card) 77'	(substituted off) 70'
CF	12	(Netherlands) Bas Dost		(substituted off) 70'
Substitutions:
GK	20	(Germany) Max Grün
DF	4	(Germany) Marcel Schäfer
DF	15	(Germany) Christian Träsch
DF	31	(Germany) Robin Knoche
MF	17	(Germany) André Schürrle		(substituted on) 63'
FW	3	(Denmark) Nicklas Bendtner		(substituted on) 70'
FW	11	(Germany) Max Kruse		(substituted on) 70'
Manager:
(Germany) Dieter Hecking

GK	1	(Germany) Manuel Neuer
RB	21	(Germany) Philipp Lahm (c)
CB	17	(Germany) Jérôme Boateng
CB	5	(Morocco) Medhi Benatia
LB	27	(Austria) David Alaba
CM	6	(Spain) Thiago		(substituted off) 74'
CM	14	(Spain) Xabi Alonso
AM	25	(Germany) Thomas Müller		(substituted off) 84'
RW	10	(Netherlands) Arjen Robben
CF	9	(Poland) Robert Lewandowski		(substituted off) 72'
LW	11	(Brazil) Douglas Costa	(yellow card) 21'
Substitutions:
GK	26	(Germany) Sven Ulreich
DF	13	(Brazil) Rafinha		(substituted on) 72'
DF	18	(Spain) Juan Bernat
MF	19	(Germany) Mario Götze		(substituted on) 84'
MF	20	(Germany) Sebastian Rode
MF	23	(Chile) Arturo Vidal	(yellow card) 82'	(substituted on) 74'
MF	32	(Germany) Joshua Kimmich
Manager:
(Spain) Pep Guardiola

Man of the Match:
Nicklas Bendtner (VfL Wolfsburg)

Assistant referees:
Dominik Schaal (Tübingen)
Marcel Pelgrim (Hamminkeln-Loikum)
Fourth official:
Jochen Drees (Münster-Sarmsheim)

== See also ==
- 2015–16 Bundesliga
- 2015–16 DFB-Pokal
