= Thomas Müller =

German footballer (born 1989)

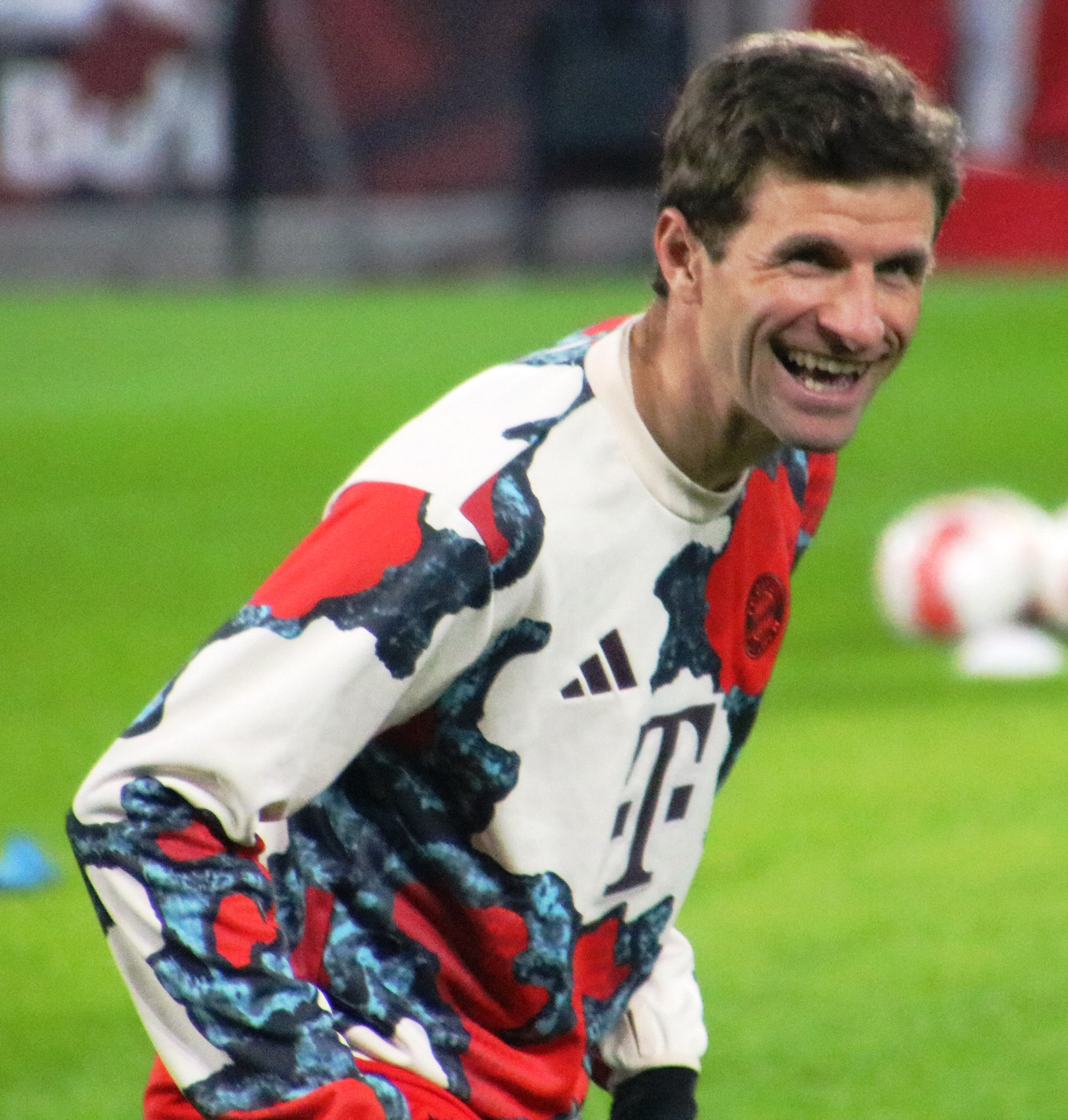
- Müller with Bayern Munich in 2025

Personal information
- Full name: Thomas Müller
- Date of birth: 13 September 1989 (age 37)
- Place of birth: Weilheim in Oberbayern, West Germany
- Height: 1.85 m (6 ft 1 in)
- Positions: Forward; attacking midfielder

Team information
- Current team: Vancouver Whitecaps
- Number: 13

Youth career
- 1993–2000: TSV Pähl
- 2000–2007: Bayern Munich

Senior career*
Years	Team	Apps	(Gls)
2007–2009	Bayern Munich II	35	(16)
2008–2025	Bayern Munich	503	(150)
2025–	Vancouver Whitecaps	32	(16)

International career
2004–2005	Germany U16	6	(0)
2007	Germany U19	3	(0)
2008	Germany U20	1	(1)
2009	Germany U21	6	(1)
2010–2024	Germany	131	(45)
Medal record
Men's football
Representing Germany
FIFA World Cup
Winner	2014 Brazil	Team
Bronze medal – third place	2010 South Africa	Team
UEFA European Championship
Bronze medal – third place	2012 Poland–Ukraine	Team
- * Club domestic league appearances and goals as of 03:23, 8 November 2026 (UTC)

Thomas Müller (German pronunciation: [ˈtoːmas ˈmʏlɐ]; born 13 September 1989) is a German professional footballer who plays as a forward or attacking midfielder for Major League Soccer club Vancouver Whitecaps. He is widely regarded as one of the greatest players of his generation. Nicknamed "der Raumdeuter" (the 'interpreter of space'), Müller has been praised for his positioning, finishing, work-rate, and consistency in both scoring and creating goals. He is both the all-time German top goalscorer and assist provider in the UEFA Champions League.

As a product of Bayern Munich's youth system, which he joined at age 10 in 2000, Müller played for the club until 2025. With Bayern, he won a record thirteen Bundesliga titles, six DFB-Pokals, eight DFL-Supercups, two UEFA Champions League titles, two UEFA Super Cups, and two FIFA Club World Cups. He joined the first team in the 2009–10 season after Louis van Gaal was appointed as the main coach; he played almost every game that season as Bayern won the league and cup double and reached the 2010 Champions League final. Müller also scored in the 2012 Champions League final, though Bayern lost that final on penalties. Müller scored 23 goals in the 2012–13 season as Bayern won a historic treble; the league title, cup and Champions League. In the 2019–20, he broke the Bundesliga record for assists in a season with 21 (a joint record in the top five leagues alongside Lionel Messi in La Liga and Bruno Fernandes in the Premier League) and scored 14 goals as Bayern won a second treble. With 756 matches played across seventeen seasons, Müller is Bayern's all-time record appearance holder, scoring 250 goals and providing 223 assists for the club across all competitions. He is one of only three players in league history to reach the landmark of 100 Bundesliga goals and 100 Bundesliga assists each (alongside Andreas Möller and Marco Reus). He also holds the record for the most UEFA Champions League appearances with one team.

Müller was called up to the Germany national team in 2010. At the 2010 FIFA World Cup, he scored five goals in six appearances as Germany finished in third place. He was named the Best Young Player of the tournament and won the Golden Boot as the tournament's top scorer. At the 2014 FIFA World Cup, he played a major role in helping the team win the trophy, as he scored five goals and received the Silver Ball as the tournament's second best player and the Silver Boot as the second top goalscorer. He was also named in the World Cup All-Star XI and in the Dream Team. He retired from international football after the UEFA Euro 2024. On 1 October 2025, Müller became the most decorated German footballer in history with 35 trophies.

== Club career ==
=== Early career ===
Müller played as a youth for TSV Pähl, and at the age of 10 he made the 50-kilometre (31 mi) journey to join local Bundesliga side Bayern Munich in 2000. He progressed through the youth system and was part of the team that finished runner-up in the Under 19 Bundesliga in 2007. Growing up, his favorite player was Giovane Élber.

=== Bayern Munich ===
Müller made his debut for the reserve team in March 2008 when he replaced Stephan Fürstner in a Regionalliga match against SpVgg Unterhaching, in which he scored. He made two more Regionalliga appearances in the 2007–08 season, while continuing to play for the under-19 team. The following season, Bayern's second string qualified for the newly formed 3. Liga, and Müller established himself as a key player – he played in 32 out of 38 matches and scored 15 times to make him the league's fifth top scorer.

==== 2008–2012: Ascent into senior team and two Champions League final defeats ====
===== 2008–09 season =====
Müller became involved in the first-team under then manager Jürgen Klinsmann; he appeared in pre-season friendlies, and made his full debut on 15 August 2008, when he came on as a substitute for Miroslav Klose for the last ten minutes of a Bundesliga match against Hamburger SV. Despite Müller feeling that his performance did not go well, he made three more Bundesliga appearances that season and made his Champions League debut on 10 March 2009 when he was substituted on in the 72nd minute for Bastian Schweinsteiger in a 7–1 win over Sporting CP. He scored Bayern's last goal as they won the tie 12–1 on aggregate.

In February 2009, Müller signed his first contract for the senior team, a two-year deal effective from the 2009–10 season, along with reserve teammate Holger Badstuber.

===== 2009–10 season =====
Müller was prepared to be loaned or even transferred away to find first-team football, but when Louis van Gaal was appointed manager, both Müller and Badstuber became fixtures in the Bayern first team from the start of the season. In the first few matches, Müller was a regular substitute, and on 12 September 2009, he was brought on against Borussia Dortmund and scored two goals in a 5–1 victory. Three days later, he scored another brace in a 3–0 Champions League victory over Maccabi Haifa. He rounded off September by being named the Bundesliga Player of the Month and earned praise from his namesake, legendary former Bayern and Germany striker Gerd Müller. After the Haifa match, Müller was in the starting XI for almost every match, only missing one match, a Champions League match against Bordeaux, for which he was suspended, because he was sent off in an earlier match against the same team.

In February 2010, Müller signed a new contract with Bayern Munich through 2013. During the second half of the season, Müller continued to be a regular first-team starter, usually playing in a central striking role due to the availability of other wide players Franck Ribéry and Arjen Robben. In April 2010, he scored the second goal in a 2–1 win against title rivals Schalke 04, and in the penultimate league match of the season, he scored the first hat-trick of his career, in a 3–1 win over VfL Bochum which effectively secured the German title for Bayern. The title was confirmed a week later with a 3–1 win at Hertha BSC, a match which Müller started.

For the season, Müller played in all 34 Bundesliga matches, starting 29, and recorded 13 goals and 11 assists. Bayern and Müller were back in Berlin the following week, to face Werder Bremen in the final of the DFB-Pokal. He started the match and Bayern won 4–0 to complete the domestic double. Müller scored four goals and made two assists during the competition, which made him its leading scorer for the season. Bayern's season ended in pursuit of a first treble, in the 2010 Champions League Final against Inter Milan at Santiago Bernabéu Stadium in Madrid. It was not to be, however, as they lost 2–0, with both goals coming from Diego Milito. Müller was in the starting line-up and had a key chance just after half-time, with Bayern 1–0 down, but his shot was saved by Júlio César. Müller felt particularly disappointed by this defeat, but he ended his first season as a first-team player with 52 matches played and 19 goals in all competitions.

In a poll conducted by the sports magazine kicker, he was voted by his fellow professionals as the best newcomer of the 2009–10 season and was named in the Bundesliga Team of the Season. Müller credits Van Gaal for having had the biggest part to play in his rise to success – the coach arrived with a reputation for promoting youth team players, particularly at Ajax, and consistently gave Müller his chance in the first-team, going as far to say "Müller spielt bei mir immer" ("with me, Müller will always play"). Müller, in return, described Van Gaal as "a genius technician" who makes players "improve every time".

===== 2010–11 season =====
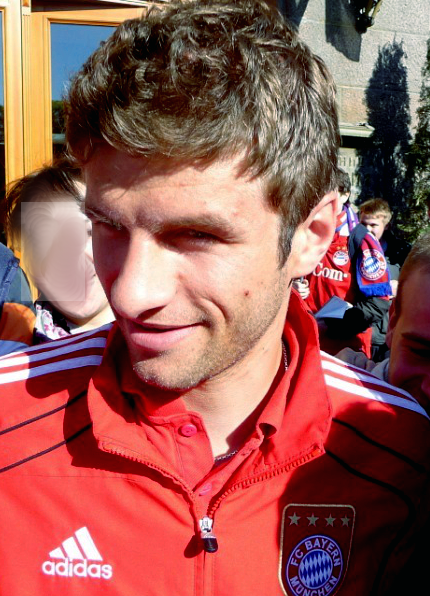
Müller with Bayern Munich in Saint Petersburg, Russia, May 2011

Müller returned from his post-World Cup break to sign another contract extension, this time extending his stay at Bayern until 2015. As with all of Bayern's World Cup participants, he missed much of pre-season, and his first match back was the Supercup against Schalke 04 on 7 August. He was named in the starting 11, and scored the opening goal in a 2–0 win. Two weeks later he scored the opening goal of Bayern's league season in a 2–1 home win against VfL Wolfsburg.

Müller played in every match of the first half of the season, usually as a starter, but as the team struggled for results, Müller was unable to match the previous season's goalscoring exploits, being dropped to the bench, and even receiving a telling off from Louis van Gaal after missing an easy chance in a 2–0 defeat against 1. FC Kaiserslautern in August. He was philosophical about this dip in form, though, and after eight league games without a goal, he scored in a 4–1 win against Eintracht Frankfurt on 27 November; He followed that by scoring in consecutive league and cup wins against VfB Stuttgart three weeks later. These goals took his tally to eight goals in all competitions and included a spectacular goal to open the scoring in a 2–0 Champions League victory against Roma on 15 September.

As his team was on its winter break, Müller was left to reflect on what he described as "an almost unbelievable first year as a pro". Müller began the second half of the season in good form, but was involved in an altercation with teammate Arjen Robben, who was angered when Müller showed his displeasure at a poor free-kick Robben took during a 3–1 win at Werder Bremen. Müller again played in every game of the season and scored 19 goals (12 in the league), but the season was less successful for Bayern, as they finished third in the league, and were knocked out of the DFB-Pokal in the semi-finals by Schalke 04 and in the round of 16 of the UEFA Champions League by Inter Milan; Bayern had won 1–0 at the San Siro, and Müller scored 31 minutes into the second leg to make it 3–1 on aggregate, but Inter levelled the score at 3–3 in the 88th minute to go through on the away goals rule. Müller's mentor Van Gaal was increasingly criticised for inflexibility in tactical, transfer and selection policy, and ultimately lost his job, being replaced with Jupp Heynckes.

===== 2011–12 season =====
In Bayern's first DFB-Pokal game, Müller was awarded the man of the match after earning two penalties which were converted by Mario Gómez and Bastian Schweinsteiger, Müller then added a third in the closing stages to secure a 3–0 victory over Eintracht Braunschweig. It took Müller five matches for him to get his first league goal; he scored it against Schalke 04 in Bayern's 2–0 win. Müller then scored in Bayern's next home game in the early stages of the match, which they went on to win, 3–0. On 26 November 2011, Müller netted the opener on the half-hour in Bayern's 6–0 thrashing of FC Ingolstadt, giving him his second DFB-Pokal goal. Müller was on the short-list of this year's FIFA Ballon d'Or award. On 10 and 15 January, in Bayern's warm up friendlies, Müller scored three goals in two games, a brace against the India national team (which Bayern then went on to win 4–0) and one goal in Bayern's other 4–0 victory over Rot-Weiß Erfurt. Müller provided two assists in Bayern's win over VfB Stuttgart in the DFB-Pokal.

On 11 February, Bayern played 1. FC Kaiserslautern and Müller ended a goal drought lasting since 24 September 2011 with a header in their 2–0 victory. On 31 March 2012, Müller played his 100th Bundesliga game against 1. FC Nürnberg. On 19 May 2012, Müller scored the opening goal in the 83rd minute of the Champions League final against Chelsea with a powerful header, before being substituted for defender Daniel Van Buyten moments later. Bayern, however, then conceded a late equaliser, and would go on to lose the final on penalties. Müller stated post match how dissatisfied he was about the amount of time he had spent on the bench recently, although also expressed his desire to stay at Bayern in spite of this. During the season, Müller had scored seven goals in 34 league matches, two goals in five German Cup matches, and two goals in 14 Champions League matches.

==== 2012–2023: Consecutive Bundesliga titles and European success ====
===== 2012–13 season =====
Müller's first Bundesliga goal of the season came over 2. Bundesliga champions SpVgg Greuther Fürth in Bayern's 3–0 victory on 27 August 2012. On 2 September, he netted a brace as Bayern thrashed southern rivals VfB Stuttgart, 6–1, in front of 71,000 at the newly expanded Allianz Arena. Müller helped Bayern achieve a record-breaking start to the league season, when he netted a brace over newly promoted Fortuna Düsseldorf on 20 October in their 5–0 victory, recording Bayern's eighth successive win. Three days later, he scored his first Champions League goal of the season, netting from the penalty spot, as Bayern defeated Lille 1–0 at the French side's newly built Grand Stade Lille Métropole.

On 13 December, after his good run of form in the first half of the Bundesliga season, Müller pledged his allegiance claiming he was at home in Munich and that, "There is no club to step up from when you leave FC Bayern... there almost is no better club." Six days later, he signed a two-year contract extension, keeping him at the Allianz Arena until 2017. At the winter break in the Bundesliga, he had nine goals and seven assists in 16 league appearances and a further three goals in the Champions League; this gave him a total of 13 goals halfway through the season, including his strike against Borussia Dortmund in Bayern's win in the 2012 DFL-Supercup. Müller scored his first goal in Bayern's second game back from the break in a 2–0 away win over VfB Stuttgart. Müller tapped in his fifth goal of the Champions League campaign on 2 April, completing a 2–0 first leg defeat of Juventus in the quarter-finals, ending the Italian club's 18-match unbeaten record in Europe.

On 23 April 2013, Müller scored two goals and gave an assist in a 4–0 win against Barcelona in the first leg of the Champions League semi-finals at the Allianz Arena. In the return fixture at the Camp Nou, Müller scored a header as Bayern won 3–0 to hand Barcelona their biggest ever aggregate defeat in the Champions League, with a 7–0 scoreline across the two matches. Müller then went on to play an important role in Bayern's 2–1 victory over Borussia Dortmund in the final. On 1 June, Müller scored a penalty in the final of the 2012–13 DFB-Pokal as Bayern won the cup 3–2 against VFB Stuttgart to complete a historic treble. Müller scored 23 goals during the season across all competitions, netting 13 in the Bundesliga, one in the Pokal, and eight in the Champions League; he also scored one goal in the 2012 DFL-Supercup as Bayern won the match 2–1.

===== 2013–14 season =====
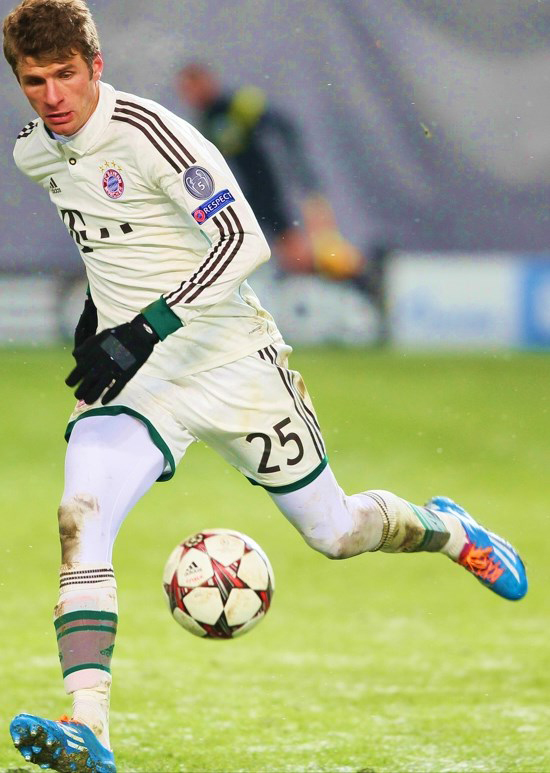
Müller playing for Bayern Munich in 2013

Müller began the 2013–14 season under new manager Pep Guardiola by playing in the German Super Cup. On 5 August, Müller scored a hat-trick as Bayern won 5–0 in the team's 2013–14 DFB-Pokal first-round game against Schwarz-Weiß Rehden. In Bayern's opening 2013–14 Bundesliga fixture, Müller missed a penalty for the first time. Seconds later, the save from the penalty flicked the hand of Álvaro Domínguez which resulted in another penalty which David Alaba converted. After this, Müller stated, "I am still happy to take penalties, but I think David Alaba is the main man for spot kicks for now." He played in the UEFA Super Cup.

On 25 September, against Hannover 96 in the second round of the DFB-Pokal, Müller scored twice taking his cup tally to five goals in just two games. On 28 September, Müller scored the only goal in a 1–0 victory over VfL Wolfsburg, giving him his first goal in the 2013–14 Bundesliga. Müller scored his first 2013–14 UEFA Champions League goal of the campaign and Bayern defeated Manchester City 3–1 at the City of Manchester Stadium on 2 October. He later played in the FIFA Club World Cup final which ended in a 2–0 win over Raja Casablanca.

On 9 April, Müller scored Bayern's second goal in a 3–1 second leg defeat of Manchester United in the Champions League quarter-finals. On 17 May 2014, He scored Bayern's second goal in a 2–0 extra-time defeat of Borussia Dortmund in the 2014 DFB-Pokal Final, giving die Roten the tenth league and cup double in their history. Müller finished as the tournament's top scorer with eight goals in five appearances. He finished the season by scoring 13 goals in 31 league matches, eight goals in five DFB-Pokal matches, and five goals in 12 Champions League matches.

===== 2014–15 season =====
After the 2013–14 season, Müller signed a new contract keeping him at Bayern until 2019 and rejected a contract offer from Manchester United. Müller played in the DFL-Supercup, which was Bayern's first match in the 2014–15 season. Bayern lost the match 2–0. His first goal of the season was against Preußen Münster in the DFB-Pokal on 17 August 2014. Then in the opening match of the Bundesliga, on 22 August 2014, Müller scored the opening goal of Bayern's Bundesliga season against VfL Wolfsburg. Bayern went on to win the match 2–1.

On 11 March 2015, Müller scored two goals against Shakhtar Donetsk in a 7–0 win to draw level with former teammate Mario Gómez as the top-scoring German player in UEFA Champions League history. He subsequently became the leader when he scored in a 6–1 win against Porto on 21 April 2015. He finished the season with 13 goals in 32 league matches, a goal in five DFB-Pokal matches, and seven goals in ten Champions League matches.

===== 2015–16 season =====
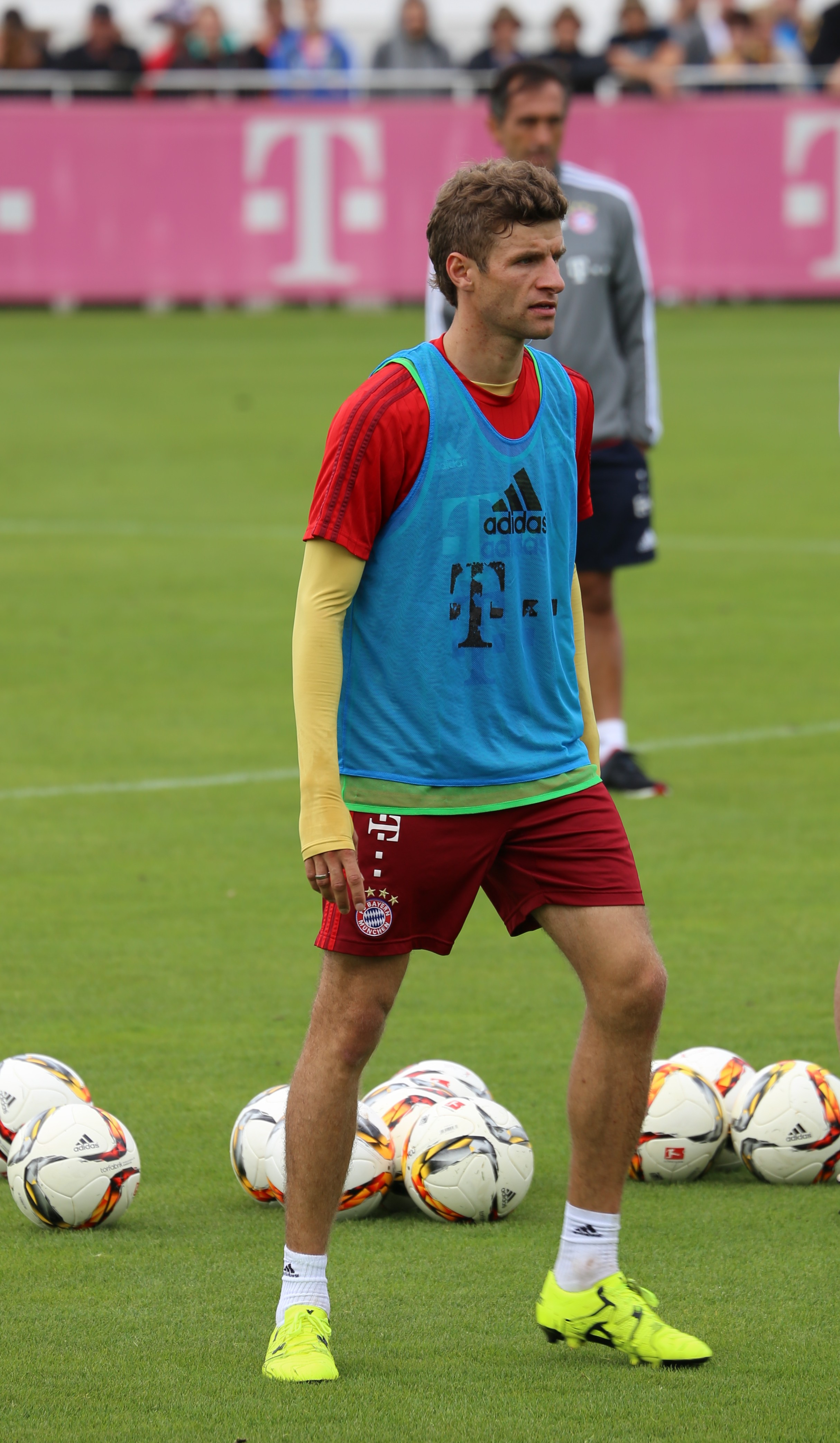
Müller at a training session with Bayern Munich in 2015

Müller started the season by playing in the DFL-Supercup against VfL Wolfsburg. He started the league season with two goals against Hamburger SV, a goal against 1899 Hoffenheim, two goals against Bayer Leverkusen, and a goal against FC Augsburg in the first four matchdays. He had scored from the penalty spot against Bayer Leverkusen and Augsburg. He failed to score in his next three Bundesliga matches. He failed to convert a penalty shot against Mainz 05 on matchday seven. His next Bundesliga goal came when he scored two goals against Borussia Dortmund on matchday eight. One of the goals was scored from the penalty spot. His goalscoring continued in other competitions. He scored two goals against Wolfsburg in the second round of the DFB-Pokal, and in Champions League, two goals against Olympiacos, two goals against Arsenal, and a goal in the return leg against Olympiacos. In scoring in the home win over Olympiacos, Müller became the youngest player to win 50 UEFA Champions League games, beating the record of Lionel Messi by 14 months.

On 9 December 2015, Müller came on as a 46th-minute substitute for Franck Ribéry in a 2–0 win against Dinamo Zagreb. He failed to convert his penalty shot in the match and finished the group stage with five goals from six appearances. On 18 December, Müller signed a new contract with Bayern, keeping him at the club until 2021. On 19 December, Bayern defeated Hannover 96 1–0 with a goal from the penalty mark from Müller. Bayern went on winter break after the match. Müller finished the first half of the league with 14 goals from 17 appearances. This includes scoring five goals from the penalty mark in six opportunities. He had scored 21 goals in 25 appearances in all competitions up until the winter break.

On 12 March 2016, Müller scored a brace in a 5–0 victory over Werder Bremen. Four days later, with Bayern trailing Juventus 1–2 in the second leg of the Champions League round of 16, he scored a 91st-minute equaliser before Bayern won in extra time 4–2 (6–4 aggregate). On 19 April, Müller scored both goals in Bayern's 2–0 defeat of Werder Bremen in the DFB-Pokal semi-final. His first goal of the match was his 150th for the club in all competitions. On 3 May, Müller had a penalty kick saved by Jan Oblak in the Champions League semi-final second leg at home to Atlético Madrid. The match ended in a 2–1 win for Bayern but the team was knocked out on the away goals rule. He finished the season by scoring 20 goals in 31 league matches, 4 goals in 5 German Cup matches, and 8 goals in 12 Champions League matches. He didn't score in the German Super Cup. With 32 goals in all Competitions, this was Müller's most prolific season to date.

===== 2016–17 season =====
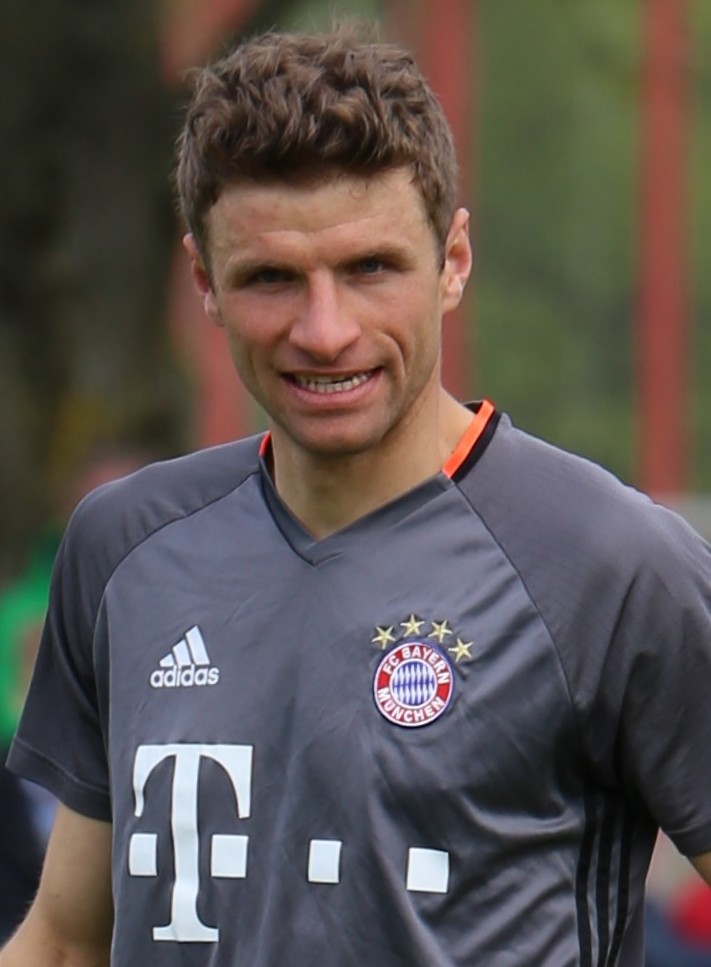
Müller with Bayern Munich at a training session in 2017

Müller started the season by winning and scoring in the 2016 German Super Cup against Borussia Dortmund on 14 August 2016. In the league, Müller did not score for 999 minutes until he scored during a home game against VfL Wolfsburg in the 76th minute. He finished the 2016–17 season by scoring five goals in 29 Bundesliga appearances, no goals in three German Cup appearances, and three goals in nine Champions League appearances. Müller also provided 12 assists in the Bundesliga.

Several German football experts like Lothar Matthäus blamed manager Carlo Ancelotti for Müller's struggles in front of the goal. Ancelotti often preferred Thiago Alcântara as the player playing behind the striker, Müller's traditional position. Müller was often benched for the most crucial matches in Europe and in the Bundesliga.

===== 2017–18 season =====
Müller started the 2017–18 season by playing in the 2017 German Super Cup. He played in the opening 67 minutes before being replaced by Kingsley Coman. His first goal of the season came on 16 September 2017 against Mainz on matchday four of the Bundesliga. On 21 January 2018, he scored two goals against Werder Bremen in the Bundesliga, with his second goal in the match being his 100th in the competition.

On 20 February, Müller scored two goals against Beşiktaş in the first leg of the Champions League round of 16. On 17 April, Müller scored a hat-trick in Bayern's 6–2 defeat of Bayer Leverkusen in the DFB-Pokal semi-finals. Overall, Müller scored eight goals and provided 14 assists in 29 league matches.

===== 2018–19 season =====
Müller started the 2018–19 season by starting in the German Super Cup. Müller scored in the first two matchdays in the Bundesliga season. He scored in the second round of the German Cup against SV Rödinghausen. He scored two goals against Fortuna Düsseldorf in the Bundesliga on 24 November 2018. On 12 December, Müller played his 105th Champions League match in a match against Ajax and therefore leveling former club captain Philipp Lahm as the record appearance holder in the Champions League at Bayern. In that same match, Müller was sent off for the first time in his career for a straight red card. This resulted in a two-match suspension.

On 15 December, Müller made his 300th Bundesliga appearance for Bayern against Hannover 96. On 18 May 2019, Müller won his seventh consecutive Bundesliga title as Bayern finished two points above Dortmund with 78 points. It was Müller's eighth Bundesliga title. A week later, He won his fifth DFB-Pokal title with the club as Bayern defeated RB Leipzig 3–0 in the 2019 DFB-Pokal final.

===== 2019–20 season =====
On 2 November 2019, Müller made his 500th competitive appearance for Bayern, becoming the tenth Bayern player in history to reach this mark since the club's promotion to the Bundesliga in 1965. The following month, he became the first-ever player to register 11 assists in the first half of a Bundesliga season, achieving the new record in his side's 2–0 win over Wolfsburg. On 7 April 2020, Müller signed a two-year contract extension keeping him at Bayern until 2023. He recorded his 20th assist of the Bundesliga season in an away match against Bayer Leverkusen on matchday 30, breaking the record for most Bundesliga assists in a season, previously held by Kevin De Bruyne and Emil Forsberg. He provided another assist in an away match against Wolfsburg on Matchday 34, to finish off the season with a record of 21 assists.

On 14 August, Müller scored a brace and assisted another in the 2019–20 UEFA Champions League quarter-final match against Barcelona, which ended in an 8–2 win. Later on, Bayern won 1–0 over Paris Saint-Germain in the final, which marked the club's sixth Champions League title and Müller's second Champions League title. He finished the season by scoring 8 goals in 33 league matches, two goals in six German Cup matches, and 4 goals in 10 Champions League matches.

===== 2020–21 season =====
On 18 September 2020, Müller scored his first goal of the season, and provided one assist, in an emphatic 8–0 league win over Schalke 04. He later managed to win both the UEFA Super Cup and the DFL-Supercup with the latter being his 27th trophy of his club career; hence, Müller became the most decorated footballer in German history, breaking the previous record of 26 trophies won by his former Bayern teammate Bastian Schweinsteiger. On 11 February 2021, Müller tested positive for COVID-19 and went into quarantine; hence, could not play in the 2020 FIFA Club World Cup Final. However, Bayern went on to win the final 1–0 against Mexican side Tigres UANL which completed their continental sextuple. On 8 May, Müller won his ninth consecutive Bundesliga title as Bayern finished the league in first place with 78 points, 13 points ahead of second-placed Borussia Dortmund. It was Müller's 10th Bundesliga title overall.

===== 2021–22 season =====
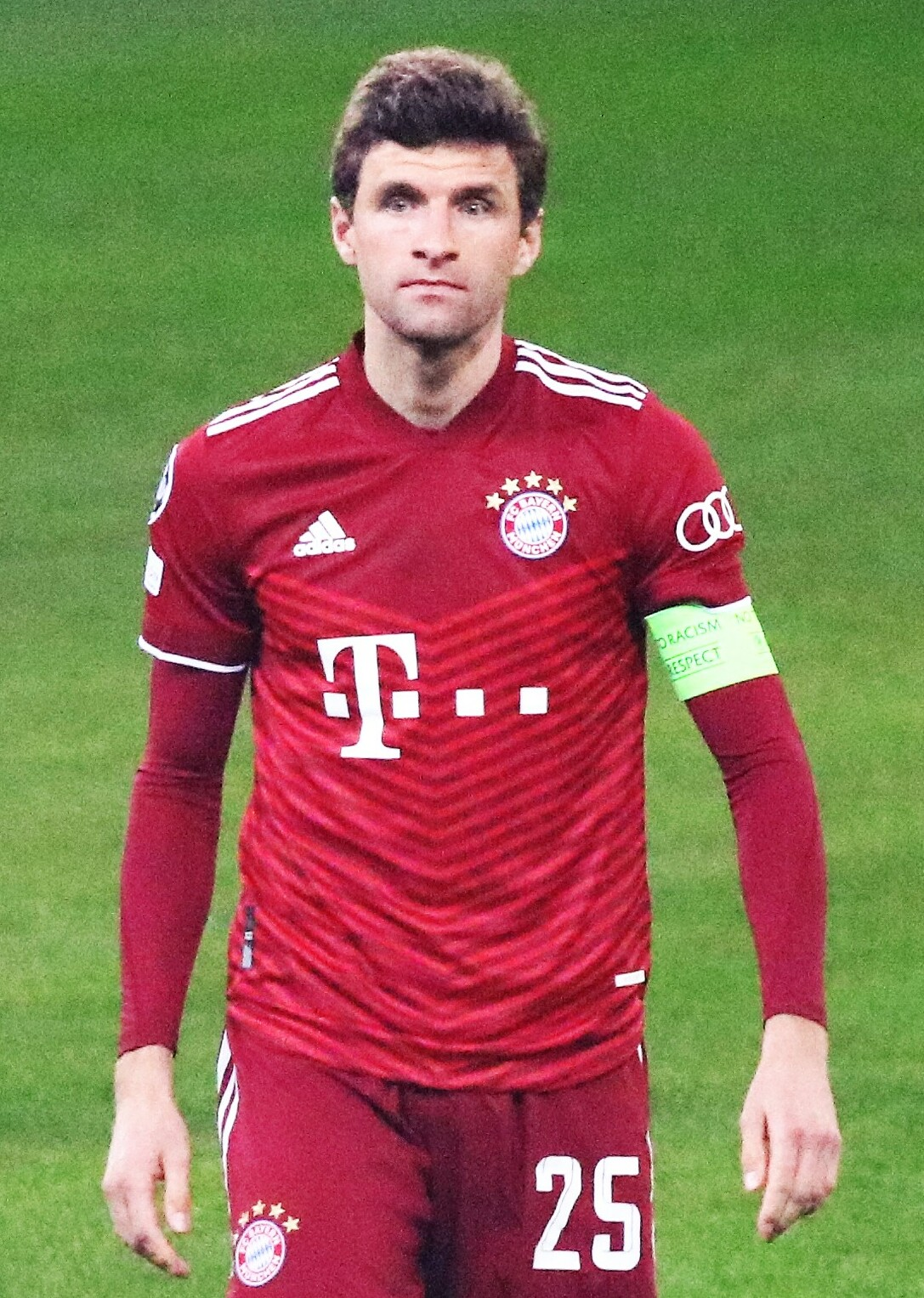
Müller playing for Bayern Munich in 2022

On 17 August 2021, Müller scored his first goal of the season, and provided one assist, in a 3–1 away win against Borussia Dortmund in the 2021 DFL-Supercup. On 19 November, Müller made his 600th appearance for Bayern in a 2–1 loss to Augsburg, becoming the fourth overall appearance maker behind Sepp Maier, Gerd Müller and Oliver Kahn. On 8 December, Müller scored his 50th goal in the UEFA Champions League against Barcelona in a 3–0 win, becoming only the 8th player in the competition's history to do so.

On 17 December, Müller played his 400th match in the Bundesliga, scored one goal and assisted another in a 4–0 home win over Wolfsburg. On 23 April 2022, following a 3–1 win against Dortmund in Der Klassiker, Bayern won their 10th consecutive Bundesliga title, in the process, making Müller the player with the most Bundesliga title wins in history with 11. On 3 May, Müller extended his contract with Bayern, keeping him at the club until the end of the 2023–24 season.

===== 2022–23 season =====
On 1 April 2023, Müller scored a brace in a 4–2 win over Dortmund as Bayern regain top position in the league. Eventually, Bayern won their 11th consecutive Bundesliga title on goal difference ahead of Dortmund; meanwhile, Müller extended his record by winning his 12th league title overall. He finished the season by scoring 8 goals in 40 matches in all Competitions.

==== 2023–2025: Final Bayern seasons ====
===== 2023–24 season =====
On 18 August 2023, Müller came off the bench in the 84th minute in a 4–0 away win over Werder Bremen in the opening match, in which he managed to participate in 16 Bundesliga seasons to become the first player to achieve this feat at the club. On 20 September, he featured in a 4–3 win over Manchester United in the opening match of the Champions League, to become the third player to reach 100 wins in the competition, after Cristiano Ronaldo and Iker Casillas. On 19 December 2023, he extended his contract with Bayern until June 2025.

On 3 February 2024, Müller became the first player to reach 500 wins with Bayern in a 3–1 league victory over Borussia Mönchengladbach. On 6 April, he featured in his 700th match for Bayern in a 3–2 away loss against Heidenheim. On 30 April, he played his 150th Champions League match in a 2–2 draw against Real Madrid in the semi-finals, becoming the third player to achieve this feat with one club, following Xavi and Iker Casillas. On 8 May, in the return leg, he featured in his 151st game, matching Xavi's record of most matches for one club in the competition. On the final matchday of the season, he equaled Sepp Maier's record of most Bundesliga appearances for Bayern with 473 matches. He finished the season by scoring 7 goals in 41 matches in all competitions.

===== 2024–25 season =====
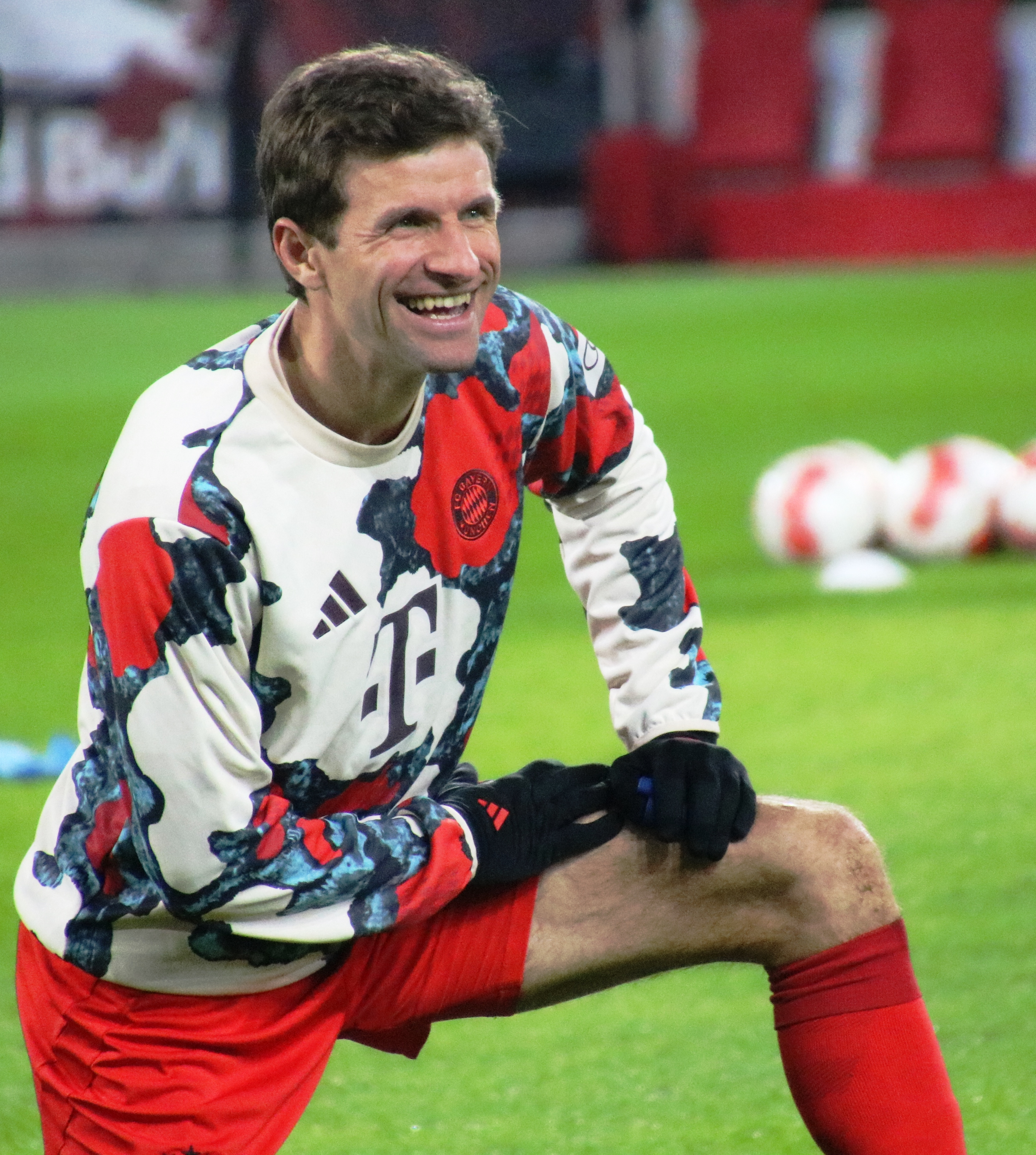
Müller warming up for Bayern Munich in 2025

On 16 August 2024, Müller scored his club's first goals of the season, by netting a brace in a 4–0 away win over Ulm in the DFB-Pokal. On 25 August, he played in the league opening match against Wolfsburg, reaching a record of 474 Bundesliga appearances with the club, in addition to equaling Sepp Maier's record of 709 competitive appearances for Bayern. On 1 September, on the second matchday against Freiburg, he set a new record for the most appearances for Bayern, reaching a total of 710 matches across all competitions while scoring his team's second goal, which also marked his 150th in the Bundesliga.

On 17 September, Müller featured in his 152nd Champions League match which ended in a 9–2 victory over Dinamo Zagreb, breaking previous record of Xavi as the player with most appearances for one club in the competition. On matchday six of the UEFA Champions League, he scored his first goal of the competition's season in a 5–1 away victory over Shakhtar Donetsk. This meant he had scored in sixteen Champions League seasons, catching up with Ryan Giggs and Cristiano Ronaldo; only Lionel Messi and Karim Benzema scored in more seasons. On 20 December 2024, Müller became the first player in history to win 350 Bundesliga matches, in a 5–1 home victory against RB Leipzig.

In late March 2025, reports emerged that Müller's contract with Bayern would not be renewed. On 5 April, it was confirmed that Müller would leave Bayern at the end of the 2024–25 season, bringing his 25 years with the club to an end. In his first match after his departure was announced, Müller came on as a substitute and scored a late equaliser in a 2–1 loss against Inter Milan in the Champions League quarter-finals first leg on 8 April. He would captain his team for full 90 minutes in the second leg, marking his 163rd Champions League appearance, tying Lionel Messi for third-most appearances in UCL history. The match would end in a 2–2 draw, eliminating Bayern out of the competition and marking Müller's last ever Champions League match for his side. On 26 April, he featured in his 500th Bundesliga match in a 3–0 victory over Mainz.

On 4 May, Müller secured his 13th Bundesliga title, extending his own record, and in doing so, equaled Ryan Giggs' record for the most titles in the top five European leagues. Additionally, he matched the record for the most decorated German footballer with 34 titles, sharing the achievement with former Bayern teammate Toni Kroos. On 10 May, he played his 750th match for Bayern Munich and his final match at the Allianz Arena in a 2–0 win over Borussia Mönchengladbach, marking the occasion by lifting the league trophy. On 15 June, he scored twice in Bayern's 10–0 win over Auckland City, marking his 250th goal for the club in their opening match of the FIFA Club World Cup. On 5 July, he made his final appearance for Bayern in a 2–0 loss to Paris Saint-Germain in the Club World Cup quarter-finals.

Müller (bottom center) preparing for a match against Colorado Rapids in 2026

=== Vancouver Whitecaps ===
On 6 August 2025, Müller joined Major League Soccer club Vancouver Whitecaps as a free agent, signing a contract for the remainder of the 2025 season, with a Designated Player option for 2026. He scored his first goal for the club, a second half stoppage-time penalty, in a 3–2 league home victory over St. Louis City on 23 August. On 13 September, on his 36th birthday, Müller scored a hat-trick in a 7–0 league home victory over Philadelphia Union. The Whitecaps played against neighbouring Vancouver FC in the final of the 2025 Canadian Championship on 1 October, claiming their fourth consecutive national title. Müller had a goal and an assist in the 4–2 victory, the goal being the 300th of his professional career. With his thirty-fifth trophy, he surpassed former teammate Toni Kroos as the most decorated German player. The Whitecaps finished fifth in the MLS regular season, before embarking on a deep run in the 2025 postseason. Starting with a 3–0 win over FC Dallas in the first leg of the first round, then drawing 1–1 in the second, winning on a Penalty Shootout 4–2 to win the best of three series. In the Conference Semi Finals the match was 2–2 in normal time vs Los Angeles FC and won in the Penalty shootout 4–3. With a victory over San Diego FC in the Western Conference final, the Whitecaps reached the MLS Cup for the first time in club history, in what was widely framed as a confrontation between Müller and Lionel Messi, the star of the opposing Inter Miami. Vancouver lost the final with a 1–3 score.

== International career ==
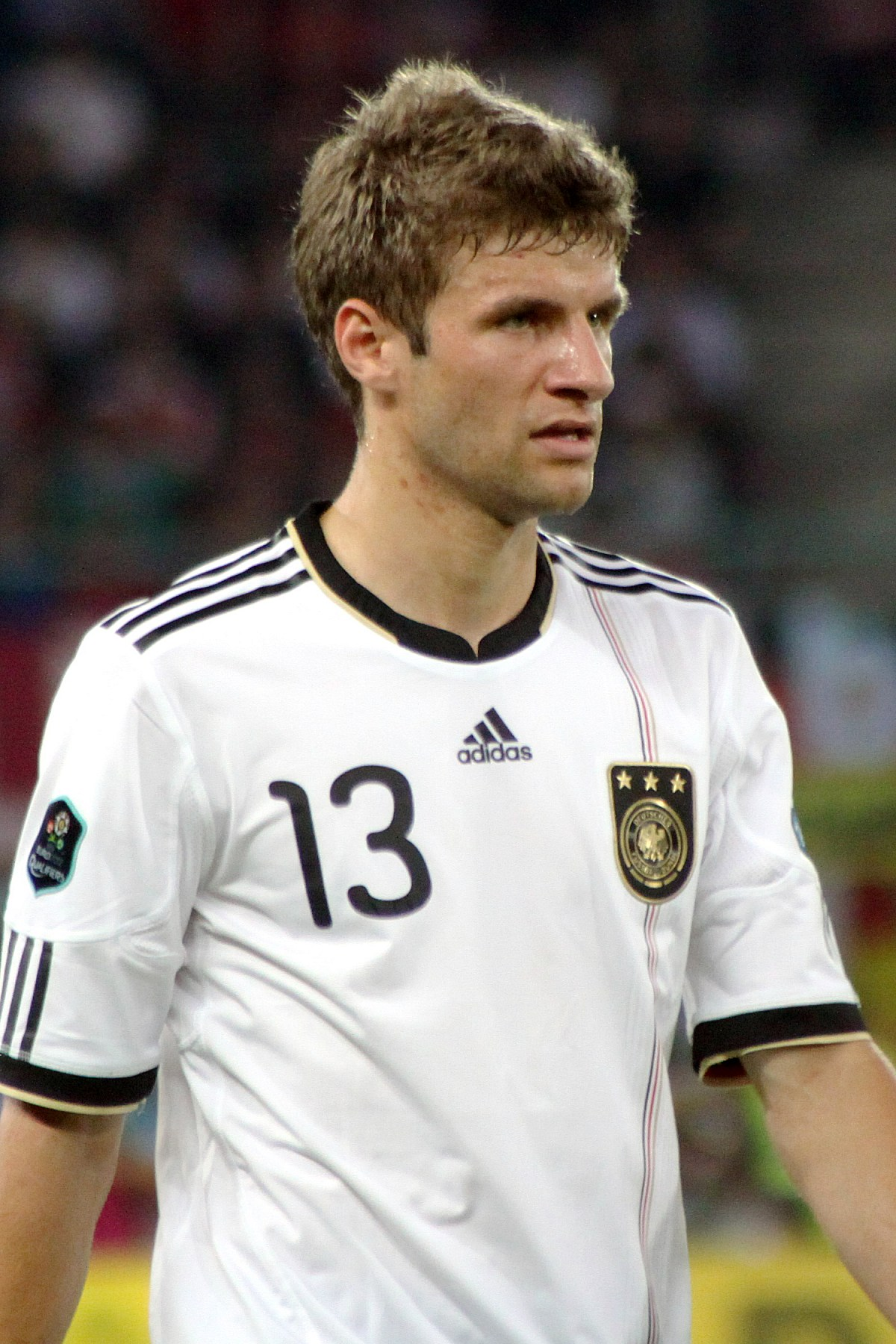
Müller wore the number 13 for Germany, a number famously worn by German legend Gerd Müller who said of his namesake; "he's going to be a great player".

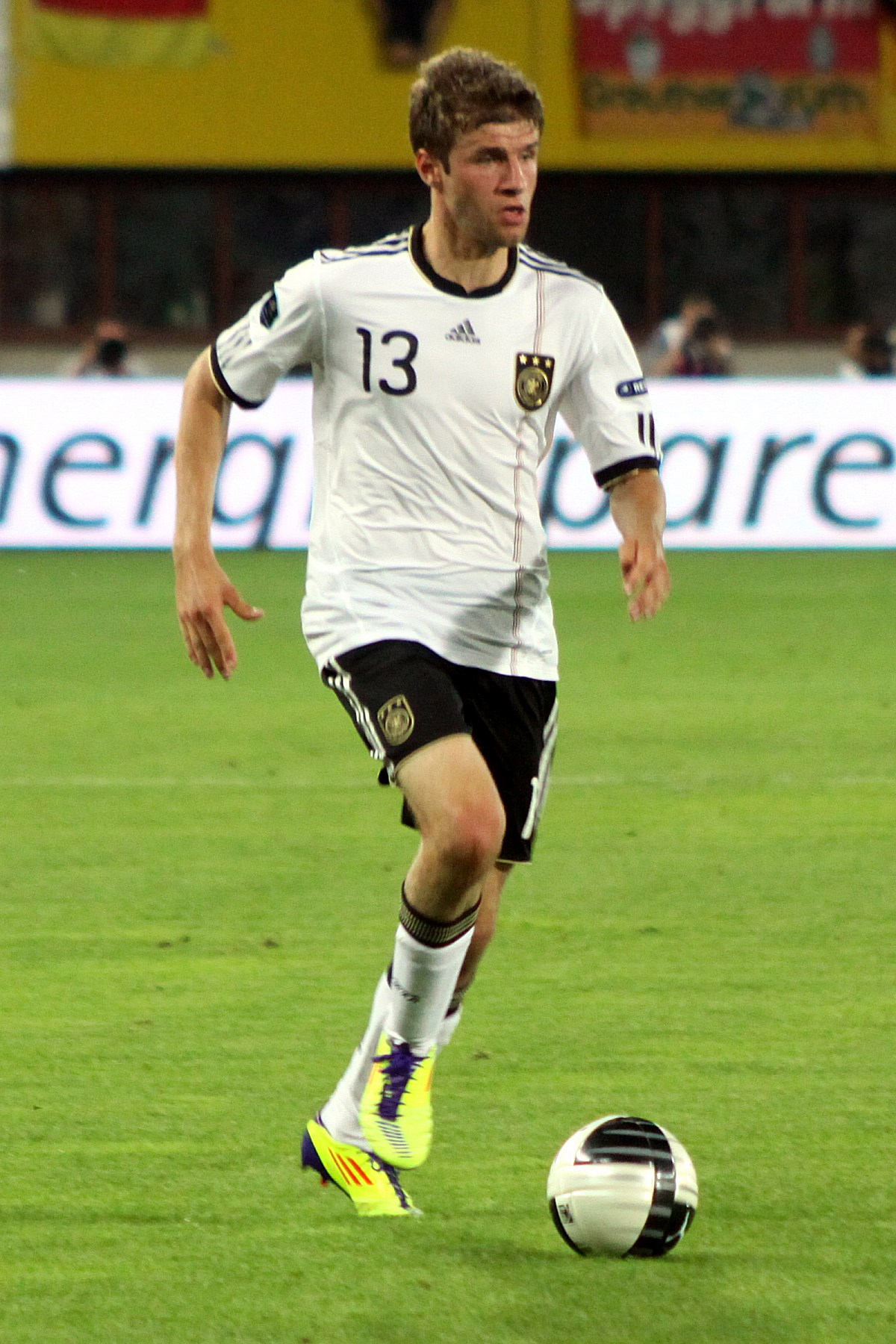
Müller with Germany in 2011

Müller represented Germany at various youth levels, starting with the under-16s in 2004. In August 2009, he was called up to the under-21 team for his debut in a 3–1 friendly defeat against Turkey. He earned six caps for the under-21s and scored one goal, the eighth in an 11–0 thrashing of San Marino.

In October of the same year, Müller's regular appearances for Bayern's first team caused Germany national team manager Joachim Löw to publicly consider him for a call-up, despite initial reluctance from the Bayern Munich board; the following month, Müller was named in the squad for a friendly against the Ivory Coast. However, this coincided with the death of national team goalkeeper Robert Enke, which led to the cancellation of a match against Chile the same week. With less opportunity to try out new players, and with the under-21 team facing crucial qualifiers for the 2011 European Championship, Löw and under-21 manager Rainer Adrion felt that Müller was needed at the under-21 level, and Müller was called back into the under-21s.

He was back in the senior squad for its next get-together, a training session in Sindelfingen in January 2010, and was named in the squad for the following match, a friendly against Argentina in March. He made his debut in this game in the starting XI at the Allianz Arena, his home stadium with Bayern. He was substituted in the 66th minute for fellow debutant Toni Kroos as Germany lost 1–0.

=== 2010 FIFA World Cup ===
Müller was named in Germany's provisional 27-man squad for the 2010 FIFA World Cup in South Africa along with seven other Bayern Munich players. Despite suffering a scare when he fell off his bicycle at the team's training camp in South Tyrol, Müller only received superficial injuries and made the final cut for the tournament when the squad was reduced to 23 players. He was allocated the number 13, normally worn by injured captain Michael Ballack, and previously worn by Müller's eponym Gerd Müller. He earned his second international cap in the final warm-up match before the World Cup when he came on as a half-time substitute for Piotr Trochowski in a 3–1 win over Bosnia and Herzegovina. He started the first game of Germany's World Cup campaign and scored the third goal – his first internationally – in a 4–0 win over Australia, winning Germany's goal of the month award in the process.

Müller played in all Germany's group games, as they finished top of Group D; he scored twice and assisted once in the 4–1 victory over England in the round of 16. In the third minute of Germany's 4–0 quarter-final win against Argentina, he opened the scoring with his fourth tournament goal. However, he picked up his second booking of the tournament in the first half, for a handball and was suspended for the semi-final defeat against Spain. Müller said that he felt far more nervous during the Spain game than any he was able to play. He returned to the team for the third-place playoff against Uruguay and scored the first goal, his fifth of the tournament, as Germany won 3–2 to take the bronze medals. The team's success was a culmination of a series of changes made after the national team's failure at Euro 2000. The Germans emphasized a more open, attack-minded style not previously associated with Germany, and included prominent young players, including Müller, Sami Khedira and Mesut Özil.

With five goals, Müller ended as joint top goalscorer of the tournament. He earned the Golden Boot with these goals and his three assists. He also won the Best Young Player Award over fellow nominees André Ayew of Ghana and Giovani dos Santos of Mexico. For both awards, he succeeded a German teammate, Miroslav Klose and Lukas Podolski, respectively, from 2006.

In October 2010, he was named on the shortlist for the FIFA Ballon d'Or award along with four of his Germany teammates. Reflecting on his World Cup success, Müller said "I basically got lucky, I hit form at just the right time".

=== UEFA Euro 2012 ===
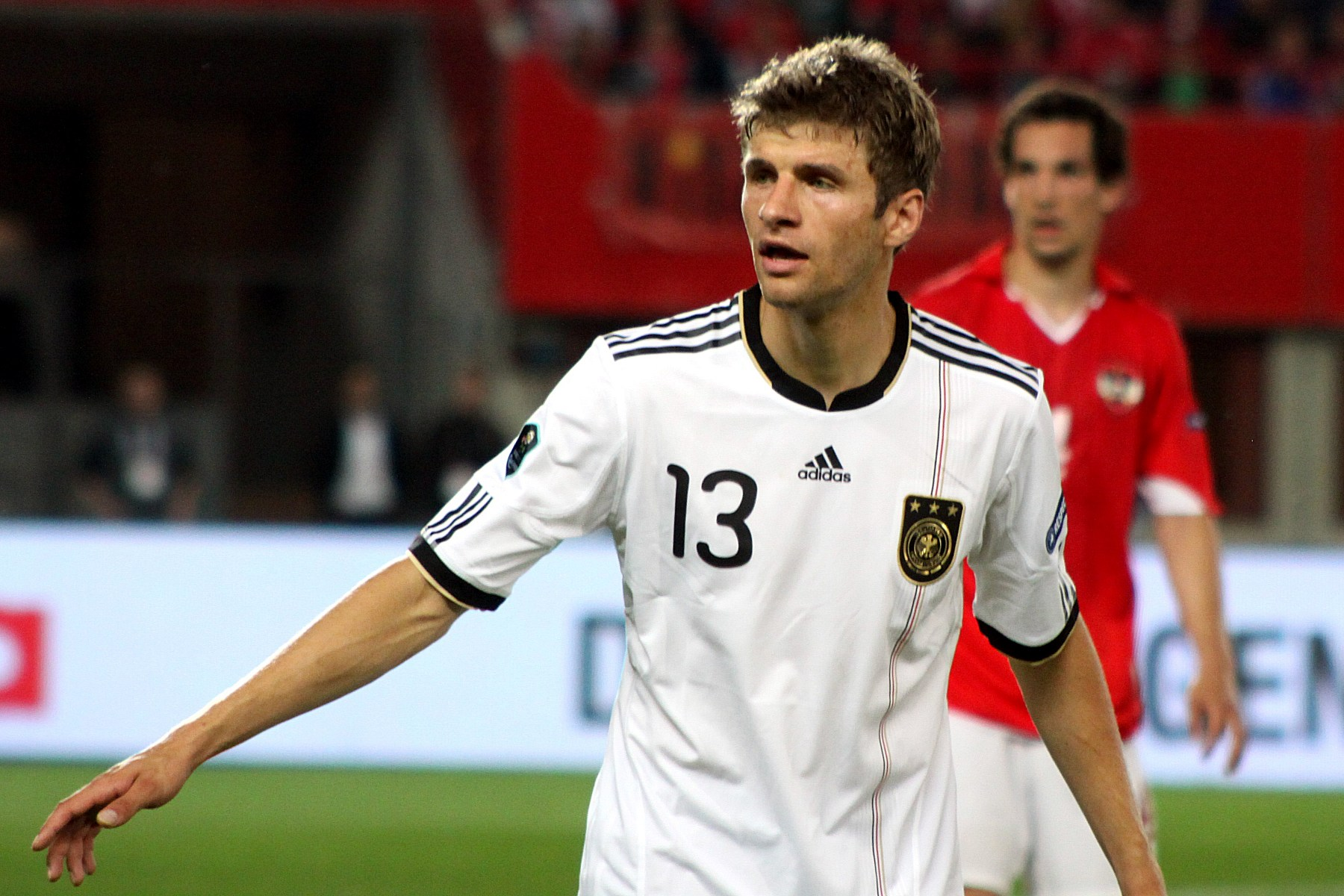
Müller in a UEFA Euro 2012 qualifying match against Austria

Müller started all ten of Germany's Euro 2012 qualifiers, as the team qualified for the finals with a 100% record. Müller provided assists for seven goals, three of which came in a 6–2 win over Austria in September 2011 which secured Germany's qualification for the finals with two games to spare. He scored three times in the campaign, two goals coming in a 4–0 win over Kazakhstan in March 2011, the third in a 3–1 win over Turkey in October of the same year.

Müller was included in Joachim Löw's squad for Euro 2012 in Poland and Ukraine, where the Germans were knocked out in the semi-finals by Italy.

=== 2014 FIFA World Cup ===
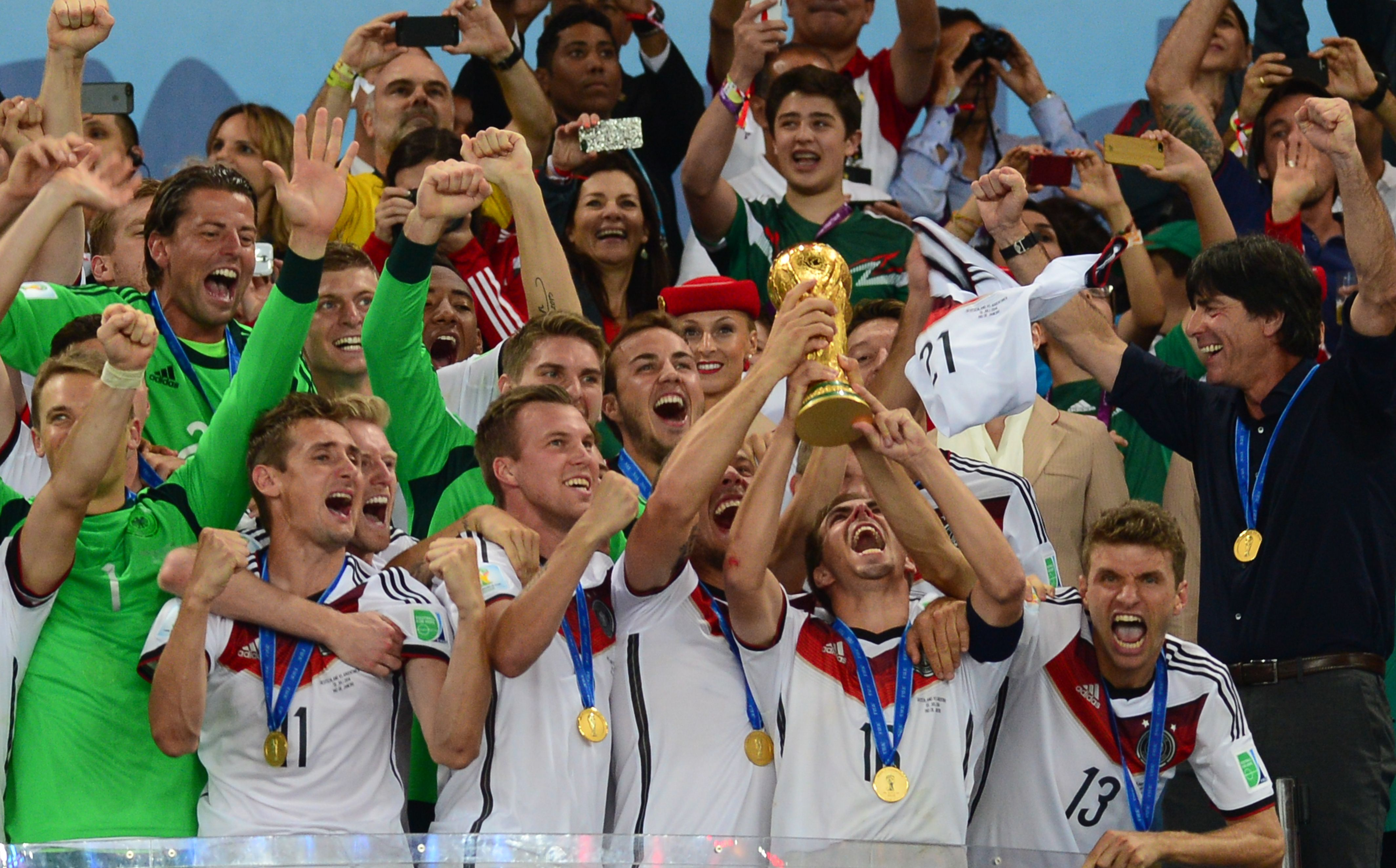
Müller (no. 13) celebrating with Germany after winning the 2014 FIFA World Cup

Müller scored his first World Cup qualifying goals on 22 March 2013, getting Germany's opener and final goal in a 3–0 away win over Kazakhstan. He also scored in the 3–0 victories over Austria and the Faroe Islands to give him four goals in Germany's successful qualification campaign.

On 16 June 2014, in Germany's opening match of the 2014 FIFA World Cup in Brazil, Müller scored the first hat-trick of the tournament and was named man of the match in a 4–0 win against Portugal. In addition, he was also the target of Pepe's headbutt in the 37th minute, which resulted in the Portuguese defender being sent off. He denied that he had "overplayed" the situation leading to the red card. On 26 June, Müller scored the only goal of the final group match against the United States to help the Germans win Group G and dispelled fear of collusion between German coach Joachim Löw and American coach Jürgen Klinsmann to play to a result that benefited both Germany and the US as had occurred in 1982.

On 8 July, Müller scored Germany's opening goal in their 7–1 semi-final defeat of Brazil. This was Germany's 2,000th goal in its history, and put Müller level with Helmut Rahn's tally of ten World Cup goals. Müller also became only the third player to score at least five goals in each of his first two World Cups (after Teófilo Cubillas and teammate Miroslav Klose).

On 11 July, Müller was named on the ten-man shortlist for FIFA's Golden Ball award for the tournament's best player. After playing all 120 minutes of Germany's final 1–0 victory against Argentina, Müller received the Silver Boot as the tournament's second-top goalscorer with five goals, and was also named in the World Cup All-Star XI, having played a major role in his team's World Cup triumph.

=== UEFA Euro 2016 ===
Müller featured in nine of ten matches during Germany's qualifying campaign for UEFA Euro 2016, scoring nine goals as Germany topped their qualifying group to qualify for Euro 2016.

Müller started in all six matches that Germany played at the finals in France. In their quarter-final match against Italy, Müller's shot was the first one to be saved in the penalty shoot-out during the tournament. His penalty miss was the first one for Germany in a major tournament shootout since Uli Stielike missed in the 1982 World Cup. Germany would still end up winning the shoot-out 6–5, however. Müller's poor run of form throughout the tournament hindered Germany's chances, and they would be eliminated by hosts France in the semi-finals. Müller exited the competition without adding a goal to his name at the European Championship.

=== 2018 FIFA World Cup ===
Müller was selected in Germany's final 23-man squad by manager Joachim Löw for the 2018 FIFA World Cup in Russia. Müller played in all three matches for Germany against Mexico, Sweden and South Korea. Müller started against Mexico and Sweden, but came on as a substitute against South Korea. Müller did not manage to score a goal as Germany crashed out of the World Cup at the group stage for the first time since 1938 following a shock loss to South Korea.

=== Exclusion from the national team ===
On 5 March 2019, national team coach Joachim Löw confirmed that he would plan without Müller for the foreseeable future, along with his club teammates Jérôme Boateng and Mats Hummels. Müller said after the decision that he was "angry and surprised" why Löw decided to drop him and his Bayern teammates. However, after Löw later admitted in March 2021 that he was considering reversing his decision and allowing the previously barred players to partake in the upcoming UEFA Euro 2020, Müller insisted he was "definitely ready" to return to international duty, stating his desire to win another title with Germany.

=== Return to the national team and UEFA Euro 2020 ===
On 19 May 2021, Müller, along with Hummels, was included in Germany's final 26-man squad for the pan-European UEFA Euro 2020, ending a period of over two years of exclusion from the national team. In the round of 16, Müller missed a one-on-one chance against England when the score was 1–0 for the latter; however, England went on eventually to beat Germany 2–0. Hence, Müller played 15 matches in the European Championship without scoring any goals.

=== 2022 FIFA World Cup ===
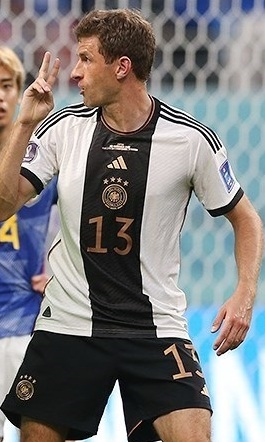
Müller with Germany at the 2022 FIFA World Cup

In November 2022, he was selected in the final squad for the 2022 FIFA World Cup in Qatar. Müller played in all three matches for Germany against Japan, Spain and Costa Rica, but failed to find the net as Germany were eliminated in the group stage for the second time in a row following an upset comeback loss to Japan, a stalemate against Spain, and a 4–2 win against Costa Rica that ultimately proved meaningless.

=== UEFA Euro 2024 and retirement ===
Müller was named in Germany's squad for UEFA Euro 2024 on home soil. In the team's opening match against Scotland on 14 June, he came on as a substitute for Jamal Musiala in the 74th minute and assisted Emre Can's fifth goal of the 5–1 win. He later featured as a substitute in the quarter-finals against Spain, which ended in a 2–1 defeat after extra time.

On 15 July 2024, Müller announced his retirement from international football. He scored 45 goals in 131 international appearances.

== Style of play ==
Müller is a versatile player. In Bayern's youth system, he primarily played as a midfielder, but transitioned to playing as an attacker after joining the first team. When Bayern Munich usually employed a 4–2–3–1 formation, Müller played as one of three attacking midfielders behind the central striker, with an alternative role as a second striker.

His skill set has been described as unorthodox by former Bayern manager Carlo Ancelotti - Müller has never been particularly renowned for his athleticism, technique, ball control, dribbling or pace, qualities typically associated with attackers. Instead, he is widely praised for his tactical intelligence, finishing, and positioning. German editor Uli Hesse of The Guardian wrote of Müller that, though he cannot "beat you" with his close ball control, pace or dribbling skills, "he just beats you". Former Germany manager Joachim Löw said he is "impervious to pressure" and former Bayern manager Louis van Gaal said he has tremendous mental strength. Müller is heavily involved in buildup play and he has been praised by the media for his intelligent movement off the ball; he describes himself as a player who can find spaces in the opposition defence but not particularly good at dribbling or one-on-ones. Müller describes this role as Raumdeuter, a term which translates, literally, to "space interpreter".

During the 2014 FIFA World Cup, Löw said Müller "is a very unorthodox player and you can't really predict his lines of running, but he has one aim and that is 'how can I score a goal?'". In addition to his offensive capabilities, Müller has also been praised by pundits for his stamina and defensive work-rate. Former Bayern assistant coach Hermann Gerland gave him the nickname Radio Müller for his loud and frequent comments on the pitch and in the dressing room.

== Personal life ==
Müller was born in Weilheim in Oberbayern, Bavaria. He was raised in the nearby village of Pähl, which became the centre of media attention during his 2010 FIFA World Cup campaign. His parents are Klaudia and Gerhard, and he has a brother, Simon, who is two and a half years younger.

Müller married his long-time girlfriend Lisa Trede, a semi-professional equestrienne who works on a farm, in December 2009 after being engaged for two years. In June 2026, Müller and his wife Lisa announced their separation.

In June 2011, he became an ambassador for YoungWings, a charity that helps children who have suffered bereavement or trauma. In August 2026, Müller became an investor and shareholder in the German investment group that acquired 90% of Portuguese club Estrela da Amadora for €40 million, alongside Mats Hummels, Yann Sommer and Lucas Hernandez.

== Career statistics ==
=== Club ===
As of match played 7 November 2026

Appearances and goals by club, season and competition
Club	Season	League			National cup (Note: Includes DFB-Pokal, Canadian Championship)		Continental		Other		Total	
Club	Season	Division	Apps	Goals	Apps	Goals	Apps	Goals	Apps	Goals	Apps	Goals
Bayern Munich II	2007–08	Regionalliga Süd	3	1	—		—		—		3	1
Bayern Munich II	2008–09	3. Liga	32	15	—		—		—		32	15
Bayern Munich II	Total		35	16	—		—		—		35	16
Bayern Munich	2008–09	Bundesliga	4	0	0	0	1 (Note: Appearance(s) in UEFA Champions League)	1	—		5	1
Bayern Munich	2009–10	Bundesliga	34	13	6	4	12	2	—		52	19
Bayern Munich	2010–11	Bundesliga	34	12	5	3	8	3	1 (Note: Appearance in DFL-Supercup)	1	48	19
Bayern Munich	2011–12	Bundesliga	34	7	5	2	14	2	—		53	11
Bayern Munich	2012–13	Bundesliga	28	13	5	1	13	8	1	1	47	23
Bayern Munich	2013–14	Bundesliga	31	13	5	8	12	5	3 (Note: One appearance in DFL-Supercup, one appearance in UEFA Super Cup, one appearance in FIFA Club World Cup)	0	51	26
Bayern Munich	2014–15	Bundesliga	32	13	5	1	10	7	1	0	48	21
Bayern Munich	2015–16	Bundesliga	31	20	5	4	12	8	1	0	49	32
Bayern Munich	2016–17	Bundesliga	29	5	3	0	9	3	1	1	42	9
Bayern Munich	2017–18	Bundesliga	29	8	5	4	10	3	1	0	45	15
Bayern Munich	2018–19	Bundesliga	32	6	6	3	6	0	1	0	45	9
Bayern Munich	2019–20	Bundesliga	33	8	6	2	10	4	1	0	50	14
Bayern Munich	2020–21	Bundesliga	32	11	2	1	9	2	3 (Note: One appearance and one goal in DFL-Supercup, one appearance in UEFA Super Cup, one appearance in FIFA Club World Cup)	1	46	15
Bayern Munich	2021–22	Bundesliga	32	8	2	0	10	4	1	1	45	13
Bayern Munich	2022–23	Bundesliga	27	7	4	0	8	1	1	0	40	8
Bayern Munich	2023–24	Bundesliga	31	5	1	1	9	1	0	0	41	7
Bayern Munich	2024–25	Bundesliga	30	1	2	2	12	3	5 (Note: Appearances in FIFA Club World Cup)	2	49	8
Bayern Munich	Total		503	150	67	36	165	57	21	7	756	250
Vancouver Whitecaps FC	2025	MLS	7	7	1	1	—		5 (Note: Appearances in MLS Cup playoffs)	1	13	9
Vancouver Whitecaps FC	2026	MLS	25	9	4	1	4 (Note: Appearances in CONCACAF Champions Cup)	0	2 (Note: Appearances in Leagues Cup)	0	35	10
Vancouver Whitecaps FC	Total		32	16	5	2	4	0	7	1	48	19
Career total			570	182	72	38	169	57	28	8	839	285

=== International ===
Appearances and goals by national team and year
National team	Year	Apps	Goals
Germany
Germany	2010	12	5
Germany	2011	13	5
Germany	2012	13	0
Germany	2013	9	6
Germany	2014	15	10
Germany	2015	6	5
Germany	2016	15	5
Germany	2017	6	1
Germany	2018	11	1
Germany	2019	0	0
Germany	2020	0	0
Germany	2021	10	4
Germany	2022	11	2
Germany	2023	5	1
Germany	2024	5	0
Total		131	45

Scores and results list Germany's goal tally first.

List of international goals scored by Thomas Müller
No.	Date	Venue	Opponent	Score	Result	Competition
1	13 June 2010	Moses Mabhida Stadium, Durban, South Africa	Australia	3–0	4–0	2010 FIFA World Cup
2	27 June 2010	Free State Stadium, Bloemfontein, South Africa	England	3–1	4–1	2010 FIFA World Cup
3	27 June 2010	Free State Stadium, Bloemfontein, South Africa	England	4–1	4–1	2010 FIFA World Cup
4	3 July 2010	Cape Town Stadium, Cape Town, South Africa	Argentina	1–0	4–0	2010 FIFA World Cup
5	10 July 2010	Nelson Mandela Bay Stadium, Port Elizabeth, South Africa	Uruguay	1–0	3–2	2010 FIFA World Cup
6	26 March 2011	Fritz-Walter-Stadion, Kaiserslautern, Germany	Kazakhstan	2–0	4–0	UEFA Euro 2012 qualification
7	26 March 2011	Fritz-Walter-Stadion, Kaiserslautern, Germany	Kazakhstan	3–0	4–0	UEFA Euro 2012 qualification
8	7 October 2011	Türk Telekom Stadium, Istanbul, Turkey	Turkey	2–0	3–1	UEFA Euro 2012 qualification
9	11 November 2011	Olimpiyskiy National Sports Complex, Kyiv, Ukraine	Ukraine	3–3	3–3	Friendly
10	15 November 2011	Volksparkstadion, Hamburg, Germany	Netherlands	1–0	3–0	Friendly
11	6 February 2013	Stade de France, Saint-Denis, France	France	1–1	2–1	Friendly
12	22 March 2013	Astana Arena, Astana, Kazakhstan	Kazakhstan	1–0	3–0	2014 FIFA World Cup qualification
13	22 March 2013	Astana Arena, Astana, Kazakhstan	Kazakhstan	3–0	3–0	2014 FIFA World Cup qualification
14	14 August 2013	Fritz-Walter-Stadion, Kaiserslautern, Germany	Paraguay	2–2	3–3	Friendly
15	6 September 2013	Allianz Arena, Munich, Germany	Austria	3–0	3–0	2014 FIFA World Cup qualification
16	10 September 2013	Tórsvøllur, Tórshavn, Faroe Islands	Faroe Islands	3–0	3–0	2014 FIFA World Cup qualification
17	1 June 2014	Borussia-Park, Mönchengladbach, Germany	Cameroon	1–1	2–2	Friendly
18	16 June 2014	Itaipava Arena Fonte Nova, Salvador, Brazil	Portugal	1–0	4–0	2014 FIFA World Cup
19	16 June 2014	Itaipava Arena Fonte Nova, Salvador, Brazil	Portugal	3–0	4–0	2014 FIFA World Cup
20	16 June 2014	Itaipava Arena Fonte Nova, Salvador, Brazil	Portugal	4–0	4–0	2014 FIFA World Cup
21	26 June 2014	Itaipava Arena Pernambuco, Recife, Brazil	United States	1–0	1–0	2014 FIFA World Cup
22	8 July 2014	Mineirão, Belo Horizonte, Brazil	Brazil	1–0	7–1	2014 FIFA World Cup
23	7 September 2014	Westfalenstadion, Dortmund, Germany	Scotland	1–0	2–1	UEFA Euro 2016 qualification
24	7 September 2014	Westfalenstadion, Dortmund, Germany	Scotland	2–1	2–1	UEFA Euro 2016 qualification
25	14 November 2014	Stadion Nürnberg, Nuremberg, Germany	Gibraltar	1–0	4–0	UEFA Euro 2016 qualification
26	14 November 2014	Stadion Nürnberg, Nuremberg, Germany	Gibraltar	2–0	4–0	UEFA Euro 2016 qualification
27	29 March 2015	Boris Paichadze Dinamo Arena, Tbilisi, Georgia	Georgia	2–0	2–0	UEFA Euro 2016 qualification
28	4 September 2015	Waldstadion, Frankfurt, Germany	Poland	1–0	3–1	UEFA Euro 2016 qualification
29	7 September 2015	Hampden Park, Glasgow, Scotland	Scotland	1–0	3–2	UEFA Euro 2016 qualification
30	7 September 2015	Hampden Park, Glasgow, Scotland	Scotland	2–1	3–2	UEFA Euro 2016 qualification
31	11 October 2015	Red Bull Arena, Leipzig, Germany	Georgia	1–0	2–1	UEFA Euro 2016 qualification
32	4 June 2016	Arena AufSchalke, Gelsenkirchen, Germany	Hungary	2–0	2–0	Friendly
33	4 September 2016	Ullevaal Stadion, Oslo, Norway	Norway	1–0	3–0	2018 FIFA World Cup qualification
34	4 September 2016	Ullevaal Stadion, Oslo, Norway	Norway	3–0	3–0	2018 FIFA World Cup qualification
35	8 October 2016	Volksparkstadion, Hamburg, Germany	Czech Republic	1–0	3–0	2018 FIFA World Cup qualification
36	8 October 2016	Volksparkstadion, Hamburg, Germany	Czech Republic	3–0	3–0	2018 FIFA World Cup qualification
37	26 March 2017	Tofiq Bahramov Republican Stadium, Baku, Azerbaijan	Azerbaijan	2–1	4–1	2018 FIFA World Cup qualification
38	23 March 2018	Merkur Spiel-Arena, (Note: The stadium was known as Esprit Arena in 2018.) Düsseldorf, Germany	Spain	1–1	1–1	Friendly
39	7 June 2021	Merkur Spiel-Arena, Düsseldorf, Germany	Latvia	3–0	7–1	Friendly
40	8 October 2021	Volksparkstadion, Hamburg, Germany	Romania	2–1	2–1	2022 FIFA World Cup qualification
41	11 November 2021	Volkswagen Arena, Wolfsburg, Germany	Liechtenstein	6–0	9–0	2022 FIFA World Cup qualification
42	11 November 2021	Volkswagen Arena, Wolfsburg, Germany	Liechtenstein	8–0	9–0	2022 FIFA World Cup qualification
43	29 March 2022	Johan Cruyff Arena, Amsterdam, Netherlands	Netherlands	1–0	1–1	Friendly
44	14 June 2022	Borussia-Park, Mönchengladbach, Germany	Italy	3–0	5–2	2022–23 UEFA Nations League A
45	12 September 2023	Westfalenstadion, Dortmund, Germany	France	1–0	2–1	Friendly

== Honours ==
Bayern Munich

- Bundesliga: 2009–10, 2012–13, 2013–14, 2014–15, 2015–16, 2016–17, 2017–18, 2018–19, 2019–20, 2020–21, 2021–22, 2022–23, 2024–25
- DFB-Pokal: 2009–10, 2012–13, 2013–14, 2015–16, 2018–19, 2019–20; runner-up: 2011–12, 2017–18
- DFL-Supercup: 2010, 2012, 2016, 2017, 2018, 2020, 2021, 2022
- UEFA Champions League: 2012–13, 2019–20; runner-up: 2009–10, 2011–12
- UEFA Super Cup: 2013, 2020
- FIFA Club World Cup: 2013, 2020

Vancouver Whitecaps

- Canadian Championship: 2025
- MLS Cup runner-up: 2025

Germany

- FIFA World Cup: 2014; third place: 2010
- UEFA European Championship third place: 2012

Individual

- FIFA World Cup Golden Boot: 2010
- FIFA World Cup Best Young Player: 2010
- FIFA World Cup All-Star Team: 2010
- FIFA World Cup Silver Boot: 2014
- FIFA World Cup Silver Ball: 2014
- FIFA World Cup All-Star Team: 2014
- FIFA World Cup Dream Team: 2014
- World Soccer Young Player of the Year: 2010
- Bravo Award: 2010
- VDV Bundesliga Newcomer of the Season: 2010
- DFB-Pokal top scorer: 2010, 2014
- Bavarian Order of Merit: 2019
- UEFA Super Cup Man of the Match: 2020
- UEFA Champions League Squad of the Season: 2019–20
- Bundesliga Team of the Season: 2017–18, 2019–20, 2020–21
- Bundesliga Player of the Month: January 2022
- Bundesliga Goal of the Month: August 2024
- VDV Bundesliga Team of the Season: 2009–10, 2015–16, 2017–18, 2020–21
- kicker Bundesliga Team of the Season: 2012–13, 2015–16, 2019–20, 2020–21
- Bayern Munich Player of the Season: 2021–22
- MLS All-Star: 2026

=== Orders ===
- Silbernes Lorbeerblatt: 2010, 2014
- Bavarian Order of Merit: 2019

== See also ==
- List of UEFA Champions League top scorers
- List of footballers with 100 or more UEFA Champions League appearances
- List of men's footballers with 100 or more international caps
