= 2013 DFL-Supercup =

- Match programme cover
- Event: DFL-Supercup
Borussia Dortmund	Bayern Munich
4	2
- Date: 27 July 2013
- Venue: Signal Iduna Park, Dortmund
- Referee: Jochen Drees (Münster-Sarmsheim)
- Attendance: 80,645

The 2013 DFL-Supercup was the fourth DFL-Supercup, an annual football match contested by the winners of the previous season's Bundesliga and DFB-Pokal competitions. It featured Bayern Munich, winners of the 2012–13 Bundesliga and the 2012–13 DFB-Pokal, and, as a result of the former winning both competitions, the Bundesliga runners-up Borussia Dortmund. The match was hosted by Dortmund at the Signal Iduna Park on 27 July 2013. The match took place two months after the same teams played each other in the 2013 UEFA Champions League final.

Borussia Dortmund won the match 4–2. It was their fourth triumph in the Supercup, which equalled the then-record held by Bayern Munich.

== Teams ==
In the following table, matches until 1996 were in the DFB-Supercup era, since 2010 were in the DFL-Supercup era.

Team	Qualification	Previous appearances (bold indicates winners)
Borussia Dortmund	2012–13 Bundesliga runners-up	5 (**1989**, **1995**, **1996**, 2011, 2012) (Note: Winners of the unofficial 2008 German Supercup. One-time runners-up in the DFL-Ligapokal.)
Bayern Munich^{TH}	2012–13 Bundesliga champions and 2012–13 DFB-Pokal winners	6 (**1987**, 1989, **1990**, 1994, **2010**, **2012**) (Note: Runners-up in the unofficial 2008 German Supercup. Six-time winners and one-time runners-up in the DFL-Ligapokal.)

== Match ==
=== Details ===
27 July 2013
20:30 CEST

Borussia Dortmund	4–2	Bayern Munich
Reus 6', 86'; Van Buyten 56' (o.g.); Gündoğan 57'	Report	Robben 54', 64'

Signal Iduna Park, Dortmund
Attendance: 80,645
Referee: Jochen Drees (Münster-Sarmsheim)

**Borussia Dortmund**	**Bayern Munich**

GK	1	(Germany) Roman Weidenfeller (c)
RB	19	(Germany) Kevin Großkreutz
CB	4	(Serbia) Neven Subotić
CB	15	(Germany) Mats Hummels
LB	26	(Germany) Marcel Schmelzer
CM	18	(Turkey) Nuri Şahin
CM	6	(Germany) Sven Bender	(substituted off) 46'
RW	16	(Poland) Jakub Błaszczykowski	(substituted off) 72'
AM	8	(Germany) İlkay Gündoğan	(substituted off) 88'
LW	11	(Germany) Marco Reus
CF	9	(Poland) Robert Lewandowski
Substitutes:
GK	20	(Australia) Mitchell Langerak
DF	25	(Greece) Sokratis Papastathopoulos	(substituted on) 88'
DF	37	(Germany) Erik Durm
MF	5	(Germany) Sebastian Kehl	(substituted on) 46'
MF	7	(Germany) Jonas Hofmann
FW	17	(Gabon) Pierre-Emerick Aubameyang	(substituted on) 72'
FW	23	(Germany) Julian Schieber
Manager:
(Germany) Jürgen Klopp

GK	22	(Germany) Tom Starke
RB	21	(Germany) Philipp Lahm (c)
CB	5	(Belgium) Daniel Van Buyten
CB	17	(Germany) Jérôme Boateng	(yellow card) 90+1'
LB	27	(Austria) David Alaba
DM	6	(Spain) Thiago
AM	25	(Germany) Thomas Müller
AM	39	(Germany) Toni Kroos		(substituted off) 86'
RW	10	(Netherlands) Arjen Robben
CF	9	(Croatia) Mario Mandžukić		(substituted off) 75'
LW	11	(Switzerland) Xherdan Shaqiri		(substituted off) 67'
Substitutes:
GK	32	(Germany) Lukas Raeder
DF	4	(Brazil) Dante		(substituted on) 86'
DF	13	(Brazil) Rafinha
DF	26	(Germany) Diego Contento
MF	30	(Brazil) Luiz Gustavo
MF	31	(Germany) Bastian Schweinsteiger		(substituted on) 67'
FW	14	(Peru) Claudio Pizarro		(substituted on) 75'
Manager:
(Spain) Pep Guardiola

Assistant referees:
Tobias Christ (Münchweiler an der Rodalb)
Christian Gittelmann (Albisheim)
Fourth official:
Guido Kleve (Nordhorn)

== See also ==
- 2013–14 Bundesliga
- 2013–14 DFB-Pokal
