= 2008 German Supercup =

2008 T-Home Supercup
Deutscher Supercup
- Event: German Supercup
Borussia Dortmund	Bayern Munich
2	1
- Date: 23 July 2008
- Venue: Signal Iduna Park, Dortmund
- Referee: Thorsten Kinhöfer (Herne)
- Attendance: 47,100

The 2008 German Supercup, known as the T-Home Supercup for sponsorship reasons, was an unofficial edition of the German Supercup, a football match contested by the winners of the previous season's Bundesliga and DFB-Pokal competitions.

The match was played at the Signal Iduna Park in Dortmund, and contested by 2007–08 Bundesliga and 2007–08 DFB-Pokal winners Bayern Munich, and DFB-Pokal runners-up Borussia Dortmund. Dortmund won the match 2–1 to claim the unofficial title.

== Teams ==
Team	Qualification
Borussia Dortmund	2007–08 DFB-Pokal runners-up
Bayern Munich	2007–08 Bundesliga champions and 2007–08 DFB-Pokal winners

== Match ==
=== Details ===
23 July 2008
20:30 CEST

Borussia Dortmund	2–1	Bayern Munich
Błaszczykowski 29'; Hajnal 33'	Report	Ekici 73'

Signal Iduna Park, Dortmund
Attendance: 47,100
Referee: Thorsten Kinhöfer (Herne)

Borussia Dortmund	Bayern Munich

GK	1	(Germany) Roman Weidenfeller
RB	14	(Serbia) Antonio Rukavina
CB	4	(Serbia) Neven Subotić
CB	15	(Germany) Mats Hummels
LB	17	(Brazil) Dedé
RM	16	(Poland) Jakub Błaszczykowski	(substituted off) 61'
CM	30	(Hungary) Tamás Hajnal	(substituted off) 61'
CM	5	(Germany) Sebastian Kehl (c)
LM	11	(South Africa) Delron Buckley	(substituted off) 46'
CF	9	(Paraguay) Nelson Valdez	(substituted off) 71'
CF	10	(Croatia) Mladen Petrić	(substituted off) 86'
Substitutes:
MF	6	(Germany) Florian Kringe	(substituted on) 46'
MF	8	(Italy) Giovanni Federico	(substituted on) 61'
MF	22	(Germany) Marc-André Kruska	(substituted on) 61'
FW	19	(Argentina) Diego Klimowicz	(substituted on) 71'
FW	34	(Albania) Bajram Sadrijaj	(substituted on) 86'
Manager:
(Germany) Jürgen Klopp

GK	1	(Germany) Michael Rensing
RB	2	(France) Willy Sagnol	(substituted off) 46'
CB	3	(Brazil) Lúcio
CB	6	(Argentina) Martín Demichelis
LB	30	(Germany) Christian Lell
RM	8	(Turkey) Hamit Altıntop	(substituted off) 71'
CM	24	(Germany) Tim Borowski	(substituted off) 46'
CM	17	(Netherlands) Mark van Bommel (c)
LM	31	(Germany) Bastian Schweinsteiger	(substituted off) 46'
CF	9	(Italy) Luca Toni	(substituted off) 46'
CF	18	(Germany) Miroslav Klose	(substituted off) 46'
Substitutes:
GK	35	(Germany) Thomas Kraft
DF	5	(Belgium) Daniel Van Buyten	(substituted on) 46'
MF	13	(Germany) Mehmet Ekici	(substituted on) 71'
MF	16	(Germany) Andreas Ottl	(substituted on) 46'
MF	39	(Germany) Toni Kroos	(substituted on) 46'
FW	11	(Germany) Lukas Podolski	(substituted on) 46'
FW	14	(Zimbabwe) Joseph Ngwenya	(substituted on) 46'
Manager:
(Germany) Jürgen Klinsmann

== See also ==
- 2008–09 Bundesliga
- 2008–09 DFB-Pokal
- Der Klassiker
