= 2012 DFL-Supercup =

3rd DFL-Supercup

- Match programme cover
Bayern Munich	Borussia Dortmund
2	1
- Date: 12 August 2012
- Venue: Allianz Arena, Munich
- Referee: Michael Weiner (Ottenstein)
- Attendance: 69,000
- Weather: Cloudy

The 2012 DFL-Supercup was the third DFL-Supercup, an annual football match contested by the winners of the previous season's Bundesliga and DFB-Pokal competitions. It took place on 12 August 2012 at the Allianz Arena. The match featured Borussia Dortmund, winners of both the 2011–12 Bundesliga and 2011–12 DFB-Pokal, and Bayern Munich, runners-up in both the Bundesliga and DFB-Pokal.

Bayern Munich won the match 2–1 and captured their then-record fourth title.

== Teams ==
In the following table, matches until 1996 were in the DFB-Supercup era, since 2010 were in the DFL-Supercup era.

Team	Qualification	Previous appearances (bold indicates winners)
Bayern Munich	2011–12 Bundesliga runners-up	5 (**1987**, 1989, **1990**, 1994, **2010**) (Note: Runners-up in the unofficial 2008 German Supercup. Six-time winners and one-time runners-up in the DFL-Ligapokal.)
Borussia Dortmund	2011–12 Bundesliga champions and 2011–12 DFB-Pokal winners	4 (**1989**, **1995**, **1996**, 2011) (Note: Winners of the unofficial 2008 German Supercup. One-time runners-up in the DFL-Ligapokal.)

== Match ==
=== Details ===
12 August 2012
20:00 CEST

Bayern Munich	2–1	Borussia Dortmund
Mandžukić 6'; Müller 11'	Report	Lewandowski 75'

Allianz Arena, Munich
Attendance: 69,000
Referee: Michael Weiner (Ottenstein)

**Bayern Munich**	**Borussia Dortmund**

GK	1	(Germany) Manuel Neuer
RB	21	(Germany) Philipp Lahm (c)
CB	17	(Germany) Jérôme Boateng
CB	4	(Brazil) Dante
LB	36	(Germany) Emre Can	(yellow card) 37'	(substituted off) 70'
CM	39	(Germany) Toni Kroos
CM	30	(Brazil) Luiz Gustavo	(yellow card) 28'
RW	10	(Netherlands) Arjen Robben	(yellow card) 82'	(substituted off) 86'
AM	25	(Germany) Thomas Müller
LW	7	(France) Franck Ribéry		(substituted off) 81'
CF	9	(Croatia) Mario Mandžukić	(yellow card) 68'
Substitutions:
GK	22	(Germany) Tom Starke
DF	5	(Belgium) Daniel Van Buyten
DF	28	(Germany) Holger Badstuber		(substituted on) 70'
MF	11	(Switzerland) Xherdan Shaqiri		(substituted on) 86'
MF	23	(Germany) Mitchell Weiser
MF	44	(Ukraine) Anatoliy Tymoshchuk		(substituted on) 81'
FW	14	(Peru) Claudio Pizarro
Manager:
(Germany) Jupp Heynckes

GK	1	(Germany) Roman Weidenfeller (c)
RB	26	(Poland) Łukasz Piszczek
CB	4	(Serbia) Neven Subotić
CB	15	(Germany) Mats Hummels
LB	29	(Germany) Marcel Schmelzer	(yellow card) 42'
CM	8	(Germany) İlkay Gündoğan
CM	7	(Germany) Moritz Leitner		(substituted off) 64'
RW	16	(Poland) Jakub Błaszczykowski		(substituted off) 71'
AM	11	(Germany) Marco Reus
LW	19	(Germany) Kevin Großkreutz		(substituted off) 64'
CF	9	(Poland) Robert Lewandowski
Substitutions:
GK	20	(Australia) Mitchell Langerak
DF	24	(Germany) Chris Löwe
DF	27	(Brazil) Felipe Santana
MF	10	(Germany) Mario Götze		(substituted on) 64'
MF	14	(Croatia) Ivan Perišić		(substituted on) 64'
MF	28	(Australia) Mustafa Amini
FW	23	(Germany) Julian Schieber		(substituted on) 71'
Manager:
(Germany) Jürgen Klopp

Assistant referees:
Norbert Grudzinski
Frank Willenborg
Fourth official:
Thorsten Schriever

== See also ==
- 2012–13 Bundesliga
- 2012–13 DFB-Pokal
