= 2014–15 FC Bayern Munich season =

116th season in existence of Bayern Munich

FC Bayern Munich
2014–15 season
- President: Karl Hopfner
- Sporting director: Matthias Sammer
- Head coach: Pep Guardiola
- Stadium: Allianz Arena
- Bundesliga: 1st
- DFB-Pokal: Semi-finals
- DFL-Supercup: Runners-up
- UEFA Champions League: Semi-finals
- Top goalscorer: League: Robert Lewandowski; Arjen Robben (17 each); All: Robert Lewandowski (25 goals)
- Highest home attendance: 75,000 (Note: Eight Bundesliga matches and two DFB-Pokal matches)
- Lowest home attendance: 68,000 (Note: Three UEFA Champions League group stage matches)
- Average home league attendance: 72,882
- Biggest win: Bayern Munich 8–0 Hamburger SV
- Biggest defeat: Wolfsburg 4–1 Bayern Munich; Barcelona 3–0 Bayern Munich
Home colours	Away colours	Third colours
- All statistics correct as of 12 May 2015.

The 2014–15 FC Bayern Munich season was the 116th season in the club's history and the 50th consecutive season in the top flight of German football, the Bundesliga, since their promotion from the Regionalliga Süd in 1965. Bayern participated in the season's editions of the DFB-Pokal, DFL-Supercup and UEFA Champions League. It was the 10th season for Bayern at the Allianz Arena.

== Background ==
=== Overview ===
==== Context ====
Bayern came into the 2014–15 season as the defending Bundesliga champions and defending DFB-Pokal champions. In the 2013–14 season, Bayern were knocked out of Champions League by eventual winners Real Madrid in the semi-finals, losing 5–0 on aggregate. Bayern hired Michael Reschke as Technical Director. This is a new position and will provide "support" for Matthias Sammer, the Sporting Director for Bayern.

==== Transfers ====
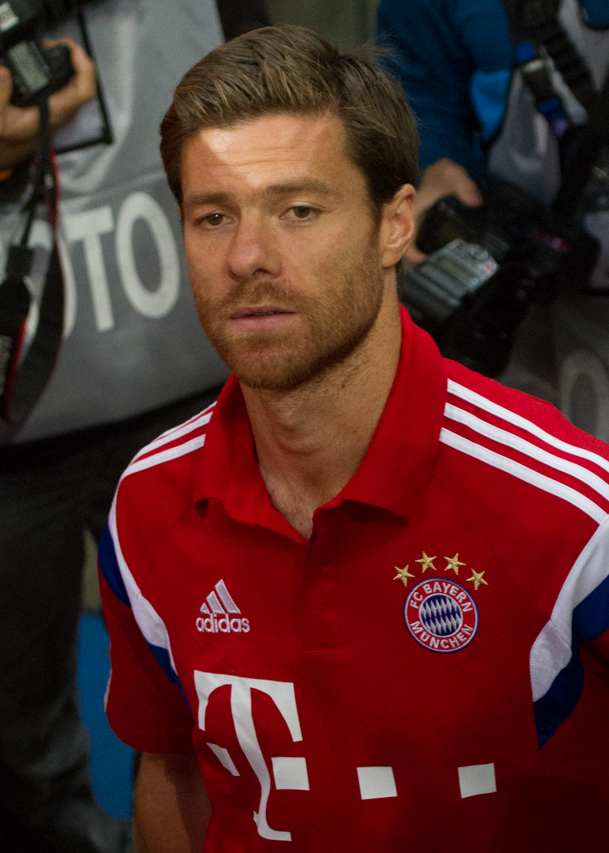
Xabi Alonso joined Bayern in August 2014

Robert Lewandowski, Sebastian Rode, Juan Bernat, Pepe Reina, Medhi Benatia, Xabi Alonso, and Sinan Kurt transferred to Bayern. Lewandowski was the second "key" player within a year to move to Bayern from Borussia Dortmund. Bayern bought Medhi Benatia from Roma for an undisclosed fee. Pep Guardiola wanted to sign another player due to Javi Martínez's injury in the German Super Cup. For this reason, Bayern brought Xabi Alonso from Real Madrid for undisclosed fee. Lukas Raeder, Alessandro Schöpf, Mario Mandžukić, Toni Kroos, and Diego Contento left the club. Contento had been at the club for 19 years. Mandžukić wanted to leave Bayern because the "playing style of coach Pep Guardiola simply does not fit him." Julian Green was loaned out to Hamburger SV and Daniel Van Buyten retired. He had been offered another role at Bayern.

==== Pre-season ====
Pre-season started on 9 July. During pre-season, Bayern defeated Red Baroons Dietmannsried 3–0 on 18 July in its first friendly match of the season. This was Holger Badstuber's first match in 594 days. Badstuber injured his ACL against Borussia Dortmund on 1 December 2012. and re-injured it on 19 May 2013. He returned to first-team training on 5 May 2014. Also in pre-season, Bayern faced MSV Duisburg on 21 July in a benefits match which ended in a 1–1 draw. Robert Lewandowski made his pre-season debut and scored his first goal for Bayern. Pre-season continued with the 2014 Telekom Cup. Bayern faced Borussia Mönchengladbach in the semifinal on 26 July which Bayern won in a shoot-out, after a 2–2 draw in sixty minutes. Bayern defeated VfL Wolfsburg 3–0 in the final the following day and won the cup. Bayern took a tour of the United States. This is Bayern's first pre-season tour in the United States in a decade. Bayern were in New York City for three days. During the tour, on 31 July, they defeated Chivas Guadalajara 1–0 at Red Bull Arena in Harrison, New Jersey and won the Audi Football Summit Cup 2014. Bayern were also in Portland, Oregon for four days. While in Portland, on 6 August, Bayern lost to the MLS All-Star team 2–1 on 6 August. Pep Guardiola was angry because of "harsh challenges" and didn't shake Caleb Porter's hand after the game. Two of the tackles came from Osvaldo Alonso and other tackle came from Will Johnson. The tackle by Johnson injured Bastian Schweinsteiger. During pre-season, Thiago "suffered a relapse" of his knee injury that he picked up in March 2014.

==== Mid-season ====
Prior to the winter break, Bayern signed Tom Starke to a contract extension and gave Gianluca Gaudino his first professional contract. Bayern defeated Mainz 05 and immediately went on winter break. During the winter break, Bayern signed Joshua Kimmich as their first transfer signing for the 2015–16 season. Most of the players returned on 7 January. David Alaba, Holger Badstuber, Pierre-Emile Højbjerg, Medhi Benatia, and Tom Starke had returned earlier. Bayern loaned out Højbjerg for the remainder of the season and sold Xherdan Shaqiri. Højbjerg also received a contract extension. Bayern left for a nine-day training camp in Doha, Qatar on 9 January. Philipp Lahm and Thiago didn't go to Doha, Qatar. While in the Middle East, Bayern played two friendlies. In the first match in Qatar, Bayern defeated the Qatar Stars League XI 4–1. In the second match in Riyadh, Saudi Arabia, Bayern defeated Al-Hilal 4–1. Bayern finished mid-season training with a 5–1 win against VfL Bochum on 23 January. On 13 January, Allianz Arena increased capacity to 75,000 after the city of Munich approved the increase which is for Bundesliga matches only. The capacity for UEFA Champions League matches also increased.

=== Transfers and contracts ===
==== In ====
No.	Pos.	Name	Age	EU	Moved from	Type	Transfer window	Contract ends	Transfer fee	Ref.
9	FW	(Poland) Robert Lewandowski	25	Yes	(Germany) Borussia Dortmund	End of contract	Summer	2019	Free	
20	MF	(Germany) Sebastian Rode	23	Yes	(Germany) Eintracht Frankfurt	End of contract	Summer	2018	Free	
18	DF	(Spain) Juan Bernat	21	Yes	(Spain) Valencia	Transfer	Summer	2019	Undisclosed	
23	GK	(Spain) Pepe Reina	31	Yes	(England) Liverpool	Transfer	Summer	2017	Undisclosed	
5	DF	(Morocco) Medhi Benatia	27	Yes	(Italy) Roma	Transfer	Summer	2019	Undisclosed	
3	MF	(Spain) Xabi Alonso	32	Yes	(Spain) Real Madrid	Transfer	Summer	2016	Undisclosed	
24	FW	(Germany) Sinan Kurt	17	Yes	(Germany) Borussia Mönchengladbach	Transfer	Summer	2018	Undisclosed	

==== Out ====
No.	Pos.	Name	Age	EU	Moved to	Type	Transfer window	Transfer fee	Ref.
5	DF	(Belgium) Daniel Van Buyten	36	Yes	Retired	End of contract	Summer	Free	
32	GK	(Germany) Lukas Raeder	20	Yes	(Portugal) Vitória Setúbal	End of contract	Summer	Free	
34	MF	(Austria) Alessandro Schöpf	20	Yes	(Germany) 1. FC Nürnberg	Transfer	Summer	Undisclosed	
9	FW	(Croatia) Mario Mandžukić	28	Yes	(Spain) Atlético Madrid	Transfer	Summer	Undisclosed	
39	MF	(Germany) Toni Kroos	24	Yes	(Spain) Real Madrid	Transfer	Summer	Undisclosed	
26	DF	(Germany) Diego Contento	24	Yes	(France) Girondins de Bordeaux	Transfer	Summer	Undisclosed	
37	MF	(United States) Julian Green	19	Yes	(Germany) Hamburger SV	Loan	Summer	Undisclosed	
34	MF	(Denmark) Pierre-Emile Højbjerg	19	Yes	(Germany) FC Augsburg	Loan	January	Undisclosed	
11	MF	(Switzerland) Xherdan Shaqiri	23	No	(Italy) Inter Milan	Transfer	January	Undisclosed	

==== Contracts ====
No.	Pos.	Name	Age	EU	Status	Contract length	Expiry date	Other details	Ref.
18	DF	(Spain) Juan Bernat	21	Yes	Transfer	Five years	30 June 2019		
23	GK	(Spain) Pepe Reina	31	Yes	Transfer	Three years	30 June 2017		
5	DF	(Morocco) Medhi Benatia	27	No	Transfer	Five years	30 June 2019		
3	MF	(Spain) Xabi Alonso	32	Yes	Transfer	Two years	30 June 2016		
24	FW	(Germany) Sinan Kurt	17	Yes	Transfer	Four years	30 June 2018		
16	MF	(Germany) Gianluca Gaudino	18	Yes	First pro contract	Four years	30 June 2018		
22	GK	(Germany) Tom Starke	33	Yes	Extension	One year	30 June 2016		
—	MF	(Germany) Joshua Kimmich	19	Yes	Signing	Five years	30 June 2020	Signed for the 2015–16 season.	
34	MF	(Denmark) Pierre-Emile Højbjerg	19	Yes	Extension	Three years	30 June 2018		

=== Friendly results ===
Win Draw Loss

Match	Date Kick-off (Note: Times up until 25 October 2014 are in CEST (UTC+02:00). Times from 26 October 2014 to 28 March 2015 are in CET (UTC+01:00). Times on and after 29 March 2015 are in CEST (UTC+02:00).)	H/A/N	Opponent	Res. F–A	Att.	Goalscorers and disciplined players		Ref.
Match	Date Kick-off	H/A/N	Opponent	Res. F–A	Att.	Bayern Munich	Opponent	Ref.
Dream Game	18 July; 18:00	N	Red Baroons Dietmannsried	3–0	11,150	Alaba 5', 37'; Hägler 14'	—	
Friendly	21 July; 18:30	A	MSV Duisburg	1–1	24,126	Lewandowski 62'; Steinhart (yellow card) 80'	Schnellhardt 69'	
Telekom Cup 2014 Semifinals	26 July; 20:30	N	Borussia Mönchengladbach	2–2 (5–4 p)	42,000	Lewandowski 29'; Ribéry 34'	Kruse 42' (pen.), 60' (pen.)	
Telekom Cup 2014 Semifinals	26 July; 20:30	N	Borussia Mönchengladbach	2–2 (5–4 p)	42,000	Penalties		
Telekom Cup 2014 Semifinals	26 July; 20:30	N	Borussia Mönchengladbach	2–2 (5–4 p)	42,000	Lewandowski (penalty scored); Alaba (penalty scored); Badstuber (penalty scored); Rafinha (penalty missed); Højbjerg (penalty scored); Martínez (penalty scored)	(penalty scored) Nordtveit; (penalty scored) Raffael; (penalty scored) Hahn; (penalty scored) Kruse; (penalty missed) Wendt; (penalty missed) Korb	
Telekom Cup 2014 Final	27 July; 18:15	N	VfL Wolfsburg	3–0	50,000	Lewandowski 4', 20'; Rode 15'	—	
Audi Football Summit	1 August; 02:00	N	Guadalajara	1–0	25,073	Pizarro 10'; Martínez (yellow card) 28'; Rafinha (yellow card) 87'	Pereira (yellow card) 22'; Sánchez (yellow card) 73'; Solís (yellow card) 84'	
2014 MLS All-Star Game	7 August; 03:55	A	MLS All-Stars	1–2	21,733	Lewandowski 8'; Boateng (yellow card) 90+2'	Wright-Phillips 51'; Alonso (yellow card) 64'; Donovan 70'; Johnson (yellow card) 89'	
Paulaner Cup	6 October; 17:30	N	Paulaner Dream Team	5–1	—	Müller 36'; Pantovic 69'; Eberwein 75', 79'; Alonso 85'	Prünstner 71'	
Friendly	13 January; 18:05	A	Qatar Stars League XI	4–1	6,838	Weiser 4', 14'; Ribéry 43'; Pizarro 90+1'	Harbaoui 26', (yellow card) 45+2'	
Friendly	17 January; 18:00	A	Al-Hilal	4–1	—	Dante 9'; Schweinsteiger 11'; Lewandowski 39'; Pizarro 62'; Weiser (yellow card) 90+2'	Digão (yellow card) 57'; Al-Dawsari 90'	
Friendly	23 January; 18:00	A	VfL Bochum	5–1	29,299	Robben 26', 78'; Dante 43'; Götze 66'; Rode 84'	Latza 5'	

== Bundesliga ==
=== Bundesliga review ===
==== August ====
Bayern defeated VfL Wolfsburg 2–1 on 22 August in the opening match of the Bundesliga season. Thomas Müller and Arjen Robben scored for Bayern and Ivica Olić scored for Wolfsburg. Junior Malanda failed to convert an opportunity that would have equalised for Wolfsburg. The original shot came off Manuel Neuer then off the crossbar. Then after the ball hit the crossbar, Malanda missed from a yard out. Bayern had chances to score more goals. Sebastian Rode had a goal wrongly ruled out after the assistant referee flagged for offside and Arjen Robben hit the crossbar. Bastian Schweinsteiger, Rafinha, Thiago, Franck Ribéry, and Javi Martínez were out injured. Jérôme Boateng finished his two-match suspension which he received during the 2013–14 season. Robert Lewandowski, Juan Bernat made their league debuts for Bayern. Jérôme Boateng finished his two-match suspension which he received during the 2013–14 season. 17 year-old Gianluca Gaudino made his first Bundesliga appearance of his career and 18-year-old Lucas Scholl was on the bench for the first team for the first time. Bayern finished the matchday tied for third with Hannover 96. Then, on matchday two on 30 August, Bayern finished August with a 1–1 draw against Schalke 04 on 30 August. Robert Lewandowski scored for Bayern and Benedikt Höwedes scored for Schalke 04. Lewandowski's goal was his first competitive goal for Bayern. Bayern disputed Höwedes' goal after it came off his arm. Bayern managed 10 shots on target, which was the worst total for Bayern since Pep Guardiola took over as head coach. This was Schalke 04's first point against Bayern since 10 December 2010. Xabi Alonso made his debut. Bayern finished the matchday tied for fifth with Eintracht Frankfurt.

==== September ====
Bayern started September with a 2–0 win against VfB Stuttgart on matchday three on 13 September. Mario Götze and Franck Ribéry scored for Bayern. Holger Badstuber left the match with a thigh injury. Bayern finished the matchday in second place. Then, on matchday four on 20 September, the match against Hamburger SV finished in a 0–0 draw. Guardiola decided to rotate players from their midweek Champions League match. Thomas Müller was on the substitutes bench, however, he replaced Arjen Robben in starting line-up after Robben was injured during the warm-up. Bayern finished the matchday in fourth place. On matchday five, on 23 September, Bayern defeated Paderborn 07 4–0 with two goals from Mario Götze and a goal each from Robert Lewandowski and Thomas Müller. Bayern finished the matchday in first place. On matchday six, on 27 September, Bayern defeated 1. FC Köln 2–0 with a goal from Mario Götze and an own goal from Daniel Halfar. Bayern were denied a penalty shot, again, after Arjen Robben went down. Xabi Alonso broke the record for having the most touches on the ball in a single match. Bayern finished the matchday in first place.

==== October ====
Bayern started October with a 4–0 win against Hannover 96 on matchday seven on 4 October. Both Robert Lewandowski and Arjen Robben scored two goals each. Xabi Alonso took a shot from just inside his own half, which was subsequently tipped over the crossbar. With the win, Bayern got their 23rd win in 26 matches in Munich against Hannover. Bayern finished the matchday in first place. Bayern then defeated Werder Bremen 6–0 on matchday eight on 18 October with two goals from Philipp Lahm, two goals from Mario Götze, and a goal each from Xabi Alonso and Thomas Müller. Alonso's goal was his first goal since transferring to Bayern. Bayern finished the matchday in first place. Then on 26 October, on matchday nine, Borussia Mönchengladbach ended Bayern's six-match winning streak in all competitions with a 0–0 draw. Bayern had a chance to win four consecutive league matches for the first time in 47 years. Borussia Mönchengladbach's tactics against Bayern was to crowd the penalty area and play counterattacking football. Yann Sommer made a fingertip save from a David Alaba shot that hit the post. Arjen Robben was injured for the match. Bayern finished the matchday in first place.

==== November ====
Bayern started November with a 2–1 win against Borussia Dortmund, on matchday 10, 1 November. Robert Lewandowski and Arjen Robben scored for Bayern and Marco Reus for Borussia Dortmund. A Marco Reus header gave Dortmund the lead in the 31st minute. In the second half, Neven Subotić stopped a through-ball from Franck Ribéry to Robben. However, the ball went to Lewandowski who scored the equaliser. Robben scored the winning goal from the penalty spot after Subotić fouled Ribéry. Dortmund goalkeeper Roman Weidenfeller made several saves during the match. Bayern finished the matchday in first place and maintained their four-point lead. Then on 8 November, on matchday 11, Bayern defeated Eintracht Frankfurt 4–0 with three goals from Thomas Müller and a goal from Xherdan Shaqiri. Müller opened the scoring in the 23rd minute. Müller hit the back of the net three minutes later, however, the referee called offside on the play. Then he got his second goal in the 64th minute and completed his hattrick in the 67th minute. This was Müller's second hattrick of his career. Xherdan Shaqiri then scored in the 86th minute. Bayern finished the matchday in first place. Then on 22 November, on matchday 12, Bayern defeated 1899 Hoffenheim 4–0 with goals from Mario Götze, Robert Lewandowski, Arjen Robben, and Sebastian Rode. Götze opened the scoring in the 23rd minute. Then five minutes before half-time, Lewandowski put Bayern up 2–0. Robben put Bayern up 3–0 in the 83rd minute. Four minutes later, Rode scored to put Bayern up 4–0. Bastian Schweinsteiger made his first competitive match of the season when he came on as a substitute in the 78th minute 1899 Hoffenheim player Ádám Szalai was sent-off in the 90th minute for a foul on Dante. Bayern finished the matchday in first place. Bayern extended their lead to seven points after Wolfsburg lost to Schalke 04. On matchday 13, on 29 November, Bayern defeated Hertha BSC 1–0 by a first-half goal from Arjen Robben. Franck Ribéry tied Matthieu Delpierre record for most appearances for a French player. With the clean sheet, Bayern tied VfB Stuttgart's record of only three goals conceded in the opening 13 Bundesliga matches. Bayern finished the matchday in first place.

==== December ====
To start December, Bayern defeated Bayer Leverkusen 1–0 with Franck Ribéry's 100th goal for Bayern. on matchday 14, on 6 December. The goal came in the 51st minute. Bayern had chances to score more goals after taking the lead, by failed to convert any of those chances. Bayern finished the match in first place, seven points over second place Wolfsburg. Then on 13 December, on matchday 15, Bayern defeated FC Augsburg 4–0 with two goals from Arjen Robben and a goal each from Medhi Benatia and Robert Lewandowski. Benatia opened the scoring in the 58th minute. Then a minute later, Robben scored his first goal of the match. Lewandowski's goal came in the 68th minute before Robben got his second goal of the match three minutes later. Manuel Neuer had touched the ball 64 times during the match and won a free kick "well outside of the box against Tobias Werner." Bayern finished the matchday in first place. On 16 December, on matchday 16, Bayern defeated SC Freiburg 2–0 with goals from Arjen Robben and Thomas Müller. Robben scored in the 41st minute and Müller scored in the 48th minute. Robben scored his 100th competitive goal for Bayern. Bayern had a season record 81% possession. Bayern finished the matchday in first place. On matchday 17, on 19 December, Bayern defeated 1. FSV Mainz 05 2–1. Elkin Soto opened the scoring in the 21st minute. However, three minutes later, Bastian Schweinsteiger scored the equaliser from a free kick. Then Arjen Robben scored the winning goal with 30 seconds of normal time remaining. Bayern finished the matchday in first place and the first half of the season undefeated.

==== January–February ====
On matchday 18, on 30 January, Bayern lost their first match of the Bundesliga season and their first league match in 293 days after losing 4–1 to Wolfsburg. Bayern had only given up four league goals all season and was the first league match where Bayern gave up four goals since 4 April 2009 when they lost to Wolfsburg 5–1. Bas Dost and Kevin De Bruyne each scored two goals for Wolfsburg and Juan Bernat scored for Bayern. Dost gave Wolfsburg a 1–0 league in the fourth minute and added a second in stoppage time in the first half. Dost became the first player in 102 league matches to score two goals against Bayern. De Bruyne added a third for Wolfsburg in the 53rd minute before Bernat scored two minutes later to give Bayern their only goal of the match. De Bruyne scored his second goal of the match to put Wolfsburg up 4–1. Bayern finished the matchday in first place. On matchday 19, on 3 February, Bayern and Schalke 04 finished their match in a 1–1 draw. Arjen Robben opened the scoring in the 67th minute for Bayern and Benedikt Höwedes equalised in the 72nd minute. Jérôme Boateng was sent-off in the 17th minute. Manuel Neuer saved the subsequent penalty shot. Boateng received a three-match ban for the red card which was later reduced to two matches. Bayern finished the matchday in first place. On matchday 20, on 7 February, Bayern defeated VfB Stuttgart 2–0 with goals from Arjen Robben and David Alaba to win their first match of 2015. Just before half-time, Robben scored the opening goal of the match. Then in the 50th minute, Alaba scored from a free kick from about 30 yards out from goal. Bayern finished the matchday in first place. On matchday 21, on 14 February, Bayern defeated Hamburger SV 8–0 with two goals each from Thomas Müller, Mario Götze, and Arjen Robben and a goal each from Robert Lewandowski and Franck Ribéry. This was Bayern's biggest victory since their 9–0 win against Kickers Offenbach in March 1984. In the 21st minute, Müller opened the scoring from the penalty mark. two minutes later, Götze put Bayern up 2–0. Robben scored the next two goals. The first goal happened in the 36th minute and the second goal happened in the 47th minute. Bayern went up 5–0 after Müller's second goal of the match in the 55th minute. Lewandowski made it 6–0 a minute later. Ribéry scored in the 69th minute. Götze finished the scoring in 88th minute. Bayern finished the matchday in first place. On matchday 22, on 21 February, Bayern defeated Paderborn 07 6–0 with two goals each from Robert Lewandoweski and Arjen Robben and a goal each from Franck Ribéry and Mitchell Weiser. Lewandowski gave Bayern a 2–0 first-half lead when he scored in the 24th and 37th minutes. Robben scored from a penalty kick in the 63rd minute. Florian Hartherz was sent-off on the play that led to the penalty shot. Ribéry scored in the 72nd minute and Weiser scored his first Bundesliga goal in the 78th minute before Robben got his second of the match in the 86th minute. Bayern finished the matchday in first place. On matchday 23, on 27 February, Bayern defeated 1. FC Köln 4–1. Bastian Schweinsteiger, Franck Ribéry, Arjen Robben, and Robert Lewandowski scored for Bayern and Anthony Ujah scored for Köln. Bayern took a 2–0 lead inside the first 10 minutes when Schweinsteiger scored off of a corner kick in the third minute and Ribéry goal in the 10th minute. Ujah pulled a goal back when he scored during stoppage time in the first half. Robben and Lewandowski both scored in the second half to give Bayern the 4–1 lead. Bayern finished the matchday in first place.

==== March ====
On matchday 24, on 7 March, Bayern defeated Hannover 96 3–1. Bayern got two goals from Thomas Müller and a goal from Xabi Alonso and Hiroshi Kiyotake scored for Hannover. Kiyotake Gave Hannover the lead in the 25th minute. Then Xabi Alonso scored the equaliser from a free kick in the 28th minute. Then Müller scored from a penalty kick in the 61st minute. He got his second goal of the match 11 minutes later to put Bayern up 3–1. Dante came off in the 32nd minute and was replaced by Robert Lewandowski. Bayern finished the matchday in first place and took an 11-point lead after VfL Wolfsburg lost to FC Augsburg. On matchday 25, on 14 March, Bayern defeated Werder Bremen 4–0 with two goals from Robert Lewandowski and a goal each from Thomas Müller and David Alaba. Müller scored in the 24th minute and Alaba scored in stoppage time in the first half to give Bayern a 2–0 first half lead. Lewandowski scored in the 76th minute and stoppage time in the second half to put Bayern up 4–0. Bayern finished the matchday in first place. On matchday 26, on 22 March, Bayern lost to Borussia Mönchengladbach 2–0 with two goals, in 30th and 77th minutes, by Raffael. The loss meant that Bayern's six-match winning streak came to an end and they lost at Allianz Arena for the first time since losing to Real Madrid in April 2014. Arjen Robben came off in the 24th minute after he tore an abdominal muscle. Bayern finished the matchday in first place.

==== April ====
On matchday 27, on 4 April, Bayern defeated Borussia Dortmund 1–0 with a 36th-minute goal from Robert Lewandowski. Lewandowski scored from a header after Roman Weidenfeller "parried" Thomas Müller's shot. Bayern and Dortmund came into the match with a 31-point difference in the league table. Four players for Bayern were out with various injuries. Bastian Schweinsteiger was injured during the match. However, Thiago made his first appearance since his injury and Philipp Lahm made his first start since his injury. Bayern finished the matchday in first place. On matchday 28, on 11 April, Bayern defeated Eintracht Frankfurt 3–0 with two goals from Robert Lewandowski and a goal from Thomas Müller. Lewandowski gave Bayern a 1–0 lead in the 15th minute and put Bayern up 2–0 in the 66th minute. Müller scored Bayern's third goal in the 82nd minute. Seven players were out due to injury. Bayern finished the match in first place. On matchday 29, on 18 April, Bayern defeated 1899 Hoffenheim 2–0 with a 38th-minute goal from Sebastian Rode and a second half stoppage time own goal from Andreas Beck. Bayern finished the matchday in first place. On matchday 30, on 25 April, Bayern defeated Hertha BSC 1–0 with a goal from Bastian Schweinsteiger. Schweinsteiger scored in the 80th minute after Mitchell Weiser crossed the ball to him. Javi Martínez was in the squad for the first time in 255 days. Pep Guardiola made five changes to the starting 11 from the Champions League match against Porto in mid-week. Bayern finished the matchday in first place. The following day, Bayern won their 25th German championship (24th Bundesliga championship), and 3rd consecutive championship, after Borussia Mönchengladbach defeated VfL Wolfsburg 1–0.

==== May ====
On matchday 31, on 2 May, Bayern lost to Bayer Leverkusen 2–0 with goals from Hakan Çalhanoğlu and Julian Brandt. Çalhanoğlu scored in the 55th minute from a free kick and Brandt scored in the 81st minute. Pep Guardiola made seven changes from their mid-week German Cup match including Rico Strieder, who made his professional debut, and Javi Martínez, who made his season debut in the Bundesliga. Lukas Görtler, who came on in the 72nd minute, also made his professional debut. On matchday 32, on 9 May, Bayern lost to FC Augsburg 1–0 with a 71st-minute goal from Raúl Bobadilla. Pepe Reina received a red card in the 13th minute. Paul Verhaegh hit the post in the subsequent penalty shot and Reina eventually received a two-match suspension for the red card. Dante also picked up a suspension after receiving his fifth yellow card of the season. This was the first time since October 1991 that Bayern lost four in a row (in all competitions and including shoot-out losses). On 16 May, on matchday 33, Bayern lost 2–1 to SC Freiburg. Bastian Schweinsteiger, gave Bayern the lead in the 13th minute. Admir Mehmedi equalized in the 33rd minute and Nils Petersen scored the winner in the 89th minute. This was Bayern's fifth loss in six matches in all competitions. This was also the first time Freiburg beat Bayern since 9 March 1996. On matchday 34, on 23 May, Bayern defeated Mainz 05 2–0 with a goal from the penalty mark from Robert Lewandowski in the 25th minute and a 48th-minute goal from Bastian Schweinsteiger. Schweinsteiger played in his 500th match for Bayern.

=== Bundesliga table ===
Pos	Team	Pld	W	D	L	GF	GA	GD	Pts	Qualification or relegation
1	Bayern Munich (C)	34	25	4	5	80	18	+62	79	Qualification for the Champions League group stage
2	VfL Wolfsburg	34	20	9	5	72	38	+34	69	Qualification for the Champions League group stage
3	Borussia Mönchengladbach	34	19	9	6	53	26	+27	66	Qualification for the Champions League group stage
4	Bayer Leverkusen	34	17	10	7	62	37	+25	61	Qualification for the Champions League play-off round
5	FC Augsburg	34	15	4	15	43	43	0	49	Qualification for the Europa League group stage (Note: Since the winners of the 2014–15 DFB-Pokal, VfL Wolfsburg, qualified for the Champions League based on league position, the Europa League group stage spot was passed to the sixth-placed team, Schalke 04; and the Europa League third qualifying round spot was passed to the seventh-placed team, Borussia Dortmund.)

Source: DFB
Rules for classification: 1) points; 2) goal difference; 3) number of goals scored
(C) Champions

=== Bundesliga results summary ===
Overall								Home						Away					
Pld	W	D	L	GF	GA	GD	Pts	W	D	L	GF	GA	GD	W	D	L	GF	GA	GD
34	25	4	5	80	18	+62	79	14	1	2	46	7	+39	11	3	3	34	11	+23

Last updated: 23 May 2015.
Source: Bundesliga

=== Bundesliga results ===
Win Draw Loss

MD	Date Kick-off	H/A	Opponent	Res. F–A	Att.	Goalscorers and disciplined players		Table		Ref.
MD	Date Kick-off	H/A	Opponent	Res. F–A	Att.	Bayern Munich	Opponent	Pos.	Pts.	Ref.
1	22 August; 20:30	H	VfL Wolfsburg	2–1	71,000	Müller 37'; Robben 47'	Olić 52'; Luiz Gustavo (yellow card) 69'; Arnold (yellow card) 88'	T3	3	
2	30 August; 18:30	A	Schalke 04	1–1	61,973	Lewandowski 10'; Rode (yellow card) 38'	Kirchhoff (yellow card) 13'; Höger (yellow card) 17'; Draxler (yellow card) 45'; Höwedes 62'	T5	4	
3	13 September; 15:30	H	VfB Stuttgart	2–0	71,000	Götze 27'; Alonso (yellow card) 62'; Ribéry 85'	Romeu (yellow card) 27'	2	7	
4	20 September; 15:30	A	Hamburger SV	0–0	57,000	Højbjerg (yellow card) 90'; Neuer (yellow card) 90'	Arslan (yellow card) 45'; Müller (yellow card) 59'; Behrami (yellow card) 82'	4	8	
5	23 September; 20:00	H	Paderborn 07	4–0	71,000	Götze 8', 78'; Lewandowski 12'; Müller 85'	—	1	11	
6	27 September; 15:30	A	1. FC Köln	2–0	50,000	Götze 19'; Halfar 66' (o.g.)	—	1	14	
7	4 October; 15:30	H	Hannover 96	4–0	71,000	Lewandowski 6', 38'; Robben 13', 79'	—	1	17	
8	18 October; 15:30	H	Werder Bremen	6–0	71,000	Lahm 20', 79'; Alonso 27'; Müller 43' (pen.); Götze 45', 86'	Gálvez (yellow card) 75'	1	20	
9	26 October; 17:30	A	Borussia Mönchengladbach	0–0	54,010	Götze (yellow card) 45'; Dante (yellow card) 48'; Benatia (yellow card) 62'	Wendt (yellow card) 48'	1	21	
10	1 November; 18:30	H	Borussia Dortmund	2–1	71,000	Alonso (yellow card) 37'; Lewandowski 72'; Robben 85' (pen.)	Reus 31'; Piszczek (yellow card) 62'; Subotić (yellow card) 84'	1	24	
11	8 November; 15:30	A	Eintracht Frankfurt	4–0	51,500	Müller 23', 64', 67'; Ribéry (yellow card) 66'; Shaqiri 86'	Chandler (yellow card) 32'; Aigner (yellow card) 38'	1	27	
12	22 November; 15:30	H	1899 Hoffenheim	4–0	71,000	Götze 27'; Boateng (yellow card) 30'; Lewandowski 39'; Robben 82'; Rode 87'; Alonso (yellow card) 88'	Schwegler (yellow card) 28'; Volland (yellow card) 54'; Szalai (red card) 90'	1	30	
13	29 November; 15:30	A	Hertha BSC	1–0	76,197	Robben 27'	Hosogai (yellow card) 80'	1	33	
14	6 December; 18:30	H	Bayer Leverkusen	1–0	71,000	Ribéry 51'	Son (yellow card) 41'; Castro (yellow card) 68'; Bellarabi (yellow card) 89'	1	36	
15	13 December; 15:30	A	FC Augsburg	4–0	30,600	Benatia 58'; Robben 60', 71'; Lewandowski 68'	—	1	39	
16	16 December; 20:00	H	SC Freiburg	2–0	71,000	Benatia (yellow card) 12'; Robben 41'; Müller 48'	Schuster (yellow card) 43'	1	42	
17	19 December; 20:30	A	Mainz 05	2–1	34,000	Schweinsteiger 24'; Robben 90'	Soto 21', (yellow card) 48'; Koo (yellow card) 60'	1	45	
18	30 January; 20:30	A	VfL Wolfsburg	1–4	30,000	Alonso (yellow card) 43'; Schweinsteiger (yellow card) 47'; Bernat 55'	Dost 4', 45+2'; Arnold (yellow card) 43'; De Bruyne 53', 73'; Luiz Gustavo (yellow card) 90+1'	1	45	
19	3 February; 20:00	H	Schalke 04	1–1	75,000	Boateng (red card) 17'; Benatia (yellow card) 64'; Robben 67'; Weiser (yellow card) 80'; Schweinsteiger (yellow card) 86'	Höwedes (yellow card) 46', (goal) 72'	1	46	
20	7 February; 15:30	A	VfB Stuttgart	2–0	60,000	Robben 41'; Alaba 50'; Benatia (yellow card) 86'	Romeu (yellow card) 49'	1	49	
21	14 February; 15:30	H	Hamburger SV	8–0	75,000	Müller 21' (pen.), 55'; Götze 23', 88'; Robben 36', 47'; Lewandowski 56'; Ribéry 69'	Van der Vaart (yellow card) 29'	1	52	
22	21 February; 15:30	A	Paderborn 07	6–0	15,360	Lewandowski 24', 37'; Robben 63' (pen.), 86'; Ribéry 72'; Weiser 78'	Hartherz (red card) 62'	1	55	
23	27 February; 20:30	H	1. FC Köln	4–1	75,000	Schweinsteiger 3'; Ribéry 10'; Robben 67'; Lewandowski 76'	Ujah 45+1'; Halfar (yellow card) 73'	1	58	
24	7 March; 15:30	A	Hannover 96	3–1	49,000	Alonso 28', (yellow card) 39'; Müller 61' (pen.), 72'; Bernat (yellow card) 64'; Ribéry (yellow card) 82'	Kiyotake 25'; Bittencourt (yellow card) 77'	1	61	
25	14 March; 15:30	A	Werder Bremen	4–0	42,100	Müller 24'; Rafinha (yellow card) 29'; Alaba 45'; Benatia (yellow card) 62'; Boateng (yellow card) 67'; Lewandowski 76', 90+1'	Prödl (yellow card) 62'; Junuzović (yellow card) 66'; García (yellow card) 67'	1	64	
26	22 March; 17:30	H	Borussia Mönchengladbach	0–2	75,000	—	Jantschke (yellow card) 22'; Raffael 30', 77'; Hahn (yellow card) 51'	1	64	
27	4 April; 18:30	A	Borussia Dortmund	1–0	80,667	Schweinsteiger (yellow card) 19'; Lewandowski 36'; Alonso (yellow card) 75'; Rode (yellow card) 90'	Aubameyang (yellow card) 21'; Schmelzer (yellow card) 28'	1	67	
28	11 April; 15:30	H	Eintracht Frankfurt	3–0	75,000	Dante (yellow card) 3'; Lewandowski 15', 66'; Müller 82'	Madlung (yellow card) 35'; Stendera (yellow card) 66'; Ignjovski (yellow card) 88'	1	70	
29	18 April; 15:30	A	1899 Hoffenheim	2–0	30,150	Müller (yellow card) 21'; Dante (yellow card) 24'; Rode 38'; Rafinha (yellow card) 66'; Beck 90+3' (o.g.)	Rudy (yellow card) 19'; Beck (yellow card) 68'; Volland (yellow card) 70'	1	73	
30	25 April; 18:30	H	Hertha BSC	1–0	75,000	Schweinsteiger 80'	Kalou (yellow card) 62'	1	76	
31	2 May; 18:30	A	Bayer Leverkusen	0–2	30,210	Dante (yellow card) 71'; Rafinha (yellow card) 88'; Schweinsteiger (yellow card) 89'; Weiser (yellow card) 90+1'	Çalhanoğlu 55'; Brandt 81'; Bellarabi (yellow card) 88'	1	76	
32	9 May; 15:30	H	FC Augsburg	0–1	75,000	Dante (yellow card) 12'; Reina (red card) 13'; Rafinha (yellow card) 90+2'	Bobadilla 71'; Hong (yellow card) 77'	1	76	
33	16 May; 15:30	A	SC Freiburg	1–2	24,000	Schweinsteiger 13'	Mehmedi 33'; Guédé (yellow card) 65'; Petersen 89'	1	76	
34	23 May; 15:30	H	Mainz 05	2–0	75,000	Lewandowski 25' (pen.); Schweinsteiger 48'	—	1	79	

== DFB-Pokal ==
=== DFB-Pokal review ===
The draw for the first round of the DFB-Pokal was held on 1 June. Bayern were drawn against Preußen Münster. The match took place on 17 August. Bayern won 4–1 with goals from Mario Götze, Thomas Müller, David Alaba, and Claudio Pizarro. Rogier Krohne scored for Preußen Münster. Robert Lewandowski failed to convert from the penalty spot in the last minute of the match. Holger Badstuber played his first competitive match since getting injured on 1 December 2012 against Borussia Dortmund. Bastian Schweinsteiger was unavailable for the match. Bayern were drawn against Hamburger SV in the second round draw. The match took place on 29 October with Bayern winning 3–1. Robert Lewandowski, David Alaba, and Franck Ribéry scored for Bayern and Pierre-Michel Lasogga scored for Hamburg. Jaroslav Drobný made several saves against Bayern. Ribéry was hit by a spectator with a scarf which Hamburg were eventually fined for. Medhi Benatia was suspended for the match. Bayern were drawn against Eintracht Braunschweig in the round of 16 draw. The match took place on 4 March. Bayern won 2–0 with two goals from David Alaba and Mario Götze. Alaba scored in stoppage time in the first half after Arjen Robben won a free kick and Götze scored in the 57th minute. In the quarterfinal draw, Bayern were drawn against Bayer Leverkusen. The match took place on 8 April. The match finished in a 0–0 draw with Bayern advancing after winning in a shoot-out 5–3. Leverkusen's first kick was saved after Manuel Neuer "parried" Josip Drmić's shot. Medhi Benatia left the match due to injury in the 34th minute. In the semifinal draw, Bayern were drawn against Borussia Dortmund. The match took place on 28 April. The match finished in a 1–1 draw with Borussia Dortmund winning in a shoot-out. Bayern missed all four of their shots in the shoot-out. Borussia Dortmund converted two of their shots. Robert Lewandowski scored in the 29th minute and Pierre-Emerick Aubameyang scored in the 75th minute for Borussia Dortmund, three minutes after their first shot. Prior to Borussia Dortmund scoring, referee Peter Gagelmann denied Bayern a penalty shot. Borussia Dortmund went down a man after Kevin Kampl was sent–off after receiving a second yellow card. Arjen Robben returned from injury, coming on as a substitute, but left the match after 15 minutes with a calf injury, causing him to miss the rest of the season. Thiago and Lewandowski were also injured during the match. Lewandowski. Robben was "ruled out" for the remainder of the season. Lewandowski sustained a concussion, broken jaw, and broken nose.

=== DFB-Pokal results ===
Win Draw Loss

Date Kick-off	H/A	Opponent	Res. F–A	Att.	Goalscorers and disciplined players		Ref.
Date Kick-off	H/A	Opponent	Res. F–A	Att.	Bayern Munich	Opponent	Ref.
Round 1
17 August; 16:00	A	Preußen Münster	4–1	16,797	Götze 19'; Müller 29'; Shaqiri (yellow card) 37'; Alaba 52'; Pizarro 74'	Krohne 89' (pen.); Heitmeier (red card) 90+1'	
Round 2
29 October; 20:30	A	Hamburger SV	3–1	57,000	Lewandowski 7'; Alaba 44'; Ribéry 55'	Götz (yellow card) 16'; Djourou (yellow card) 33'; Lasogga 85'	
Round of 16
4 March; 20:30	H	Eintracht Braunschweig	2–0	75,000	Schweinsteiger (yellow card) 41'; Alaba 45+1'; Götze 57'; Dante (yellow card) 90+1'	Kessel (yellow card) 6'; Sauer (yellow card) 87'	
Quarterfinals
8 April; 20:30	A	Bayer Leverkusen	0–0 (aet) (5–3 p)	30,210	Dante (yellow card) 71'; Thiago (yellow card) 90+3'; Müller (yellow card) 116'	Bender (yellow card) 50'; Toprak (yellow card) 104'; Papadopoulos (yellow card) 116'; Jedvaj (yellow card) 117'	
8 April; 20:30	A	Bayer Leverkusen	0–0 (aet) (5–3 p)	30,210	Penalties		
8 April; 20:30	A	Bayer Leverkusen	0–0 (aet) (5–3 p)	30,210	Müller (penalty scored); Lewandowski (penalty scored); Alonso (penalty scored); Götze (penalty scored); Thiago (penalty scored)	(penalty missed) Drmić; (penalty scored) Bender; (penalty scored) Castro; (penalty scored) Çalhanoğlu	
Semifinals
28 April; 20:30	H	Borussia Dortmund	1–1 (aet) (0–2 p)	75,000	Lewandowski 29'; Rafinha (yellow card) 64'; Alonso (yellow card) 72'; Benatia (yellow card) 113'	Aubameyang 75'; Kampl (yellow card) 90' (yellow-red card) 108'; Papastathopoulos (yellow card) 101'; Langerak (yellow card) 120'	
28 April; 20:30	H	Borussia Dortmund	1–1 (aet) (0–2 p)	75,000	Penalties		
28 April; 20:30	H	Borussia Dortmund	1–1 (aet) (0–2 p)	75,000	Lahm (penalty missed); Alonso (penalty missed); Götze (penalty missed); Neuer (penalty missed)	(penalty scored) Gündoğan; (penalty scored) Kehl; (penalty missed) Hummels	

== DFL-Supercup ==
=== DFL-Supercup review ===
Bayern faced Borussia Dortmund in the DFL-Supercup on 13 August. Borussia Dortmund won the match 2–0 with goals from Henrikh Mkhitaryan and Pierre-Emerick Aubameyang. Javi Martínez left the match injured after tearing his ACL. This was the third consecutive year where Bayern has faced Borussia Dortmund in the competition. Bayern won the super cup in 2012 2–1 and Borussia Dortmund won in 2013 4–2. The match was originally scheduled for four days earlier. Bayern was without Thiago, Franck Ribéry, and Rafinha. Sebastian Rode, Gianluca Gaudino, Juan Bernat, and Robert Lewandowski made their debuts for Bayern.

=== DFL-Supercup result ===
Win Draw Loss

Date Kick-off	H/A	Opponent	Res. F–A	Att.	Goalscorers and disciplined players		Ref.
Date Kick-off	H/A	Opponent	Res. F–A	Att.	Bayern Munich	Opponent	Ref.
13 August; 18:00	A	Borussia Dortmund	0–2	80,667	Højbjerg (yellow card) 45'; Boateng (yellow card) 73'; Lahm (yellow card) 85'	Mkhitaryan 23'; Aubameyang 62'	

== UEFA Champions League ==
=== Group stage ===
==== Group stage review ====
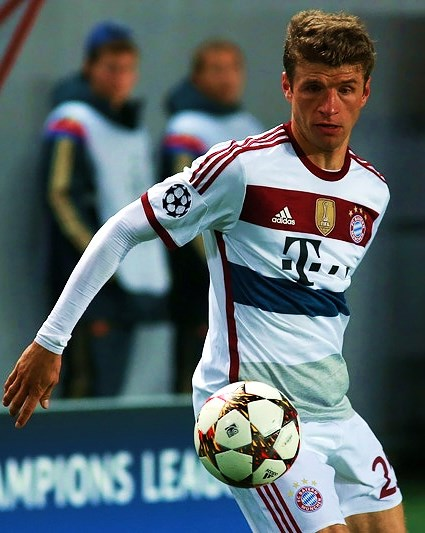
Thomas Müller playing against CSKA Moscow

Bayern were drawn into Group E with Manchester City, CSKA Moscow, and Roma. Bayern started their Champions League campaign on 17 September with a 1–0 win against Manchester City. Jérôme Boateng scored for Bayern after a slight deflection from Mario Götze. Medhi Benatia, made his official debut for Bayern, where he played for 85 minutes, completing 93% of his passes. During the match, Joe Hart "denied" Bayern with a "series of saves." The goal was Bayern's 800th goal in all European competitions. Bayern finished the matchday in second place. On matchday two of the group stage, on 30 September, Bayern defeated CSKA Moscow 1–0 with a goal from a penalty shot from Thomas Müller after Mario Götze was fouled by Mário Fernandes. The match had no supporters in the stadium because of racist behaviour of CSKA Moscow supporters. However, several Bayern supporters who made the trip to Moscow for the match saw the match from a skyscraper. This was the 100th win for Bayern in Champions League history. Bayern finished the matchday in first place. Then Bayern defeated Roma 7–1 on matchday three on 21 October. Bayern got two goals from Arjen Robben and a goal each from Mario Götze, Robert Lewandowski, Thomas Müller, Franck Ribéry, and Xherdan Shaqiri and Gervinho scored for Roma. Gervinho's goal ended Bayern's streak of 813 minutes without conceding a goal. The win was Bayern's biggest away win in Champions League history. Bayern finished the matchday in first place. In the return match against Roma, on matchday four, on 5 November, Bayern won 2–0 with goals from Franck Ribéry and Mario Götze. Ribéry opened the scoring in the 38th minute. Ribéry and David Alaba created a 2-on-1 situation on the left flank. Alaba passed the ball back to Ribéry who scored from the edge of the box. Götze scored the other goal in the 64th minute after Lewandowski pulled away from his marker and crossed the ball to him. Manuel Neuer had to pull off a "double save." Alaba picked up a knee ligament injury in the match. Bayern finished the matchday in first place, and with the win, Bayern clinched top spot in Group E. This was Bayern's quickest path to the knockout round to date. Bayern also became the first German club to win the Group with two matches to spare. Then on matchday five, on 25 November, Manchester City defeated Bayern 3–2. Xabi Alonso and Robert Lewandowski scored for Bayern and Sergio Agüero scored three goals from Manchester City. Agüero scored the opening goal from the penalty spot. Medhi Benatia was sent-off on the play that led up to the penalty shot. The following day, he received a one-match ban for the red card. Alonso equalised when he scored from a free kick in the 40th minute. Five minutes later, Lewandowski scored to give Bayern a 2–1 lead. Stevan Jovetić picked out an Alonso pass and then passed it to Agüero, who scored in the 85th minute. Then Agüero scored in stoppage time to give Manchester City a 3–2 lead. On 10 December, Bayern finished the group stage with a 3–0 win against CSKA Moscow with goals from Thomas Müller, Sebastian Rode and Mario Götze. Müller opened the scoring in the 18th minute from the penalty spot. This was his record-breaking 24th goal in UEFA Champions League for Bayern. Rode and Götze rounded out the scoring in the 84th and 90th minutes. Gianluca Gaudino played in his first UEFA Champions League match.

==== Group E table ====
Pos	Team	Pld	W	D	L	GF	GA	GD	Pts	Qualification	BAY	MCI	ROM	CSKA
1	(Germany) Bayern Munich	6	5	0	1	16	4	+12	15	Advance to knockout phase	—	1–0	2–0	3–0
2	(England) Manchester City	6	2	2	2	9	8	+1	8	Advance to knockout phase	3–2	—	1–1	1–2
3	(Italy) Roma	6	1	2	3	8	14	−6	5	Transfer to Europa League	1–7	0–2	—	5–1
4	(Russia) CSKA Moscow	6	1	2	3	6	13	−7	5		0–1	2–2	1–1	—

Source: UEFA
Rules for classification: Group stage tiebreakers

==== Group stage results summary ====
Overall								Home						Away					
Pld	W	D	L	GF	GA	GD	Pts	W	D	L	GF	GA	GD	W	D	L	GF	GA	GD
6	5	0	1	16	4	+12	15	3	0	0	6	0	+6	2	0	1	10	4	+6

Last updated: 15 December 2014.
Source: Champions League Group Stage matches

==== Group stage results ====
Win Draw Loss

MD	Date Kick-off	H/A	Opponent	Res. F–A	Att.	Goalscorers and disciplined players		Table		Ref.
MD	Date Kick-off	H/A	Opponent	Res. F–A	Att.	Bayern Munich	Opponent	Pos.	Pts.	Ref.
1	17 September; 20:45	H	Manchester City	1–0	68,000	Boateng 90'	Džeko (yellow card) 41'; Kompany (yellow card) 45'; Clichy (yellow card) 65'; Demichelis (yellow card) 77'	2	3	
2	30 September; 18:00	A	CSKA Moscow	1–0	0	Müller 22' (pen.); Lahm (yellow card) 40'; Benatia (yellow card) 68'	Eremenko (yellow card) 45'	1	6	
3	21 October; 20:45	A	Roma	7–1	65,000	Robben 9', 30'; Götze 23'; Lewandowski 25'; Müller 36' (pen.); Bernat (yellow card) 63'; Ribéry 78'; Shaqiri 80'	Iturbe (yellow card) 29'; Torosidis (yellow card) 56'; Nainggolan (yellow card) 57'; Gervinho 66'	1	9	
4	5 November; 20:45	H	Roma	2–0	68,000	Ribéry 38'; Alonso (yellow card) 45+1'; Götze 64'	—	1	12	
5	25 November; 20:45	A	Manchester City	2–3	47,726	Benatia (red card) 21'; Alonso 40'; Lewandowski 45'; Neuer (yellow card) 78'	Agüero 21' (pen.), 85', 90+1', (yellow card) 90+2'; Clichy (yellow card) 60'; Zabaleta (yellow card) 90'	1	12	
6	10 December; 20:45	H	CSKA Moscow	3–0	68,000	Müller 18' (pen.); Dante (yellow card) 68'; Rode 84'; Götze 90'	Natcho (yellow card) 27'; Dzagoev (yellow card) 70'; Ignashevich (yellow card) 90+2'	1	15	

=== Knockout phase ===
==== Knockout phase review ====
On 5 November, after beating A.S. Roma 2–0, Bayern Munich won the group and qualified for the knockout phase. In the round of 16 draw, on 15 December, Bayern were drawn against Shakhtar Donetsk. In the first leg, on 17 February, the match finished in a 0–0 draw. The match was played in Lviv. Xabi Alonso, who played in his 100th Champions League match, was sent-off after receiving a second yellow card. Douglas Costa received a yellow card after he elbowed Franck Ribéry. There was 35 fouls and eight yellow cards in the match. The second leg took place on 11 March. Bayern defeated Shakhtar Donetsk 7–0 with two goals from Thomas Müller and a goal each from Jérôme Boateng, Franck Ribéry, Holger Badstuber, Robert Lewandowski and Mario Götze. Bayern won on aggregate by the same scoreline. Müller gave Bayern the lead in the fourth minute from a penalty shot. Oleksandr Kucher was sent-off on the play leading top the penalty shot. This was the "quickest" red card to be shown in Champions League history. Arjen Robben left the match injured in the 19th minute. Boateng made it 2–0 in the 34th minute. In the 49th minute, Ribéry scored to put Bayern up 3–0. Bayern went up 4–0 when Müller got his second of the match in the 52nd minute. Ribéry left the match in the 60th minute due to an ankle injury. Badstuber scored in the 63rd minute to put Bayern up by 5. This was his first goal since December 2009. Lewandowski scored in the 75th minute to make it 6–0. It was 7–0 when Götze scored in the 88th minute. The scoreline tied for the biggest win in the club's Champions League history.

In the quarterfinal draw, Bayern were drawn against Porto. This is Bayern's fourth straight quarterfinal. The first leg took place on 15 April. Porto won the first leg 3–1. Thiago scored for Bayern and Porto got two goals from Ricardo Quaresma and a goal from Jackson Martínez. Quaresma scored two goals in the first 10 minutes. For the first goal, Quaresma scored from a penalty shot in the third minute after Manuel Neuer tripped Martínez inside the penalty area. Neuer received a yellow card on the play. For his second goal in the 10th minute, Quaresma "nicking the ball from Dante" to set-up the goal. Then in the 28th minute, Thiago put Bayern on the scoreboard. Martínez scored in the 65th minute to make it 3–1. The loss finished Bayern's 11-match undefeated streak in Portugal. The following day, Hans-Wilhelm Müller-Wohlfahrt, along with three other members of the medical team, resigned after the medical team was blamed for the loss. The second leg took place on 21 April. Bayern defeated Porto 6–1 and 7–4 on aggregate. Bayern got two goals from Robert Lewandowski and a goal each from Thiago, Jérôme Boateng, Thomas Müller, and Xabi Alonso. Jackson scored for Porto. Bayern took a 2–0 lead within the first 22 minutes with goals from Thiago and Boateng. Lewendowski put Bayern up by three in the 27th minute. Bayern were up 4–0 after Müller scored in the 36th minute. With the goal, he became the highest scoring German in the competition's history. Lewandowski got his second goal of the match when he scored in the 40th minute. Jackson scored for Porto in the 73rd minute and Alonso scored in the 88th minute from a free kick. The free kick was given after Iván Marcano fouled Thiago, in which he was sent-off for a second yellow card for Porto. The win sent Bayern to their fourth consecutive semifinal. This was Pep Guardiola's 100th match as head coach.

In the semi-finals, Bayern were drawn against Barcelona, Guardiola's former club. The match took place on 6 May. Barcelona won the first leg 3–0 with two goals from Lionel Messi and a goal from Neymar. The score remained 0–0 until the 77th minute when Messi scored. Messi added his second of the match three minutes later. Neymar added Barcelona's third goal in stoppage time. Bayern failed to register a shot on target for the first time since October 2009 when they lost to Girondins de Bordeaux. The second leg took place on 12 May. Bayern won the match 3–2, however, Bayern lost 5–3 on aggregate. Medhi Benatia, Robert Lewandowski, and Thomas Müller scored for Bayern and Neymar scored twice for Barcelona. Benatia gave Bayern a 1–0 lead in the seventh minute. Then Neymar scored in the 15th and 29th minutes. Then Lewandowski and Müller scored in the second half. The win ended Bayern's four match losing streak.

==== Knockout phase results ====
Win Draw Loss

Leg	Date Kick-off	H/A	Opponent	Res. F–A	Agg. score F–A	Att.	Goalscorers and disciplined players		Ref.
Leg	Date Kick-off	H/A	Opponent	Res. F–A	Agg. score F–A	Att.	Bayern Munich	Opponent	Ref.
Round of 16
1	17 February; 20:45	A	Shakhtar Donetsk	0–0	—	34,915	Rafinha (yellow card) 23'; Alonso (yellow card) 24' (yellow-red card) 65'; Boateng (yellow card) 80'; Schweinsteiger (yellow card) 85'	Srna (yellow card) 39'; Costa (yellow card) 58'; Fred (yellow card) 77'	
2	11 March; 20:45	H	Shakhtar Donetsk	7–0	7–0	70,000	Müller 4' (pen.), 52'; Badstuber (yellow card) 26', (goal) 63'; Boateng 34', (yellow card) 38'; Ribéry 49'; Lewandowski 75'; Götze 88'	Kucher (red card) 3'; Costa (yellow card) 38'	
Quarterfinals
1	15 April; 20:45	A	Porto	1–3	—	50,092	Neuer (yellow card) 2'; Bernat (yellow card) 16'; Thiago 28'; Lahm (yellow card) 38'; Rode (yellow card) 71'	Quaresma 3' (pen.), 10'; Casemiro (yellow card) 31'; Alex Sandro (yellow card) 37'; Martínez 65'; Danilo (yellow card) 83'	
2	21 April; 20:45	H	Porto	6–1	7–4	70,000	Thiago 14'; Boateng 22'; Lewandowski 27', 40'; Müller 36'; Badstuber (yellow card) 42'; Alonso 88'	Herrera (yellow card) 34'; Martínez (yellow card) 38', (goal) 73'; Ricardo (yellow card) 65'; Marcano (yellow card) 71' (yellow-red card) 87'	
Semifinals
1	6 May; 20:45	A	Barcelona	0–3	—	95,639	Alonso (yellow card) 35'; Benatia (yellow card) 52'; Bernat (yellow card) 56'	Alves (yellow card) 46'; Piqué (yellow card) 66'; Neymar (yellow card) 69', (goal) 90+4'; Messi 77', 80'	
2	12 May; 20:45	H	Barcelona	3–2	3–5	70,000	Benatia 7'; Rafinha (yellow card) 41'; Thiago (yellow card) 45+2'; Lewandowski 59', (yellow card) 76'; Müller 74'; Alonso (yellow card) 81'; Rode (yellow card) 84'	Neymar 15', 29'; Rakitić (yellow card) 64'; Pedro (yellow card) 85'	

== Team record ==
Competition	First match	Last match	Starting round	Final position / round	Record								
Competition	First match	Last match	Starting round	Final position / round	M	W	D	L	GF	GA	GD	Win %	Ref.
Bundesliga	22 August	23 May	—	Winners	34	25	4	5	80	18	+62	73.53	
DFB-Pokal	17 August	28 April	Round 1	Semifinals	5	3	2	0	10	3	+7	60.00	DFB-Pokal results
DFL-Supercup	13 August		Final	Runners-up	1	0	0	1	0	2	−2	0.00	
Champions League	17 September	12 May	Group stage	Semifinals	12	8	1	3	33	13	+20	66.67	Group stage results Knockout phase results
Total					52	36	7	9	123	36	+87	69.23	—

== Player information ==
=== Squad and statistics ===
==== Squad, appearances, and goals scored ====
As of 23 May 2015

No.	Pos	Nat	Player	Total		Bundesliga		DFB-Pokal		DFL-Supercup		Champions League	
No.	Pos	Nat	Player	Apps	Goals	Apps	Goals	Apps	Goals	Apps	Goals	Apps	Goals
1	GK	(Germany) GER	Manuel Neuer	50	0	31+1	0	5+0	0	1+0	0	12+0	0
22	GK	(Germany) GER	Tom Starke	0	0	0+0	0	0+0	0	0	0	0+0	0
23	GK	(Spain) ESP	Pepe Reina	3	0	3+0	0	0+0	0	0	0	0+0	0
4	DF	(Brazil) BRA	Dante	39	0	21+6	0	4+0	0	0+1	0	3+4	0
5	DF	(Morocco) MAR	Medhi Benatia	24	2	13+2	1	2+0	0	0	0	7+0	1
8	DF	(Spain) ESP	Javi Martínez	3	0	1+0	0	0+0	0	1+0	0	0+1	0
13	DF	(Brazil) BRA	Rafinha	41	0	24+2	0	4+0	0	0	0	9+2	0
17	DF	(Germany) GER	Jérôme Boateng	44	3	25+2	0	5+0	0	1+0	0	11+0	3
18	DF	(Spain) ESP	Juan Bernat	49	1	28+3	1	4+1	0	1+0	0	11+1	0
21	DF	(Germany) GER	Philipp Lahm	33	2	17+3	2	4+0	0	0+1	0	8+0	0
27	DF	(Austria) AUT	David Alaba	29	5	19+0	2	3+0	3	1+0	0	6+0	0
28	DF	(Germany) GER	Holger Badstuber	16	1	9+1	0	1+1	0	0	0	2+2	1
3	MF	(Spain) ESP	Xabi Alonso	40	4	24+2	2	4+0	0	0	0	10+0	2
6	MF	(Spain) ESP	Thiago	13	2	2+5	0	1+1	0	0	0	4+0	2
7	MF	(France) FRA	Franck Ribéry	23	9	9+6	5	2+0	1	0	0	5+1	3
10	MF	(Netherlands) NED	Arjen Robben	30	19	20+1	17	1+1	0	0	0	5+2	2
16	MF	(Germany) GER	Gianluca Gaudino	11	0	4+4	0	0+1	0	1+0	0	1+0	0
19	MF	(Germany) GER	Mario Götze	48	15	28+4	9	3+1	2	0+1	0	9+2	4
20	MF	(Germany) GER	Sebastian Rode	35	3	8+15	2	0+4	0	1+0	0	2+5	1
25	MF	(Germany) GER	Thomas Müller	48	21	28+4	13	4+1	1	1+0	0	10+0	7
30	MF	(Germany) GER	Mitchell Weiser	16	1	8+5	1	1+0	0	0	0	0+2	0
31	MF	(Germany) GER	Bastian Schweinsteiger	28	5	15+5	5	1+1	0	0	0	5+1	0
9	FW	(Poland) POL	Robert Lewandowski	49	25	28+3	17	5+0	2	1+0	0	10+2	6
14	FW	(Peru) PER	Claudio Pizarro	17	1	2+11	0	0+2	1	0	0	0+2	0
24	FW	(Germany) GER	Sinan Kurt	1	0	0+1	0	0+0	0	0	0	0+0	0
Players who left during the season.
11	MF	(Switzerland) SUI	Xherdan Shaqiri	15	2	3+6	1	1+0	0	1+0	0	0+4	1
34	MF	(Denmark) DEN	Pierre-Emile Højbjerg	13	0	3+5	0	0+1	0	1+0	0	2+1	0

==== Top scorers ====
As of 25 May 2015

Rank	Player	Position	Bundesliga	DFB-Pokal	DFL-Supercup	UEFA CL	Total
1	(Poland) Robert Lewandowski	FW	17	2	0	6	25
2	(Germany) Thomas Müller	MF	13	1	0	7	21
3	(Netherlands) Arjen Robben	MF	17	0	0	2	19
4	(Germany) Mario Götze	MF	9	2	0	4	15
5	(France) Franck Ribéry	MF	5	1	0	3	9
6	(Austria) David Alaba	DF	2	3	0	0	5
6	(Germany) Bastian Schweinsteiger	MF	5	0	0	0	5
7	(Spain) Xabi Alonso	MF	2	0	0	2	4
9	(Germany) Jérôme Boateng	DF	0	0	0	3	3
9	(Germany) Sebastian Rode	MF	2	0	0	1	3
11	(Spain) Thiago	MF	0	0	0	2	2
11	(Morocco) Medhi Benatia	DF	1	0	0	1	2
11	(Germany) Philipp Lahm	DF	2	0	0	0	2
11	(Switzerland) Xherdan Shaqiri	MF	1	0	0	1	2
15	(Germany) Holger Badstuber	DF	0	0	0	1	1
15	(Spain) Juan Bernat	DF	1	0	0	0	1
15	(Peru) Claudio Pizarro	FW	0	1	0	0	1
15	(Germany) Mitchell Weiser	MF	1	0	0	0	1
Own goals			2	0	0	0	2
Total			80	10	0	33	123

=== Discipline ===
==== Cards ====
Player	Total			Bundesliga			DFB-Pokal			DFL-Supercup			Champions League			Ref.
Player	Yellow card	(yellow card) (red card)	Red card	Yellow card	(yellow card) (red card)	Red card	Yellow card	(yellow card) (red card)	Red card	Yellow card	(yellow card) (red card)	Red card	Yellow card	(yellow card) (red card)	Red card	Ref.
Xabi Alonso	10	1	0	6	0	0	1	0	0	0	0	0	3	1	0	
Medhi Benatia	8	0	1	5	0	0	1	0	0	0	0	0	2	0	1	
Jérôme Boateng	5	0	1	2	0	1	0	0	0	1	0	0	2	0	0	
Pierre-Emile Højbjerg	2	0	0	1	0	0	0	0	0	1	0	0	0	0	0	
Philip Lahm	3	0	0	0	0	0	0	0	0	1	0	0	2	0	0	
Manuel Neuer	3	0	0	1	0	0	0	0	0	0	0	0	2	0	0	
Dante	8	0	0	5	0	0	2	0	0	0	0	0	1	0	0	
Bastian Schweinsteiger	6	0	0	4	0	0	1	0	0	0	0	0	1	0	0	
Juan Bernat	4	0	0	1	0	0	0	0	0	0	0	0	3	0	0	
Xherdan Shaqiri	1	0	0	0	0	0	1	0	0	0	0	0	0	0	0	
Sebastian Rode	4	0	0	2	0	0	0	0	0	0	0	0	2	0	0	
Mario Götze	1	0	0	1	0	0	0	0	0	0	0	0	0	0	0	
Franck Ribéry	2	0	0	2	0	0	0	0	0	0	0	0	0	0	0	
David Alaba	0	0	0	0	0	0	0	0	0	0	0	0	0	0	0	
Tom Starke	0	0	0	0	0	0	0	0	0	0	0	0	0	0	0	
Pepe Reina	0	0	1	0	0	1	0	0	0	0	0	0	0	0	0	
Javi Martínez	0	0	0	0	0	0	0	0	0	0	0	0	0	0	0	
Rafinha	7	0	0	4	0	0	1	0	0	0	0	0	2	0	0	
Thiago	2	0	0	0	0	0	1	0	0	0	0	0	1	0	0	
Arjen Robben	0	0	0	0	0	0	0	0	0	0	0	0	0	0	0	
Gianluca Gaudino	0	0	0	0	0	0	0	0	0	0	0	0	0	0	0	
Thomas Müller	2	0	0	1	0	0	1	0	0	0	0	0	0	0	0	
Mitchell Weiser	2	0	0	2	0	0	0	0	0	0	0	0	0	0	0	
Robert Lewandowski	1	0	0	0	0	0	0	0	0	0	0	0	1	0	0	
Claudio Pizarro	0	0	0	0	0	0	0	0	0	0	0	0	0	0	0	
Sinan Kurt	0	0	0	0	0	0	0	0	0	0	0	0	0	0	0	
Holger Badstuber	0	0	0	0	0	0	0	0	0	0	0	0	0	0	0	
Totals	71	1	3	36	0	2	9	0	0	3	0	0	22	1	1	—
Last updated: 12 May 2015

==== Suspensions ====
The first suspension of the season was Jérôme Boateng when he was suspended for the last match of the 2013–14 season and the first match of the 2014–15 season. The next Bayern suspension was Medhi Benatia which he had picked up in the 2013–14 Coppa Italia with Roma. Benatia was again suspended after picking up a red card against Manchester City in Champions League. He was given a one match ban. Jérôme Boateng was suspended after picking up a red card against Schalke 04. He was originally given a three-match ban. However, after appeal, the ban was reduced to two matches. Xabi Alonso was sent off for two bookable offences and missed the return leg on 11 March. Alonso also picked up his fifth yellow card against Hannover 96 on 7 March and was suspended for the match against Werder Bremen on 14 March. During the match against Werder Bremen, Benatia picked up a fifth yellow card and was suspended for the match on 22 March against Borussia Mönchengladbach. Pepe Reina received a two-match suspension after his red card against FC Augsburg.

Player	No. of matches served	Reason	Competition	Date served	Opponent(s)	Ref.
Jérôme Boateng	2	Red card vs. Hamburger SV	Bundesliga (2013–14 season)	10 May	VfB Stuttgart	
Jérôme Boateng	2	Red card vs. Hamburger SV	Bundesliga (2014–15 season)	22 August	VfL Wolfsburg	
Medhi Benatia	1	Suspension from 2013–14 Coppa Italia	DFB-Pokal	29 October	Hamburger SV	
Medhi Benatia	1	Red card vs. Manchester City	UEFA Champions League	10 December	CSKA Moscow	
Jérôme Boateng	2	Red card vs. Schalke 04	Bundesliga	7 February	VfB Stuttgart	
Jérôme Boateng	2	Red card vs. Schalke 04	Bundesliga	14 February	Hamburger SV	
Xabi Alonso	1	Red Card vs. Shakhtar Donetsk	UEFA Champions League	11 March	Shakhtar Donetsk	
Xabi Alonso	1	Fifth yellow card	Bundesliga	14 March	Werder Bremen	
Medhi Benatia	1	Fifth yellow card	Bundesliga	22 March	Borussia Mönchengladbach	
Dante	1	Fifth yellow card	Bundesliga	16 May	SC Freiburg	
Pepe Reina	2	Red card vs. FC Augsburg.	Bundesliga	16 May	SC Freiburg	
Pepe Reina	2	Red card vs. FC Augsburg.	Bundesliga	23 May	Mainz 05	

== Awards ==
- Manuel Neuer won the German Footballer of the Year.
- Manuel Neuer, Arjen Robben, Philipp Lahm, and Thomas Müller were among the top 10 players nominated for UEFA Best Player in Europe Award. Manuel Neuer and Arjen Robben joined Cristiano Ronaldo from Real Madrid on the shortlisted for the award. Ronaldo won the award.
- Mario Götze, Philipp Lahm, Thomas Müller, Manuel Neuer, Arjen Robben and Bastian Schweinsteiger were nominated to the 2014 FIFA Ballon d'Or shortlist and Pep Guardiola was named to the shortlist for the FIFA World Coach of the Year for Men's Football. On 1 December 2014, Neuer was nominated as a final three candidate. On 12 January 2015, he finished third in the voting.
- David Alaba was named the Austrian Footballer of the Year.
- Manuel Neuer, David Alaba, Philipp Lahm, and Arjen Robben were voted in to the UEFA Team of the Year.
- Manuel Neuer, Philipp Lahm, Arjen Robben, and last-years' player Toni Kroos were voted in to the FIFA/FIFPro World XI 2014.
- Robert Lewandowski was named Polish player of the year.

== Reserve team ==
=== Summary ===
Bayern Munich II play in the fourth-tier Regionalliga Bayern for a third consecutive season. They were coached by Erik ten Hag.

=== Squad ===
Source: Note: Flags indicate national team as defined under FIFA eligibility rules; some limited exceptions apply. Players may hold more than one non-FIFA nationality.

No.	Pos.	Nation	Player
1	GK	AUT	Ivan Lucic
2	DF	GER	Herbert Paul
3	DF	GER	Philipp Steinhart
4	DF	GER	Stefan Buck
5	DF	GER	Edwin Schwarz
6	MF	GER	Rico Strieder
7	FW	GER	Tobias Schweinsteiger (captain)
8	DF	AUT	Ylli Sallahi
9	FW	GER	Gerrit Wegkamp
10	FW	GER	Bastian Fischer
11	FW	GER	Patrick Weihrauch
12	GK	GER	Andreas Rössl
13	DF	GER	Giuseppe Leo

No.	Pos.	Nation	Player
14	MF	FRA	Steeven Ribéry
15	DF	GER	Matthias Strohmaier
16	MF	GRE	Angelos Oikonomou
17	MF	GER	Lukas Görtler
18	MF	GER	Kodjovi Koussou
19	MF	GER	Sebastian Bösel
20	MF	GER	Nikola Jelišić
22	MF	GER	Ricardo Basta
23	MF	THA	Alexander Sieghart
24	DF	AUT	Patrick Puchegger
25	GK	GER	Leopold Zingerle
26	FW	GER	Lennart Ingmann

== Technical staff ==
Position	Held by	Ref.
President	Karl Hopfner	
Chief executive officer	Karl-Heinz Rummenigge	
Sporting director	Matthias Sammer	
Manager	Pep Guardiola	
