= Gianluca Gaudino =

German footballer

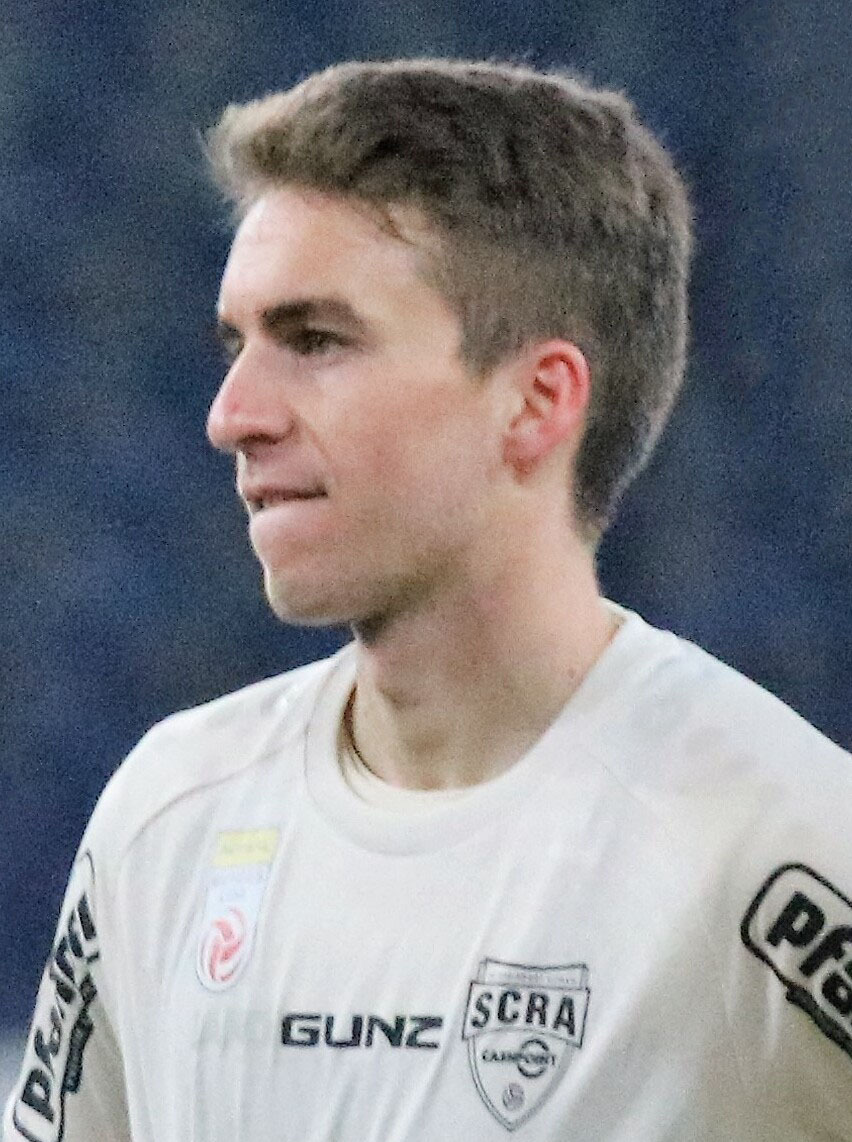
- Gaudino with Rheindorf Altach in 2022

Personal information
- Date of birth: 11 November 1996 (age 30)
- Place of birth: Hanau, Germany
- Height: 1.75 m (5 ft 9 in)
- Position: Midfielder

Team information
- Current team: VfR Aalen
- Number: 46

Youth career
- 2001–2004: SV 98 Schwetzingen
- 2004–2014: Bayern Munich

Senior career*
Years	Team	Apps	(Gls)
2014–2017	Bayern Munich	8	(0)
2015–2017	Bayern Munich II	19	(0)
2016–2017	→ St. Gallen (loan)	34	(0)
2017–2018	Chievo	2	(0)
2019–2021	Young Boys	60	(5)
2019	Young Boys II	1	(0)
2021–2022	SV Sandhausen	6	(0)
2022	→ Rheindorf Altach (loan)	14	(0)
2022–2023	Lausanne-Sport	25	(2)
2024	SV Stripfing	3	(0)
2024–2026	Alemannia Aachen	51	(4)
2026–	VfR Aalen	8	(4)

International career
2014–2015	Germany U19	5	(0)
2016	Germany U20	1	(0)
- * Club domestic league appearances and goals as of 24 September 2026

Gianluca Gaudino (German pronunciation: [dʒanˈluːkaː ɡaʊˈdiːnoː], Italian: [dʒanˈluːka gauˈdiːno]; born 11 November 1996) is a German professional footballer who plays as a midfielder for Regionalliga Südwest club VfR Aalen.

== Club career ==
=== Bayern Munich ===
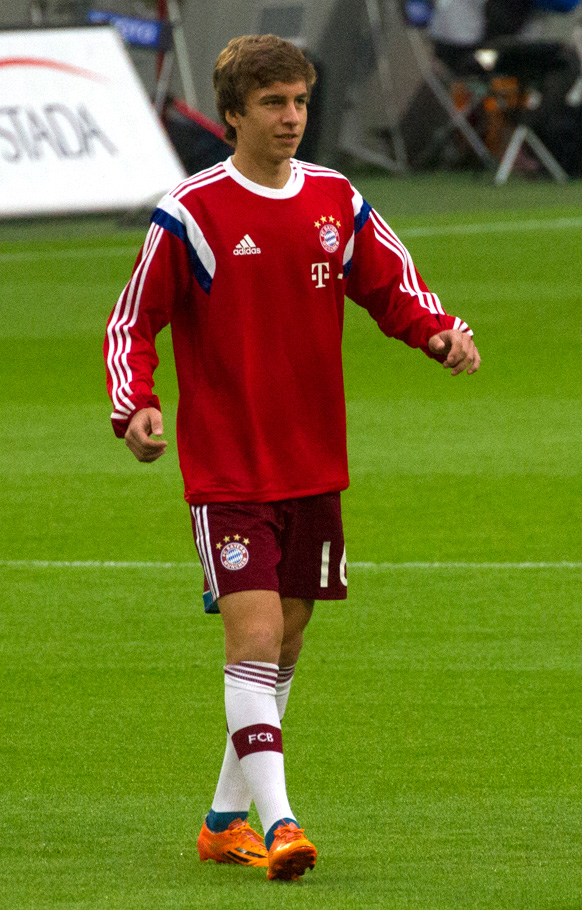
Gaudino with Bayern Munich in 2014

Gaudino, is a youth product of the Bayern Munich Academy. He was promoted to the first team for the 2014–15 season after impressing Pep Guardiola. On 13 August 2014, he made his first-team debut in the German Supercup, playing the full 90 minutes as Bayern lost 2–0 against Borussia Dortmund. He made his league debut in the first match of the 2014–15 Bundesliga season as a starter against VfL Wolfsburg. Bayern won the match 2–1, and Gaudino became the fourth youngest debutant in the club's history. Gaudino made his Champions League debut on 10 December 2014 in a 3–0 home win against CSKA Moscow. For the 2015–16 season, he played for the reserve team where he made 19 appearances.

==== St. Gallen (loan) ====
Gaudino was loaned out to FC St. Gallen on 9 January 2016 until the end of the 2016–17 season.

=== Chievo ===
In June 2017, Gaudino joined Serie A side Chievo Verona. In August 2018, after having not been used frequently, Gaudino and the club agreed to mutually terminate his contract.

=== Young Boys ===
On 8 January 2019, Gaudino joined Swiss club Young Boys. Young Boys won the league on 12 April after FC Basel dropped points against Grasshoppers. In the 2019–20 Swiss Super League season, Gaudino became a key player in the Young Boys' journey to winning the Swiss double by playing a total of 34 games and scoring five goals to push them in winning the Swiss League for the third straight time and the Swiss Cup.

=== SV Sandhausen ===
On 9 June 2021, Gaudino returned to Germany where he joined 2. Bundesliga club SV Sandhausen. In Sandhausen, however, he failed to make an impact and was mainly a substitute. This was partly attributed to Gaudino being sidelined after being tested positive for COVID-19.

==== Rheindorf Altach (loan) ====
On 31 January 2022, Gaudino moved to Austrian club Rheindorf Altach on loan until the end of the season.

=== Lausanne-Sport ===
Gaudino joined Swiss Challenge League club Lausanne-Sport on 29 June 2022. The move reunited him with his manager at Rheindorf Altach, Ludovic Magnin.

=== SV Stripfing ===
On 3 February 2024, Gaudino moved to SV Stripfing in Austria. He missed most of the games with ligaments injury.

=== Alemannia Aachen ===
On 27 June 2024, Gaudino signed with Alemannia Aachen in 3. Liga.

== Personal life ==
Gaudino was born in Hanau, Hesse, on 11 November 1996 and is the son of former German international midfielder Maurizio Gaudino. He is eligible to play for either Germany or Italy due to his Italian paternal grandparents.

== Career statistics ==
As of 1 July 2021

Appearances and goals by club, season and competition
Club	Season	League			Cup		Continental		Other		Total		Ref.
Club	Season	League	Apps	Goals	Apps	Goals	Apps	Goals	Apps	Goals	Apps	Goals	Ref.
Bayern Munich	2014–15	Bundesliga	8	0	1	0	1	0	1	0	11	0	
Bayern Munich II	2015–16	Regionalliga Bayern	19	0	–		–		–		19	0	
St. Gallen (loan)	2015–16	Swiss Super League	15	0	0	0	—		—		15	0	
St. Gallen (loan)	2016–17	Swiss Super League	18	0	3	0	—		—		21	0	
St. Gallen (loan)	Total		33	0	3	0	0	0	0	0	36	0	—
Chievo Verona	2017–18	Serie A	2	0	1	0	—		—		3	0	
Young Boys	2018–19	Swiss Super League	11	1	0	0	0	0	–		11	1	
Young Boys	2019–20	Swiss Super League	25	4	6	1	3	0	–		34	5	
Young Boys	2020–21	Swiss Super League	24	0	0	0	10	1	–		34	1	
Young Boys	Total		60	5	6	1	13	1	0	0	79	7	—
Young Boys II	2018–19	Swiss 1. Liga	1	0	–		–		–		1	0	
Career total			123	5	11	1	14	1	1	0	149	7	—

== Honours ==
Bayern Munich

- Bundesliga: 2014–15
- DFL-Supercup: runner-up 2014

Young Boys

- Swiss Super League: 2018–19, 2019–20
- Swiss Cup: 2019–20
