= 2014 DFL-Supercup =

- Match programme cover
- Event: DFL-Supercup
Borussia Dortmund	Bayern Munich
2	0
- Date: 13 August 2014
- Venue: Signal Iduna Park, Dortmund
- Referee: Peter Gagelmann (Bremen)
- Attendance: 80,667

The 2014 DFL-Supercup was the fifth edition of the German Super Cup under the name DFL-Supercup, an annual football match contested by the winners of the previous season's Bundesliga and DFB-Pokal competitions. It featured Bayern Munich, winners of the 2013–14 Bundesliga, and Borussia Dortmund, the runners-up of the 2013–14 Bundesliga who also reached the 2014 DFB-Pokal final.

Dortmund were the reigning champions, having beaten Bayern 4–2 in 2013, although the season before, Bayern beat Dortmund 2–1. Both teams had won four previous installments (of seven attempts by Bayern and six by Dortmund), and thus the winners would set a new record. The match took place on 13 August 2014 at Signal Iduna Park in Dortmund.

Dortmund defeated Munich 2–0 to win their record fifth title.

== Teams ==
In the following table, matches until 1996 were in the DFB-Supercup era, since 2010 were in the DFL-Supercup era.

Team	Qualification	Previous appearances (bold indicates winners)
Borussia Dortmund^{TH}	2013–14 Bundesliga runners-up	6 (**1989**, **1995**, **1996**, 2011, 2012, **2013**) (Note: Winners of the unofficial 2008 German Supercup. One-time runners-up in the DFL-Ligapokal.)
Bayern Munich	2013–14 Bundesliga champions and 2013–14 DFB-Pokal winners	7 (**1987**, 1989, **1990**, 1994, **2010**, **2012**, 2013) (Note: Runners-up in the unofficial 2008 German Supercup. Six-time winners and one-time runners-up in the DFL-Ligapokal.)

== Match ==
=== Details ===
13 August 2014
18:00 CEST

Borussia Dortmund	2–0	Bayern Munich
Mkhitaryan 23'; Aubameyang 62'	Report

Signal Iduna Park, Dortmund
Attendance: 80,667
Referee: Peter Gagelmann (Bremen)

**Borussia Dortmund**	**Bayern Munich**

GK	22	(Australia) Mitchell Langerak
RB	26	(Poland) Łukasz Piszczek
CB	25	(Greece) Sokratis Papastathopoulos
CB	28	(Germany) Matthias Ginter
LB	29	(Germany) Marcel Schmelzer	(substituted off) 46'
DM	21	(Germany) Oliver Kirch	(substituted off) 85'
DM	5	(Germany) Sebastian Kehl (c)
AM	7	(Germany) Jonas Hofmann
AM	10	(Armenia) Henrikh Mkhitaryan
CF	17	(Gabon) Pierre-Emerick Aubameyang	(substituted off) 63'
CF	9	(Italy) Ciro Immobile
Substitutes:
GK	33	(Germany) Zlatan Alomerović
DF	4	(Serbia) Neven Subotić
DF	37	(Germany) Erik Durm	(substituted on) 46'
MF	6	(Germany) Sven Bender	(substituted on) 85'
MF	14	(Serbia) Miloš Jojić
MF	19	(Germany) Kevin Großkreutz
FW	20	(Colombia) Adrián Ramos	(substituted on) 63'
Manager:
(Germany) Jürgen Klopp

GK	1	(Germany) Manuel Neuer (c)
CB	17	(Germany) Jérôme Boateng	(yellow card) 73'
CB	8	(Spain) Javi Martínez		(substituted off) 31'
CB	27	(Austria) David Alaba
RM	11	(Switzerland) Xherdan Shaqiri
CM	34	(Denmark) Pierre-Emile Højbjerg	(yellow card) 45'	(substituted off) 59'
CM	16	(Germany) Gianluca Gaudino
CM	20	(Germany) Sebastian Rode
LM	18	(Spain) Juan Bernat
SS	25	(Germany) Thomas Müller		(substituted off) 46'
CF	9	(Poland) Robert Lewandowski
Substitutes:
GK	22	(Germany) Tom Starke
GK	23	(Spain) Pepe Reina
DF	4	(Brazil) Dante		(substituted on) 31'
DF	21	(Germany) Philipp Lahm	(yellow card) 85'	(substituted on) 46'
DF	28	(Germany) Holger Badstuber
MF	19	(Germany) Mario Götze		(substituted on) 59'
FW	14	(Peru) Claudio Pizarro
Manager:
(Spain) Pep Guardiola

Assistant referees:
Sven Jablonski (Bremen)
Thomas Gorniak (Bremen)
Fourth official:
Marco Fritz (Korb)

== See also ==
- 2014–15 Bundesliga
- 2014–15 DFB-Pokal
