= Sebastian Rode =

German footballer (born 1990)

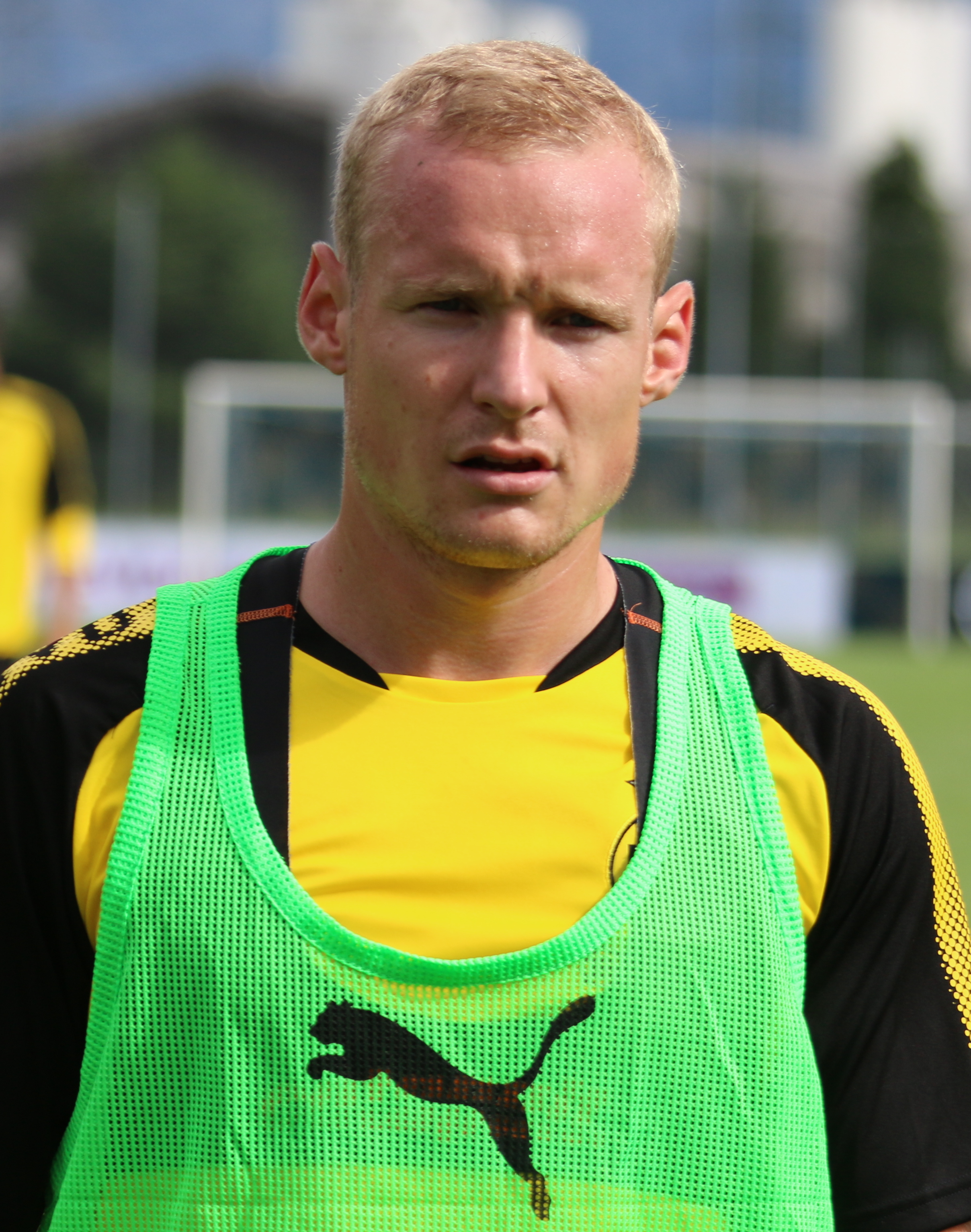
- Rode training with Borussia Dortmund in 2017

Personal information
- Date of birth: 11 October 1990 (age 36)
- Place of birth: Seeheim-Jugenheim, Germany
- Height: 1.80 m (5 ft 11 in)
- Position: Midfielder

Youth career
- 1994–1998: SKV Hähnlein
- 1998–2002: FC Alsbach
- 2002–2004: SC Viktoria Griesheim
- 2004–2005: Darmstadt 98
- 2005–2008: Kickers Offenbach

Senior career*
Years	Team	Apps	(Gls)
2008–2010	Kickers Offenbach	15	(1)
2010–2014	Eintracht Frankfurt	94	(4)
2014–2016	Bayern Munich	38	(3)
2016–2019	Borussia Dortmund	14	(1)
2018	Borussia Dortmund II	2	(0)
2019	→ Eintracht Frankfurt (loan)	12	(0)
2019–2024	Eintracht Frankfurt	108	(9)
Total		283	(18)

International career
2008	Germany U18	1	(0)
2009	Germany U19	4	(1)
2009	Germany U20	1	(0)
2011–2013	Germany U21	6	(0)
- * Club domestic league appearances and goals

Sebastian Rode (German pronunciation: [zeˈbasti̯a(ː)n ˈʁoːdə]; born 11 October 1990) is a German former professional footballer who played as a midfielder.

Beginning his career with Kickers Offenbach in 2008, Rode joined Eintracht Frankfurt two seasons later, where he failed to fully establish himself as a player due to injuries. He signed for Bayern Munich in 2014 and won two Bundesliga titles and a DFB-Pokal. He joined rivals Borussia Dortmund two years later, where he was used sparingly across his stint with the club. He returned to Eintracht Frankfurt at the midterm of the 2019–20 season on loan, and he later joined permanently in the summer of 2020. He was appointed Frankfurt captain in 2021 and won the UEFA Europa League in 2022, and later retired from professional football in 2024.

== Club career ==
=== Kickers Offenbach ===
Rode joined Kickers Offenbach in 2005 and played in their youth teams. In the 2008–09 season, he played in the Under 19 Bundesliga, but was regularly training with the first team. He made his professional debut for Offenbach on 7 March 2009 in the 3. Liga – the third tier of German football – against Eintracht Braunschweig. He developed into a regular starter for the first team in the 2009–10 season, but only made 13 appearances, as suffered an ACL injury in his right knee in September 2009.

=== Eintracht Frankfurt ===
On 3 June 2010, Rode left Offenbach and joined rival team Eintracht Frankfurt, where he signed a contract until June 2014. After sustaining cartilage damage in his left knee in September 2010, he missed the first half of the 2010–11 season. He made his Bundesliga debut on 21 January 2011 in an 1-0 away defeat against Hamburger SV and scored his first Bundesliga goal on 23 April 2011 in a 1-1 draw at home against FC Bayern Munich. Eintracht were relegated from the Bundesliga at the end of the season, but Rode remained with the club despite offers from other Bundesliga clubs. In the following season, he played 33 league games in the 2. Bundesliga, scoring two goals and providing ten assists, making a significant contribution to Eintracht's second place finish and the resulting promotion back to the first division.

In the 2012–13 season, Rode kept his position as a regular starter, playing 33 league games. At the end of the season, Eintracht finished in sixth place and secured qualification for the Europa League in the following season. Rode made his first appearance in an Europa League game against Qarabağ FK on 22 August 2013. In total, he made five appearances in the Europa League and reached the round of 16 with his team. In February 2014, Rode suffered cartilage damage in his right knee and was ruled out until the end of the season.

=== Bayern Munich ===
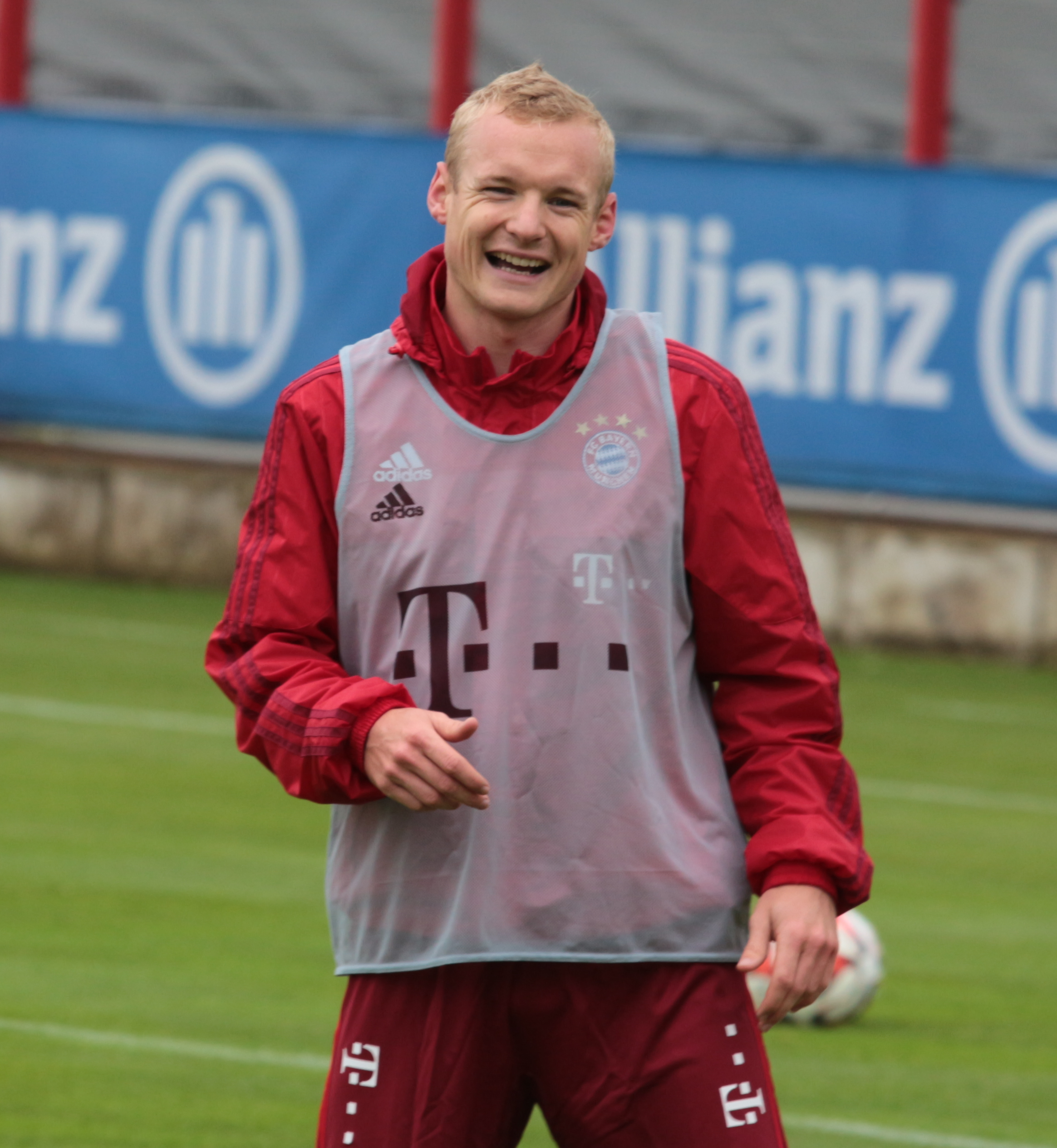
Rode training with Bayern Munich

On 14 April 2014, Rode signed a pre-contract with Bayern Munich to join them effectively on 1 July, at the end of his contract with Frankfurt. He made his debut for Bayern on 13 August 2014 in a 2–0 defeat against Borussia Dortmund in the German Supercup. On 5 November 2014, Rode played in the Champions League for the first time in a 2-0 home win against Roma, coming on as a substitute for David Alaba in the 81st minute. On 22 November 2014, he scored his first goal for Bayern in a 4–0 home win against Hoffenheim, scoring the final goal in the 87th minute. On 10 December 2014, Rode scored a header from a corner kick in a Champions League group stage match against CSKA Moscow, putting Bayern up 2–0 in a match that would end 3–0 with CSKA Moscow being knocked out.

During his time at Bayern, Rode won the Bundesliga title in 2015 and 2016 and the DFB Cup in 2016, but was never able to establish himself as a regular starter.

=== Borussia Dortmund ===
On 6 June 2016, Rode signed a four-year contract with Borussia Dortmund. On 14 August, Rode made his debut in 2–0 defeat against his former team, Bayern Munich in the DFL-Supercup. He scored his first goal for Dortmund on 17 September in a 6-0 win against SV Darmstadt 98. Rode finished his first season at Dortmund reaching third place in the league, with one goal in 21 league matches. He also won the DFB Cup with the team, but did not make an appearance in the tournament.

Rode started the 2017–18 season by losing the German Super Cup against Bayern. After this game, he did not make any Bundesliga or DFB-Pokal appearances during the entire 2017–18 season due to an injury. He returned to the pitch after a one-year break, making two appearances for Borussia Dortmund II in the Regionalliga West during the first half of the 2018–19 Regionalliga season. He subsequently did not make any further competitive appearances for the first team.

=== Return to Eintracht Frankfurt ===
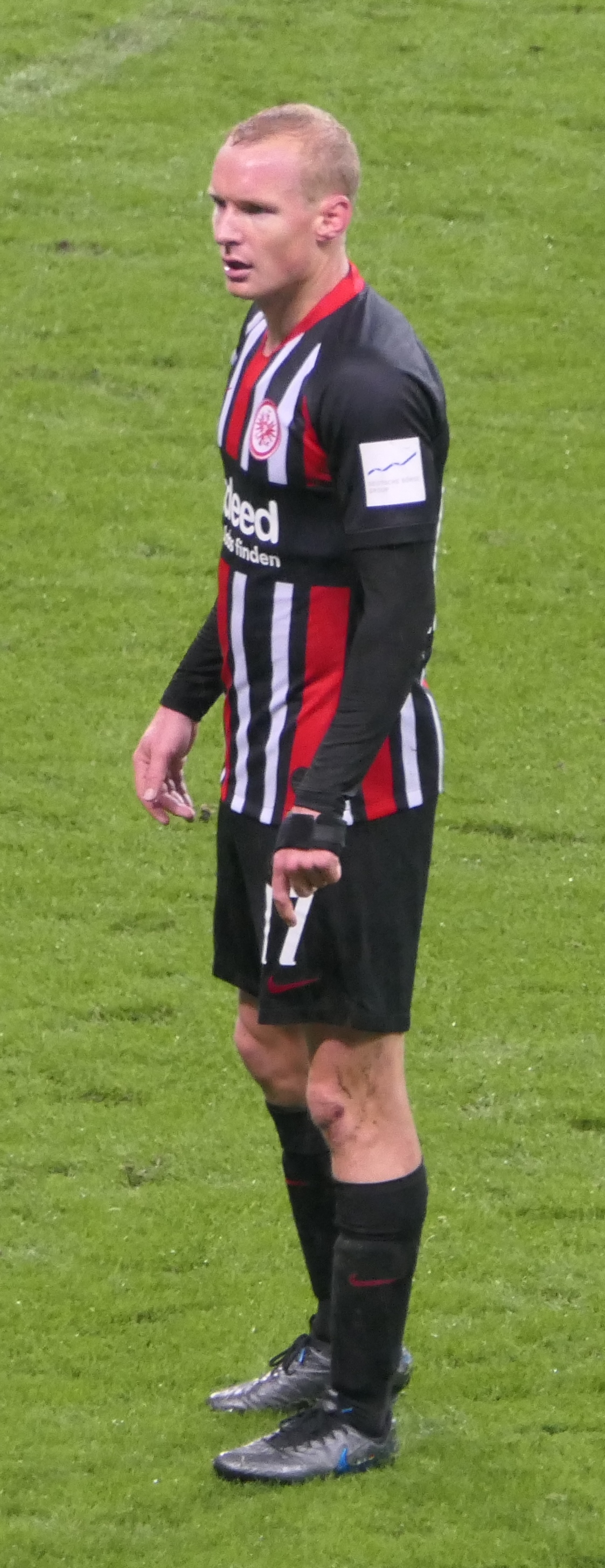
Rode playing for Eintracht Frankfurt in 2019

In the 2018–19 winter transfer window, Rode returned to Eintracht Frankfurt, initially on a loan deal until the end of the season. Under coach Adi Hütter, he was a regular starter in the central midfield and played in 20 competitive matches across all competitions until the end of the season. In the 2018–19 UEFA Europa League campaign, Rode scored the decisive 2-0 goal in the quarter-final second leg against Benfica to help Eintracht reach the semi-finals. There, the team lost to Chelsea on penalties. Rode did not return to Borussia Dortmund at the end of his loan contract, but instead underwent injury-related rehabilitation near Frankfurt.

On 27 July 2019, Rode permanently joined Eintracht Frankfurt on a five-year deal following the successful loan spell. He continued to play in Frankfurt's central midfield in the 2019–20 season, during which he played 43 competitive matches and reached the round of 16 of the 2019–20 UEFA Europa League and the semi-finals of the DFB-Pokal with his club. In the following season, he reached the fifth place in the league with Eintracht.

Prior the start of the 2021–22 season, Rode was named team captain by new head coach Oliver Glasner. Due to knee problems, he missed the first two months of the season and was then slowly reintegrated into the team as a substitute. From December 2021, he played as a starter alongside Djibril Sow in Frankfurt's central midfield. In the 2021–22 UEFA Europa League, he reached the final with Frankfurt after victories against Real Betis, Barcelona and West Ham United. On 18 May 2022, he appeared as a starter in the final against Rangers and won the title with his team on penalties.

In July 2023, Rode announced that he would retire from professional football at the end of the 2023–24 season. After appearing in just seven Bundesliga matches up to matchday 22 due to injuries, he suffered another knee injury in February 2024. He was substituted by coach Dino Toppmöller in the final minutes of the last match of the season against RB Leipzig and was given a farewell at Frankfurt's Waldstadion.

== International career ==
A former German youth international across various ranks, Rode has represented Germany at U18, U19, U20, and U21 level.

== Personal life ==
Rode earned his Abitur in 2010 in the Goethe Gymnasium in Bensheim.

== Career statistics ==
Appearances and goals by club, season and competition
Club	Season	League			DFB-Pokal		Europe		Other		Total	
Club	Season	Division	Apps	Goals	Apps	Goals	Apps	Goals	Apps	Goals	Apps	Goals
Kickers Offenbach	2007–08	2. Bundesliga	0	0	0	0	—		—		0	0
Kickers Offenbach	2008–09	2. Bundesliga	2	0	0	0	—		—		2	0
Kickers Offenbach	2009–10	3. Liga	13	1	0	0	—		—		13	1
Kickers Offenbach	Total		15	1	0	0	—		—		15	1
Eintracht Frankfurt	2010–11	Bundesliga	11	2	0	0	—		—		11	2
Eintracht Frankfurt	2011–12	2. Bundesliga	33	2	2	0	—		—		35	2
Eintracht Frankfurt	2012–13	Bundesliga	33	0	1	0	—		—		34	0
Eintracht Frankfurt	2013–14	Bundesliga	17	0	4	1	7 (Note: Appearances in UEFA Europa League)	0	—		28	1
Eintracht Frankfurt	Total		94	4	7	1	7	0	—		108	5
Bayern Munich	2014–15	Bundesliga	23	2	4	0	7 (Note: Appearances in UEFA Champions League)	1	1 (Note: Appearance in DFL-Supercup)	0	35	3
Bayern Munich	2015–16	Bundesliga	15	1	1	0	1	0	0	0	17	1
Bayern Munich	Total		38	3	5	0	8	1	1	0	52	4
Borussia Dortmund	2016–17	Bundesliga	14	1	2	0	4	0	1	0	21	1
Borussia Dortmund	2017–18	Bundesliga	0	0	0	0	0	0	1	0	1	0
Borussia Dortmund	2018–19	Bundesliga	0	0	0	0	0	0	—		0	0
Borussia Dortmund	Total		14	1	2	0	4	0	2	0	22	1
Borussia Dortmund II	2018–19	Regionalliga West	2	0	—		—		—		2	0
Eintracht Frankfurt (loan)	2018–19	Bundesliga	12	0	0	0	8	1	0	0	20	1
Eintracht Frankfurt	2019–20	Bundesliga	29	3	3	0	11	0	—		43	3
Eintracht Frankfurt	2020–21	Bundesliga	27	1	2	0	—		—		29	1
Eintracht Frankfurt	2021–22	Bundesliga	17	1	1	0	10	0	—		28	1
Eintracht Frankfurt	2022–23	Bundesliga	27	4	5	0	6	0	1 (Note: Appearance in UEFA Super Cup)	0	39	4
Eintracht Frankfurt	2023–24	Bundesliga	8	0	0	0	3 (Note: Appearances in UEFA Europa Conference League)	0	—		11	0
Eintracht Frankfurt	Total		120	9	11	0	38	1	1	0	170	10
Career total			283	18	25	1	57	2	4	0	368	20

== Honours ==
=== Club ===
Bayern Munich

- Bundesliga: 2014–15, 2015–16
- DFB-Pokal: 2015–16

Borussia Dortmund

- DFB-Pokal: 2016–17

Eintracht Frankfurt

- UEFA Europa League: 2021–22
- UEFA Super Cup runner-up: 2022
- DFB-Pokal runner-up: 2022–23
- 2. Bundesliga runner-up: 2011–12
