= Tom Starke =

German footballer (born 1981)

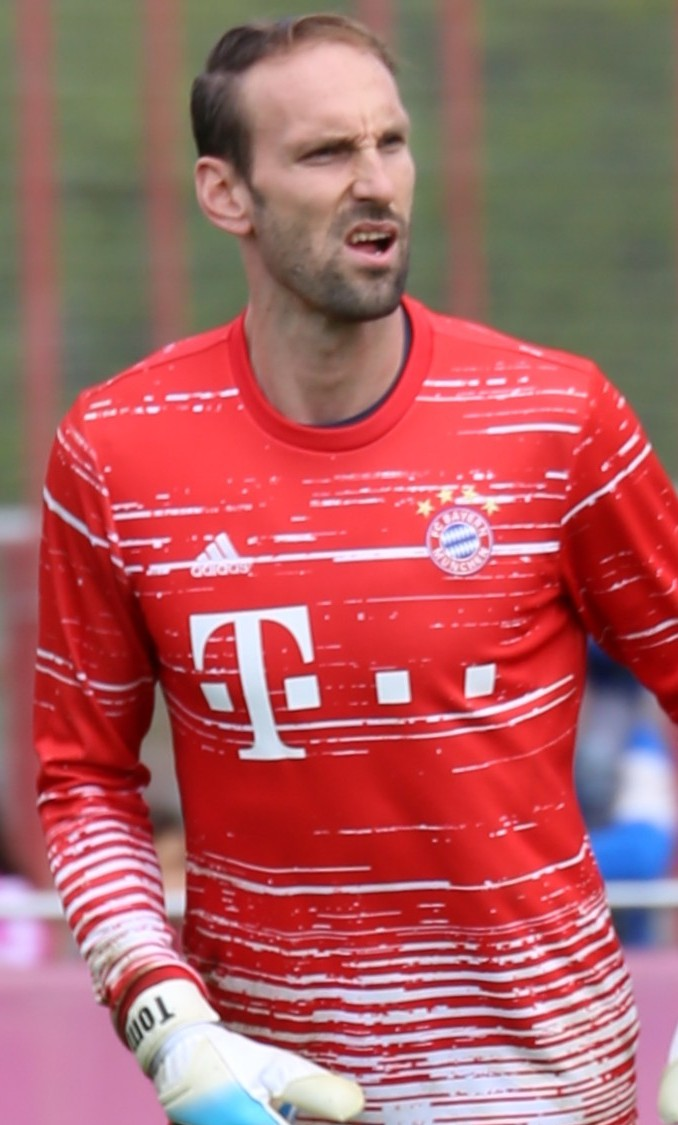
- Starke training for Bayern Munich in 2017

Personal information
- Full name: Tom Peter Starke
- Date of birth: 18 March 1981 (age 45)
- Place of birth: Freital, East Germany
- Height: 1.94 m (6 ft 4 in)
- Position: Goalkeeper

Team information
- Current team: Bayern Munich U19 (goalkeeping coach)

Youth career
- 1988–1989: Stahl Freital
- 1989–1999: Dynamo Dresden

Senior career*
Years	Team	Apps	(Gls)
1999–2006	Bayer Leverkusen II	53	(0)
2000–2006	Bayer Leverkusen	0	(0)
2004	→ Hamburger SV (loan)	2	(0)
2004	→ Hamburger SV II (loan)	2	(0)
2006–2007	Paderborn 07	47	(0)
2007–2010	MSV Duisburg	86	(0)
2010–2012	1899 Hoffenheim	58	(0)
2012–2018	Bayern Munich	10	(0)
2016–2017	Bayern Munich II	2	(0)
Total		260	(0)

International career
2001	Germany U20	4	(0)
2002–2004	Germany U21	12	(0)

Managerial career
- 2015–2017: Bayern Munich Youth (goalkeeping coach)
- 2017–2019: Bayern Munich U19 (goalkeeping coach)
- 2019: Bayern Munich (goalkeeping coach)
- 2019–: Bayern Munich U19 (goalkeeping coach)
- * Club domestic league appearances and goals

Tom Peter Starke (born 18 March 1981) is a German former professional footballer who played as a goalkeeper. He played for six German Bundesliga clubs throughout his career that lasted for 18 seasons. Starke currently works as the goalkeeping coach for German club Bayern Munich U19.

Despite not being a first choice goalkeeper throughout his career at Bayern Munich, Starke was a member of the club's squad, winning six Bundesliga titles, the DFB-Pokal and the UEFA Champions League.

== Club career ==
=== Bayer Leverkusen ===
Born in Freital, East Germany, Starke did not play football at an early age; instead played handball as a goalkeeper. In addition, he also participated as a long-distance runner in the Spartakiad. It was not before August 1988 that Starke began playing football after Stahl Freital were looking for players. He was assigned as a goalkeeper by the club's trainer. He then joined Dynamo Dresden and Bayer Leverkusen.

Starke made his Bayer Leverkusen debut on 25 August 2000, playing the whole game, in a 2–1 loss against St. Pauli in the first round of the DFB-Pokal, which was his only appearance for the club. Although he spent most of the 2000–01 season playing for the reserve side, Starke was called up to the first team, appearing as an unused substitute for the rest of the season. Despite not appearing in the squad for the UEFA Champions League Final against Real Madrid, Starke revealed that he was given a runner–up medal and said: "Maybe it was simplistic political reasons that I never got used." For the rest of his career at Bayer Leverkusen, Starke continued to remain as a cover behind Hans-Jörg Butt, appearing as an unused substitute and at the same time, he appeared regularly for the Bayer Leverkusen II.

In January 2004, Starke was loaned out to Hamburger SV for the rest of the 2003–04 season. After the club's first choice goalkeeper Stefan Wächter suffered an injury, he made his Hamburger SV debut on 13 March 2004 against Hertha BSC and helped the side keep a clean sheet, in a 2–0 win. Two months later on 1 May 2004, Starke made his second appearance for Hamburger SV, as they lost 6–0 against Werder Bremen. After the match, Uli Hoeneß criticised his performance. This also cost him a chance to be in the Germany U21 squad for the UEFA European Under-21 Championship. By the time he left the club at the end of the 2003–04 season, Starke made two appearances for Hamburger SV.

=== Paderborn 07 ===
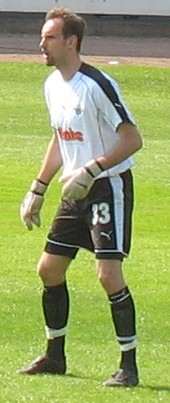
Starke playing for Paderborn 07 in 2006

It was announced that Starke joined Paderborn 07 on 6 January 2006, signing a two–year contract, with Bayer Leverkusen including a buyback clause.

Starke made his Paderborn 07 debut, playing the whole game, in a 1–1 draw against SpVgg Unterhaching on 20 January 2006. He then helped the side keeping four clean sheets in the next four matches. Stark quickly became the first choice goalkeeper for the side and made an impression. He was booked once for giving away a penalty during a match against Alemannia Aachen on 21 April 2006, in which he failed to save a penalty despite winning 3–1. At the end of the 2005–06 season, Starke had made seventeen appearances in all competitions.

Starke started the 2006–07 season well when he kept a clean sheet in the first two league matches against Eintracht Braunschweig and FC Augsburg. Starke continued to be a first choice goalkeeper for the side for most of the 2006–07 season. Since the start of the season, Starke started in every match as a first choice goalkeeper until he suffered a knee injury that saw him miss three matches. Starke returned on 11 March 2007 to the starting line–up and played the whole game in a 3–2 win against Rot-Weiss Essen. He later regained his first choice goalkeeper role for the rest of the 2006–07 season. In that season, Starke made thirty-two appearances in all competitions.

=== MSV Duisburg ===
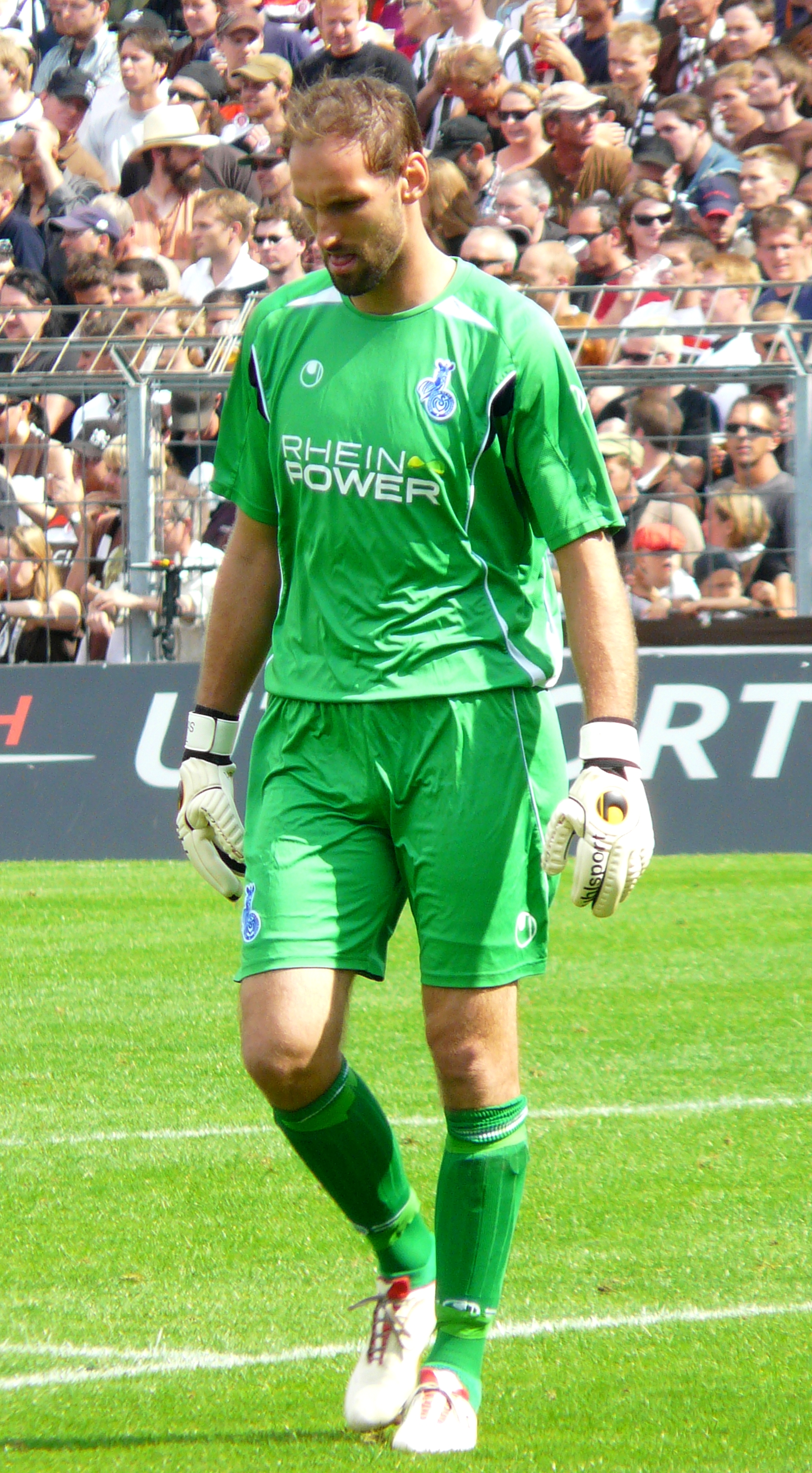
Starke with MSV Duisburg, 2009

It was announced on 1 June 2007 that Starke joined MSV Duisburg.

Starke made his MSV Duisburg debut, in a 4–0 win against SV Babelsberg 03 in the first round of the DFB-Pokal. Seven days later on 12 August 2007, he made his league debut for the club, in a 3–1 win against Borussia Dortmund in the opening game of the season. Starke quickly became first choice goalkeeper. In the next two matches against 1. FC Nürnberg and FC Bayern Munich he kept two clean sheets. Starke started in every match since the beginning of the 2007–08 season until he suffered a foot injury that kept him out for a month. On 23 February 2008, Starke returned to the starting line–up and helped the side keep a clean sheet, in a 2–0 win against Arminia Bielefeld. Since returning from injury, he regained his place as the club's first choice goalkeeper for the rest of the season. However, Starke was unable to help the club avoid relegation after losing 3–2 against Bayern Munich on 10 May 2008. In his first season at MSV Duisburg, Starke went on to make thirty–three appearances in all competitions.

In the 2008–09 season, Starke featured for the first four league matches before fracturing his thumb that kept him sidelined for a month. Despite returning from injury, he lost his first team place to Marcel Herzog for the next six matches. But Starke made his return to the starting line–up and helped the side keep a clean sheet in a 0–0 draw against FSV Frankfurt on 21 November 2008. This was followed up by keeping two more clean sheets in the next two matches. After he returned from injury, he regained his first team place as a first choice goalkeeper for the rest of the season. Starke, once again, helped the side keep three consecutive clean sheets between 24 April 2009 and 8 May 2009. He was fined 3,000 euros and missed the last game of the season by the German Football Association for displaying a gesture to referee Peter Sippel during a 5–3 win against 1. FC Kaiserslautern. Despite this, Starke made twenty-five appearances in all competitions in the 2008–09 season.

In the opening game of the 2009–10 season, Starke was given the captaincy in absence of Björn Schlicke in a 2–1 win against FSV Frankfurt. Starke started in every match since the beginning of the season until he suffered a strained abdominal in a warm up match against SpVgg Greuther Fürth that saw him missing two matches. On 6 December 2009, he made his return to the starting line-up against Paderborn 07, as they won 3–1. It was announced on 8 January 2010 that Starke was given a captaincy to succeed Björn Schlicke. Starke regained his first team place as the first choice goalkeeper for the rest of the 2009–10 season. For his performance, Starke was voted the club's player of the season. During his time at MSV Duisburg, he was a fan favourite among supporters.

=== 1899 Hoffenheim ===
Starke's performance in Duisburg attracted interest from Bundesliga clubs, leading to speculation that he would leave Duisburg. On 30 April 2010, it was announced that Starke joined 1899 Hoffenheim, signing a three-year contract.

Starke made his 1899 Hoffenheim debut in a 4–1 win against Hansa Rostock in the first round of the DFB.Pokal. He later started the next three matches for the side before suffering a calf injury that saw him missing two matches. On 23 September 2010, Starke returned to the first team in a 1–1 draw against 1. FC Köln. He then appeared in the next five matches before suffering a torn muscle that kept him out for months. On 15 January 2011, Starke returned to the starting line–up in a 2–1 loss against Werder Bremen. After his injury he regained his first team place as the club's first choice goalkeeper and quickly made an impression for the side. Starke then captained the side for the first time in his career against Eintracht Frankfurt on 16 April 2011 and kept a clean sheet as TSG 1899 Hoffenheim won 1–0. In his first season at the club, he made twenty-eight appearances in all competitions. For his performance, Starke was nominated for the club's Player of the Year award but lost out to Gylfi Sigurðsson.

At the start of the 2011–12 season, Starke as TSG 1899 Hoffenheim's first choice goalkeeper. He then kept two consecutive clean sheets in the next two matches against Borussia Dortmund and FC Augsburg. Starke started in every match until he suffered a concussion in mid–October which caused him missing one match. In the match against 1. FC Kaiserslautern, he captained the side for the first time in the 2011–12 season, helping the side to 1–1 draw. His second match as captain then came on 10 March 2012, in a 7–1 loss against Bayern Munich. In his second season at the club, he went on to make thirty-six appearances in all competitions.

=== Bayern Munich ===
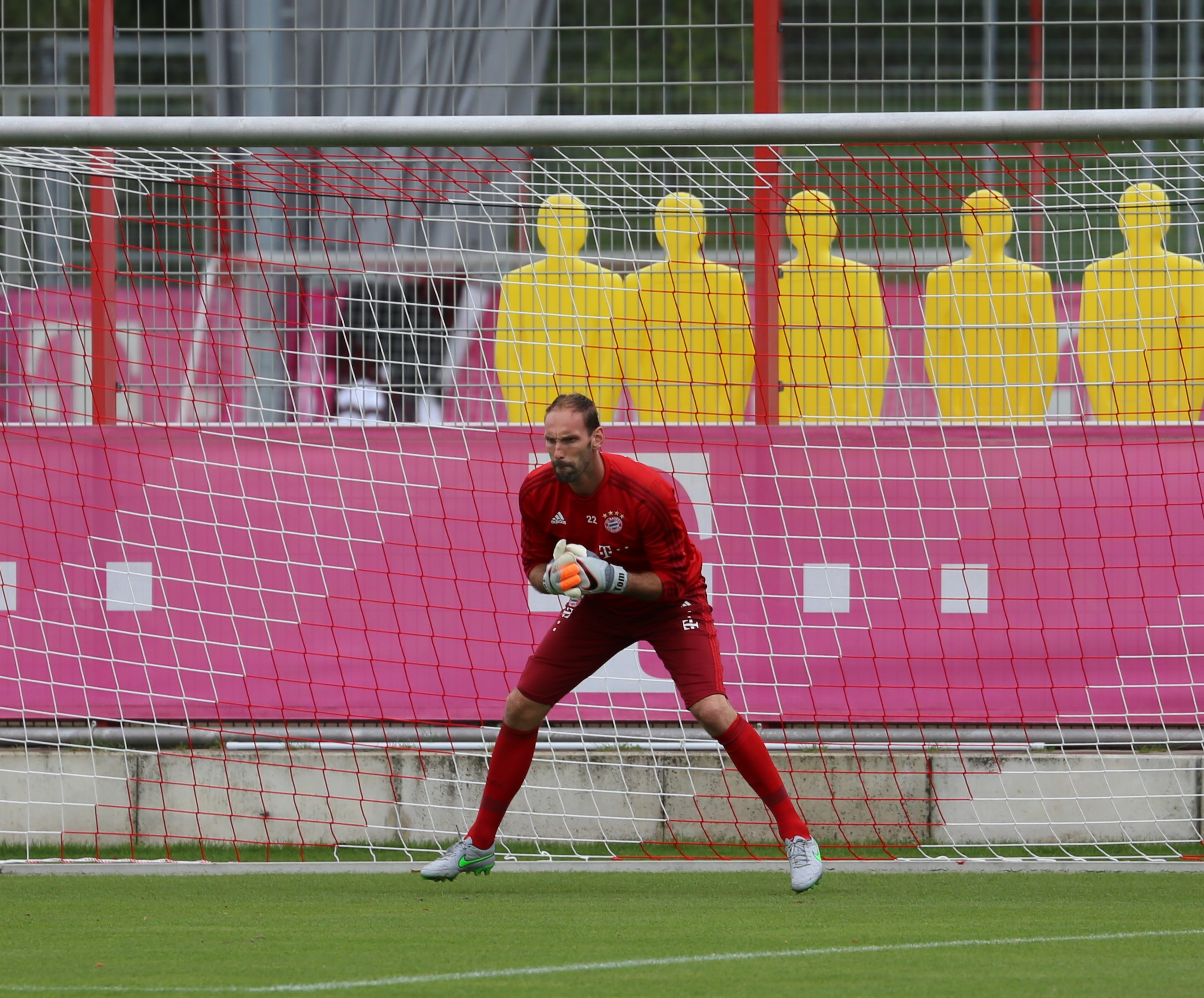
Starke during training at Bayern Munich in 2015

It was announced on 16 May 2012 that Starke was signed by Bayern Munich on a three-year contract. It came after when TSG 1899 Hoffenheim signed Tim Wiese. Upon leaving TSG 1899 Hoffenheim, he made a statement, thanking both the club and supporters.

However, Starke became a second choice goalkeeper for Bayern Munich behind Manuel Neuer and appeared on the substitute bench for most of the 2012–13 season He made his first appearance for the club on 31 October 2012 during a DFB-Pokal match against 1. FC Kaiserslautern without conceding any goals. Starke's Bundesliga debut for Bayern Munich came in a 1–0 away win at his previous team TSG 1899 Hoffenheim on 3 March 2013, and on his second Bundesliga appearance, in a match against 1. FC Nürnberg on 13 April, he saved a penalty from Timmy Simons with his face. Starke’s fourth appearance for the club came against SC Freiburg on 27 April 2013, keeping a clean sheet, as they won 1–0, breaking a Bundesliga record with 84 points (which they eventually finished the season with 91). In his first season at Bayern Munich, he was a member of Bayern Munich squad that won the Bundesliga, Champions League and DFB-Pokal. At the end of the 2012–13 season, Starke went on to make four appearances in all competitions.

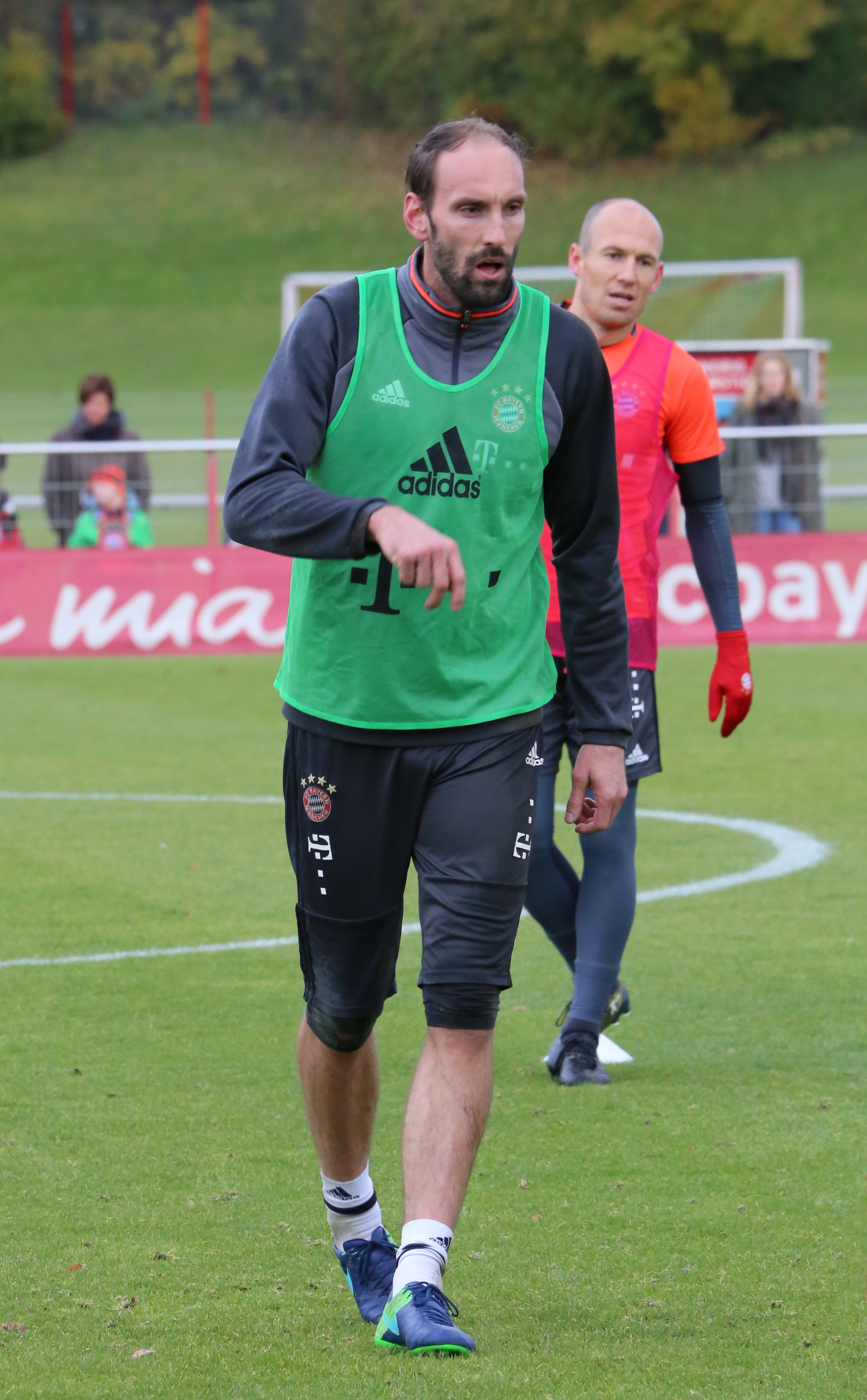
Starke during training at Bayern Munich in 2016

At the start of the 2013–14 season, Starke made his first appearance of the season against Borussia Dortmund in the DFL-Supercup, where he conceded four goals, in a 4–2 defeat. Starke continued to be a second choice goalkeeper for the side behind Neuer for most of the 2013–14 season. On 23 February 2014, he made his first appearance of the season, in a 4–0 win against Hannover 96. A month later on 29 March 2014, Starke made his third appearance of the season and conceded three goals, as Bayern Munich drew 3–3 against his former club, TSG 1899 Hoffenheim. However, he suffered an elbow injury during training that kept him out for the rest of the 2013–14 season. Despite this, Starke was a member of Bayern Munich squad that won the Bundesliga, FIFA Club World Cup, UEFA Super Cup and DFB-Pokal. In his second season at Bayern Munich, he went on to make three appearances in all competitions.

For the next three seasons at Bayern Munich, Starke became a third choice goalkeeper following an arrival of Pepe Reina and Sven Ulreich. Despite this, it was announced on 17 December 2014 that Starke signed a contract with the club, keeping him until 2016. The next two years saw Starke appointed as a goalkeeper coach for the club’s junior side. He also signed a contract extension with the club at the end of the 2015–16 season.

On 6 May 2017 when Starke played for Bayern Munich for the first time in three years, helping the side keep a clean sheet, in a 1–0 win against Darmstadt 98. In a follow–up match, he made his second appearance for Bayern Munich, in a 5–4 win against RB Leipzig. Starke announced his retirement on 17 May 2017 and played his final official match on 20 May, in a 4–1 win for FC Bayern Munich against SC Freiburg. Despite making three appearances in the 2016–17 season, he, nevertheless, was a member of Bayern Munich squad that won the Bundesliga.

Shortly after, Starke was signed by Bayern as goalkeeping coach coordinator. Due to the injury of Manuel Neuer, Starke was called back to play for Bayern Munich in the pre-season matches of the 2017–18 season. He was called to be in Bayern's UEFA Champions League squad in September 2017. Starke made his return with some fine saves in a 1–0 victory over Eintracht Frankfurt on 10 December 2017. In a follow–up match against 1. FC Köln, he made his second appearance for the side, keeping another clean sheet, in a 1–0 win. Starke spent the rest of the 2017–18 season as a second choice goalkeeper behind Ulreich, as the club won the league once again.

At the end of the 2017–18 season, Starke retired from professional football for good and went back to his job at the FC Bayern Campus as the goalkeeper coordinator for Bayern's youth teams. In December 2018, it was announced that he was appointed as the club’s assistant goalkeeper coach to Toni Tapalović.

== International career ==
Starke represented the Germany youth levels. From 2002 to 2004, he was called up to the Germany U21 squad.

== Career statistics ==
Appearances and goals by club, season and competition
Club	Season	League			Cup (Note: Includes DFB-Pokal)		Continental		Other		Total		Ref.
Club	Season	Division	Apps	Goals	Apps	Goals	Apps	Goals	Apps	Goals	Apps	Goals	Ref.
Bayer Leverkusen II	2000–01	Regionalliga Nord	0	0	1	0	—		—		1	0	
Bayer Leverkusen II	2001–02	Regionalliga Nord	20	0	—		—		—		20	0	
Bayer Leverkusen II	2002–03	Regionalliga Nord	22	0	—		—		—		22	0	
Bayer Leverkusen II	2003–04	Regionalliga Nord	0	0	1	0	—		—		1	0	
Bayer Leverkusen II	2005–06	Regionalliga Nord	5	0	—		—		—		5	0	
Bayer Leverkusen II	Total		47	0	2	0	—		—		49	0	—
Bayer Leverkusen	2000–01	Bundesliga	0	0	0	0	0	0	0	0	0	0	
Bayer Leverkusen	2001–02	Bundesliga	0	0	0	0	0	0	0	0	0	0	
Bayer Leverkusen	2002–03	Bundesliga	0	0	0	0	0	0	0	0	0	0	
Bayer Leverkusen	2003–04	Bundesliga	0	0	0	0	—		0	0	0	0	
Bayer Leverkusen	2004–05	Bundesliga	0	0	0	0	0	0	1	0	1	0	
Bayer Leverkusen	Total		0	0	0	0	0	0	1	0	1	0	—
Hamburger SV (loan)	2003–04	Bundesliga	2	0	0	0	0	0	0	0	2	0	
Hamburger SV II (loan)	2003–04	Regionalliga Nord	2	0	—		—		—		2	0	
Paderborn	2005–06	2. Bundesliga	17	0	0	0	—		—		17	0	
Paderborn	2006–07	2. Bundesliga	30	0	2	0	—		—		32	0	
Paderborn	Total		47	0	2	0	—		—		49	0	—
MSV Duisburg	2007–08	Bundesliga	31	0	2	0	—		—		33	0	
MSV Duisburg	2008–09	2. Bundesliga	24	0	1	0	—		—		25	0	
MSV Duisburg	2009–10	2. Bundesliga	31	0	3	0	—		—		34	0	
MSV Duisburg	Total		86	0	6	0	—		—		92	0	—
1899 Hoffenheim	2010–11	Bundesliga	25	0	3	0	—		—		28	0	
1899 Hoffenheim	2011–12	Bundesliga	33	0	3	0	—		—		36	0	
1899 Hoffenheim	Total		58	0	6	0	—		—		64	0	—
Bayern Munich	2012–13	Bundesliga	3	0	1	0	0	0	0	0	4	0	
Bayern Munich	2013–14	Bundesliga	2	0	0	0	0	0	1	0	3	0	
Bayern Munich	2014–15	Bundesliga	0	0	0	0	0	0	0	0	0	0	
Bayern Munich	2015–16	Bundesliga	0	0	0	0	0	0	0	0	0	0	
Bayern Munich	2016–17	Bundesliga	3	0	0	0	0	0	0	0	3	0	
Bayern Munich	2017–18	Bundesliga	2	0	0	0	0	0	0	0	2	0	
Bayern Munich	Total		10	0	1	0	0	0	1	0	12	0	–
Career total			252	0	17	0	0	0	2	0	271	0	–

== Personal life ==
Starke is married and has two children. He comes from a sporting family.

Starke's younger brother, Manuel, is a footballer who plays in a midfield position.

== Honours ==
Bayern Munich

- Bundesliga: 2012–13, 2013–14, 2014–15, 2015–16, 2016–17, 2017–18
- DFB-Pokal: 2012–13, 2013–14, 2015–16
- DFL-Supercup: 2012, 2016
- UEFA Champions League: 2012–13
- UEFA Super Cup: 2013
- FIFA Club World Cup: 2013
