= Jamal Kaishvili =

Georgian footballer (born 2008)

Jamal Kaishvili ჯამალ კაიშვილი
Personal information
- Date of birth: 13 May 2008 (age 18)
- Place of birth: Grozny, Russia
- Height: 1.79 m (5 ft 10 in)
- Positions: Winger; attacking midfielder

Youth career
- –2017: FC Erding
- 2017–2026: Bayern Munich
- 2025: → Türkgücü München (loan)

International career^{‡}
Years	Team	Apps	(Gls)
2025–	Georgia U19	1	(0)
- ‡ National team caps and goals as of 9 September 2025

Jamal Kaishvili (Georgian: ჯამალ კაიშვილი; Russian: Джамал Каишвили; born 13 May 2008) is a footballer who plays as a winger and attacking midfielder. Born in Russia, he is a Georgia youth international.

== Early life ==
Kaishvili was born on 13 May 2008, in Grozny, Russia, to a Georgian mother and a Russian father. Growing up, he played futsal and regarded Portugal international Cristiano Ronaldo as his football idol.

== Club career ==
As a youth player, Kaishvili joined the youth academy of German side FC Erding. Following his stint there, he joined the youth academy of German Bundesliga side Bayern Munich ahead of the 2017–18 season. During the summer of 2025, he joined the youth academy of German side Türkgücü München on a six-month loan spell.

== International career ==
Born in Russia, Kaishvili holds Georgian citizenship. He has represented Georgia at the under-19 level since 2025.
