= Niklas Süle =

German footballer (born 1995)

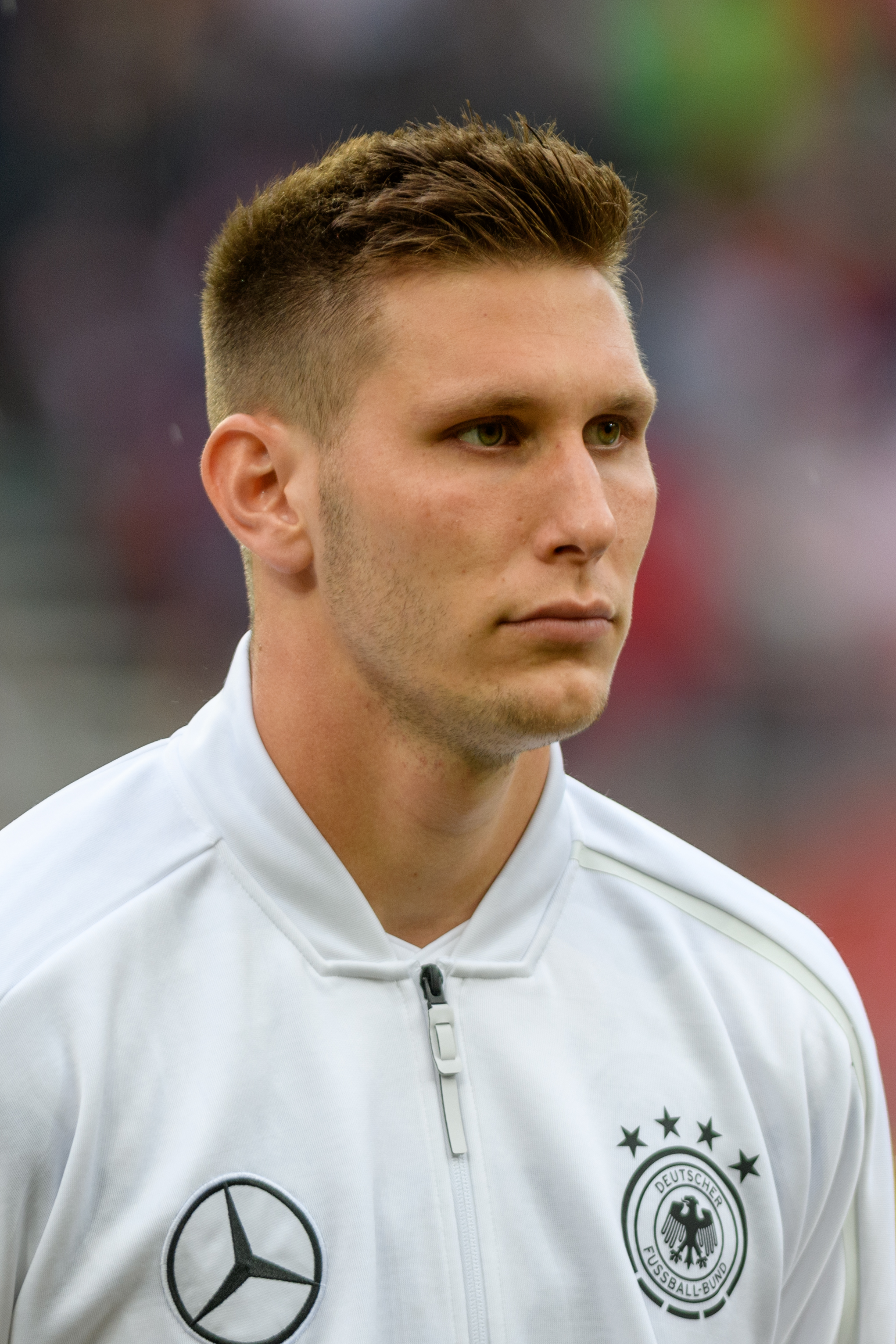
- Süle with Germany in 2018

Personal information
- Full name: Niklas Süle
- Date of birth: 3 September 1995 (age 31)
- Place of birth: Frankfurt, Germany
- Height: 1.95 m (6 ft 5 in)
- Position: Centre-back

Team information
- Current team: SV Tiefenbach
- Number: 25

Youth career
- 2004–2006: Rot-Weiß Walldorf
- 2006–2009: Eintracht Frankfurt
- 2009–2010: Darmstadt 98
- 2010–2012: TSG Hoffenheim

Senior career*
Years	Team	Apps	(Gls)
2012–2013	TSG Hoffenheim II	6	(0)
2013–2017	TSG Hoffenheim	108	(7)
2017–2022	Bayern Munich	114	(6)
2022–2026	Borussia Dortmund	78	(3)
2026–	SV Tiefenbach	1	(1)

International career
2010–2011	Germany U16	10	(2)
2011–2012	Germany U17	17	(3)
2012–2013	Germany U18	4	(0)
2013	Germany U19	3	(0)
2014–2016	Germany U21	15	(1)
2016	Germany U23	6	(0)
2016–2023	Germany	49	(1)
Medal record
Representing Germany
FIFA Confederations Cup
Winner	2017
Summer Olympic Games
Silver medal – second place	2016	Team
- * Club domestic league appearances and goals

Niklas Süle (German pronunciation: [ˈnɪklas ˈzyːlə]; born 3 September 1995) is a German footballer who plays as a centre-back or forward for Kreisliga Sinsheim club SV Tiefenbach.

Süle started his career at TSG Hoffenheim before joining Bayern Munich in 2017, where he won five Bundesligas, two DFB-Pokal and four DFL-Supercup titles in addition to one each of UEFA Champions League, UEFA Super Cup and FIFA Club World Cup. He later signed for Borussia Dortmund in 2022. At international level, he represented Germany, for which he won the 2017 FIFA Confederations Cup and played in two FIFA World Cups in 2018 and 2022.

== Club career ==
=== Early career ===
Süle started his career with Rot-Weiß Walldorf. In July 2006, he signed for the youth team of Eintracht Frankfurt, where he played until the end of the 2008–09 season. In July 2009, he signed for the youth team of Darmstadt 98, and only half a year later he left for the youth team at TSG Hoffenheim.

=== 1899 Hoffenheim ===
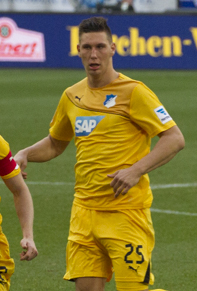
Süle with Hoffenheim in 2014

On 11 May 2013, Süle made his debut for Hoffenheim in a Bundesliga game against Hamburger SV. He started the match but was substituted for Andreas Ludwig in the 81st minute. Hoffenheim lost the game 4–1. During the 2012–13 season, Süle made two Bundesliga appearances and two relegation playoff appearances as Hoffenheim defeated 1. FC Kaiserslautern to stay in the Bundesliga.

During the 2013–14 season Süle established himself as an important first team player for Hoffenheim. Süle played in 25 Bundesliga matches and scored four goals as he helped Hoffenheim finish 9th in the league.

Süle started the 2014–15 season strong and played every minute during the first 14 Bundesliga matches. On 12 December 2014, Süle suffered a torn anterior cruciate ligament during matchday 15 against Frankfurt. Süle was sidelined for the rest of the season due to the injury. Hoffenheim finished 8th in the league.

Süle returned for the 2015–16 season after the ACL tear. He played every minute in 33 Bundesliga matches as Hoffenheim finished a disappointing 15th in the league.

Süle had a very impressive 2016–17 season for Hoffenheim as he played in 33 Bundesliga matches. Hoffenheim finished in an impressive 4th in the Bundesliga. Süle's performance drew interest from clubs like Bayern Munich and Chelsea.

On 15 January 2017, Bayern Munich had announced that they had signed Süle along with Sebastian Rudy from Hoffenheim as a double swoop. Both Süle and Rudy joined Bayern Munich on 1 July 2017.

=== Bayern Munich ===
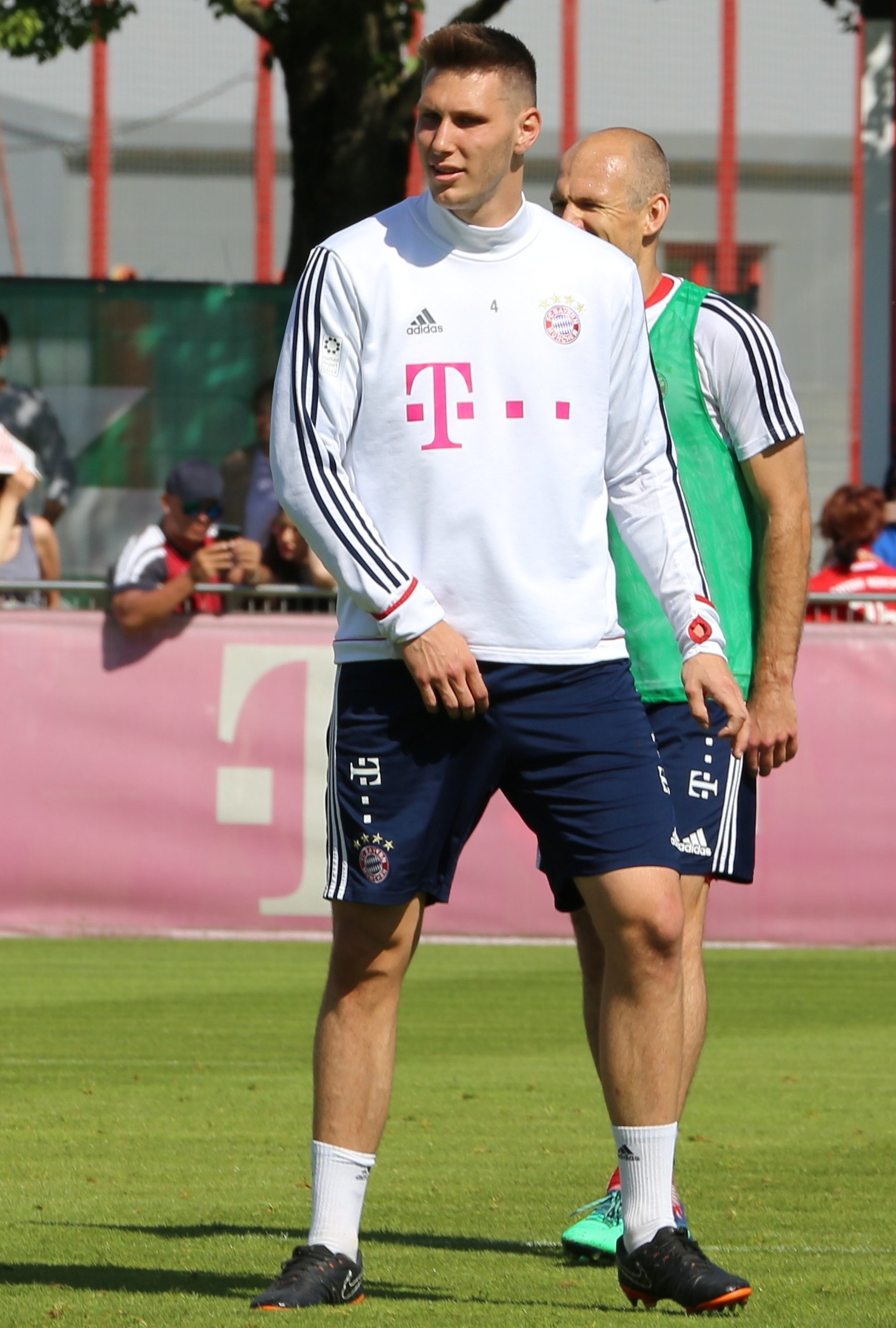
Süle training with Bayern in 2018

Süle's first appearance came as he was named a starter for Bayern Munich's season opener against Bayer 04 Leverkusen on 18 August 2017. He scored the first goal of the 2017–18 Bundesliga season, heading in a free kick from fellow Bayern newcomer and Hoffenheim-product Sebastian Rudy. On 12 September 2017, Süle made his Champions League debut against Anderlecht. Süle played in 27 Bundesliga matches and scored two goals. He made nine appearances in the Champions League during the season.

Süle won his first Bundesliga title after Bayern Munich finished 21 points ahead of second-placed Schalke 04. Süle also reached his first DFB-Pokal final as Bayern Munich were beaten 3–1 by Süle's former youth club, Eintracht Frankfurt.

Süle started the 2018–19 season by playing in the 2018 German Super Cup, which Bayern won 5–0. On 20 April 2019, Süle scored the winning goal in a 1–0 win over Werder Bremen. The win kept Bayern at the top of the Bundesliga table.

On 18 May 2019, Süle won his second Bundesliga title as Bayern finished with 78 points, two points above Dortmund. A week later, Süle won his first DFB-Pokal as Bayern defeated RB Leipzig 3–0 in the 2019 DFB-Pokal Final. He played in 31 Bundesliga matches and scored two goals. During the Bundesliga season, Süle had a 95 percent pass completion while having the fourth most touches of any Bundesliga player. Süle appeared in 42 matches in all competitions and scored two goals.

Süle tore his anterior cruciate ligament in the 12th minute of the team's eighth league match of the 2019–20 season and was expected to be out of the line-up for eight to ten months, preventing him from participating with Germany for UEFA Euro 2020, before the tournament was postponed. On 8 August 2020, Süle played against Chelsea in the Champions League, marking his first match since October 2019. He then started from the bench in the later games in the Champions League. On 23 August 2020, Süle came on from the bench in the 2020 UEFA Champions League Final and replaced Jérôme Boateng after he suffered an early injury. He won the Champions League, completing the continental treble for that season.

On 9 December 2020, Süle scored his first Champions League goal in a 2–0 win over Lokomotiv Moscow.

=== Borussia Dortmund ===
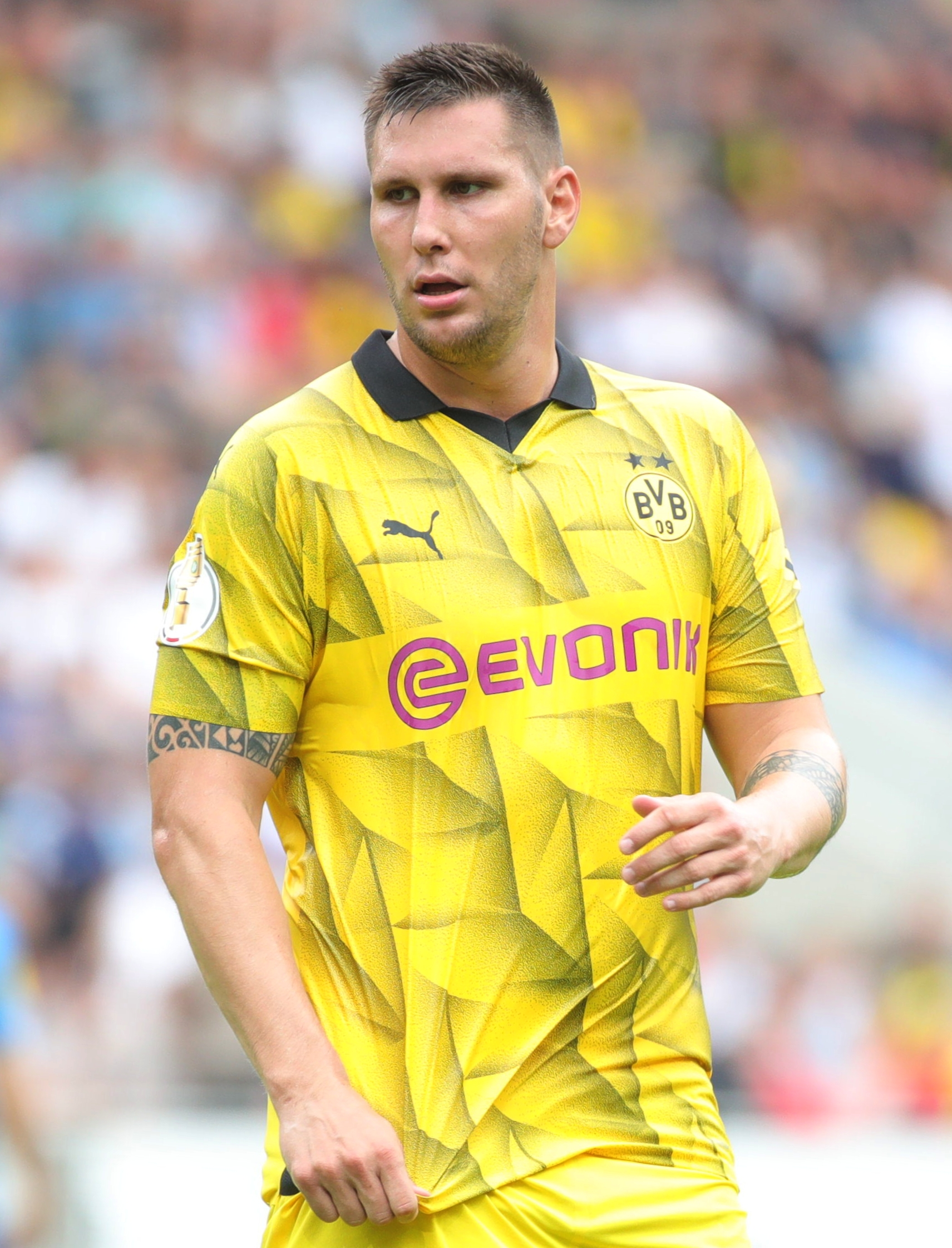
Süle playing for Dortmund in 2023

Süle agreed to join Borussia Dortmund starting from the 2022–23 season on a free transfer on a four-year contract. On 22 October 2022, he recorded his first goal and assist for the club in a 5–0 win over Stuttgart.

On 7 May 2026, Süle announced his retirement from professional football by the end of the 2025–26 season, due to almost suffering a third ACL injury. Despite his injury, he was subbed on in a 3–2 victory over hometown club Eintracht Frankfurt in the 88th minute a day after his announcement, to complete a feat of 300 Bundesliga matches, which was his wish and his final match.

=== SV Tiefenbach ===
On 5 July 2026, Süle partially came out of retirement to join amateur side SV Tiefenbach|Tiefenbach in the Kreisliga. Despite being a defender for all of his professional career, Niklas made his debut for Tiefenbach as a striker, scoring in a 7–2 loss against SG Kirchardt.

== International career ==
Süle participated in the 2012 UEFA European Under-17 Championship with the German U17 team. He was part of the squad for the 2016 Summer Olympics, where Germany won the silver medal.

Süle was called up in August 2016 when the Germany national team played Finland and Norway. He was brought off in the 59th minute against the former.

Süle was named in Germany's final 23-man squad by Joachim Löw for the 2018 FIFA World Cup. On 27 June, Süle made his first World Cup appearance in the last match of the group stage in a 2–0 defeat to South Korea, as Germany got knocked out of the World Cup in the first round for the first time since 1938. On 19 May 2021, he was selected for the UEFA Euro 2020 squad. On 10 November 2022, he was called up for the 2022 FIFA World Cup in Qatar.

His 49th and last match for Germany was on 18 October 2023, a 2–2 friendly draw over Mexico. His only goal came in the November 2018 international friendly against Russia.

== Personal life ==
Süle was born in Frankfurt, Hesse. His grandfather György emigrated with his wife from Budapest to Germany. His father Georg worked as a coach at Rot-Weiss Walldorf; meanwhile, his elder brother, Fabian, had a football scholarship at the St. Francis College in New York to study Business Management, Economics and Finance. His family name is of Hungarian origin, but the manager of the Turkish Football Federation under-16 national team contacted Süle during his teenage years about the possibility of playing for them as Süle's surname seemed Turkish to him. He was also eligible for the Hungary national team, since he holds Hungarian citizenship.

Süle is also active as an entrepreneur outside of football. In 2021, he co-founded the mobile sports game studio games & leaves. Additionally, he is a co-founder of the spirits brand German Giant Gin, a venture he started alongside his brother Fabian and Nabal Araya.

Süle had a son in late 2020 with his girlfriend Melissa Halter.

== Career statistics ==
=== Club ===
Appearances and goals by club, season and competition
Club	Season	League			DFB-Pokal		Europe		Other		Total	
Club	Season	Division	Apps	Goals	Apps	Goals	Apps	Goals	Apps	Goals	Apps	Goals
TSG Hoffenheim II	2012–13	Regionalliga Südwest	4	0	—		—		—		4	0
TSG Hoffenheim II	2013–14	Regionalliga Südwest	2	0	—		—		—		2	0
TSG Hoffenheim II	Total		6	0	—		—		—		6	0
TSG Hoffenheim	2012–13	Bundesliga	2	0	0	0	—		2 (Note: Appearances in Bundesliga relegation play-offs)	0	5	0
TSG Hoffenheim	2013–14	Bundesliga	25	4	3	1	—		—		28	5
TSG Hoffenheim	2014–15	Bundesliga	15	1	2	0	—		—		17	1
TSG Hoffenheim	2015–16	Bundesliga	33	0	1	0	—		—		34	0
TSG Hoffenheim	2016–17	Bundesliga	33	2	1	0	—		—		34	2
TSG Hoffenheim	Total		108	7	7	1	—		2	0	117	8
Bayern Munich	2017–18	Bundesliga	27	2	5	0	9 (Note: Appearance(s) in UEFA Champions League)	0	1 (Note: Appearance in DFL-Supercup)	0	42	2
Bayern Munich	2018–19	Bundesliga	31	2	4	0	6	0	1	0	42	2
Bayern Munich	2019–20	Bundesliga	8	0	1	0	6	0	1	0	16	0
Bayern Munich	2020–21	Bundesliga	20	1	2	0	7	1	4 (Note: One appearance in DFL-Supercup, one appearance in UEFA Super Cup, two appearances in FIFA Club World Cup)	0	33	2
Bayern Munich	2021–22	Bundesliga	28	1	2	0	7	0	1	0	38	1
Bayern Munich	Total		114	6	14	0	35	1	8	0	171	7
Borussia Dortmund	2022–23	Bundesliga	29	2	4	0	8	0	—		41	2
Borussia Dortmund	2023–24	Bundesliga	23	1	2	0	6	0	—		31	1
Borussia Dortmund	2024–25	Bundesliga	15	0	1	0	5	0	4 (Note: Appearances in FIFA Club World Cup)	0	25	0
Borussia Dortmund	2025–26	Bundesliga	11	0	1	0	1	0	—		13	0
Borussia Dortmund	Total		78	3	8	0	20	0	4	0	110	3
Career total			306	16	29	1	55	1	14	0	404	18

=== International ===
Appearances and goals by national team and year
National team	Year	Apps	Goals
Germany	2016	1	0
Germany	2017	7	0
Germany	2018	8	1
Germany	2019	8	0
Germany	2020	5	0
Germany	2021	8	0
Germany	2022	8	0
Germany	2023	4	0
Total		49	1

Scores and results list Germany's goal tally first.

List of international goals scored by Niklas Süle
No.	Date	Venue	Opponent	Score	Result	Competition
1	15 November 2018	Red Bull Arena, Leipzig, Germany	Russia	2–0	3–0	Friendly

== Honours ==
Bayern Munich

- Bundesliga: 2017–18, 2018–19, 2019–20, 2020–21, 2021–22
- DFB-Pokal: 2018–19, 2019–20
- DFL-Supercup: 2017, 2018, 2020, 2021
- UEFA Champions League: 2019–20
- UEFA Super Cup: 2020
- FIFA Club World Cup: 2020

Borussia Dortmund

- UEFA Champions League runner-up: 2023–24

Germany U23

- Olympic Silver Medal: 2016

Germany

- FIFA Confederations Cup: 2017

Individual

- UEFA Champions League Breakthrough XI: 2017
- Bundesliga Team of the Season: 2016–17
- kicker Bundesliga Team of the Season: 2021–22
