= Sven Ulreich =

German footballer (born 1988)

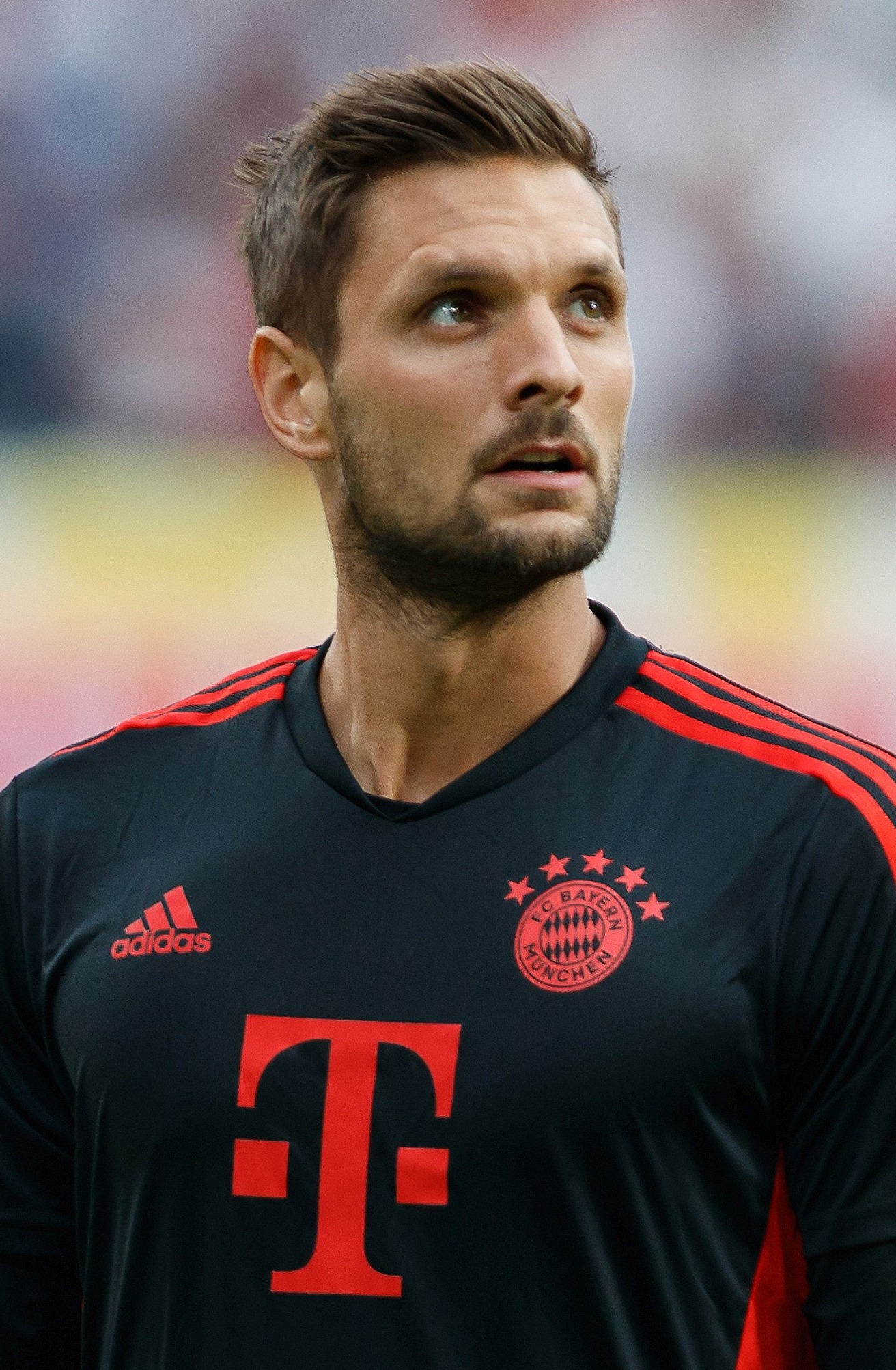
- Ulreich with Bayern Munich in 2022

Personal information
- Date of birth: 3 August 1988 (age 38)
- Place of birth: Schorndorf, West Germany
- Height: 1.92 m (6 ft 4 in)
- Position: Goalkeeper

Team information
- Current team: Bayern Munich
- Number: 26

Youth career
- 1993–1994: TSV Lichtenwald
- 1994–1998: TSV Schornbach
- 1998–2007: VfB Stuttgart

Senior career*
Years	Team	Apps	(Gls)
2007–2009	VfB Stuttgart II	73	(0)
2008–2015	VfB Stuttgart	176	(0)
2015–2020	Bayern Munich	45	(0)
2020–2021	Hamburger SV	32	(0)
2021–	Bayern Munich	22	(0)

International career^{‡}
2003–2004	Germany U16	2	(0)
2007	Germany U19	3	(0)
2009–2010	Germany U21	3	(0)
- * Club domestic league appearances and goals as of 16:30, 14 March 2026 (UTC) ‡ National team caps and goals as of 12 August 2010

Sven Ulreich (born 3 August 1988) is a German professional footballer who plays as a goalkeeper for Bundesliga club Bayern Munich.

== Club career ==
=== VfB Stuttgart ===
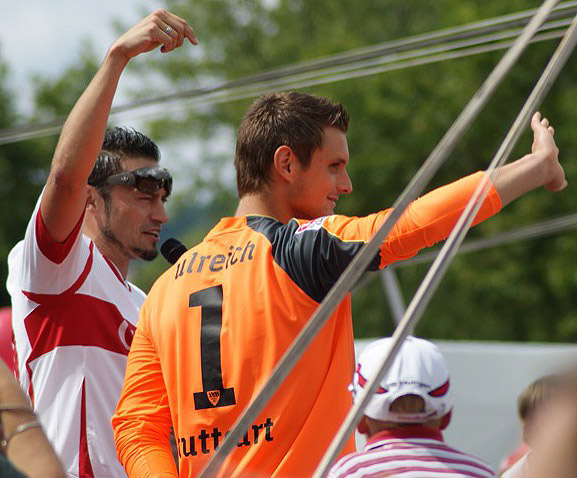
Ulreich with VfB Stuttgart in 2010

He was Stuttgart II's first-choice goalkeeper during their first four matches of the 2007–08 Regionalliga season, keeping two clean sheets in that period. He played 10 matches during the previous season, receiving two yellow cards.

In January 2008, he was promoted to the first team of VfB Stuttgart. But he also played again for the reserve team. He made his first team debut on 9 February 2008, in the 3–1 loss to Hertha BSC and earned his first victory as the starting goalkeeper on 16 February 2008, against MSV Duisburg.

On 6 April 2010, Ulreich extended his contract at VfB Stuttgart until the summer of 2013. On 20 January 2012 he extended his contract until June 2017.

For the 2015–16 season, Ulreich moved to Bayern Munich. He had been at Stuttgart since 1998.

=== Bayern Munich ===
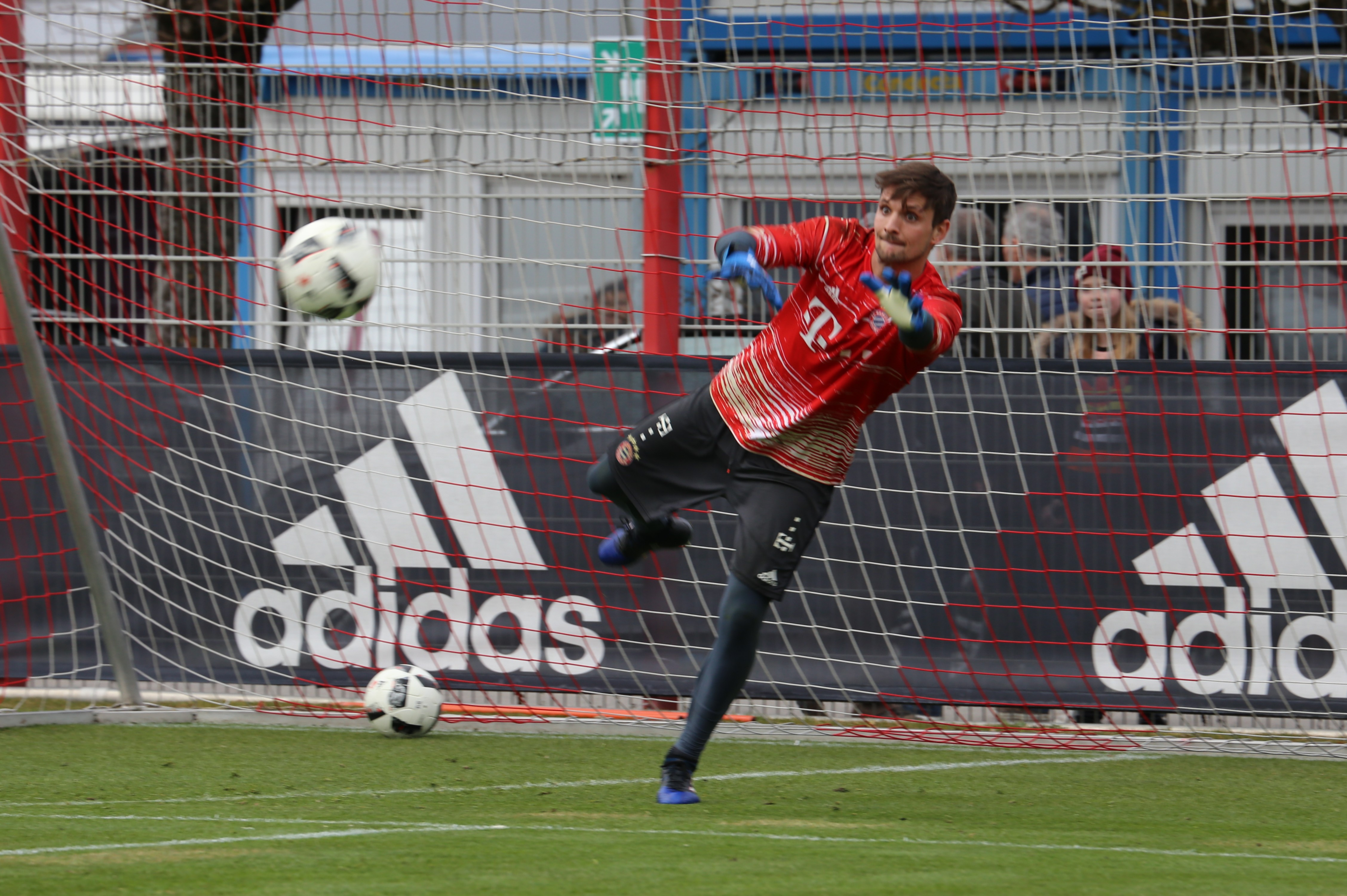
Ulreich training with Bayern Munich in 2017

Ulreich transferred to Bayern prior to the 2015–16 season and signed a contract until 2018. He was on the substitutes' bench for the 2015 DFL-Supercup. He finished the 2015–16 season with three appearances. He finished the 2016–17 season with seven appearances.

He was able to feature regularly for Bayern Munich during the 2017–18 season, due to a long-term injury to first-choice goalkeeper Manuel Neuer. Ulreich started the 2017–18 season by playing in the German Super Cup. Ulreich played a key role in guiding Bayern Munich to a record sixth successive German Bundesliga title, which was confirmed in a 1–4 win away at FC Augsburg on 7 April 2018. However, Bayern Munich were eliminated from 2017–18 Champions League partly due to a goalkeeping error by Ulreich against Real Madrid in semi-finals. Bayern lost 4–3 on aggregate. In total, he made 47 appearances in the 2017–18 season.

=== Hamburger SV ===
After Bayern had signed the goalkeeper Alexander Nübel in the summer of 2020 amidst much public interest, discussions arose as to who would be the backup behind Manuel Neuer in the future. Ulreich therefore moved to 2. Bundesliga club Hamburger SV in early October 2020 shortly before the end of the transfer window, signing a three-year contract. There, the 32-year-old immediately took over as the starter in place of Daniel Heuer Fernandes under new head coach Daniel Thioune.

On 4 June 2021, Ulreich's contract with HSV was terminated prematurely.

=== Return to Bayern Munich ===
On 27 June 2021, Ulreich returned to Bayern Munich. On 11 November 2022, he extended his contract with Bayern until 2024.

On 28 November 2023, Ulreich extended his contract with Bayern Munich until 30 June 2025. On 29 July 2025, he signed a one-year contract extension until 2026. On 14 March 2026, he made his first appearance for the club in 539 days during a 1–1 away draw against Bayer Leverkusen. Later that year, on 15 May, he renewed his contract with the club until 2027.

== International career ==
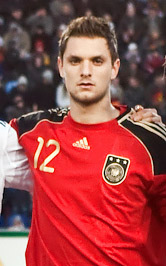
Ulreich with Germany U21 in 2010

Ulreich was a member of the Germany U16, Germany U19, Germany U21 teams, and received a single call-up for the senior team in 2019, though he did not feature in a match.

== Personal life ==
On 1 August 2025, Ulreich announced the June 2025 death of his six-year-old son Len following a “long and serious illness” on Instagram. Ulreich cited his son's illness as a reason for his absence from football during the preceding season. Together with his wife Lisa, he also has a daughter.

== Career statistics ==
As of match played 14 March 2026

Appearances and goals by club, season and competition
Club	Season	League			DFB-Pokal		Europe		Other		Total	
Club	Season	Division	Apps	Goals	Apps	Goals	Apps	Goals	Apps	Goals	Apps	Goals
VfB Stuttgart II	2006–07	Regionalliga Süd	10	0	—		—		—		10	0
VfB Stuttgart II	2007–08	Regionalliga Süd	19	0	—		—		—		19	0
VfB Stuttgart II	2008–09	3. Liga	36	0	—		—		—		36	0
VfB Stuttgart II	2009–10	3. Liga	8	0	—		—		—		8	0
VfB Stuttgart II	Total		73	0	—		—		—		73	0
VfB Stuttgart	2007–08	Bundesliga	11	0	1	0	0	0	—		12	0
VfB Stuttgart	2009–10	Bundesliga	4	0	1	0	0	0	—		5	0
VfB Stuttgart	2010–11	Bundesliga	34	0	3	0	11 (Note: Appearances in UEFA Europa League)	0	—		48	0
VfB Stuttgart	2011–12	Bundesliga	34	0	4	0	—		—		38	0
VfB Stuttgart	2012–13	Bundesliga	34	0	6	0	12	0	—		52	0
VfB Stuttgart	2013–14	Bundesliga	31	0	1	0	4	0	—		36	0
VfB Stuttgart	2014–15	Bundesliga	28	0	1	0	—		—		29	0
VfB Stuttgart	Total		176	0	17	0	27	0	—		220	0
Bayern Munich	2015–16	Bundesliga	1	0	1	0	1 (Note: Appearance(s) in UEFA Champions League)	0	0	0	3	0
Bayern Munich	2016–17	Bundesliga	5	0	1	0	1	0	0	0	7	0
Bayern Munich	2017–18	Bundesliga	29	0	6	0	11	0	1 (Note: Appearance in DFL-Supercup)	0	47	0
Bayern Munich	2018–19	Bundesliga	9	0	3	0	0	0	0	0	12	0
Bayern Munich	2019–20	Bundesliga	1	0	0	0	0	0	0	0	1	0
Bayern Munich	Total		45	0	11	0	13	0	1	0	70	0
Hamburger SV	2020–21	2. Bundesliga	32	0	0	0	—		—		32	0
Bayern Munich	2021–22	Bundesliga	6	0	1	0	1	0	0	0	8	0
Bayern Munich	2022–23	Bundesliga	3	0	2	0	3	0	0	0	8	0
Bayern Munich	2023–24	Bundesliga	11	0	0	0	3	0	1	0	15	0
Bayern Munich	2024–25	Bundesliga	1	0	0	0	1	0	0	0	2	0
Bayern Munich	2025–26	Bundesliga	1	0	0	0	0	0	0	0	1	0
Bayern Munich	2026–27	Bundesliga	0	0	0	0	0	0	0	0	0	0
Bayern Munich	Total		22	0	3	0	8	0	1	0	34	0
Career total			349	0	30	0	47	0	2	0	418	0

== Honours ==
Bayern Munich

- Bundesliga: 2015–16, 2016–17, 2017–18, 2018–19, 2019–20, 2021–22, 2022–23, 2024–25, 2025–26
- DFB-Pokal: 2015–16, 2018–19, 2019–20, 2025–26
- Franz Beckenbauer Supercup: 2016, 2017, 2018, 2021, 2022, 2025, 2026
- UEFA Champions League: 2019–20
- UEFA Super Cup: 2020

Individual

- Bayern Munich Player of the Season: 2017–18
