= Christian Früchtl =

German footballer

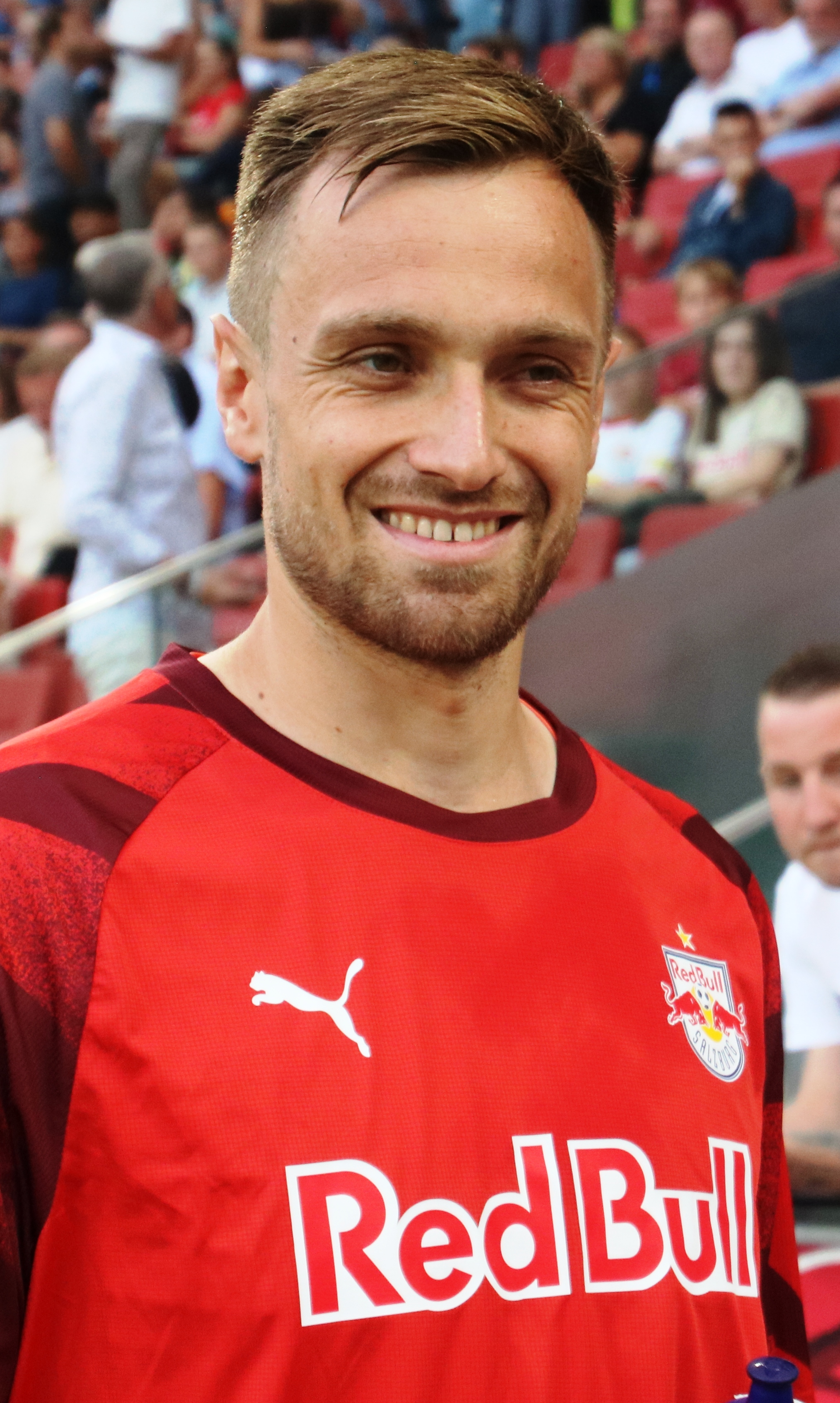
- Christian Früchtl 2026

Personal information
- Full name: Christian Martin Früchtl
- Date of birth: 28 January 2000 (age 26)
- Place of birth: Bischofsmais, Germany
- Height: 1.93 m (6 ft 4 in)
- Position: Goalkeeper

Team information
- Current team: Red Bull Salzburg
- Number: 1

Youth career
- SV Bischofsmais
- –2014: SpVgg Grün-Weiss Deggendorf
- 2014–2017: Bayern Munich

Senior career*
Years	Team	Apps	(Gls)
2017–2022	Bayern Munich II	70	(0)
2017–2022	Bayern Munich	1	(0)
2020–2021	→ 1. FC Nürnberg (loan)	0	(0)
2022–2024	Austria Wien	66	(0)
2024–2026	Lecce	0	(0)
2026–	Red Bull Salzburg	1	(0)

International career^{‡}
2015	Germany U15	1	(0)
2015–2016	Germany U16	5	(0)
2016–2017	Germany U17	6	(0)
2017–2018	Germany U18	2	(0)
2018–2019	Germany U19	2	(0)
2019	Germany U20	3	(0)
- * Club domestic league appearances and goals as of 10 October 2026 ‡ National team caps and goals as of 22:38, 5 July 2020 (UTC)

Christian Martin Früchtl (born 28 January 2000) is a German professional footballer who plays as a goalkeeper for Austrian Bundesliga club Red Bull Salzburg. He has represented Germany at various youth levels internationally.

== Club career ==
=== Youth career ===
Früchtl began his youth career at hometown club SV Bischofsmais, before moving to SpVgg Grün-Weiss Deggendorf. In 2014, he moved to the youth academy of Bayern Munich.

In 2017, Früchtl won the 2016–17 B-Junioren Bundesliga with Bayern's under-17 team, appearing 14 times during the season. Früchtl also appeared 7 times for Bayern's under-19 team during the 2016–17 season, finishing as runners-up in the A-Junioren Bundesliga.

=== Bayern Munich ===
Früchtl began his senior career for Bayern Munich II in the 2017–18 season, making his debut in the Regionalliga Bayern on 15 August 2017 in a 2–2 draw against VfR Garching. He made his professional debut for the reserve team in the 3. Liga on 20 July 2019, starting in the away match against Würzburger Kickers.

==== Loan to 1. FC Nürnberg ====
On 7 August 2020, Früchtl joined 2. Bundesliga side 1. FC Nürnberg on a season-long loan, however he did not feature in any game nor competitions.

=== Austria Wien ===
On 15 June 2022, following the end of the 2021–2022 season Früchtl would join Austrian Bundesliga club Austria Wien.

=== Lecce ===
On 25 June 2024, Früchtl moved to Italy and signed with Serie A club Lecce on a contract until 2027.

=== Red Bull Salzburg ===
On 5 August 2026, he returned to Austria and joined Red Bull Salzburg, on a permanent transfer.

== International career ==
Früchtl has progressed through some of the Germany national youth teams, including five caps for the under-17 team from 2016 to 2017.

== Career statistics ==
As of match played 28 October 2026

Appearances and goals by club, season and competition
Club	Season	League			National cup (Note: Includes Austrian Cup, Coppa Italia)		Continental		Other		Total	
Club	Season	Division	Apps	Goals	Apps	Goals	Apps	Goals	Apps	Goals	Apps	Goals
Bayern Munich II	2017–18	Regionalliga Bayern	20	0	—		—		—		20	0
Bayern Munich II	2018–19	Regionalliga Bayern	17	0	—		—		—		17	0
Bayern Munich II	2019–20	Regionalliga Bayern	27	0	—		—		—		27	0
Bayern Munich II	2021–22	Regionalliga Bayern	6	0	—		—		—		6	0
Bayern Munich II	Total		70	0	0	0	0	0	0	0	70	0
Bayern Munich	2017–18	Bundesliga	0	0	0	0	0	0	0	0	0	0
Bayern Munich	2018–19	Bundesliga	0	0	0	0	0	0	0	0	0	0
Bayern Munich	2019–20	Bundesliga	0	0	0	0	0	0	0	0	0	0
Bayern Munich	2021–22	Bundesliga	1	0	0	0	0	0	0	0	1	0
Bayern Munich	Total		1	0	0	0	0	0	0	0	1	0
1. FC Nürnberg (loan)	2020–21	2. Bundesliga	0	0	0	0	—		—		0	0
Austria Wien	2022–23	Austrian Bundesliga	34	0	3	0	7 (Note: Two appearances in UEFA Europa League, five appearances in UEFA Europa Conference League)	0	—		44	0
Austria Wien	2023–24	Austrian Bundesliga	32	0	0	0	4 (Note: Appearances in UEFA Europa Conference League)	0	—		36	0
Austria Wien	Total		66	0	3	0	11	0	0	0	80	0
Lecce	2024–25	Serie A	0	0	1	0	—		—		1	0
Lecce	2025–26	Serie A	0	0	1	0	—		—		1	0
Lecce	Total		0	0	2	0	0	0	0	0	2	0
Red Bull Salzburg	2026–27	Austrian Bundesliga	1	0	2	0	0	0	—		3	0
Career total			138	0	7	0	11	0	0	0	156	0

== Honours ==
Bayern Munich

- DFL-Supercup: 2017
- Bundesliga: 2017–18, 2018–19, 2019–20, 2021–22

Bayern Munich II

- Regionalliga Bayern: 2018–19
- 3. Liga: 2019–20
