= 2018–19 FC Bayern Munich season =

Bayern Munich
2018–19 season
- President: Uli Hoeneß
- CEO: Karl-Heinz Rummenigge
- Head coach: Niko Kovač
- Stadium: Allianz Arena
- Bundesliga: 1st
- DFB-Pokal: Winners
- DFL-Supercup: Winners
- UEFA Champions League: Round of 16
- Top goalscorer: League: Robert Lewandowski (22 goals); All: Robert Lewandowski (40 goals)
- Highest home attendance: 75,000
- Lowest home attendance: 70,000
- Average home league attendance: 75,000
- Biggest win: Bayern 6–0 Wolfsburg; Bayern 6–0 Mainz
- Biggest defeat: Bayern 0–3 Gladbach
Home colours	Away colours	Third colours

The 2018–19 FC Bayern Munich season was the 120th season in the football club's history and 54th consecutive and overall season in the top flight of German football, the Bundesliga, having been promoted from the Regionalliga in 1965. Bayern Munich also participated in this season's edition of the domestic cup, the DFB-Pokal, and the premier continental cup competition, the UEFA Champions League. Bayern were the reigning Bundesliga champions and therefore participated in the German super cup, the DFL-Supercup. This was the 14th season for Bayern in the Allianz Arena, located in Munich, Bavaria, Germany. The season covers a period from 1 July 2018 to 30 June 2019.

== Players ==
=== Squad information ===
Note: Flags indicate national team as defined under FIFA eligibility rules; some limited exceptions apply. Players may hold more than one non-FIFA nationality.

No.	Pos.	Nation	Player
1	GK	GER	Manuel Neuer (captain)
4	DF	GER	Niklas Süle
5	DF	GER	Mats Hummels
6	MF	ESP	Thiago
7	MF	FRA	Franck Ribéry
8	DF	ESP	Javi Martínez
9	FW	POL	Robert Lewandowski
10	MF	NED	Arjen Robben (3rd captain)
11	MF	COL	James Rodríguez (on loan from Real Madrid)
13	DF	BRA	Rafinha
17	DF	GER	Jérôme Boateng
18	MF	GER	Leon Goretzka

No.	Pos.	Nation	Player
19	MF	CAN	Alphonso Davies
20	FW	KOR	Jeong Woo-yeong
22	MF	GER	Serge Gnabry
24	MF	FRA	Corentin Tolisso
25	FW	GER	Thomas Müller (vice-captain)
26	GK	GER	Sven Ulreich
27	DF	AUT	David Alaba
29	MF	FRA	Kingsley Coman
32	DF	GER	Joshua Kimmich
35	MF	POR	Renato Sanches
36	GK	GER	Christian Früchtl
39	GK	GER	Ron-Thorben Hoffmann

== Transfers ==
=== Transfers in ===
Date from	Position	Player	From	Type	Fee	Ref.
30 June 2018	MF	(Brazil) Douglas Costa	(Italy) Juventus	Loan return	Free	
30 June 2018	MF	(Germany) Serge Gnabry	TSG Hoffenheim	Loan return	Free	
30 June 2018	MF	(Portugal) Renato Sanches	(Wales) Swansea City	Loan return	Free	
1 July 2018	MF	(Germany) Leon Goretzka	Schalke 04	End of contract	Free	
1 January 2019	MF	(Canada) Alphonso Davies	(Canada) Vancouver Whitecaps	Transfer	Undisclosed	

=== Transfers out ===
Date from	Position	Player	To	Type	Fee	Ref.
1 July 2018	MF	(Germany) Fabian Benko	(Austria) LASK	Released	Free	
1 July 2018	MF	(Germany) Niklas Dorsch	1. FC Heidenheim	Released	Free	
1 July 2018	MF	(Brazil) Douglas Costa	(Italy) Juventus	Transfer	€40M	
1 July 2018	DF	(Germany) Felix Götze	FC Augsburg	Transfer	Free	
1 July 2018	GK	(Germany) Tom Starke	Retired	Released	Free	
3 August 2018	MF	(Chile) Arturo Vidal	(Spain) Barcelona	Transfer	Undisclosed	
27 August 2018	MF	(Germany) Sebastian Rudy	Schalke 04	Transfer	Undisclosed	
31 August 2018	DF	(Spain) Juan Bernat	(France) Paris Saint-Germain	Transfer	€15M	
30 January 2019	FW	(Germany) Sandro Wagner	(China) Tianjin Teda	Transfer	Undisclosed	

== Friendly matches ==
Win Draw Loss

21 July 2018 ICC 1	Bayern Munich	3–1	Paris Saint-Germain	Klagenfurt, Austria
16:05 CEST (UTC+2)	Martínez 60'; Sanches 68'; Zirkzee 78'	Report	Weah 31'	Stadium: Wörthersee Stadion; Attendance: 22,300; Referee: Alexander Harkam (Austria)

25 July 2018 ICC 2	Juventus	2–0	Bayern Munich	Philadelphia, Pennsylvania, United States
19:05 EDT (UTC−4); 26 July 2018, 01:05 CEST (UTC+2)	Favilli 32', 40'	Report		Stadium: Lincoln Financial Field; Attendance: 32,105; Referee: Chris Penso (United States)

28 July 2018 ICC 3	Bayern Munich	2–3	Manchester City	Miami Gardens, Florida, United States
19:05 EDT (UTC−4); 29 July 2018, 01:05 CEST (UTC+2)	Shabani 15'; Robben 24'	Report	B. Silva 45+1', 70'; Nmecha 51'	Stadium: Hard Rock Stadium; Attendance: 29,195; Referee: Ted Unkel (United States)

5 August 2018 Telekom Sport Trophy	Bayern Munich	1–0	Manchester United	Munich, Germany
20:15 CEST (UTC+2)	Martínez 59'	Report		Stadium: Allianz Arena; Attendance: 75,000; Referee: Robert Hartmann

8 August 2018 Friendly	FC Rottach-Egern	2–20	Bayern Munich	Tegernsee, Germany
17:30 CEST (UTC+2)	Pfluger 26'; Schmidt 32'	Report	Coman 1', 13', 16'; Thiago 3'; Lewandowski 19', 33', 45'; Wagner 56', 63', 68'; Müller 58', 60'; Franzke 62', 74', 80'; Rudy 65'; Ribéry 70'; Rodríguez 76', 88'; Kimmich 79'	Stadium: Stadion am Birkenmoos; Attendance: 2,500; Referee: Wolfgang Haslberger

15 August 2018 Friendly	Hamburger SV	1–4	Bayern Munich	Hamburg, Germany
18:00 CEST (UTC+2)	Narey 25'	Report	Wagner 31' (pen.), 41'; Müller 73', 86'	Stadium: Volksparkstadion; Attendance: 27,638; Referee: Tobias Stieler

28 August 2018 Testimonial	Bayern Munich	4–0	Chicago Fire	Munich, Germany
20:30 CEST (UTC+2)	Gnabry 7'; Wagner 38'; Robben 63'; Schweinsteiger 83'	Report		Stadium: Allianz Arena; Attendance: 75,000; Referee: Daniel Schlager
Note: The match was a testimonial for Bastian Schweinsteiger, who played the first half for Chicago Fire and the second half for Bayern Munich.

13 January 2019 TC SF	Fortuna Düsseldorf	0–0 (7–8 p)	Bayern Munich	Düsseldorf, Germany
13:00 CET (UTC+1)		Report		Stadium: Merkur Spiel-Arena
	Penalties
	Ayhan (penalty scored); Gießelmann (penalty scored); Stöger (penalty missed); Lukebakio (penalty scored); Morales (penalty scored); Kamiński (penalty scored); Raman (penalty scored); Zimmermann (penalty scored); Usami (penalty missed)		(penalty missed) Alaba; (penalty scored) Müller; (penalty scored) Lewandowski; (penalty scored) Gnabry; (penalty scored) Goretzka; (penalty scored) Kimmich; (penalty scored) Coman; (penalty scored) Sanches; (penalty scored) Süle
Note: The match was only 1×45 minutes.

13 January 2019 TC Final	Bayern Munich	0–0 (4–2 p)	Borussia Mönchengladbach	Düsseldorf, Germany
16:30 CET (UTC+1)		Report		Stadium: Merkur Spiel-Arena
	Penalties
	Rodríguez (penalty scored); Wagner (penalty missed); Thiago (penalty scored); Goretzka (penalty scored); Hummels (penalty scored)		(penalty missed) Herrmann; (penalty scored) Drmić; (penalty scored) Strobl; (penalty missed) Zakaria
Note: The match was only 1×45 minutes.

27 May 2019 Friendly	Kaiserslautern	1–1	Bayern Munich	Kaiserslautern, Germany
18:30 CEST (UTC+2)	Zuck 8'	Report	Lewandowski 80'	Stadium: Fritz-Walter-Stadion; Attendance: 49,780; Referee: Nicolas Winter

29 May 2019 Friendly	SpVgg Lindau	2–4	Bayern Munich	Lindau, Germany
18:00 CEST (UTC+2)	Gaye 44'; Bolic 73'	Report	Türkkalesi 22'; Will 25'; Fritzler 82' (o.g.); Coman 89'	Stadium: Stadion an der Reutiner Straße; Attendance: 8,000; Referee: Stefan Fimpel

== Competitions ==
Win Draw Loss

=== Overview ===
Competition	First match	Last match	Starting round	Final position	Record							
Competition	First match	Last match	Starting round	Final position	Pld	W	D	L	GF	GA	GD	Win %
Bundesliga	24 August 2018	18 May 2019	Matchday 1	Winners	34	24	6	4	88	32	+56	70.59
DFB-Pokal	18 August 2018	25 May 2019	First round	Winners	6	6	0	0	17	9	+8	100.00
DFL-Supercup	12 August 2018		Final	Winners	1	1	0	0	5	0	+5	100.00
Champions League	19 September 2018	13 March 2019	Group stage	Round of 16	8	4	3	1	16	8	+8	50.00
Total					49	35	9	5	126	49	+77	71.43

Last updated: 25 May 2019
Source: Competitions

=== Bundesliga ===
==== League table ====
Pos	Team	Pld	W	D	L	GF	GA	GD	Pts	Qualification or relegation
1	Bayern Munich (C)	34	24	6	4	88	32	+56	78	Qualification for the Champions League group stage
2	Borussia Dortmund	34	23	7	4	81	44	+37	76	Qualification for the Champions League group stage
3	RB Leipzig	34	19	9	6	63	29	+34	66	Qualification for the Champions League group stage
4	Bayer Leverkusen	34	18	4	12	69	52	+17	58	Qualification for the Champions League group stage
5	Borussia Mönchengladbach	34	16	7	11	55	42	+13	55	Qualification for the Europa League group stage (Note: Since the winners of the 2018–19 DFB-Pokal, Bayern Munich, qualified for the Champions League based on league position, the Europa League group stage spot was passed to the sixth-placed team, and the Europa League second qualifying round spot was passed to the seventh-placed team.)

Source: DFB
Rules for classification: 1) Points; 2) Goal difference; 3) Goals scored; 4) Head-to-head results; 5) Head-to-head away goals scored; 6) Away goals scored; 7) Play-off
(C) Champions

==== Results summary ====
Overall								Home						Away					
Pld	W	D	L	GF	GA	GD	Pts	W	D	L	GF	GA	GD	W	D	L	GF	GA	GD
34	24	6	4	88	32	+56	78	13	3	1	49	14	+35	11	3	3	39	18	+21

Last updated: 25 May 2019.
Source: Bundesliga

==== Results by round ====
Round	1	2	3	4	5	6	7	8	9	10	11	12	13	14	15	16	17	18	19	20	21	22	23	24	25	26	27	28	29	30	31	32	33	34
Ground	H	A	H	A	H	A	H	A	A	H	A	H	A	H	A	H	A	A	H	A	H	A	H	A	H	H	A	H	A	H	A	H	A	H
Result	W	W	W	W	D	L	L	W	W	D	L	D	W	W	W	W	W	W	W	L	W	W	W	W	W	W	D	W	W	W	D	W	D	W
Position	2	1	1	1	1	2	6	4	2	3	5	5	4	3	3	3	2	2	2	3	2	2	2	2	1	1	2	1	1	1	1	1	1	1

Updated to match(es) played on 25 May 2019. Source: DFB
A = Away; H = Home; W = Win; D = Draw; L = Loss

==== Matches ====
24 August 2018 1	Bayern Munich	3–1	1899 Hoffenheim	Munich
20:30 CEST (UTC+2)	Müller 23'; Lewandowski 82' (pen.); Robben 90'	Report	Szalai 57'	Stadium: Allianz Arena; Attendance: 75,000; Referee: Bastian Dankert

1 September 2018 2	VfB Stuttgart	0–3	Bayern Munich	Stuttgart
18:30 CEST (UTC+2)		Report	Goretzka 37'; Lewandowski 62'; Müller 76'	Stadium: Mercedes-Benz Arena; Attendance: 58,680; Referee: Harm Osmers

15 September 2018 3	Bayern Munich	3–1	Bayer Leverkusen	Munich
15:30 CEST (UTC+2)	Tolisso 10'; Robben 19'; Rodríguez 89'	Report	Wendell 5' (pen.)	Stadium: Allianz Arena; Attendance: 75,000; Referee: Tobias Welz

22 September 2018 4	Schalke 04	0–2	Bayern Munich	Gelsenkirchen
18:30 CEST (UTC+2)		Report	Rodríguez 8'; Lewandowski 64' (pen.)	Stadium: Veltins-Arena; Attendance: 62,271; Referee: Daniel Siebert

25 September 2018 5	Bayern Munich	1–1	FC Augsburg	Munich
20:30 CEST (UTC+2)	Robben 48'	Report	Götze 86'	Stadium: Allianz Arena; Attendance: 75,000; Referee: Sören Storks

28 September 2018 6	Hertha BSC	2–0	Bayern Munich	Berlin
20:30 CEST (UTC+2)	Ibišević 23' (pen.); Duda 44'	Report		Stadium: Olympiastadion Berlin; Attendance: 74,669; Referee: Marco Fritz

6 October 2018 7	Bayern Munich	0–3	Borussia Mönchengladbach	Munich
18:30 CEST (UTC+2)		Report	Pléa 10'; Stindl 16'; Herrmann 88'	Stadium: Allianz Arena; Attendance: 75,000; Referee: Frank Willenborg

20 October 2018 8	VfL Wolfsburg	1–3	Bayern Munich	Wolfsburg
15:30 CEST (UTC+2)	Weghorst 63'	Report	Lewandowski 30', 48'; Rodríguez 72'	Stadium: Volkswagen Arena; Attendance: 30,000; Referee: Guido Winkmann

27 October 2018 9	Mainz 05	1–2	Bayern Munich	Mainz
15:30 CEST (UTC+2)	Boëtius 48'	Report	Goretzka 39'; Thiago 62'	Stadium: Opel Arena; Attendance: 33,305; Referee: Harm Osmers

3 November 2018 10	Bayern Munich	1–1	SC Freiburg	Munich
15:30 CET (UTC+1)	Gnabry 80'	Report	Höler 89'	Stadium: Allianz Arena; Attendance: 75,000; Referee: Felix Zwayer

10 November 2018 11	Borussia Dortmund	3–2	Bayern Munich	Dortmund
18:30 CET (UTC+1)	Reus 49' (pen.), 67'; Alcácer 73'	Report	Lewandowski 26', 52'	Stadium: Signal Iduna Park; Attendance: 81,365; Referee: Manuel Gräfe

24 November 2018 12	Bayern Munich	3–3	Fortuna Düsseldorf	Munich
15:30 CET (UTC+1)	Süle 17'; Müller 20', 58'	Report	Lukebakio 44', 77', 90+3'	Stadium: Allianz Arena; Attendance: 75,000; Referee: Sven Jablonski

1 December 2018 13	Werder Bremen	1–2	Bayern Munich	Bremen
15:30 CET (UTC+1)	Osako 33'	Report	Gnabry 20', 50'	Stadium: Weser-Stadion; Attendance: 42,100; Referee: Christian Dingert

8 December 2018 14	Bayern Munich	3–0	1. FC Nürnberg	Munich
15:30 CET (UTC+1)	Lewandowski 9', 27'; Ribéry 56'	Report		Stadium: Allianz Arena; Attendance: 75,000; Referee: Tobias Stieler

15 December 2018 15	Hannover 96	0–4	Bayern Munich	Hanover
15:30 CET (UTC+1)		Report	Kimmich 2'; Alaba 29'; Gnabry 53'; Lewandowski 62'	Stadium: HDI-Arena; Attendance: 49,000; Referee: Sören Storks

19 December 2018 16	Bayern Munich	1–0	RB Leipzig	Munich
20:30 CET (UTC+1)	Ribéry 83'	Report		Stadium: Allianz Arena; Attendance: 75,000; Referee: Marco Fritz

22 December 2018 17	Eintracht Frankfurt	0–3	Bayern Munich	Frankfurt
18:30 CET (UTC+1)		Report	Ribéry 35', 79'; Rafinha 89'	Stadium: Commerzbank-Arena; Attendance: 51,500; Referee: Manuel Gräfe

18 January 2019 18	1899 Hoffenheim	1–3	Bayern Munich	Sinsheim
20:30 CET (UTC+1)	Schulz 59'	Report	Goretzka 34', 45+1'; Lewandowski 87'	Stadium: PreZero Arena; Attendance: 30,150; Referee: Tobias Welz

27 January 2019 19	Bayern Munich	4–1	VfB Stuttgart	Munich
15:30 CET (UTC+1)	Thiago 5'; Gentner 55' (o.g.); Goretzka 71'; Lewandowski 84'	Report	Donis 26'	Stadium: Allianz Arena; Attendance: 75,000; Referee: Frank Willenborg

2 February 2019 20	Bayer Leverkusen	3–1	Bayern Munich	Leverkusen
15:30 CET (UTC+1)	Bailey 53'; Volland 63'; Alario 87'	Report	Goretzka 41'	Stadium: BayArena; Attendance: 30,210; Referee: Tobias Stieler

9 February 2019 21	Bayern Munich	3–1	Schalke 04	Munich
18:30 CET (UTC+1)	Bruma 11' (o.g.); Lewandowski 27'; Gnabry 57'	Report	Kutucu 25'	Stadium: Allianz Arena; Attendance: 75,000; Referee: Daniel Siebert

15 February 2019 22	FC Augsburg	2–3	Bayern Munich	Augsburg
20:30 CET (UTC+1)	Goretzka 1' (o.g.); Ji 23'	Report	Coman 17', 45+3'; Alaba 53'	Stadium: WWK Arena; Attendance: 30,660; Referee: Bibiana Steinhaus

23 February 2019 23	Bayern Munich	1–0	Hertha BSC	Munich
15:30 CET (UTC+1)	Martínez 62'	Report		Stadium: Allianz Arena; Attendance: 75,000; Referee: Harm Osmers

2 March 2019 24	Borussia Mönchengladbach	1–5	Bayern Munich	Mönchengladbach
18:30 CET (UTC+1)	Stindl 37'	Report	Martínez 2'; Müller 11'; Lewandowski 47', 90+1' (pen.); Gnabry 75'	Stadium: Borussia-Park; Attendance: 54,022; Referee: Felix Zwayer

9 March 2019 25	Bayern Munich	6–0	VfL Wolfsburg	Munich
15:30 CET (UTC+1)	Gnabry 34'; Lewandowski 37', 85'; Rodríguez 52'; Müller 76'; Kimmich 82'	Report		Stadium: Allianz Arena; Attendance: 75,000; Referee: Sascha Stegemann

17 March 2019 26	Bayern Munich	6–0	Mainz 05	Munich
18:00 CET (UTC+1)	Lewandowski 3'; Rodríguez 33', 51', 55'; Coman 39'; Davies 70'	Report		Stadium: Allianz Arena; Attendance: 75,000; Referee: Frank Willenborg

30 March 2019 27	SC Freiburg	1–1	Bayern Munich	Freiburg
15:30 CET (UTC+1)	Höler 3'	Report	Lewandowski 22'	Stadium: Schwarzwald-Stadion; Attendance: 24,000; Referee: Christian Dingert

6 April 2019 28	Bayern Munich	5–0	Borussia Dortmund	Munich
18:30 CEST (UTC+2)	Hummels 10'; Lewandowski 17', 89'; Martínez 41'; Gnabry 43'	Report		Stadium: Allianz Arena; Attendance: 75,000; Referee: Manuel Gräfe

14 April 2019 29	Fortuna Düsseldorf	1–4	Bayern Munich	Düsseldorf
15:30 CEST (UTC+2)	Lukebakio 89' (pen.)	Report	Coman 15', 41'; Gnabry 55'; Goretzka 90+2'	Stadium: Merkur Spiel-Arena; Attendance: 54,600; Referee: Felix Zwayer

20 April 2019 30	Bayern Munich	1–0	Werder Bremen	Munich
15:30 CEST (UTC+2)	Süle 75'	Report		Stadium: Allianz Arena; Attendance: 75,000; Referee: Tobias Welz

28 April 2019 31	1. FC Nürnberg	1–1	Bayern Munich	Nuremberg
18:00 CEST (UTC+2)	Pereira 48'	Report	Gnabry 75'	Stadium: Max-Morlock-Stadion; Attendance: 50,000; Referee: Tobias Stieler

4 May 2019 32	Bayern Munich	3–1	Hannover 96	Munich
15:30 CEST (UTC+2)	Lewandowski 27'; Goretzka 40'; Ribéry 83'	Report	Jonathas 51' (pen.)	Stadium: Allianz Arena; Attendance: 75,000; Referee: Christian Dingert

11 May 2019 33	RB Leipzig	0–0	Bayern Munich	Leipzig
15:30 CEST (UTC+2)		Report		Stadium: Red Bull Arena; Attendance: 41,939; Referee: Manuel Gräfe

18 May 2019 34	Bayern Munich	5–1	Eintracht Frankfurt	Munich
15:30 CEST (UTC+2)	Coman 4'; Alaba 53'; Sanches 58'; Ribéry 72'; Robben 78'	Report	Haller 50'	Stadium: Allianz Arena; Attendance: 75,000; Referee: Sascha Stegemann

=== DFB-Pokal ===
18 August 2018 First round	SV Drochtersen/Assel	0–1	Bayern Munich	Drochtersen
15:30 CEST (UTC+2)		Report	Lewandowski 82'	Stadium: Kehdinger Stadion; Attendance: 8,000; Referee: Thorben Siewer

30 October 2018 Second round	SV Rödinghausen	1–2	Bayern Munich	Osnabrück
20:45 CET (UTC+1)	Meyer 49'	Report	Wagner 8'; Müller 13' (pen.)	Stadium: Stadion an der Bremer Brücke; Attendance: 16,000; Referee: Timo Gerach

6 February 2019 Round of 16	Hertha BSC	2–3 (a.e.t.)	Bayern Munich	Berlin
20:45 CET (UTC+1)	Mittelstädt 3'; Selke 67'	Report	Gnabry 7', 49'; Coman 98'	Stadium: Olympiastadion Berlin; Attendance: 74,667; Referee: Markus Schmidt

3 April 2019 Quarter-finals	Bayern Munich	5–4	1. FC Heidenheim	Munich
18:30 CEST (UTC+2)	Goretzka 12'; Müller 53'; Lewandowski 55', 84' (pen.); Gnabry 65'	Report	Glatzel 26', 74', 77' (pen.); Schnatterer 39'	Stadium: Allianz Arena; Attendance: 75,000; Referee: Guido Winkmann

24 April 2019 Semi-finals	Werder Bremen	2–3	Bayern Munich	Bremen
20:45 CEST (UTC+2)	Osako 74'; Rashica 75'	Report	Lewandowski 36', 80' (pen.); Müller 63'	Stadium: Weser-Stadion; Attendance: 42,100; Referee: Daniel Siebert

25 May 2019 Final	RB Leipzig	0–3	Bayern Munich	Berlin
20:00 CEST (UTC+2)		Report	Lewandowski 29', 85'; Coman 78'	Stadium: Olympiastadion Berlin; Attendance: 74,322; Referee: Tobias Stieler

=== DFL-Supercup ===
12 August 2018 Final	Eintracht Frankfurt	0–5	Bayern Munich	Frankfurt
20:30 CEST (UTC+2)		Report	Lewandowski 21', 26', 54'; Coman 63'; Thiago 85'	Stadium: Commerzbank-Arena; Attendance: 51,500; Referee: Marco Fritz

=== UEFA Champions League ===
==== Group stage ====
Pos	Team	Pld	W	D	L	GF	GA	GD	Pts	Qualification
1	(Germany) Bayern Munich	6	4	2	0	15	5	+10	14	Advance to knockout phase
2	(Netherlands) Ajax	6	3	3	0	11	5	+6	12	Advance to knockout phase
3	(Portugal) Benfica	6	2	1	3	6	11	−5	7	Transfer to Europa League
4	(Greece) AEK Athens	6	0	0	6	2	13	−11	0	

Source: UEFA
Rules for classification: Group stage tiebreakers

19 September 2018 1	Benfica (Portugal)	0–2	(Germany) Bayern Munich	Lisbon, Portugal
20:00 WEST (UTC+1); 21:00 CEST (UTC+2)		Report	Lewandowski 10'; Sanches 54'	Stadium: Estádio da Luz; Attendance: 60,274; Referee: Antonio Mateu Lahoz (Spain)

2 October 2018 2	Bayern Munich (Germany)	1–1	(Netherlands) Ajax	Munich, Germany
21:00 CEST (UTC+2)	Hummels 4'	Report	Mazraoui 22'	Stadium: Allianz Arena; Attendance: 70,000; Referee: Pavel Královec (Czech Republic)

23 October 2018 3	AEK Athens (Greece)	0–2	(Germany) Bayern Munich	Athens, Greece
19:55 EEST (UTC+3); 18:55 CEST (UTC+2)		Report	Martínez 61'; Lewandowski 63'	Stadium: Olympic Stadium; Attendance: 61,221; Referee: Aleksei Kulbakov (Belarus)

7 November 2018 4	Bayern Munich (Germany)	2–0	(Greece) AEK Athens	Munich, Germany
21:00 CET (UTC+1)	Lewandowski 31' (pen.), 71'	Report		Stadium: Allianz Arena; Attendance: 70,000; Referee: Matej Jug (Slovenia)

27 November 2018 5	Bayern Munich (Germany)	5–1	(Portugal) Benfica	Munich, Germany
21:00 CET (UTC+1)	Robben 13', 30'; Lewandowski 36', 51'; Ribéry 76'	Report	Fernandes 46'	Stadium: Allianz Arena; Attendance: 70,000; Referee: Daniele Orsato (Italy)

12 December 2018 6	Ajax (Netherlands)	3–3	(Germany) Bayern Munich	Amsterdam, Netherlands
21:00 CET (UTC+1)	Tadić 61', 82' (pen.); Tagliafico 90+5'	Report	Lewandowski 13', 87' (pen.); Coman 90'	Stadium: Johan Cruyff Arena; Attendance: 52,244; Referee: Clément Turpin (France)

==== Knockout phase ====
===== Round of 16 =====
19 February 2019 First leg	Liverpool (England)	0–0	(Germany) Bayern Munich	Liverpool, England
20:00 GMT (UTC±0); 21:00 CET (UTC+1)		Report		Stadium: Anfield; Attendance: 52,250; Referee: Gianluca Rocchi (Italy)

13 March 2019 Second leg	Bayern Munich (Germany)	1–3 (1–3 agg.)	(England) Liverpool	Munich, Germany
21:00 CET (UTC+1)	Matip 39' (o.g.)	Report	Mané 26', 84'; Van Dijk 69'	Stadium: Allianz Arena; Attendance: 68,145; Referee: Daniele Orsato (Italy)

== Statistics ==
=== Appearances and goals ===
No.	Pos	Nat	Player	Total		Bundesliga		DFB-Pokal		DFL-Supercup		Champions League	
No.	Pos	Nat	Player	Apps	Goals	Apps	Goals	Apps	Goals	Apps	Goals	Apps	Goals
Goalkeepers
1	GK	(Germany) GER	Manuel Neuer	38	0	26	0	3	0	1	0	8	0
26	GK	(Germany) GER	Sven Ulreich	12	0	8+1	0	3	0	0	0	0	0
36	GK	(Germany) GER	Christian Früchtl	0	0	0	0	0	0	0	0	0	0
39	GK	(Germany) GER	Ron-Thorben Hoffmann	0	0	0	0	0	0	0	0	0	0
Defenders
4	DF	(Germany) GER	Niklas Süle	42	2	29+2	2	4	0	1	0	5+1	0
5	DF	(Germany) GER	Mats Hummels	33	2	20+1	1	5	0	1	0	6	1
8	DF	(Spain) ESP	Javi Martínez	33	4	16+5	3	4+1	0	1	0	6	1
13	DF	(Brazil) BRA	Rafinha	26	1	9+7	1	3+1	0	0	0	4+2	0
17	DF	(Germany) GER	Jérôme Boateng	28	0	19+1	0	2+1	0	0	0	5	0
27	DF	(Austria) AUT	David Alaba	43	3	29+2	3	4	0	1	0	7	0
32	DF	(Germany) GER	Joshua Kimmich	48	2	34	2	5+1	0	1	0	7	0
Midfielders
6	MF	(Spain) ESP	Thiago	42	3	26+4	2	6	0	1	1	4+1	0
7	MF	(France) FRA	Franck Ribéry	38	7	10+15	6	3+2	0	1	0	6+1	1
10	MF	(Netherlands) NED	Arjen Robben	19	6	7+5	4	1+1	0	1	0	4	2
11	MF	(Colombia) COL	James Rodríguez	28	7	13+7	7	2+1	0	0	0	4+1	0
18	MF	(Germany) GER	Leon Goretzka	42	9	23+7	8	3+2	1	0+1	0	3+3	0
19	MF	(Canada) CAN	Alphonso Davies	6	1	0+6	1	0	0	0	0	0	0
22	MF	(Germany) GER	Serge Gnabry	42	13	21+9	10	4+1	3	0	0	5+2	0
24	MF	(France) FRA	Corentin Tolisso	4	1	1+1	1	0+2	0	0	0	0	0
29	MF	(France) FRA	Kingsley Coman	30	10	17+4	6	3+2	2	0+1	1	1+2	1
35	MF	(Portugal) POR	Renato Sanches	24	2	4+13	1	1	0	0	0	1+5	1
37	MF	(Germany) GER	Meritan Shabani	2	0	0+1	0	0+1	0	0	0	0	0
Forwards
9	FW	(Poland) POL	Robert Lewandowski	47	40	33	22	4+1	7	1	3	8	8
20	FW	(South Korea) KOR	Jeong Woo-yeong	2	0	0+1	0	0	0	0	0	0+1	0
25	FW	(Germany) GER	Thomas Müller	45	9	28+4	6	5+1	3	1	0	4+2	0
Players transferred out during the season
2	FW	(Germany) GER	Sandro Wagner	12	1	1+6	0	1	1	0+1	0	0+3	0

Last updated: 25 May 2019
Source: Competitions

=== Goalscorers ===
As of 25 May 2019

Rank	Position	Name	Bundesliga	DFB-Pokal	DFL-Supercup	Champions League	Total
1	FW	(Poland) Robert Lewandowski	22	7	3	8	40
2	FW	(Germany) Serge Gnabry	10	3	0	0	13
3	MF	(France) Kingsley Coman	6	2	1	1	10
4	MF	(Germany) Leon Goretzka	8	1	0	0	9
4	FW	(Germany) Thomas Müller	6	3	0	0	9
6	MF	(France) Franck Ribéry	6	0	0	1	7
6	MF	(Colombia) James Rodríguez	7	0	0	0	7
8	MF	(Netherlands) Arjen Robben	4	0	0	2	6
9	DF	(Spain) Javi Martínez	3	0	0	1	4
10	DF	(Austria) David Alaba	3	0	0	0	3
10	MF	(Spain) Thiago	2	0	1	0	3
12	DF	(Germany) Mats Hummels	1	0	0	1	2
12	DF	(Germany) Joshua Kimmich	2	0	0	0	2
12	MF	(Portugal) Renato Sanches	1	0	0	1	2
12	DF	(Germany) Niklas Süle	2	0	0	0	2
16	MF	(Canada) Alphonso Davies	1	0	0	0	1
16	DF	(Brazil) Rafinha	1	0	0	0	1
16	MF	(France) Corentin Tolisso	1	0	0	0	1
16	FW	(Germany) Sandro Wagner	0	1	0	0	1
Own goal			2	0	0	1	3
Total			88	17	5	16	126

=== Clean sheets ===
As of 22 December 2018

Rank	Name	Bundesliga	DFB-Pokal	DFL-Supercup	Champions League	Total
1	(Germany) Manuel Neuer	6	1	1	3	11
Total		6	1	1	3	11

=== Disciplinary record ===
As of 10 March 2019

Rank	Position	Name	Bundesliga			DFB-Pokal			DFL-Supercup			Champions League			Total		
Rank	Position	Name	Yellow card	(yellow card) (yellow-red card)	Red card	Yellow card	(yellow card) (yellow-red card)	Red card	Yellow card	(yellow card) (yellow-red card)	Red card	Yellow card	(yellow card) (yellow-red card)	Red card	Yellow card	(yellow card) (yellow-red card)	Red card
1	FW	(Germany) Thomas Müller	1	0	0	0	0	0	0	0	0	0	0	1	1	0	1
1	DF	(Germany) Niklas Süle	1	0	0	0	0	1	0	0	0	0	0	0	1	0	1
2	MF	(Netherlands) Arjen Robben	0	1	0	1	0	0	0	0	0	1	0	0	2	1	0
2	MF	(Portugal) Renato Sanches	1	1	0	1	0	0	0	0	0	0	0	0	2	1	0
3	DF	(Germany) Joshua Kimmich	4	0	0	0	0	0	0	0	0	3	0	0	7	0	0
4	DF	(Austria) David Alaba	4	0	0	0	0	0	0	0	0	0	0	0	4	0	0
4	DF	(Spain) Javi Martínez	3	0	0	0	0	0	0	0	0	1	0	0	4	0	0
4	MF	(Spain) Thiago	4	0	0	0	0	0	0	0	0	0	0	0	4	0	0
5	MF	(Germany) Leon Goretzka	2	0	0	1	0	0	0	0	0	0	0	0	3	0	0
5	MF	(France) Franck Ribéry	2	0	0	0	0	0	0	0	0	1	0	0	3	0	0
5	MF	(Colombia) James Rodríguez	2	0	0	0	0	0	0	0	0	1	0	0	3	0	0
6	DF	(Germany) Mats Hummels	0	0	0	0	0	0	1	0	0	1	0	0	2	0	0
6	FW	(Poland) Robert Lewandowski	1	0	0	1	0	0	0	0	0	0	0	0	2	0	0
6	DF	(Brazil) Rafinha	1	0	0	0	0	0	0	0	0	1	0	0	2	0	0
6	FW	(Germany) Sandro Wagner	2	0	0	0	0	0	0	0	0	0	0	0	2	0	0
7	DF	(Germany) Jérôme Boateng	1	0	0	0	0	0	0	0	0	0	0	0	1	0	0
7	FW	(France) Kingsley Coman	1	0	0	0	0	0	0	0	0	0	0	0	1	0	0
7	MF	(Germany) Serge Gnabry	0	0	0	0	0	0	0	0	0	1	0	0	1	0	0
7	GK	(Germany) Manuel Neuer	1	0	0	0	0	0	0	0	0	0	0	0	1	0	0
Total			31	2	0	4	0	1	1	0	0	10	0	1	46	2	2
