= 2017–18 FC Bayern Munich season =

119th season in existence of Bayern Munich

Bayern Munich
2017–18 season
- President: Uli Hoeneß
- CEO: Karl-Heinz Rummenigge
- Head coach: Carlo Ancelotti (until 28 September); Willy Sagnol (interim, 28 September – 8 October); Jupp Heynckes (from 9 October)
- Stadium: Allianz Arena
- Bundesliga: 1st
- DFB-Pokal: Runners-up
- DFL-Supercup: Winners
- UEFA Champions League: Semi-finals
- Top goalscorer: League: Robert Lewandowski (29 goals); All: Robert Lewandowski (41 goals)
- Highest home attendance: 75,000
- Lowest home attendance: 70,000
- Average home league attendance: 75,000
- Biggest win: Paderborn 0–6 Bayern; Bayern 6–0 Hamburg; Bayern 6–0 Dortmund
- Biggest defeat: PSG 3–0 Bayern; Bayern 1–4 Stuttgart
Home colours	Away colours	Third colours

The 2017–18 season was the 119th season in the history of FC Bayern Munich, a German football club, and their 53rd consecutive season in the top flight of German football, the Bundesliga, since it was established in 1965. Bayern Munich also participated in the DFB-Pokal and the UEFA Champions League. Bayern were the reigning Bundesliga champions, and therefore also participated in the DFL-Supercup. This is the 13th season for Bayern in the Allianz Arena, located in Munich, Bavaria, Germany.

The season was the first since 2004–05 without former captain Philipp Lahm, who retired after the 2016–17 season.

== Season overview ==
=== Background ===
In the previous season, Bayern won a record-setting fifth consecutive and 26th overall Bundesliga title, and 27th German title. They also won the DFL-Supercup, beating Borussia Dortmund. Bayern Munich were knocked out of the DFB-Pokal in the semi-finals by Borussia Dortmund, and were knocked out of the UEFA Champions League in the quarter-finals by Real Madrid.

On 15 January 2017, Bayern announced the signing of Niklas Süle and Sebastian Rudy, both from 1899 Hoffenheim. Süle was signed for an undisclosed fee, with a five-year contract lasting until 2022. Rudy joined on a free transfer, signing a three-year contract until 2020. On 7 February, Bayern captain Philipp Lahm confirmed his retirement at the end of the 2016–17 season. On 9 March, Xabi Alonso announced his retirement at the end of the 2016–17 campaign. On 14 March, Bayern announced that youth player Marco Friedl signed his first professional contract, lasting four years until 2021. On 27 April, Bayern announced the permanent signing of Kingsley Coman in the summer for €21 million, previously on loan from Juventus, with a contract running for three years until 2020. On 12 May, Bayern announced that Holger Badstuber, on loan to Schalke 04, would be released on a free transfer in the summer following the end of his contract on 30 June. Also on 12 May, Bayern announced that Juventus permanently signed Medhi Benatia for €17 million, on loan from Bayern since the start of the 2016–17 season. On 17 May, it was announced that youth goalkeeper Christian Früchtl would be the third-string goalkeeper for the 2017–18 season. On 19 May, it was announced that goalkeeper Tom Starke would retire at the end of the 2016–17 season. On 24 May, Bayern youth defender Felix Götze signed a professional contract with the club, with a two-year contract lasting until 2019. On 11 June, Bayern signed German forward Serge Gnabry from Werder Bremen for an undisclosed fee, with a three-year contract lasting until 2020. On 14 June, Bayern announced the signing of midfielder Corentin Tolisso from Lyon for €41.5 million plus possible add-ons up to an additional €6 million, with a five-year contract lasting until 2022. On 30 June, it was announced that Gianluca Gaudino, who was returning to Bayern following his loan spell at FC St. Gallen, would move to Chievo.

On 29 April, after winning the Bundesliga, Bayern confirmed a spot in the 2017 DFL-Supercup, taking place on 5 August, and will play away to the winners of the 2016–17 DFB-Pokal, Borussia Dortmund.

On 14 March, it was announced that Bayern would take part in the 2017 International Champions Cup in July as part of the 2017 Audi Summer Tour. The first two matches will take place in China as part of the 2017 Audi Football Summit. The first match is against Arsenal on 19 July in Shanghai, and the second against Milan on 22 July in Shenzhen. The final two matches will take place in Singapore, with Bayern playing Chelsea on 25 July and Internazionale on 27 July. On 21 April, it was announced that Bayern would take part in the summer 2017 edition of the Telekom Cup, taking place at the BORUSSIA-PARK in Mönchengladbach on 15 July. On 12 May, Bayern announced they would host the 2017 Audi Cup, the fifth edition of the pre-season tournament, at the Allianz Arena. Bayern will face Liverpool in the first round, with Atlético Madrid and Napoli contesting the other semi-final.

On 9 June, Bayern announced the appointment of former player Willy Sagnol as assistant manager, joining head coach Carlo Ancelotti and assistant coach Davide Ancelotti from 1 July 2017.

On 11 June, Bayern were drawn against Chemnitzer FC in the first round of the DFB-Pokal.

On 29 June, the Bundesliga schedule for the 2017–18 season was released, with Bayern playing Bayer Leverkusen in the opening fixture.

=== July ===
Training for the new season began on 1 July. Players that returned for training included Juan Bernat, Kingsley Coman, Marco Friedl, Christian Früchtl, Mats Hummels, Javi Martínez, Thomas Müller, and Franck Ribéry. Tom Starke, who retired at the end of the previous season, returned as standby professional to help during pre-season training while Bayern's other goalkeepers were still recovering from injury. Manuel Neuer and Jérôme Boateng continued their rehabilitation program in the performance center. The rest of the first-team squad were scheduled to return to training on 10 July.

On 6 July, Bayern faced BCF Wolfratshausen in the first friendly match of the season, which was only 60 minutes long. Bayern won the match 4–1, with a goal from Manuel Wintzheimer and Thomas Müller, and a brace from Franck Evina.

On 7 July, Bayern announced the squad for the 2017 Audi Summer Tour to China and Singapore. Manuel Neuer and Sven Ulreich will not join the squad, still recovering from injury. Serge Gnabry, Joshua Kimmich, Sebastian Rudy, Niklas Süle, and Arturo Vidal were also not included in the squad, given an extended summer break after international tournaments.

On 9 July, Bayern faced FSV Erlangen-Bruck in a charity match. Bayern won the match 9–1, with goals from Marco Friedl, Michael Strein, and Raphael Obermair, and braces from Franck Evina, Kingsley Coman, and Marco Hingerl. On 10 July, additional players returned from summer holiday, including David Alaba, Robert Lewandowski, Rafinha, Arjen Robben, Thiago, and Corentin Tolisso.

On 11 July, Bayern announced the signing of Colombian midfielder James Rodríguez from Real Madrid on a two-year loan spell, lasting until 2019, with an option to make the move permanent. He will also join the squad for the Audi Summer Tour in Asia.

== Players ==
=== Squad information ===
As of 28 April 2018

Note: Flags indicate national team as defined under FIFA eligibility rules; some limited exceptions apply. Players may hold more than one non-FIFA nationality.

No.	Pos.	Nation	Player
1	GK	GER	Manuel Neuer (captain)
2	FW	GER	Sandro Wagner
4	DF	GER	Niklas Süle
5	DF	GER	Mats Hummels
6	MF	ESP	Thiago
7	MF	FRA	Franck Ribéry
8	DF	ESP	Javi Martínez
9	FW	POL	Robert Lewandowski
10	MF	NED	Arjen Robben (3rd captain)
11	MF	COL	James Rodríguez (on loan from Real Madrid)
13	DF	BRA	Rafinha
14	DF	ESP	Juan Bernat
15	DF	GER	Lukas Mai
16	MF	GER	Meritan Shabani
17	DF	GER	Jérôme Boateng

No.	Pos.	Nation	Player
18	FW	GER	Franck Evina
19	MF	GER	Sebastian Rudy
20	DF	GER	Felix Götze
22	GK	GER	Tom Starke
23	MF	CHI	Arturo Vidal
24	MF	FRA	Corentin Tolisso
25	FW	GER	Thomas Müller (vice-captain)
26	GK	GER	Sven Ulreich
27	DF	AUT	David Alaba
29	MF	FRA	Kingsley Coman
30	MF	GER	Niklas Dorsch
32	DF	GER	Joshua Kimmich
36	GK	GER	Christian Früchtl
40	MF	GER	Fabian Benko

=== Transfers ===
==== In ====
No.	Pos	Player	From	Type	Window	Ends	Fee	Source
2	FW	(Germany) Sandro Wagner	1899 Hoffenheim	Transfer	Winter	2020	Undisclosed	
4	DF	(Germany) Niklas Süle	1899 Hoffenheim	Transfer	Summer	2022	Undisclosed	
5	DF	(Morocco) Medhi Benatia	(Italy) Juventus	Loan return	Summer	2019	Free	
11	MF	(Colombia) James Rodríguez	(Spain) Real Madrid	Loan	Summer	2019	Undisclosed	
16	DF	(Germany) Gianluca Gaudino	(Switzerland) FC St. Gallen	Loan return	Summer	2018	Free	
19	MF	(Germany) Sebastian Rudy	1899 Hoffenheim	Transfer	Summer	2020	Free	
20	DF	(Germany) Felix Götze	Bayern Munich U19	Promoted to first team	Summer	2019	Free	
22	GK	(Germany) Tom Starke	Free agent	Free transfer	—	2018	Free	
24	MF	(France) Corentin Tolisso	(France) Lyon	Transfer	Summer	2022	€41,500,000	
28	DF	(Germany) Holger Badstuber	Schalke 04	Loan return	Summer	2017	Free	
29	MF	(France) Kingsley Coman	(Italy) Juventus	Transfer	Summer	2020	€21,000,000	
34	DF	(Austria) Marco Friedl	Bayern Munich U19	Promoted to first team	Summer	2021	Free	
36	GK	(Germany) Christian Früchtl	Bayern Munich U19	Promoted to first team	Summer	2021	Free	
—	MF	(Germany) Serge Gnabry	Werder Bremen	Transfer	Summer	2020	Undisclosed	

==== Out ====
No.	Pos	Player	To	Type	Window	Fee	Source
5	DF	(Morocco) Medhi Benatia	(Italy) Juventus	Transfer	Summer	€17,000,000	
11	MF	(Brazil) Douglas Costa	(Italy) Juventus	Loan	Summer	Undisclosed	
14	MF	(Spain) Xabi Alonso	Retired	Released	Summer	Free	
16	DF	(Germany) Gianluca Gaudino	(Italy) Chievo	Transfer	Summer	Undisclosed	
21	DF	(Germany) Philipp Lahm	Retired	Released	Summer	Free	
22	GK	(Germany) Tom Starke	Retired	Released	Summer	Free	
28	DF	(Germany) Holger Badstuber	Free agent	Released	Summer	Free	
29	MF	(France) Kingsley Coman	(Italy) Juventus	Loan return	Summer	Free	
34	DF	(Austria) Marco Friedl	Werder Bremen	Loan	Winter	Undisclosed	
35	MF	(Portugal) Renato Sanches	(Wales) Swansea City	Loan	Summer	Undisclosed	
—	MF	(Germany) Serge Gnabry	1899 Hoffenheim	Loan	Summer	Undisclosed	

== Friendly matches ==
Win Draw Loss

6 July 2017 Friendly	BCF Wolfratshausen	1–4	Bayern Munich	Wolfratshausen, Germany
18:30 CEST (UTC+2)	Potenza 60+1'	Report	Wintzheimer 4'; Müller 30'; Evina 32', 59'	Stadium: Isar-Loisach-Stadion; Attendance: 4,000
Note: The match was only 2×30 minutes.

9 July 2017 Charity match	FSV Erlangen-Bruck	1–9	Bayern Munich	Erlangen, Germany
17:00 CEST (UTC+2)	Foth 86'	Report	Evina 16', 28'; Friedl 19'; Coman 30', 41'; Strein 53'; Hingerl 78', 89'; Obermair 83'	Stadium: Adi Dassler Sportpark; Attendance: 4,000

15 July 2017 TC SF	Bayern Munich	1–0	1899 Hoffenheim	Mönchengladbach, Germany
15:15 CEST (UTC+2)	Lewandowski 7'	Report		Stadium: Borussia-Park; Attendance: 45,000; Referee: Sascha Stegemann
Note: The match was only 1×45 minutes.

15 July 2017 TC Final	Werder Bremen	0–2	Bayern Munich	Mönchengladbach, Germany
17:45 CEST (UTC+2)		Report	Müller 13'; Bernat 34'	Stadium: Borussia-Park; Attendance: 42,000; Referee: Sascha Stegemann
Note: The match was only 1×45 minutes.

19 July 2017 ICC China 1	Bayern Munich	1–1 (2–3 p)	Arsenal	Shanghai, China
19:20 CST (UTC+8); 13:20 CEST (UTC+2)	Lewandowski 9' (pen.)	Report	Iwobi 90+4'	Stadium: Shanghai Stadium; Attendance: 39,208; Referee: Guan Xing (China)
	Penalties
	Alaba (penalty missed); Hummels (penalty scored); Coman (penalty scored); Sanches (penalty missed); Bernat (penalty missed)		(penalty scored) Ramsey; (penalty missed) Elneny; (penalty scored) Monreal; (penalty scored) Iwobi
Note: The match was part of the 2017 Audi Football Summit and the 2017 Audi Summer Tour.

22 July 2017 ICC China 2	Bayern Munich	0–4	Milan	Shenzhen, China
17:35 CST (UTC+8); 11:35 CEST (UTC+2)		Report	Kessié 14'; Cutrone 25', 43'; Çalhanoğlu 85'	Stadium: Longgang Stadium; Attendance: 39,998; Referee: Ai Kun (China)
Note: The match was part of the 2017 Audi Football Summit and the 2017 Audi Summer Tour.

25 July 2017 ICC Singapore 1	Chelsea	2–3	Bayern Munich	Kallang, Singapore
19:35 SGT (UTC+8); 13:35 CEST (UTC+2)	Alonso 45+3'; Batshuayi 85'	Report	Rafinha 6'; Müller 12', 27'	Stadium: National Stadium; Attendance: 48,522; Referee: Muhammad Taqi Aljaafari Bin Jahari (Singapore)
Note: The match was part of the 2017 Audi Summer Tour.

27 July 2017 ICC Singapore 2	Bayern Munich	0–2	Internazionale	Kallang, Singapore
19:35 SGT (UTC+8); 13:35 CEST (UTC+2)		Report	Éder 8', 30'	Stadium: National Stadium; Attendance: 23,388; Referee: Jansen Foo (Singapore)
Note: The match was part of the 2017 Audi Summer Tour.

1 August 2017 AC SF	Bayern Munich	0–3	Liverpool	Munich, Germany
20:30 CEST (UTC+2)		Report	Mané 7'; Salah 34'; Sturridge 83'	Stadium: Allianz Arena; Attendance: 57,500; Referee: Robert Hartmann

2 August 2017 AC TP	Bayern Munich	0–2	Napoli	Munich, Germany
17:45 CEST (UTC+2)		Report	Koulibaly 14'; Giaccherini 55'	Stadium: Allianz Arena; Attendance: 66,000; Referee: Benjamin Cortus

20 August 2017 Dream Game	Red Residenz Coburg 01	1–8	Bayern Munich	Coburg, Germany
17:00 CEST (UTC+2)	Knoch 86'	Report	Benko 5', 41'; Sanches 26', 62'; Rudy 55'; Tillman 77'; Vidal 83'; Wriedt 87'	Stadium: Red Residenz Arena; Attendance: 10,500

30 August 2017 Charity match	Kickers Offenbach	1–4	Bayern Munich	Offenbach, Germany
18:00 CEST (UTC+2)	Göcer 62'	Report	Wriedt 12', 59'; Kirchhoff 18' (o.g.); Ribéry 90'	Stadium: Sparda-Bank-Hessen-Stadion; Attendance: 20,500; Referee: Tobias Stieler

6 January 2018 Friendly	Al Ahli	0–6	Bayern Munich	Doha, Qatar
17:30 AST (UTC+3); 15:30 CET (UTC+1)		Report	Wagner 38'; Tolisso 52'; Robben 58'; Coman 69'; Dorsch 74'; Süle 88'	Stadium: Aspire Zone Pitch 5 Attendance: 1,000; Referee: Saoud Al Athbah (Qatar)

9 January 2018 Friendly	Bayern Munich	5–3	Sonnenhof Großaspach	Munich, Germany
17:00 CET (UTC+1)	Coman 33'; Müller 50'; Ribéry 59', 63', 70'	Report	Sané 41' (pen.); Sohm 56'; Rodríguez 61'	Stadium: Allianz Arena; Attendance: 7,000; Referee: Michael Bacher

== Competitions ==
Win Draw Loss

=== Overview ===
Competition	First match	Last match	Starting round	Final position	Record							
Competition	First match	Last match	Starting round	Final position	Pld	W	D	L	GF	GA	GD	Win %
Bundesliga	18 August 2017	12 May 2018	Matchday 1	Winners	34	27	3	4	92	28	+64	79.41
DFB-Pokal	12 August 2017	19 May 2018	First round	Runners-up	6	4	1	1	21	7	+14	66.67
DFL-Supercup	5 August 2017		Final	Winners	1	0	1	0	2	2	+0	0.00
UEFA Champions League	12 September 2017	1 May 2018	Group stage	Semi-finals	12	8	2	2	26	12	+14	66.67
Total					53	39	7	7	141	49	+92	73.58

Last updated: 21 May 2018
Source: Competitions

=== Bundesliga ===
==== League table ====
Pos	Team	Pld	W	D	L	GF	GA	GD	Pts	Qualification or relegation
1	Bayern Munich (C)	34	27	3	4	92	28	+64	84	Qualification for the Champions League group stage
2	Schalke 04	34	18	9	7	53	37	+16	63	Qualification for the Champions League group stage
3	1899 Hoffenheim	34	15	10	9	66	48	+18	55	Qualification for the Champions League group stage
4	Borussia Dortmund	34	15	10	9	64	47	+17	55	Qualification for the Champions League group stage
5	Bayer Leverkusen	34	15	10	9	58	44	+14	55	Qualification for the Europa League group stage

Source: DFB
Rules for classification: 1) Points; 2) Goal difference; 3) Goals scored; 4) Head-to-head results; 5) Head-to-head away goals scored; 6) Away goals scored; 7) Play-off.
(C) Champions

==== Results summary ====
Overall								Home						Away					
Pld	W	D	L	GF	GA	GD	Pts	W	D	L	GF	GA	GD	W	D	L	GF	GA	GD
34	27	3	4	92	28	+64	84	14	2	1	56	15	+41	13	1	3	36	13	+23

Last updated: 21 May 2018.
Source: Bundesliga

==== Results by round ====
Round	1	2	3	4	5	6	7	8	9	10	11	12	13	14	15	16	17	18	19	20	21	22	23	24	25	26	27	28	29	30	31	32	33	34
Ground	H	A	A	H	A	H	A	H	A	H	A	H	A	H	A	H	A	A	H	H	A	H	A	H	A	H	A	H	A	H	A	H	A	H
Result	W	W	L	W	W	D	D	W	W	W	W	W	L	W	W	W	W	W	W	W	W	W	W	D	W	W	L	W	W	W	W	W	W	L
Position	2	2	6	3	2	3	2	2	2	1	1	1	1	1	1	1	1	1	1	1	1	1	1	1	1	1	1	1	1	1	1	1	1	1

Updated to match(es) played on 21 May 2018. Source: Bundesliga
A = Away; H = Home; W = Win; D = Draw; L = Loss

==== Matches ====
18 August 2017 1	Bayern Munich	3–1	Bayer Leverkusen	Munich
20:30 CEST (UTC+2)	Süle 9'; Tolisso 18'; Lewandowski 53' (pen.)	Report	Mehmedi 65'	Stadium: Allianz Arena; Attendance: 75,000; Referee: Tobias Stieler

26 August 2017 2	Werder Bremen	0–2	Bayern Munich	Bremen
15:30 CEST (UTC+2)		Report	Lewandowski 72', 75'	Stadium: Weser-Stadion; Attendance: 42,100; Referee: Bastian Dankert

9 September 2017 3	1899 Hoffenheim	2–0	Bayern Munich	Sinsheim
18:30 CEST (UTC+2)	Uth 27', 51'	Report		Stadium: Wirsol Rhein-Neckar-Arena; Attendance: 30,150; Referee: Daniel Siebert

16 September 2017 4	Bayern Munich	4–0	Mainz 05	Munich
15:30 CEST (UTC+2)	Müller 11'; Robben 23'; Lewandowski 50', 77'	Report		Stadium: Allianz Arena; Attendance: 75,000; Referee: Sascha Stegemann

19 September 2017 5	Schalke 04	0–3	Bayern Munich	Gelsenkirchen
20:30 CEST (UTC+2)		Report	Lewandowski 25' (pen.); Rodríguez 29'; Vidal 75'	Stadium: Veltins-Arena; Attendance: 62,271; Referee: Marco Fritz

22 September 2017 6	Bayern Munich	2–2	VfL Wolfsburg	Munich
20:30 CEST (UTC+2)	Lewandowski 33' (pen.); Robben 42'	Report	Arnold 56'; Didavi 83'	Stadium: Allianz Arena; Attendance: 75,000; Referee: Christian Dingert

1 October 2017 7	Hertha BSC	2–2	Bayern Munich	Berlin
15:30 CEST (UTC+2)	Duda 51'; Kalou 56'	Report	Hummels 10'; Lewandowski 49'	Stadium: Olympiastadion Berlin; Attendance: 71,212; Referee: Harm Osmers

14 October 2017 8	Bayern Munich	5–0	SC Freiburg	Munich
15:30 CEST (UTC+2)	Schuster 8' (o.g.); Coman 42'; Thiago 63'; Lewandowski 75'; Kimmich 90+3'	Report		Stadium: Allianz Arena; Attendance: 75,000; Referee: Frank Willenborg

21 October 2017 9	Hamburger SV	0–1	Bayern Munich	Hamburg
18:30 CEST (UTC+2)		Report	Tolisso 52'	Stadium: Volksparkstadion; Attendance: 57,000; Referee: Marco Fritz

28 October 2017 10	Bayern Munich	2–0	RB Leipzig	Munich
18:30 CEST (UTC+2)	Rodríguez 19'; Lewandowski 38'	Report		Stadium: Allianz Arena; Attendance: 75,000; Referee: Daniel Siebert

4 November 2017 11	Borussia Dortmund	1–3	Bayern Munich	Dortmund
18:30 CET (UTC+1)	Bartra 88'	Report	Robben 17'; Lewandowski 37'; Alaba 67'	Stadium: Signal Iduna Park; Attendance: 81,360; Referee: Tobias Stieler

18 November 2017 12	Bayern Munich	3–0	FC Augsburg	Munich
15:30 CET (UTC+1)	Vidal 31'; Lewandowski 38', 49'	Report		Stadium: Allianz Arena; Attendance: 75,000; Referee: Markus Schmidt

25 November 2017 13	Borussia Mönchengladbach	2–1	Bayern Munich	Mönchengladbach
18:30 CET (UTC+1)	Hazard 39' (pen.); Ginter 44'	Report	Vidal 74'	Stadium: Borussia-Park; Attendance: 54,018; Referee: Manuel Gräfe

2 December 2017 14	Bayern Munich	3–1	Hannover 96	Munich
15:30 CET (UTC+1)	Vidal 17'; Coman 67'; Lewandowski 87' (pen.)	Report	Benschop 35'	Stadium: Allianz Arena; Attendance: 75,000; Referee: Guido Winkmann

9 December 2017 15	Eintracht Frankfurt	0–1	Bayern Munich	Frankfurt
15:30 CET (UTC+1)		Report	Vidal 20'	Stadium: Commerzbank-Arena; Attendance: 51,500; Referee: Harm Osmers

13 December 2017 16	Bayern Munich	1–0	1. FC Köln	Munich
20:30 CET (UTC+1)	Lewandowski 60'	Report		Stadium: Allianz Arena; Attendance: 75,000; Referee: Daniel Siebert

16 December 2017 17	VfB Stuttgart	0–1	Bayern Munich	Stuttgart
15:30 CET (UTC+1)		Report	Müller 79'	Stadium: Mercedes-Benz Arena; Attendance: 58,885; Referee: Patrick Ittrich

12 January 2018 18	Bayer Leverkusen	1–3	Bayern Munich	Leverkusen
20:30 CET (UTC+1)	Volland 70'	Report	Martínez 32'; Ribéry 59'; Rodríguez 90+1'	Stadium: BayArena; Attendance: 30,210; Referee: Daniel Siebert

21 January 2018 19	Bayern Munich	4–2	Werder Bremen	Munich
15:30 CET (UTC+1)	Müller 41', 84'; Lewandowski 63', 76'	Report	Gondorf 25'; Süle 74' (o.g.)	Stadium: Allianz Arena; Attendance: 75,000; Referee: Robert Kampka

27 January 2018 20	Bayern Munich	5–2	1899 Hoffenheim	Munich
15:30 CET (UTC+1)	Lewandowski 21'; Boateng 25'; Coman 63'; Vidal 66'; Wagner 90'	Report	Uth 3'; Gnabry 12'	Stadium: Allianz Arena; Attendance: 75,000; Referee: Manuel Gräfe

3 February 2018 21	Mainz 05	0–2	Bayern Munich	Mainz
15:30 CET (UTC+1)		Report	Ribéry 33'; Rodríguez 44'	Stadium: Opel Arena; Attendance: 34,000; Referee: Sören Storks

10 February 2018 22	Bayern Munich	2–1	Schalke 04	Munich
18:30 CET (UTC+1)	Lewandowski 6'; Müller 36'	Report	Di Santo 29'	Stadium: Allianz Arena; Attendance: 75,000; Referee: Tobias Stieler

17 February 2018 23	VfL Wolfsburg	1–2	Bayern Munich	Wolfsburg
15:30 CET (UTC+1)	Didavi 8'	Report	Wagner 64'; Lewandowski 90+1' (pen.)	Stadium: Volkswagen Arena; Attendance: 30,000; Referee: Sascha Stegemann

24 February 2018 24	Bayern Munich	0–0	Hertha BSC	Munich
15:30 CET (UTC+1)		Report		Stadium: Allianz Arena; Attendance: 75,000; Referee: Guido Winkmann

4 March 2018 25	SC Freiburg	0–4	Bayern Munich	Freiburg
18:00 CET (UTC+1)		Report	Schwolow 25' (o.g.); Tolisso 28'; Wagner 54'; Müller 69'	Stadium: Schwarzwald-Stadion; Attendance: 24,000; Referee: Frank Willenborg

10 March 2018 26	Bayern Munich	6–0	Hamburger SV	Munich
15:30 CET (UTC+1)	Ribéry 8', 81'; Lewandowski 12', 19', 90' (pen.); Robben 55'	Report		Stadium: Allianz Arena; Attendance: 75,000; Referee: Christian Dingert

18 March 2018 27	RB Leipzig	2–1	Bayern Munich	Leipzig
18:00 CET (UTC+1)	Keïta 37'; Werner 56'	Report	Wagner 12'	Stadium: Red Bull Arena; Attendance: 42,558; Referee: Marco Fritz

31 March 2018 28	Bayern Munich	6–0	Borussia Dortmund	Munich
18:30 CEST (UTC+2)	Lewandowski 5', 44', 87'; Rodríguez 14'; Müller 23'; Ribéry 45+1'	Report		Stadium: Allianz Arena; Attendance: 75,000; Referee: Bastian Dankert

7 April 2018 29	FC Augsburg	1–4	Bayern Munich	Augsburg
15:30 CEST (UTC+2)	Süle 18' (o.g.)	Report	Tolisso 32'; Rodríguez 38'; Robben 62'; Wagner 87'	Stadium: WWK Arena; Attendance: 30,660; Referee: Markus Schmidt

14 April 2018 30	Bayern Munich	5–1	Borussia Mönchengladbach	Munich
18:30 CEST (UTC+2)	Wagner 37', 41'; Thiago 51'; Alaba 67'; Lewandowski 82'	Report	Drmić 9'	Stadium: Allianz Arena; Attendance: 75,000; Referee: Robert Kampka

21 April 2018 31	Hannover 96	0–3	Bayern Munich	Hanover
15:30 CEST (UTC+2)		Report	Müller 57'; Lewandowski 73'; Rudy 89'	Stadium: HDI-Arena; Attendance: 49,000; Referee: Martin Petersen

28 April 2018 32	Bayern Munich	4–1	Eintracht Frankfurt	Munich
15:30 CEST (UTC+2)	Dorsch 43'; Wagner 76'; Rafinha 87'; Süle 90'	Report	Haller 78'	Stadium: Allianz Arena; Attendance: 75,000; Referee: Christian Dingert

5 May 2018 33	1. FC Köln	1–3	Bayern Munich	Cologne
15:30 CEST (UTC+2)	Süle 30' (o.g.)	Report	Rodríguez 59'; Lewandowski 61'; Tolisso 78'	Stadium: RheinEnergieStadion; Attendance: 50,000; Referee: Bibiana Steinhaus

12 May 2018 34	Bayern Munich	1–4	VfB Stuttgart	Munich
15:30 CEST (UTC+2)	Tolisso 21'	Report	Ginczek 5', 55'; Donis 42'; Akolo 52'	Stadium: Allianz Arena; Attendance: 75,000; Referee: Sascha Stegemann

=== DFB-Pokal ===
12 August 2017 First round	Chemnitzer FC	0–5	Bayern Munich	Chemnitz
15:30 CEST (UTC+2)		Report	Lewandowski 20', 60'; Coman 51'; Ribéry 79'; Hummels 89'	Stadium: Community4you Arena; Attendance: 15,015; Referee: Bibiana Steinhaus

25 October 2017 Second round	RB Leipzig	1–1 (a.e.t.) (4–5 p)	Bayern Munich	Leipzig
20:45 CEST (UTC+2)	Forsberg 68' (pen.)	Report	Thiago 73'	Stadium: Red Bull Arena; Attendance: 42,558; Referee: Felix Zwayer
	Penalties
	Bernardo (penalty scored); Kampl (penalty scored); Halstenberg (penalty scored); Orbán (penalty scored); Werner (penalty missed)		(penalty scored) Lewandowski; (penalty scored) Alaba; (penalty scored) Hummels; (penalty scored) Rudy; (penalty scored) Robben

20 December 2017 Round of 16	Bayern Munich	2–1	Borussia Dortmund	Munich
20:45 CET (UTC+1)	Boateng 12'; Müller 40'	Report	Yarmolenko 77'	Stadium: Allianz Arena; Attendance: 75,000; Referee: Sascha Stegemann

6 February 2018 Quarter-finals	SC Paderborn	0–6	Bayern Munich	Paderborn
18:30 CET (UTC+1)		Report	Coman 19'; Lewandowski 25'; Kimmich 42'; Tolisso 55'; Robben 86', 88'	Stadium: Benteler-Arena; Attendance: 15,000; Referee: Markus Schmidt

17 April 2018 Semi-finals	Bayer Leverkusen	2–6	Bayern Munich	Leverkusen
20:45 CEST (UTC+2)	L. Bender 16'; Bailey 72'	Report	Lewandowski 3', 9'; Müller 52', 64', 78'; Thiago 60'	Stadium: BayArena; Attendance: 30,210; Referee: Daniel Siebert

19 May 2018 Final	Bayern Munich	1–3	Eintracht Frankfurt	Berlin
20:00 CEST (UTC+2)	Lewandowski 53'	Report	Rebić 11', 84'; Gaćinović 90+6'	Stadium: Olympiastadion Berlin; Attendance: 74,322; Referee: Felix Zwayer

=== DFL-Supercup ===
5 August 2017 Final	Borussia Dortmund	2–2 (4–5 p)	Bayern Munich	Dortmund
20:30 CEST (UTC+2)	Pulisic 12'; Aubameyang 71'	Report	Lewandowski 18'; Bürki 88' (o.g.)	Stadium: Signal Iduna Park; Attendance: 81,360; Referee: Felix Zwayer
	Penalties
	Dembélé (penalty scored); Philipp (penalty scored); Aubameyang (penalty scored); Rode (penalty missed); Castro (penalty scored); Bartra (penalty missed)		(penalty scored) Lewandowski; (penalty scored) Ribéry; (penalty missed) Kimmich; (penalty scored) Rudy; (penalty scored) Vidal; (penalty scored) Süle

=== UEFA Champions League ===
==== Group stage ====
Pos	Team	Pld	W	D	L	GF	GA	GD	Pts	Qualification	PAR	BAY	CEL	AND
1	(France) Paris Saint-Germain	6	5	0	1	25	4	+21	15 (Note: Head-to-head results: Paris Saint-Germain 3–0 Bayern Munich, Bayern Munich 3–1 Paris Saint-Germain.)	Advance to knockout phase	—	3–0	7–1	5–0
2	(Germany) Bayern Munich	6	5	0	1	13	6	+7	15	Advance to knockout phase	3–1	—	3–0	3–0
3	(Scotland) Celtic	6	1	0	5	5	18	−13	3 (Note: Head-to-head results: Anderlecht 0–3 Celtic, Celtic 0–1 Anderlecht.)	Transfer to Europa League	0–5	1–2	—	0–1
4	(Belgium) Anderlecht	6	1	0	5	2	17	−15	3		0–4	1–2	0–3	—

Source: UEFA
Rules for classification: Group stage tiebreakers
Notes:

12 September 2017 1	Bayern Munich (Germany)	3–0	(Belgium) Anderlecht	Munich, Germany
20:45 CEST (UTC+2)	Lewandowski 12' (pen.); Thiago 65'; Kimmich 90'	Report		Stadium: Allianz Arena; Attendance: 70,000; Referee: Paolo Tagliavento (Italy)

27 September 2017 2	Paris Saint-Germain (France)	3–0	(Germany) Bayern Munich	Paris, France
20:45 CEST (UTC+2)	Dani Alves 2'; Cavani 31'; Neymar 63'	Report		Stadium: Parc des Princes; Attendance: 46,252; Referee: Antonio Mateu Lahoz (Spain)

18 October 2017 3	Bayern Munich (Germany)	3–0	(Scotland) Celtic	Munich, Germany
20:45 CEST (UTC+2)	Müller 17'; Kimmich 29'; Hummels 51'	Report		Stadium: Allianz Arena; Attendance: 70,000; Referee: Sergei Karasev (Russia)

31 October 2017 4	Celtic (Scotland)	1–2	(Germany) Bayern Munich	Glasgow, Scotland
19:45 GMT (UTC); 20:45 CET (UTC+1)	McGregor 74'	Report	Coman 22'; Martínez 77'	Stadium: Celtic Park; Attendance: 58,269; Referee: Danny Makkelie (Netherlands)

22 November 2017 5	Anderlecht (Belgium)	1–2	(Germany) Bayern Munich	Anderlecht, Belgium
20:45 CET (UTC+1)	Hanni 63'	Report	Lewandowski 51'; Tolisso 77'	Stadium: Constant Vanden Stock Stadium; Attendance: 19,753; Referee: Anthony Taylor (England)

5 December 2017 6	Bayern Munich (Germany)	3–1	(France) Paris Saint-Germain	Munich, Germany
20:45 CET (UTC+1)	Lewandowski 8'; Tolisso 37', 69'	Report	Mbappé 50'	Stadium: Allianz Arena; Attendance: 70,000; Referee: Cüneyt Çakır (Turkey)

==== Knockout phase ====
===== Round of 16 =====
20 February 2018 First leg	Bayern Munich (Germany)	5–0	(Turkey) Beşiktaş	Munich, Germany
22:45 TRT (UTC+3)	Lewandowski (yellow card) 38', (goal) 79', 88'; Müller 43', 66'; Coman 53'	Report	Vida (red card) 16'; Quaresma (yellow card) 33'; Pepe (yellow card) 62'; Tošić (yellow card) 90+3'	Stadium: Allianz Arena; Attendance: 70,000; Referee: Ovidiu Hațegan (Romania)

14 March 2018 Second leg	Beşiktaş (Turkey)	1–3 (1–8 agg.)	(Germany) Bayern Munich	Istanbul, Turkey
19:00 TRT (UTC+3)	Vágner Love 59'; Hutchinson (yellow card) 64'; Özyakup (yellow card) 71'	Report	Thiago 18'; Hummels (yellow card) 37'; Boateng (yellow card) 42'; Gönül 46' (o.g.); Rafinha (yellow card) 63'; Wagner 84'	Stadium: Vodafone Park; Attendance: 36,885; Referee: Michael Oliver (England)

===== Quarter-finals =====
3 April 2018 First leg	Sevilla (Spain)	1–2	(Germany) Bayern Munich	Seville, Spain
20:45 CEST (UTC+02:00)	Correa (yellow card) 15'; Sarabia 31'; Pizarro (yellow card) 90'	Report	Ribéry (yellow card) 13'; Bernat (yellow card) 34'; Navas 37' (o.g.); Thiago 68'; Müller (yellow card) 85'	Stadium: Ramón Sánchez Pizjuán; Attendance: 40,635; Referee: Daniele Orsato (Italy)

11 April 2018 Second leg	Bayern Munich (Germany)	0–0 (2–1 agg.)	(Spain) Sevilla	Munich, Germany
20:45 CEST (UTC+02:00)	Wagner (yellow card) 90+3'	Report	Mercado (yellow card) 2'; Nzonzi (yellow card) 11'; Banega (yellow card) 81'; Correa (red card) 90+2'	Stadium: Allianz Arena; Attendance: 70,000; Referee: Willie Collum (Scotland)

===== Semi-finals =====
25 April 2018 First leg	Bayern Munich (Germany)	1–2	(Spain) Real Madrid	Munich, Germany
20:45	Kimmich 28'; Ribéry (yellow card) 52'; Thiago (yellow card) 89'	Report	Marcelo 44'; Asensio 57'; Casemiro (yellow card) 78'	Stadium: Allianz Arena; Attendance: 70,000; Referee: Björn Kuipers (Netherlands)

1 May 2018 Second leg	Real Madrid (Spain)	2–2 (4–3 agg.)	(Germany) Bayern Munich	Madrid, Spain
20:45	Benzema 11', 46'; Modrić (yellow card) 62'; Vázquez (yellow card) 65'; Varane (yellow card) 88'; Casemiro (yellow card) 89'	Report	Kimmich 3'; Rodríguez 63'	Stadium: Santiago Bernabéu; Attendance: 77,459; Referee: Cüneyt Çakır (Turkey)

== Statistics ==
=== Appearances and goals ===
As of 30 May 2018

No.	Pos	Player	Bundesliga		DFB-Pokal		DFL-Supercup		Champions League		Total	
No.	Pos	Player	Apps	Goals	Apps	Goals	Apps	Goals	Apps	Goals	Apps	Goals
1	GK	(Germany) Manuel Neuer	3	0	0	0	0	0	1	0	4	0
2	FW	(Germany) Sandro Wagner	14	8	1	0	0	0	3	1	18	9
4	DF	(Germany) Niklas Süle	27	2	5	0	1	0	9	0	42	2
5	DF	(Germany) Mats Hummels	26	1	5	1	1	0	9	1	41	3
6	MF	(Spain) Thiago	19	2	3	2	0	0	10	3	32	7
7	MF	(France) Franck Ribéry	20	5	5	1	1	0	8	0	34	6
8	DF	(Spain) Javi Martínez	22	1	4	0	1	0	10	1	37	2
9	FW	(Poland) Robert Lewandowski	30	29	6	6	1	1	11	5	48	41
10	MF	(Netherlands) Arjen Robben	21	5	4	2	0	0	9	0	34	7
11	MF	(Colombia) James Rodríguez	23	7	4	0	0	0	12	1	39	8
13	DF	(Brazil) Rafinha	27	1	3	0	1	0	8	0	39	1
14	DF	(Spain) Juan Bernat	11	0	0	0	0	0	1	0	12	0
15	DF	(Germany) Lukas Mai	2	0	0	0	0	0	0	0	2	0
16	MF	(Germany) Meritan Shabani	1	0	0	0	0	0	0	0	1	0
17	DF	(Germany) Jérôme Boateng	19	1	3	1	0	0	9	0	31	2
18	FW	(Germany) Franck Evina	2	0	0	0	0	0	0	0	2	0
19	MF	(Germany) Sebastian Rudy	25	1	4	0	1	0	5	0	35	1
20	DF	(Germany) Felix Götze	0	0	0	0	0	0	0	0	0	0
22	GK	(Germany) Tom Starke	2	0	0	0	0	0	0	0	2	0
23	MF	(Chile) Arturo Vidal	22	6	4	0	1	0	8	0	35	6
24	MF	(France) Corentin Tolisso	26	6	5	1	1	0	8	3	40	10
25	FW	(Germany) Thomas Müller	29	8	5	4	1	0	10	3	45	15
26	GK	(Germany) Sven Ulreich	29	0	6	0	1	0	11	0	47	0
27	DF	(Austria) David Alaba	23	2	6	0	0	0	7	0	36	2
28	FW	(Ghana) Kwasi Okyere Wriedt	1	0	1	0	0	0	0	0	2	0
29	MF	(France) Kingsley Coman	21	3	5	2	1	0	6	2	33	7
30	MF	(Germany) Niklas Dorsch	1	1	0	0	0	0	0	0	1	1
32	DF	(Germany) Joshua Kimmich	29	1	6	1	1	0	11	4	47	6
36	GK	(Germany) Christian Früchtl	0	0	0	0	0	0	0	0	0	0
40	MF	(Germany) Fabian Benko	0	0	0	0	0	0	0	0	0	0
Players transferred out during the season
34	DF	(Austria) Marco Friedl	1	0	0	0	0	0	1	0	2	0
35	MF	(Portugal) Renato Sanches	0	0	0	0	1	0	0	0	1	0

=== Goalscorers ===
As of 19 May 2018

Rank	Position	Name	Bundesliga	DFB-Pokal	DFL-Supercup	Champions League	Total
1	FW	(Poland) Robert Lewandowski	29	6	1	5	41
2	FW	(Germany) Thomas Müller	8	4	0	3	15
3	MF	(France) Corentin Tolisso	6	1	0	3	10
4	FW	(Germany) Sandro Wagner	8	0	0	1	9
5	MF	(Colombia) James Rodríguez	7	0	0	1	8
6	MF	(France) Kingsley Coman	3	2	0	2	7
6	MF	(Netherlands) Arjen Robben	5	2	0	0	7
6	MF	(Spain) Thiago	2	2	0	3	7
9	DF	(Germany) Joshua Kimmich	1	1	0	4	6
9	MF	(France) Franck Ribéry	5	1	0	0	6
9	MF	(Chile) Arturo Vidal	6	0	0	0	6
12	DF	(Germany) Mats Hummels	1	1	0	1	3
13	DF	(Austria) David Alaba	2	0	0	0	2
13	DF	(Germany) Jérôme Boateng	1	1	0	0	2
13	DF	(Spain) Javi Martínez	1	0	0	1	2
13	DF	(Germany) Niklas Süle	2	0	0	0	2
17	MF	(Germany) Niklas Dorsch	1	0	0	0	1
17	DF	(Brazil) Rafinha	1	0	0	0	1
17	MF	(Germany) Sebastian Rudy	1	0	0	0	1
Own goal			2	0	1	2	5
Total			92	21	2	26	141

=== Clean sheets ===
As of 21 April 2018

Rank	Name	Bundesliga	DFB-Pokal	DFL-Supercup	Champions League	Total
1	(Germany) Sven Ulreich	12	2	0	3	17
2	(Germany) Manuel Neuer	2	0	0	1	3
3	(Germany) Tom Starke	2	0	0	0	2
Total		16	2	0	4	22

=== Disciplinary record ===
As of 25 April 2018

Rank	Position	Name	Bundesliga			DFB-Pokal			DFL-Supercup			Champions League			Total		
Rank	Position	Name	Yellow card	(yellow card) (yellow-red card)	Red card	Yellow card	(yellow card) (yellow-red card)	Red card	Yellow card	(yellow card) (yellow-red card)	Red card	Yellow card	(yellow card) (yellow-red card)	Red card	Yellow card	(yellow card) (yellow-red card)	Red card
1	MF	(Chile) Arturo Vidal	6	0	0	3	0	0	1	0	0	1	0	0	11	0	0
2	DF	(Germany) Jérôme Boateng	4	0	0	2	0	0	0	0	0	2	0	0	8	0	0
3	MF	(France) Franck Ribéry	3	0	0	1	0	0	0	0	0	3	0	0	7	0	0
4	MF	(Spain) Thiago	3	0	0	1	0	0	0	0	0	2	0	0	6	0	0
5	FW	(Poland) Robert Lewandowski	1	0	0	1	0	0	1	0	0	2	0	0	5	0	0
5	FW	(Germany) Thomas Müller	4	0	0	0	0	0	0	0	0	1	0	0	5	0	0
5	DF	(Brazil) Rafinha	4	0	0	0	0	0	0	0	0	1	0	0	5	0	0
5	MF	(Germany) Sebastian Rudy	2	0	0	1	0	0	0	0	0	2	0	0	5	0	0
5	MF	(France) Corentin Tolisso	3	0	0	0	0	0	0	0	0	2	0	0	5	0	0
10	DF	(Germany) Mats Hummels	2	0	0	1	0	0	0	0	0	1	0	0	4	0	0
10	DF	(Germany) Joshua Kimmich	1	0	0	1	0	0	0	0	0	2	0	0	4	0	0
12	MF	(Colombia) James Rodríguez	2	0	0	0	0	0	0	0	0	1	0	0	3	0	0
13	DF	(Spain) Juan Bernat	1	0	0	0	0	0	0	0	0	1	0	0	2	0	0
13	GK	(Germany) Sven Ulreich	1	0	0	0	0	0	0	0	0	1	0	0	2	0	0
13	FW	(Germany) Sandro Wagner	1	0	0	0	0	0	0	0	0	1	0	0	2	0	0
16	DF	(Austria) David Alaba	1	0	0	0	0	0	0	0	0	0	0	0	1	0	0
16	DF	(Spain) Javi Martínez	1	0	0	0	0	0	0	0	0	0	0	0	1	0	0
16	DF	(Germany) Niklas Süle	1	0	0	0	0	0	0	0	0	0	0	0	1	0	0
Total			41	0	0	11	0	0	2	0	0	23	0	0	77	0	0
