= 4F (company) =

Polish sportswear company

- Type: PLC
- Industry: Textile
- Founded: 2003; 23 years ago
- Headquarters: Wieliczka, Poland
- Area served: Europe, Asia
- Key people: Igor Klaja (CEO)
- Products: T-shirts, shorts, jackets, swimsuits, sandals, sports equipment
- Number of employees: 850
- Website: 4fstore.com

4F is a Polish clothing company established in 2003 and headquartered in Wieliczka, in southern Poland. The company is owned by OTCF S.A. whose other subsidiaries include brands like Outhorn and 4Faces. It offers sports, tourism and casual wear clothing as well as accessories. The brand currently operates 230 stores in East-Central Europe and its products are present in around 500 multi-brand stores in 40 countries.

4F manufactures a wide range of sportswear and casual wear products, such as t-shirts, shorts, jackets, swimsuits, sandals, flip-flops, bags and backpacks. The company's sports equipment includes ski suits and bicycle helmets.

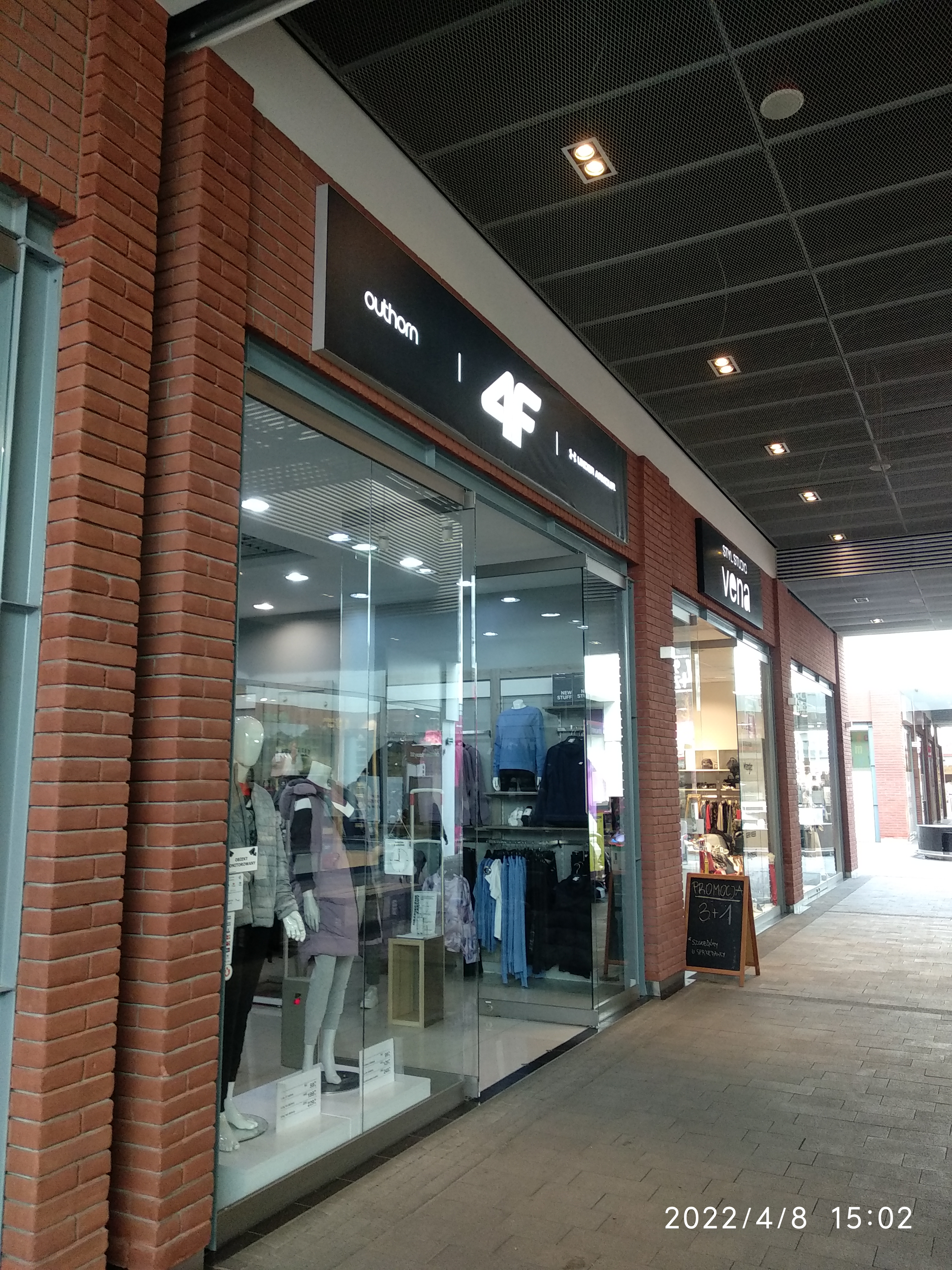
4F store in Poland

== History ==
In 2003, the Horn Partner company (currently OTCF S.A.) opened its first retail store offering sportswear under the 4Fun brand. In 2007, the company changed the name to 4F Performance, and since 2010 it has adopted the 4F name.

In 2008, it officially started cooperation with the Polish Olympic Committee (PKOl). The brand was selected to dress Polish athletes at the 2010 Winter Olympics in Vancouver, 2012 Summer Olympics in London, 2014 Winter Olympics in Sochi, 2015 European Games in Baku as well as 2016 Summer Olympics in Rio de Janeiro. It also provided sportswear clothing to young Polish athletes at the Youth Olympic Games in Singapore and Nanjing. Besides the PKOl, since 2010, the company has also been collaborating with the Polish Paralympic Committee.

4F cooperates with seven other national olympic committees and has dressed 9 national representations, including teams from Poland, Serbia, Croatia, Latvia, Greece, North Macedonia, Lithuania, Slovakia and Ukraine.

In 2016, 4F company opened its first stores abroad in Latvia, Slovakia, Romania and the Czech Republic.

The brand is also an official partner of such organizations as the Polish Ski Federation (2007), Polish Biathlon Association (2010), Polish Athletic Association (2013), Polish Speed Skating Association (2014), the Polish Handball Federation (2017) and the Slovak Biathlon Association (2018).

In 2018, the 4F company was unveiled as one of the official presenting sponsors of the Four Hills Tournament held in Germany and Austria for the next four upcoming editions of the event as well as the FIS Alpine World Ski Championships in 2021. The company also opened its first store in Asia in Bangkok, Thailand. In 2020, the company became one of the official global partners of the 7th edition of the Wings for Life World Run. The company also opened its first flagship store in Ukraine in Kyiv with two more openings planned by the end of the year.

During the global COVID-19 pandemic, the company shifted its focus to e-commerce with internet sale of its goods soaring by 114% constitting 16.5% of the total retail sale of the company in 2020. In September 2020, the company launched the sportswear collection designed by Anna Lewandowska. The collection was described as "promoting the image of modern femininity".

In 2021, the company had begun its cooperation with the Polish volleyball team ZAKSA Kędzierzyn-Koźle, the winner of 2020–21 CEV Champions League. From the last EuroBasket 2022, the company became the new official supplier of the Poland national basketball team played at home. In the same year also became the official supplier of the Poland national Athletics team. From the 2023/2024 season the brand also became the new official kit supplier of the Slovak basketball champion's BK Inter Bratislava team.

In 2023, the company opened its first two salons in Qatar and further expanded its presence on the Thai market by opening a second store in Bangkok. The company also launched its first concept store in Vilnius and eighth overall in Lithuania.

The company has been working on sustainable development and introduced the 4 Change strategy aimed at combating the negative effects of the textile industry such as fast fashion on the environment. It focuses on such aspects as promoting circular fashion and collaborating with organizations concerned with the protection of the environment. At the 2024 Summer Olympics in Paris, 4F became the official kit supplier of the Ukraine olympic national football team. In June 2024, 4F become the official kit supplier for Thai League 2 club Pattaya United. Since 2025, 4F also become the new official kit supplier of the Ukraine men's national volleyball team at the 2025 FIVB Men's Volleyball World Championship.

== Ambassadors of the brand ==
The list includes both present and former ambassadors of the brand:

- Iwona Bernardelli – long-distance runner
- Marcin Chabowski – long-distance runner
- Natalia Czerwonka – speed skater
- Paulína Fialková – biathlete
- Paula Gorycka – cyclist
- Jakub Grigar – slalom canoeist
- Monika Hojnisz – biathlete
- Maciej Kot – ski jumper
- Łukasz Kubot – tennis player
- Wilfredo Leon – volleyball player
- Robert Lewandowski – footballer
- Katarzyna Niewiadoma – cyclist
- Alina Rotaru-Kottmann – long jumper
- Kamil Stoch – ski jumper
- Bartosz Zmarzlik – speedway rider

== See also ==
- Sportswear
- Fashion industry
- Economy of Poland
