= Robert Lewandowski =

Polish footballer (born 1988)

- Lewandowski in 2026

Personal information
- Full name: Robert Lewandowski
- Date of birth: 21 August 1988 (age 38)
- Place of birth: Warsaw, Poland
- Height: 1.86 m (6 ft 1 in)
- Position: Striker

Team information
- Current team: Chicago Fire
- Number: 9

Youth career
- 1996–1997: Partyzant Leszno
- 1997–2004: MKS Varsovia Warsaw

Senior career*
Years	Team	Apps	(Gls)
2005	Delta Warsaw	17	(4)
2005–2006	Legia Warsaw II	13	(2)
2006	Znicz Pruszków II	4	(8)
2006–2008	Znicz Pruszków	59	(36)
2008–2010	Lech Poznań	58	(32)
2010–2014	Borussia Dortmund	131	(74)
2014–2022	Bayern Munich	253	(238)
2022–2026	Barcelona	134	(83)
2026–	Chicago Fire	19	(9)

International career^{‡}
2007	Poland U19	1	(0)
2008	Poland U21	3	(0)
2008–	Poland	172	(92)
Signature
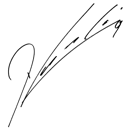
- * Club domestic league appearances and goals as of 00:15, 8 November 2026 (UTC) ‡ National team caps and goals as of 17 November 2026

Robert Lewandowski (Polish pronunciation: [ˈrɔbɛrt lɛvanˈdɔfskʲi]; born 21 August 1988) is a Polish professional footballer who plays as a striker for Major League Soccer club Chicago Fire and captains the Poland national team. Widely regarded as one of the greatest strikers of all time, he is one of only five players to have scored 100 goals with three different clubs, (Note: The other four players are Isidro Lángara, Romário, Neymar and Cristiano Ronaldo.) ranks third for the all-time top goalscorers in the UEFA Champions League with 109 goals, and ranks fourth for the all-time European men's top goalscorers in international football (92). He has scored over 750 senior career goals for club and country. In addition, he is also one of a select number of players who have amassed over 1,100 career appearances (the first Pole to achieve the feat, since the time matches are recorded).

Beginning his career in the third and second tiers of Polish football with Znicz Pruszków, Lewandowski moved to top-flight Lech Poznań, helping the team win the 2009–10 Ekstraklasa. In 2010, he transferred to Borussia Dortmund, where he won two consecutive Bundesliga titles and the league's top goalscorer award. In 2013, he also featured with Dortmund in the 2013 UEFA Champions League final. Ahead of the 2014–15 season, Lewandowski joined Dortmund's domestic rivals, Bayern Munich, on a free transfer. In Munich, he won the Bundesliga title in all of his eight seasons at the club and was integral in their Champions League win in 2019–20 as part of a treble. Lewandowski was widely expected to win the 2020 Ballon d'Or, but it was not awarded due to the impact of COVID-19. In 2022, he moved to Barcelona, where he won three La Liga titles, the Copa del Rey, and the Pichichi Trophy; his Pichichi Trophy win made him the joint-record holder for most top scorer awards in Europe's top five leagues with eight. Following his departure from Barcelona at the end of the 2025–26 season, Lewandowski joined Major League Soccer club Chicago Fire in June 2026.

A full international for Poland since 2008, Lewandowski has earned 172 caps, and was a member of their team at the UEFA European Championship in 2012, 2016, 2020, and 2024, and the FIFA World Cup in 2018 and 2022. Having captained the national team since 2014, he briefly retired in 2025, before returning and being reinstated as captain later the same year. With 92 international goals, he is the all-time top scorer for Poland. Lewandowski has been named the Polish Footballer of the Year a record thirteen times and the Polish Sports Personality of the Year three times.

Lewandowski won the Best FIFA Men's Player Award in 2020 and 2021. Further awards include the UEFA Men's Player of the Year Award in 2020, the IFFHS World's Best Player in 2020 and 2021, the European Golden Shoe for the 2020–21 and 2021–22 seasons, and the Gerd Müller Trophy in 2021 and 2022. He was runner-up for the Ballon d'Or in 2021. He is one of the most successful players in Bundesliga and Bayern history, being named the VDV Player of the Season (Silver Boot) a record five times and winning the Bundesliga Top Scorer Award in a joint-record seven seasons, among other records.

== Club career ==
=== Early career ===
"When I was six, I remember Roberto Baggio at the 1994 World Cup. When I was between 10 and 14, Alessandro Del Piero was the best player for me. Then my idol was Thierry Henry. He was amazing – it wasn't just how he scored the goals but what he did for the team."

— Lewandowski on his childhood role models

Lewandowski was born in Warsaw and grew up in Leszno, Warsaw West County. He took his first steps in football as an unregistered player for the local club, Partyzant Leszno. In 1997, he joined MKS Varsovia Warsaw, where as a teen he played for seven years. The following year he moved to fourth tier side Delta Warsaw, where he finally managed to play in the first team, scoring four goals at the end of the season.

In 2006–07, Lewandowski was the Polish third division's top goalscorer with 15 goals, helping Znicz Pruszków win the promotion. The next season, he was the top scorer in the Polish second highest division with 21 goals.

=== Lech Poznań ===
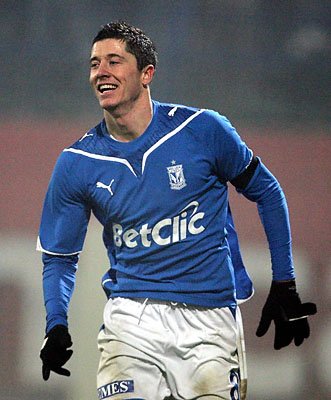
Lewandowski playing for Lech Poznań in 2009

In June 2008, Lech Poznań signed Lewandowski from Znicz for 1.5 million PLN. (398,670 Dollars, or 350,055 Euros) Earlier that month, Lewandowski's agent Cezary Kucharski offered him to his former team Sporting Gijón, which had been promoted to the La Liga, Spain's first division, after ten years in the Segunda División. However, Gijón rejected him.

He debuted for Lech on 17 July 2008 as a substitute in the first qualifying first leg match of the UEFA Cup versus Khazar Lankaran from Azerbaijan, in which he scored the only goal of the evening in the 75th minute at the Tofiq Bahramov Republican Stadium. During his Ekstraklasa debut in the first game of the season, in a match against GKS Bełchatów, he scored a heel flick goal just four minutes after coming into the game late second half. In his first season in the Polish top division, he was second in the goal-scoring charts. Lewandowski finished the season with 18 goals in 42 matches. He also scored in a 1–1 away draw against Wisła Kraków in the 2009 Polish Super Cup on 27 July, and converted his attempt in the won penalty shoot-out. The next season, he became the top scorer with 18 goals and helped his team win the 2009–10 championship.

English coach, Sam Allardyce, said that Lewandowski was about to join Premier League club Blackburn Rovers in 2010, but the volcanic ash clouds caused by the 2010 eruptions of Eyjafjallajökull which suspended all flights in and out of the UK, in addition to other financial worries, prevented the potential transfer. Moreover, Lewandowski was also about to join Italian club Genoa, before president Enrico Preziosi decided to cancel the transfer.

=== Borussia Dortmund ===
==== 2010–2012: League and cup double ====
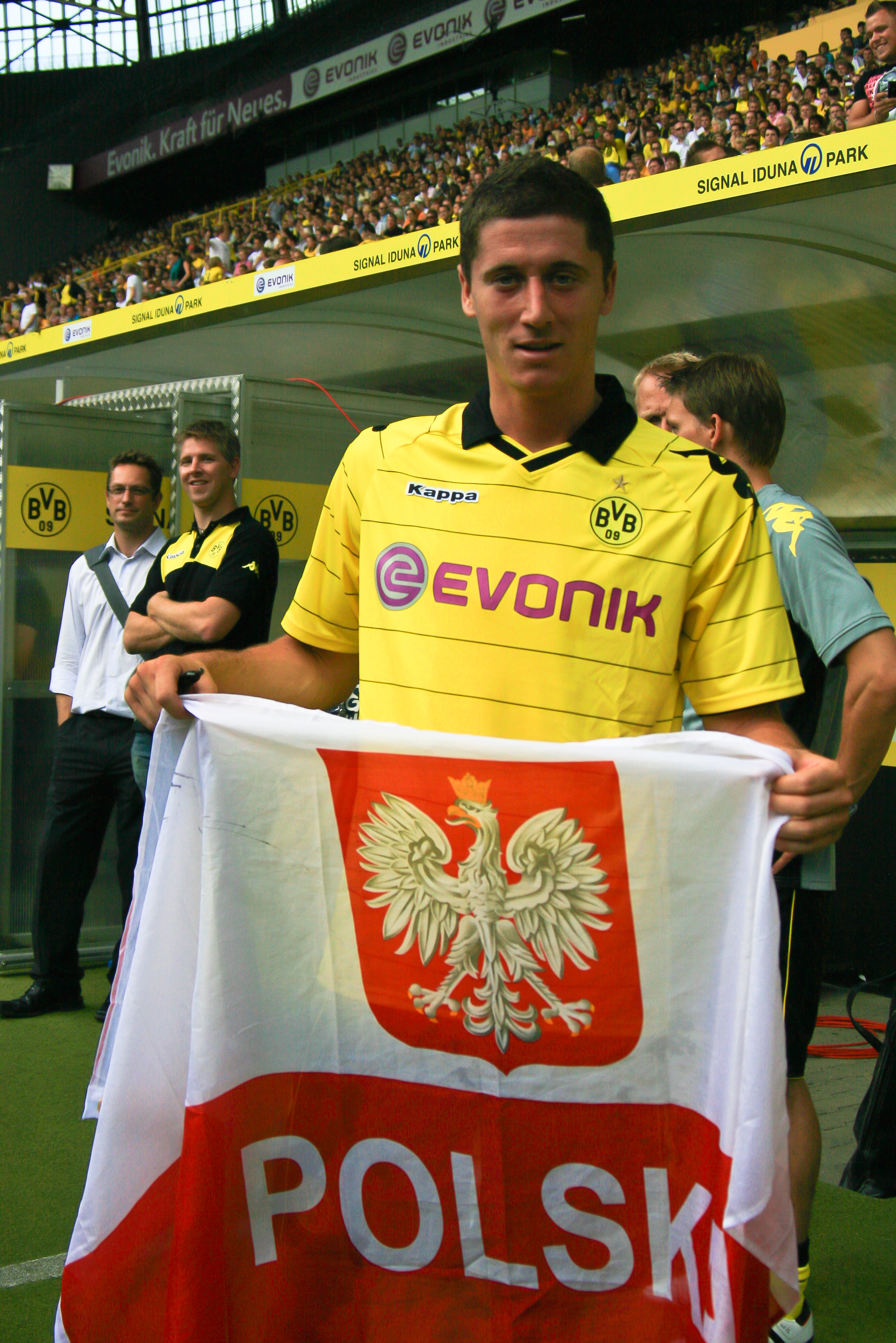
Lewandowski at Borussia Dortmund in 2010

Following press speculation that Lewandowski might move to one of a number of clubs, he joined Bundesliga club Borussia Dortmund in June 2010, signing a four-year contract with the German club for a fee reported to be worth around €4.5 million. On 19 September, he scored his first goal in the Bundesliga to make it 3–0 in the Revierderby against Schalke 04; the game ended 3–1.

In the 2011–12 Bundesliga campaign, Lewandowski profited from an injury to Lucas Barrios and he was elevated to an ever-present position in the starting XI until the winter break. The striker responded by finding the net two times in Dortmund's 3–0 DFB-Pokal first round victory over Sandhausen. Lewandowski opened his league account in a 2–0 win over Nürnberg on 20 August 2011 by providing the finishing touch from a Mario Götze cross. On 1 October, Lewandowski netted a hat-trick and provided an assist in the club's 4–0 victory over Augsburg, following a disappointing 0–3 loss to Marseille in the UEFA Champions League group stage. He later scored his first Champions League goal in a 1–3 away defeat to Olympiacos on 19 October. Dortmund climbed into second place in the Bundesliga with a comfortable 5–0 victory over Köln on 22 October, with Lewandowski finding the net either side of half-time. Dortmund travelled to Freiburg on 17 December and Lewandowski struck twice and provided an assist for Kevin Großkreutz, as Dortmund eased to a 4–1 triumph, scoring his first hat-trick in Bundesliga. Due to his strong performances, he was named Footballer of the Year in Poland.

Following the winter break, on 22 January 2012, Dortmund thrashed Hamburg 5–1 to move level on points with leaders Bayern Munich; Lewandowski netted twice and added an assist for Jakub Błaszczykowski in the rout. He scored in a 1–0 home win over Bayern Munich on 11 April. The result gave Dortmund a six-point cushion over their title rivals with only four games left to play. On 21 April, Lewandowski provided the assist for Shinji Kagawa's 59th-minute goal as Dortmund won 2–0 over Borussia Mönchengladbach to seal their second straight title. In the final Bundesliga game of the campaign, Lewandowski scored two first-half goals as Dortmund beat Freiburg 4–0 and celebrated lifting the title.

Lewandowski finished the year as the third top goal scorer with 22 goals, none from the penalty spot, and six assists.

On 12 May, in the final game of the season for Dortmund, he scored a hat-trick in the DFB-Pokal Final, a 5–2 win over Bayern Munich, to earn the club its first domestic double. Lewandowski finished as the DFB-Pokal's top goalscorer, with seven goals from six games.

==== 2012–2014: Champions League runner-up and league top goalscorer ====
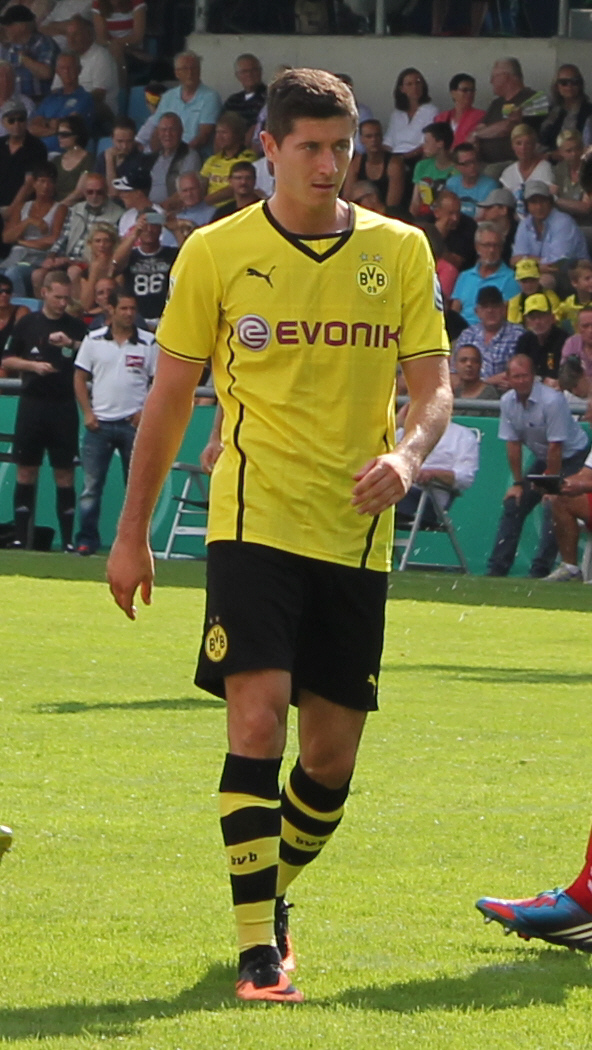
Lewandowski playing for Borussia Dortmund in 2013

On 12 August 2012, Lewandowski began the 2012–13 season by scoring in the 1–2 2012 DFL-Supercup defeat to Bayern Munich. He made his first appearance of the 2012–13 Bundesliga campaign in Dortmund's 2–1 victory over Werder Bremen on the opening day of the season.

He netted his first goal in a 3–0 victory over Bayer Leverkusen on 15 September 2012, extending Dortmund's run to 31 games unbeaten and moved the club into third in the Bundesliga. Three days later, in the club's first Champions League game of the season, Lewandowski scored an 87th-minute winner to defeat Ajax, 1–0. He set club's new record of the longest scoring streak, having scored in 12 consecutive league games, surpassing Friedhelm Konietzka's record from 1964–65 season.

On 9 February 2013, he opened the scoring in a home match against Hamburg, but was sent off in the 31st minute for a foul on Per Ciljan Skjelbred and Dortmund lost 4–1. According to Borussia Dortmund director Michael Zorc, speaking in February 2013, Lewandowski would not be renewing his contract with the club, and would leave either in the summer of 2013 or after the 2013–14 season. On 27 February, Lewandowski played in his side's 1–0 defeat to Bayern Munich in the 2012–13 DFB-Pokal quarter final. On 24 April, Lewandowski became the first player to score four goals in a Champions League semi-final as Borussia Dortmund defeated Spanish champions Real Madrid 4–1 in the first leg at Dortmund's Signal Iduna Park. On 25 May, he played in the 2013 UEFA Champions League Final in which Borussia Dortmund were defeated 1–2 by Bayern Munich. He finished the 2012–13 season with 24 league goals, one goal short of the Bundesliga's top scorer, Bayer Leverkusen's Stefan Kießling.

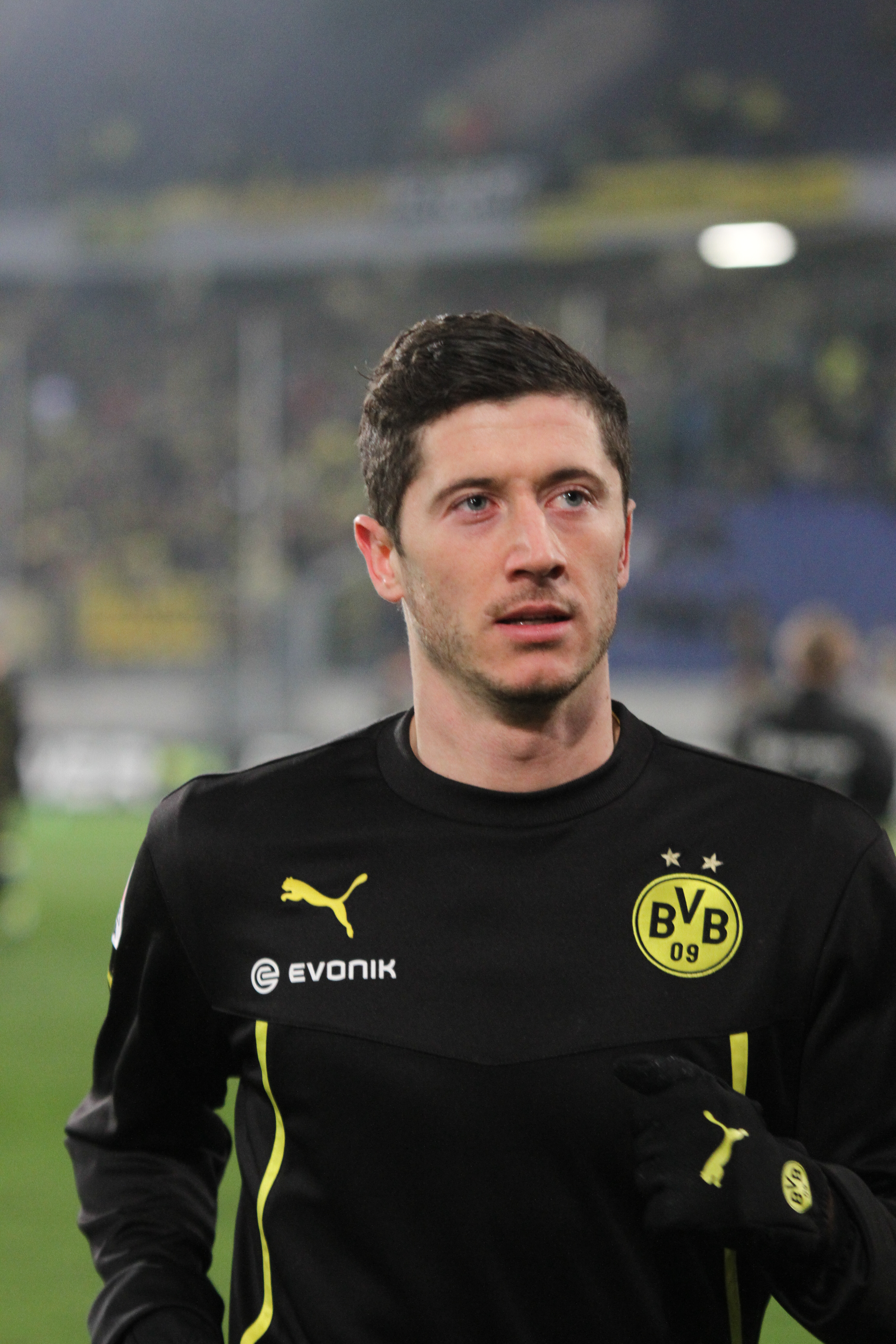
Lewandowski warming up for Borussia Dortmund in 2014

On 27 July 2013, Lewandowski won the 2013 DFL-Supercup with Dortmund, 4–2, against Bayern Munich. He scored his first goal of the season in Dortmund's 4–0 win over Augsburg in the club's opening Bundesliga match on 10 August. On 1 November, he scored his only hat-trick of the season in a 6–1 Bundesliga win against Stuttgart.

On 25 February 2014, Lewandowski scored twice in the Champions League round of 16 first leg against Zenit Saint Petersburg, becoming Dortmund's overall top scorer in European competition, surpassing Stéphane Chapuisat's 16 goals.

He scored his 100th goal for the club on his 182nd appearance, as Dortmund defeated VfL Wolfsburg 2–0 in the semi-finals of the 2013–14 DFB-Pokal on 15 April, and revealed a shirt with the number 100 during celebration.

Lewandowski ended the 2013–14 season as the top goalscorer in the Bundesliga with 20 goals, which earned him the Torjägerkanone. He also scored six goals in the Champions League, as Dortmund reached the quarter-finals. During the second leg of the round of 16 match between Borussia Dortmund and Zenit, Lewandowski received a second yellow card, which resulted in his suspension for the first leg of the quarter-final against Real Madrid.

Lewandowski played his final match for Dortmund in the 2014 DFB-Pokal Final against Bayern Munich on 17 May. Head coach Jürgen Klopp had excused him from some training ahead of the final due to injury concerns; although Lewandowski played all 120 minutes of the final, Dortmund lost, 0–2. He finished the season with 28 goals in 48 matches.

=== Bayern Munich ===
In November 2013, Lewandowski confirmed he would sign a pre-contractual agreement for Borussia Dortmund's rivals Bayern Munich, which officially happened on 4 January 2014, when he signed a five-year contract beginning at the start of the 2014–15 season. Lewandowski was officially presented as a Bayern Munich player on 9 July 2014.

==== 2014–2015: Third Bundesliga title ====
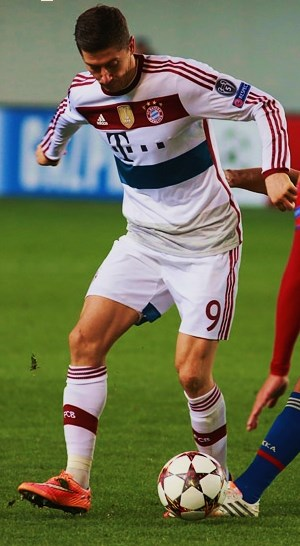
Lewandowski playing for Bayern Munich in 2014

Pre-season started on 9 July 2014 at which time he was presented. He made his pre–season debut against MSV Duisburg on 21 July, scoring a goal in the process. On 6 August, he opened the scoring as Bayern contested the 2014 MLS All-Star Game at the Providence Park in Portland, Oregon, eventually losing 1–2.

He made his competitive debut for his new club in a 0–2 loss to Borussia Dortmund in the 2014 DFL-Supercup on 13 August 2014, and scored his first goal in a 1–1 draw against Schalke 04 in his second league match on 30 August. On 21 October, Lewandowski scored his first Champions League goal for Bayern Munich in a 7–1 away win against Roma. On 1 November, in his first league match against Dortmund, Lewandowski scored in a 2–1 win which put Bayern four points clear at the top of the table while leaving his former club in a relegation play-off place. In his third match of the season against Dortmund on 4 April 2015, Lewandowski scored in the 36th minute in a 1–0 win, after Dortmund's goalkeeper Roman Weidenfeller "parried" Thomas Müller's shot.

On 21 February 2015, Lewandowski scored twice in Bayern's 6–0 win away at Paderborn, his second goal of the game was his 10th of the league season. He scored twice in the first half on 21 April as Bayern overturned a deficit from the first leg to defeat Porto 7–4 on aggregate and advance to the semi-finals of the Champions League. Five days later, after VfL Wolfsburg lost to Borussia Mönchengladbach, Bayern won the Bundesliga title. He scored again on 28 April, opening a 1–1 draw in the DFB-Pokal semi-final against Dortmund, but was later involved in a mid-air collision with Mitchell Langerak in the 116th minute of extra time. The game ended in Bayern's elimination via a penalty shoot-out (0–2), and, unusually, none of the four attempts were converted by the Munich side, at their own stadium. Although Lewandowski stayed until the end of the match, he didn't participate in the shootout; and tests later confirmed that he had fractured jaw and nose bone, and had a concussion, ruling him out for approximately one week. On 12 May, playing in a protective mask, he curled in at the 59th minute in his team's 3–2 home victory against eventual winners Barcelona in the Champions League semifinal second leg, albeit they were eliminated by an aggregate score of 3–5. With 17 goals in 31 games, Lewandowski was joint-second highest scorer of the Bundesliga season alongside teammate Arjen Robben, behind Eintracht Frankfurt's Alexander Meier. He finished the season with 25 goals in 49 appearances.

==== 2015–2017: Domestic success, Torjägerkanone, and 100 Bayern goals ====
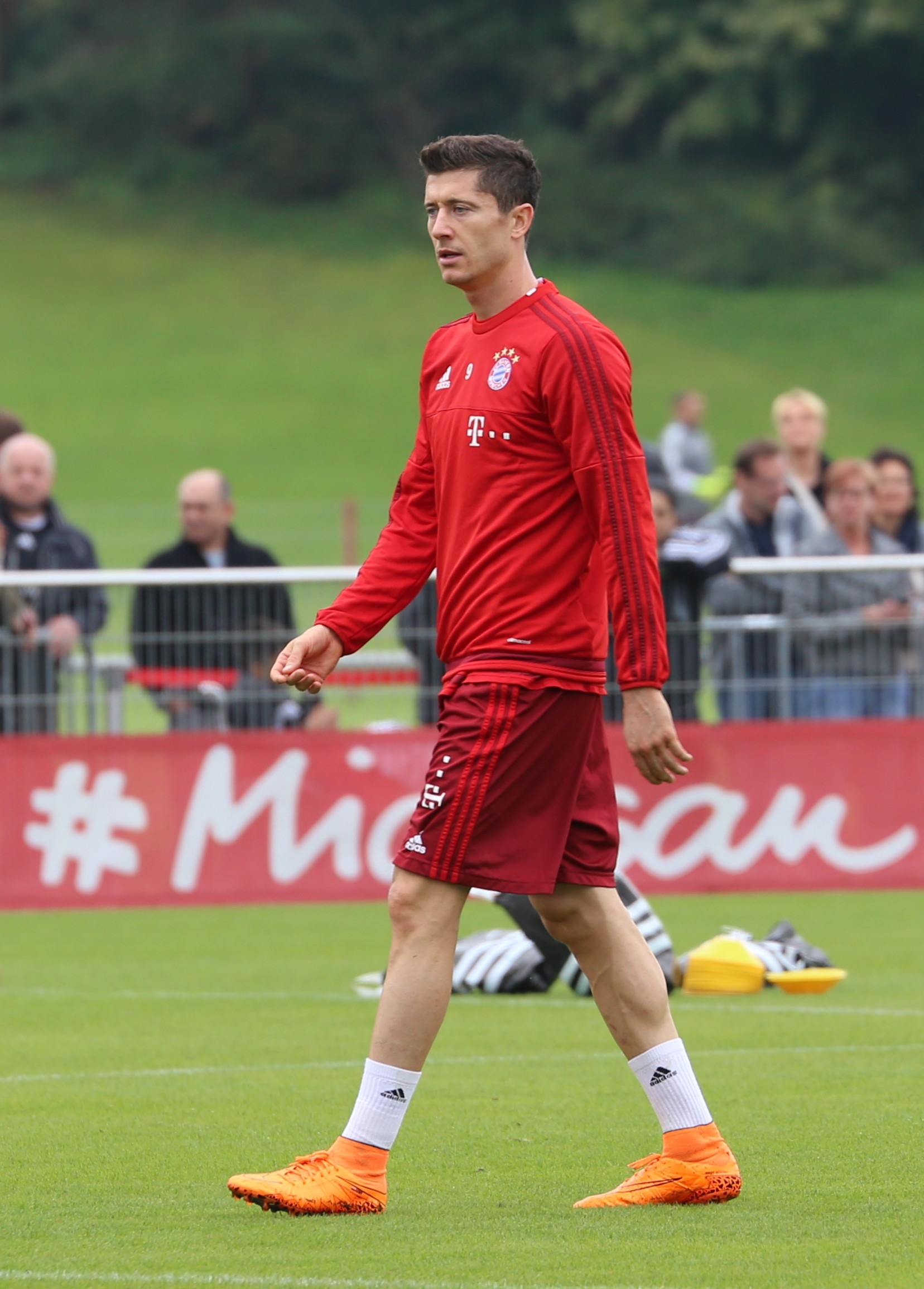
Lewandowski training with Bayern Munich in 2015

Lewandowski's second season began with the 2015 DFL-Supercup on 1 August, with Bayern losing in a penalty shootout away to VfL Wolfsburg; he had been substituted in the 72nd minute for Rafinha. Eight days later in the DFB-Pokal first round match, he scored the last goal in a 3–1 win against Oberliga Baden-Württemberg club Nöttingen. On 14 August, in the opening match of the new Bundesliga season, he scored the second goal of a 5–0 win over Hamburg.

On 22 September 2015, Lewandowski set a Bundesliga record by coming on as a substitute with Bayern trailing 0–1 to Wolfsburg and scoring five goals in 8 minutes and 59 seconds, the fastest by any player in Bundesliga history, to take a 5–1 lead. He also set Bundesliga records for the fastest hat-trick (three goals in four minutes), and most goals scored by a substitute (five). Lewandowski's five goals in nine minutes was also the fastest in any major European football league since Opta began keeping records, and it ended Wolfsburg's 14-match unbeaten run. He was awarded four certificates by Guinness World Records for this feat.

Four days later, he scored twice in a 3–0 win at Mainz, the first goal being his 100th Bundesliga goal on his 168th appearance, a league record for a foreign player. He also reached 10 goals in the opening 7 matches with this brace, a feat only achieved before by Gerd Müller. On 29 September, he scored a Champions League hat-trick in a 5–0 win over Dinamo Zagreb, putting him on ten goals in three games in a week. He added two in a 5–1 rout of Dortmund five days later, to total 12 goals in his last four appearances. On 24 October, Lewandowski scored in a 4–0 home win over Köln, a result which made Bayern the first Bundesliga team ever to win all 10 of their opening games of a season. The victory in Cologne was also Bayern's 1,000th win in the Bundesliga. On 11 January 2016, he achieved fourth place at the 2015 FIFA Ballon d'Or awards.

On 19 March 2016, Lewandowski scored the only goal in a 1–0 win against Köln to bring his league total up to 25 goals; a new personal best. He had scored 24 goals for Borussia Dortmund during the 2012–13 season. He also started Bayern's comeback with a 73rd-minute header in the second leg of the round of 16 on 16 March, after trailing 0–2 home to Juventus, which Munich eventually won 4–2 after extra time, and 6–4 on aggregate. His goal against Atlético Madrid on 3 May in the second leg of Bayern's Champions League semifinal exit saw him end the season's competition with nine goals.

On 7 May 2016, Lewandowski scored both goals for Bayern in a 2–1 win at Ingolstadt to confirm the Bavarian club as champions of Germany for the fourth consecutive season. A week later, he scored his 30th goal of the season in Bayern's final league match of the season at home to Hannover 96. This made him the first foreign player to score 30 goals in the Bundesliga, the first player since Dieter Müller in 1976–77, and secured him the Torjägerkanone for the second time in three seasons. He finished the season with 42 goals in 51 matches.

The 2016–17 season started with Bayern winning the 2016 DFL-Supercup on 14 August. Five days later, Bayern defeated Carl Zeiss Jena 5–0 in the DFB-Pokal first round, with the help of Lewandowski's hat-trick during the first half and assist to Arturo Vidal in the 72nd minute. He opened the 2016–17 Bundesliga season with another hat-trick in a 6–0 victory against Werder Bremen. On 13 December, Lewandowski signed a new contract with Bayern, keeping him at the club until 2021.

On 11 March 2017, Lewandowski reached 100 goals for Bayern in his 137th appearance for the club, scoring twice in a 3–0 victory against Eintracht Frankfurt in the Bundesliga. He finished the season with 42 goals in 47 matches.

==== 2017–2019: Consecutive Golden Boots and all-time foreign Bundesliga goalscorer ====
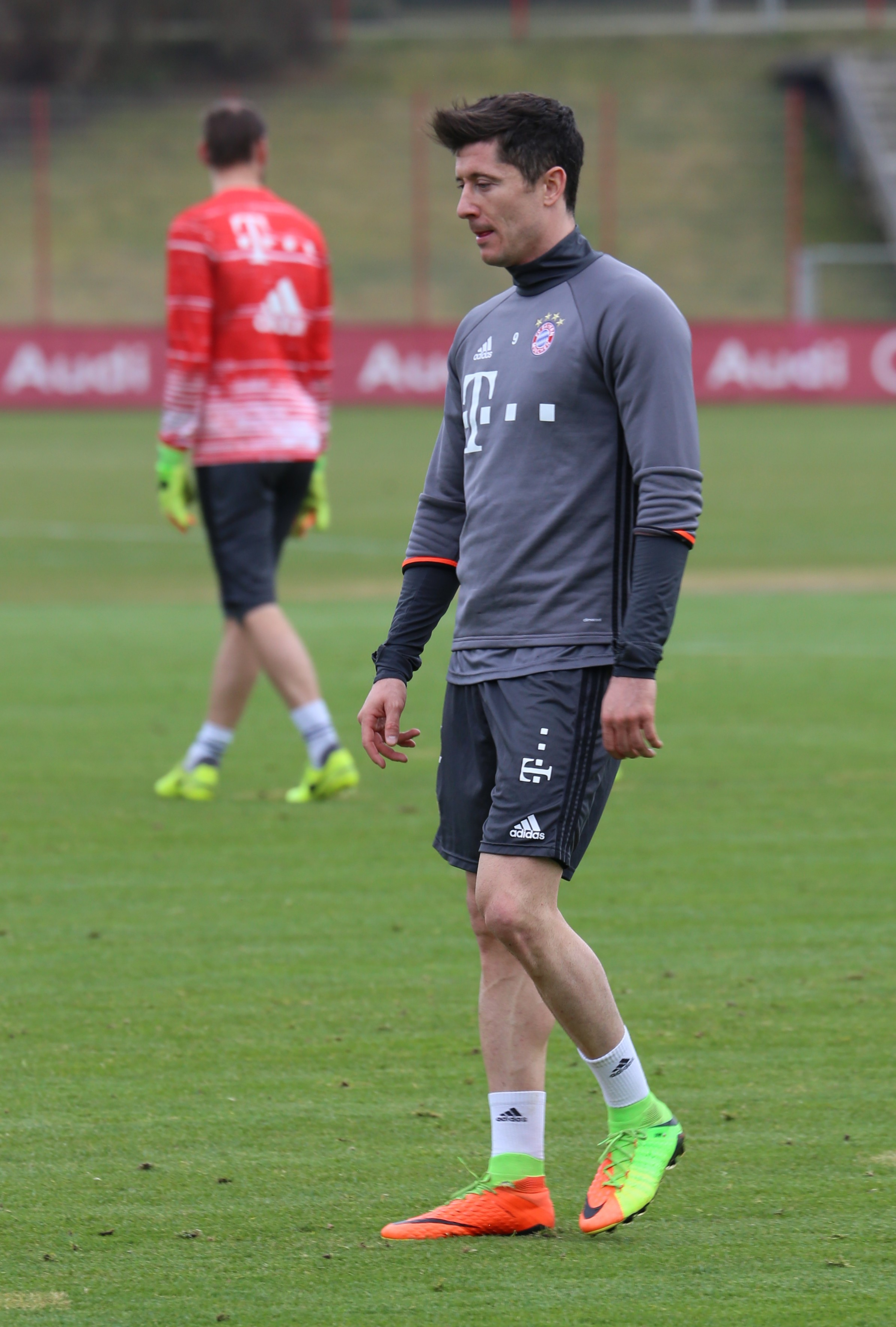
Lewandowski training with Bayern Munich in 2017

The season began with Bayern Munich winning the 2017 DFL-Supercup against Borussia Dortmund, in which Lewandowski scored the opening goal for the Bavarians by controlling a low cross from Joshua Kimmich to cancel out Christian Pulisic's opener. The match ended 2–2 after extra time. Lewandowski, again, scored the first penalty of the shootout as Bayern eventually won 5–4.

Lewandowski started from where he left in the last season and once again was the top scorer in the early stages of the 2017–18 Bundesliga. On 13 December, in the league fixture against Köln, he scored the only goal of the game, to reach Bundesliga's top ten goalscorers of all time. A couple of months later, on Matchday 22, Lewandowski again found the back of the net against Schalke 04 at the Allianz Arena to equal the record of scoring in 11 successive home games in a single season, a record also held by then Bayern manager Jupp Heynckes. He continued his goal scoring form by netting a hat-trick against Hamburg as the runaway leaders won 6–0, while he also missed a kick from the spot which would have been his fourth goal of the day. This was his first penalty missed for Bayern in the Bundesliga, nevertheless he scored the second spot kick to complete his hat-trick.

On 11 February 2018, he was voted Poland's Footballer of the Year for the seventh time in a row. On 22 February, he fired his long-time agent, Cezary Kucharski. Lewandowski hired renowned dealmaker Pini Zahavi as his new agent; the hiring of Zahavi was rumoured to be the start of Lewandowski trying to seal a summer move to Real Madrid. On 24 February, he played his 250th Bundesliga game against Hertha Berlin. On 19 May, Lewandowski scored Bayern's only goal in a 3–1 defeat in the DFB-Pokal Final against Eintracht Frankfurt.

Lewandowski finished the league as the Bundesliga's top goalscorer with 29 goals. This was the third time he won the Torjägerkanone award. He finished the season with 41 goals in 48 matches in all competitions.

On 1 August, after a summer of transfer speculation, Bayern CEO Karl-Heinz Rummenigge, confirmed in an interview that Lewandowski would not be allowed to leave Bayern at any price, saying "the top quality we have at Bayern Munich will stay here. With Robert, we clearly want to send a signal to people within and outside the club: Bayern Munich are completely different to other clubs who get weak when certain sums are mentioned" On 12 August, Lewandowski recorded the first ever hat-trick in the DFL-Supercup in a 0–5 away victory against Eintracht Frankfurt in the 2018 edition as Bayern Munich went on to win the title for the record seventh time. He also became the all-time top scorer in the German Supercup history.

On 27 November, Lewandowski became the third-fastest player to score 50 goals (after Lionel Messi and Ruud van Nistelrooy) in the Champions League, when he scored two goals in a 5–1 group stage home win over Benfica. It took Lewandowski just 77 Champions League matches to reach the milestone. He finished as the top scorer in the Champions League group stage with eight goals in six matches. On 9 February 2019, Lewandowski scored in a 3–1 win over Schalke 04 and became the first player to score 100 competitive goals at the Allianz Arena. His goal was also his 119th league goal for Bayern Munich, which saw him draw level with Roland Wohlfarth as the club's third-highest goalscorer of all-time.

He surpassed Wohlfarth the following month after scoring a brace in a 5–1 win over Borussia Mönchengladbach, with his second goal also seeing him equal Claudio Pizarro's record of 195 league goals for the most Bundesliga goals by a foreign player. In his very next fixture, he broke Pizarro's record by scoring twice in a 6–0 win over Wolfsburg. On 6 April, in the 100th Bundesliga meeting between Bayern Munich and Dortmund, Lewandowski scored twice in a 5–0 win, with his first goal taking him to 200 goals in the league.

Lewandowski ended the league campaign as the Bundesliga's top goalscorer with 22 goals for the fourth time. On 25 May, he scored a brace as Bayern won against Leipzig 3–0 in the 2019 DFB-Pokal Final. With his goals, he became the all-time top scorer in the DFB-Pokal finals with six, surpassing Gerd Müller on five. Lewandowski finished the season with 40 goals in 47 matches in all competitions, reaching the 40-goal landmark for the fourth consecutive season, also winning his second domestic double with Bayern.

==== 2019–2020: Treble, Best FIFA Men's Player, and UEFA Men's Player of the Year ====
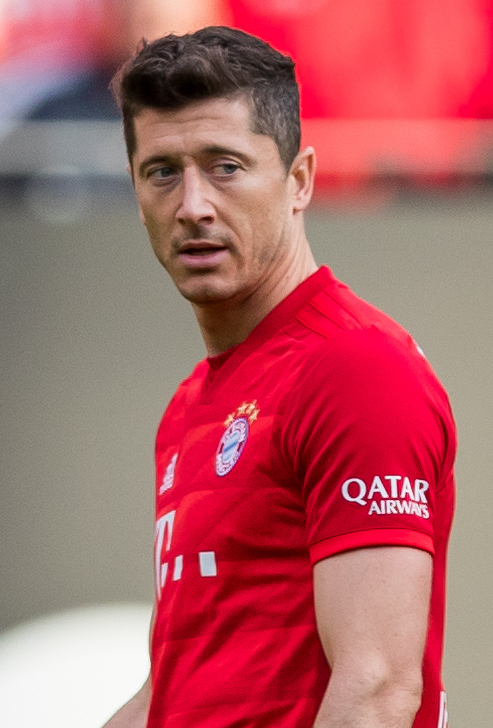
Lewandowski playing for Bayern Munich in 2019

On 12 August, Lewandowski scored his first goal of the season when Bayern defeated Energie Cottbus 3–1 in the first round of the DFB-Pokal. Four days later, he scored two goals in the 2019–20 Bundesliga opener against Hertha BSC. With his goals, Lewandowski set a Bundesliga record for scoring a goal in the season opener for the fifth year in a row. He then scored a hat-trick against Schalke at the Veltins Arena on 24 August, as the Reds won 3–0. On 29 August, Lewandowski extended his contract at Bayern until 2023. Lewandowski scored his 200th goal for Bayern in a 3–0 win against Serbian club Red Star Belgrade in the Champions League on 18 September. Later that month, after scoring his tenth goal of the campaign during a 3–2 win over Paderborn, he became the first player in Bundesliga history to achieve double figures for goals scored after the first six match rounds. Lewandowski then became the first player in Bundesliga history to score in each of the opening nine, ten and eleven matches of a season, surpassing the record of eight set by former Borussia Dortmund striker Pierre-Emerick Aubameyang. On 26 November, Lewandowski scored 4 goals in under 15 minutes as Bayern defeated Red Star Belgrade 6–0 in their reverse fixture and clinched first place in their Champions League group, setting a new record for fastest time to score four goals in a Champions League match. He also became only the second player ever to score four goals in multiple Champions League matches.

On 25 February 2020, Lewandowski equalled Cristiano Ronaldo's record of nine away goals in a season in Europe's top club competition. He did so by scoring a goal in a 3–0 win against Chelsea at Stamford Bridge (he also assisted Serge Gnabry twice in that match). On 10 August, Lewandowski scored a brace and provided two assists in a 4–1 win over Chelsea in the return leg. On 14 August, he assisted and scored in Bayern's 8–2 decimation of Barcelona in the quarter-finals. Lewandowski scored another goal, to be 15 goals in total, in his ninth consecutive Champions League match in Bavarian's semifinal 3–0 win against Lyon. His European scoring streak ended when he failed to score a goal in the Champions League final match against Paris Saint-Germain on 23 August; nevertheless, Bayern defeated PSG 1–0, giving Lewandowski his first Champions League title. He also became the second player ever to win the European treble while being the top scorer in all three competitions, repeating Johan Cruyff's achievement with Ajax from the 1971–72 season. However, Lewandowski was the first to do so as the sole top scorer in all three competitions.

==== 2020–2021: Ballon d'Or Striker of the Year and European Golden Shoe ====
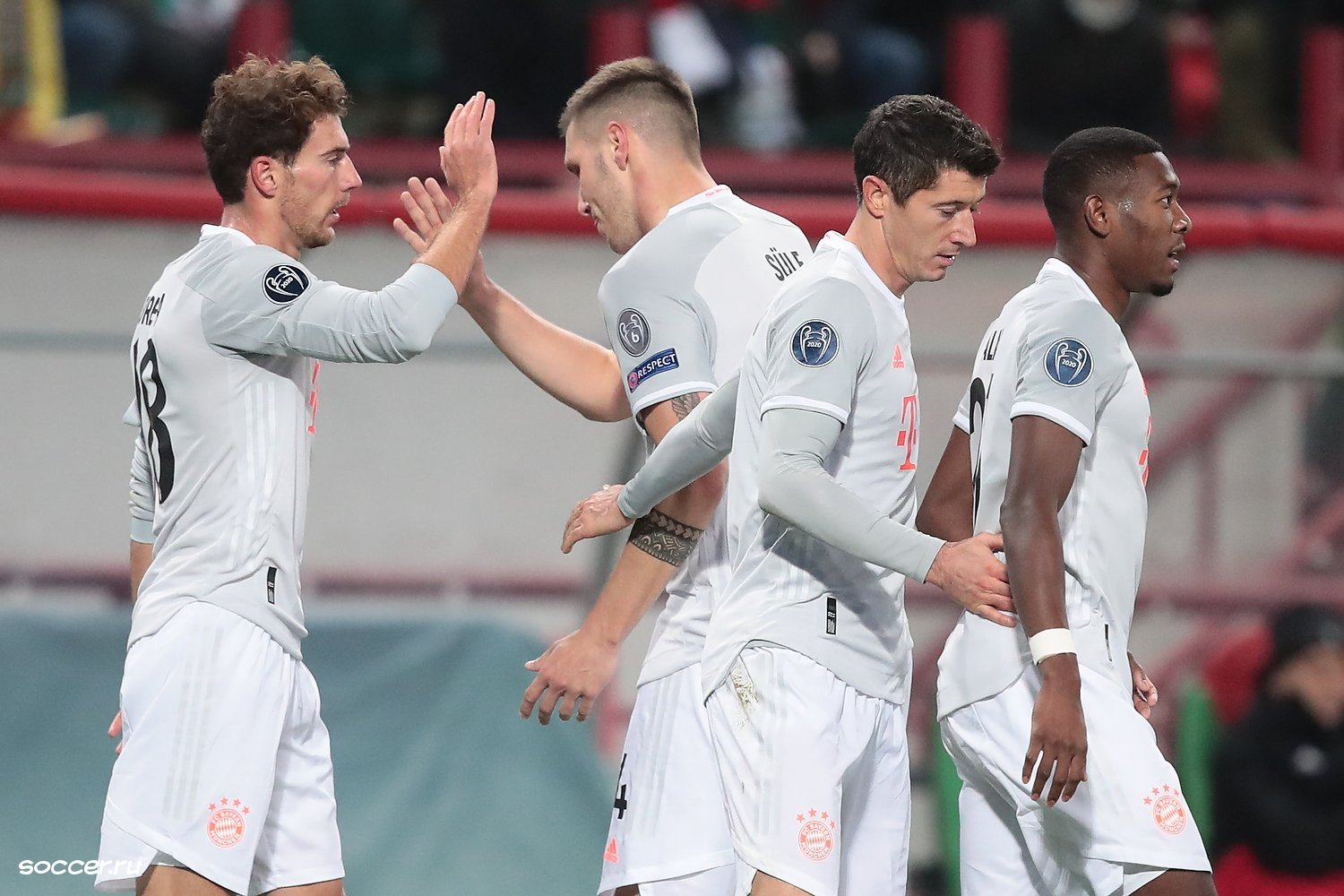
Lewandowski (second from right) with his Bayern Munich teammates during a Champions League match against Lokomotiv Moscow in 2020

On 18 September, in an 8–0 win over Schalke 04, in which Lewandowski scored a penalty, he provided a rabona assist to Thomas Müller, which was praised as the best of the season. On 24 September, Lewandowski assisted Leon Goretzka's opener in 2–1 victory over 2019–20 UEFA Europa League winners Sevilla in the 2020 UEFA Super Cup in Budapest. 6 days later, he played in Bayern's 3–2 win over Borussia Dortmund in the 2020 DFL-Supercup, to win their fifth trophy of the year. On 4 October, he scored all four goals in a 4–3 win against Hertha BSC. On 24 October, he scored a hat-trick in a 5–0 win against Eintracht Frankfurt, to become the first player in Bundesliga to score ten goals in only five matches. On 16 December, he scored a brace against Wolfsburg to be the third player to pass the 250-goal mark in Bundesliga, after Gerd Müller and Klaus Fischer. After winning the treble with Bayern Munich and his performances in the tournaments, he was named The Best FIFA Men's Player 2020 on 17 December, becoming the first Polish player to win the award. The cancellation of the 2020 Ballon d'Or was met with extensive criticism, as most news and sports organisations believed Lewandowski was the front-runner and should have won the award.

On 17 January 2021, Lewandowski became the first player in Bundesliga history to score 21 goals after just 16 games – a new Hinrunde record, beating Gerd Müller's 20 goals during the 1968–69 season. On 8 February, he scored a brace in a 2–0 win over Al Ahly in the 2020 FIFA Club World Cup semi-finals. On 11 February, he won the FIFA Club World Cup 2020 with the club after 1–0 win against Mexican top-flight club Tigres in the final, as Bayern became the second club ever (after Barcelona in 2009) to win the sextuple. He was also involved in Benjamin Pavard's winning goal, and was named player of the tournament. On 23 February, Lewandowski opened the score in a 4–1 win against Lazio in the first leg of the Champions League round of 16, reaching his 72nd Champions League goal and surpassing Raúl as the third highest goalscorer in the competition's history. On 6 March, he scored his 12th Bundesliga hat-trick in a 4–2 win over his former club Borussia Dortmund, to reach 31 goals in 23 matches. On 13 March, he scored a goal in a 3–1 away win over Werder Bremen, hence he became the joint-second on the all-time Bundesliga scoring list with 268 goals along with Klaus Fischer. On 20 March, he surpassed Fischer, as he scored a perfect hat-trick in the first half of a 4–0 win over VfB Stuttgart.

On 28 March, Lewandoski scored two goals in a 3–0 home win against Andorra in a World Cup qualification match, and also damaged ligaments in his right knee (he was taken off after 63 minutes); he missed both Champions League quarter-final matches against Paris Saint-Germain, in which Bayern Munich lost on away goals rule after a 3–3 draw on aggregate. On 24 April, he returned after almost a month on the sidelines in a 1–2 defeat to Mainz, where he scored in added time. On 8 May, he scored his 14th Bundesliga hat-trick in a 6–0 win over Borussia Mönchengladbach. On 22 May, he broke Gerd Müller's record of 40 goals in the 1971–72 season with a 90th-minute goal in Bayern's 5–2 win over Augsburg to reach his 41st goal on the final day of the season. He also managed to win his first European Golden Shoe award. Lewandowski finished the season with 48 goals in 40 matches in all competitions, reaching at least the 40-goal landmark for the sixth time.

==== 2021–2022: Final season with Bayern and second European Golden Shoe ====
Lewandowski kicked off his 2021–22 Bundesliga season with a volley-shot equaliser in a 1–1 opening fixture draw against Borussia Mönchengladbach on 13 August, making him the first player to score in seven consecutive Bundesliga opening games. He also scored a brace and backheeled to Thomas Müller in a 3–1 away win against Dortmund in the 2021 DFL-Supercup on 17 August. The match was preceded by a moment of silence for Gerd Müller, who died two days earlier. On 28 August, he scored his 15th Bundesliga hat-trick in a 5–0 win over Hertha Berlin, setting a new club and German record for the most consecutive appearances in all competitions with a goal at 16, surpassing the previous record of 15 held by Gerd Müller from 1969 to 1970. In addition, he managed to reach more than 300 goals with Bayern Munich in all competitions. On 18 September, Lewandowski scored in his 13th consecutive Bundesliga home match against VfL Bochum, surpassing the previous league record of 12 held by Gerd Müller (October 1969 to April 1970) and Jupp Heynckes (June 1972 to February 1973). He ended the streak for most consecutive appearances in all competitions with a goal at 19, the new all-time German record.

"You deserve your Ballon d'Or. Last year everyone agreed that you were the winner. Hopefully France Football can give it to you to have in your home, because you were the true winner if it weren't for the pandemic. You should have one in your house too."

— 2021 Ballon d'Or winner Lionel Messi on Lewandowski in his acceptance speech after the award was cancelled the previous year

On 21 November, Lewandowski scored a hat-trick against Benfica in a Champions League group stage match, becoming the fastest player to 80 UCL goals, in 100 appearances, edging past the previous record of Lionel Messi. On 23 November, he opened the score with a bicycle kick in a 2–1 away win against Dynamo Kyiv in a Champions League group stage match, thereby becoming the first player to score in nine consecutive games in two separate seasons of the competition. Midway through the season, Lewandowski finished second in the 2021 Ballon d'Or award, behind Lionel Messi of Paris Saint-Germain and received the Striker of the Year award by the France Football magazine. On 17 December, Lewandowski set the Bundesliga record for most goals in a calendar year with his 43rd goal. He became the second player, after Cristiano Ronaldo, to be the top goalscorer for club and country as a player playing in Europe for three consecutive years. His 69 goals in 59 games for club and country in 2021 matched Cristiano Ronaldo's best overall scoring year of 69 goals in 59 games for club and country in 2013.

On 15 January 2022, Lewandowski scored his 16th hat-trick and 300th Bundesliga goal in a 4–0 away win over Köln. On 16 February 2022, in a match against Red Bull Salzburg that ended in a draw of 1–1, Lewandowski's record streak of 22 consecutive winning Champions League matches ended. On 8 March, Lewandowski scored a hat-trick in a 7–1 win over Red Bull Salzburg in the second leg of Champions League round of 16. Coming inside the first 23 minutes of the match, Lewandowski's hat-trick becomes the earliest ever scored by a player from the start of a Champions League match. Taking just 11 minutes from first goal to last, Lewandowski's three-goal extravaganza against Salzburg also ranks as the quickest hat-trick ever scored in the knockout phases of the Champions League. With these goals he took himself beyond the 40-goal mark in all competitions for the seventh consecutive season. With the hat-trick, he also became the fastest player to 85 UCL goals, again edging past Lionel Messi's previous record. He also joined Cristiano Ronaldo and Messi as the only three players to have ten or more goals in three or more UCL campaigns, and joined Messi as the only two players who have scored a first half hat trick in a UCL knockout game. However, Lewandowski finished the league with 35 goals as top scorer for the fifth consecutive season and seventh outright, equaling the record of Gerd Müller. He also broke the Bundesliga record for most away goals in a single season with 19 goals. In addition, he won his second European Golden Shoe award for the second consecutive season.

On 30 May 2022, Lewandowski stated his desire to leave Bayern Munich, saying "My story with Bayern has come to an end, I cannot imagine further good cooperation... I hope they will not stop me (from leaving) just because they can. A transfer is the best solution for everyone." A year before his departure, Bayern Munich explored the possibility of signing Erling Haaland from Borussia Dortmund as a potential successor to Lewandowski. According to Sebastian Staszewski's biography Lewandowski. Prawdziwy, Lewandowski and his agent Pini Zahavi became aware of Bayern's interest despite Hasan Salihamidžić's reported denial, which allegedly affected Lewandowski's relationship with the club. Haaland later revealed that he had sympathized with Lewandowski, describing the situation as "disrespectful" given his achievements at Bayern.

=== Barcelona ===
==== Transfer ====
At Bayern Munich, Lewandowski established himself as one of the best players of his generation. On 16 July 2022, Barcelona confirmed they had reached an agreement with Bayern Munich for Lewandowski's transfer. Three days later, Lewandowski signed a four-year contract for a fee of €45 million, potentially rising to €50 million with add-ons. The contract included a release clause set at €500 million. Lewandowski became the most expensive Polish player in history and Bayern Munich's most expensive sale of all time. Lewandowski was formally unveiled in front of 50,000 fans on 5 August at the Camp Nou, and was handed the number 9 shirt, previously worn by Memphis Depay, and was officially registered on 12 August, amid speculation that the club could not register him as they were over the league's salary cap limit, due to their financial difficulties.

==== 2022–23: La Liga title and Pichichi Trophy ====
On 13 August, he made his competitive debut for the club in 0–0 draw against Rayo Vallecano in the league. On 21 August, he scored his first competitive goals for Blaugrana, netting a brace in a 4–1 victory over Real Sociedad on 21 August, followed by another brace against Real Valladolid in a 4–0 victory on 28 August. On 7 September, in his first game as a Barcelona player in Champions League, he scored a hat-trick in a 5–1 victory over Viktoria Plzeň, becoming the first player in history to score a Champions League hat-trick for three different clubs. On 11 September, he scored his sixth league goal of the season in his fifth league match for Barcelona, in their 4–0 win over Cádiz, setting the record for most goals in the first five La Liga games of the season in the 21st century, and eventually registered eleven goal contributions including nine goals and two assists in seven matches, after scoring the only goal of an away win over Mallorca on 1 October.

On 12 October, Lewandowski scored a brace in Barcelona's Champions League fixture against Inter Milan, with his last-minute equalizer securing a 3–3 home draw for the Blaugrana at Camp Nou. Despite scoring five goals in the competition, his goals were not able to help Barcelona, as they finished third in the group stage which put them in the Europa League knockout round play-offs for the second consecutive season. On 8 November, Lewandowski was sent off for the second time in his club career for a foul on David García, later receiving a three-game ban, as Barcelona won 2–1 against Osasuna. However, Lewandowski participated in the 1–1 tie against rivals Espanyol on 31 December after his ban was suspended by a court in Madrid, but still ended up serving the disqualification, as Spain's sports court upheld the punishment, missing the league matches against Atlético Madrid, Girona and Getafe.

On 16 January 2023, he scored the second goal in the 2023 Supercopa de España final, as Barcelona defeated Real Madrid 3–1 in El Clásico, winning his first title with the club. On 14 May, he scored two goals as Barcelona defeated Espanyol 4–2, confirming them as La Liga champions. He was the first Barcelona player to score more than 30 goals across all competitions in his debut season since Ronaldo Nazário in 1996–97. By the end of the 2022–23 La Liga season, Lewandowski won his first Pichichi Trophy with 23 goals in 34 matches, becoming the first player in top 5 European leagues to get top scorer award in six consecutive seasons. Lewandowski also tied Lionel Messi for most top scorer awards in top 5 European leagues with eight.

==== 2023–24: La Liga runner-up ====
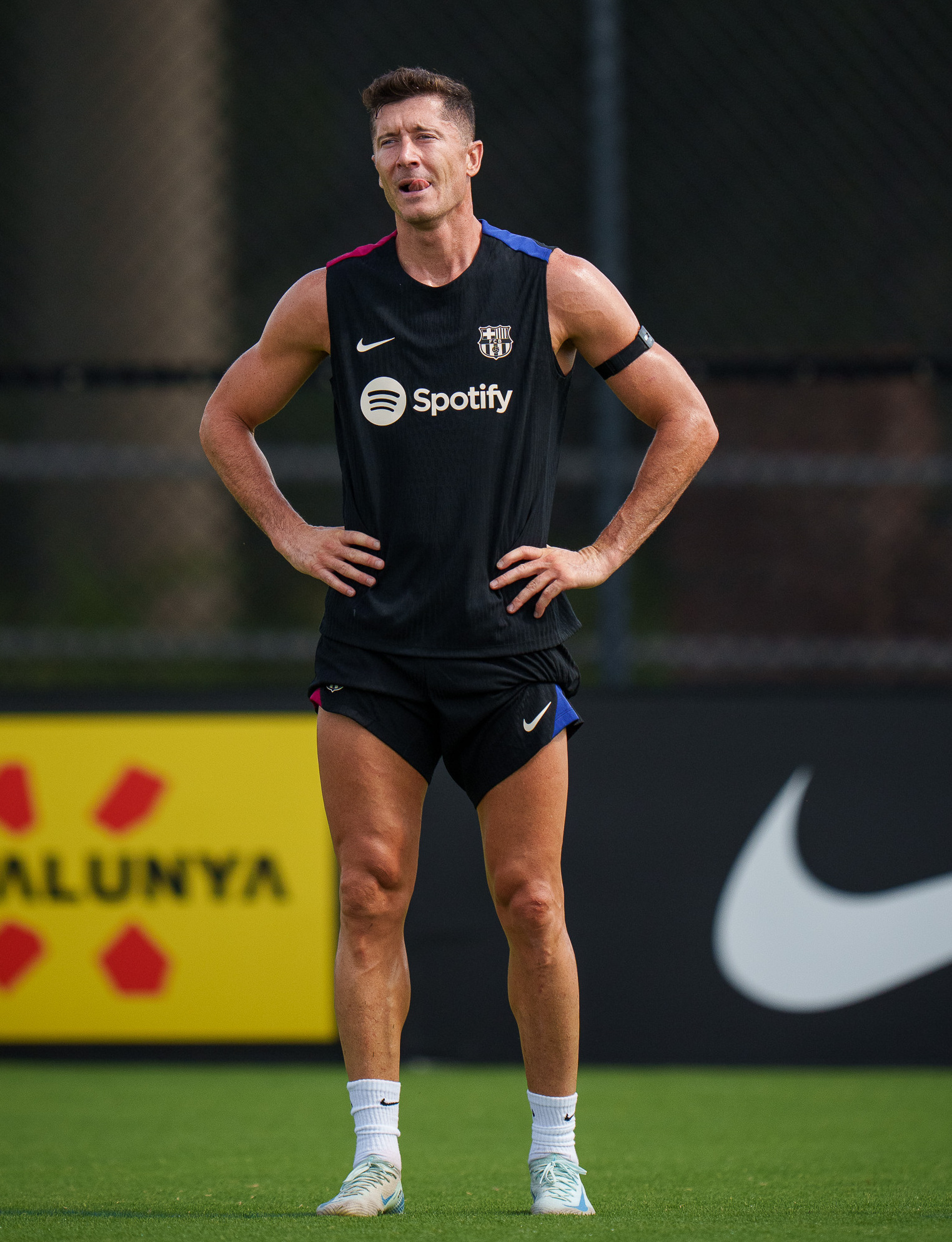
Lewandowski in 2024 during Barcelona's pre-season tour in the United States

On 19 September 2023, Lewandowski scored once in Barcelona's 5–0 home win over Antwerp in the first matchday of the 2023–24 UEFA Champions League to bring his UEFA competitions tally to 100 goals, becoming only the third player to reach such a milestone after Cristiano Ronaldo and Lionel Messi. He also became the oldest player, at 35 years and 29 days, to score for Barcelona in the UEFA Champions League, surpassing Gerard Piqué's previous record. On 23 September, he scored a brace to help Barcelona overturn a two-goal deficit in a 3–2 home victory against Celta Vigo, becoming the best scorer in first 50 matches for the club in 21st century, with 35 goals, surpassing the record previously held by Samuel Eto'o.

On 17 February 2024, Lewandowski secured a win for Barcelona in a 2–1 victory over Celta Vigo by converting a retaken 97th-minute penalty. He became the most successful footballer in terms of the number of goals scored (407) over the past decade in the top five major European football leagues. On 22 February, he scored his 93rd Champions League goal in a 1–1 draw against Napoli. Then on 12 March, Lewandowski scored the final goal in a 3–1 win in the home leg, knocking out Napoli with a 4–2 aggregate score. On 17 March, he was a key player in Barcelona's 3–0 win over Atlético Madrid having been involved in all three goals. He scored one goal and produced two assists helping his side move to the second spot in the La Liga table. On 29 April, he scored his first La Liga hat-trick to help his team get a 4–2 win against Valencia.

==== 2024–25: Domestic double and 100 Barcelona goals ====
On 17 August 2024, Lewandowski scored two goals in a 2–1 victory against Valencia. It was the first match of the La Liga season for Barcelona and the first game with former Bayern Munich manager Hansi Flick in charge as the coach. On 22 September, Lewandowski scored two goals in a 5–1 victory against Villarreal. On 25 September, he scored the winning goal in Barcelona's 1–0 victory over Getafe. This was Lewandowski's 49th goal scored in La Liga beating Jan Urban's record as the top scoring Polish player in La Liga history. On 6 October, he scored a hat-trick in a 3–0 victory over Alavés. On 20 October, Lewandowski scored two goals in a 5–1 victory against Sevilla, in the process, he overtook Gerd Müller's record and became the third highest scorer in the history of the five major European football leagues with 366 goals in total.

On 23 October, Lewandowski scored the second goal in a 4–1 thrashing of his former club Bayern Munich in the Champions League, but did not celebrate out of respect for Bayern. Then on 26 October 2024, Lewandowski scored the first and second goal in Barcelona's 4–0 away demolition of Real Madrid at the Santiago Bernabéu. He was subsequently chosen La Liga Player of the Month, his third such achievement. On 23 November, he scored against Celta Vigo in a match, which concluded in a 2–2 draw. By scoring this goal, Lewandowski recorded his 14th consecutive season in which he scored at least 20 goals for club, surpassing Lionel Messi's record of 13. Three days later, Lewandowski made history by netting a brace in Barcelona's 3–0 win over Brest, his first goal in the match being his 100th Champions League goal. He became only the third player to pass the 100-goal mark in the Champions League. On 7 December, he netted a goal in a 2–2 draw against Real Betis. By scoring the goal, Lewandowski reached 16 goals in his first 16 La Liga matches, equalling a record achieved by Messi during the 2018–19 season.

On 9 April 2025, Lewandowski surpassed Cristiano Ronaldo as the player with the most goals past the age of thirty-five in the Champions League, 14. He reached this feat against former club Borussia Dortmund after scoring a brace in a 4–0 victory over the German side. Those goal involvements also led him to his 99th Barcelona goal, and becoming the Man of the Match. He reached his 100th and 101st goals with the club in a 3–0 away win over Athletic Bilbao on the final matchday of the season. This made him join the small group of players to have scored 100 goals with three different clubs, and only the third player from the 21st century to do so after Cristiano Ronaldo and Neymar.

==== 2025–26: Third La Liga title and departure ====
On 22 November 2025, the thirteenth matchday of the 2025–26 La Liga, Lewandowski scored the inaugural goal at the partially rebuilt Spotify Camp Nou, having scored against Athletic Bilbao within four minutes in 4–0 victory. In December 2025, he claimed Barcelona had previously asked him to avoid scoring by the end of the 2022–23 title-winning season in order to prevent triggering a bonus payment to his former club Bayern Munich. On 21 January 2026, he scored a goal in a 4–2 victory over Slavia Prague, becoming only the fourth player to score in 15 consecutive seasons in the Champions League after Lionel Messi and Karim Benzema with 18 each and Cristiano Ronaldo with 16. On 7 February 2026, after scoring a goal in a 3–0 win against Mallorca, Lewandowski became the third player in the 21st century, after Ronaldo and Messi, to score at least 10 goals in Europe's top five leagues for 15 consecutive seasons. On 18 March 2026, Lewandowski scored a brace in a 7–2 victory over Newcastle United during the Champions League round of 16, setting a new record by scoring against 41 different opponents in the tournament and surpassing the previous mark held by Lionel Messi. He also became the oldest player to score in a Champions League knockout phase match at the age of 37 years and 209 days and the oldest player to score multiple goals in a Champions League match. A month later, on 25 April, he provided an assist in a 2–0 away win over Getafe, becoming the oldest player to reach 100 La Liga goal involvements (81 goals and 19 assists) in the 21st century, aged 37 years and 247 days.

Lewandowski eventually won his third La Liga title with Barcelona, reaching a total of 14 league titles, including 13 in top five leagues, equaling the record of Ryan Giggs, Thomas Müller, Manuel Neuer and Kingsley Coman. On 16 May, he announced that he would depart the club at the end of the season.

=== Chicago Fire ===
On 29 June 2026, Lewandowski signed with Major League Soccer club Chicago Fire, agreeing a contract running until 2028. A month later, on 22 July, he made his debut in a 3–2 away defeat against Inter Miami. On 1 August, he scored his first goals, netting a brace in a 2–1 victory over Charlotte FC.

== International career ==
=== 2007–2013: Youth level and early international career ===
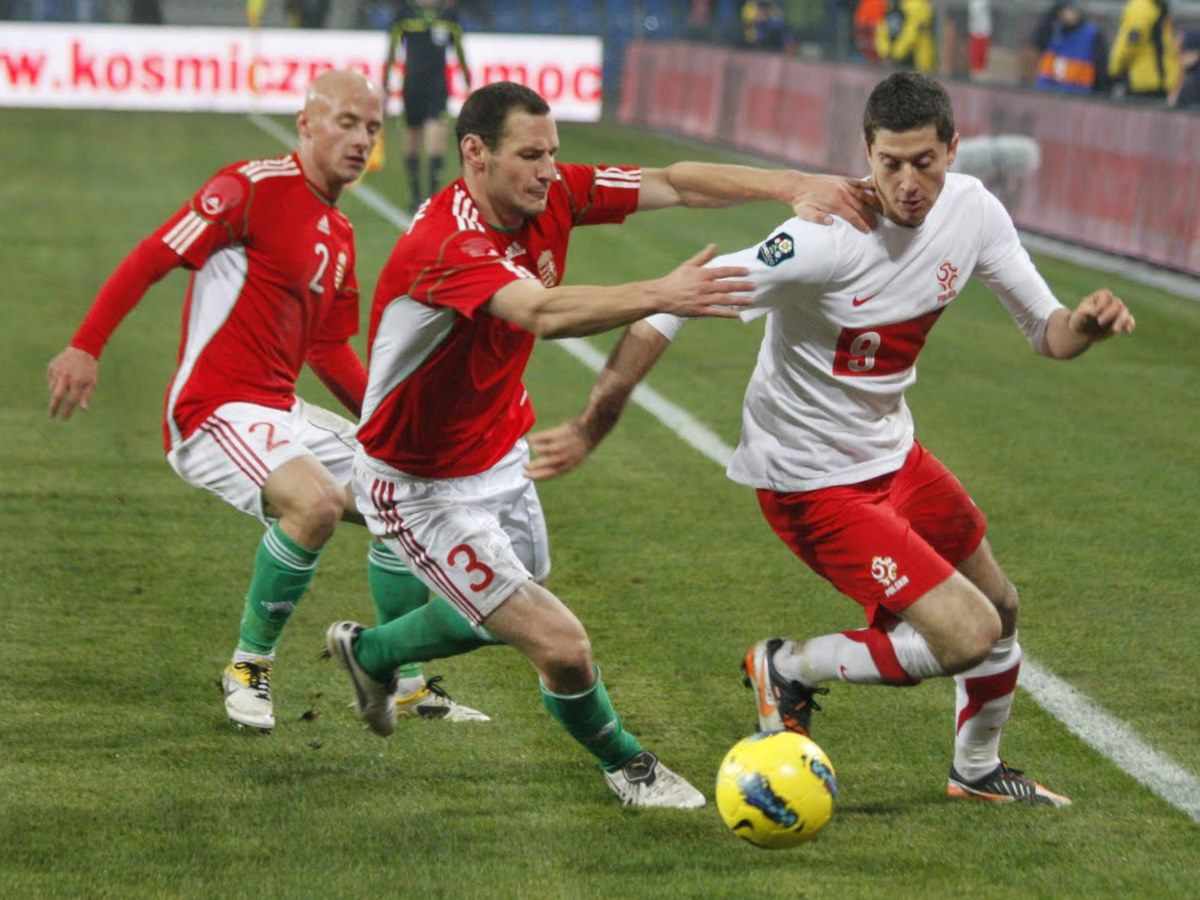
Lewandowski taking on József Varga and Vilmos Vanczák of Hungary during a friendly match in 2011

Lewandowski began his international career with Poland under-19 in 2007. He would also make three appearances for Poland's U21 team, in friendly matches against England, Belarus and Finland.

His debut for the senior national team came on 10 September 2008, three weeks after his 20th birthday, against San Marino where he came on as a substitute and scored a goal in a 2–0 away win in 2010 FIFA World Cup qualification. Only Włodzimierz Lubański scored a goal on his debut for the national team at a younger age than Lewandowski, having been 16 at the time. Lewandowski scored another qualifying goal against the same team on 1 April 2009, in a 10–0 victory.

Playing in Warsaw in the opening match of the UEFA Euro 2012 tournament against Greece, Lewandowski scored the first goal of the competition after an assist from then Dortmund teammate Jakub Błaszczykowski and was named Man of the Match. He played in all three games for Poland in the tournament, as the co-hosts crashed out of the group stage with two points earned.

=== 2013–2017: Assuming captaincy ===
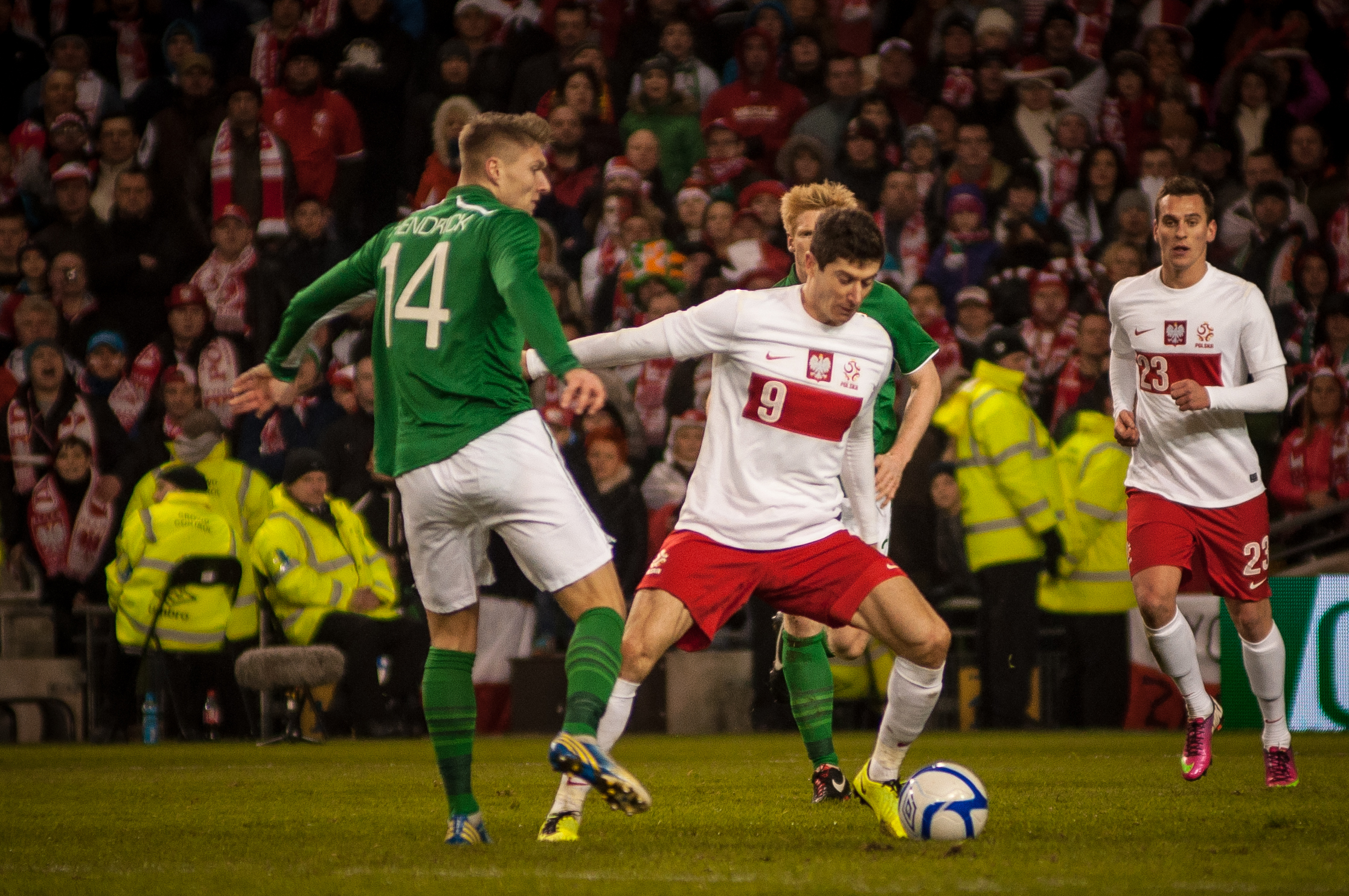
Lewandowski playing for Poland against Ireland in 2013

Lewandowski scored two penalties in the 5–0 win against San Marino on 26 March 2013 during the 2014 World Cup qualifying campaign, his first match as captain. Later on in the campaign, on 6 September, he scored the equaliser against Montenegro in a 1–1 home draw. Poland did not qualify for the 2014 World Cup in Brazil.

On 7 September 2014, in Poland's first UEFA Euro 2016 qualifier, away against Gibraltar, Lewandowski scored his first international hat-trick, netting four goals in a 7–0 win. On 13 June 2015, he scored another hat-trick in Poland's 4–0 defeat of Georgia, with the three goals scored within the space of four minutes. On 8 October, he scored twice in a 2–2 draw away to Scotland, opening and equalising with the last kick of the game to eliminate the hosts. Three days later he headed the winner in a 2–1 victory against the Republic of Ireland, qualifying Poland for the tournament finals in France. Lewandowski ended the campaign with 13 goals, a joint European Championships qualifying record with David Healy's tally for Northern Ireland in UEFA Euro 2008 qualifying.

At UEFA Euro 2016 in France, Lewandowski did not have a shot on target until the last-16 match against Switzerland in Saint-Étienne. Following the 1–1 draw, he scored his team's first attempt in the penalty shootout victory that sent them to the quarter-finals for the first time. In the 100th second of the quarter-final against Portugal at the Stade Vélodrome, he finished Kamil Grosicki's cross to open another 1–1 draw, and again scored in the shootout although the Poles lost. At the time of Poland's exit, Lewandowski had suffered more fouls than any other player in the tournament.

=== 2017–2026: All-time Poland top scorer, short-lived retirement ===
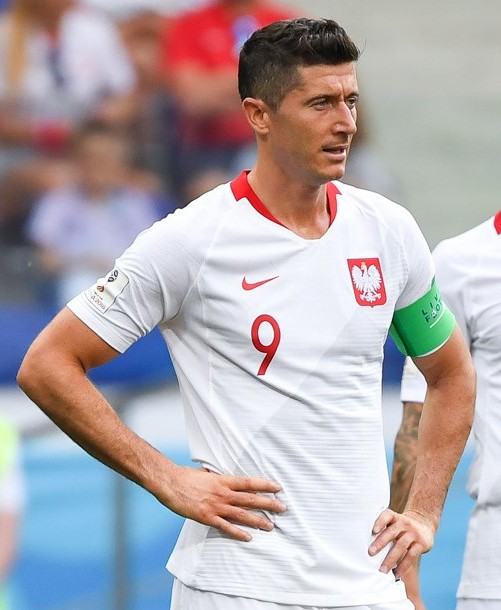
Lewandowski playing for Poland at the 2018 FIFA World Cup

On 5 October 2017, Lewandowski scored a hat-trick in a 6–1 victory against Armenia to take his tally to 50 goals for Poland, surpassing the previous record of 48 goals set by Włodzimierz Lubański to become the all-time top scorer for Poland. On 8 October, Lewandowski scored a goal in a 4–2 victory against Montenegro, taking his tally to 51 goals for Poland. He finished the 2018 FIFA World Cup qualification campaign with a total of 16 goals, a record for a European World Cup qualification.

Lewandowski was called up to the 23-man Polish squad for the 2018 FIFA World Cup in Russia. Lewandowski played every minute in all three matches against Senegal, Colombia, and Japan. He did not score any goals and Poland failed to qualify for the knockout phase.

On 19 June 2021, in Poland's second group stage match of UEFA Euro 2020 against Spain, Lewandowski scored the equalising goal in a 1–1 draw. He became the first Polish player to score in three consecutive European Championships. On 23 June, he scored a brace in a 3–2 defeat against Sweden, but Poland finished last in their group and were knocked out in the group stage.

Lewandowski was selected for the national squad ahead of the 2022 FIFA World Cup in Qatar. During the first match against Mexico, he missed a penalty in an eventual scoreless draw. However, in the second match against Saudi Arabia, Lewandowski scored his first FIFA World Cup goal in a 2–0 Poland win. He scored his second World Cup goal on a penalty in a 3–1 loss against France in the round of 16.

In June 2024, Lewandowski was named in the final 26-man squad for UEFA Euro 2024 in Germany. In Poland's third group stage game, he converted a penalty kick to equalize in a 1–1 draw against France, but Poland exited the tournament after finishing at the bottom of their group.

Lewandowski was not called up for two June 2025 matches against Moldova and Finland, citing exhaustion after the end of the club season. On 8 June, following the decision of head coach Michał Probierz to name Piotr Zieliński new captain of the Poland national team, Lewandowski announced he would not play for the national team as long as Probierz was the manager. Following Lewandowski's remarks and Poland's defeat against Finland in the 2026 World Cup qualifiers, Probierz resigned.

Following the appointment of Jan Urban as Poland manager on 16 July 2025, reports of Lewandowski's national team return ahead of the September matches against the Netherlands and Finland surfaced. In August 2025, he was selected for the September games and reinstated as Poland's captain.

After a 3–2 away loss against Sweden in the 2026 World Cup play-offs final on 31 March 2026, Lewandowski strongly hinted at retiring from international football following Poland's failure to qualify for the 2026 World Cup. Nevertheless, Lewandowski featured in Poland's friendly matches against Ukraine and Nigeria two months later, losing the former, drawing the latter, and scoring in neither.

== Style of play ==
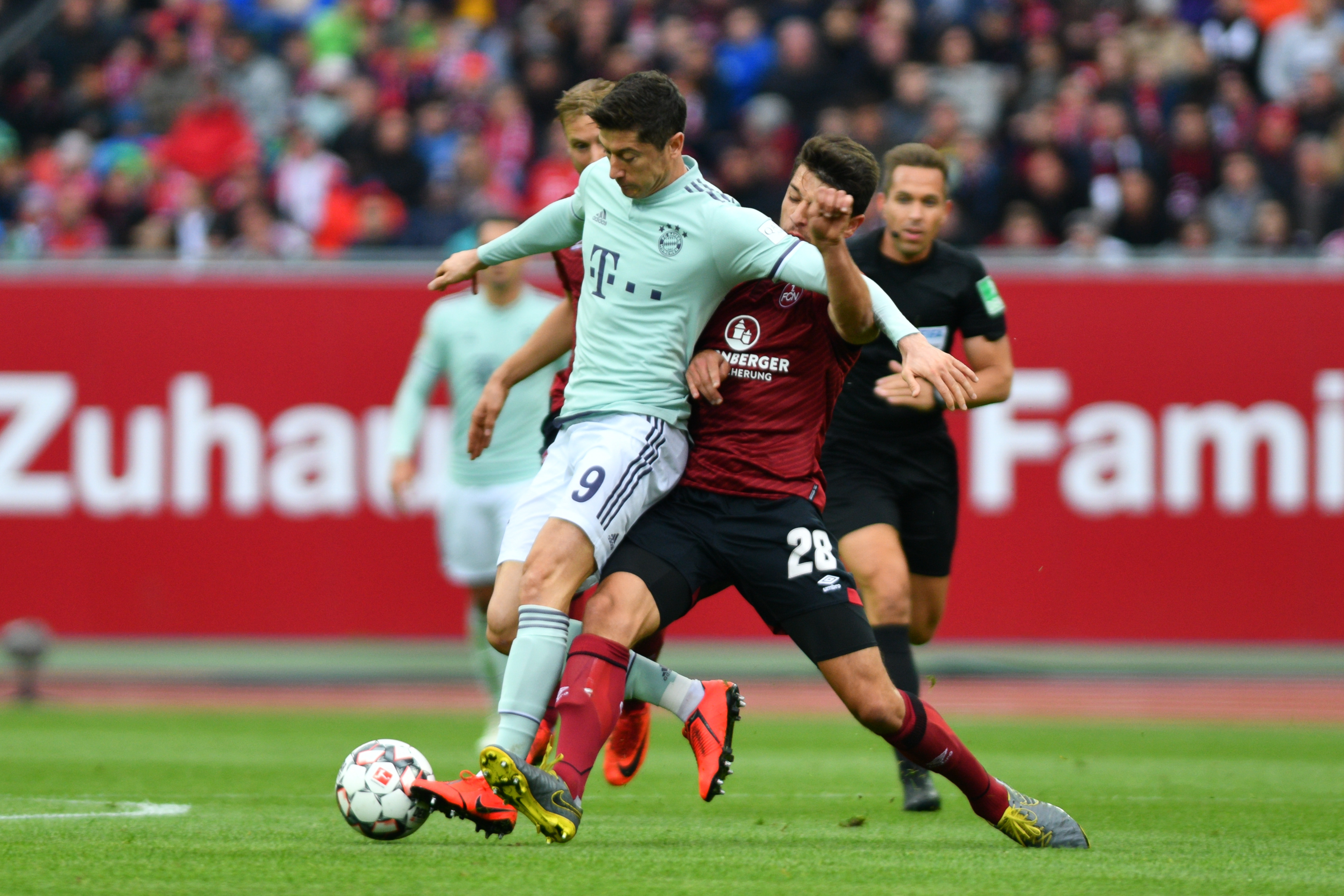
Lewandowski playing against 1. FC Nürnberg in 2019

Lewandowski was widely regarded as one of the best strikers of all-time, and is considered by many to be one of the greatest centre-forwards ever. An accurate and efficient finisher with his head and both feet, Lewandowski is a prolific goalscorer, which has led him to be dubbed Lewangoalski. A well-rounded forward, he is said to possess almost all the necessary qualities of a traditional number nine: height, strength, balance, pace, intelligent movement and proficiency with both feet. Although he primarily operates as a goal-poacher in the penalty area, due to his positional sense, ability to shoot first time, strength in the air, and powerful shot with either foot, his excellent technical skills, quick feet, proficient dribbling, vision, and physique also enable him to hold up the ball with his back to goal and either bring his teammates into play, or win fouls for his team in useful positions. Despite often functioning as a lone-centre forward or as an out-and-out striker, he has also stood out for his work-rate and defensive contribution off the ball, and is capable of dropping into deeper roles on the pitch, in order to create space for teammates with his movement, or surprise defenders by making late and sudden attacking runs into the area. He became more of a team player as his career progressed, having been criticised by pundits earlier in his career for his perceived selfishness.

Lewandowski is an accurate penalty taker and has repeatedly shown coolness and composure on the spot; he is also capable of scoring from long range, and has been known to take free kicks. In addition to his playing ability, Lewandowski has also been praised for his outstanding work-ethic, fitness, mentality, and discipline, both on the pitch and in training, by pundits, players and managers; his disciplined approach to training and fitness has led to him being nicknamed "The Body".

== Outside football ==
=== Personal life ===
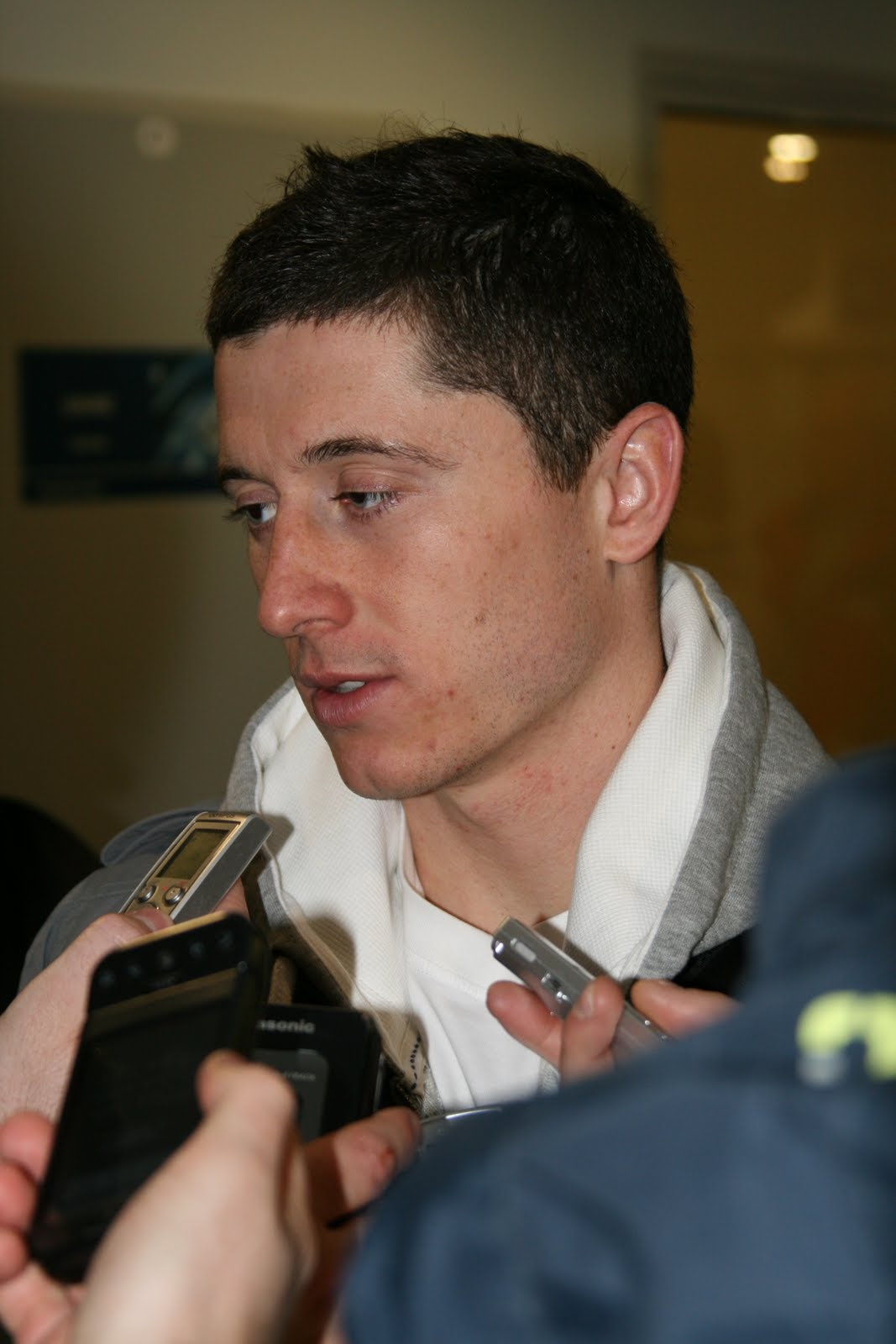
Lewandowski in 2010

Lewandowski's father gave him the name Robert to make it easier for him when moving abroad as a professional footballer. Lewandowski's father, Krzysztof (died in 2005), was a Polish judo champion, and also played football for Hutnik Warsaw in the second division. His mother, Iwona, is a former volleyball player for AZS Warsaw and later vice-president of Partyzant Leszno. His sister, Milena, also plays volleyball and has represented the U21 national team.

His wife, Anna Lewandowska (née Stachurska), won the bronze medal at the 2009 Karate World Cup. They married on 22 June 2013 in the Church of the Annunciation of the Blessed Virgin Mary in Serock. They have two children, born in 2017 and 2020.

Lewandowski is a practising Catholic. He met Pope Francis in October 2014, when Bayern Munich visited Vatican City following a 7–1 win over Roma in the UEFA Champions League.

In October 2017, the day after scoring to help Poland qualify for the 2018 World Cup, Lewandowski finished his Bachelor of Physical Education (BPhEd) with coaching and management at the Academy of Sport Education in Warsaw, concluding a decade of studies.

In addition to his native Polish, Lewandowski also speaks English and German.

Lewandowski is a fan of tennis and paddle tennis. He practiced playing tennis with Ana Ivanovic, the wife of his friend Bastian Schweinsteiger and personally knows Novak Djokovic. He attended his matches in Qatar and United Arab Emirates. In 2022, he personally congratulated Iga Świątek on winning the 2022 Roland Garros. He also plays golf and is interested in motor sports, including Formula One. In 2017 and 2022 as Aston Martin special guest, he attended the Monaco Grand Prix. In 2023, he visited the paddock of Scuderia Ferrari during the Spanish Grand Prix.

=== Philanthropy and business ===
Lewandowski and his wife, Anna, have supported, donated and raised money for various charitable organisations and for children throughout their career, including Children's Memorial Health Institute in Warsaw, for which they've raised more than PLN 150,000 during Anna's birthday party on 25 August 2018. Lewandowski also donated PLN 100,000 for the treatment of Cyprian Gaweł, a three-year-old boy from Hel; and helps raising funds for the Great Orchestra of Christmas Charity each year, donating his personal items or private meetings that are sold at online auctions.

In March 2014, he was named a UNICEF Goodwill Ambassador. In June the same year, he visited a refugee camp in Zaatari, Jordan, and took part in the "Voice of the Children" campaign in which he appealed for support of children affected by humanitarian crises.

In 2018, he and his wife donated PLN 500,000 to Children's Memorial Health Institute in Warsaw.

In March 2020, Lewandowski and his wife, Anna, donated €1 million during the COVID-19 pandemic.

In January 2022, he won a charity auction in which he paid PLN 280,000 for Dawid Tomala's Olympic gold medal. The funds were used to finance the operation of a seriously ill boy. Lewandowski subsequently returned the medal to Tomala.

In February 2022, Lewandowski condemned the Russian invasion of Ukraine and showed his solidarity with the Ukrainian people by wearing a blue and yellow armband during a Bundesliga match. The armband was later auctioned for PLN 27,000 and the money was used to purchase humanitarian aid for Ukraine.

Beside philanthropy, Lewandowski also invests primarily in startups, e-commerce, and websites, mainly through Protos Venture Capital, a company of which he is a shareholder. He also owns Stor9_, an agency specialising in marketing communications. In 2022, Lewandowski and his wife Anna's net worth was estimated at PLN 625 million (US$140 million), making them claim the 89th place on the "List of 100 Richest Poles" compiled by the Wprost magazine.

=== Sponsorship and media appearances ===
Since 2011 until 2018, he had a sponsorship contract with Gillette and appeared in numerous advertising campaigns of the brand. In 2020, the contract was renewed. In 2013, Lewandowski signed a sponsorship deal with Nike. He also collaborated and appeared in advertisements of Panasonic, T-Mobile Polska, Coca-Cola, Head & Shoulders and 4F.

In 2016, a mobile game Lewandowski: Euro Star 2016 was released on Android and iOS platforms.

In March 2022, Lewandowski cancelled his sponsorship deal with Chinese telecom company Huawei after the company's reported support to Russia following the Russian invasion of Ukraine. Lewandowski had signed on as the global ambassador for Huawei, after agreeing to a partnership in November 2015.

Lewandowski featured on the cover of the Polish edition of EA Sports' FIFA 15 video game, alongside Lionel Messi. Lewandowski's "X" goal celebration—arms crossed and index fingers pointing up—has appeared in EA Sports' FIFA series since FIFA 18.

In 2022, Lewandowski was the most popular Pole on social media. His accounts on Instagram, YouTube and TikTok were followed by over 62 million people. In 2023, he was the subject of a documentary film entitled Lewandowski − Nieznany (Lewandowski − Unknown), which premiered on 28 March and is available on Amazon Prime.

== Career statistics ==
=== Club ===
As of match played 7 November 2026

Appearances and goals by club, season and competition
Club	Season	League			National cup (Note: Includes Polish Cup, DFB-Pokal, Copa del Rey)		Continental		Other		Total	
Club	Season	Division	Apps	Goals	Apps	Goals	Apps	Goals	Apps	Goals	Apps	Goals
Delta Warsaw	2004–05	IV liga	17	4	2	0	—		—		19	4
Legia Warsaw II	2005–06	III liga	13	2	1	2	—		—		14	4
Znicz II Pruszków	2006–07	Klasa A	4	8	0	0	—		—		4	8
Znicz Pruszków	2006–07	III liga	27	15	5	2	—		—		32	17
Znicz Pruszków	2007–08	II liga	32	21	2	0	—		—		34	21
Znicz Pruszków	Total		59	36	7	2	—		—		66	38
Lech Poznań	2008–09	Ekstraklasa	30	14	6	2	12 (Note: Appearances in UEFA Cup)	4	—		48	20
Lech Poznań	2009–10	Ekstraklasa	28	18	1	0	4 (Note: Appearances in UEFA Europa League)	2	1 (Note: Appearance in Polish Super Cup)	1	34	21
Lech Poznań	Total		58	32	7	2	16	6	1	1	82	41
Borussia Dortmund	2010–11	Bundesliga	33	8	2	0	8	1	—		43	9
Borussia Dortmund	2011–12	Bundesliga	34	22	6	7	6 (Note: Appearances in UEFA Champions League)	1	1 (Note: Appearance in DFL-Supercup)	0	47	30
Borussia Dortmund	2012–13	Bundesliga	31	24	4	1	13	10	1	1	49	36
Borussia Dortmund	2013–14	Bundesliga	33	20	5	2	9	6	1	0	48	28
Borussia Dortmund	Total		131	74	17	10	36	18	3	1	187	103
Bayern Munich	2014–15	Bundesliga	31	17	5	2	12	6	1	0	49	25
Bayern Munich	2015–16	Bundesliga	32	30	6	3	12	9	1	0	51	42
Bayern Munich	2016–17	Bundesliga	33	30	4	5	9	8	1	0	47	43
Bayern Munich	2017–18	Bundesliga	30	29	6	6	11	5	1	1	48	41
Bayern Munich	2018–19	Bundesliga	33	22	5	7	8	8	1	3	47	40
Bayern Munich	2019–20	Bundesliga	31	34	5	6	10	15	1	0	47	55
Bayern Munich	2020–21	Bundesliga	29	41	1	0	6	5	4 (Note: One appearance in DFL-Supercup, two appearances and two goals in FIFA Club World Cup, one appearance in UEFA Super Cup)	2	40	48
Bayern Munich	2021–22	Bundesliga	34	35	1	0	10	13	1	2	46	50
Bayern Munich	Total		253	238	33	29	78	69	11	8	375	344
Barcelona	2022–23	La Liga	34	23	3	2	7 (Note: Five appearances and five goals in UEFA Champions League, two appearances and one goal in UEFA Europa League)	6	2 (Note: Appearance(s) in Supercopa de España)	2	46	33
Barcelona	2023–24	La Liga	35	19	3	2	9	3	2	2	49	26
Barcelona	2024–25	La Liga	34	27	3	3	13	11	2	1	52	42
Barcelona	2025–26	La Liga	31	14	3	0	11	4	1	1	46	19
Barcelona	Total		134	83	12	7	40	24	7	6	193	120
Chicago Fire	2026	MLS	19	9	—		—		4 (Note: Appearances in Leagues Cup)	1	23	10
Career total			688	486	79	52	170	117	26	17	963	672

=== International ===
As of match played 17 November 2026

Appearances and goals by national team and year
National team	Year	Apps	Goals
Poland	2008	4	2
Poland	2009	12	1
Poland	2010	13	6
Poland	2011	11	4
Poland	2012	10	2
Poland	2013	10	3
Poland	2014	6	5
Poland	2015	7	11
Poland	2016	12	8
Poland	2017	6	9
Poland	2018	11	4
Poland	2019	10	6
Poland	2020	4	2
Poland	2021	12	11
Poland	2022	10	4
Poland	2023	8	4
Poland	2024	10	2
Poland	2025	7	4
Poland	2026	9	4
Total		172	92

== Honours ==
Znicz Pruszków

- III liga (Group I): 2006–07

Lech Poznań

- Ekstraklasa: 2009–10
- Polish Cup: 2008–09
- Polish Super Cup: 2009

Borussia Dortmund

- Bundesliga: 2010–11, 2011–12
- DFB-Pokal: 2011–12
- DFL-Supercup: 2013
- UEFA Champions League runner-up: 2012–13

Bayern Munich

- Bundesliga: 2014–15, 2015–16, 2016–17, 2017–18, 2018–19, 2019–20, 2020–21, 2021–22
- DFB-Pokal: 2015–16, 2018–19, 2019–20
- DFL-Supercup: 2016, 2017, 2018, 2020, 2021
- UEFA Champions League: 2019–20
- UEFA Super Cup: 2020
- FIFA Club World Cup: 2020

Barcelona

- La Liga: 2022–23, 2024–25, 2025–26
- Copa del Rey: 2024–25
- Supercopa de España: 2023, 2025, 2026

Individual

- The Best FIFA Men's Player: 2020, 2021
- FIFA FIFPro World 11: 2020, 2021
- FIFA Club World Cup Golden Ball: 2020
- Gerd Müller Trophy (Ballon d'Or Striker of the Year): 2021, 2022
- European Golden Shoe: 2020–21, 2021–22
- IFFHS World's Best Man Player: 2020, 2021
- IFFHS World's Best Top Goal Scorer: 2020, 2021
- IFFHS World's Best International Goal Scorer: 2015, 2021
- IFFHS World's Best Top Division Goal Scorer: 2021
- IFFHS Men's World Team: 2020, 2021
- IFFHS World Team of the Decade: 2011–2020
- IFFHS UEFA Team of the Decade: 2011–2020
- UEFA Men's Player of the Year: 2019–20
- UEFA Champions League Forward of the Season: 2019–20
- UEFA Champions League top goalscorer: 2019–20
- UEFA Champions League top assist provider: 2019–20
- UEFA Champions League Squad of the Season: 2015–16, 2016–17, 2019–20, 2020–21
- UEFA Team of the Year: 2019, 2020
- UEFA European Championship qualifying Best Player: 2016
- Laureus Exceptional Achievement Award: 2022
- Golden Foot: 2022
- ESM Team of the Year: 2019–20, 2020–21, 2021–22, 2024–25
- ESPN Striker of the Year: 2020, 2021–22
- AIPS European Sportsman of the Year: 2020
- European Sportsperson of the Year: 2020
- World Soccer Player of the Year: 2020, 2021
- FourFourTwo Player of the Year: 2020, 2021
- Tuttosport Golden Player: 2020, 2021
- The Guardian Best Footballer in the World: 2020, 2021
- Goal Player of the Year: 2019–20
- Globe Soccer Best Player of the Year: 2020
- Globe Soccer Fans' Player of the Year: 2021
- Globe Soccer Maradona Award: 2021
- Ekstraklasa Player of the Season: 2009–10
- Ekstraklasa Player of the Year: 2009
- Ekstraklasa top goalscorer: 2009–10
- Ekstraklasa Goal of the Season: 2008–09
- II liga top goalscorer: 2007–08
- III liga (Group I) top goalscorer: 2006–07
- Polish Footballer of the Year: 2011, 2012, 2013, 2014, 2015, 2016, 2017, 2019, 2020, 2021, 2022, 2024, 2025
- Polish Sports Personality of the Year: 2015, 2020, 2021
- Polish Young Player of the Year: 2008
- Polish Football Association National Team of the Century: 1919–2019
- Bundesliga Player of the Season: 2016–17, 2019–20
- Bundesliga Team of the Season: 2012–13, 2013–14, 2014–15, 2015–16, 2016–17, 2017–18, 2018–19, 2020–21, 2021–22
- Bundesliga Fantasy Team of the Season: 2019–20, 2020–21, 2021–22
- Bundesliga Player of the Month: August 2019, October 2020
- Bundesliga Goal of the Month: March 2019, August 2019, May 2021
- VDV Player of the Season (Silver Boot): 2012–13, 2016–17, 2017–18, 2019–20, 2020–21
- VDV Team of the Season: 2012–13, 2013–14, 2014–15, 2015–16, 2016–17, 2017–18, 2018–19, 2019–20, 2020–21, 2021–22
- German Sports Journalists' Footballer of the Year: 2020, 2021
- kicker Torjägerkanone (Bundesliga top goalscorer): 2013–14, 2015–16, 2017–18, 2018–19, 2019–20, 2020–21, 2021–22
- kicker Team of the Season: 2013–14, 2015–16, 2017–18, 2018–19, 2019–20, 2020–21, 2021–22
- DFB-Pokal top goalscorer: 2011–12, 2016–17, 2017–18, 2018–19, 2019–20
- Pichichi Trophy: 2022–23
- La Liga Team of the Season: 2022–23, 2023–24, 2024–25
- La Liga Player of the Month: October 2022, February 2024, October 2024
- Lech Poznań All-time XI: 2022
- Znicz Pruszków Best Player of All Time: 2023
- Bayern Munich Player of the Season: 2015–16, 2019–20, 2020–21

Orders

- Order of Polonia Restituta, Commander's Cross: 2021
- Bene Merito honorary distinction: 2025
- Order of the Smile: 2022

Records

- Fastest hat-trick in a Bundesliga match: 202 seconds
- Fastest four goals in a Bundesliga match: 342 seconds
- Fastest five goals in a Bundesliga match: 539 seconds
- Most goals scored by a substitute in a Bundesliga match: 5 goals

== See also ==
- List of footballers with 100 or more UEFA Champions League appearances
- List of top international men's football goalscorers by country
- List of men's footballers with 100 or more international caps
- List of men's footballers with 50 or more international goals
- List of men's footballers with the most official appearances
- List of men's footballers with 500 or more goals
- List of UEFA Champions League top scorers
- Bundesliga records and statistics
- List of Bundesliga top scorers
- List of foreign La Liga players
- List of foreign MLS players
- List of Polish people
