= Circular fashion =

Application of circular economy to the fashion industry

Circular fashion is an application of circular economy to the fashion industry, where the life cycles of fashion products are extended. The aim is to create a closed-loop system where clothing items are designed, produced, used, and then recycled or repurposed in a way that minimizes waste and reduces the environmental impact of the fashion industry. It involves moving away from the traditional linear model of take-make-use-and-dispose towards a circular model of reduce-reuse-recycle-and-regenerate. This model not only helps in reducing environmental impact but also promotes economic growth through innovative business models and sustainable practices.

According to the definition of The European Parliament, this involves "sharing, leasing, reusing, repairing, refurbishing and recycling existing materials and products as long as possible." As suggested by The European Commission report, circular fashion encompasses a range of practices and strategies such as designing clothes for longevity, using sustainable materials, implementing recycling programs, and promoting secondhand markets. It also involves reducing the environmental impact of the production process by using sustainable energy sources and reducing the use of chemicals and water. Garments used in circular fashion are designed for longevity and durability with eco-friendly materials to encourage longer lifespans and methods that minimize waste and environmental impact.

Pioneering work and terminology on circular fashion reached the mainstream through a 2017 report by the Ellen MacArthur Foundation titled "A New Textiles Economy: Redesigning Fashion's Future". So far, the EU has been the main proponent for developing frameworks around circular fashion on a policy level, such as the Circular Economy Action Plan, part of the European Commission's "EU strategy for sustainable and circular textiles," launched in March 2022.
