= Anna Lewandowska =

Polish karateka (born 1988)

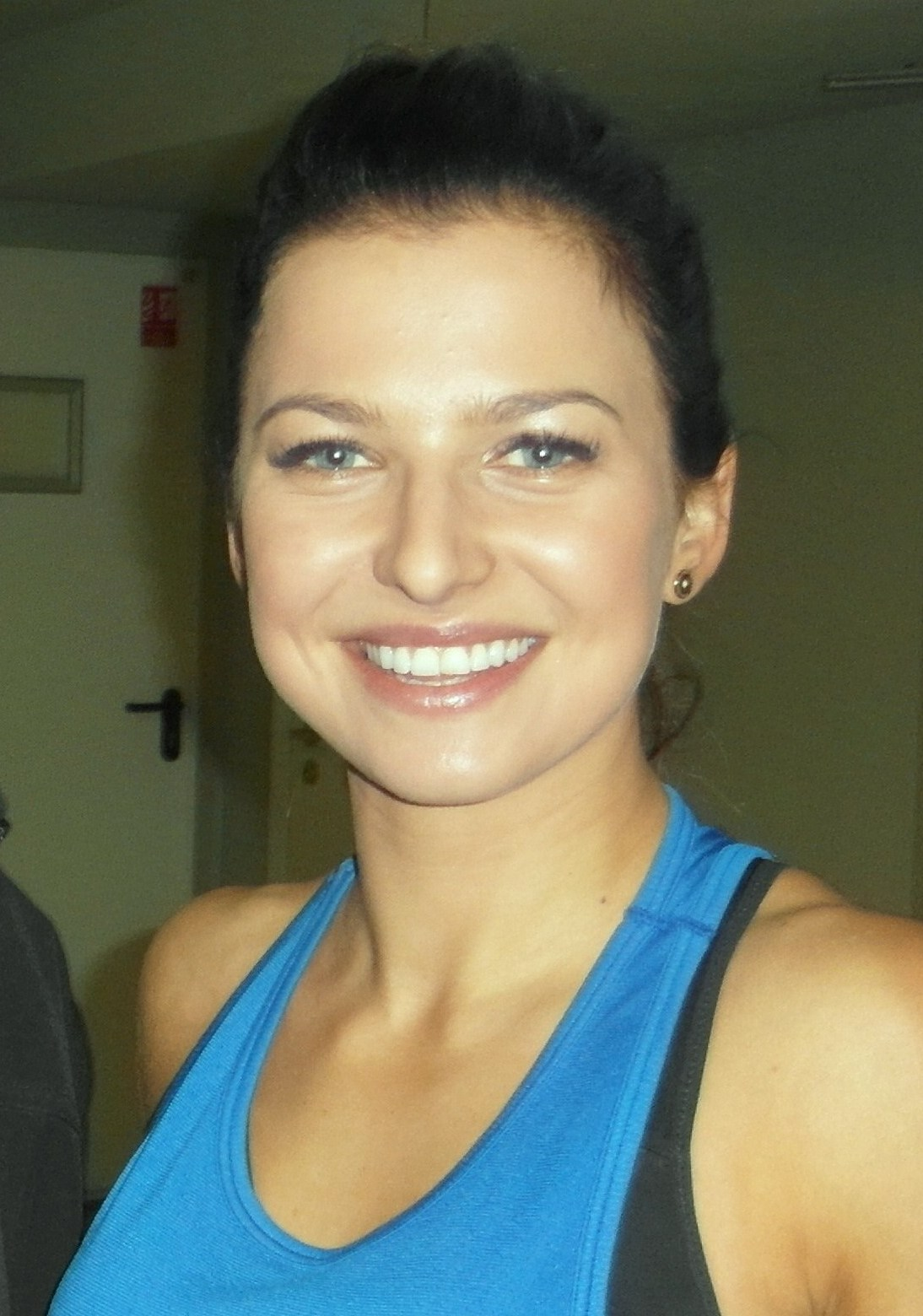
- Lewandowska in 2011

Personal information
- National team: Poland
- Born: 7 September 1988 (age 37) Łódź, Poland
- Education: Academy of Physical Education in Warsaw
- Occupation: Karateka
- Spouse: Robert Lewandowski (m. 2013)
- Children: 2

Sport
- Country: Poland
- Sport: Karate
- Updated on 27 July 2016

Anna Lewandowska (née Stachurska; 7 September 1988) is a Polish karateka, personal trainer, and entrepreneur. She is a multiple medalist in the World, European, and national Championships. Lewandowska is married to footballer Robert Lewandowski.

== Early life and education ==
Lewandowska was born on 7 September 1988 in Łódź to Bogdan Stachurski and his wife Maria. She is a graduate of the Academy of Physical Education in Warsaw, defending her thesis in 2012.

== Career ==
Lewandowska is a member of Pruszkow Karate Club. During her career, she won three medals in the world championships seniors, six European Championships medals in different age categories (including two European Championships seniors), and 29 Polish Championship medals. In September 2013, Lewandowska became a nutritionist. She started the blog Healthy Plan by Ann, which provides nutritional advice and workout plans. In 2014, Lewandowska published her first book titled Żyj zdrowo i aktywnie z Anną Lewandowską (lit. 'Lead a Healthy and Active Life with Anna Lewandowska'), in which she encourages readers to change their eating habits and offers recipes for a number of dishes as well as exercises prepared by herself.

In 2016, Lewandowska was appointed director of the Polish Special Olympiads, an organization which provides support for the mentally disabled through sport as well as raises social awareness about the challenges faced by this group of people. The same year, she launched the Foods by Ann brand which sells healthy snacks and dietary supplements. In 2019, Lewandowska became a host of the TV show Sztuki walki (lit. 'Martial Arts') aired on the morning television program Dzień Dobry TVN. The same year, she launched her cosmetics brand, Phlov. In 2024, with her husband's move to FC Barcelona, Lewandowska opened a fitness studio in Barcelona named Edan Studios.

== Personal life ==
On 22 June 2013, Lewandowska married Polish footballer Robert Lewandowski in Serock. They have two daughters together.
