= 2018–19 FC Schalke 04 season =

Schalke 04
2018–19 season
- President: Clemens Tönnies
- Manager: Domenico Tedesco (until 14 March); Huub Stevens (interim, from 14 March)
- Stadium: Veltins-Arena
- Bundesliga: 14th
- DFB-Pokal: Quarter-finals
- UEFA Champions League: Round of 16
- Top goalscorer: League: Daniel Caligiuri (7 goals); All: Nabil Bentaleb (8 goals)
- Highest home attendance: 62,271
- Lowest home attendance: 45,755
- Average home league attendance: 60,941
- Biggest win: Schalke 5–2 Nürnberg; Schalke 4–1 Düsseldorf
- Biggest defeat: Manchester City 7–0 Schalke
Home colours	Away colours	Third colours

The 2018–19 FC Schalke 04 season was the 115th season in the football club's history and 28th consecutive and 51st overall season in the top flight of German football, the Bundesliga, having been promoted from the 2. Bundesliga in 1991. In addition to the domestic league, Schalke 04 also were participating in this season's editions of the domestic cup, the DFB-Pokal, and the first-tier continental cup, the UEFA Champions League. This was the 18th season for Schalke in the Veltins-Arena, located in Gelsenkirchen, North Rhine-Westphalia. The season covered a period from 1 July 2018 to 30 June 2019.

== Players ==
=== Squad information ===
As of 18 May 2019

Note: Flags indicate national team as defined under FIFA eligibility rules; some limited exceptions apply. Players may hold more than one non-FIFA nationality.

No.	Pos.	Nation	Player
1	GK	GER	Ralf Fährmann (captain)
2	MF	USA	Weston McKennie
3	DF	MAR	Hamza Mendyl
5	DF	SRB	Matija Nastasić
6	MF	ESP	Omar Mascarell
7	FW	GER	Mark Uth
8	MF	GER	Suat Serdar
10	MF	ALG	Nabil Bentaleb
11	MF	UKR	Yevhen Konoplyanka
13	MF	GER	Sebastian Rudy
14	FW	WAL	Rabbi Matondo
15	FW	TUR	Ahmed Kutucu
17	DF	FRA	Benjamin Stambouli
18	MF	GER	Daniel Caligiuri
19	FW	AUT	Guido Burgstaller

No.	Pos.	Nation	Player
21	DF	GER	Sascha Riether
22	FW	GER	Steven Skrzybski
23	FW	GER	Cedric Teuchert
24	DF	GER	Bastian Oczipka
25	MF	MAR	Amine Harit
26	DF	SEN	Salif Sané
27	DF	NED	Jeffrey Bruma (on loan from VfL Wolfsburg)
28	MF	AUT	Alessandro Schöpf
34	GK	AUT	Michael Langer
35	GK	GER	Alexander Nübel
36	FW	SUI	Breel Embolo
41	MF	MAR	Nassim Boujellab
42	DF	GER	Jonas Carls
44	DF	AUS	George Timotheou

=== Transfers ===
==== In ====
No.	Pos	Player	From	Type	Window	Ends	Fee in €	Source
41	MF	(Morocco) Nassim Boujellab	(Germany) Schalke 04 II	Promoted	Season (Matchday 28)	2022	—	
14	FW	(Wales) Rabbi Matondo	(England) Manchester City	Transfer	Winter	2023	9,000,000	
27	DF	(Netherlands) Jeffrey Bruma	(Germany) VfL Wolfsburg	Loan	Winter	2019	Free	
15	FW	(Turkey) Ahmed Kutucu	(Germany) Schalke 04 U19	Promoted	Winter	2022	—	
13	MF	(Germany) Sebastian Rudy	(Germany) Bayern Munich	Transfer	Summer	2022	16,000,000	
8	MF	(Germany) Suat Serdar	(Germany) Mainz 05	Transfer	Summer	2022	10,500,000	
6	MF	(Spain) Omar Mascarell	(Spain) Real Madrid	Transfer	Summer	2022	10,000,000	
26	DF	(Senegal) Salif Sané	(Germany) Hannover 96	Transfer	Summer	2022	7,000,000	
3	DF	(Morocco) Hamza Mendyl	(France) Lille OSC	Transfer	Summer	2023	6,000,000	
22	FW	(Germany) Steven Skrzybski	(Germany) Union Berlin	Transfer	Summer	2021	3,200,000	
7	FW	(Germany) Mark Uth	(Germany) 1899 Hoffenheim	Transfer	Summer	2022	Free	
4	DF	(Germany) Benedikt Höwedes	(Italy) Juventus	End of loan	Summer	2020	—	—
16	MF	(Germany) Johannes Geis	(Spain) Sevilla	End of loan	Summer	2019	—	—
23	DF	(Spain) Coke	(Spain) Levante	End of loan	Summer	2019	—	—
33	FW	(Kosovo) Donis Avdijaj	(Netherlands) Roda JC Kerkrade	End of loan	Summer	2019	—	—
30	FW	(United States) Haji Wright	(Germany) SV Sandhausen	End of loan	Summer	2020	—	—
21	DF	(Germany) Luke Hemmerich	(Germany) VfL Bochum	End of loan	Summer	2020	—	—
16	FW	(Germany) Fabian Reese	(Germany) Greuther Fürth	End of loan	Summer	2020	—	—

==== Out ====
No.	Pos	Player	To	Type	Window	Fee in €	Source
29	DF	(Brazil) Naldo	(France) AS Monaco	Transfer	Winter	2,000,000	
9	FW	(Argentina) Franco Di Santo	(Spain) Rayo Vallecano	Transfer	Winter	Free	
16	MF	(Germany) Johannes Geis	(Germany) 1. FC Köln	Transfer	Winter	Free	
14	DF	(Ghana) Abdul Rahman Baba	(England) Chelsea	End of loan	Winter	—	
20	DF	(Germany) Thilo Kehrer	(France) Paris Saint-Germain	Transfer	Summer	37,000,000	
4	DF	(Germany) Benedikt Höwedes	(Russia) Lokomotiv Moscow	Transfer	Summer	5,000,000	
23	DF	(Spain) Coke	(Spain) Levante	Transfer	Summer	1,500,000	
32	MF	(Ghana) Bernard Tekpetey	(Germany) SC Paderborn	Transfer	Summer	150,000	
8	MF	(Germany) Leon Goretzka	(Germany) Bayern Munich	Transfer	Summer	Free	
7	MF	(Germany) Max Meyer	(England) Crystal Palace	Transfer	Summer	Free	
33	FW	(Kosovo) Donis Avdijaj	(Netherlands) Willem II	Transfer	Summer	Free	
21	DF	(Germany) Luke Hemmerich	(Germany) Erzgebirge Aue	Transfer	Summer	Free	
—	DF	(Germany) Joshua Bitter	(Germany) Werder Bremen II	Transfer	Summer	Free	
—	FW	(Germany) Felix Schröter	(Germany) FV Illertissen	Transfer	Summer	Free	
3	DF	(Spain) Pablo Insua	(Spain) Huesca	Loan	Summer	Free	
16	FW	(Germany) Fabian Reese	(Germany) Greuther Fürth	Loan	Summer	Free	
22	FW	(Croatia) Marko Pjaca	(Italy) Juventus	End of loan	Summer	—	—

== Club ==
=== Kit ===
Supplier: Umbro / Sponsor: Gazprom

Home	Home alt	Away	Away alt.	Third	Third Alt.	Fourth

== Friendly matches ==
Win Draw Loss

5 July 2018 Friendly	Southampton F.C.	3–3	Schalke 04	Kunshan, China
20:05 CST (UTC+8)	Redmond 45+1'; Reed 48'; Hesketh 68'	Report	Konoplyanka 21'; Serdar 54'; Skrzybski 84'	Stadium: Kunshan Sports Centre Stadium; Attendance: 14,000; Referee: Ma Ning, (China)

11 July 2018 Friendly	Hebei China Fortune F.C.	1–3	Schalke 04	Langfang, China
19:30 CST (UTC+8)	Dong 66'	Report	Teuchert 86'; Uth 87'; Jin 90+1' (o.g.)	Stadium: Langfang Stadium; Attendance: 2,000; Referee: Fu Ming, (China)

21 July 2018 Friendly	Schwarz-Weiß Essen	0–1	Schalke 04	Essen, Germany
17:00 CEST (UTC+2)		Report	Teuchert 6'	Stadium: Uhlenkrugstadion; Attendance: 4,000; Referee: Lukas Luthe, (Germany)

29 July 2018 Friendly	Erzgebirge Aue	1–0	Schalke 04	Aue, Germany
15:00 CEST (UTC+2)	Herrmann 76' (pen.)	Report		Stadium: Erzgebirgsstadion; Attendance: 15,250; Referee: Felix-Benjamin Schwermer, (Germany)

5 August 2018 Friendly	Angers	0–1	Schalke 04	Mittersill, Austria
15:30 CEST (UTC+2)		Report	Burgstaller 15'	Stadium: Waldstadion; Attendance: 2,000; Referee: Bernd Hirschbichler, (Austria)

11 August 2018 Friendly	Schalke 04	3–0	Fiorentina	Gelsenkirchen, Germany
16:00 CEST (UTC+2)	McKennie 69'; Skrzybski 75'; Teuchert 84'	Report		Stadium: Veltins-Arena; Attendance: 17,131; Referee: Markus Wollenweber, (Germany)

18 November 2018 Friendly	Zenit	2–1	Schalke 04	Saint Petersburg, Russia
15:00 MSK (UTC+2)	Kranevitter 6'; Ozdoyev 78' (pen.)	Report	Skrzybski 35'	Stadium: Krestovsky Stadium; Attendance: 41,214; Referee: Sergey Lapochkin, (Russia)

11 January 2019 Friendly	KRC Genk	2–2	Schalke 04	Benidorm, Spain
15:30 CET (UTC+1)	Dewaest 17'; Trossard 30'	Report	Uth 19'; Schöpf 57'	Stadium: Estadio Municipal Guillermo Amor; Attendance: 700; Referee: Campo Hernandez, (Spain)

22 March 2019 A. Puerta Trophy	Sevilla	2–0	Schalke 04	Seville, Spain
20:45 CET (UTC+1)	Mesa 35'; Munir 72' (pen.)	Report		Stadium: Ramón Sánchez Pizjuán; Attendance: 25,000; Referee: Mario Melero López, (Spain)

== Competitions ==
Win Draw Loss

=== Overview ===
Competition	First match	Last match	Starting round	Final position	Record							
Competition	First match	Last match	Starting round	Final position	Pld	W	D	L	GF	GA	GD	Win %
Bundesliga	25 August 2018	18 May 2019	Matchday 1	14th	34	8	9	17	37	55	−18	23.53
DFB-Pokal	17 August 2018	3 April 2019	First round	Quarter-finals	4	2	1	1	7	4	+3	50.00
Champions League	18 September 2018	12 March 2019	Group stage	Round of 16	8	3	2	3	8	14	−6	37.50
Total					46	13	12	21	52	73	−21	28.26

Last updated: 25 May 2019
Source: Competitions

=== Bundesliga ===
==== League table ====
Pos	Team	Pld	W	D	L	GF	GA	GD	Pts	Qualification or relegation
12	Mainz 05	34	12	7	15	46	57	−11	43	
13	SC Freiburg	34	8	12	14	46	61	−15	36	
14	Schalke 04	34	8	9	17	37	55	−18	33	
15	FC Augsburg	34	8	8	18	51	71	−20	32	
16	VfB Stuttgart (R)	34	7	7	20	32	70	−38	28	Qualification for the relegation play-offs

Source: DFB
Rules for classification: 1) Points; 2) Goal difference; 3) Goals scored; 4) Head-to-head results; 5) Head-to-head away goals scored; 6) Away goals scored; 7) Play-off
(R) Relegated

==== Results summary ====
Overall								Home						Away					
Pld	W	D	L	GF	GA	GD	Pts	W	D	L	GF	GA	GD	W	D	L	GF	GA	GD
34	8	9	17	37	55	−18	33	4	3	10	16	28	−12	4	6	7	21	27	−6

Last updated: 25 May 2019.
Source: Bundesliga

Round	1	2	3	4	5	6	7	8	9	10	11	12	13	14	15	16	17	18	19	20	21	22	23	24	25	26	27	28	29	30	31	32	33	34
Ground	A	H	A	H	A	H	A	H	A	H	A	H	A	H	A	H	A	H	A	H	A	H	A	H	A	H	A	H	A	H	A	H	A	H
Result	L	L	L	L	L	W	W	L	D	W	L	W	D	L	D	L	W	W	D	L	L	D	L	L	L	L	W	L	D	L	W	D	D	D
Position	11	15	17	18	18	17	15	16	15	14	14	14	12	13	13	14	13	12	12	12	14	14	14	14	14	15	14	14	15	15	15	15	15	14

Updated to match(es) played on 25 May 2019. Source: DFB
A = Away; H = Home; W = Win; D = Draw; L = Loss

==== Matches ====
25 August 2018 1	VfL Wolfsburg	2–1	Schalke 04	Wolfsburg
15:30 CEST (UTC+2)	Brooks 33'; Ginczek 90+4'	Report	Bentaleb 85' (pen.)	Stadium: Volkswagen Arena; Attendance: 26,621; Referee: Patrick Ittrich

2 September 2018 2	Schalke 04	0–2	Hertha BSC	Gelsenkirchen
18:00 CEST (UTC+2)		Report	Duda 15', 90+6'	Stadium: Veltins-Arena; Attendance: 60,181; Referee: Sascha Stegemann

15 September 2018 3	Borussia Mönchengladbach	2–1	Schalke 04	Mönchengladbach
18:30 CEST (UTC+2)	Ginter 3'; Herrmann 76'	Report	Embolo 90+3'	Stadium: Borussia-Park; Attendance: 54,022; Referee: Manuel Gräfe

22 September 2018 4	Schalke 04	0–2	Bayern Munich	Gelsenkirchen
18:30 CEST (UTC+2)		Report	Rodríguez 8'; Lewandowski 64' (pen.)	Stadium: Veltins-Arena; Attendance: 62,271; Referee: Daniel Siebert

25 September 2018 5	SC Freiburg	1–0	Schalke 04	Freiburg
20:30 CEST (UTC+2)	Niederlechner 52'	Report		Stadium: Schwarzwald-Stadion; Attendance: 24,000; Referee: Frank Willenborg

29 September 2018 6	Schalke 04	1–0	Mainz 05	Gelsenkirchen
15:30 CEST (UTC+2)	Schöpf 11'	Report		Stadium: Veltins-Arena; Attendance: 61,810; Referee: Benjamin Cortus

6 October 2018 7	Fortuna Düsseldorf	0–2	Schalke 04	Düsseldorf
15:30 CEST (UTC+2)		Report	McKennie 47'; Burgstaller 53'	Stadium: Merkur Spiel-Arena; Attendance: 52,000; Referee: Sven Jablonski

20 October 2018 8	Schalke 04	0–2	Werder Bremen	Gelsenkirchen
18:30 CEST (UTC+2)		Report	M. Eggestein 43', 66'	Stadium: Veltins-Arena; Attendance: 62,271; Referee: Christian Dingert

28 October 2018 9	RB Leipzig	0–0	Schalke 04	Leipzig
15:30 CET (UTC+1)		Report		Stadium: Red Bull Arena; Attendance: 41,939; Referee: Felix Brych

3 November 2018 10	Schalke 04	3–1	Hannover 96	Gelsenkirchen
15:30 CET (UTC+1)	Bentaleb 57' (pen.); Embolo 71'; Uth 85'	Report	Weydandt 70'	Stadium: Veltins-Arena; Attendance: 61,959; Referee: Markus Schmidt

11 November 2018 11	Eintracht Frankfurt	3–0	Schalke 04	Frankfurt
18:00 CET (UTC+1)	Jović 61', 73'; Haller 80'	Report		Stadium: Commerzbank-Arena; Attendance: 50,700; Referee: Benjamin Cortus

24 November 2018 12	Schalke 04	5–2	1. FC Nürnberg	Gelsenkirchen
18:30 CET (UTC+1)	Skrzybski 26', 84'; Harit 32'; Burgstaller 70'; Oczipka 90+3'	Report	Palacios Martínez 38'; Zreľák 78'	Stadium: Veltins-Arena; Attendance: 62,271; Referee: Guido Winkmann

1 December 2018 13	1899 Hoffenheim	1–1	Schalke 04	Sinsheim
18:30 CET (UTC+1)	Kramarić 59' (pen.)	Report	Bentaleb 73' (pen.)	Stadium: Wirsol Rhein-Neckar-Arena; Attendance: 30,000; Referee: Robert Kampka

8 December 2018 14	Schalke 04	1–2	Borussia Dortmund	Gelsenkirchen
15:30 CET (UTC+1)	Caligiuri 61' (pen.)	Report	Delaney 7'; Sancho 74'	Stadium: Veltins-Arena; Attendance: 61,767; Referee: Daniel Siebert

15 December 2018 15	FC Augsburg	1–1	Schalke 04	Augsburg
15:30 CET (UTC+1)	Gregoritsch 13'	Report	Caligiuri 52'	Stadium: WWK Arena; Attendance: 27,233; Referee: Manuel Gräfe

19 December 2018 16	Schalke 04	1–2	Bayer Leverkusen	Gelsenkirchen
18:30 CET (UTC+1)	Wright 45+2'	Report	Dragović 26'; Alario 35'	Stadium: Veltins-Arena; Attendance: 61,548; Referee: Deniz Aytekin

22 December 2018 17	VfB Stuttgart	1–3	Schalke 04	Stuttgart
15:30 CET (UTC+1)	González 76'	Report	Skrzybski 10'; Sané 70'; Kutucu 78'	Stadium: Mercedes-Benz Arena; Attendance: 54,022; Referee: Felix Brych

20 January 2019 18	Schalke 04	2–1	VfL Wolfsburg	Gelsenkirchen
18:00 CET (UTC+1)	Caligiuri 8' (pen.), 78'	Report	Rexhbeçaj 20'	Stadium: Veltins-Arena; Attendance: 58,827; Referee: Manuel Gräfe

25 January 2019 19	Hertha BSC	2–2	Schalke 04	Berlin
20:30 CET (UTC+1)	Grujić 39'; Ibišević 45+4'	Report	Konoplyanka 17'; Uth 44'	Stadium: Olympiastadion Berlin; Attendance: 43,027; Referee: Felix Brych

2 February 2019 20	Schalke 04	0–2	Borussia Mönchengladbach	Gelsenkirchen
18:30 CET (UTC+1)		Report	Kramer 85'; Neuhaus 90+1'	Stadium: Veltins-Arena; Attendance: 62,271; Referee: Marco Fritz

9 February 2019 21	Bayern Munich	3–1	Schalke 04	Munich
18:30 CET (UTC+1)	Bruma 11' (o.g.); Lewandowski 27'; Gnabry 57'	Report	Kutucu 25'	Stadium: Allianz Arena; Attendance: 75,000; Referee: Daniel Siebert

16 February 2019 22	Schalke 04	0–0	SC Freiburg	Gelsenkirchen
15:30 CET (UTC+1)		Report		Stadium: Veltins-Arena; Attendance: 58,271; Referee: Frank Willenborg

23 February 2019 23	Mainz 05	3–0	Schalke 04	Mainz
15:30 CET (UTC+1)	Onisiwo 18', 84'; Mateta 73'	Report		Stadium: Opel Arena; Attendance: 26,005; Referee: Sven Jablonski

2 March 2019 24	Schalke 04	0–4	Fortuna Düsseldorf	Gelsenkirchen
15:30 CET (UTC+1)		Report	Lukebakio 35' (pen.); Kownacki 62', 84'; Raman 68'	Stadium: Veltins-Arena; Attendance: 60,322; Referee: Felix Brych

8 March 2019 25	Werder Bremen	4–2	Schalke 04	Bremen
20:30 CET (UTC+1)	Rashica 31', 73'; Kruse 51' (pen.); Harnik 90+4'	Report	Embolo 26', 85'	Stadium: Weser-Stadion; Attendance: 42,100; Referee: Martin Petersen

16 March 2019 26	Schalke 04	0–1	RB Leipzig	Gelsenkirchen
15:30 CET (UTC+1)		Report	Werner 14'	Stadium: Veltins-Arena; Attendance: 59,913; Referee: Guido Winkmann

31 March 2019 27	Hannover 96	0–1	Schalke 04	Hanover
15:30 CEST (UTC+2)		Report	Serdar 39'	Stadium: HDI-Arena; Attendance: 44,500; Referee: Sven Jablonski

6 April 2019 28	Schalke 04	1–2	Eintracht Frankfurt	Gelsenkirchen
15:30 CEST (UTC+2)	Serdar 21'	Report	Rebić 13'; Jović 90+9' (pen.)	Stadium: Veltins-Arena; Attendance: 61,842; Referee: Sascha Stegemann

12 April 2019 29	1. FC Nürnberg	1–1	Schalke 04	Nuremberg
20:30 CEST (UTC+2)	Kubo 82'	Report	Nastasić 85'	Stadium: Max-Morlock-Stadion; Attendance: 50,000; Referee: Robert Kampka

20 April 2019 30	Schalke 04	2–5	1899 Hoffenheim	Gelsenkirchen
20:30 CEST (UTC+2)	Caligiuri 60' (pen.); Burgstaller 90'	Report	Belfodil 25', 80'; Kramarić 45'; Szalai 65'; Amiri 73'	Stadium: Veltins-Arena; Attendance: 58,958; Referee: Christian Dingert

27 April 2019 31	Borussia Dortmund	2–4	Schalke 04	Dortmund
15:30 CEST (UTC+2)	Götze 14'; Witsel 85'	Report	Caligiuri 18' (pen.), 62'; Sané 28'; Embolo 86'	Stadium: Signal Iduna Park; Attendance: 80,196; Referee: Felix Zwayer

5 May 2019 32	Schalke 04	0–0	FC Augsburg	Gelsenkirchen
13:30 CEST (UTC+2)		Report		Stadium: Veltins-Arena; Attendance: 59,841; Referee: Manuel Gräfe

11 May 2019 33	Bayer Leverkusen	1–1	Schalke 04	Leverkusen
15:30 CEST (UTC+2)	Havertz 31'	Report	Burgstaller 47'	Stadium: BayArena; Attendance: 30,210; Referee: Deniz Aytekin

18 May 2019 34	Schalke 04	0–0	VfB Stuttgart	Gelsenkirchen
15:30 CEST (UTC+2)		Report		Stadium: Veltins-Arena; Attendance: 61,676; Referee: Bibiana Steinhaus

=== DFB-Pokal ===
17 August 2018 First round	1. FC Schweinfurt	0–2	Schalke 04	Schweinfurt
20:45 CEST (UTC+2)		Report	Bentaleb 24' (pen.); Jabiri 75' (o.g.)	Stadium: Willy-Sachs-Stadion; Attendance: 15,060; Referee: Arne Aarnink

31 October 2018 Second round	1. FC Köln	1–1 (a.e.t.) (5–6 p)	Schalke 04	Cologne
18:30 CET (UTC+1)	Córdoba 43'	Report	Bentaleb 88' (pen.)	Stadium: RheinEnergieStadion; Attendance: 50,000; Referee: Harm Osmers
	Penalties
	Höger (penalty missed); Özcan (penalty scored); Terodde (penalty scored); Guirassy (penalty scored); Risse (penalty scored); Hector (penalty scored); Drexler (penalty missed)		(penalty scored) Burgstaller; (penalty scored) Nastasić; (penalty scored) Caligiuri; (penalty scored) Harit; (penalty missed) Bentaleb; (penalty scored) Rudy; (penalty scored) Uth

6 February 2019 Round of 16	Schalke 04	4–1	Fortuna Düsseldorf	Gelsenkirchen
20:45 CET (UTC+1)	Kutucu 30'; Sané 48', 87'; Uth 53'	Report	Hennings 71'	Stadium: Veltins-Arena; Attendance: 56,638; Referee: Manuel Gräfe

3 April 2019 Quarter-finals	Schalke 04	0–2	Werder Bremen	Gelsenkirchen
20:45 CEST (UTC+2)		Report	Rashica 65'; Klaassen 72'	Stadium: Veltins-Arena; Attendance: 61,597; Referee: Deniz Aytekin

=== UEFA Champions League ===
==== Group stage ====
Pos	Team	Pld	W	D	L	GF	GA	GD	Pts	Qualification
1	(Portugal) Porto	6	5	1	0	15	6	+9	16	Advance to knockout phase
2	(Germany) Schalke 04	6	3	2	1	6	4	+2	11	Advance to knockout phase
3	(Turkey) Galatasaray	6	1	1	4	5	8	−3	4	Transfer to Europa League
4	(Russia) Lokomotiv Moscow	6	1	0	5	4	12	−8	3	

Source: UEFA
Rules for classification: Group stage tiebreakers

18 September 2018 1	Schalke 04 (Germany)	1–1	(Portugal) Porto	Gelsenkirchen, Germany
21:00 CEST (UTC+2)	Embolo 64'	Report	Otávio 75' (pen.)	Stadium: Veltins-Arena; Attendance: 45,755; Referee: Jesús Gil Manzano (Spain)

3 October 2018 2	Lokomotiv Moscow (Russia)	0–1	(Germany) Schalke 04	Moscow, Russia
19:55 MSK (UTC+3); 18:55 CEST (UTC+2)		Report	McKennie 88'	Stadium: RZD Arena; Attendance: 21,471; Referee: Anthony Taylor (England)

24 October 2018 3	Galatasaray (Turkey)	0–0	(Germany) Schalke 04	Istanbul, Germany
22:00 TRT (UTC+3); 21:00 CEST (UTC+2)		Report		Stadium: Türk Telekom Stadium; Attendance: 46,667; Referee: Benoît Bastien (France)

6 November 2018 4	Schalke 04 (Germany)	2–0	(Turkey) Galatasaray	Gelsenkirchen, Germany
21:00 CET (UTC+1)	Burgstaller 4'; Uth 57'	Report		Stadium: Veltins-Arena; Attendance: 54,740; Referee: Willie Collum (Scotland)

28 November 2018 5	Porto (Portugal)	3–1	(Germany) Schalke 04	Porto, Portugal
20:00 WET (UTC±0); 21:00 CET (UTC+1)	Militão 52'; Corona 55'; Marega 90+4'	Report	Bentaleb 89' (pen.)	Stadium: Estádio do Dragão; Attendance: 41,603; Referee: Ovidiu Hațegan (Romania)

11 December 2018 6	Schalke 04 (Germany)	1–0	(Russia) Lokomotiv Moscow	Gelsenkirchen, Germany
18:55 CET (UTC+1)	Schöpf 90+1'	Report		Stadium: Veltins-Arena; Attendance: 48,883; Referee: Anastasios Sidiropoulos (Greece)

==== Knockout phase ====
===== Round of 16 =====
20 February 2019 First leg	Schalke 04 (Germany)	2–3	(England) Manchester City	Gelsenkirchen, Germany
21:00 CET (UTC+1)	Bentaleb 38' (pen.), 45' (pen.)	Report	Agüero 18'; Sané 85'; Sterling 90'	Stadium: Veltins-Arena; Attendance: 54,417; Referee: Carlos del Cerro Grande (Spain)

12 March 2019 Second leg	Manchester City (England)	7–0 (10–2 agg.)	(Germany) Schalke 04	Manchester, England
20:00 GMT (UTC±0); 21:00 CET (UTC+1)	Agüero 35' (pen.), 38'; Sané 43'; Sterling 56'; B. Silva 71'; Foden 78'; Jesus 84'	Report		Stadium: Etihad Stadium; Attendance: 51,518; Referee: Clément Turpin (France)

== Statistics ==
As of end of 2018–2019 season

=== Squad statistics ===
No	Nat	Player	Age	Contract ends	Total					Bundesliga					DFB-Pokal					Champions League				
No	Nat	Player	Age	Contract ends	A	St	Goal	Yellow card	Red card	A	St	Goal	Yellow card	Red card	A	St	Goal	Yellow card	Red card	A	St	Goal	Yellow card	Red card
Goalkeepers
1	Germany	Ralf Fährmann (C)	38	30.06.2022	25	24	0	0	0	17	16	0	0	0	2	2	0	0	0	6	6	0	0	0
34	Austria	Michael Langer	41	30.06.2021	0	0	0	0	0	0	0	0	0	0	0	0	0	0	0	0	0	0	0	0
35	Germany	Alexander Nübel	30	30.06.2020	22	22	0	1	1	18	18	0	1	1	2	2	0	0	0	2	2	0	0	0
Defenders
3	Morocco	Hamza Mendyl	29	30.06.2023	16	13	0	5	0	9	7	0	5	0	1	1	0	0	0	6	5	0	0	0
5	Serbia	Matija Nastasić	33	30.06.2022	37	37	1	7	1	28	28	1	6	1	3	3	0	1	0	6	6	0	0	0
~~14~~	Ghana	Abdul Rahman Baba	32	–	4	3	0	0	0	2	2	0	0	0	1	1	0	0	0	1	0	0	0	0
17	France	Benjamin Stambouli	36	30.06.2020	27	26	0	5	0	21	20	0	3	0	1	1	0	0	0	5	5	0	2	0
21	Germany	Sascha Riether	43	30.06.2019	1	0	0	0	0	1	0	0	0	0	0	0	0	0	0	0	0	0	0	0
24	Germany	Bastian Oczipka	37	30.06.2020	25	25	1	3	0	21	21	1	3	0	2	2	0	0	0	2	2	0	0	0
26	Senegal	Salif Sané	36	30.06.2022	40	39	4	6	0	30	29	2	4	0	4	4	2	1	0	6	6	0	1	0
27	Netherlands	Jeffrey Bruma	35	30.06.2019	12	10	0	6	0	9	7	0	4	0	1	1	0	1	0	2	2	0	1	0
~~29~~	Brazil	Naldo	44	–	13	13	0	1	0	7	7	0	1	0	2	2	0	0	0	4	4	0	0	0
42	Germany	Jonas Carls	29	30.06.2022	1	1	0	0	0	1	1	0	0	0	0	0	0	0	0	0	0	0	0	0
44	Australia	George Timotheou	29	30.06.2020	1	1	0	0	0	1	1	0	0	0	0	0	0	0	0	0	0	0	0	0
Midfielders
2	USA	Weston McKennie	28	30.06.2022	33	25	2	7	0	24	19	1	6	0	3	2	0	0	0	6	4	1	1	0
6	Spain	Omar Mascarell	33	30.06.2022	19	15	0	5	0	14	11	0	2	0	2	1	0	0	0	3	3	0	3	0
8	Germany	Suat Serdar	29	30.06.2022	35	27	2	4	2	26	20	2	3	2	2	2	0	0	0	7	5	0	1	0
10	Algeria	Nabil Bentaleb	31	30.06.2021	34	25	8	6	0	25	19	3	4	0	3	2	2	2	0	6	4	3	0	0
11	Ukraine	Yevhen Konoplyanka	37	30.06.2020	21	13	1	0	1	13	7	1	0	1	2	1	0	0	0	6	5	0	0	0
13	Germany	Sebastian Rudy	36	30.06.2022	28	22	0	7	0	21	17	0	4	0	3	2	0	1	0	4	3	0	2	0
~~16~~	Germany	Johannes Geis	33	–	0	0	0	0	0	0	0	0	0	0	0	0	0	0	0	0	0	0	0	0
18	Germany	Daniel Caligiuri	38	30.06.2020	40	39	7	9	0	31	31	7	9	0	3	2	0	0	0	6	6	0	0	0
25	Morocco	Amine Harit	29	30.06.2021	25	15	1	1	0	18	12	1	1	0	2	2	0	0	0	5	1	0	0	0
28	Austria	Alessandro Schöpf	32	30.06.2021	21	15	2	4	0	15	11	1	3	0	2	1	0	1	0	4	3	1	0	0
39	Germany	Benjamin Goller	27	30.06.2019	1	1	0	1	0	0	0	0	0	0	0	0	0	0	0	1	1	0	1	0
41	Morocco	Nassim Boujellab	27	30.06.2022	8	5	0	0	0	7	4	0	0	0	1	1	0	0	0	0	0	0	0	0
Forwards
7	Germany	Mark Uth	35	30.06.2022	29	23	4	6	0	20	15	2	3	0	4	3	1	1	0	5	5	1	2	0
~~9~~	Argentina	Franco Di Santo	37	–	5	4	0	0	0	4	3	0	0	0	0	0	0	0	0	1	1	0	0	0
14	Wales	Rabbi Matondo	26	30.06.2023	8	2	0	0	0	7	1	0	0	0	1	1	0	0	0	0	0	0	0	0
15	Turkey	Ahmed Kutucu	26	30.06.2022	16	4	3	1	0	13	3	2	0	0	2	1	1	1	0	1	0	0	0	0
19	Austria	Guido Burgstaller	37	30.06.2022	33	22	5	5	0	24	17	4	4	0	3	3	0	1	0	6	2	1	0	0
22	Germany	Steven Skrzybski	33	30.06.2021	16	9	3	1	0	12	8	3	1	0	0	0	0	0	0	4	1	0	0	0
23	Germany	Cedric Teuchert	29	30.06.2021	9	3	0	0	0	5	2	0	0	0	2	0	0	0	0	2	1	0	0	0
36	Switzerland	Breel Embolo	29	30.06.2021	28	21	6	6	0	20	15	5	4	0	3	1	0	0	0	5	5	1	2	0
40	USA	Haji Wright	28	30.06.2020	7	2	1	0	0	7	2	1	0	0	0	0	0	0	0	0	0	0	0	0
Total					46		51	97	5	34		37	71	5	4		6	10	0	8		8	16	0

Players in grey left the club during the season.

=== Goalscorers ===
Rank	Position	Nat	Name	Bundesliga	DFB-Pokal	Champions League	Total
1	MF	(Algeria)	Nabil Bentaleb	3	2	3	8
2	MF	(Germany)	Daniel Caligiuri	7	0	0	7
3	FW	(Switzerland)	Breel Embolo	5	0	1	6
4	FW	(Austria)	Guido Burgstaller	4	0	1	5
5	DF	(Senegal)	Salif Sané	2	2	0	4
5	FW	(Germany)	Mark Uth	2	1	1	4
7	FW	(Turkey)	Ahmed Kutucu	2	1	0	3
7	FW	(Germany)	Steven Skrzybski	3	0	0	3
9	MF	(United States)	Weston McKennie	1	0	1	2
9	MF	(Austria)	Alessandro Schöpf	1	0	1	2
9	MF	(Germany)	Suat Serdar	2	0	0	2
12	MF	(Morocco)	Amine Harit	1	0	0	1
12	MF	(Ukraine)	Yevhen Konoplyanka	1	0	0	1
12	DF	(Serbia)	Matija Nastasić	1	0	0	1
12	DF	(Germany)	Bastian Oczipka	1	0	0	1
12	FW	(United States)	Haji Wright	1	0	0	1
Own goals				0	1	0	1
Total				37	7	8	52

=== Clean sheets ===
Rank	Name	Bundesliga	DFB-Pokal	Champions League	Total
1	(Germany) Ralf Fährmann	3	1	2	6
1	(Germany) Alexander Nübel	4	0	2	6
