= 2017–18 FC Schalke 04 season =

Schalke 04
2017–18 season
- President: Clemens Tönnies
- Manager: Domenico Tedesco
- Stadium: Veltins-Arena
- Bundesliga: 2nd
- DFB-Pokal: Semi-finals
- Top goalscorer: League: Guido Burgstaller (11); All: Guido Burgstaller (13)
- Highest home attendance: 62,271
- Lowest home attendance: 50,642
- Average home league attendance: 61,297
- Biggest win: BFC Dynamo 0–2 Schalke; Schalke 2–0 Leipzig; Schalke 3–1 Stuttgart; Hertha 0–2 Schalke; Schalke 2–0 Mainz 05; Wiesbaden 1–3 Schalke; Schalke 2–0 Hamburg; Stuttgart 0–2 Schalke; Leverkusen 0–2 Schalke; Schalke 2–0 Freiburg; Schalke 2–0 Dortmund
- Biggest defeat: Schalke 0–3 Bayern
Home colours	Away colours	Third colours

The 2017–18 FC Schalke 04 season was the 114th season in the football club's history and 27th consecutive and 50th overall season in the top flight of German football, the Bundesliga, having been promoted from the 2. Bundesliga in 1991. In addition to the domestic league, Schalke 04 are also participating in this season's edition of the domestic cup, the DFB-Pokal. This is the 17th season for Schalke in the Veltins-Arena, located in Gelsenkirchen, North Rhine-Westphalia. The season covers a period from 1 July 2017 to 30 June 2018.

The season was the first since 2006-07 without Benedikt Höwedes, who departed to Juventus on a loan.

== Players ==
=== Squad information ===
As of 29 January 2018

Note: Flags indicate national team as defined under FIFA eligibility rules; some limited exceptions apply. Players may hold more than one non-FIFA nationality.

No.	Pos.	Nation	Player
1	GK	GER	Ralf Fährmann (captain)
2	MF	USA	Weston McKennie
3	DF	ESP	Pablo Insua
5	DF	SRB	Matija Nastasić
7	MF	GER	Max Meyer
8	MF	GER	Leon Goretzka (vice-captain)
9	FW	ARG	Franco Di Santo
10	MF	ALG	Nabil Bentaleb
11	MF	UKR	Yevhen Konoplyanka
14	DF	GHA	Baba Rahman (on loan from Chelsea)
17	MF	FRA	Benjamin Stambouli
18	MF	GER	Daniel Caligiuri
19	FW	AUT	Guido Burgstaller

No.	Pos.	Nation	Player
20	DF	GER	Thilo Kehrer
21	DF	GER	Sascha Riether
22	FW	CRO	Marko Pjaca (on loan from Juventus)
23	FW	GER	Cedric Teuchert
24	DF	GER	Bastian Oczipka
25	MF	MAR	Amine Harit
28	MF	AUT	Alessandro Schöpf
29	DF	BRA	Naldo
32	FW	GHA	Bernard Tekpetey
34	GK	AUT	Michael Langer
35	GK	GER	Alexander Nübel
36	FW	SUI	Breel Embolo

=== Transfers ===
==== In ====
No.	Pos	Player	From	Type	Window	Ends	Fee	Source
23	FW	(Germany) Cedric Teuchert	(Germany) 1. FC Nürnberg	Transfer	Winter	2021	€1,000,000	
22	FW	(Croatia) Marko Pjaca	(Italy) Juventus	Loan	Winter	2018	€800,000	
14	DF	(Ghana) Baba Rahman	(England) Chelsea	Loan	Winter	2019	Free	
32	MF	(Ghana) Bernard Tekpetey	(Austria) SCR Altach	End of Loan	Winter	2020	—	
10	MF	(Algeria) Nabil Bentaleb	(England) Tottenham Hotspur	Transfer	Summer	2021	€19,000,000	
11	MF	(Ukraine) Yevhen Konoplyanka	(Spain) Sevilla	Transfer	Summer	2020	€12,500,000	
25	MF	(Morocco) Amine Harit	(France) Nantes	Transfer	Summer	2021	€8,000,000	
24	DF	(Germany) Bastian Oczipka	(Germany) Eintracht Frankfurt	Transfer	Summer	2020	€4,500,000	
3	DF	(Spain) Pablo Insua	(Spain) Deportivo La Coruña	Transfer	Summer	2021	€3,500,000	
21	DF	(Germany) Sascha Riether	Free agent	Transfer	Season (Matchday 8)	2018	—	
34	GK	(Austria) Michael Langer	(Sweden) IFK Norrköping	Transfer	Summer	2019	Free	
30	FW	(United States) Haji Wright	(Germany) Schalke 04 U19	Promoted	Summer	2020	—	—
2	MF	(United States) Weston McKennie	(Germany) Schalke 04 U19	Promoted	Summer	2022	—	—
21	MF	(Germany) Luke Hemmerich	(Germany) Schalke 04 U19	Promoted	Summer	2020	—	—
16	FW	(Germany) Fabian Reese	(Germany) Karlsruher SC	End of loan	Summer	2019	—	—
15	FW	(Germany) Felix Platte	(Germany) Darmstadt 98	End of loan	Summer	2018	—	—
18	MF	(Germany) Sidney Sam	(Germany) Darmstadt 98	End of loan	Summer	2018	—	—
34	GK	(Germany) Fabian Giefer	(England) Bristol City	End of loan	Summer	2018	—	—

==== Out ====
No.	Pos	Player	To	Type	Window	Fee	Source
23	DF	(Spain) Coke	(Spain) Levante	Loan	Winter	Free	
16	FW	(Germany) Fabian Reese	(Germany) SpVgg Greuther Fürth	Loan	Winter	Free	
33	FW	(Kosovo) Donis Avdijaj	(Netherlands) Roda JC Kerkrade	Loan	Winter	Free	
15	FW	(Germany) Felix Platte	(Germany) Darmstadt 98	Transfer	Summer	€800,000	
34	GK	(Germany) Fabian Giefer	(Germany) FC Augsburg	Transfer	Summer	€750,000	
25	FW	(Netherlands) Klaas-Jan Huntelaar	(Netherlands) Ajax	Transfer	Summer	Free	
6	DF	(Bosnia and Herzegovina) Sead Kolašinac	(England) Arsenal	Transfer	Summer	Free	
30	GK	(Germany) Timon Wellenreuther	(Netherlands) Willem II	Transfer	Summer	Free	
13	MF	(Cameroon) Eric Maxim Choupo-Moting	(England) Stoke City	Transfer	Summer	Free	
15	DF	(Germany) Dennis Aogo	(Germany) VfB Stuttgart	Transfer	Summer	Free	
22	DF	(Japan) Atsuto Uchida	(Germany) Union Berlin	Transfer	Summer	Free	
40	MF	(Germany) Sidney Sam	(Germany) VfL Bochum	Transfer	Summer	Free	
27	DF	(Germany) Sascha Riether	Free agent	—	Summer	—	—
4	DF	(Germany) Benedikt Höwedes	(Italy) Juventus	Loan	Summer	€3,500,000	
6	MF	(Germany) Johannes Geis	(Spain) Sevilla	Loan	Summer	€2,000,000	
32	FW	(Ghana) Bernard Tekpetey	(Austria) Rheindorf Altach	Loan	Summer	Free	
30	FW	(United States) Haji Wright	(Germany) SV Sandhausen	Loan	Summer	Free	
21	MF	(Germany) Luke Hemmerich	(Germany) VfL Bochum	Loan	Summer	Free	
10	MF	(Algeria) Nabil Bentaleb	(England) Tottenham Hotspur	End of loan	Summer	—	—
11	MF	(Ukraine) Yevhen Konoplyanka	(Spain) Sevilla	End of loan	Summer	—	—
14	DF	(Ghana) Baba Rahman	(England) Chelsea	End of loan	Summer	—	—
24	DF	(Germany) Holger Badstuber	(Germany) Bayern Munich	End of loan	Summer	—	—

== Club ==
=== Kit ===
Supplier: Adidas / Sponsor: Gazprom

Home	Home alt.	Home alt. 2	Home alt. 3	Away	Away alt.	Third	Third

== Friendly matches ==
Win Draw Loss

8 July 2017 Friendly	SpVgg Erkenschwick	1–9	Schalke 04	Oer-Erkenschwick, Germany
19:00 CEST (UTC+2)	Sascha Drepper 78'	Report	Avdijaj 9'; Konoplyanka 16', 27'; Uchida 48', 52'; Wright 60', 63', 66', 74'	Stadium: Stimbergstadion; Attendance: 5,187; Referee: Tim Zahnhausen (Germany)

15 July 2017 Friendly	SC Paderborn	0–1	Schalke 04	Paderborn, Germany
14:05 CEST (UTC+2)		Report	Konoplyanka 20'	Stadium: Benteler-Arena; Attendance: 8,017; Referee: Sven Waschitzki (Germany)

19 July 2017 Friendly	Beşiktaş	2–3	Schalke 04	Zhuhai, China
20:00 CST (UTC+8); 14:00 CEST (UTC+2)	Tosun 68', 75'	Report	Harit 42'; Hemmerich 57'; Konoplyanka 63'	Stadium: ZhuHai Sports Center; Attendance: 6,500; Referee: Li Haixin (China)

21 July 2017 Friendly	Internazionale	1–1	Schalke 04	Changzhou, China
19:30 CST (UTC+8); 13:30 CEST (UTC+2)	Murillo 73'	Report	Caligiuri 60'	Stadium: Changzhou Olympic Sports Center; Attendance: 20,000; Referee: Gu Chunhan (China)

26 July 2017 Friendly	Neftçi	0–1	Schalke 04	Neukirchen am Großvenediger, Austria
18:00 CEST (UTC+2)		Report	Tekpetey 27'	Stadium: Wildkogel-Arena; Attendance: 1,000; Referee: Thomas Hochstaffl (Austria)

30 July 2017 Friendly	Eibar	0–1	Schalke 04	Mittersill, Austria
17:30 CEST (UTC+2)		Report	José Ángel 70' (o.g.)	Stadium: Waldstadion; Attendance: 2,500; Referee: Christopher Jäger (Austria)

5 August 2017 Friendly	Crystal Palace	1–1	Schalke 04	London, England
16:00 CEST (UTC+2)	Benteke 61'	Report	Insua 43'	Stadium: Selhurst Park

31 August 2017 Friendly	FC Gütersloh 2000	0–9	Schalke 04	Gütersloh, Germany
19:00 CEST (UTC+2)		Report	Coke 28', 30'; Meyer 36', 64', 84', 86'; Embolo 49', 57'; Oczipka 67'	Stadium: Heidewaldstadion; Attendance: 4,032; Referee: Dr. Michael Negri (Germany)

7 January 2018 Friendly	KRC Genk	1–2	Schalke 04	Benidorm, Spain
14:30 CET (UTC+1)	Karelis 88'		Pjaca 49'; Embolo 80'	Stadium: Estadio Municipal Guillermo Amor; Attendance: 800; Referee: Campo Hernandez (Spain)

== Competitions ==
Win Draw Loss

=== Overview ===
Competition	First match	Last match	Starting round	Final position	Record							
Competition	First match	Last match	Starting round	Final position	Pld	W	D	L	GF	GA	GD	Win %
Bundesliga	19 August 2017	12 May 2018	Matchday 1	2nd	34	18	9	7	53	37	+16	52.94
DFB-Pokal	14 August 2017	18 April 2018	First round	Semi-finals	5	4	0	1	7	2	+5	80.00
Total					39	22	9	8	60	39	+21	56.41

Last updated: 21 May 2018
Source: Competitions

=== Bundesliga ===
==== League table ====
Pos	Team	Pld	W	D	L	GF	GA	GD	Pts	Qualification or relegation
1	Bayern Munich (C)	34	27	3	4	92	28	+64	84	Qualification for the Champions League group stage
2	Schalke 04	34	18	9	7	53	37	+16	63	Qualification for the Champions League group stage
3	1899 Hoffenheim	34	15	10	9	66	48	+18	55	Qualification for the Champions League group stage
4	Borussia Dortmund	34	15	10	9	64	47	+17	55	Qualification for the Champions League group stage
5	Bayer Leverkusen	34	15	10	9	58	44	+14	55	Qualification for the Europa League group stage

Source: DFB
Rules for classification: 1) Points; 2) Goal difference; 3) Goals scored; 4) Head-to-head results; 5) Head-to-head away goals scored; 6) Away goals scored; 7) Play-off.
(C) Champions

==== Results summary ====
Overall								Home						Away					
Pld	W	D	L	GF	GA	GD	Pts	W	D	L	GF	GA	GD	W	D	L	GF	GA	GD
34	18	9	7	53	37	+16	63	10	5	2	27	15	+12	8	4	5	26	22	+4

Last updated: 21 May 2018.
Source: Bundesliga

==== Results by round ====
Round	1	2	3	4	5	6	7	8	9	10	11	12	13	14	15	16	17	18	19	20	21	22	23	24	25	26	27	28	29	30	31	32	33	34
Ground	H	A	H	A	H	A	H	A	H	H	A	H	A	H	A	H	A	A	H	A	H	A	H	A	H	A	A	H	A	H	A	H	A	H
Result	W	L	W	W	L	L	D	W	W	D	W	W	D	D	D	W	D	L	D	W	L	L	W	W	W	W	W	W	L	W	D	D	W	W
Position	3	8	5	4	6	7	9	6	5	5	4	2	3	3	3	2	2	3	3	3	5	6	6	3	2	2	2	2	2	2	2	2	2	2

Updated to match(es) played on 21 May 2018. Source: Bundesliga
A = Away; H = Home; W = Win; D = Draw; L = Loss

==== Matches ====
19 August 2017 1	Schalke 04	2–0	RB Leipzig	Gelsenkirchen
18:30 CEST (UTC+2)	Bentaleb 43' (pen.); Konoplyanka 73'	Report		Stadium: Veltins-Arena; Attendance: 61,435; Referee: Felix Zwayer

27 August 2017 2	Hannover 96	1–0	Schalke 04	Hanover
18:00 CEST (UTC+2)	Jonathas 67'	Report		Stadium: HDI-Arena; Attendance: 49,000; Referee: Patrick Ittrich

10 September 2017 3	Schalke 04	3–1	VfB Stuttgart	Gelsenkirchen
18:00 CEST (UTC+2)	Bentaleb 4' (pen.); Naldo 47'; Burgstaller 48'	Report	Akolo 40'	Stadium: Veltins-Arena; Attendance: 61,098; Referee: Frank Willenborg

16 September 2017 4	Werder Bremen	1–2	Schalke 04	Bremen
15:30 CEST (UTC+2)	Sané 20'	Report	Veljković 22' (o.g.); Goretzka 83'	Stadium: Weser-Stadion; Attendance: 42,100; Referee: Benjamin Brand

19 September 2017 5	Schalke 04	0–3	Bayern Munich	Gelsenkirchen
20:30 CEST (UTC+2)		Report	Lewandowski 25' (pen.); Rodríguez 29'; Vidal 75'	Stadium: Veltins-Arena; Attendance: 62,271; Referee: Marco Fritz

23 September 2017 6	1899 Hoffenheim	2–0	Schalke 04	Sinsheim
15:30 CEST (UTC+2)	Geiger 13'; Rupp 90+3'	Report		Stadium: Wirsol Rhein-Neckar-Arena; Attendance: 30,150; Referee: Sascha Stegemann

29 September 2017 7	Schalke 04	1–1	Bayer Leverkusen	Gelsenkirchen
20:30 CEST (UTC+2)	Goretzka 34'	Report	Bailey 61'	Stadium: Veltins-Arena; Attendance: 61,515; Referee: Guido Winkmann

14 October 2017 8	Hertha BSC	0–2	Schalke 04	Berlin
15:30 CEST (UTC+2)		Report	Goretzka 54' (pen.); Burgstaller 78'	Stadium: Olympiastadion Berlin; Attendance: 50,590; Referee: Benjamin Brand

20 October 2017 9	Schalke 04	2–0	Mainz 05	Gelsenkirchen
20:30 CEST (UTC+2)	Goretzka 13'; Burgstaller 74'	Report		Stadium: Veltins-Arena; Attendance: 59,476; Referee: Bibiana Steinhaus

28 October 2017 10	Schalke 04	1–1	VfL Wolfsburg	Gelsenkirchen
15:30 CEST (UTC+2)	Bentaleb 43' (pen.)	Report	Origi 90+3'	Stadium: Veltins-Arena; Attendance: 60,429; Referee: Markus Schmidt

4 November 2017 11	SC Freiburg	0–1	Schalke 04	Freiburg
15:30 CET (UTC+1)		Report	Caligiuri 62'	Stadium: Schwarzwald-Stadion; Attendance: 24,000; Referee: Felix Brych

19 November 2017 12	Schalke 04	2–0	Hamburger SV	Gelsenkirchen
15:30 CET (UTC+1)	Di Santo 17' (pen.); Burgstaller 77'	Report		Stadium: Veltins-Arena; Attendance: 62,271; Referee: Robert Hartmann

25 November 2017 13	Borussia Dortmund	4–4	Schalke 04	Dortmund
15:30 CET (UTC+1)	Aubameyang 12'; Stambouli 18' (o.g.); Götze 20'; Guerreiro 25'	Report	Burgstaller 61'; Harit 65'; Caligiuri 86'; Naldo 90+4'	Stadium: Signal Iduna Park; Attendance: 80,179; Referee: Deniz Aytekin

2 December 2017 14	Schalke 04	2–2	1. FC Köln	Gelsenkirchen
18:30 CET (UTC+1)	Burgstaller 36'; Harit 72'	Report	Guirassy 50', 77' (pen.)	Stadium: Veltins-Arena; Attendance: 61,761; Referee: Tobias Stieler

9 December 2017 15	Borussia Mönchengladbach	1–1	Schalke 04	Mönchengladbach
18:30 CET (UTC+1)	Kramer 24'	Report	Vestergaard 62' (o.g.)	Stadium: Borussia-Park; Attendance: 54,018; Referee: Sascha Stegemann

13 December 2017 16	Schalke 04	3–2	FC Augsburg	Gelsenkirchen
20:30 CET (UTC+1)	Di Santo 44'; Burgstaller 47'; Caligiuri 83' (pen.)	Report	Caiuby 64'; Gregoritsch 79' (pen.)	Stadium: Veltins-Arena; Attendance: 59,215; Referee: Sven Jablonski

16 December 2017 17	Eintracht Frankfurt	2–2	Schalke 04	Frankfurt
15:30 CET (UTC+1)	Jović 2'; Haller 65'	Report	Embolo 82'; Naldo 90+5'	Stadium: Commerzbank-Arena; Attendance: 50,600; Referee: Robert Kampka

13 January 2018 18	RB Leipzig	3–1	Schalke 04	Leipzig
18:30 CET (UTC+1)	Keïta 41'; Werner 69'; Bruma 71'	Report	Naldo 55'	Stadium: Red Bull Arena; Attendance: 42,558; Referee: Deniz Aytekin

21 January 2018 19	Schalke 04	1–1	Hannover 96	Gelsenkirchen
18:00 CET (UTC+1)	Pjaca 16'	Report	Füllkrug 86'	Stadium: Veltins-Arena; Attendance: 60,650; Referee: Martin Petersen

27 January 2018 20	VfB Stuttgart	0–2	Schalke 04	Stuttgart
15:30 CET (UTC+1)		Report	Naldo 14'; Harit 19' (pen.)	Stadium: Mercedes-Benz Arena; Attendance: 55,096; Referee: Felix Zwayer

3 February 2018 21	Schalke 04	1–2	Werder Bremen	Gelsenkirchen
15:30 CET (UTC+1)	Konoplyanka 24'	Report	Kruse 79'; Junuzović 90+3'	Stadium: Veltins-Arena; Attendance: 62,271; Referee: Guido Winkmann

10 February 2018 22	Bayern Munich	2–1	Schalke 04	Munich
18:30 CET (UTC+1)	Lewandowski 6'; Müller 36'	Report	Di Santo 29'	Stadium: Allianz Arena; Attendance: 75,000; Referee: Tobias Stieler

17 February 2018 23	Schalke 04	2–1	1899 Hoffenheim	Gelsenkirchen
18:30 CET (UTC+1)	Kehrer 11'; Embolo 28'	Report	Kramarić 78'	Stadium: Veltins-Arena; Attendance: 60,741; Referee: Benjamin Brand

25 February 2018 24	Bayer Leverkusen	0–2	Schalke 04	Leverkusen
15:30 CET (UTC+1)		Report	Burgstaller 11'; Bentaleb 89' (pen.)	Stadium: BayArena; Attendance: 30,210; Referee: Daniel Siebert

3 March 2018 25	Schalke 04	1–0	Hertha BSC	Gelsenkirchen
15:30 CET (UTC+1)	Pjaca 37'	Report		Stadium: Veltins-Arena; Attendance: 61,578; Referee: Sascha Stegemann

9 March 2018 26	Mainz 05	0–1	Schalke 04	Mainz
20:30 CET (UTC+1)		Report	Caligiuri 55'	Stadium: Opel Arena; Attendance: 30,655; Referee: Felix Brych

17 March 2018 27	VfL Wolfsburg	0–1	Schalke 04	Wolfsburg
18:30 CET (UTC+1)		Report	Knoche 86' (o.g.)	Stadium: Volkswagen Arena; Attendance: 27,502; Referee: Benjamin Cortus

31 March 2018 28	Schalke 04	2–0	SC Freiburg	Gelsenkirchen
15:30 CEST (UTC+2)	Caligiuri 63' (pen.); Burgstaller 73'	Report		Stadium: Veltins-Arena; Attendance: 61,688; Referee: Tobias Stieler

7 April 2018 29	Hamburger SV	3–2	Schalke 04	Hamburg
18:30 CEST (UTC+2)	Kostić 17'; Holtby 52'; Hunt 84'	Report	Naldo 9'; Burgstaller 63'	Stadium: Volksparkstadion; Attendance: 54,137; Referee: Christian Dingert

15 April 2018 30	Schalke 04	2–0	Borussia Dortmund	Gelsenkirchen
15:30 CEST (UTC+2)	Konoplyanka 50'; Naldo 82'	Report		Stadium: Veltins-Arena; Attendance: 61,786; Referee: Manuel Gräfe

22 April 2018 31	1. FC Köln	2–2	Schalke 04	Cologne
18:00 CEST (UTC+2)	Bittencourt 26'; Risse 83'	Report	Embolo 4'; Konoplyanka 23'	Stadium: RheinEnergieStadion; Attendance: 50,000; Referee: Marco Fritz

28 April 2018 32	Schalke 04	1–1	Borussia Mönchengladbach	Gelsenkirchen
15:30 CEST (UTC+2)	Caligiuri 45+3' (pen.)	Report	Raffael 32'	Stadium: Veltins-Arena; Attendance: 62,271; Referee: Harm Osmers

5 May 2018 33	FC Augsburg	1–2	Schalke 04	Augsburg
15:30 CEST (UTC+2)	Max 27'	Report	Kehrer 23', 34'	Stadium: WWK Arena; Attendance: 30,660; Referee: Robert Kampka

12 May 2018 34	Schalke 04	1–0	Eintracht Frankfurt	Gelsenkirchen
15:30 CEST (UTC+2)	Burgstaller 26'	Report		Stadium: Veltins-Arena; Attendance: 61,585; Referee: Frank Willenborg

=== DFB-Pokal ===
14 August 2017 First round	BFC Dynamo	0–2	Schalke 04	Berlin
18:30 CEST (UTC+2)		Report	Konoplyanka 78', 90+1'	Stadium: Friedrich-Ludwig-Jahn-Sportpark; Attendance: 14,117; Referee: Arne Aarnink

24 October 2017 Second round	Wehen Wiesbaden	1–3	Schalke 04	Wiesbaden
18:30 CEST (UTC+2)	Blacha 76'	Report	Di Santo 26'; Burgstaller 30'; Mintzel 53' (o.g.)	Stadium: Brita-Arena; Attendance: 11,373; Referee: Sven Jablonski

19 December 2017 Round of 16	Schalke 04	1–0	1. FC Köln	Gelsenkirchen
20:45 CET (UTC+1)	Meyer 63'	Report		Stadium: Veltins-Arena; Attendance: 56,392; Referee: Robert Hartmann

7 February 2018 Quarter-finals	Schalke 04	1–0	VfL Wolfsburg	Gelsenkirchen
20:45 CET (UTC+1)	Burgstaller 10'	Report		Stadium: Veltins-Arena; Attendance: 50,642; Referee: Christian Dingert

18 April 2018 Semi-finals	Schalke 04	0–1	Eintracht Frankfurt	Gelsenkirchen
20:45 CEST (UTC+2)		Report	Jović 75'	Stadium: Veltins-Arena; Attendance: 60,000; Referee: Robert Hartmann

== Statistics ==
=== Appearances and goals ===
Squad Season 2017–18
No	NAT	Player	Age	Contract ends	All A	Goal	Yellow card	(yellow card) (red card)	Red card	BL A	BL	Yellow card	(yellow card) (red card)	Red card	Cup A	Cup	Yellow card	(yellow card) (red card)	Red card
Goalkeepers
1	Germany	Ralf Fährmann (C)	38	30.06.2020	39 (0)	0	1	0	0	34 (0)	0	1	0	0	5 (0)	0	0	0	0
34	Austria	Michael Langer	41	30.06.2019	0 (0)	0	0	0	0	0 (0)	0	0	0	0	0 (0)	0	0	0	0
35	Germany	Alexander Nübel	30	30.06.2020	0 (1)	0	0	0	0	0 (1)	0	0	0	0	0 (0)	0	0	0	0
Defenders
3	Spain	Pablo Insua	33	30.06.2021	0 (1)	0	1	0	0	0 (1)	0	1	0	0	0 (0)	0	0	0	0
5	Serbia	Matija Nastasić	33	30.06.2019	25 (2)	0	5	1	0	22 (2)	0	5	1	0	3 (0)	0	0	0	0
14	Ghana	Baba Rahman	32	30.06.2019	0 (1)	0	0	0	0	0 (1)	0	0	0	0	0 (0)	0	0	0	0
20	Germany	Thilo Kehrer	30	30.06.2019	31 (1)	3	5	0	0	26 (1)	3	4	0	0	5 (0)	0	1	0	0
21	Germany	Sascha Riether	43	30.06.2018	0 (0)	0	0	0	0	0 (0)	0	0	0	0	0 (0)	0	0	0	0
23	Spain	Coke	39	30.06.2019	1 (1)	0	1	0	0	0 (1)	0	1	0	0	1 (0)	0	0	0	0
24	Germany	Bastian Oczipka	37	30.06.2020	30 (3)	0	3	0	0	26 (3)	0	2	0	0	4 (0)	0	1	0	0
29	Brazil	Naldo	44	30.06.2019	38 (0)	7	5	0	0	34 (0)	7	4	0	0	4 (0)	0	1	0	0
	Germany	Joshua Bitter	29	30.06.2019	0 (0)	0	0	0	0	0 (0)	0	0	0	0	0 (0)	0	0	0	0
Midfielders
2	USA	Weston McKennie	28	30.06.2022	14 (11)	0	3	0	0	13 (10)	0	3	0	0	1 (1)	0	0	0	0
7	Germany	Max Meyer	31	30.06.2018	23 (4)	1	6	0	0	20 (3)	0	6	0	0	3 (1)	1	0	0	0
8	Germany	Leon Goretzka	31	30.06.2018	23 (6)	4	3	0	0	21 (5)	4	3	0	0	2 (1)	0	0	0	0
10	Algeria	Nabil Bentaleb	31	30.06.2021	15 (4)	4	3	0	1	12 (4)	4	3	0	1	3 (0)	0	0	0	0
11	Ukraine	Yevhen Konoplyanka	37	30.06.2020	20 (10)	6	1	0	0	18 (9)	4	1	0	0	2 (1)	2	0	0	0
17	France	Benjamin Stambouli	36	30.06.2020	27 (5)	0	4	0	0	24 (4)	0	4	0	0	3 (1)	0	0	0	0
18	Italy	Daniel Caligiuri	38	30.06.2020	35 (2)	6	4	0	0	32 (1)	6	4	0	0	3 (1)	0	0	0	0
25	Morocco	Amine Harit	29	30.06.2021	27 (8)	3	4	0	0	23 (8)	3	3	0	0	4 (0)	0	1	0	0
28	Austria	Alessandro Schöpf	32	30.06.2021	12 (7)	0	3	0	0	9 (7)	0	3	0	0	3 (0)	0	0	0	0
32	Ghana	Bernard Tekpetey	29	30.06.2020	0 (0)	0	0	0	0	0 (0)	0	0	0	0	0 (0)	0	0	0	0
Forwards
9	Argentina	Franco Di Santo	37	30.06.2019	24 (10)	4	4	0	0	22 (8)	3	4	0	0	2 (2)	1	0	0	0
16	Germany	Fabian Reese	28	30.06.2019	0 (7)	0	0	0	0	0 (7)	0	0	0	0	0 (0)	0	0	0	0
19	Austria	Guido Burgstaller	37	30.06.2020	29 (8)	13	9	0	0	23 (8)	11	8	0	0	5 (0)	2	1	0	0
22	Croatia	Marko Pjaca	31	30.06.2018	5 (4)	2	0	0	0	3 (4)	2	0	0	0	2 (0)	0	0	0	0
23	Germany	Cedric Teuchert	29	30.06.2021	0 (6)	0	0	0	0	0 (4)	0	0	0	0	0 (2)	0	0	0	0
33	Kosovo	Donis Avdijaj	30	30.06.2019	0 (0)	0	0	0	0	0 (0)	0	0	0	0	0 (0)	0	0	0	0
36	Switzerland	Breel Embolo	29	30.06.2021	9 (14)	3	4	0	0	9 (12)	3	4	0	0	0 (2)	0	0	0	0
	Germany	Felix Schröter	30	30.06.2018	0 (0)	0	0	0	0	0 (0)	0	0	0	0	0 (0)	0	0	0	0
Total					—	56	67	1	1	—	50	62	1	1	—	6	5	0	0
Last updated: 13 May 2018

Players in white left the club during the season.

=== Goalscorers ===
As of 13 May 2018

Rank	Position	Name	Bundesliga	DFB-Pokal	Total
1	FW	(Austria) Guido Burgstaller	11	2	13
2	DF	(Brazil) Naldo	7	0	7
3	MF	(Italy) Daniel Caligiuri	6	0	6
3	MF	(Ukraine) Yevhen Konoplyanka	4	2	6
5	MF	(Algeria) Nabil Bentaleb	4	0	4
5	FW	(Argentina) Franco Di Santo	3	1	4
5	MF	(Germany) Leon Goretzka	4	0	4
8	FW	(Switzerland) Breel Embolo	3	0	3
8	MF	(Morocco) Amine Harit	3	0	3
8	DF	(Germany) Thilo Kehrer	3	0	3
11	FW	(Croatia) Marko Pjaca	2	0	2
12	MF	(Germany) Max Meyer	0	1	1
Own goals			3	1	4
Total			53	7	60

=== Clean sheets ===
As of 13 May 2018

Rank	Name	Bundesliga	DFB-Pokal	Total
1	(Germany) Ralf Fährmann	13	3	16
2	(Germany) Alexander Nübel	1	0	1
Total		13	3	16

=== Disciplinary record ===
As of 13 May 2018

Rank	Position	Name	Bundesliga			DFB-Pokal			Total		
Rank	Position	Name	Yellow card	(yellow card) (yellow-red card)	Red card	Yellow card	(yellow card) (yellow-red card)	Red card	Yellow card	(yellow card) (yellow-red card)	Red card
1	FW	(Austria) Guido Burgstaller	8	0	0	1	0	0	9	0	0
2	DF	(Serbia) Matija Nastasić	5	1	0	0	0	0	5	1	0
3	MF	(Germany) Max Mayer	6	0	0	0	0	0	6	0	0
4	DF	(Germany) Thilo Kehrer	4	0	0	1	0	0	5	0	0
4	DF	(Brazil) Naldo	4	0	0	1	0	0	5	0	0
6	MF	(Algeria) Nabil Bentaleb	3	0	1	0	0	0	3	0	1
7	MF	(Italy) Daniel Caligiuri	4	0	0	0	0	0	4	0	0
7	FW	(Argentina) Franco Di Santo	4	0	0	0	0	0	4	0	0
7	FW	(Switzerland) Breel Embolo	4	0	0	0	0	0	4	0	0
7	MF	(Morocco) Amine Harit	3	0	0	1	0	0	4	0	0
7	MF	(France) Benjamin Stambouli	4	0	0	0	0	0	4	0	0
12	MF	(Germany) Leon Goretzka	3	0	0	0	0	0	3	0	0
12	MF	(United States) Weston McKennie	3	0	0	0	0	0	3	0	0
12	DF	(Germany) Bastian Oczipka	2	0	0	1	0	0	3	0	0
12	MF	(Austria) Alessandro Schöpf	3	0	0	0	0	0	3	0	0
16	DF	(Spain) Coke	1	0	0	0	0	0	1	0	0
16	GK	(Germany) Ralf Fährmann	1	0	0	0	0	0	1	0	0
16	DF	(Spain) Pablo Insua	1	0	0	0	0	0	1	0	0
16	MF	(Ukraine) Yevhen Konoplyanka	1	0	0	0	0	0	1	0	0
Total			62	1	1	5	0	0	67	1	1
