= Franco Di Santo =

Argentine footballer

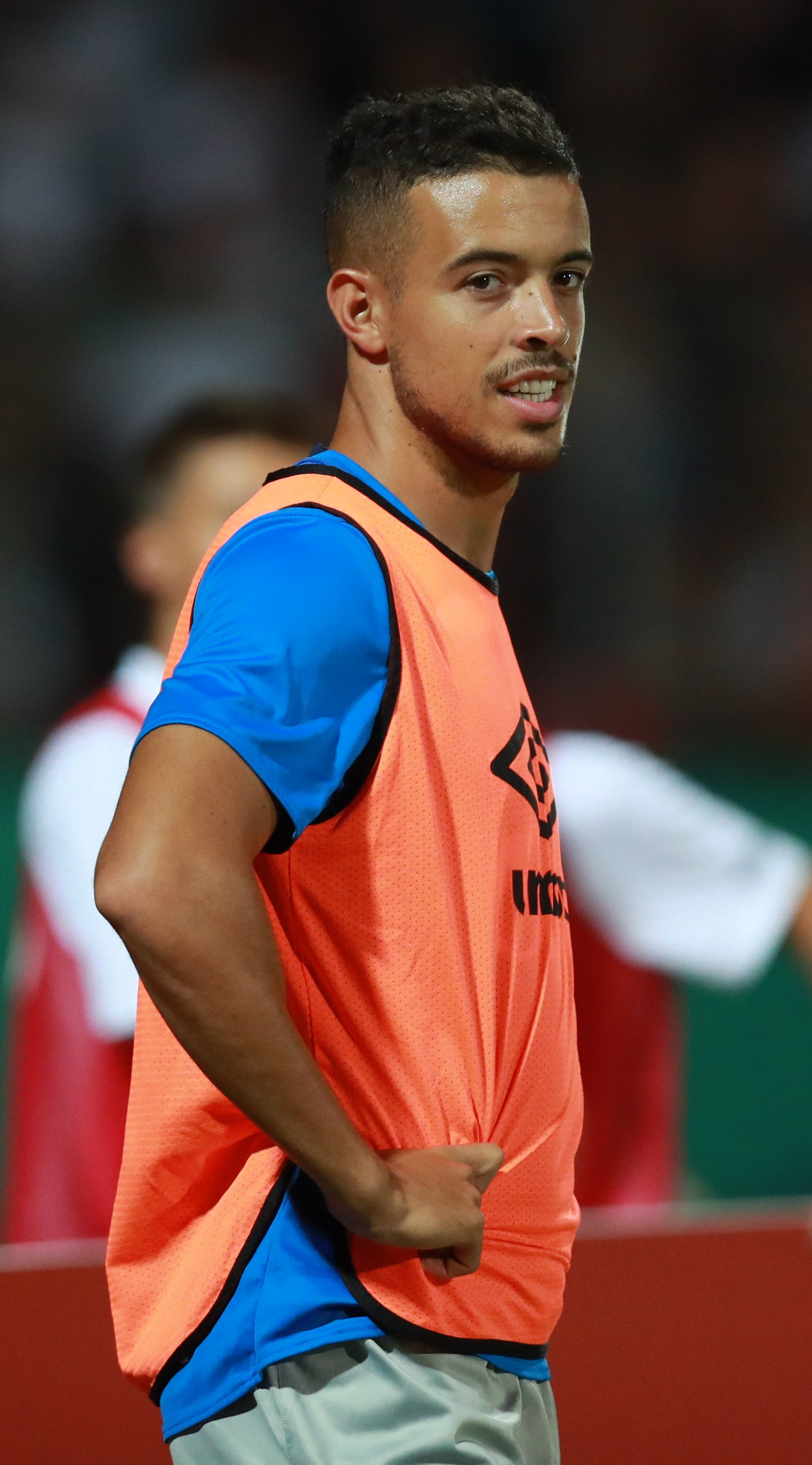
- Di Santo with Schalke 04 in 2018

Personal information
- Full name: Franco Matías Di Santo
- Date of birth: 7 April 1989 (age 37)
- Place of birth: Mendoza, Argentina
- Height: 6 ft 4 in (1.93 m)
- Position: Striker

Youth career
- 2005–2006: Audax Italiano

Senior career*
Years	Team	Apps	(Gls)
2006–2008	Audax Italiano	61	(14)
2008–2010	Chelsea	8	(0)
2009–2010	→ Blackburn Rovers (loan)	22	(1)
2010–2013	Wigan Athletic	92	(13)
2013–2015	Werder Bremen	49	(17)
2015–2019	Schalke 04	71	(5)
2019	Rayo Vallecano	6	(0)
2019–2020	Atlético Mineiro	21	(3)
2020–2022	San Lorenzo	33	(10)
2022	Göztepe	15	(3)
2022	Tijuana	15	(2)
2023	Universidad Católica	20	(2)
2024	Independiente Rivadavia	1	(0)
Total		414	(70)

International career
2006–2009	Argentina U20	25	(5)
2012–2013	Argentina	3	(0)
- * Club domestic league appearances and goals

Franco Matías Di Santo (Spanish pronunciation: [ˈfɾaŋko ði ˈsanto]; born 7 April 1989) is an Argentine former professional footballer who played as a striker.

Di Santo began his career at Chilean club Audax Italiano, earning a £3.4 million move to Chelsea in 2008 and a first-team place following good form in the reserves. After a season on loan at Blackburn Rovers, he moved to Wigan Athletic for £2 million in 2010, where he won the FA Cup in 2013. After totalling 14 goals in 122 Premier League matches, he was released following Wigan's relegation to the Championship in 2013. He then moved to Werder Bremen in Germany, spending two seasons there, before making a controversial switch to rivals Schalke 04.

Di Santo has represented the Argentina national football team on three occasions. He was nicknamed 'Crespito' (Little Crespo) after former Argentinian striker Hernán Crespo (who was nicknamed 'Valdanito', after Jorge Valdano).

== Club career ==
=== Audax Italiano ===
Born in Mendoza, Mendoza Province, Di Santo began his club career in the Chilean team Audax Italiano. In the 2006–07 season, he scored 26 goals in 76 matches, including one goal in six matches in the Copa Libertadores. Then, in 2007 he scored 12 in 17 matches for the club, including one goal in four matches in the Copa Sudamericana. Dubbed the "new Maradona" due to his precocious and prolific performances, on 25 January 2008, Di Santo signed for English Premier League side Chelsea on a four-and-a-half-year contract for a fee of £3.4 million.

=== Chelsea ===
==== 2007–08 season ====
Di Santo scored on his debut for Chelsea reserves on 11 February 2008, getting a late goal in a 2–2 draw with Fulham reserves and scored his second goal in as many appearances, against Reading reserves on 3 March. On 14 April, he scored his first hat-trick for Chelsea's reserve team against Tottenham Reserves; the most spectacular of the three goals being a volley from a Branislav Ivanović cross that found the top right corner. In the last reserve match of the season, Di Santo scored his seventh goal in eight reserve games against Aston Villa. He finished the 2007–08 reserve season with 12 reserve goals in eight games.

==== 2008–09 season ====
Di Santo trained with the first team in 2008–09 pre-season and flew out with the squad on their tour of China. Ahead of their first game on tour, he was handed the number 36 jersey and came off the bench in that game against Guangzhou Pharmaceutical, to score the third goal during a 4–0 victory. He scored his second goal of the pre-season campaign in the 65th minute against the Chengdu Blades in a 7–0 victory after he had replaced Nicolas Anelka five minutes before.

On 31 August, Di Santo made his first-team debut in the 1–1 home draw with Tottenham Hotspur, coming on in place of Nicolas Anelka in the 88th minute of the game. His UEFA Champions League debut came against CFR Cluj, replacing Florent Malouda in the 70th minute of a 0–0 draw on 2 October. On 3 January 2009, Di Santo made his FA Cup debut in the third round, replacing Joe Cole for the last six minutes against Southend United in a 1–1 draw at Stamford Bridge.

Di Santo came on as a substitute for Florent Malouda with half an hour remaining and Chelsea a goal down against Stoke City on 17 January 2009. He assisted a goal in the 88th minute for Juliano Belletti to make it 1–1, and Frank Lampard then scored a 94th-minute winner. On 30 May, Di Santo was an unused substitute as Chelsea won the 2009 FA Cup Final against Everton. He made 8 substitute appearances during Chelsea's 2008–09 Premier League campaign and was afterwards linked with a loan move to Blackburn Rovers.

Di Santo scored his first goal of the 2009 pre-season against Club América; he also provided an assist to teammate Florent Malouda a minute later. Chelsea won the game 2–0 to win the World Football Challenge.

==== Loan to Blackburn Rovers ====
On 3 August 2009, Di Santo joined Blackburn Rovers on loan until February 2010, with the option of extending the loan by six months to June 2010.

He made his debut for Rovers on the opening day of the season, 15 August, replacing Jason Roberts in the 65th minute of a 2–0 home defeat to Manchester City. He made his first start in the next match, away to Sunderland a week later, but was substituted for Nikola Kalinić due to injury after 14 minutes; Blackburn lost 2–1. He recovered from injury after a month, starting a 2–1 home win over Aston Villa on 26 September in which he won David Dunn's winning late penalty after his shot was handled by Richard Dunne. On 18 October he scored the only goal of his loan in a 3–2 home win over local rivals Burnley, also assisting David Dunn with a flick.

As a result of his good performances, Rovers extended his loan deal by a further six months until June 2010. However, after his extended loan, Di Santo saw less time on the pitch due to his poor goals-to-games ratio and was often used more as a late substitute. He was not selected for Rovers' final squad of the 2009–10 season, against Aston Villa.

=== Wigan Athletic ===
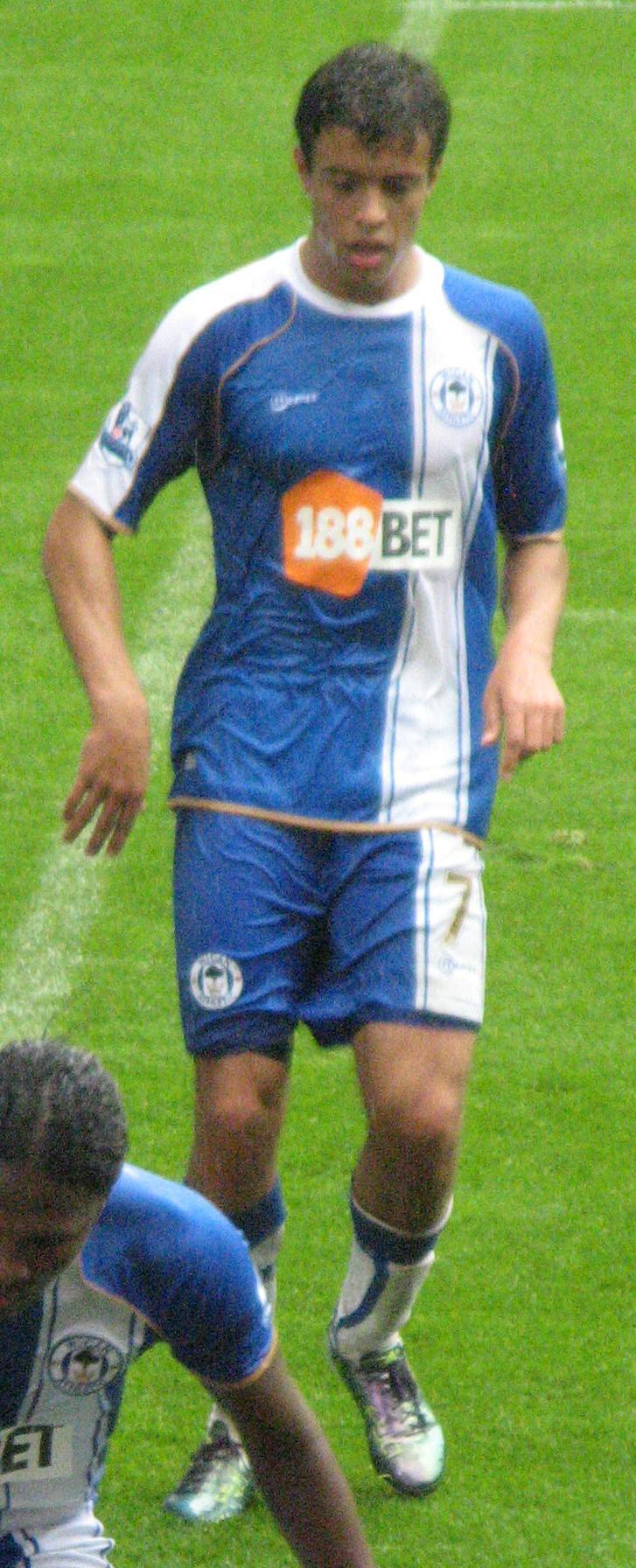
Di Santo playing for Wigan Athletic in 2010

On 31 August 2010, Di Santo signed a three-year contract with Wigan Athletic for a transfer fee of £2 million. He made his debut on 11 September, appearing as a 54th-minute substitute for Hendry Thomas in a 1–1 draw against Sunderland, in support of his compatriot Mauro Boselli. In the following game, against Manchester City, he started for the first time as Wigan lost 2–0 at home. On 23 April 2011, Di Santo replaced Charles N'Zogbia for the last seven minutes of a 4–2 defeat at Sunderland and scored the last goal of the game in added time. It was his first goal since 18 October 2009.

On the opening day of the following Premier League season, Di Santo won a penalty from Ritchie De Laet, which teammate Ben Watson converted in the 1–1 draw against Norwich City. On 27 August 2011, the third game of the season, he scored two deflected goals in a 2–0 win against Queens Park Rangers and left to a standing ovation from the home crowd when substituted for Conor Sammon. On 17 September, he scored again at Goodison Park against Everton, a deflected effort off Tony Hibbert to take the lead, but eventually Wigan lost 3–1.

Di Santo scored his first goal of the 2012–13 season in a 2–0 away win at newly promoted Southampton on 25 August, opening the scoring in the 51st minute with a finish high into the net from inside the area. He was an unused substitute as Wigan defeated Manchester City in the 2013 FA Cup Final, manager Roberto Martínez instead playing Arouna Koné and Callum McManaman in attack. On 30 June 2013, Di Santo was released by Wigan.

=== Werder Bremen ===
On 14 August 2013, Di Santo signed a three-year contract with Bundesliga club Werder Bremen. He made his debut in a 1–0 defeat to Borussia Dortmund nine days later, replacing Marko Arnautović in the 67th minute. On 14 September, he was sent off in a 0–3 home defeat against Eintracht Frankfurt for a tackle which resulted in Bastian Oczipka needing facial stitches. Two months later, in the last five minutes of a home game against Mainz, Di Santo assisted Eljero Elia and then scored his own first Bundesliga goal, but Bremen still lost 2–3. He finished his first season at the club with 4 goals from 23 league appearances.

On 1 November 2014, away to Mainz, Di Santo scored two goals (the first a rebounded penalty), as Bremen came from behind to register their first win of the season after 10 games. This brace put him joint top of the Bundesliga scorers, with 6 goals. He scored another two goals on 1 February 2015 to defeat Hertha Berlin.

=== Schalke 04 ===
On 25 July 2015, Di Santo joined Bremen's rival Schalke 04 signing a four-year contract, after triggering his release clause, believed to be €6 million. Two days later, Di Santo publicly apologized to Bremen fans for the controversial switch, and Bremen director Thomas Eichin said he was "anything but impressed" by the swiftness of Di Santo's departure.

On 8 August, he marked his competitive debut by scoring in a 5–0 win at MSV Duisburg in the first round of the DFB-Pokal. He scored a hat-trick on 1 October, the last of the three being a penalty, in a win by the same score against Asteras Tripolis in the group stage of the UEFA Europa League.

=== Rayo Vallecano ===
On 31 January 2019, Di Santo signed for Rayo Vallecano on a free transfer. He made six appearances for the club in the 2018–19 La Liga season.

=== Atlético Mineiro ===
On 6 August 2019, Di Santo joined Brazilian club Atlético Mineiro. He left the club in June 2020, having made 33 appearances and scored seven goals.

=== San Lorenzo ===
On 10 July 2020, Di Santo completed a move to his homeland with Primera División side San Lorenzo.

=== Independiente Rivadavia ===
In January 2024, he returned to Argentine football from Universidad Católica to sign for Argentine Primera División side Independiente Rivadavia. After arriving from Chile with an injury, he only played 52 minutes for Independiente Rivadavia and his contract was mutually terminated on 15 April.

=== Retirement ===
After about two years as a free agent, Di Santo announced his retirement on 22 May 2026.

== International career ==
Di Santo made his debut for the Argentina under-20 team in 2006 and scored his first goal in a game against the French under-20s. He was part of the under-20 squad that participated in the 2007 South American Youth Championship in Paraguay, which Brazil won by a two-point advantage over Argentina.

He was also called up to the 2009 South American Youth Championship in Venezuela, but was not allowed to take part due to Chelsea's injury crisis. From 2006 to 2009 Di Santo earned 25 Under-20 caps and five goals.

On 31 October 2012, Di Santo was handed a call-up to the Argentina national team squad by manager Alejandro Sabella for their upcoming friendly against Saudi Arabia on 14 November 2012.

In May 2014, Di Santo was re-called to the Argentina national team, in the 30-man provisional squad for the 2014 FIFA World Cup in Brazil. BBC Sport called him a "surprise inclusion". However, later that month, he was one of four players cut from a second provisional 26-man squad.

== Career statistics ==
=== Club ===
As of match played on 12 March 2024.

Appearances and goals by club, season and competition
Club	Season	League			Cup		Other (Note: Includes League Cup and Campeonato Mineiro)		Continental		Total	
Club	Season	League	Apps	Goals	Apps	Goals	Apps	Goals	Apps	Goals	Apps	Goals
Audax Italiano	2006	Chilean Primera División	24	7	0	0	—		—		24	7
Audax Italiano	2007	Chilean Primera División	37	7	0	0	—		10	2	47	9
Audax Italiano	Total		61	14	0	0	—		10	2	71	16
Chelsea	2008–09	Premier League	8	0	3	0	2	0	3	0	16	0
Blackburn Rovers (loan)	2009–10	Premier League	22	1	1	0	1	0	—		24	1
Wigan Athletic	2010–11	Premier League	25	1	2	0	2	0	—		29	1
Wigan Athletic	2011–12	Premier League	32	7	1	0	0	0	—		33	7
Wigan Athletic	2012–13	Premier League	35	5	0	0	0	0	—		35	5
Wigan Athletic	Total		92	14	3	0	2	0	—		97	14
Werder Bremen	2013–14	Bundesliga	23	4	0	0	—		—		23	4
Werder Bremen	2014–15	Bundesliga	26	13	2	1	—		—		28	14
Werder Bremen	Total		49	17	2	1	—		—		51	18
Schalke 04	2015–16	Bundesliga	25	2	2	1	—		7	5	34	8
Schalke 04	2016–17	Bundesliga	12	0	1	0	—		2	0	15	0
Schalke 04	2017–18	Bundesliga	30	3	4	1	—		—		34	4
Schalke 04	2018–19	Bundesliga	4	0	0	0	—		1	0	5	0
Schalke 04	Total		71	5	7	2	—		10	5	88	12
Rayo Vallecano	2018–19	La Liga	6	0	0	0	—		—		6	0
Atlético Mineiro	2019	Brasileiro Série A	21	3	0	0	—		2	1	23	4
Atlético Mineiro	2020	Brasileiro Série A	0	0	2	0	6	3	2	0	10	3
Atlético Mineiro	Total		21	3	2	0	6	3	4	1	33	7
San Lorenzo	2020–21	Argentine Primera División	4	3	6	0	—		2	2	12	5
San Lorenzo	2021	Argentine Primera División	27	10	0	0	—		0	0	27	10
San Lorenzo	Total		31	13	6	0	—		2	2	39	15
Göztepe	2021–22	Süper Lig	15	3	1	0	—		0	0	16	3
Tijuana	2022–23	Liga MX	15	2	0	0	—		0	0	15	2
Universidad Católica	2023	Chilean Primera División	20	2	4	0	—		1	0	25	2
Independiente Rivadavia	2024	Argentine Primera División	1	0	0	0	—		—		1	0
Career total			412	73	29	3	11	3	29	10	482	89

=== International ===
Appearances and goals by national team and year
National team	Year	Apps	Goals
Argentina	2012	1	0
Argentina	2013	2	0
Total		3	0

== Honours ==
Chelsea

- FA Cup: 2008–09

Wigan Athletic

- FA Cup: 2012–13
