= Michael Langer =

Austrian footballer (born 1985)

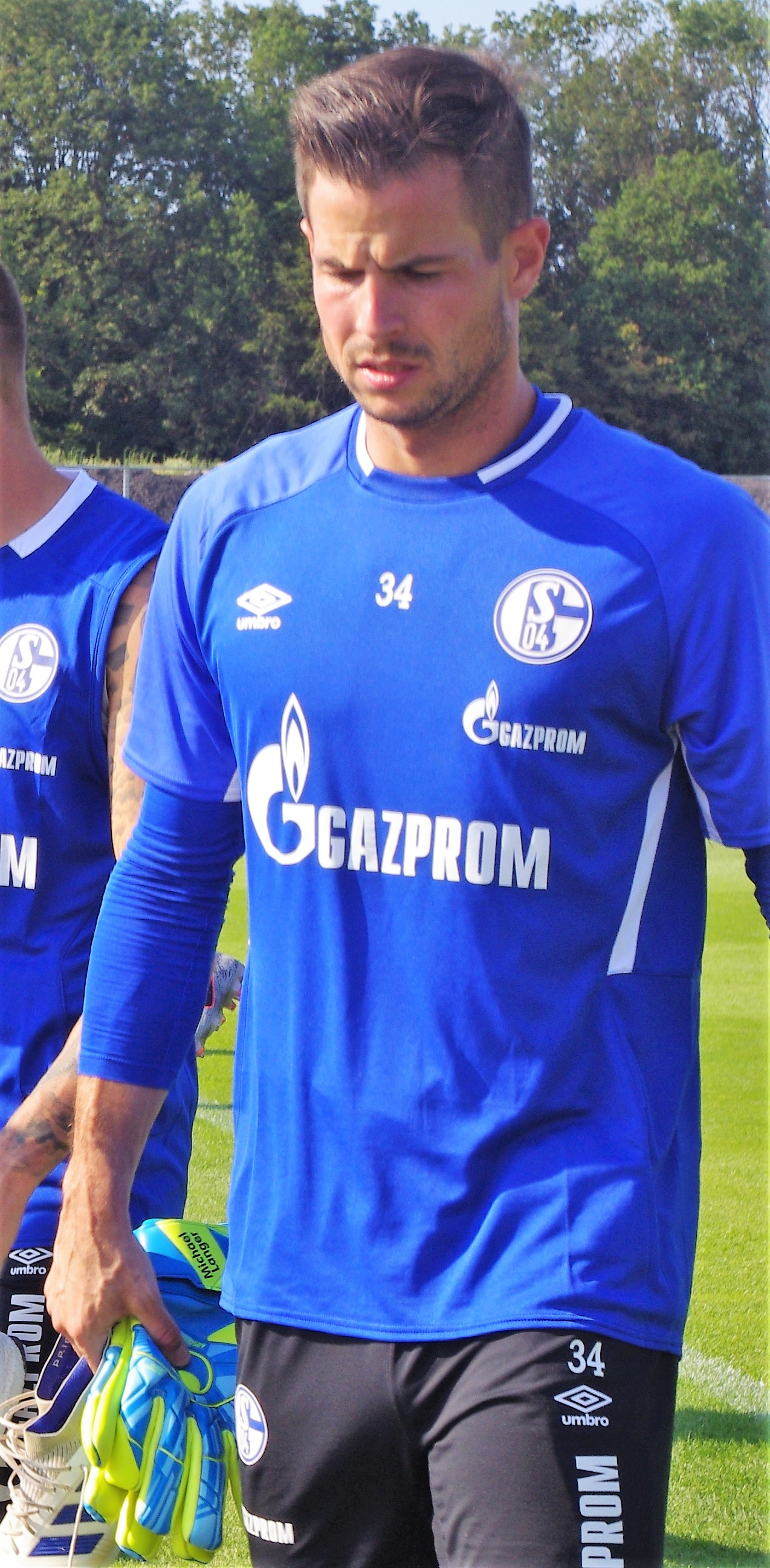
- Langer with Schalke 04 in 2019

Personal information
- Date of birth: 6 January 1985 (age 41)
- Place of birth: Bregenz, Austria
- Height: 1.95 m (6 ft 5 in)
- Position: Goalkeeper

Youth career
- 1994–1997: Schwarz-Weiß Bregenz
- 1997–2002: FC Hard
- 2002–2003: Viktoria Bregenz
- 2003–2004: VfB Stuttgart

Senior career*
| Years | Team | Apps | (Gls) |
| 2004–2007 | VfB Stuttgart II | 28 | (0) |
| 2005–2007 | VfB Stuttgart | 1 | (0) |
| 2008–2010 | SC Freiburg II | 11 | (0) |
| 2008–2010 | SC Freiburg | 14 | (0) |
| 2010–2012 | FSV Frankfurt II | 12 | (0) |
| 2010–2012 | FSV Frankfurt | 5 | (0) |
| 2012–2014 | SV Sandhausen | 8 | (0) |
| 2014–2015 | Vålerenga | 42 | (0) |
| 2016 | Tampa Bay Rowdies | 0 | (0) |
| 2016–2017 | IFK Norrköping | 28 | (0) |
| 2017–2025 | Schalke 04 | 8 | (0) |
| Total | | 157 | (0) |

International career
| 2006 | Austria U21 | 1 | (0) |
- * Club domestic league appearances and goals

Michael Langer (born 6 January 1985) is an Austrian former professional footballer who played as a goalkeeper.

== Club career ==
Formerly a goalkeeper for the German Bundesliga team VfB Stuttgart, he made his debut in the highest German division on 10 March 2007 in a game against Wolfsburg, as a replacement for regular goalkeeper Timo Hildebrand.

On 2 January 2008, he moved to SC Freiburg and the club terminated his contract on 8 May 2010. On 20 May 2010, Langer signed a two-year contract with 2. Bundesliga club FSV Frankfurt. In summer 2012, he moved to SV Sandhausen and signed again a two-year-contract. In April 2014, Langer canceled his contract with Sandhausen and joined Vålerenga IF.

Langer signed with the NASL's Tampa Bay Rowdies on 1 February 2016.

In 2017, Langer joined Schalke 04; 13 years after his first Bundesliga appearance for Stuttgart on 10 March 2007, he made his second, against Bayer Leverkusen on 6 December 2020.

Langer retired from professional football in May 2025.

== International career ==
Langer played once for the Austrian Under-21 national team in 2006.

== Career statistics ==
Appearances and goals by club, season and competition
| Club | Season | League | | | Cup | | Europe | | Other | | Total | |
| Club | Season | Division | Apps | Goals | Apps | Goals | Apps | Goals | Apps | Goals | Apps | Goals |
|---|---|---|---|---|---|---|---|---|---|---|---|---|
| VfB Stuttgart II | 2004–05 | Regionalliga Süd | 5 | 0 | — | | — | | — | | 5 | 0 |
| VfB Stuttgart II | 2005–06 | Regionalliga Süd | 20 | 0 | — | | — | | — | | 20 | 0 |
| VfB Stuttgart II | 2006–07 | Regionalliga Süd | 3 | 0 | — | | — | | — | | 3 | 0 |
| VfB Stuttgart II | Total | | 28 | 0 | — | | — | | — | | 28 | 0 |
| VfB Stuttgart | 2005–06 | Bundesliga | 0 | 0 | 0 | 0 | 0 | 0 | 0 | 0 | 0 | 0 |
| VfB Stuttgart | 2006–07 | Bundesliga | 1 | 0 | 0 | 0 | — | | — | | 1 | 0 |
| VfB Stuttgart | 2007–08 | Bundesliga | 0 | 0 | 0 | 0 | 0 | 0 | 0 | 0 | 0 | 0 |
| VfB Stuttgart | Total | | 1 | 0 | 0 | 0 | 0 | 0 | 0 | 0 | 1 | 0 |
| SC Freiburg II | 2008–09 | Regionalliga Süd | 3 | 0 | — | | — | | — | | 3 | 0 |
| SC Freiburg II | 2009–10 | Regionalliga Süd | 8 | 0 | — | | — | | — | | 8 | 0 |
| SC Freiburg II | Total | | 11 | 0 | — | | — | | — | | 11 | 0 |
| SC Freiburg | 2007–08 | 2. Bundesliga | 13 | 0 | 0 | 0 | — | | — | | 13 | 0 |
| SC Freiburg | 2008–09 | 2. Bundesliga | 1 | 0 | 1 | 0 | — | | — | | 2 | 0 |
| SC Freiburg | 2009–10 | 2. Bundesliga | 0 | 0 | 0 | 0 | — | | — | | 0 | 0 |
| SC Freiburg | Total | | 14 | 0 | 1 | 0 | — | | — | | 15 | 0 |
| FSV Frankfurt II | 2010–11 | Regionalliga Süd | 6 | 0 | — | | — | | — | | 6 | 0 |
| FSV Frankfurt II | 2011–12 | Regionalliga Süd | 5 | 0 | — | | — | | — | | 5 | 0 |
| FSV Frankfurt II | Total | | 11 | 0 | — | | — | | — | | 11 | 0 |
| FSV Frankfurt | 2010–11 | 2. Bundesliga | 5 | 0 | 0 | 0 | — | | — | | 5 | 0 |
| FSV Frankfurt | 2011–12 | 2. Bundesliga | 0 | 0 | 2 | 0 | — | | — | | 2 | 0 |
| FSV Frankfurt | Total | | 5 | 0 | 2 | 0 | — | | — | | 7 | 0 |
| SV Sandhausen | 2012–13 | 2. Bundesliga | 8 | 0 | 0 | 0 | — | | — | | 8 | 0 |
| SV Sandhausen | 2013–14 | 2. Bundesliga | 0 | 0 | 0 | 0 | — | | — | | 0 | 0 |
| SV Sandhausen | Total | | 8 | 0 | 0 | 0 | — | | — | | 8 | 0 |
| Vålerenga | 2014 | Tippeligaen | 28 | 0 | 3 | 0 | — | | — | | 31 | 0 |
| Vålerenga | 2015 | Tippeligaen | 14 | 0 | 1 | 0 | — | | — | | 15 | 0 |
| Vålerenga | Total | | 42 | 0 | 4 | 0 | — | | — | | 46 | 0 |
| Tampa Bay | 2016 | NASL | 0 | 0 | 0 | 0 | — | | — | | 0 | 0 |
| IFK Norrköping | 2016 | Allsvenskan | 13 | 0 | 0 | 0 | — | | — | | 13 | 0 |
| IFK Norrköping | 2017 | Allsvenskan | 15 | 0 | 6 | 0 | 2 | 0 | — | | 23 | 0 |
| IFK Norrköping | Total | | 28 | 0 | 6 | 0 | 2 | 0 | — | | 36 | 0 |
| Schalke 04 | 2017–18 | Bundesliga | 0 | 0 | 0 | 0 | — | | — | | 0 | 0 |
| Schalke 04 | 2018–19 | Bundesliga | 0 | 0 | 0 | 0 | 0 | 0 | — | | 0 | 0 |
| Schalke 04 | 2019–20 | Bundesliga | 0 | 0 | 0 | 0 | — | | — | | 0 | 0 |
| Schalke 04 | 2020–21 | Bundesliga | 3 | 0 | 0 | 0 | — | | — | | 3 | 0 |
| Schalke 04 | 2021–22 | 2. Bundesliga | 2 | 0 | 0 | 0 | — | | — | | 2 | 0 |
| Schalke 04 | 2022–23 | Bundesliga | 0 | 0 | 0 | 0 | — | | — | | 0 | 0 |
| Schalke 04 | 2023–24 | 2. Bundesliga | 3 | 0 | 0 | 0 | — | | — | | 3 | 0 |
| Schalke 04 | 2024–25 | 2. Bundesliga | 0 | 0 | 0 | 0 | — | | — | | 0 | 0 |
| Schalke 04 | Total | | 8 | 0 | 0 | 0 | — | | — | | 8 | 0 |
| Career total | | | 157 | 0 | 13 | 0 | 2 | 0 | 0 | 0 | 162 | 0 |

== Honours ==
VfB Stuttgart

- Bundesliga: 2006–07

Schalke 04

- 2. Bundesliga: 2021–22
