= Amine Harit =

Morocco international footballer (born 1997)

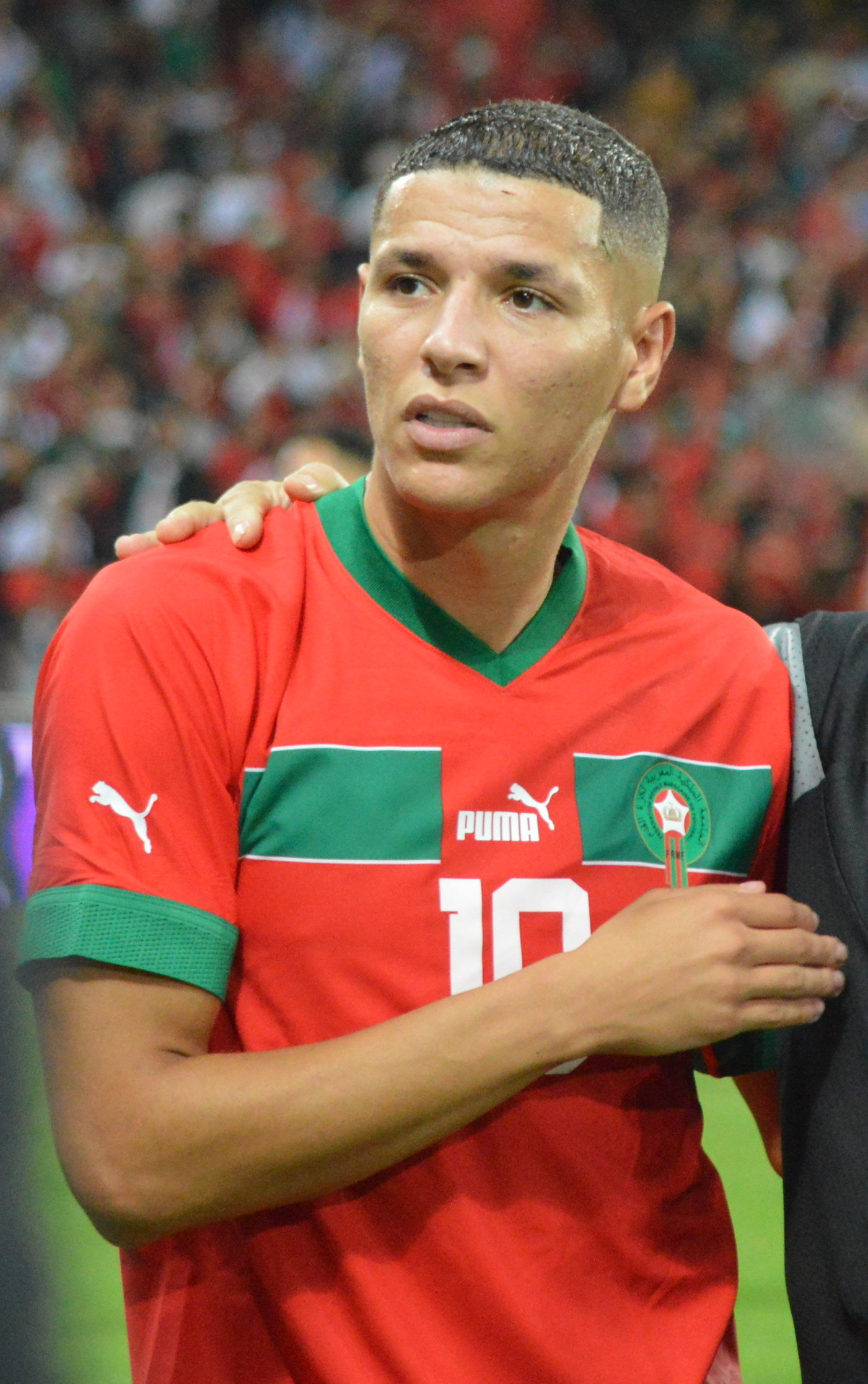
- Harit playing for Morocco in a friendly against Burkina Faso in 2023

Personal information
- Full name: Amine Harit
- Date of birth: 18 June 1997 (age 29)
- Place of birth: Pontoise, France
- Height: 1.80 m (5 ft 11 in)
- Position: Attacking midfielder

Team information
- Current team: Marseille
- Number: 77

Youth career
- 2003–2004: Argenteuil C.O.
- 2004–2007: Espérance Paris 19ème
- 2007–2008: Paris Saint-Germain
- 2008–2011: Espérance Paris 19ème
- 2011–2012: Red Star
- 2012–2016: Nantes

Senior career*
Years	Team	Apps	(Gls)
2015–2016	Nantes B	15	(0)
2016–2017	Nantes	30	(1)
2017–2023	Schalke 04	102	(12)
2021–2023	→ Marseille (loan)	33	(4)
2023–	Marseille	52	(6)
2025–2026	→ İstanbul Başakşehir (loan)	24	(2)

International career^{‡}
2015	France U18	2	(1)
2015–2016	France U19	12	(0)
2016–2017	France U20	9	(1)
2017	France U21	2	(1)
2017–	Morocco	23	(1)
Medal record
Men's Football
Representing France
UEFA European Under-19 Championship
Winner	2016 Germany
- * Club domestic league appearances and goals as of 22 November 2026 ‡ National team caps and goals as of 30 January 2024

Amine Harit (Arabic: أمين حارث; born 18 June 1997) is a professional footballer who plays as an attacking midfielder for Ligue 1 club Marseille. Born in France, he plays for the Morocco national team.

== Early life ==
Born and raised in Pontoise, France to Moroccan parents, Harit acquired French nationality on 27 August 2003, through the collective effect of his parents' naturalization.

== Club career ==
=== Nantes ===
Harit made his debut for the Ligue 1 side on 13 August 2016 against Dijon. He played the whole match in a 1–0 away win.

=== Schalke 04 ===
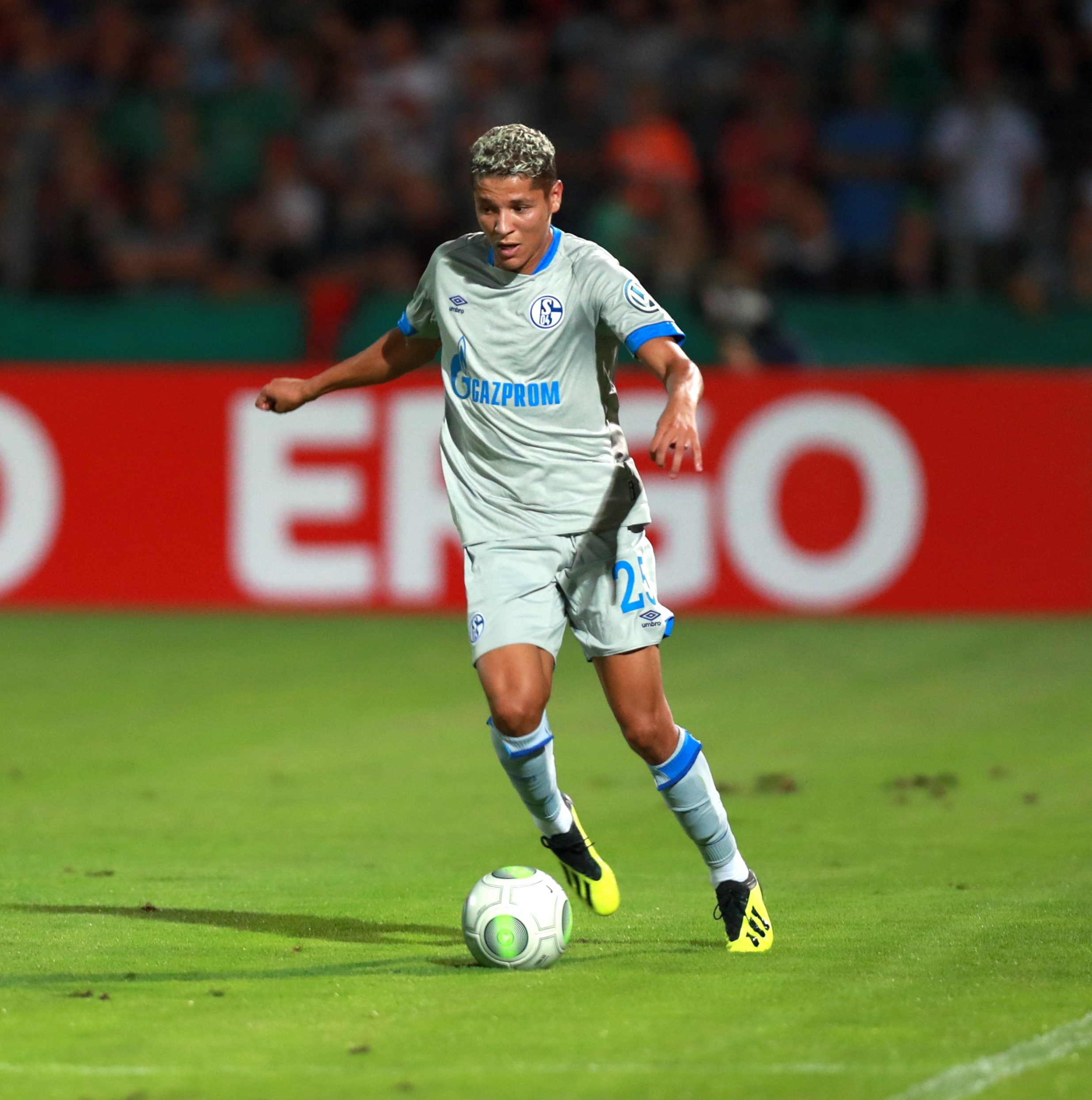
Harit with Schalke 04 in 2018

On 10 July 2017, Schalke 04 announced the signing of Harit on a four-year contract. The transfer fee paid to Nantes was reported as €8 million, which could rise to €10 million with bonuses. He made his debut for the German club on 14 August in a DFB-Pokal against BFC Dynamo. He started the match and came off at halftime of a 2–0 away win.

On 25 November 2017, Harit scored his first ever Bundesliga goal against Ruhr rivals Borussia Dortmund as Schalke overturned a 4–0 deficit to a 4–4 draw in a historic Revierderby match. He was named Bundesliga 'Rookie of the Month' for December 2017, going on to take the 'Bundesliga Rookie of the Year' award for the 2017–18 season.

On 11 December 2019, Harit extended his contract with Schalke for a further three years, until 2024.

=== Marseille ===
On 2 September 2021, it was announced that Harit was loaned out to Ligue 1 club Marseille for the 2021–22 Ligue 1 season. He made his debut for the club in a 2–0 Ligue 1 away win over Monaco, delivering an assist for the second goal. In the following match, against Rennes, Harit came on in the 59th minute and scored 12 minutes later, his first goal with OM. On 20 April 2022, he scored the winning goal in a 3–2 home win over his former club Nantes.

On 1 September 2022, Harit joined Marseille again for a season-long loan, this time with an option to make the move permanent. On 7 November, his transfer to OM was made permanent for a fee in the region of €5 million. After having made his 15th appearance of the season, an obligation-to-buy clause in his contract was triggered.

==== Loan to Başakşehir ====
On 12 September 2025, Harit joined Süper Lig club Başakşehir on a loan.

== International career ==
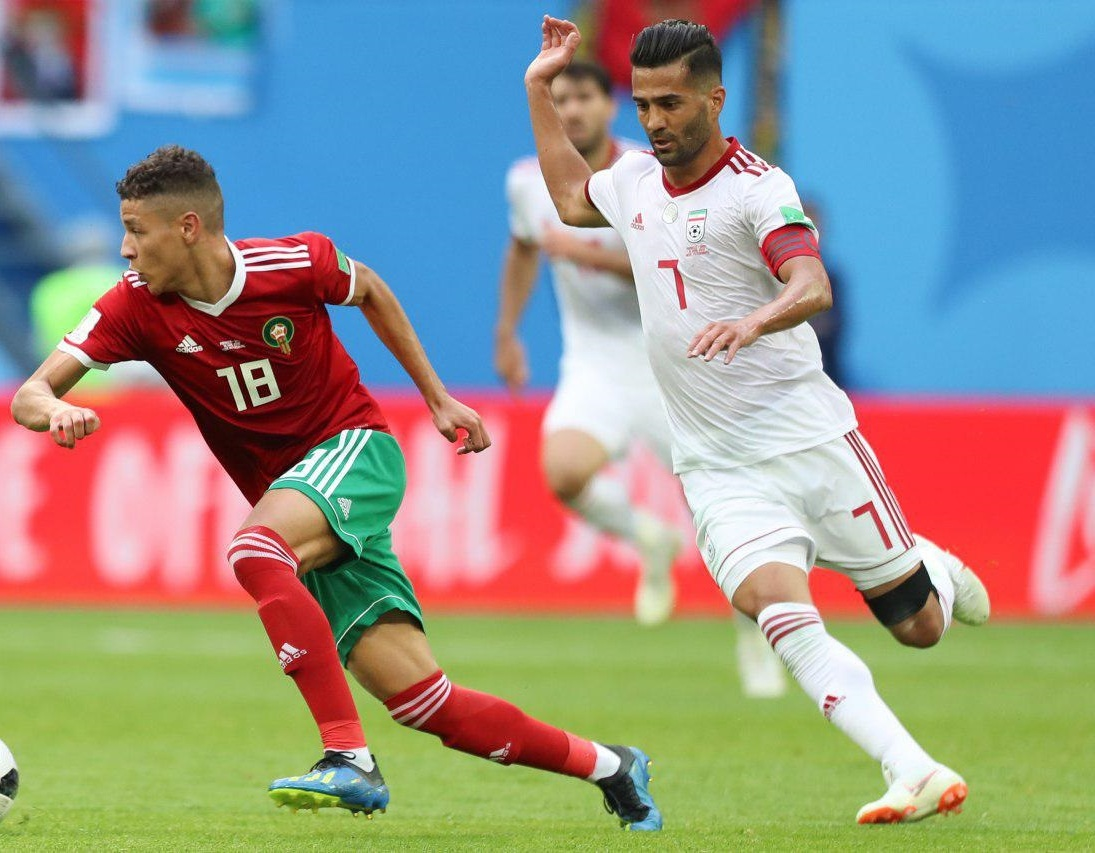
Amine Harit dribbles past Masoud Shojaei in a group stage match against Iran at the 2018 World Cup.

Harit played for the France national youth teams starting from the France U18s until the France U21s. He is Moroccan by descent, and refused a call up to the Morocco U19s in October 2015. He even went to play for France again. However, on 12 September 2017, Harit decided to switch his allegiance to the Morocco national team.

On 7 October 2017, Harit made his international debut for Morocco in a 2018 FIFA World Cup qualification match against Gabon at the Stade Mohammed V in Casablanca, replacing Nordin Amrabat in the 90th minute of the 3–0 victory.

In May 2018, he was named in Morocco's 23-man squad for the 2018 FIFA World Cup in Russia.

On 10 November 2022, he was named in Morocco's 26-man squad for the 2022 FIFA World Cup in Qatar. On 13 November, he sustained a knee injury which ruled him out of the World Cup.

On 17 October 2023, Harit scored his first goal for the national team in a 3–0 victory against Liberia.

== Personal life ==
In June 2018, Harit was behind the wheel in a fatal road traffic accident in Marrakesh which resulted in the death of a 28 year old pedestrian. Less than three weeks after the accident, Harit returned to training with Schalke. The Moroccan international was later sentenced to a four-month suspended sentence and a fine of approximately 8,600 dirhams (Euros 780).

On March 20, 2020, during the early stages of COVID-19, Harit visited a shisha bar while disregarding the club's isolation mandate. It was later reported that Harit was fined 100,000 euros by Schalke.

== Career statistics ==
=== Club ===
As of match played 8 November 2026

Appearances and goals by club, season and competition
Club	Season	League			National cup (Note: Includes Coupe de France, DFB-Pokal)		League cup (Note: Includes Coupe de la Ligue)		Europe		Total	
Club	Season	Division	Apps	Goals	Apps	Goals	Apps	Goals	Apps	Goals	Apps	Goals
Nantes B	2015–16	CFA 2	15	0	—		—		—		15	0
Nantes	2016–17	Ligue 1	30	1	1	0	3	0	—		34	1
Schalke 04	2017–18	Bundesliga	31	3	4	0	—		—		35	3
Schalke 04	2018–19	Bundesliga	18	1	2	0	—		5 (Note: Appearances in UEFA Champions League)	0	25	1
Schalke 04	2019–20	Bundesliga	25	6	3	1	—		—		28	7
Schalke 04	2020–21	Bundesliga	28	2	3	0	—		—		31	2
Schalke 04	Total		102	12	12	1	—		5	0	119	13
Marseille (loan)	2021–22	Ligue 1	23	4	2	1	—		9 (Note: Three appearances in UEFA Europa League, six appearances in UEFA Europa Conference League)	0	34	5
Marseille (loan)	2022–23	Ligue 1	10	0	0	0	—		6	1	16	1
Marseille	2023–24	Ligue 1	28	1	0	0	—		16 (Note: Two appearances in UEFA Champions League, fourteen appearances and one goal in UEFA Europa League)	1	44	2
Marseille	2024–25	Ligue 1	13	2	0	0	—		—		13	2
Marseille	2026–27	Ligue 1	10	3	0	0	—		2 (Note: Appearance in UEFA Europa League)	0	12	3
Marseille	Marseille total		84	10	2	1	—		33	2	119	13
İstanbul Başakşehir (loan)	2025–26	Süper Lig	24	2	2	0	—		—		26	2
Career total			255	25	17	2	3	0	38	2	313	29

=== International ===
As of match played 30 January 2024

Appearances and goals by national team and year
National team	Year	Apps	Goals
Morocco	2017	2	0
Morocco	2018	5	0
Morocco	2019	3	0
Morocco	2020	1	0
Morocco	2021	0	0
Morocco	2022	5	0
Morocco	2023	4	1
Morocco	2024	4	0
Total		24	1

Scores and results list Morocco's goal tally first.

List of international goals scored by Amine Harit
No.	Date	Venue	Opponent	Score	Result	Competition
1	17 October 2023	Adrar Stadium, Agadir, Morocco	Liberia	1–0	3–0	2023 Africa Cup of Nations qualification

== Honours ==
France U19

- UEFA European Under-19 Championship: 2016

Individual

- UEFA European Under-19 Championship Team of the Tournament: 2016
- Bundesliga Rookie of the Year: 2017–18
- Mars d'Or (Moroccan Youth Player of the Year): 2018
- Bundesliga Player of the Month: September 2019
- UEFA Europa League top assist provider: 2023–24
