= Abdul Rahman Baba =

Ghanaian footballer

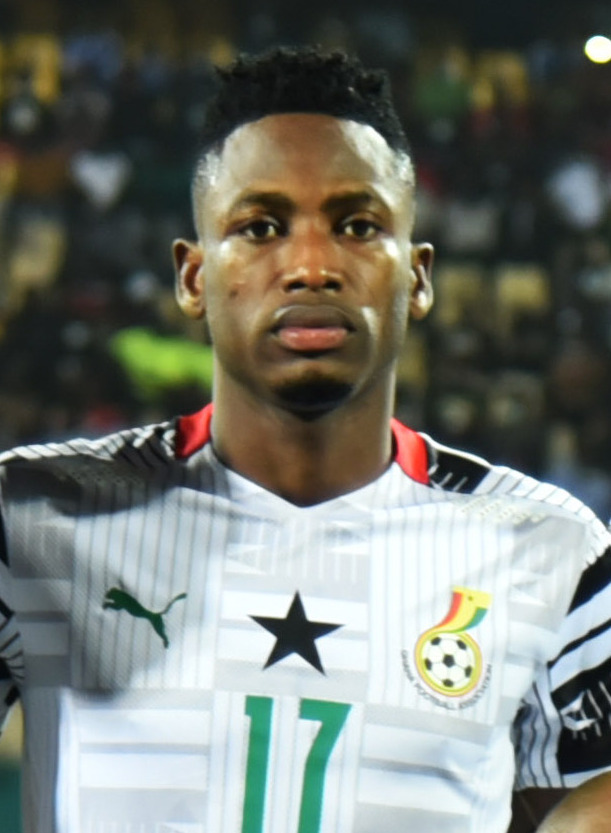
- Baba with Ghana in 2022

Personal information
- Full name: Abdul Rahman Baba
- Date of birth: 2 July 1994 (age 32)
- Place of birth: Tamale, Ghana
- Height: 1.80 m (5 ft 11 in)
- Position: Left-back

Team information
- Current team: PAOK
- Number: 21

Youth career
- 2004–2010: Young Meteors Tamale
- 2010–2011: Dreams FC

Senior career*
Years	Team	Apps	(Gls)
2011–2012	→ Asante Kotoko (loan)	25	(0)
2012–2014	Greuther Fürth	44	(2)
2014–2015	FC Augsburg	31	(0)
2015–2023	Chelsea	15	(0)
2016–2017	→ Schalke 04 (loan)	13	(0)
2018–2019	→ Schalke 04 (loan)	3	(0)
2019	→ Reims (loan)	11	(1)
2019–2020	→ Mallorca (loan)	2	(0)
2021	→ PAOK (loan)	13	(1)
2021–2022	→ Reading (loan)	29	(0)
2022–2023	→ Reading (loan)	18	(0)
2023–	PAOK	86	(12)

International career^{‡}
2013	Ghana U20	7	(0)
2014–	Ghana	54	(1)
Medal record
Representing Ghana
Men's football
Africa Cup of Nations
Runner-up	2015 Equatorial Guinea
- * Club domestic league appearances and goals as of 20 September 2026 ‡ National team caps and goals as of 23 June 2026

Abdul Rahman Baba (born 2 July 1994), also known as Baba Rahman, is a Ghanaian professional footballer who plays as a left-back for Super League Greece club PAOK and the Ghana national team.

Beginning his career at Dreams FC, he played in the Ghanaian Premier League with Asante Kotoko. In 2012, he signed for Bundesliga club Greuther Fürth, where he spent two seasons. He then played for FC Augsburg before joining Chelsea in 2015 for a fee of £14 million, potentially rising to £22 million.

Baba made his international debut in 2014 and was part of their squad which were runners-up at the 2015 Africa Cup of Nations.

== Early life ==
Abdul Rahman Baba was born on 2 July 1994, in Tamale in the Northern Region of Ghana to Alhaji Baba (Zobognaa) and Hajia Fati Baba Sibdoo. He attended Our Lady Of Fatima JHS and Young Dakpem'yili JHS, all in Tamale. He made his footballing debut with his local team Young Meteors Tamale playing for them from 2004 to 2010, before being scouted by Dreams FC, an Accra based club at the age of 16.

== Club career ==
=== Ghana ===
Baba began his career at Dreams FC of the Ghana Division Two. After impressive performances, he was then transferred on loan to Asante Kotoko of the Ghanaian Premier League for one season.

For the 2012 season, Baba was a finalist for the league's Discovery of the Year Award, eventually losing to Joshua Oninku. After becoming a sought after player during his time with the Kumasi-based club, serious enquiries were made about the player by Manchester City and Arsenal of the Premier League and Parma of Serie A.

=== Germany ===
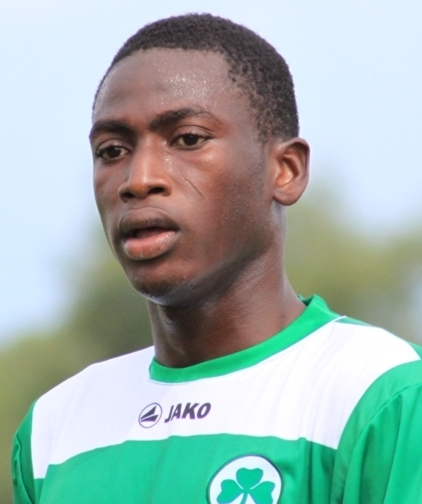
Baba with Greuther Fürth in 2012

However, Baba eventually signed with newly promoted Greuther Fürth in the Bundesliga on 12 June 2012. Baba stated that his decision to join Fürth was because the club offered, "the best conditions to further develop my career." In the derby against 1. FC Nürnberg on 11 August 2014 he scored his first two goals for Fürth in a 5–1 home victory. The next day he signed with FC Augsburg of the same division.

In Baba's 2014–15 season with Augsburg, he made 108 tackles, more than any other player in the Bundesliga that season. Using aspects of his strength and pace, he was able to win 90 of those tackles, coming out to an 83% successful tackle rate. That season, Baba also had 83 interceptions and won 80 contested aerial balls.

=== Chelsea ===
==== 2015–16 season ====
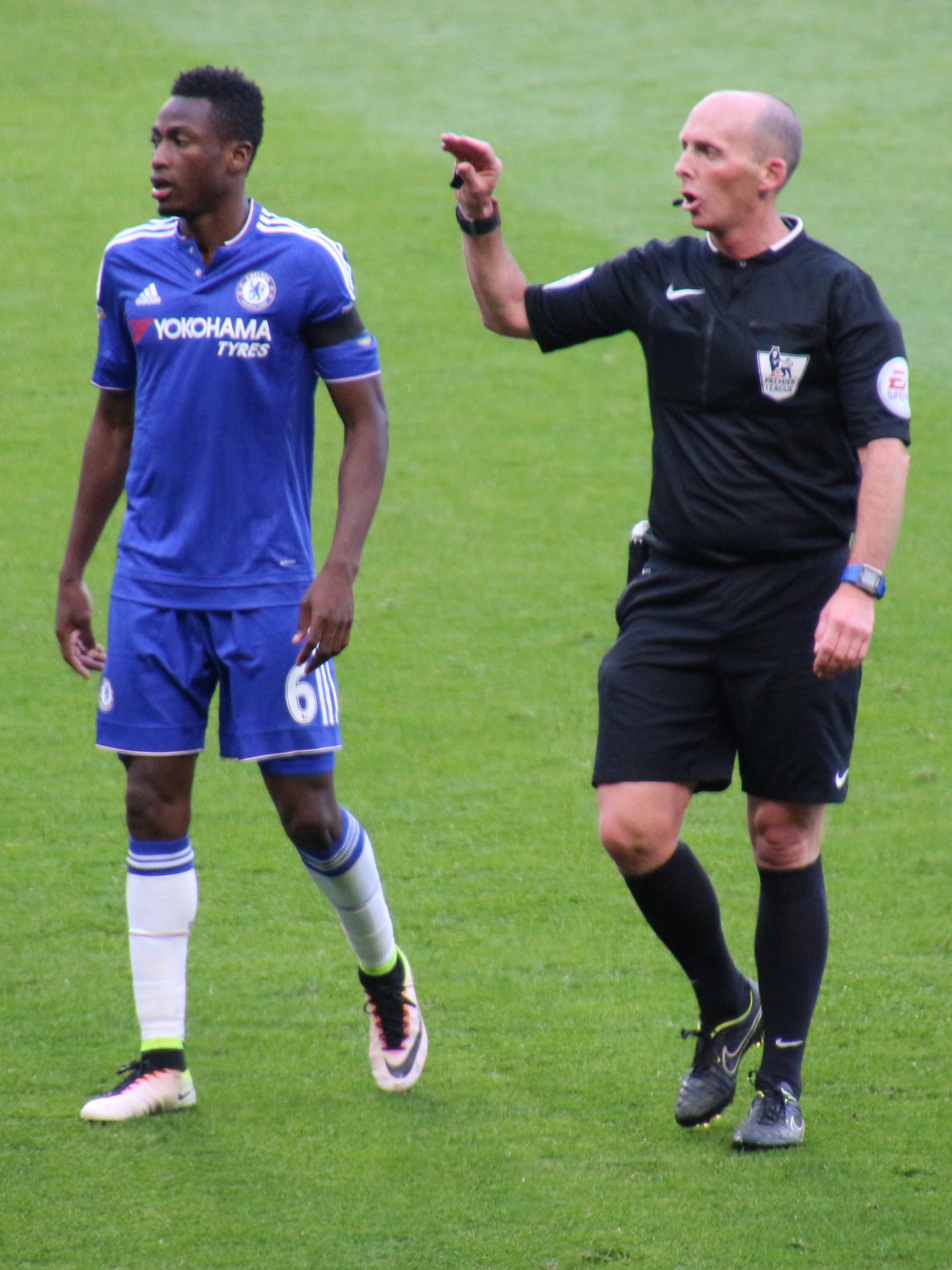
Baba playing for Chelsea in 2016

On 16 August 2015, Baba signed for Chelsea on a five-year deal for an undisclosed fee, reported to be an initial £14 million, rising to a potential fee of almost £22 million. He made his debut on 16 September in a UEFA Champions League tie, playing the full 90 minutes in a 4–0 win at home to Maccabi Tel Aviv. He made his Premier League debut in a 2–0 win over Aston Villa at Stamford Bridge on 17 October. He played at left-back in games including their 2–1 Champions League win over Dynamo Kyiv.

On 27 February, Baba made an error which allowed Southampton's Shane Long to score in the 42nd minute; he was substituted for Kenedy at half time but Chelsea eventually won 2–1 at St. Mary's.

==== Schalke 04 (loan) ====
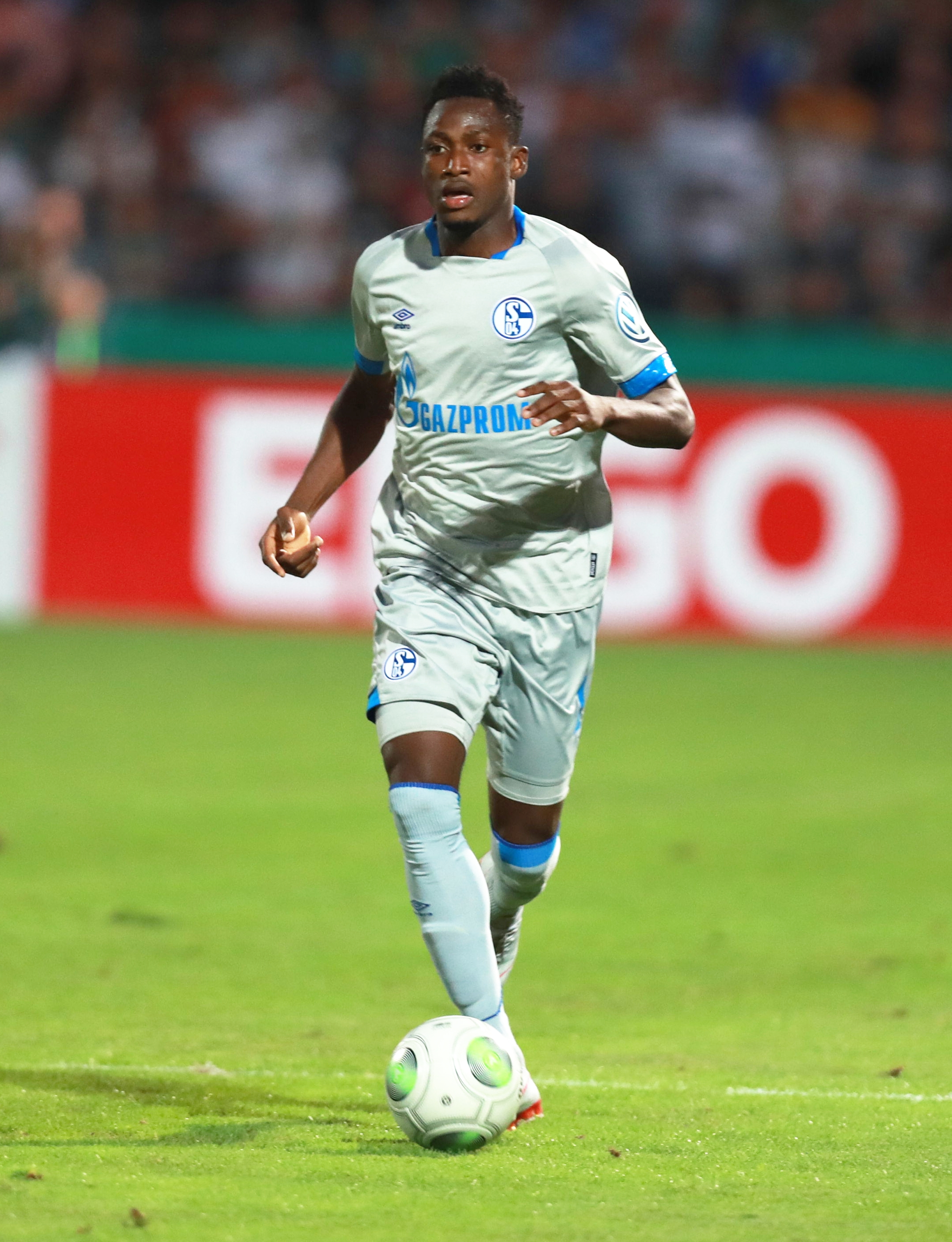
Baba playing for Schalke 04 in 2018

On 2 August 2016, FC Schalke 04, confirmed that Baba had moved on a season-long loan to the club after failing to impress the new Chelsea manager Antonio Conte during pre-season. Baba was given the number 14 jersey for the upcoming season. He was signed by his former Augsburg manager, Markus Weinzierl. Baba told the local newspaper Ruhr Nachrichten that Conte advised him to leave on loan because he preferred more defensive players than him.

Baba made his competitive debut for the Gelsenkirchen team on 20 August, as a winger instead of a defender in a 4–1 victory against FC 08 Villingen in the first round of the DFB-Pokal. He made his league debut on 27 August, coming on for Sead Kolašinac in the 62nd minute of an eventual 1–0 loss at Eintracht Frankfurt on the first day of the season. Baba scored his first goal for Schalke on 15 September, the game's only in a Europa League victory at OGC Nice.

In January 2018, Baba joined Schalke 04 on loan for a second time agreeing an 18-month stay until summer 2019.

==== Reims (loan) ====
In January 2019, he returned early to Chelsea and was immediately loaned to Stade de Reims until the end of the season.

==== Mallorca (loan) ====
On 2 September 2019, the last day of transfer window, Baba was again loaned out in a season-long deal, this time to newly promoted La Liga side Mallorca.

==== PAOK (loan) ====
On 30 January 2021, Baba was loaned out to PAOK for the remainder of the 2020–21 season. He made his debut for the Greek side against Lamia on 20 February scoring the first goal in a 4–0 victory to send his side second in the league table.

==== Reading (loan) ====
On 27 August 2021, Baba joined Reading on loan. He made his debut for the club against Queens Park Rangers on 10 September. On 31 August 2022, Baba rejoined Reading on another season-long-loan.

=== PAOK ===
On 10 July 2023, Baba left Chelsea after eight years and seven loan duties at other clubs. He signed a two-year contract with a one-year extension option to Super League Greece club PAOK. On 6 August 2024, Baba scored for PAOK on the 75th minute to clinch a 2–2 draw against Malmö in the UEFA Champions League qualifying round.

== International career ==
Rahman received his first call-up to the Ghana senior national team in March 2013, when coach Kwesi Appiah named him in the Black Stars squad for a 2014 FIFA World Cup qualifier against Sudan.

Baba played every minute of Ghana's campaign at the 2015 Africa Cup of Nations in Equatorial Guinea, providing the cross from which André Ayew headed in the winner against South Africa to win Group C. In the final against the Ivory Coast, Baba scored in the penalty shootout in which his team lost 9–8.

Baba was selected for Ghana's final squad at the 2022 FIFA World Cup, and provided an assist during his side's opening match against Portugal; he produced the cross which was headed into goal by Osman Bukari.

On 2 June 2026, Baba was named in head coach Carlos Queiroz's 26-man squad for the 2026 FIFA World Cup.

== Personal life ==
Abdul Rahman Baba has "Baba" on the back of his jersey for his Chelsea-supporting father. In May 2016, Baba married his longtime childhood girlfriend, Salma, in their hometown of Tamale in northern Ghana. Baba started doing philanthropic work in his hometown, Tamale whilst playing in Europe. In 2021, he donated football materials and equipment to his former school and to the Tamale Juvenile Unit to help upcoming sportsmen within the northern part of Ghana.

== Career statistics ==
=== Club ===
As of match played 13 April 2025

Appearances and goals by club, season and competition
Club	Season	League			National cup (Note: Includes DFB Pokal, FA Cup, Coupe de France, Greek Cup)		League cup (Note: Includes EFL Cup, Coupe de la Ligue)		Continental		Other		Total	
Club	Season	Division	Apps	Goals	Apps	Goals	Apps	Goals	Apps	Goals	Apps	Goals	Apps	Goals
Greuther Fürth	2012–13	Bundesliga	20	0	1	0	—		—		—		21	0
Greuther Fürth	2013–14	2. Bundesliga	22	0	1	0	—		—		2 (Note: Appearances in Bundesliga Promotion/Relegation play-offs)	0	25	0
Greuther Fürth	2014–15	2. Bundesliga	2	2	0	0	—		—		—		2	2
Greuther Fürth	Total		44	2	2	0	—		—		2	0	48	2
Augsburg	2014–15	Bundesliga	31	0	0	0	—		—		—		31	0
Augsburg	2015–16	Bundesliga	0	0	1	0	—		0	0	—		1	0
Augsburg	Total		31	0	1	0	—		0	0	—		32	0
Chelsea	2015–16	Premier League	15	0	2	0	2	0	4 (Note: Appearance(s) in UEFA Champions League)	0	0	0	23	0
Chelsea	2016–17	Premier League	0	0	0	0	0	0	—		—		0	0
Chelsea	2017–18	Premier League	0	0	0	0	0	0	0	0	0	0	0	0
Chelsea	2018–19	Premier League	0	0	0	0	0	0	0	0	0	0	0	0
Chelsea	2019–20	Premier League	0	0	0	0	0	0	0	0	0	0	0	0
Chelsea	2020–21	Premier League	0	0	0	0	0	0	0	0	—		0	0
Chelsea	2021–22	Premier League	0	0	0	0	0	0	0	0	0	0	0	0
Chelsea	2022–23	Premier League	0	0	0	0	0	0	0	0	—		0	0
Chelsea	Total		15	0	2	0	2	0	4	0	0	0	23	0
Schalke 04 (loan)	2016–17	Bundesliga	13	0	2	0	—		6 (Note: Appearances in UEFA Europa League)	1	—		21	1
Schalke 04 (loan)	2017–18	Bundesliga	1	0	0	0	—		—		—		1	0
Schalke 04 (loan)	2018–19	Bundesliga	2	0	1	0	—		1	0	—		4	0
Schalke 04 (loan)	Total		3	0	1	0	—		1	0	—		5	0
Reims (loan)	2018–19	Ligue 1	11	1	0	0	0	0	—		—		11	1
Mallorca (loan)	2019–20	La Liga	2	0	3	0	—		—		—		5	0
PAOK (loan)	2020–21	Super League Greece	13	1	4	0	—		0	0	—		17	1
Reading (loan)	2021–22	Championship	29	0	0	0	0	0	—		—		29	0
Reading (loan)	2022–23	Championship	18	0	2	0	0	0	—		—		20	0
PAOK	2023–24	Super League Greece	28	6	2	0	—		14 (Note: Appearances in UEFA Europa Conference League)	1	—		44	7
PAOK	2024–25	Super League Greece	26	5	1	0	—		16 (Note: Four appearances and one goal in UEFA Champions League, twelve appearances and two goals in UEFA Europa League)	3	—		43	8
PAOK	Total		54	11	3	0	—		30	4	—		87	15
Career total			233	15	20	0	2	0	41	5	2	0	298	20

=== International ===
As of match played 23 June 2026

Appearances and goals by national team and year
National team	Year	Apps	Goals
Ghana	2014	5	0
Ghana	2015	12	0
Ghana	2016	8	0
Ghana	2017	1	0
Ghana	2018	0	0
Ghana	2019	5	0
Ghana	2020	2	0
Ghana	2021	8	1
Ghana	2022	10	0
Ghana	2023	1	0
Ghana	2024	0	0
Ghana	2025	0	0
Ghana	2026	2	0
Total		54	1

Scores and results list Ghana's goal tally first, score column indicates score after each Baba goal.

List of international goals scored by Abdul Rahman Baba
No.	Date	Venue	Opponent	Score	Result	Competition	Ref.
1	28 March 2021	Cape Coast Sports Stadium, Cape Coast, Ghana	São Tomé and Príncipe	3–0	3–1	2021 Africa Cup of Nations qualification	

== Honours ==
Asante Kotoko

- Ghana Premier League: 2011–12

PAOK

- Super League Greece: 2023–24
- Greek Cup: 2020–21

Ghana

- Africa Cup of Nations runner-up: 2015

Individual

- Super League Greece Team of the Season: 2023–24
