= Bastian Oczipka =

German footballer

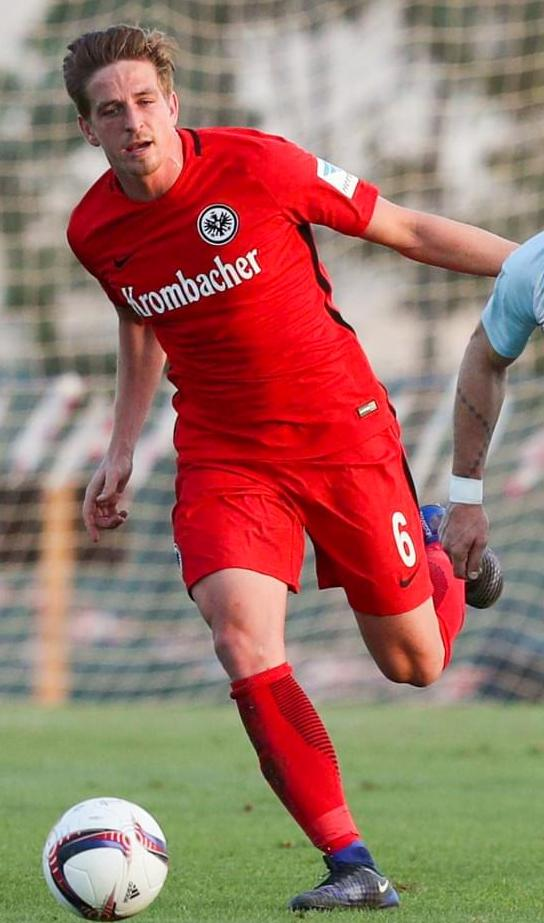
- Oczipka playing for Eintracht Frankfurt in 2017

Personal information
- Date of birth: 12 January 1989 (age 37)
- Place of birth: Bergisch Gladbach, West Germany
- Height: 1.84 m (6 ft 0 in)
- Position: Left back

Youth career
- 1994–1997: SV Blau-Weiß Hand
- 1997–1999: SSG Bergisch Gladbach
- 1999–2008: Bayer Leverkusen

Senior career*
Years	Team	Apps	(Gls)
2008–2012	Bayer Leverkusen II	4	(0)
2008–2012	Bayer Leverkusen	9	(0)
2008	→ Hansa Rostock II (loan)	1	(0)
2008–2009	→ Hansa Rostock (loan)	42	(0)
2010–2011	→ FC St. Pauli (loan)	36	(1)
2012–2017	Eintracht Frankfurt	146	(2)
2017–2021	Schalke 04	111	(1)
2021–2022	Union Berlin	18	(0)
2022–2023	Arminia Bielefeld	30	(1)
Total		397	(5)

International career
2008	Germany U19	2	(0)
2008–2009	Germany U20	5	(0)
- * Club domestic league appearances and goals

Bastian Oczipka (born 12 January 1989) is a former German professional footballer who played as a left back.

== Career ==
Oczipka began his career 1994 with SV Blau-Weiß Hand. After three years, he joined SSG Bergisch Gladbach in summer 1997. He played two years in the youth teams of SSG Bergisch Gladbach before he was scouted by Bayer Leverkusen in July 1999. In 2008, Leverkusen loaned him to F.C. Hansa Rostock. After two and a half years, he left Rostock to return to Bayer 04 Leverkusen, but the Werksclub loaned him again, this time to FC St. Pauli on 5 January 2010.

Although FC St. Pauli showed interest in a continued commitment beyond the loan period, Oczipka returned to Leverkusen in the summer of 2011. However, he came for Bayer in the 2011/12 season only to nine Bundesliga and three Champions League appearances.

In the summer break 2012 Oczipka joined the Bundesliga rookie Eintracht Frankfurt with a three-year contract, starting from the 2012–13 Bundesliga season for an undisclosed transfer fee. In his first season for the Hesse team, he played 33 games in which he set up nine assists, and qualified with his team for the UEFA Europa League. In March 2015, Oczipka extended his contract with Eintracht Frankfurt for another three years until 30 June 2018. On 9 May 2015, Oczipka scored his first Bundesliga goal for a 1-0 lead in a 3-1 victory at home against TSG 1899 Hoffenheim.

On 15 July 2017, his move to FC Schalke 04 was announced. For the Royal Blues he received a contract until 30 July 2020 and the squad number 24. His debut was on 19 August 2017 (1st matchday) in a 2-0 home win against RB Leipzig.

On 30 August 2021, Oczipka agreed to join Union Berlin.

After his contract with Union terminated in June 2022, he signed with Arminia Bielefeld.

On 14 August 2023, Oczipka announced his retirement from professional football.

== International career ==
Oczipka was a youth international footballer. He would have been eligible for the Poland national football team through his grandparents, who were from Upper Silesia.

== Career statistics ==
Appearances and goals by club, season and competition
Club	Season	League			Cup		Europe		Other		Total	
Club	Season	League	Apps	Goals	Apps	Goals	Apps	Goals	Apps	Goals	Apps	Goals
Bayer Leverkusen II	2008–09	Regionalliga West	2	0	—		—		—		2	0
Bayer Leverkusen II	2011–12	Regionalliga West	2	0	—		—		—		2	0
Bayer Leverkusen II	Total		4	0	—		—		—		4	0
Hansa Rostock II (loan)	2008–09	Regionalliga Nord	1	0	—		—		—		1	0
Hansa Rostock (loan)	2008–09	2. Bundesliga	29	0	2	0	—		—		31	0
Hansa Rostock (loan)	2009–10	2. Bundesliga	13	0	1	0	—		—		14	0
Hansa Rostock (loan)	Total		42	0	3	0	—		—		45	0
FC St. Pauli (loan)	2009–10	2. Bundesliga	16	1	0	0	—		—		16	1
FC St. Pauli (loan)	2010–11	Bundesliga	20	0	1	0	—		—		21	0
FC St. Pauli (loan)	Total		36	1	1	0	—		—		37	1
Bayer Leverkusen	2011–12	Bundesliga	9	0	0	0	3	0	—		12	0
Eintracht Frankfurt	2012–13	Bundesliga	33	0	1	0	—		—		34	0
Eintracht Frankfurt	2013–14	Bundesliga	20	0	2	0	8	0	—		30	0
Eintracht Frankfurt	2014–15	Bundesliga	30	1	1	0	—		—		31	1
Eintracht Frankfurt	2015–16	Bundesliga	30	0	2	0	—		2 (Note: Appearances in Bundesliga relegation play-offs)	0	34	0
Eintracht Frankfurt	2016–17	Bundesliga	33	1	5	0	—		—		38	1
Eintracht Frankfurt	Total		146	2	11	0	8	0	2	0	167	2
Schalke 04	2017–18	Bundesliga	29	0	4	0	—		—		33	0
Schalke 04	2018–19	Bundesliga	21	1	2	0	2	0	—		25	1
Schalke 04	2019–20	Bundesliga	34	0	4	0	—		—		38	0
Schalke 04	2020–21	Bundesliga	27	0	3	0	—		—		30	0
Schalke 04	Total		111	1	13	0	2	0	—		126	1
Union Berlin	2021–22	Bundesliga	18	0	3	0	0	0	—		21	0
Arminia Bielefeld	2022–23	2. Bundesliga	30	1	1	0	—		1 (Note: Appearance in 2. Bundesliga relegation play-offs)	0	32	1
Career total			397	5	32	0	13	0	3	0	445	5

== Honours ==
Bayer Leverkusen

- DFB-Pokal der Junioren: 2007–08

Eintracht Frankfurt

- DFB-Pokal: runner-up 2016–17
