= Luke Hemmerich =

German footballer (born 1998)

Personal information
- Date of birth: 9 February 1998 (age 28)
- Place of birth: Essen, Germany
- Height: 1.78 m (5 ft 10 in)
- Position: Left-back

Team information
- Current team: Würzburger Kickers
- Number: 21

Youth career
- –2005: Sportfreunde Niederwenigern
- 2005–2012: Bayer Leverkusen
- 2012–2013: Rot-Weiss Essen
- 2014–2017: Schalke 04

Senior career*
| Years | Team | Apps | (Gls) |
| 2017–2018 | Schalke 04 | 0 | (0) |
| 2017–2018 | → VfL Bochum (loan) | 7 | (0) |
| 2018–2019 | Erzgebirge Aue | 2 | (0) |
| 2019 | → Energie Cottbus (loan) | 17 | (0) |
| 2019–2021 | Würzburger Kickers | 35 | (3) |
| 2021–2022 | Preußen Münster | 26 | (5) |
| 2022–2023 | SpVgg Bayreuth | 28 | (1) |
| 2023–2024 | Würzburger Kickers | 15 | (0) |
| 2024–2025 | TSV Aubstadt | 33 | (3) |
| 2025– | Würzburger Kickers | 27 | (2) |

International career
| 2016 | Germany U18 | 1 | (0) |
| 2016–2017 | Germany U19 | 2 | (0) |
- * Club domestic league appearances and goals as of 28 June 2026

Luke Hemmerich (born 9 February 1998) is a German footballer who plays as a left-back for 3. Liga club Würzburger Kickers.

== Career statistics ==
As of 21 February 2019

| Club | Season | League | | | Cup | | Total | |
| Club | Season | Division | Apps | Goals | Apps | Goals | Apps | Goals |
|---|---|---|---|---|---|---|---|---|
| FC Schalke 04 | 2017–18 | Bundesliga | 0 | 2 | 0 | 0 | 0 | 0 |
| VfL Bochum | 2017–18 | 2. Bundesliga | 7 | 0 | 1 | 0 | 8 | 0 |
| Erzgebirge Aue | 2018–19 | 2. Bundesliga | 2 | 0 | 0 | 0 | 2 | 0 |
| Energie Cottbus | 2018–19 | 3. Liga | 2 | 0 | 0 | 0 | 2 | 0 |
| Career total | | | 11 | 0 | 1 | 0 | 12 | 0 |
