= 2009–10 FC Schalke 04 season =

Schalke
2009–10 season
- President: Josef Schnusenberg
- Head coach: Felix Magath
- Stadium: Veltins-Arena
- Bundesliga: 2nd
- DFB-Pokal: Semi-finals
- Top goalscorer: League: Kevin Kurányi (18); All: Kevin Kurányi (20)
Home colours	Away colours	Third colours

The 2009–10 season was the 106th season in Schalke 04's history. The team competed in the Bundesliga and DFB-Pokal.

== Season summary ==
Schalke's first season under Felix Magath saw a welcome return to the Champions League after a season's absence.

== Players ==
=== First-team squad ===
Squad at end of season Note: Flags indicate national team as defined under FIFA eligibility rules; some limited exceptions apply. Players may hold more than one non-FIFA nationality.

No.	Pos.	Nation	Player
1	GK	GER	Manuel Neuer
2	DF	GER	Heiko Westermann (captain)
3	DF	NOR	Tore Reginiussen
4	DF	GER	Benedikt Höwedes
5	DF	BRA	Marcelo Bordon
6	MF	GER	Albert Streit (Note: Streit was born in Bucharest, Romania, but also qualified to represent Germany internationally and represented them at U-16, U-17, U-18, and B level.)
7	MF	CHN	Hao Junmin
8	MF	BRA	Mineiro
9	FW	BRA	Edu
10	MF	CRO	Ivan Rakitić (Note: Rakitić was born in Möhlin, Switzerland, and represented them at U-16, U-17, U-19 and U-21 level, but also qualified to represent Croatia through his parents and made his international debut for Croatia in September 2007.)
11	MF	GER	Alexander Baumjohann
12	MF	GER	Peer Kluge
13	MF	GER	Jermaine Jones (Note: Jones was born in Frankfurt, West Germany, and represented them at U-20, U-21 and B level and made his international debut for Germany in 2008, but also qualified to represent the United States through his father and made his international debut for the United States in October 2010.)
14	FW	GER	Gerald Asamoah (Note: Asamoah was born in Mampong, Ghana, but was raised in Germany from the age of 12 and made his international debut for Germany in May 2001.)
15	MF	BRA	Zé Roberto
16	MF	CZE	Jan Morávek
17	FW	PER	Jefferson Farfán
18	DF	BRA	Rafinha
19	FW	SUI	Mario Gavranović

No.	Pos.	Nation	Player
20	MF	GRE	Vasilios Pliatsikas
21	MF	GER	Lukas Schmitz
22	FW	GER	Kevin Kurányi (Note: Kurányi was born in Rio de Janeiro, Brazil, but also qualified to represent Germany internationally through his father and Panama through his mother and represented Germany at U20, U-21 and B level before making his international debut for Germany in March 2003.)
23	MF	TUR	Emin Yalın (Note: Yalın was born in Frankfurt, West Germany, but also holds Turkish citizenship.)
24	DF	GER	Christian Pander
25	DF	PER	Carlos Zambrano
26	MF	GER	Danny Latza
27	FW	URU	Vicente Sánchez
28	MF	GER	Christoph Moritz
29	FW	GER	Bogdan Müller (Note: Müller was born in Karaganda, Kazakh SSR, Soviet Union (now Kazakhstan), but also holds German citizenship.)
30	MF	GEO	Levan Kenia
31	FW	GER	David Loheider
32	DF	CMR	Joël Matip (Note: Matip was born in Bochum, Germany, but also qualified to represent Cameroon internationally and made his international debut for Cameroon in March 2010.)
33	GK	GER	Mathias Schober
34	FW	MKD	Besart Ibraimi
35	GK	GER	Mohamed Amsif (Note: Amsif was born in Düsseldorf, West Germany, and represented them at U-18, U-19 and U-20 level, but also qualified to represent Morocco internationally and made his international debut for Morocco in 2011.)
39	DF	GER	Marvin Pachan
40	MF	SRB	Predrag Stevanović (Note: Stevanović was born in Essen, West Germany, but also qualified to represent Serbia internationally and represented them at U-19 level.)

=== Left club during season ===
Note: Flags indicate national team as defined under FIFA eligibility rules; some limited exceptions apply. Players may hold more than one non-FIFA nationality.

No.	Pos.	Nation	Player
3	DF	GEO	Levan Kobiashvili (to Hertha BSC)
7	FW	GER	Lewis Holtby (on loan to Bochum)
19	MF	TUR	Halil Altıntop (Note: Altıntop was born in Gelsenkirchen, West Germany, but also qualified to represent Turkey internationally and represented them at U-18, U-20, U-21 and B level before making his international debut for Turkey in 2005.) (to Eintracht Frankfurt)

No.	Pos.	Nation	Player
21	MF	URU	Carlos Grossmüller (on loan to Danubio)
29	DF	SVK	Ľuboš Hanzel (on loan from Spartak Trnava)

== Transfers ==
=== In ===
Date	Position	Player Name	Previous Club
7 July 2009	MF	(Germany) Lewis Holtby	(Germany) Alemannia Aachen
13 August 2009	MF	(Brazil) Mineiro	(England) Chelsea
2 July 2009	MF	(Czech Republic) Jan Morávek	(Czech Republic) Bohemians 1905
2 July 2009	MF	(Greece) Vasilios Pliatsikas	(Greece) AEK Athens
2 July 2009	MF	(Turkey) Emin Yalin	(Germany) 1. FC Nürnberg II

== Kits ==
Home	Home Alternate	Away	Third

Type	Shirt	Shorts	Socks	First appearance / Info
Home	Blue	Blue	Blue	
Home Alt.	Blue	White	Blue	Bundesliga, Match 7, September 26 in Dortmund
Away	Black	Black	Black	
Third	White	White	White	

== Competitions ==
=== Bundesliga ===
==== League table ====
Pos	Team	Pld	W	D	L	GF	GA	GD	Pts	Qualification or relegation
1	Bayern Munich (C)	34	20	10	4	72	31	+41	70	Qualification to Champions League group stage
2	Schalke 04	34	19	8	7	53	31	+22	65	Qualification to Champions League group stage
3	Werder Bremen	34	17	10	7	71	40	+31	61	Qualification to Champions League play-off round
4	Bayer Leverkusen	34	15	14	5	65	38	+27	59	Qualification to Europa League play-off round
5	Borussia Dortmund	34	16	9	9	54	42	+12	57	Qualification to Europa League play-off round

Source: kicker.de (in German)
Rules for classification: 1) points; 2) goal difference; 3) number of goals scored.
(C) Champions

==== Results summary ====
Overall								Home						Away					
Pld	W	D	L	GF	GA	GD	Pts	W	D	L	GF	GA	GD	W	D	L	GF	GA	GD
34	19	8	7	53	31	+22	65	11	2	4	29	15	+14	8	6	3	24	16	+8

Source: Soccerway

==== Matches ====
8 August 2009 1	1. FC Nürnberg	1–2	Schalke 04	Nuremberg
15:30 CEST (UTC+2)	Mnari (yellow card) 25'; Wolf (yellow card) 64'; Mintál 88'	Report	Kurányi 36', 50'; Westermann (yellow card) 64'	Stadium: easyCredit-Stadion; Referee: Knut Kircher; Assistant referees: Robert Kempter, Stefan Lupp; Fourth official: Wolfgang Walz

16 August 2009 2	Schalke 04	3–0	VfL Bochum	Gelsenkirchen
17:30 CEST (UTC+2)	Moritz 38'; Westermann 45+1', (yellow card) 55'; Farfán 76'	Report	Epalle (yellow card) 21'; Freier (yellow card) 63'	Stadium: Veltins-Arena; Referee: Günter Perl; Assistant referees: Josef Maier, Georg Schalk; Fourth official: Stefan Trautmann

21 August 2009 3	1899 Hoffenheim	0–0	Schalke 04	Sinsheim
20:30 CEST (UTC+2)	Vorsah (yellow card) 28'; Salihović (yellow card) 36'; Obasi (yellow card) 82'; Eichner (yellow card) 84'	Report	Pliatsikas (yellow card) 17'; Zambrano (yellow card) 30'; Höwedes (yellow card) 64'; Bordon (yellow card) 78'	Stadium: Rhein-Neckar-Arena; Referee: Michael Weiner; Assistant referees: Thomas Frank, Carsten Kadach; Fourth official: Christian Schößling

29 August 2009 4	Schalke 04	0–1	SC Freiburg	Gelsenkirchen
15:30 CEST (UTC+2)		Report	Cha 40'	Stadium: Veltins-Arena; Referee: Helmut Fleischer; Assistant referees: Sönke Glindemann, Guido Kleve; Fourth official: Frank Willenborg

13 September 2009 5	1. FC Köln	1–2	Schalke 04	Cologne
17:30 CEST (UTC+2)	Podolski 6'; Petit (yellow card) 28'; Novaković (yellow card) 31'	Report	Farfán 2'; Neuer (yellow card) 35'; Zambrano (yellow card) 37'; Kobiashvili 46'	Stadium: RheinEnergieStadion; Referee: Jochen Drees; Assistant referees: Torsten Bauer, Markus Wingenbach; Fourth official: Mark Borsch

18 September 2009 6	Schalke 04	1–2	VfL Wolfsburg	Gelsenkirchen
20:30 CEST (UTC+2)	Höwedes 80'	Report	Džeko 55', 81'; Martins (yellow card) 90+2'	Stadium: Veltins-Arena; Referee: Manuel Gräfe; Assistant referees: Markus Hacker, Sascha Thielert; Fourth official: Dirk Margenberg

26 September 2009 7	Borussia Dortmund	0–1	Schalke 04	Dortmund
15:30 CEST (UTC+2)		Report	Farfán 31'; Moritz (yellow card) 85'	Stadium: Signal Iduna Park; Referee: Wolfgang Stark; Assistant referees: Mike Pickel, Jan-Hendrik Salver; Fourth official: Felix Zwayer

2 October 2009 8	Schalke 04	2–0	Eintracht Frankfurt	Gelsenkirchen
20:30 CEST (UTC+2)	Zambrano (yellow card) 48'; Asamoah 66', (yellow card) 87'; Farfán (yellow card) 74', (goal) 90+2' (pen.); Rafinha (yellow card) 79'	Report	Schwegler (yellow card) 18' (yellow-red card) 85'; Chris (yellow card) 86'; Teber (yellow card) 88'; Zimmermann (yellow card) 90+1'	Stadium: Veltins-Arena; Referee: Michael Kempter; Assistant referees: Christian Leicher, Thorsten Schiffner; Fourth official: Sönke Glindemann

17 October 2009 9	VfB Stuttgart	1–2	Schalke 04	Stuttgart
15:30 CEST (UTC+2)	Magnin (yellow card) 33'; Khedira (yellow card) 38'; Cacau (yellow card) 58', (goal) 73'; Tasci (yellow card) 77'	Report	Rakitić 24'; Mineiro (yellow card) 43'; Moritz (yellow card) 50'; Kurányi 76'; Farfán (yellow card) 90+3'	Stadium: Mercedes-Benz Arena; Referee: Felix Brych; Assistant referees: Marco Achmüller, Robert Hartmann; Fourth official: Josef Maier

25 October 2009 10	Schalke 04	3–3	Hamburger SV	Gelsenkirchen
17:30 CET (UTC+1)	Bordon (yellow card) 29'; Kurányi 50', 90'; Schmitz 62'; Zambrano (yellow card) 86'	Report	Berg 26', 80'; Trochowski 45'; Mathijsen (yellow card) 52'; Elia (yellow card) 53'; Rozehnal (red card) 61'; Jarolím (yellow card) 63'	Stadium: Veltins-Arena; Referee: Manuel Gräfe; Assistant referees: Christoph Bornhorst, Markus Hacker; Fourth official: Tobias Welz

31 October 2009 11	Schalke 04	2–2	Bayer Leverkusen	Gelsenkirchen
18:30 CET (UTC+1)	Farfán (yellow card) 10'; Rafinha (yellow card) 78'; Bordon (yellow card) 81'; Kurányi 83'; Sánchez 88'	Report	Schwaab (yellow card) 3'; Kroos 29'; Kießling 44'; Reinartz (yellow card) 55'	Stadium: Veltins-Arena; Referee: Michael Weiner; Assistant referees: Thomas Frank, Norbert Grudzinski; Fourth official: Bastian Dankert

7 November 2009 12	Bayern Munich	1–1	Schalke 04	Munich
15:30 CET (UTC+1)	Van Buyten 31'; Robben (yellow card) 57'; Schweinsteiger (yellow card) 63'	Report	Sánchez (yellow card) 30'; Kurányi (yellow card) 34'; Matip 43'; Schmitz (yellow card) 57'; Zambrano (yellow card) 79'	Stadium: Allianz Arena; Referee: Florian Meyer; Assistant referees: Carsten Kadach, Frank Willenborg; Fourth official: Christian Schößling

21 November 2009 13	Schalke 04	2–0	Hannover 96	Gelsenkirchen
15:30 CET (UTC+1)	Rafinha (yellow card) 54'; Farfán 69'; Morávek 90+1'	Report	Schulz (yellow card) 42'; Pinto (yellow card) 59'	Stadium: Veltins-Arena; Referee: Lutz Wagner; Assistant referees: Bastian Dankert, Daniel Siebert; Fourth official: Robert Kampka

28 November 2009 14	Borussia Mönchengladbach	1–0	Schalke 04	Mönchengladbach
18:30 CET (UTC+1)	Reus 5'	Report	Rafinha (yellow card) 33'; Morávek (yellow card) 70'; Neuer (yellow card) 82'; Bordon (yellow card) 88'; Holtby (yellow card) 90'	Stadium: Borussia-Park; Referee: Wolfgang Stark; Assistant referees: Mike Pickel, Jan-Hendrik Salver; Fourth official: Christian Dingert

6 December 2009 15	Schalke 04	2–0	Hertha BSC	Gelsenkirchen
17:30 CET (UTC+1)	Kurányi 59'; Bordon (yellow card) 70'; Rafinha 90+2' (pen.)	Report	Janker (yellow card) 40' (yellow-red card) 86'; Wichniarek (yellow card) 86'; Cícero (yellow card) 90+3'	Stadium: Veltins-Arena; Referee: Knut Kircher; Assistant referees: Christian Leicher, Stefan Lupp; Fourth official: Thorsten Schriever

12 December 2009 16	Werder Bremen	0–2	Schalke 04	Bremen
18:30 CET (UTC+1)	Boenisch (yellow card) 51'; Hunt (yellow card) 61'; Frings (yellow card) 75'	Report	Kurányi 47', (yellow card) 63'; Morávek 72'; Farfán (yellow card) 85'	Stadium: Weserstadion; Referee: Helmut Fleischer; Assistant referees: Sönke Glindemann, Guido Kleve; Fourth official: Norbert Grudzinski

18 December 2009 17	Schalke 04	1–0	Mainz 05	Gelsenkirchen
20:30 CET (UTC+1)	Farfán 12'	Report	Polanski (yellow card) 88'	Stadium: Veltins-Arena; Referee: Deniz Aytekin; Assistant referees: Walter Hofmann, Georg Schalk; Fourth official: Dirk Margenberg

17 January 2010 18	Schalke 04	1–0	1. FC Nürnberg	Gelsenkirchen
15:30 CET (UTC+1)	Kurányi 48'; Edu (yellow card) 85'	Report	Gündoğan (yellow card) 34'; Pinola (yellow card) 49'; Ottl (yellow card) 88'	Stadium: Veltins-Arena; Referee: Michael Kempter; Assistant referees: Mark Borsch, Tobias Welz; Fourth official: Christian Bandurski

23 January 2010 19	VfL Bochum	2–2	Schalke 04	Bochum
15:30 CET (UTC+1)	Hashemian 82'; Mavraj (yellow card) 86'; Šesták 90+2'	Report	Sánchez 5'; Kurányi 42'	Stadium: RewirpowerSTADION; Referee: Wolfgang Stark; Assistant referees: Mike Pickel, Jan-Hendrik Salver; Fourth official: Frank Willenborg

30 January 2010 20	Schalke 04	2–0	1899 Hoffenheim	Gelsenkirchen
18:30 CET (UTC+1)	Kurányi 19'; Rakitić (yellow card) 43'; Schmitz 49'; Matip (yellow card) 79'	Report	Eichner (yellow card) 7'; Salihović (yellow card) 37'; Beck (yellow card) 40'; Nilsson (yellow card) 86'	Stadium: Veltins-Arena; Referee: Florian Meyer; Assistant referees: Carsten Kadach, Frank Willenborg; Fourth official: Frederick Assmuth

6 February 2010 21	SC Freiburg	0–0	Schalke 04	Freiburg
15:30 CET (UTC+1)	Williams (yellow card) 88'	Report	Baumjohann (yellow card) 32'; Schmitz (yellow card) 66'; Rakitić (yellow card) 87'	Stadium: Badenova-Stadion; Referee: Jochen Drees; Assistant referees: Torsten Bauer, Tobias Christ; Fourth official: Volker Wezel

14 February 2010 22	Schalke 04	2–0	1. FC Köln	Gelsenkirchen
15:30 CET (UTC+1)	Matip (yellow card) 28', (goal) 45+1'; Rafinha (yellow card) 74'; Farfán 81'	Report	Schorch (yellow card) 5'	Stadium: Veltins-Arena; Referee: Peter Gagelmann; Assistant referees: Matthias Anklam, Sascha Thielert; Fourth official: Thorsten Schriever

21 February 2010 23	VfL Wolfsburg	2–1	Schalke 04	Wolfsburg
17:30 CET (UTC+1)	Pekarík (yellow card) 45'; Grafite 71', 77'	Report	Kurányi 30'	Stadium: Volkswagen Arena; Referee: Helmut Fleischer; Assistant referees: Sönke Glindemann, Christian Leicher; Fourth official: Patrick Ittrich

26 February 2010 24	Schalke 04	2–1	Borussia Dortmund	Gelsenkirchen
20:30 CET (UTC+1)	Kurányi (yellow card) 54'; Höwedes 66'; Rakitić 83'; Schmitz (yellow card) 89'	Report	Şahin 47' (pen.); Valdez (yellow card) 56'; Błaszczykowski (yellow card) 68'; Bender (yellow card) 76'; Großkreutz (yellow card) 90+2'	Stadium: Veltins-Arena; Referee: Manuel Gräfe; Assistant referees: Markus Hacker, Tobias Welz; Fourth official: Stefan Trautmann

6 March 2010 25	Eintracht Frankfurt	1–4	Schalke 04	Frankfurt
15:30 CET (UTC+1)	Meier 52'; Schwegler (yellow card) 73'	Report	Matip 12'; Höwedes 15'; Zambrano (yellow card) 54'; Rakitić 80'; Rafinha (yellow card) 85'; Kurányi 89'	Stadium: Commerzbank-Arena; Referee: Guido Winkmann; Assistant referees: Christian Bandurski, Dirk Margenberg; Fourth official: Daniel Siebert

12 March 2010 26	Schalke 04	2–1	VfB Stuttgart	Gelsenkirchen
20:30 CET (UTC+1)	Höwedes (yellow card) 28'; Edu 46'; Kurányi 55'; Rafinha (yellow card) 70'	Report	Niedermeier (yellow card) 17'; Tasci 50', (yellow card) 72'	Stadium: Veltins-Arena; Referee: Lutz Wagner; Assistant referees: Christoph Bornhorst, Norbert Grudzinski; Fourth official: Stefan Lupp

21 March 2010 27	Hamburger SV	2–2	Schalke 04	Hamburg
15:30 CET (UTC+1)	Van Nistelrooy 40'; Jansen (yellow card) 57'; Pitroipa 77'	Report	Kluge (yellow card) 14'; Höwedes (yellow card) 56'; Kurányi 62'; Rakitić 68' (pen.)	Stadium: HSH Nordbank Arena; Referee: Wolfgang Stark; Assistant referees: Robert Kempter, Jan-Hendrik Salver; Fourth official: Thomas Metzen

27 March 2010 28	Bayer Leverkusen	0–2	Schalke 04	Leverkusen
18:30 CET (UTC+1)	Schwaab (yellow card) 13'; Kroos (yellow card) 40'; Kadlec (yellow card) 88'	Report	Kurányi 11', 27'; Bordon (yellow card) 42'; Rakitić (yellow card) 59'	Stadium: BayArena; Referee: Michael Weiner; Assistant referees: Thomas Frank, Norbert Grudzinski; Fourth official: Robert Kampka

3 April 2010 29	Schalke 04	1–2	Bayern Munich	Gelsenkirchen
15:30 CEST (UTC+2)	Bordon (yellow card) 23' (yellow-red card) 90+4'; Kurányi 31', (yellow card) 90+3'; Rafinha (yellow card) 67'	Report	Ribéry 25'; Müller 26'; Altıntop (yellow card) 34' (yellow-red card) 41'; Demichelis (yellow card) 45+1'; Butt (yellow card) 90+1'	Stadium: Veltins-Arena; Referee: Manuel Gräfe; Assistant referees: Christian Dingert, Markus Hacker; Fourth official: Felix Zwayer

10 April 2010 30	Hannover 96	4–2	Schalke 04	Hanover
15:30 CEST (UTC+2)	Westermann 17' (o.g.); Ya Konan 29', 90+2', (yellow card) 74'; Pinto (yellow card) 75'; Balitsch 80'; Schulz (yellow card) 82'; Cherundolo (yellow card) 89'	Report	Schmitz (yellow card) 43'; Edu 46'; Rakitić 52' (pen.)	Stadium: AWD-Arena; Referee: Peter Gagelmann; Assistant referees: Matthias Anklam, Sascha Thielert; Fourth official: Michael Emmer

17 April 2010 31	Schalke 04	3–1	Borussia Mönchengladbach	Gelsenkirchen
15:30 CEST (UTC+2)	Rakitić 8', 47' (pen.); Farfán 45'; Höwedes (yellow card) 71'	Report	Bobadilla 16', (yellow card) 33'; Matmour (yellow card) 44'	Stadium: Veltins-Arena; Referee: Deniz Aytekin; Assistant referees: Christian Leicher, Thorsten Schiffner; Fourth official: Thorsten Schriever

24 April 2010 32	Hertha BSC	0–1	Schalke 04	Berlin
15:30 CEST (UTC+2)	Kobiashvili (yellow card) 34'; Lustenberger (yellow card) 37'	Report	Westermann (yellow card) 31', (goal) 87'	Stadium: Olympiastadion; Referee: Jochen Drees; Assistant referees: Torsten Bauer, Tobias Welz; Fourth official: Christoph Bornhorst

1 May 2010 33	Schalke 04	0–2	Werder Bremen	Gelsenkirchen
15:30 CEST (UTC+2)	Rafinha (yellow card) 70'	Report	Özil 55', (yellow card) 60'; Almeida 64'; Borowski (yellow card) 73'	Stadium: Veltins-Arena; Referee: Knut Kircher; Assistant referees: Stefan Lupp, Tobias Stieler; Fourth official: Stefan Trautmann

8 May 2010 34	Mainz 05	0–0	Schalke 04	Mainz
15:30 CEST (UTC+2)	Karhan (penalty missed) 74'; Ivanschitz (yellow card) 78'	Report	Neuer (yellow card) 74'; Rafinha (yellow card) 76'	Stadium: Bruchwegstadion; Referee: Babak Rafati; Assistant referees: Norbert Grudzinski, Holger Henschel; Fourth official: Guido Kleve

=== DFB-Pokal ===
1 August 2009 First round	Germania Windeck	0–4	Schalke 04	Cologne
19:30 UTC+2		Report (in German)	Zambrano 10'; Kurányi 43'; Kenia 68'; Höwedes 85'	Stadium: RheinEnergieStadion; Attendance: 20,000; Referee: Jochen Drees (Münster-Sarmsheim)

22 September 2009 Second round	VfL Bochum	0–3	Schalke 04	Bochum
20:30 UTC+2		Report (in German)	Westermann 10'; Altıntop 56'; Fuchs 76' (o.g.)	Stadium: rewirpowerSTADION; Attendance: 29,592; Referee: Florian Meyer (Burgdorf)

28 October 2009 Round of 16	1860 München	0–3	Schalke 04	Munich
19:00 UTC+1		Report (in German)	Rafinha 41'; Höwedes 48', 81'	Stadium: Allianz Arena; Attendance: 28,500; Referee: Markus Schmidt (Stuttgart)

10 February 2010 Quarter-finals	VfL Osnabrück	0–1	Schalke 04	Osnabrück
20:30 UTC+1		Report (in German)	Kurányi 59'	Stadium: Osnatel-Arena; Attendance: 16,130; Referee: Manuel Gräfe (Berlin)

24 March 2010 Semi-finals	Schalke 04	0–1 (a.e.t.)	Bayern Munich	Gelsenkirchen
20:30 GMT+1		Report (in German)	Robben 112'	Stadium: Arena AufSchalke; Attendance: 61,673; Referee: Knut Kircher (Rottenburg)
