= 2015–16 FC Schalke 04 season =

Schalke 04
2015–16 season
- President: Clemens Tönnies
- Head coach: André Breitenreiter
- Stadium: Veltins-Arena
- Bundesliga: 5th
- DFB-Pokal: Second round
- UEFA Europa League: Round of 32
- Top goalscorer: League: Klaas-Jan Huntelaar (12); All: Klaas-Jan Huntelaar (16)
- Highest home attendance: 62,271 (21 November vs. Bayern, 24 January vs. Bremen, 18 March vs. Mönchengladbach, 23 April vs. Leverkusen, 7 May vs. Augsburg)
- Lowest home attendance: 42,447 (1 October vs. Asteras Tripolis)
Home colours	Away colours	Third colours

The 2015–16 FC Schalke 04 season was the 112th season in the club's football history. In 2015–16 the club plays in the Bundesliga, the top tier of German football. It is the club's 23rd consecutive season in the Bundesliga, having been promoted from the 2. Bundesliga in 1991.

== Transfers ==
=== In ===
No.	Pos.	Name	Age	NAT	Moving from	Type	Transfer Window	Contract ends	Transfer fee	Sources
21	MF	Alessandro Schöpf	21	Austria	1. FC Nürnberg	Transfer	Winter	2019	€5,000,000	
11	MF	Younès Belhanda	25	Morocco	Dynamo Kyiv	Loan	Winter	2016	Free	
16	FW	Fabian Reese	18	Germany	Schalke 04 U19	Promoted	Winter	2019	—	
20	DF	Thilo Kehrer	19	Germany	Schalke 04 II	Promoted	Winter	2019	—	
	FW	Felix Schröter	20	Germany	1. FC Heidenheim	End of Loan	Winter	2018	—	
5	MF	Johannes Geis	21	Germany	Mainz 05	Transfer	Summer	2019	€12,000,000	
31	DF	Matija Nastasić	22	Serbia	Manchester City	Transfer	Summer	2019	€9,500,000	
9	FW	Franco Di Santo	26	Argentina	Werder Bremen	Transfer	Summer	2019	€6,000,000	
3	DF	Júnior Caiçara	26	Brazil	Ludogorets Razgrad	Transfer	Summer	2018	€4,500,000	
35	GK	Alexander Nübel	18	Germany	SC Paderborn	Transfer	Summer	2018	€200,000	
27	DF	Sascha Riether	32	Germany	SC Freiburg	Transfer	Summer	2016	Free	
23	MF	Pierre-Emile Højbjerg	20	Denmark	Bayern Munich	Loan	Summer	2016	€1,000,000	
30	GK	Michael Gspurning	34	Austria	Schalke 04 II	Promoted	Summer	2016	—	
—	FW	Felix Schröter	19	Germany	Schalke 04 II	Promoted	Summer	2018	—	
36	FW	Felix Platte	19	Germany	Schalke 04 U19	Promoted	Summer	2018	—	
19	MF	Leroy Sané	19	Germany	Schalke 04 U19	Promoted	Summer	2017	—	
14	DF	Kyriakos Papadopoulos	23	Greece	Bayer Leverkusen	End of Loan	Summer	2016	—	—
28	DF	Felipe Santana	29	Brazil	Olympiacos	End of Loan	Summer	2016	—	—

=== Out ===
No.	Pos.	Name	Age	NAT	Moving to	Type	Transfer Window	Transfer fee	Sources
28	DF	Felipe Santana	29	Brazil	Kuban Krasnodar	Transfer	Winter	Free	
—	MF	Kevin-Prince Boateng	28	Ghana	Milan	Transfer	Winter	Free	
36	FW	Felix Platte	19	Germany	Darmstadt 98	Loan	Winter	Free	
24	DF	Kaan Ayhan	21	Turkey	Eintracht Frankfurt	Loan	Winter	Free	
10	MF	Julian Draxler	21	Germany	VfL Wolfsburg	Transfer	Summer	€36,000,000	
17	MF	Jefferson Farfán	30	Peru	Al-Jazira	Transfer	Summer	€7,000,000	
14	DF	Kyriakos Papadopoulos	23	Greece	Bayer Leverkusen	Transfer	Summer	€6,500,000	
27	MF	Tranquillo Barnetta	30	Switzerland	Philadelphia Union	Transfer	Summer	Free	
23	DF	Christian Fuchs	29	Austria	Leicester City	Transfer	Summer	Free	
37	DF	Pascal Itter	20	Germany	SV Grödig	Transfer	Summer	Free	
20	FW	Chinedu Obasi	29	Nigeria	Free agent	End of contract	Summer	Free	
—	FW	Felix Schröter	19	Germany	1. FC Heidenheim	Loan	Summer	Free	
40	GK	Timon Wellenreuther	19	Germany	Mallorca	Loan	Summer	Free	
28	GK	Christian Wetklo	35	Germany	Schalke 04 II	Intern	Summer	—	
3	MF	Jan Kirchhoff	24	Germany	Bayern Munich	End of Loan	Summer	—	—
31	DF	Matija Nastasić	22	Serbia	Manchester City	End of Loan	Summer	—	—

== Kit ==
Supplier: Adidas / Sponsor: Gazprom

Home	Home Alt.	Home 2016-17	Away	Away Alt.	Away Alt. 2	Third	Third Alt.

=== Kit information ===
Adidas continues its supply of the Schalke 04 kit, a relationship dating back to the 1975–76 season. Gazprom is the current sponsor, dating back to the middle of the 2006–07 season.

- Home: Previous season's blue home shirt, white shorts and blue socks confirmed as the current home kit with white three Adidas stripes due to Schalke 04's two-season home kit tradition.
- Home alternate: Same as home but including blue alternate shorts.
- Away: The away kit features a Marseille-inspired traditional home kit with light grey hoop, aqua blue three Adidas stripes, aqua blue shorts with white three Adidas stripes and white socks.
- Away alternate: Same as away kit but including white shorts with aqua blue three Adidas stripes and white socks.
- Away alternate 2: Same as away kit but including aqua blue shorts with white three Adidas stripes and aqua blue socks.
- Third: The third kit with white three Adidas stripes features a gradiented-hoop pattern, running from dark green to green, with black sleeve, all black back panel and all black shorts.
- Third alternate: Same as third kit but including green shorts with white three Adidas stripes and green socks.

=== Kit usage ===
Kit	Description	Usage
Home	Blue body with white shorts and blue socks.	Used in all home Bundesliga, DFB-Pokal, UEFA Europa League, friendly matches (against Twente), away Bundesliga matches against Bayern Munich, Borussia Dortmund, Mainz 05, FC Ingolstadt and away friendly matches against Wolfsberger AC.
Home alt.	Blue body with blue shorts and blue socks.	Used in away matches against VfB Stuttgart, FC Augsburg, 1. FC Köln, VfL Wolfsburg, Borussia Mönchengladbach and friendly match against Lechia Gdańsk.
Away	White-light grey hoop with aqua shorts and white socks.	Used in away matches against Bayer Leverkusen and Eintracht Frankfurt, UEFA Europa League away match against Shakhtar Donetsk and friendly matches against VfL Osnabrück, Udinese.
Away alt. I	White-light grey hoop body with white shorts and socks.	Used in away matches against Werder Bremen, Darmstadt 98, Hannover 96.
Away alt. II	White-light grey hoop with aqua shorts and aqua socks.	Used in UEFA Europa League away match against Sparta Prague.
Third	Dark green to green gradient hoop body with black sleeve, back panel, shorts and socks.	Used in away matches against Hamburger SV, 1899 Hoffenheim, friendly matches against Austria Klagenfurt, Porto, all-DFB Pokal opponent's white-blue, sky blue and yellow-blue home kit away matches and UEFA Europa League away matches against APOEL and Asteras Tripolis.
Third alt.	Dark green to green gradient hoop body with black sleeve and back panel, green shorts and socks.	Used in away match against Hertha BSC.

=== Kit record ===
Type	Shirt	Shorts	Socks	Record						
Type	Shirt	Shorts	Socks	G	W	D	L	GF	GA	GD
Home	Blue	White	Blue	23	11	5	7	39	34	+5
Home Alt.	Blue	Blue	Blue	6	2	0	4	7	11	−4
Away	White	Light blue	White	5	0	3	2	1	7	−6
Away Alt. I	White	White	White	3	3	0	0	9	1	+8
Away Alt. II	White	Light blue	Light blue	1	0	1	0	1	1	+0
Third	Green	Black	Black	4	4	0	0	13	0	+13
Third Alt.	Green	Green	Green	1	0	0	1	0	2	−2
Home (Season 2016/2017)	Blue	White	Blue	1	0	1	0	1	1	0
				44	20	10	14	71	57	+14
Updated: 14 May 2016

== Friendlies ==
Win Draw Loss

8 July 2015 Friendly	Austria Klagenfurt	1–3	(Germany) Schalke 04	Klagenfurt, Austria
19:00 CEST (UTC+02:00)	Rep 49'	Report	Huntelaar 12'; Göcer 82'; Choupo-Moting 87'	Stadium: Wörthersee Stadion; Attendance: 2,700; Referee: Thomas Fröhlacher (Austria)

10 July 2015 Friendly	Wolfsberger AC (Austria)	3–1	(Germany) Schalke 04	Wolfsberg, Austria
18:30 CEST (UTC+02:00)	Drescher 5'; Hellquist 11'; Trdina 90'	Report	Huntelaar 57'	Stadium: Lavanttal-Arena; Attendance: 3,985; Referee: Helmut Trattnig (Austria)

14 July 2015 Friendly	Udinese (Italy)	1–1	(Germany) Schalke 04	Klagenfurt, Austria
20:00 CEST (UTC+02:00)	Di Natale 81'	Report	Huntelaar 38'	Stadium: Wörthersee Stadion; Attendance: 2,500; Referee: Stefan Krassnitzer (Austria)

19 July 2015 Friendly	VfL Osnabrück (Germany)	2–3	(Germany) Schalke 04	Osnabrück, Germany
18:00 CEST (UTC+02:00)	Savran 11', 56'	Report	Júnior Caiçara 39'; Ayhan 74'; Huntelaar 77'	Stadium: osnatel ARENA; Attendance: 12,000; Referee: Dr. Riem Hussein (Germany)

22 July 2015 Friendly	Lechia Gdańsk (Poland)	0–1	(Germany) Schalke 04	Gdańsk, Poland
18:30 CEST (UTC+02:00)		Report	Sané 44'	Stadium: PGE Arena Gdańsk; Attendance: 7,700; Referee: Tomasz Tobiański (Poland)

27 July 2015 Friendly	Schalke 04 (Germany)	0–0	(Portugal) Porto	Gütersloh, Germany
18:15 CEST (UTC+02:00)		Report		Stadium: Heidewaldstadion; Attendance: 7,513; Referee: Dr. Martin Thomsen (Germany)

2 August 2015 Friendly	Schalke 04 (Germany)	1–1	(Netherlands) Twente	Gelsenkirchen, Germany
17:30 CEST (UTC+02:00)	Geis 28'	Report	Olaitan 86'	Stadium: Veltins-Arena; Attendance: 33,315; Referee: Sascha Stegemann (Germany)

18 January 2016 Friendly	Arminia Bielefeld (Germany)	1–0	(Germany) Schalke 04	Bielefeld, Germany
20:00 CET (UTC+01:00)	Schuppan 17'	Report		Stadium: Schüco-Arena; Attendance: 11,916; Referee: Sören Storks (Germany)

=== Florida Cup 2016 ===
10 January 2016 Round 1	Fort Lauderdale Strikers (United States)	0–2	(Germany) Schalke 04	Orlando, United States
19:30 EST (UTC-05:00)		Report	Di Santo 30'; Sané 57'	Stadium: ESPN Wide World of Sports Complex; Attendance: 1,104; Referee: Daniel Fitzgerald (United States)

13 January 2016 Round 2	Atlético Mineiro (Brazil)	3–0	(Germany) Schalke 04	Fort Lauderdale, United States
18:30 EST (UTC-05:00)	Silva 8'; Patric 81'; Lucas Cândido 83'	Report		Stadium: Lockhart Stadium; Attendance: 2,504; Referee: Ted Unkel (United States)

== Competitions ==
Win Draw Loss

=== Bundesliga ===
==== League table ====
Pos	Team	Pld	W	D	L	GF	GA	GD	Pts	Qualification or relegation
3	Bayer Leverkusen	34	18	6	10	56	40	+16	60	Qualification for the Champions League group stage
4	Borussia Mönchengladbach	34	17	4	13	67	50	+17	55	Qualification for the Champions League play-off round
5	Schalke 04	34	15	7	12	51	49	+2	52	Qualification for the Europa League group stage (Note: Since the winners of the 2015–16 DFB-Pokal, Bayern Munich, qualified for the Champions League based on league position, the Europa League group stage spot was passed to the sixth-placed team, Mainz 05; and the Europa League third qualifying round spot was passed to the seventh-placed team, Hertha BSC.)
6	Mainz 05	34	14	8	12	46	42	+4	50	Qualification for the Europa League group stage
7	Hertha BSC	34	14	8	12	42	42	0	50	Qualification for the Europa League third qualifying round

Source: DFB
Rules for classification: 1) Points; 2) Goal difference; 3) Goals scored; 4) Head-to-head points; 5) Head-to-head goal difference; 6) Head-to-head away goals scored; 7) Away goals scored; 8) Play-offs.

==== Results summary ====
Overall								Home						Away					
Pld	W	D	L	GF	GA	GD	Pts	W	D	L	GF	GA	GD	W	D	L	GF	GA	GD
34	15	7	12	51	49	+2	52	8	5	4	28	24	+4	7	2	8	23	25	−2

Last updated: 14 May 2016.
Source: Bundesliga

==== Results by round ====
Round	1	2	3	4	5	6	7	8	9	10	11	12	13	14	15	16	17	18	19	20	21	22	23	24	25	26	27	28	29	30	31	32	33	34
Ground	A	H	A	H	A	H	A	H	H	A	H	A	H	A	H	A	H	H	A	H	A	H	A	H	A	A	H	A	H	A	H	A	H	A
Result	W	D	L	W	W	W	W	L	W	L	D	L	L	D	W	L	W	L	W	W	L	D	D	W	W	L	W	L	D	L	L	W	D	W
Position	3	4	9	5	4	3	3	3	3	3	4	5	7	8	6	8	6	6	5	4	5	6	7	6	4	5	4	7	7	7	7	6	7	5

Updated to match(es) played on 14 May 2016. Source: Bundesliga
A = Away; H = Home; W = Win; D = Draw; L = Loss

==== Matches ====
15 August 2015 1	Werder Bremen	0–3	Schalke 04	Bremen
15:30 CEST (UTC+02:00)		Report	Gebre Selassie 34' (o.g.); Choupo-Moting 68'; Aogo (yellow card) 77'; Höger (yellow card) 80'; Huntelaar 85'	Stadium: Weserstadion; Attendance: 42,100; Referee: Daniel Siebert

22 August 2015 2	Schalke 04	1–1	Darmstadt 98	Gelsenkirchen
15:30 CEST (UTC+02:00)	Draxler 47', (yellow card) 68'	Report	Rausch 9'; Sailer (yellow card) 52'; Wagner (yellow card) 90+4'	Stadium: Veltins-Arena; Attendance: 61,565; Referee: Benjamin Brand

28 August 2015 3	VfL Wolfsburg	3–0	Schalke 04	Wolfsburg
20:30 CEST (UTC+02:00)	Dost 17'; Luiz Gustavo (yellow card) 51'; R. Rodríguez 59' (pen.); Klose 61'	Report	Riether (yellow card) 52'; Aogo (yellow card) 73'	Stadium: Volkswagen Arena; Attendance: 30,000; Referee: Felix Brych

13 September 2015 4	Schalke 04	2–1	Mainz 05	Gelsenkirchen
17:30 CEST (UTC+02:00)	Matip 37', (yellow card) 84'; Huntelaar 61'	Report	Bengtsson (yellow card) 24'; Latza (yellow card) 40'; Mallı 42'; Bell (yellow card) 73'	Stadium: Veltins-Arena; Attendance: 60,083; Referee: Robert Hartmann

20 September 2015 5	VfB Stuttgart	0–1	Schalke 04	Stuttgart
15:30 CEST (UTC+02:00)	Klein (yellow card) 20'; Insúa (yellow card) 44'; Šunjić (yellow card) 75'	Report	Di Santo (yellow card) 49'; Sané (yellow card) 52', (goal) 53'; Aogo (yellow card) 61'	Stadium: Mercedes-Benz Arena; Attendance: 48,510; Referee: Manuel Gräfe

23 September 2015 6	Schalke 04	2–0	Eintracht Frankfurt	Gelsenkirchen
20:00 CEST (UTC+02:00)	Höger (yellow card) 12'; Matip 76'; Kolašinac (yellow card) 87'; Sané 90+1'	Report	Russ (yellow card) 65'; Abraham (yellow card) 79'	Stadium: Veltins-Arena; Attendance: 60,104; Referee: Felix Zwayer

26 September 2015 7	Hamburger SV	0–1	Schalke 04	Hamburg
18:30 CEST (UTC+02:00)	Djourou (yellow card) 83'	Report	Geis (yellow card) 19'; Sané 60'; Neustädter (yellow card) 64'; Fährmann (yellow card) 90'	Stadium: Volksparkstadion; Attendance: 53,192; Referee: Jochen Drees

4 October 2015 8	Schalke 04	0–3	1. FC Köln	Gelsenkirchen
15:30 CEST (UTC+02:00)	Geis (yellow card) 79'; Meyer (yellow card) 90+2'	Report	Modeste 45'; Bittencourt (yellow card) 50'; Risse (yellow card) 69'; Gerhardt 79'; Zoller 84'	Stadium: Veltins-Arena; Attendance: 61,723; Referee: Knut Kircher

17 October 2015 9	Schalke 04	2–1	Hertha BSC	Gelsenkirchen
15:30 CEST (UTC+02:00)	Di Santo (yellow card) 17'; Höwedes 27', (yellow card) 63'; Geis (yellow card) 75'; Meyer 90+2'	Report	Haraguchi (yellow card) 16'; Ibišević (red card) 18'; Langkamp (yellow card) 60'; Darida (yellow card) 70'; Kalou 73'; Hegeler (yellow card) 84'	Stadium: Veltins-Arena; Attendance: 61,336; Referee: Marco Fritz

25 October 2015 10	Borussia Mönchengladbach	3–1	Schalke 04	Mönchengladbach
17:30 CET (UTC+01:00)	Stindl 32'; Wendt (yellow card) 52'; Raffael 70', (yellow card) 72'; Korb 84'	Report	Júnior Caiçara (yellow card) 27'; Christensen 44' (o.g.); Höwedes (yellow card) 72'; Matip (yellow card) 80'; Geis (red card) 80'	Stadium: Stadion im Borussia-Park; Attendance: 54,010; Referee: Wolfgang Stark

31 October 2015 11	Schalke 04	1–1	FC Ingolstadt	Gelsenkirchen
15:30 CET (UTC+01:00)	Höwedes (yellow card) 60'; Sané 77'	Report	Levels 39'; Groß (yellow card) 61'; Hinterseer (yellow card) 72'	Stadium: Veltins-Arena; Attendance: 60,144; Referee: Florian Meyer

8 November 2015 12	Borussia Dortmund	3–2	Schalke 04	Dortmund
15:30 CET (UTC+01:00)	Kagawa 30'; Ginter 43'; Aubameyang 47', (yellow card) 48'; Schmelzer (yellow card) 82'; Weigl (yellow card) 89'	Report	Huntelaar 33', 71'; Goretzka (yellow card) 38'; Júnior Caiçara (yellow card) 46'; Di Santo (yellow card) 60'; Platte (yellow card) 90+1'	Stadium: Signal Iduna Park; Attendance: 79,956; Referee: Felix Brych

21 November 2015 13	Schalke 04	1–3	Bayern Munich	Gelsenkirchen
18:30 CET (UTC+01:00)	Meyer 17'; Huntelaar (yellow card) 61'; Højbjerg (yellow card) 82'	Report	Goretzka 9' (o.g.); Martínez 69'; Müller 90+2'	Stadium: Veltins-Arena; Attendance: 62,271; Referee: Tobias Stieler

29 November 2015 14	Bayer Leverkusen	1–1	Schalke 04	Leverkusen
17:30 CET (UTC+01:00)	Tah (yellow card) 8'; Riether 85' (o.g.)	Report	Choupo-Moting (yellow card) 38', (goal) 50'; Goretzka (yellow card) 75'	Stadium: BayArena; Attendance: 30,210; Referee: Marco Fritz

4 December 2015 15	Schalke 04	3–1	Hannover 96	Gelsenkirchen
20:30 CET (UTC+01:00)	Riether (yellow card) 9'; Geis 51' (pen.); Huntelaar 73'; Di Santo 82'	Report	Marcelo (yellow card) 51'; Saint-Maximin 81'	Stadium: Veltins-Arena; Attendance: 61,229; Referee: Wolfgang Stark

13 December 2015 16	FC Augsburg	2–1	Schalke 04	Augsburg
15:30 CET (UTC+01:00)	Kohr (yellow card) 3'; Koo (yellow card) 27'; Hong 34'; Caiuby 90+2'	Report	Kolašinac (yellow card) 32', (goal) 70'	Stadium: WWK ARENA; Attendance: 28,410; Referee: Florian Meyer

18 December 2015 17	Schalke 04	1–0	1899 Hoffenheim	Gelsenkirchen
20:30 CET (UTC+01:00)	Choupo-Moting 28'; Goretzka (yellow card) 90+1'	Report	Strobl (yellow card) 57'; Rudy (yellow card) 58'	Stadium: Veltins-Arena; Attendance: 60,749; Referee: Sascha Stegemann

24 January 2016 18	Schalke 04	1–3	Werder Bremen	Gelsenkirchen
17:30 CET (UTC+01:00)	Matip 4'; Kolašinac (yellow card) 77'	Report	Grillitsch (yellow card) 35'; Fritz 43'; Pizarro 53', (yellow card) 80'; Junuzović (yellow card) 58'; Ujah 89'	Stadium: Veltins-Arena; Attendance: 62,271; Referee: Christian Dingert

30 January 2016 19	Darmstadt 98	0–2	Schalke 04	Darmstadt
15:30 CET (UTC+01:00)	Rausch (yellow card) 55'; Niemeyer (yellow card) 66'; Rajković (yellow card) 83'	Report	Meyer 43', (yellow card) 59'; Sané 53'; Goretzka (yellow card) 84'	Stadium: Merck-Stadion am Böllenfalltor; Attendance: 17,000; Referee: Daniel Siebert

6 February 2016 20	Schalke 04	3–0	VfL Wolfsburg	Gelsenkirchen
15:30 CET (UTC+01:00)	Huntelaar 24', (yellow card) 26'; Geis 35', (yellow card) 49'; Schöpf 87'	Report	Kruse (yellow card) 30'; Bendtner (yellow card) 58'; Knoche (yellow card) 62'	Stadium: Veltins-Arena; Attendance: 61,483; Referee: Tobias Welz

12 February 2016 21	Mainz 05	2–1	Schalke 04	Mainz
20:30 CET (UTC+01:00)	Bussmann 33'; Latza (yellow card) 43'; Baumgartlinger 79'; Donati (yellow card) 81'; Balogun (yellow card) 90+3'	Report	Júnior Caiçara (yellow card) 45+1'; Belhanda 46'	Stadium: Coface Arena; Attendance: 32,107; Referee: Manuel Gräfe

21 February 2016 22	Schalke 04	1–1	VfB Stuttgart	Gelsenkirchen
17:30 CET (UTC+01:00)	Belhanda 14', (yellow card) 69'; Schöpf (yellow card) 75'; Sané (yellow card) 81'	Report	Didavi (yellow card) 28'; Harnik 74'	Stadium: Veltins-Arena; Attendance: 61,262; Referee: Bastian Dankert

28 February 2016 23	Eintracht Frankfurt	0–0	Schalke 04	Frankfurt
19:30 CET (UTC+01:00)	Hasebe (yellow card) 90+1'	Report	Aogo (yellow card) 88'; Meyer (yellow card) 90+1'	Stadium: Commerzbank-Arena; Attendance: 43,500; Referee: Felix Brych

2 March 2016 24	Schalke 04	3–2	Hamburger SV	Gelsenkirchen
20:00 CET (UTC+01:00)	Meyer 37'; Neustädter (yellow card) 43'; Júnior Caiçara (yellow card) 60'; Huntelaar 66'; Schöpf 77'	Report	N. Müller 4'; Djourou (yellow card) 40' (yellow-red card) 45'; Kačar 90+1'	Stadium: Veltins-Arena; Attendance: 60,856; Referee: Günter Perl

5 March 2016 25	1. FC Köln	1–3	Schalke 04	Cologne
15:30 CET (UTC+01:00)	Maroh (yellow card) 2'; Bittencourt 33'	Report	Huntelaar 2' (pen.); Meyer 23'; Di Santo 76'	Stadium: RheinEnergieSTADION; Attendance: 49,300; Referee: Wolfgang Stark

11 March 2016 26	Hertha BSC	2–0	Schalke 04	Berlin
20:30 CET (UTC+01:00)	Ibišević 42'; Skjelbred (yellow card) 56'; Stark 65'; Ciğerci (yellow card) 90+1'	Report	Júnior Caiçara (yellow card) 26'	Stadium: Olympiastadion; Attendance: 51,424; Referee: Tobias Welz

18 March 2016 27	Schalke 04	2–1	Borussia Mönchengladbach	Gelsenkirchen
20:30 CET (UTC+01:00)	Hinteregger 59' (o.g.); Kolašinac (yellow card) 64'; Goretzka 83'	Report	Christensen 79'	Stadium: Veltins-Arena; Attendance: 62,271; Referee: Marco Fritz

2 April 2016 28	FC Ingolstadt	3–0	Schalke 04	Ingolstadt
15:30 CEST (UTC+02:00)	Hartmann 29' (pen.); Groß (yellow card) 38'; Hinterseer 45+2'; Lezcano 65'	Report	Meyer (yellow card) 34'; Júnior Caiçara (yellow card) 35'; Sané (yellow card) 41'; Neustädter (yellow card) 80'; Matip (yellow card) 90'	Stadium: Audi Sportpark; Attendance: 15,200; Referee: Daniel Siebert

10 April 2016 29	Schalke 04	2–2	Borussia Dortmund	Gelsenkirchen
15:30 CEST (UTC+02:00)	Kolašinac (yellow card) 45'; Sané 51'; Riether (yellow card) 52'; Huntelaar 66' (pen.); Højbjerg (yellow card) 71'; Belhanda (yellow card) 81'; Neustädter (yellow card) 87'	Report	Şahin (yellow card) 31'; Kagawa 49'; Ginter 56'; Papastathopoulos (yellow card) 64'; Durm (yellow card) 72'	Stadium: Veltins-Arena; Attendance: 61,670; Referee: Felix Zwayer

16 April 2016 30	Bayern Munich	3–0	Schalke 04	Munich
18:30 CEST (UTC+02:00)	Lewandowski 54', 65'; Vidal 73'	Report		Stadium: Allianz Arena; Attendance: 75,000; Referee: Tobias Welz

23 April 2016 31	Schalke 04	2–3	Bayer Leverkusen	Gelsenkirchen
18:30 CEST (UTC+02:00)	Choupo-Moting 14'; Júnior Caiçara (yellow card) 27'; Sané 29', (yellow card) 38'; Højbjerg (yellow card) 52'	Report	Toprak (yellow card) 5'; Bender (yellow card) 33'; Brandt 54'; Bellarabi 56'; Hernández 60', (yellow card) 90+1'	Stadium: Veltins-Arena; Attendance: 62,271; Referee: Wolfgang Stark

30 April 2016 32	Hannover 96	1–3	Schalke 04	Hanover
15:30 CEST (UTC+02:00)	Sobiech 21'	Report	Choupo-Moting 11'; Huntelaar 45'; Schöpf 80'	Stadium: HDI-Arena; Attendance: 46,900; Referee: Günter Perl

7 May 2016 33	Schalke 04	1–1	FC Augsburg	Gelsenkirchen
15:30 CEST (UTC+02:00)	Goretzka (yellow card) 51'; Huntelaar 82'	Report	Baier (yellow card) 52', (goal) 89'; Finnbogason (yellow card) 62'; Gouweleeuw (yellow card) 69'; Caiuby (yellow card) 80'; Stafylidis (yellow card) 85'	Stadium: Veltins-Arena; Attendance: 62,271; Referee: Christian Dingert

14 May 2016 34	1899 Hoffenheim	1–4	Schalke 04	Sinsheim
15:30 CEST (UTC+02:00)	Uth 41'; Rudy (yellow card) 59'	Report	Huntelaar 7'; Choupo-Moting 14'; Sané 56'; Höwedes (yellow card) 68'; Schär 89' (o.g.)	Stadium: Wirsol Rhein-Neckar-Arena; Attendance: 30,150; Referee: Felix Brych

=== DFB-Pokal ===
8 August 2015 Round 1	MSV Duisburg	0–5	Schalke 04	Duisburg
15:30 CEST (UTC+02:00)	Grote (yellow card) 26'; Bajić (yellow card) 27' (yellow-red card) 31'; Wolze (yellow card) 62'	Report	Huntelaar 3'; Nastasić 39'; Geis 45+1'; Di Santo 62'; Goretzka 85'	Stadium: Schauinsland-Reisen-Arena; Attendance: 30,600; Referee: Wolfgang Stark

28 October 2015 Round 2	Schalke 04	0–2	Borussia Mönchengladbach	Gelsenkirchen
20:30 CET (UTC+01:00)	Júnior Caiçara (yellow card) 55'; Højbjerg (yellow card) 81'	Report	Wendt (yellow card) 15'; Stindl 42'; Hazard 53' (pen.)	Stadium: Veltins-Arena; Attendance: 60,655; Referee: Tobias Stieler

=== UEFA Europa League ===
==== Group stage ====
Pos	Team	Pld	W	D	L	GF	GA	GD	Pts	Qualification	SCH	SPP	AT	APO
1	(Germany) Schalke 04	6	4	2	0	15	3	+12	14	Advance to knockout phase	—	2–2	4–0	1–0
2	(Czech Republic) Sparta Prague	6	3	3	0	10	5	+5	12	Advance to knockout phase	1–1	—	1–0	2–0
3	(Greece) Asteras Tripolis	6	1	1	4	4	12	−8	4		0–4	1–1	—	2–0
4	(Cyprus) APOEL	6	1	0	5	3	12	−9	3		0–3	1–3	2–1	—

Source: Soccerway
Rules for classification: Group stage tiebreakers

17 September 2015 1	APOEL (Cyprus)	0–3	(Germany) Schalke 04	Nicosia, Cyprus
21:05 CEST (UTC+02:00)	Makrides (yellow card) 50'; Vander (yellow card) 72'; De Vincenti (red card) 77'	Report	Geis (yellow card) 10'; Matip 28'; Huntelaar 35', 71'; Di Santo (yellow card) 38'	Stadium: GSP Stadium; Attendance: 13,512; Referee: Tony Chapron (France)

1 October 2015 2	Schalke 04 (Germany)	4–0	(Greece) Asteras Tripolis	Gelsenkirchen, Germany
19:00 CEST (UTC+02:00)	Di Santo 28', 37', 44' (pen.); Huntelaar 84'	Report	Ederson (yellow card) 44'; Goian (yellow card) 46'	Stadium: Veltins-Arena; Attendance: 42,447; Referee: Pol van Boekel (Netherlands)

22 October 2015 3	Schalke 04 (Germany)	2–2	(Czech Republic) Sparta Prague	Gelsenkirchen, Germany
19:00 CEST (UTC+02:00)	Di Santo 6'; Højbjerg (yellow card) 35'; Sané 73'	Report	Fatai 50'; Lafata 63'; Nhamoinesu (yellow card) 68'; Hybš (yellow card) 87'	Stadium: Veltins-Arena; Attendance: 51,244; Referee: Artur Soares Dias (Portugal)

5 November 2015 4	Sparta Prague (Czech Republic)	1–1	(Germany) Schalke 04	Prague, Czech Republic
21:05 CET (UTC+01:00)	Lafata 6', (yellow card) 82'; Jiráček (yellow card) 53'; Matějovský (yellow card) 66'; Dočkal (yellow card) 70'	Report	Geis 20' (pen.), (yellow card) 78'; Højbjerg (yellow card) 66'	Stadium: Generali Arena; Attendance: 17,352; Referee: Carlos Clos Gómez (Spain)

26 November 2015 5	Schalke 04 (Germany)	1–0	(Cyprus) APOEL	Gelsenkirchen, Germany
19:00 CET (UTC+01:00)	Neustädter (yellow card) 80'; Choupo-Moting 86'	Report	Vinícius (yellow card) 50'; Carlão (yellow card) 62'	Stadium: Veltins-Arena; Attendance: 43,117; Referee: Andreas Ekberg (Sweden)

10 December 2015 6	Asteras Tripolis (Greece)	0–4	(Germany) Schalke 04	Tripoli, Greece
21:05 CET (UTC+01:00)		Report	Choupo-Moting (yellow card) 23', (goal) 37', 78'; Di Santo 29'; Højbjerg (yellow card) 85'; Meyer 86'	Stadium: Theodoros Kolokotronis Stadium; Attendance: 2,501; Referee: Liran Liany (Israel)

==== Knockout phase ====
===== Round of 32 =====
18 February 2016 First leg	Shakhtar Donetsk (Ukraine)	0–0	(Germany) Schalke 04	Lviv, Ukraine
21:05 CET (UTC+01:00)	Kucher (yellow card) 79' (yellow-red card) 86'; Gladkiy (yellow card) 84'	Report	Sané (yellow card) 77'	Stadium: Arena Lviv; Attendance: 23,615; Referee: Hüseyin Göçek (Turkey)

25 February 2016 Second leg	Schalke 04 (Germany)	0–3 (0–3 agg.)	(Ukraine) Shakhtar Donetsk	Gelsenkirchen, Germany
19:00 CET (UTC+01:00)	Goretzka (yellow card) 35'	Report	Ismaily (yellow card) 2'; Marlos 26', (yellow card) 53'; Stepanenko (yellow card) 32'; Taison (yellow card) 43'; Ferreyra 63'; Kovalenko 77'	Stadium: Veltins-Arena; Attendance: 45,308; Referee: Matej Jug (Slovenia)

== Team statistics ==
Competition	First match	Last match	Starting round	Final position	Record							
Competition	First match	Last match	Starting round	Final position	G	W	D	L	GF	GA	GD	Win %
Bundesliga	15 August 2015	14 May 2016	Matchday 1	5th Place	34	15	7	12	51	49	+2	44.12
DFB-Pokal	8 August 2015	28 October 2015	Round 1	Round 2	2	1	0	1	5	2	+3	50.00
Europa League	17 September 2015	25 February 2016	Group stage	Round of 32	8	4	3	1	15	6	+9	50.00
Total					44	20	10	14	71	57	+14	45.45
Updated: 14 May 2016

== Squad statistics ==
Squad Season 2015–16
No	NAT	Player	Age	Contract ends	All A	Goal	Yellow card	(yellow card) (red card)	Red card	BL A	BL	Yellow card	(yellow card) (red card)	Red card	Cup A	Cup	Yellow card	(yellow card) (red card)	Red card	EL A	EL	Yellow card	(yellow card) (red card)	Red card
Goalkeepers
1	Germany	Ralf Fährmann	27	30 June 2019	43 (0)	0	1	0	0	34 (0)	0	1	0	0	1 (0)	0	0	0	0	8 (0)	0	0	0	0
30	Austria	Michael Gspurning	35	30 June 2016	1 (0)	0	0	0	0	0 (0)	0	0	0	0	1 (0)	0	0	0	0	0 (0)	0	0	0	0
34	Germany	Fabian Giefer	25	30 June 2018	0 (0)	0	0	0	0	0 (0)	0	0	0	0	0 (0)	0	0	0	0	0 (0)	0	0	0	0
35	Germany	Alexander Nübel	19	30 June 2018	0 (1)	0	0	0	0	0 (1)	0	0	0	0	0 (0)	0	0	0	0	0 (0)	0	0	0	0
Defenders
2	Germany	Marvin Friedrich	20	30 June 2018	0 (3)	0	0	0	0	0 (2)	0	0	0	0	0 (0)	0	0	0	0	0 (1)	0	0	0	0
3	Brazil	Júnior Caiçara	27	30 June 2018	31 (1)	0	8	0	0	22 (1)	0	7	0	0	2 (0)	0	1	0	0	7 (0)	0	0	0	0
4	Germany	Benedikt Höwedes (C)	28	30 June 2020	14 (5)	1	4	0	0	10 (5)	1	4	0	0	1 (0)	0	0	0	0	3 (0)	0	0	0	0
6	Bosnia and Herzegovina	Sead Kolašinac	22	30 June 2017	24 (6)	1	5	0	0	18 (5)	1	5	0	0	1 (0)	0	0	0	0	5 (1)	0	0	0	0
15	Germany	Dennis Aogo	29	30 June 2017	25 (5)	0	4	0	0	20 (3)	0	4	0	0	2 (0)	0	0	0	0	3 (2)	0	0	0	0
20	Germany	Thilo Kehrer	19	30 June 2019	0 (1)	0	0	0	0	0 (1)	0	0	0	0	0 (0)	0	0	0	0	0 (0)	0	0	0	0
22	Japan	Atsuto Uchida	28	30 June 2018	0 (0)	0	0	0	0	0 (0)	0	0	0	0	0 (0)	0	0	0	0	0 (0)	0	0	0	0
24	Turkey	Kaan Ayhan	21	30 June 2017	2 (3)	0	0	0	0	0 (1)	0	0	0	0	0 (0)	0	0	0	0	2 (2)	0	0	0	0
27	Germany	Sascha Riether	33	30 June 2016	16 (4)	0	3	0	0	14 (3)	0	3	0	0	1 (0)	0	0	0	0	1 (1)	0	0	0	0
28	Brazil	Felipe Santana	30	30 June 2016	0 (0)	0	0	0	0	0 (0)	0	0	0	0	0 (0)	0	0	0	0	0 (0)	0	0	0	0
31	Serbia	Matija Nastasić	23	30 June 2019	2 (0)	1	0	0	0	1 (0)	0	0	0	0	1 (0)	1	0	0	0	0 (0)	0	0	0	0
32	Cameroon	Joël Matip	24	30 June 2016	41 (0)	4	2	0	0	34 (0)	3	2	0	0	2 (0)	0	0	0	0	5 (0)	1	0	0	0
Midfielders
5	Germany	Johannes Geis	22	30 June 2019	35 (2)	4	6	0	1	27 (1)	2	4	0	1	1 (0)	1	0	0	0	7 (1)	1	2	0	0
7	Germany	Max Meyer	20	30 June 2018	31 (10)	6	4	0	0	27 (5)	5	4	0	0	1 (1)	0	0	0	0	3 (4)	1	0	0	0
8	Germany	Leon Goretzka	21	30 June 2018	32 (2)	2	6	0	0	23 (2)	1	5	0	0	2 (0)	1	0	0	0	7 (0)	0	1	0	0
10	Germany	Julian Draxler	22	30 June 2018	4 (0)	1	1	0	0	3 (0)	1	1	0	0	1 (0)	0	0	0	0	0 (0)	0	0	0	0
11	Morocco	Younès Belhanda	26	30 June 2016	10 (7)	2	2	0	0	8 (7)	2	2	0	0	0 (0)	0	0	0	0	2 (0)	0	0	0	0
12	Germany	Marco Höger	26	30 June 2016	3 (3)	0	2	0	0	3 (2)	0	2	0	0	0 (0)	0	0	0	0	0 (1)	0	0	0	0
18	Germany	Sidney Sam	28	30 June 2018	1 (5)	0	0	0	0	0 (2)	0	0	0	0	0 (0)	0	0	0	0	1 (3)	0	0	0	0
19	Germany	Leroy Sané	20	30 June 2019	29 (13)	9	5	0	0	23 (10)	8	4	0	0	0 (2)	0	0	0	0	6 (1)	1	1	0	0
21	Austria	Alessandro Schöpf	22	30 June 2019	6 (9)	3	1	0	0	5 (8)	3	1	0	0	0 (0)	0	0	0	0	1 (1)	0	0	0	0
23	Denmark	Pierre-Emile Højbjerg	20	30 June 2016	17 (13)	0	7	0	0	13 (10)	0	3	0	0	0 (1)	0	1	0	0	4 (2)	0	3	0	0
33	Germany	Roman Neustädter	28	30 June 2016	33 (5)	0	5	0	0	26 (4)	0	4	0	0	0 (1)	0	0	0	0	7 (0)	0	1	0	0
—	Ghana	Kevin-Prince Boateng	29	30 June 2016	0 (0)	0	0	0	0	0 (0)	0	0	0	0	0 (0)	0	0	0	0	0 (0)	0	0	0	0
Forwards
9	Argentina	Franco Di Santo	27	30 June 2019	20 (14)	8	4	0	0	13 (12)	2	3	0	0	2 (0)	1	0	0	0	5 (2)	5	1	0	0
13	Cameroon	Eric M. Choupo-Moting	27	30 June 2017	27 (9)	9	2	0	0	21 (7)	6	1	0	0	1 (1)	0	0	0	0	5 (1)	3	1	0	0
16	Germany	Fabian Reese	18	30 June 2019	0 (1)	0	0	0	0	0 (1)	0	0	0	0	0 (0)	0	0	0	0	0 (0)	0	0	0	0
25	Netherlands	Klaas-Jan Huntelaar	32	30 June 2017	37 (3)	16	2	0	0	29 (2)	12	2	0	0	2 (0)	1	0	0	0	6 (1)	3	0	0	0
36	Germany	Felix Platte	20	30 June 2018	0 (1)	0	1	0	0	0 (1)	0	1	0	0	0 (0)	0	0	0	0	0 (0)	0	0	0	0
—	Germany	Felix Schröter	20	30 June 2018	0 (0)	0	0	0	0	0 (0)	0	0	0	0	0 (0)	0	0	0	0	0 (0)	0	0	0	0
Total					—	67	77	0	1	—	47	64	0	1	—	5	2	0	0	—	15	10	0	0
Last updated: 29 May 2016

Players in white left the club during the season.
