= 2010–11 FC Schalke 04 season =

Schalke 04 2010–11 football season

Schalke 04
2010–11 season
- President: Josef Schnusenberg
- Head coach: Felix Magath (until 16 March 2011); Ralf Rangnick (from 17 March 2011)
- Stadium: Veltins-Arena
- Bundesliga: 14th
- DFB-Pokal: Winners
- DFL-Supercup: Runners-up
- UEFA Champions League: Semi-finals
- Top goalscorer: League: Raúl (13); All: Raúl (19)
Home colours	Away colours	Third colours

The 2010–11 season of Schalke 04 began on 16 August 2010 with a DFB Pokal match against Aalen, and ended on 21 May 2011, the final of the DFB-Pokal, played against MSV Duisburg.

== Transfers ==
=== Summer transfers ===
In:

No.	Pos.	Nation	Player
2	DF	GHA	Hans Sarpei (from Bayer Leverkusen)
3	DF	ESP	Sergio Escudero (from Real Murcia)
5	DF	FRA	Nicolas Plestan (from Lille)
6	DF	GER	Tim Hoogland (from Mainz 05)
7	FW	ESP	Raúl (from Real Madrid)
14	DF	GRE	Kyriakos Papadopoulos (from Olympiacos)
18	MF	ESP	José Manuel Jurado (from Atlético Madrid)
21	DF	GER	Christoph Metzelder (from Real Madrid)
22	DF	JPN	Atsuto Uchida (from Kashima Antlers)
25	FW	NED	Klaas-Jan Huntelaar (from Milan)
26	FW	SVK	Erik Jendrišek (from 1. FC Kaiserslautern)
27	MF	ROU	Ciprian Deac (from CFR Cluj)
36	GK	GER	Lars Unnerstall (from Schalke 04 II)
38	FW	GER	Marvin Pourie (loan return from TuS Koblenz)

Out:

No.	Pos.	Nation	Player
2	DF	GER	Heiko Westermann (to Hamburger SV)
3	DF	NOR	Tore Reginiussen (on loan to Lecce)
5	DF	BRA	Marcelo Bordon (to Al Rayyan)
7	MF	GER	Lewis Holtby (on loan to Mainz 05, previously on loan at VfL Bochum)
8	MF	BRA	Mineiro (released)
14	FW	GER	Gerald Asamoah (to St. Pauli)
15	MF	BRA	Zé Roberto (to Vasco da Gama)
16	MF	CZE	Jan Morávek (on loan to 1. FC Kaiserslautern)
18	DF	BRA	Rafinha (to Genoa)
21	MF	URU	Carlos Grossmüller (released, previously on loan at Danubio)
22	FW	GER	Kevin Kurányi (to Dynamo Moscow)
23	MF	TUR	Emin Yalin (Göztepe)
25	DF	PER	Carlos Zambrano (on loan to FC St. Pauli)
27	FW	URU	Vicente Sánchez (to América)
35	GK	GER	Mohamed Amsif (to FC Augsburg)

=== Winter transfers ===
In:

No.	Pos.	Nation	Player
10	MF	IRI	Ali Karimi (from Steel Azin)
15	FW	GRE	Angelos Charisteas (from Arles-Avignon)
23	DF	BRA	Danilo Avelar (on loan from Karpaty Lviv)
31	MF	GER	Julian Draxler (from Schalke 04 U-19)
40	MF	GHA	Anthony Annan (from Rosenborg)
43	DF	NOR	Tore Reginiussen (loan return from Lecce)

Out:

No.	Pos.	Nation	Player
10	MF	CRO	Ivan Rakitić (to Sevilla)
23	MF	USA	Jermaine Jones (on loan to Blackburn Rovers)
26	FW	SVK	Erik Jendrišek (to SC Freiburg)
34	FW	MKD	Besart Ibraimi (to Sevastopol)
40	MF	SRB	Predrag Stevanović (to Werder Bremen)
43	DF	NOR	Tore Reginiussen (on loan to Tromsø)
—	DF	GER	Bahadir Incilli (to Fortuna Düsseldorf II)
—	MF	CAN	Massih Wassey (to Fortuna Düsseldorf II)

== Goals and appearances ==
No.	Pos	Nat	Player	Total		Bundesliga		UEFA Champions League		DFB-Pokal	
No.	Pos	Nat	Player	Apps	Goals	Apps	Goals	Apps	Goals	Apps	Goals
1	GK	(Germany) GER	Manuel Neuer	52	0	34	0	12	0	6	0
2	DF	(Ghana) GHA	Hans Sarpei	17	0	6+3	0	4+2	0	2	0
3	DF	(Spain) ESP	Sergio Escudero	12	0	5+1	0	3+1	0	1+1	0
4	DF	(Germany) GER	Benedikt Höwedes	46	4	30	1	10	2	6	1
5	DF	(France) FRA	Nicolas Plestan	4	0	3	0	1	0	0	0
6	DF	(Germany) GER	Tim Hoogland	0	0	0	0	0	0	0	0
13	DF	(Germany) GER	Lukas Schmitz	36	0	21+2	0	5+3	0	3+2	0
14	DF	(Greece) GRE	Kyriakos Papadopoulos	30	0	10+8	0	6+1	0	2+3	0
21	DF	(Germany) GER	Christoph Metzelder	47	1	32	1	10	0	5	0
22	DF	(Japan) JPN	Atsuto Uchida	42	0	24+2	0	11	0	4+1	0
23	DF	(Brazil) BRA	Danilo Avelar	3	0	2+1	0	0	0	0	0
24	DF	(Germany) GER	Christian Pander	5	0	1+3	0	0	0	1	0
32	DF	(Cameroon) CMR	Joël Matip	41	1	14+12	0	6+5	1	1+3	0
35	DF	(Germany) GER	Frank Fahrenhorst	0	0	0	0	0	0	0	0
39	DF	(Germany) GER	Marvin Pachan	0	0	0	0	0	0	0	0
43	DF	(Norway) NOR	Tore Reginiussen	0	0	0	0	0	0	0	0
10	MF	(Croatia) CRO	Ivan Rakitić	25	2	14+2	1	4+1	0	4	1
10	MF	(Iran) IRI	Ali Karimi	2	0	0+1	0	0+1	0	0	0
11	MF	(Germany) GER	Alexander Baumjohann	13	0	3+6	0	4	0	0	0
12	MF	(Germany) GER	Peer Kluge	34	1	18+4	1	5+3	0	4	0
18	MF	(Spain) ESP	José Manuel Jurado	44	8	21+7	3	11	3	4+1	2
20	MF	(Greece) GRE	Vasileios Pliatsikas	1	0	1	0	0	0	0	0
23	MF	(United States) USA	Jermaine Jones	16	1	10	1	3+1	0	2	0
27	MF	(Romania) ROU	Ciprian Deac	5	0	2	0	1+2	0	0	0
28	MF	(Germany) GER	Christoph Moritz	17	0	8+4	0	2+1	0	1+1	0
30	MF	(Georgia (country)) GEO	Levan Kenia	0	0	0	0	0	0	0	0
31	MF	(Germany) GER	Julian Draxler	24	3	3+12	1	1+5	0	1+2	2
40	MF	(Ghana) GHA	Anthony Annan	10	0	8+1	0	0	0	1	0
41	MF	(Germany) GER	Danny Latza	0	0	0	0	0	0	0	0
7	FW	(Spain) ESP	Raúl	50	19	34	13	12	5	4	1
8	FW	(China) CHN	Hao Junmin	10	0	2+4	0	0+2	0	1+1	0
9	FW	(Brazil) BRA	Edu	39	5	15+13	3	3+5	2	2+1	0
15	FW	(Greece) GRE	Angelos Charisteas	5	1	1+3	1	0+1	0	0	0
17	FW	(Peru) PER	Jefferson Farfán	44	10	26+2	3	10	4	6	3
19	FW	(Switzerland) SUI	Mario Gavranović	10	2	4+4	0	1	1	1	1
25	FW	(Netherlands) NED	Klaas-Jan Huntelaar	35	13	22+2	8	7+1	3	3	2
26	FW	(Slovakia) SVK	Erik Jendrišek	5	0	0+3	0	0+1	0	1	0
37	FW	(Germany) GER	Marco Quotschalla	1	0	0	0	0	0	0+1	0

Last Updated: 21 May 2011

== Competitions ==
=== Bundesliga ===
==== League table ====
Pos	Team	Pld	W	D	L	GF	GA	GD	Pts	Qualification or relegation
12	VfB Stuttgart	34	12	6	16	60	59	+1	42	
13	Werder Bremen	34	10	11	13	47	61	−14	41	
14	Schalke 04	34	11	7	16	38	44	−6	40	Qualification to Europa League play-off round (Note: Schalke 04 as winners of the 2010–11 DFB-Pokal qualified for the play-off round of the 2011–12 UEFA Europa League.)
15	VfL Wolfsburg	34	9	11	14	43	48	−5	38	
16	Borussia Mönchengladbach (O)	34	10	6	18	48	65	−17	36	Qualification to relegation play-offs

Source: kicker
Rules for classification: 1) points; 2) goal difference; 3) number of goals scored.
(O) Play-off winners

==== Matches ====
Win Draw Loss

Note: Results are given with Schalke 04 score listed first.

Game	Date	Venue	Opponent	Result F–A	Attendance	Schalke Goalscorers
1	21 August 2010	A	Hamburger SV	1–2	57,000	Farfán 80'
2	28 August 2010	H	Hannover 96	1–2	61,226	Jones 82'
3	10 September 2010	A	1899 Hoffenheim	0–2	30,150	
4	17 September 2010	H	Borussia Dortmund	1–3	60,069	Huntelaar 89'
5	22 September 2010	A	SC Freiburg	2–1	24,000	Rakitić 9', Huntelaar 87'
6	25 September 2010	H	Borussia Mönchengladbach	2–2	61,000	Huntelaar 51', Raúl 87'
7	2 October 2010	A	1. FC Nürnberg	1–2	48,548	Huntelaar 74'
8	16 October 2010	H	VfB Stuttgart	2–2	60,000	Edu 29', Huntelaar 80' (pen.)
9	23 October 2010	A	Eintracht Frankfurt	0–0	50,000	
10	30 October 2010	H	Bayer Leverkusen	0–1	61,673	
11	5 November 2010	H	FC St. Pauli	3–0	61,673	Raúl 14', 81', Huntelaar 53'
12	13 November 2010	A	VfL Wolfsburg	2–2	30,000	Edu 39', Huntelaar 75'
13	20 November 2010	H	Werder Bremen	4–0	61,673	Metzelder 22', Raúl 45+2', 56', 71'
14	27 November 2010	A	1. FC Kaiserslautern	0–5	49,474	
15	4 December 2010	H	Bayern Munich	2–0	61,673	Jurado 58', Höwedes 67'
16	12 December 2010	A	Mainz 05	1–0	20,300	Farfán 30'
17	18 December 2010	H	1. FC Köln	3–0	61,000	Raúl 30', 50', 87'
18	15 January 2011	H	Hamburger SV	0–1	61,673	
19	22 January 2011	A	Hannover 96	1–0	49,000	Raúl 33'
20	29 January 2011	H	1899 Hoffenheim	0–1	60,569	
21	4 February 2011	A	Borussia Dortmund	0–0	80,720	
22	12 February 2011	H	SC Freiburg	1–0	60,439	Farfán 49'
23	20 February 2011	A	Borussia Mönchengladbach	1–2	51,592	Kluge 2'
24	26 February 2011	H	1. FC Nürnberg	1–1	61,000	Raúl 52'
25	5 March 2011	A	VfB Stuttgart	0–1	40,000	
26	12 March 2011	H	Eintracht Frankfurt	2–1	61,673	Jurado 45+1' (pen.), Charisteas 84'
27	20 March 2011	A	Bayer Leverkusen	0–2	30,210	
28	1 April 2011	A	FC St. Pauli	2–0^{1}	24,487	Raúl 26', Draxler 66'
29	9 April 2011	H	VfL Wolfsburg	1–0	61,673	Jurado 76'
30	16 April 2011	A	Werder Bremen	1–1	40,500	Edu 63'
31	23 April 2011	H	1. FC Kaiserslautern	0–1	61,673	
32	30 April 2011	A	Bayern Munich	1–4	69,000	Badstuber 7' (o.g.)
33	7 May 2011	H	Mainz 05	1–3	61,673	Huntelaar 47'
34	14 May 2011	A	1. FC Köln	1–2	50,000	Raúl 87'

Notes

^1 The match on 1 April against St. Pauli was suspended in the 87th minute after an assistant referee was hit by a beer cup thrown from the stands with the score at 2–0 for Schalke. The DFB Sports Court awarded the match to Schalke maintaining the 2–0 scoreline as well as the goalscorers and disciplinary records.

=== UEFA Champions League ===
==== Group stage ====
Pos	Team	Pld	W	D	L	GF	GA	GD	Pts	Qualification	SCH	LYO	BEN	HTA
1	(Germany) Schalke 04	6	4	1	1	10	3	+7	13	Advance to knockout phase	—	3–0	2–0	3–1
2	(France) Lyon	6	3	1	2	11	10	+1	10	Advance to knockout phase	1–0	—	2–0	2–2
3	(Portugal) Benfica	6	2	0	4	7	12	−5	6	Transfer to Europa League	1–2	4–3	—	2–0
4	(Israel) Hapoel Tel Aviv	6	1	2	3	7	10	−3	5		0–0	1–3	3–0	—

Source: Soccerway

==== Matches ====
Win Draw Loss

Note: Results are given with FC Schalke 04 score listed first.

Game	Date	Venue	Opponent	Result F–A	Attendance	Schalke 04 Goalscorers
1	14 September 2010	A	Olympique Lyonnais	0–1	35,552	
2	29 September 2010	H	Benfica	2–0	50,436	Farfán 73', Huntelaar 85'
3	20 October 2010	H	Hapoel Tel Aviv	3–1	50,900	Raúl 3', 58', Jurado 68'
4	2 November 2010	A	Hapoel Tel Aviv	0–0	13,094	
5	24 November 2010	H	Olympique Lyonnais	3–0	51,132	Farfán 13', Huntelaar 20', 89'
6	7 December 2010	A	Benfica	2–1	23,348	Jurado 19', Höwedes 81'
R16	15 February 2011	A	Valencia	1–1	42,000	Raúl 64'
R16	9 March 2011	H	Valencia	3–1	53,517	Farfán 40', 90+4', Gavranović 52'
QF	6 April 2011	A	Internazionale	5–2	80,000	Matip 17', Edu 40', 75', Raúl 53', Ranocchia 57' (o.g.)
QF	13 April 2011	H	Internazionale	2–1	53,517	Raúl 45', Höwedes 81'
SF	26 April 2011	H	Manchester United	0–2	54,142	
SF	4 May 2011	A	Manchester United	1–4	74,678	Jurado 35'

=== DFB-Pokal ===
==== Matches ====
Win Draw Loss

Note: Results are given with FC Schalke 04 score listed first.

Game	Date	Venue	Opponent	Result F–A	Attendance	Schalke 04 Goalscorers
1	16 August 2010	A	VfR Aalen	2–1	13,452	Farfán 42', 47'
2	26 October 2010	A	FSV Frankfurt	1–0	10,470	Jurado 12'
3	21 December 2010	A	FC Augsburg	1–0	30,660	Farfán 84'
QF	25 January 2011	H	1. FC Nürnberg	3–2 (a.e.t.)	49,191	Gavranović 14', Rakitić 58', Draxler 119'
SF	2 March 2011	A	Bayern Munich	1–0	69,000	Raúl 15'
F	21 May 2011	N	MSV Duisburg	5–0	75,708	Draxler 18', Huntelaar 22', 70', Höwedes 42', Jurado 55'

==== Final ====
21 May 2011 Final	MSV Duisburg	0–5	Schalke 04	Olympiastadion, Berlin
20:00 CEST		Report	Draxler 18'; Huntelaar 22', 70'; Höwedes 42'; Jurado 55'	Attendance: 75,708; Referee: Wolfgang Stark (Ergolding)

== Kits ==
Home	Home Alternate	Away	Third	Cup Final

Type	Shirt	Shorts	Socks	First appearance / Info
Home	Blue	White	Blue / White	
Home Alt.	Blue	Blue	Blue / White	Bundesliga, Match 19, January 22 against Hannover
Away	Marine	Marine	Marine	
Third	White	White	White	
Cup Final	Ultrabeauty	Navy	Navy	2011 DFB-Pokal Final → 2011–12 Third Kit

== See also ==
- 2010–11 Bundesliga
- 2010–11 DFB-Pokal
- FC Schalke 04
