= Benedikt Höwedes =

German association football player

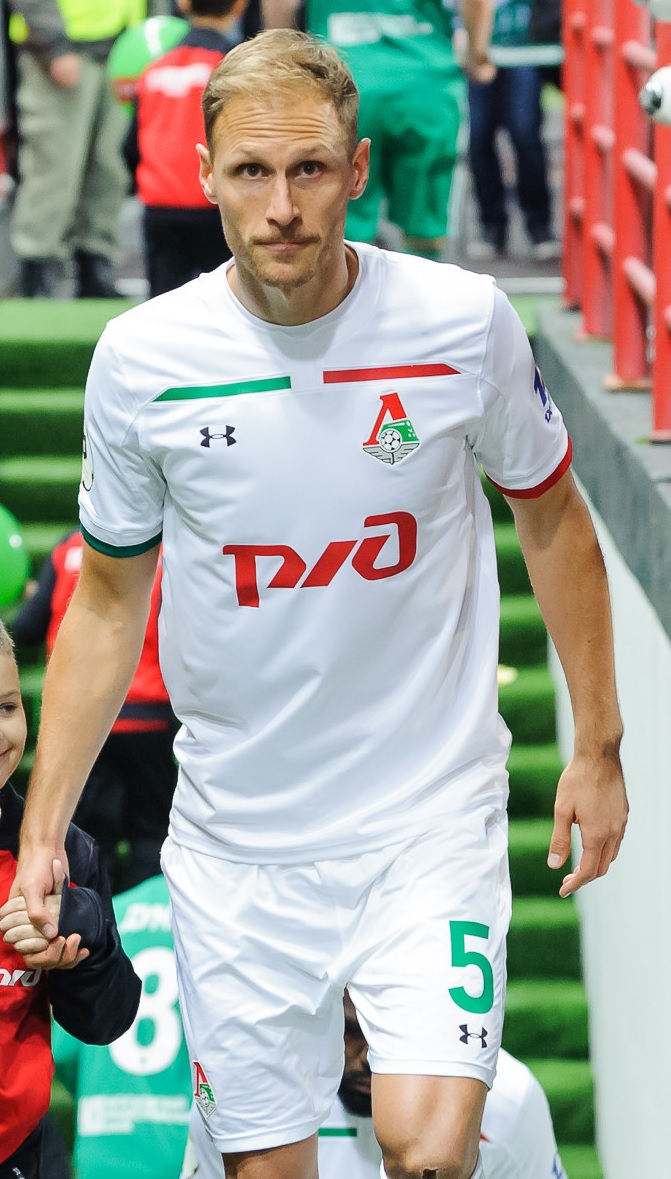
- Höwedes with Lokomotiv Moscow in 2018

Personal information
- Full name: Benedikt Höwedes
- Date of birth: 29 February 1988 (age 38)
- Place of birth: Haltern, West Germany
- Height: 1.88 m (6 ft 2 in)
- Position: Defender

Team information
- Current team: Germany (assistant)

Youth career
- 1994–2000: TuS Haltern
- 2000–2001: SG Herten-Langenbochum
- 2001–2007: Schalke 04

Senior career*
Years	Team	Apps	(Gls)
2007–2009	Schalke 04 II	15	(0)
2007–2018	Schalke 04	240	(12)
2017–2018	→ Juventus (loan)	3	(1)
2018–2020	Lokomotiv Moscow	35	(3)
Total		293	(16)

International career
2005–2006	Germany U18	3	(0)
2006–2007	Germany U19	16	(0)
2007	Germany U20	1	(0)
2007–2010	Germany U21	22	(3)
2011–2017	Germany	44	(2)

Managerial career
- 2021–: Germany (assistant)
Medal record
Men's football
Representing Germany
FIFA World Cup
Winner	2014 Brazil	Team
UEFA European Championship
Bronze medal – third place	2012 Poland–Ukraine	Team
UEFA European Under-21 Championship
Winner	2009 Sweden	Team
- * Club domestic league appearances and goals

Benedikt Höwedes (born 29 February 1988) is a German former professional footballer who played as a defender. He spent the majority of his playing career for Schalke 04, which he captained for six seasons, and represented the Germany national football team from 2011 to 2017. At international level, Höwedes won the World Cup with Germany in 2014, and was one of only three players to play every single minute of the tournament. Höwedes described himself as a 'multi-functional player' in the defence, who can play in the centre or as both a left or right-sided full back.

== Club career ==
=== Schalke ===
Höwedes started playing football for his hometown club TuS Haltern in 1994. In 2001, he was transferred to the youth teams of FC Schalke 04. In 2003, he became captain of Schalke's under-19 team and as a member of that team he won the Under 19 Bundesliga in 2006.

In September 2007, the German Football Association honoured Höwedes with the Fritz Walter Medal as the best player of his age-group for the 2006–07 season.

In January 2007, he signed a professional contract with Schalke, which ran until 30 June 2010, he then joined Schalke's Bundesliga squad in July. Until October 2007, however, he only played for Schalke's second team in the Oberliga (fourth division).

Höwedes' first professional match was in the Champions League on 3 October 2007.

On 10 December 2008, Höwedes extended his contract which will keep him at the club until 30 June 2014. On 23 July 2011, Höwedes became captain of Schalke. On 9 March 2013, Höwedes extended his contract with Schalke, until 30 June 2017.

In May 2016, Höwedes was part of a collaboration between the German Football Association and The LEGO Group, who released a Europe-exclusive collectible minifigure series, with Höwedes featured as the fifth of sixteen minifigures in the collection.

==== Loan to Juventus ====
On 30 August 2017, Höwedes joined Juventus on a one-year loan deal for €3.5 million plus €3 million variables, with an option to buy for €13M. On 26 November, Höwedes made his Serie A and Juventus debut, in a 3–0 home win over Crotone. On 15 April 2018, he scored his first goal for Juventus in a 3–0 home win over Sampdoria. This was only his second appearance for the club, as his time in Italy was affected by numerous injuries.

=== Lokomotiv Moscow ===
On 29 July 2018, Höwedes left Schalke to join Lokomotiv Moscow. Lokomotiv announced the signing of a 4-year contract with Höwedes on 31 July 2018. On 7 October 2018, he scored his first goal for Lokomotiv late in a game against PFC CSKA Moscow, giving his team a 1–0 victory.

On 8 June 2020, his contract with Lokomotiv was terminated by mutual consent as he decided to return to Germany for family reasons.

=== Retirement ===
On 31 July 2020, Höwedes announced his retirement from professional football. Overall he played more than 275 top-flight matches in Germany, Italy and Russia.

== International career ==
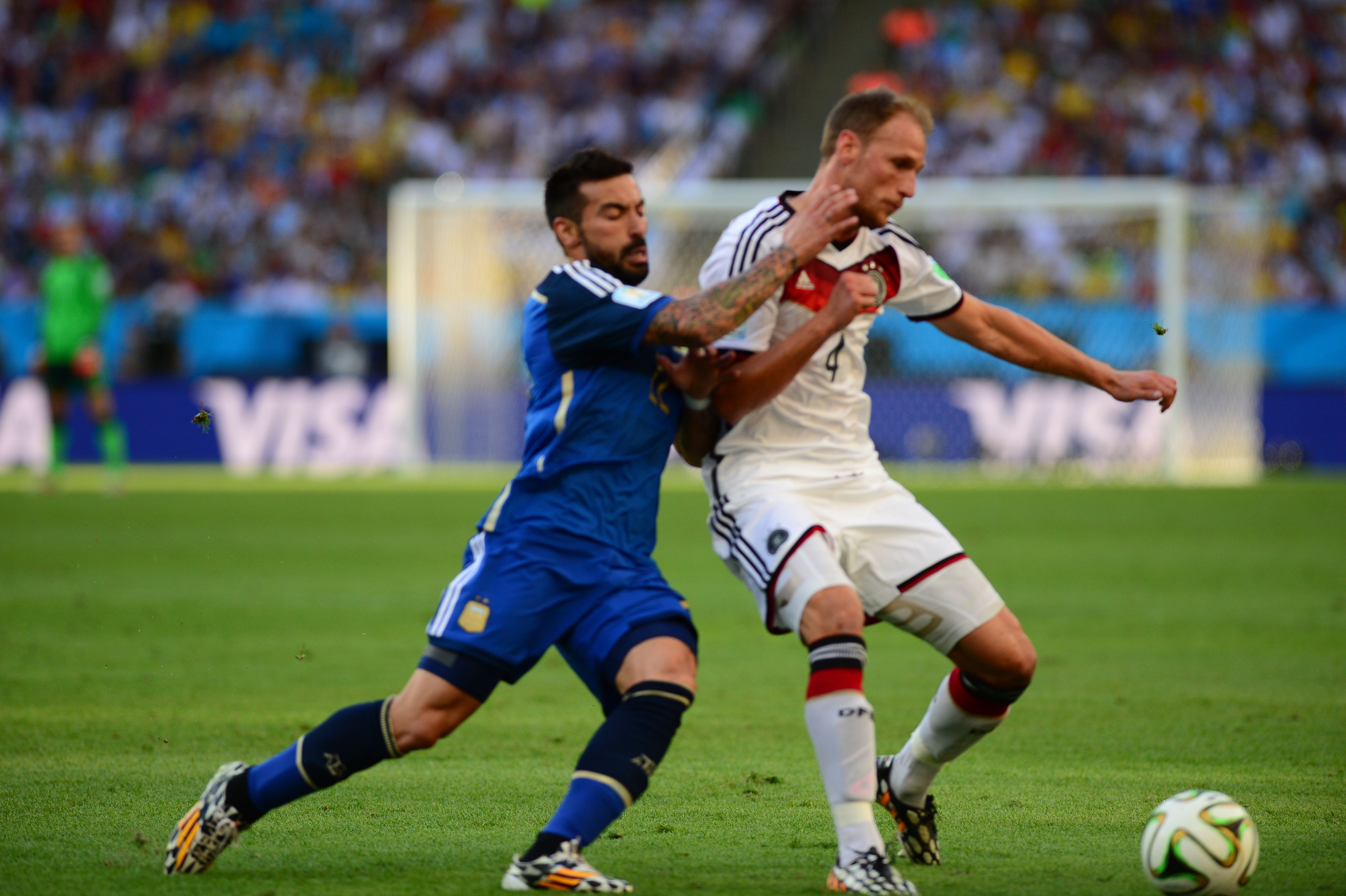
Höwedes challenging Ezequiel Lavezzi in the 2014 FIFA World Cup Final

Höwedes played for the under-18 team and under-19 team and appeared in all matches up to and including the semi-final at the 2007 UEFA European Under-19 Championship. On 5 September 2007, he made his first and only under-20 team appearance, due to the fact that he was turning out for the under-21 team on a regular basis.

He was a member of the squad which won the 2009 UEFA European Under-21 Championship and started in Germany's 4–0 win against England in the final.

On 29 May 2011, he made his debut for the senior team in a friendly against Uruguay. On 7 June 2011, he played his first official match against Azerbaijan in UEFA Euro 2012 qualifying, Germany won the match 3–1, with Höwedes setting up the first goal, which was scored by Mesut Özil.

Höwedes was selected for the German squad for UEFA Euro 2012 but did not make an appearance in the tournament. On 15 August 2012, he scored his first goal in a 1–3 friendly defeat at home against Argentina.

After making three appearances during the 2014 FIFA World Cup qualification, Höwedes was named in Germany's squad for the tournament finals. He was named in the starting line-up at left back against Portugal in the team's opening match, making his tournament debut. Later on, he won the tournament, along with his team. In the 2014 World Cup final, Höwedes went close to opening the scoring by hitting the goalpost with a header after a corner kick in the last seconds of the first half. Höwedes was also one of three German players who played every minute of all seven World Cup games, alongside goalkeeper Manuel Neuer and captain Philipp Lahm.

He won his last cap in March 2017. Benedikt Höwedes appeared 44 times for the DFB premium team.

== Managerial career ==
In August 2021, it was announced that Höwedes will begin a trainee program containing the tasks of the Germany national football team's managerial position accompanying his UEFA master's degree. The program is scheduled to last until the 2022 FIFA World Cup.

== Style of play ==
A large, versatile, reliable, and tenacious defender, Höwedes was considered a defensive all-rounder, as he could be deployed in any defensive position. Höwedes's main playing position was at centre back, but he could also be deployed as a right or left-sided full back and as a right or left-sided wing-back, which were the main positions that Höwedes was deployed in under Jens Keller. In the early phase of his youth career, Höwedes mainly played as a defensive midfielder; after joining Schalke, however, with whom he began his professional football career, he played mainly as a left-back. Höwedes's main defensive strengths lay in his ability to win his oppositional one-on-one duels consistently, his fine heading ability, and his no-nonsense style of play. Höwedes's height and high-jumping ability also made him an aerial threat, and saw him both score and set-up goals with his head. Additionally, Höwedes was also known for his well-timed sliding tackles and standing tackles, as well as his good first-time passing, technique, positional sense, and great physical strength. Despite his ability as a defender, he often struggled with injuries throughout his career.

== Career statistics ==
=== Club ===
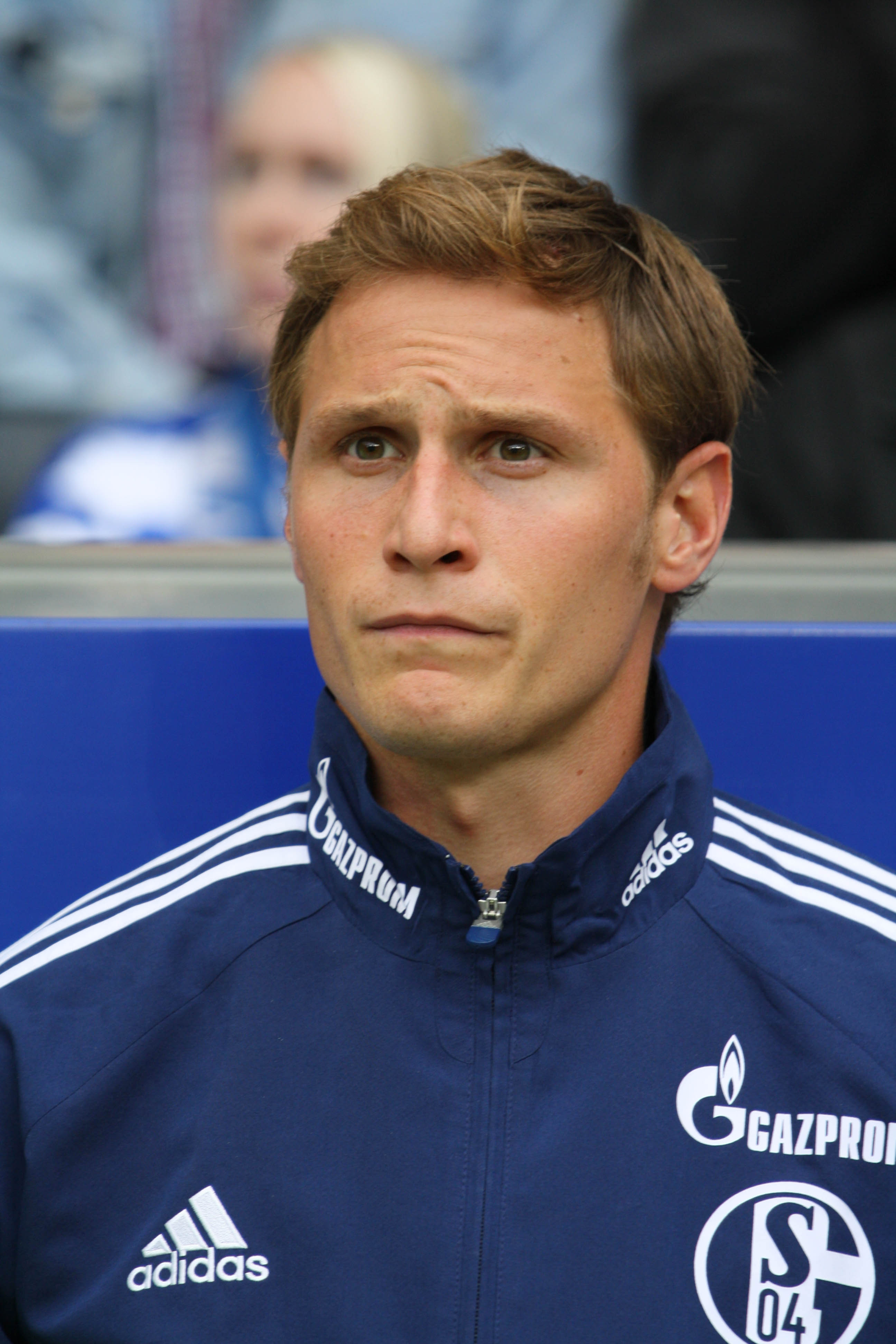
Höwedes with Schalke in 2011

Appearances and goals by club, season and competition
Club	Season	League			National cup (Note: Includes DFB-Pokal, Coppa Italia, Russian Cup)		Europe		Other		Total	
Club	Season	Division	Apps	Goals	Apps	Goals	Apps	Goals	Apps	Goals	Apps	Goals
Schalke 04 II	2006–07	Oberliga Westfalen	1	0	—		—		—		1	0
Schalke 04 II	2007–08	Oberliga Westfalen	13	0	—		—		—		13	0
Schalke 04 II	2008–09	Regionalliga West	1	0	—		—		—		1	0
Schalke 04 II	Total		15	0	—		—		—		15	0
Schalke 04	2007–08	Bundesliga	6	0	0	0	3 (Note: Appearances in UEFA Champions League)	0	—		9	0
Schalke 04	2008–09	Bundesliga	24	2	2	0	7	0	—		33	2
Schalke 04	2009–10	Bundesliga	33	3	5	3	—		—		38	6
Schalke 04	2010–11	Bundesliga	30	1	6	1	10	2	1 (Note: Appearance in DFL-Supercup)	0	47	4
Schalke 04	2011–12	Bundesliga	22	1	3	0	8 (Note: Appearances in UEFA Europa League)	0	1	0	34	1
Schalke 04	2012–13	Bundesliga	32	0	3	0	8	2	—		43	2
Schalke 04	2013–14	Bundesliga	19	1	3	1	10	0	—		32	2
Schalke 04	2014–15	Bundesliga	28	2	0	0	6	1	—		34	3
Schalke 04	2015–16	Bundesliga	15	1	1	0	3	0	—		19	1
Schalke 04	2016–17	Bundesliga	31	1	4	0	11	1	—		46	2
Schalke 04	Total		240	12	27	5	66	6	2	0	335	23
Juventus	2017–18	Serie A	3	1	0	0	0	0	—		3	1
Lokomotiv Moscow	2018–19	Russian Premier League	17	3	4	1	5	0	0	0	26	4
Lokomotiv Moscow	2019–20	Russian Premier League	18	0	0	0	6	0	0	0	24	0
Lokomotiv Moscow	Total		35	3	4	1	11	0	0	0	50	4
Career total			293	16	31	6	77	6	2	0	403	28

=== International ===
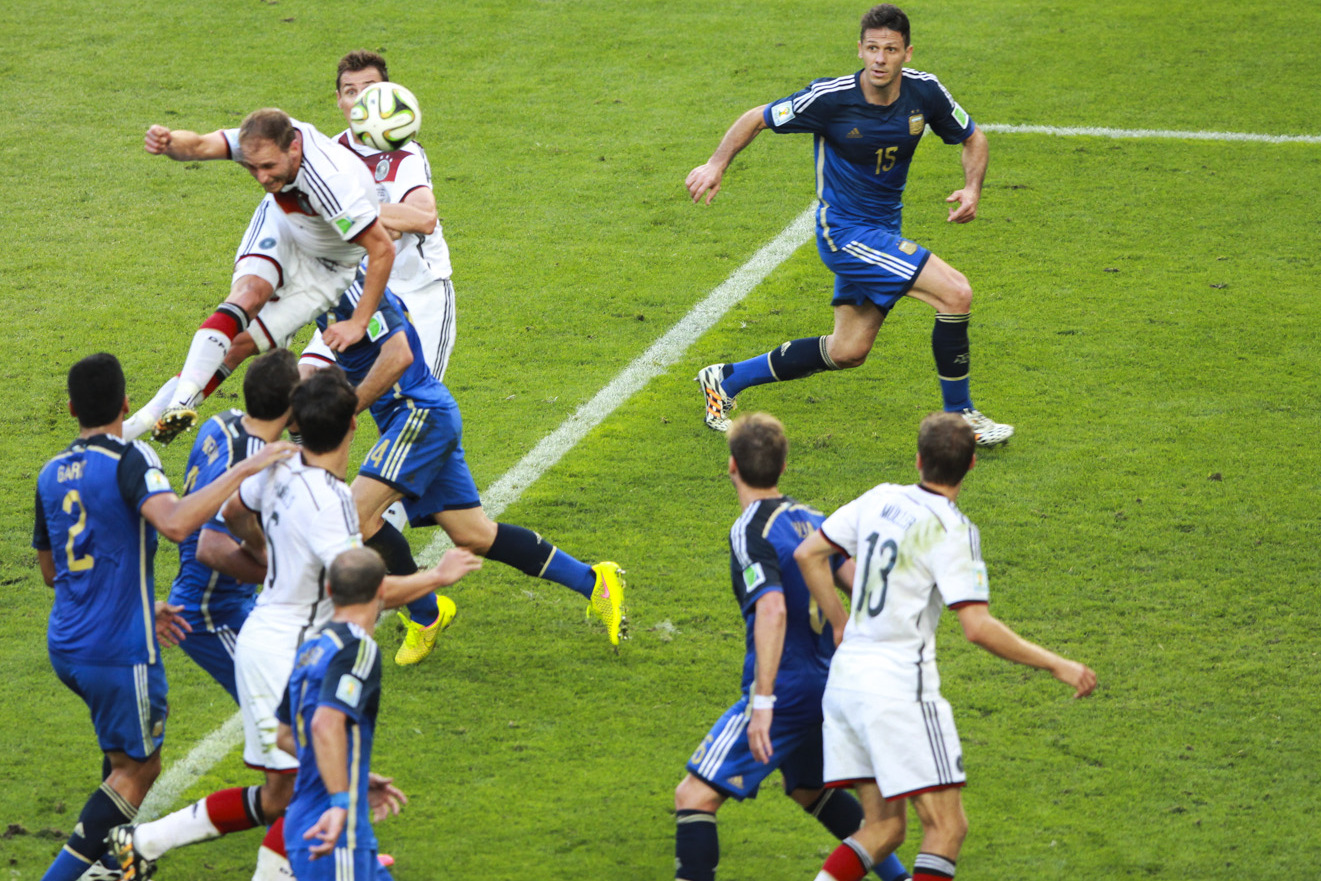
Höwedes with a header that hit the post in the 45th minute of the 2014 FIFA World Cup Final against Argentina

Ref.:

Germany
Year	App.	Goals
2011	6	0
2012	4	1
2013	8	0
2014	13	1
2015	1	0
2016	11	0
2017	1	0
Total	44	2

Scores and results lists Germany's goal tally first:

#	Date	Venue	Opponent	Score	Result	Competition
1.	15 August 2012	Commerzbank-Arena, Frankfurt, Germany	Argentina	1–3	1–3	Friendly
2.	6 June 2014	Coface Arena, Mainz, Germany	Armenia	3–1	6–1	Friendly

== Honours ==
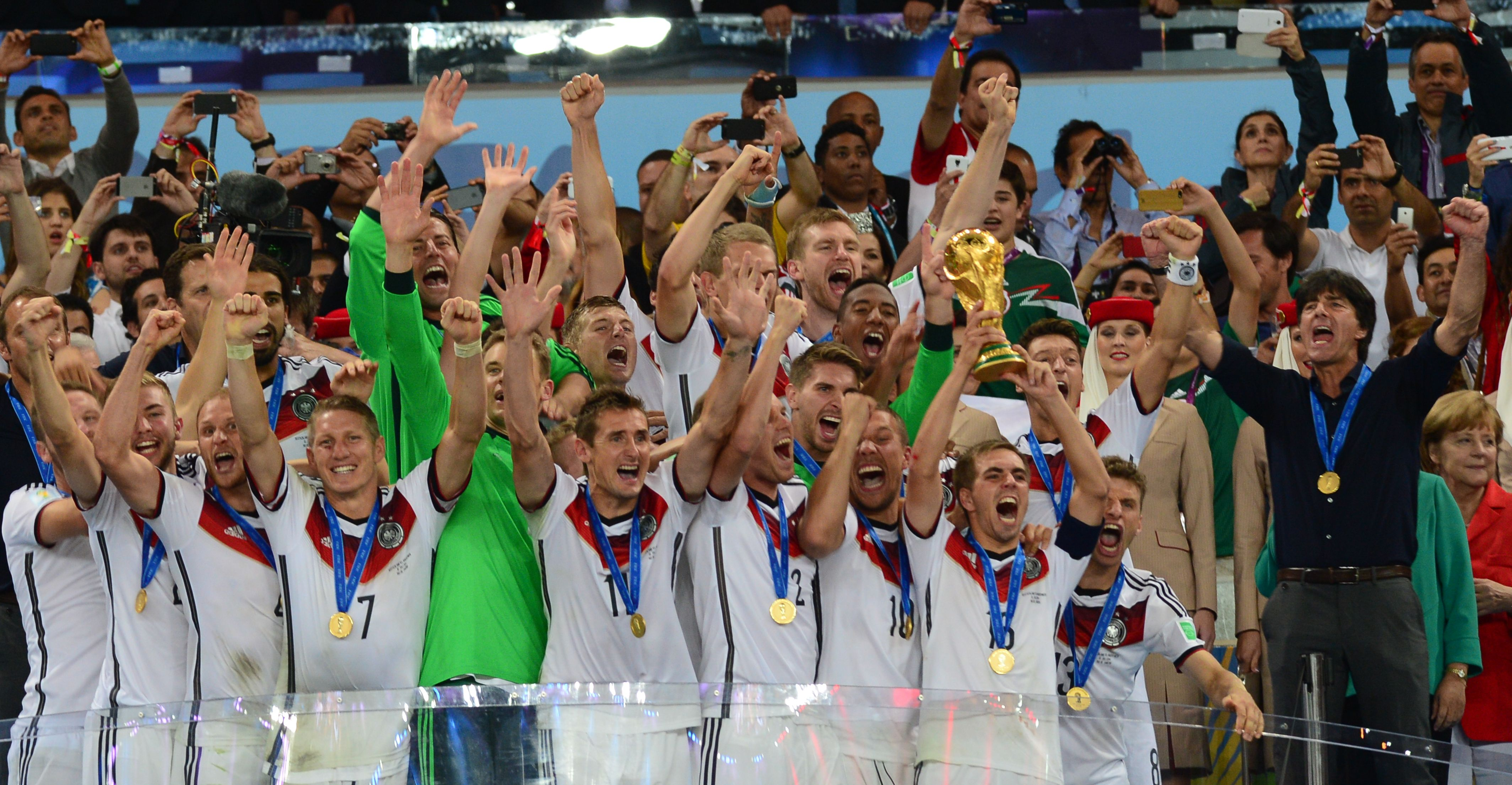
Höwedes (front, third left) celebrates winning the 2014 World Cup with the Germany national team

Schalke 04

- DFB-Pokal: 2010–11
- DFL-Supercup: 2011

Juventus

- Serie A: 2017–18
- Coppa Italia: 2017–18

Lokomotiv Moscow

- Russian Cup: 2018–19

Germany U21

- UEFA European Under-21 Championship: 2009

Germany

- FIFA World Cup: 2014

Individual

- Fritz Walter Medal U19 Gold Medal: 2007

== Personal life ==
Höwedes was born in Haltern, North Rhine-Westphalia, and he attended Gesamtschule Berger Feld.

He is married to childhood sweetheart; Lisa Wesseler and together they have one son; Bas who was born in October 2018.
