= Joël Matip =

Cameroon international footballer (born 1991)

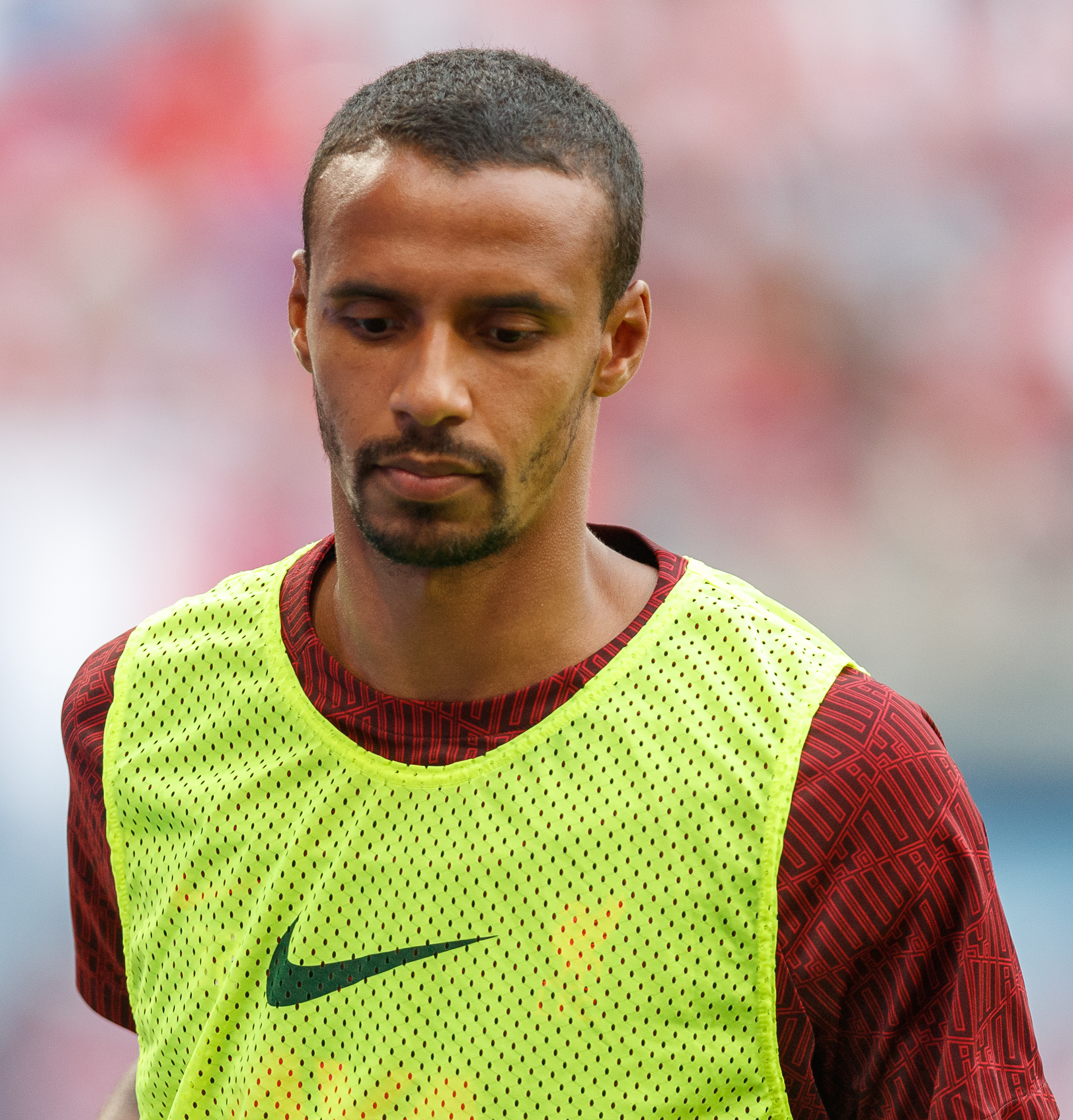
- Matip warming up for Liverpool in 2022

Personal information
- Full name: Joël André Matip Job
- Date of birth: 8 August 1991 (age 35)
- Place of birth: Bochum, Germany
- Height: 1.95 m (6 ft 5 in)
- Position: Centre-back

Youth career
- 1995–1997: SC Weitmar 45
- 1997–2000: VfL Bochum
- 2000–2009: Schalke 04

Senior career*
Years	Team	Apps	(Gls)
2009–2011	Schalke 04 II	4	(1)
2009–2016	Schalke 04	194	(17)
2016–2024	Liverpool	150	(9)
Total		348	(27)

International career
2010–2015	Cameroon	27	(1)
- * Club domestic league appearances and goals

Joël André Matip Job (born 8 August 1991) is a former professional footballer who played as a centre back.

Matip began his professional career with Schalke 04 in 2009, and was part of their teams that won the DFB-Pokal and DFL-Supercup in 2011. He totalled 258 competitive appearances and 23 goals before moving to Liverpool on a free transfer in 2016, where he won the UEFA Champions League in 2019, starting in the final. He also won the 2019 UEFA Super Cup and the 2019–20 Premier League.

Born and raised in Germany, Matip represented Cameroon at international level. He played for them at the 2010 Africa Cup of Nations and the FIFA World Cups of 2010 and 2014, before announcing his international retirement in 2015.

== Club career ==
=== Early career ===
Matip began his career with SC Weitmar 45 before joining VfL Bochum in 1997. After three years in VfL Bochum's youth teams, Matip was scouted by Schalke 04 in July 2000.

=== Schalke 04 ===
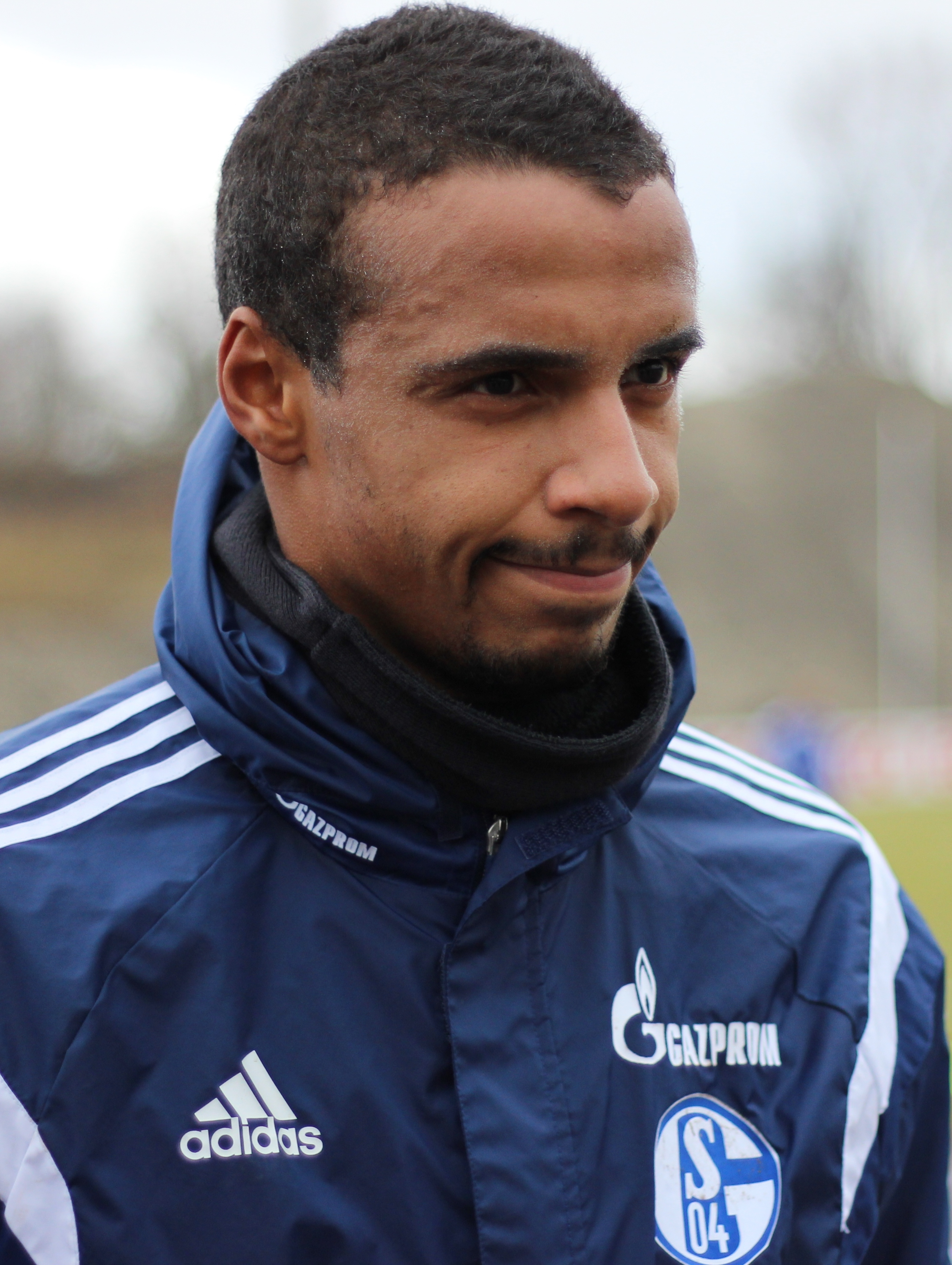
Matip with Schalke 04 in 2015

Matip made his debut on 27 October 2009 in a Regionalliga West match against 1. FC Saarbrücken. He made his Bundesliga debut for Schalke on 7 November 2009 against Bayern Munich, in which he scored the game-tying goal and was subsequently named man of the match. After his successful introduction to the first team, Matip remained a regular starter for Schalke in defensive midfield for the remainder of the 2009–10 season, scoring two further goals against 1. FC Köln and Eintracht Frankfurt. On 2 March 2010, Matip signed a three-and-a-half-year contract with Schalke 04.

In the 2010–11 season, Matip made his UEFA Champions League debut as Schalke reached the semi-finals of the competition for the first time in the club's history. On 5 April 2011, he scored his first Champions League goal in Schalke's 5–2 quarter final win against title holders Inter Milan at San Siro. On 21 May 2011, Matip appeared as a 72nd-minute substitute in Schalke's 5–0 2011 DFB-Pokal Final win over MSV Duisburg at the Olympiastadion.

On 23 February 2013, Matip scored both goals as Schalke recorded an important 2–1 victory over Fortuna Düsseldorf, securing the club's second win in 12 games. Matip scored a notable goal against FC Basel in the 2013–14 UEFA Champions League: at least four Schalke players were offside but this was missed by the assistant referee and Matip scored.

=== Liverpool ===
==== 2016–17 season ====
On 15 February 2016, Matip announced signing a four-year pre-contract agreement to join Liverpool on a free transfer, following the expiration of his contract with Schalke. He made his debut for Liverpool on 23 August 2016 in a 5–0 win against Burton Albion in the 2016–17 EFL Cup. He scored his first goal for the club in a 4–2 Premier League win over Crystal Palace at Selhurst Park on 29 October. Matip was voted as Liverpool's Player of the Month for his performances in November.

Matip was withdrawn from the fixture against Manchester United on 15 January 2017, as Liverpool were yet to get full clarity from FIFA over his eligibility, and also as a result of the Cameroon Football Federation failing to confirm that Matip could therefore play club football during the 2017 Africa Cup of Nations. Overall, Matip was considered as a key player to improving Liverpool's defence, which had received extreme criticism prior to the season, during the 2016–17 season.

==== 2017–2019 ====
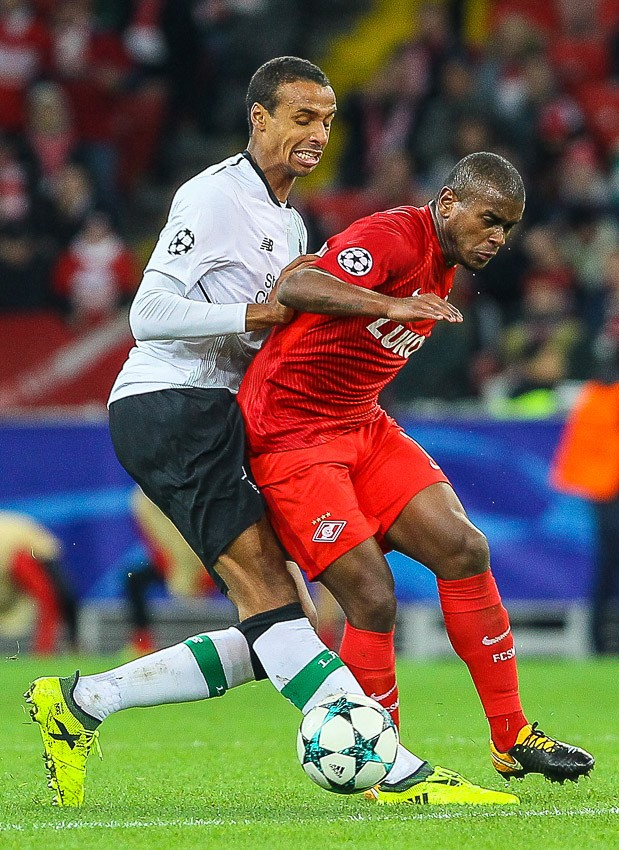
Matip (left) playing for Liverpool in 2017

On 1 October 2017, Matip was criticised for his poor performance against Newcastle United, being deemed at fault for Newcastle's goal. On 4 November, Matip scored his first goal of the 2017–18 season, scoring in a 4–1 win over West Ham United at the London Stadium. On 27 January 2018, Matip scored an own goal in a 3–2 home defeat to West Bromwich Albion in the fourth round of the 2017–18 FA Cup. On 31 March, during the match against Crystal Palace, Matip suffered a thigh injury. On 3 April, Liverpool announced that he would have to undergo surgery to fix it, and that he will miss the rest of the season.

Matip suffered another muscle injury in July 2018 during a tour of the United States, but recovered to be named an unused substitute in a 2–0 away win over Crystal Palace on 20 August. On 13 December, Matip suffered a broken collarbone after the 1–0 win against Napoli. The injury saw him miss another six weeks of the season. Despite the showing of interest by new Fulham manager Claudio Ranieri, Matip remained at Liverpool for the rest of the season, establishing himself in the starting eleven. On 1 June 2019, Matip assisted Divock Origi's goal in the 87th minute of the 2019 Champions League final, which saw Liverpool defeat Tottenham Hotspur 2–0 to win the title.

==== 2019–20 season ====
On 4 August 2019, Matip scored Liverpool's goal in the 2019 FA Community Shield. Liverpool lost the game 5–4 on penalties. He scored his first goal of the Premier League season on 24 August, opening the scoring in a 3–1 home win over Arsenal. On 18 October 2019, he signed a new contract with Liverpool until June 2024.

His 2019–20 season was plagued by injuries, and Joe Gomez quickly took his place as Jürgen Klopp's preferred centre-back to partner Virgil van Dijk. His first injury occurred in a Premier League match on 20 October 2019 against rivals Manchester United. He returned in late January 2020, making just one league start before the season was suspended due to the COVID-19 pandemic. He was injured again on 21 June 2020 during a Merseyside derby against Everton, with the club later revealing he would not be able to feature for the rest of the season.

==== 2020–2024 ====
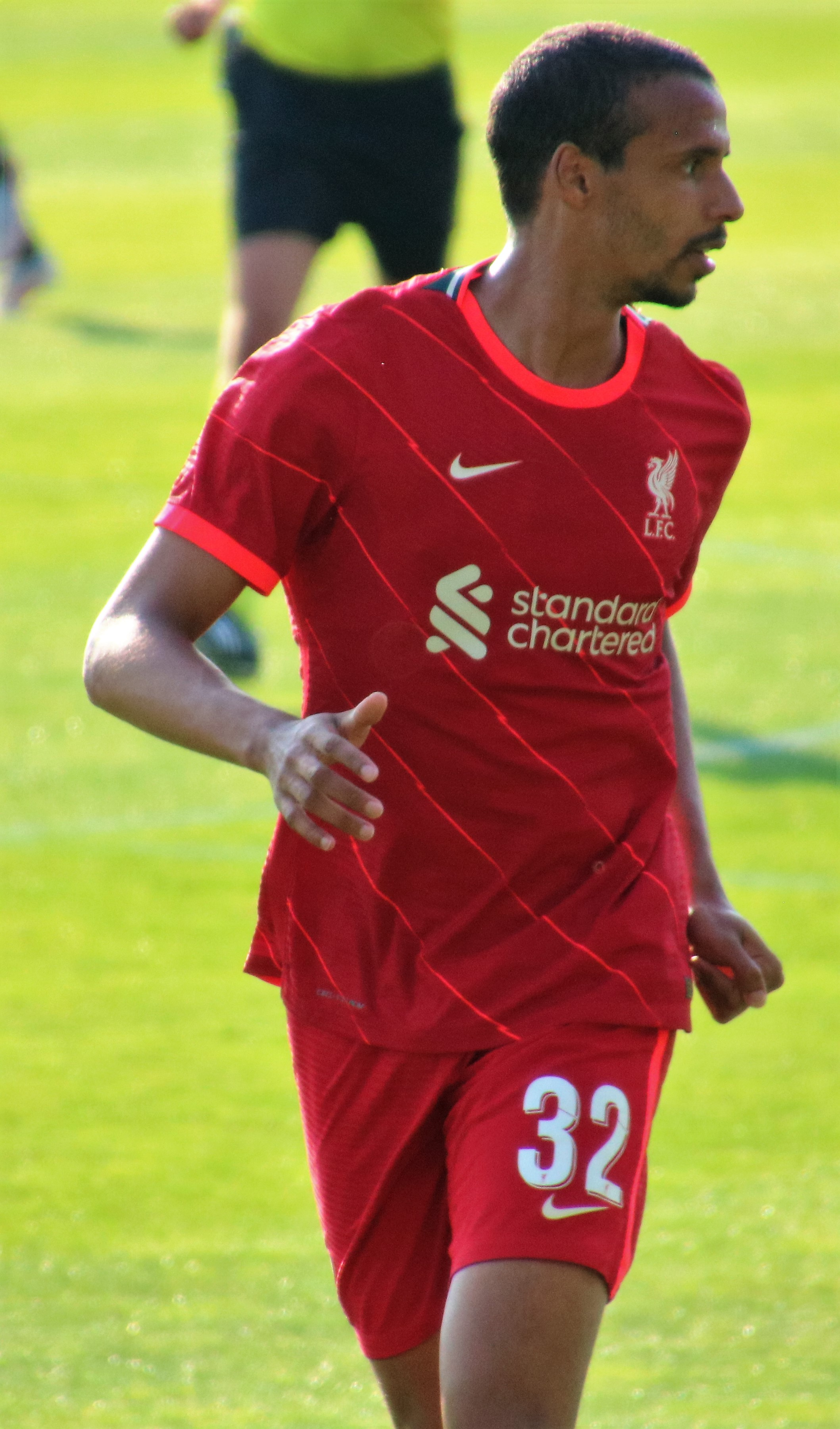
Matip playing for Liverpool in 2021

On 28 January 2021, Matip was substituted at half-time against Tottenham Hotspur, and it was revealed that he suffered ankle ligament injury and would miss the remainder of the 2020–21 season. On 23 February 2022, Matip scored his first goal of the 2021–22 season in a 6–0 win against Leeds United. He was named Premier League Player of the Month for February on 11 March. Liverpool narrowly missed out on the chance to achieve a historic quadruple, coming second in the Premier League and the 2021–22 UEFA Champions League but winning both the EFL Cup and the FA Cup.

On 13 September 2022, Matip scored his first Champions League goal for Liverpool with a late header in a 2–1 win against Ajax in the 2022–23 Champions League. On 3 December 2023, Matip came off in the 69th minute in Liverpool's 4–3 home win against Fulham after suffering an ACL injury which would make him miss the remainder of the 2023–24 season. On 17 May 2024, it was confirmed that he would leave Liverpool at the end of the season.

On 12 October 2024, Matip announced his retirement from professional football at the age of 33.

== International career ==
Matip was called up on 23 December 2009 by Cameroon for the 2010 Africa Cup of Nations but he later declined to take part in the tournament. On 2 March 2010, aged 18, Matip opted to play his international football for Cameroon, after meeting up with the national team ahead of a friendly against Italy on 3 March 2010. He made his first appearance in the match against Italy and went on to play in the 2010 FIFA World Cup for Cameroon. He was also part of the Cameroon squad for the 2014 FIFA World Cup where he played twice and scored against the host team Brazil, the team's only goal of the tournament.

In January 2017, Matip was selected for the 2017 Africa Cup of Nations but rejected the call-up. It was later revealed that Matip retired from the national team when he was still at Schalke, but had not followed FIFA procedure by informing the Cameroonian Football Association via letter. While the confusion was cleared up by FIFA, Matip could not play for Liverpool. He subsequently missed a Premier League tie against Manchester United and an FA Cup third round match against Plymouth Argyle. Matip cited his reason for his retirement was his unhappiness with the national team set up and his bad experience with the coaching staff.

== Style of play ==
Strong and clever, Matip was known for his ability to dribble up the pitch to create momentum.

== Personal life ==
Matip was born in Bochum, North Rhine-Westphalia, to a German mother and former Cameroonian footballer Jean Matip. He is the brother of the fellow Cameroon international Marvin Matip and is a cousin of Joseph-Désiré Job. He attended the Gesamtschule Berger Feld.

He married long-term partner Larissa Stollenwerk in the aftermath of Liverpool's 2020 Premier League title, and in June 2021 they welcomed their first child, a son.

== Career statistics ==
=== Club ===
Appearances and goals by club, season and competition
Club	Season	League			National cup (Note: Includes DFB-Pokal, FA Cup)		League cup (Note: Includes EFL Cup)		Europe		Other		Total	
Club	Season	Division	Apps	Goals	Apps	Goals	Apps	Goals	Apps	Goals	Apps	Goals	Apps	Goals
Schalke 04 II	2009–10	Regionalliga West	3	1	—		—		—		—		3	1
Schalke 04 II	2010–11	Regionalliga West	1	0	—		—		—		—		1	0
Schalke 04 II	Total		4	1	—		—		—		—		4	1
Schalke 04	2009–10	Bundesliga	20	3	2	0	—		—		—		22	3
Schalke 04	2010–11	Bundesliga	26	0	4	0	—		11 (Note: Appearance(s) in UEFA Champions League)	1	1 (Note: Appearance in DFL-Supercup)	0	42	1
Schalke 04	2011–12	Bundesliga	30	3	3	1	—		13 (Note: Appearances in UEFA Europa League)	1	1	0	47	5
Schalke 04	2012–13	Bundesliga	32	3	1	0	—		6	0	—		39	3
Schalke 04	2013–14	Bundesliga	31	3	3	0	—		8	1	—		42	4
Schalke 04	2014–15	Bundesliga	21	2	1	1	—		3	0	—		25	3
Schalke 04	2015–16	Bundesliga	34	3	2	0	—		5	1	—		41	4
Schalke 04	Total		194	17	16	2	—		46	4	2	0	258	23
Liverpool	2016–17	Premier League	29	1	0	0	3	0	—		—		32	1
Liverpool	2017–18	Premier League	25	1	2	0	0	0	8	0	—		35	1
Liverpool	2018–19	Premier League	22	1	0	0	1	0	8	0	—		31	1
Liverpool	2019–20	Premier League	9	1	1	0	0	0	1	0	2 (Note: One appearance and one goal in FA Community Shield, one appearance in UEFA Super Cup)	1	13	2
Liverpool	2020–21	Premier League	10	1	0	0	0	0	2	0	0	0	12	1
Liverpool	2021–22	Premier League	31	3	1	0	4	0	7	0	—		43	3
Liverpool	2022–23	Premier League	14	1	1	0	1	0	4	1	1 (Note: Appearance in FA Community Shield)	0	21	2
Liverpool	2023–24	Premier League	10	0	0	0	1	0	3	0	—		14	0
Liverpool	Total		150	9	5	0	10	0	33	1	3	1	201	11
Career total			348	27	21	2	10	0	79	5	5	1	463	35

=== International ===
Appearances and goals by national team and year
National team	Year	Apps	Goals
Cameroon	2010	6	0
Cameroon	2011	3	0
Cameroon	2012	4	0
Cameroon	2013	6	0
Cameroon	2014	7	1
Cameroon	2015	1	0
Total		27	1

Cameroon score listed first, score column indicates score after each Matip goal

List of international goals scored by Joël Matip
No.	Date	Venue	Cap	Opponent	Score	Result	Competition	Ref.
1	23 June 2014	Estádio Nacional Mané Garrincha, Brasília, Brazil	26	Brazil	1–1	1–4	2014 FIFA World Cup	

== Honours ==
Schalke 04

- DFB-Pokal: 2010–11
- DFL-Supercup: 2011

Liverpool

- Premier League: 2019–20
- FA Cup: 2021–22
- EFL Cup: 2021–22, 2023–24
- FA Community Shield: 2022
- UEFA Champions League: 2018–19; runner-up: 2021–22
- UEFA Super Cup: 2019

Individual

- PFA Player of the Month: September 2019
- Premier League Player of the Month: February 2022
- CAF Team of the Year: 2019
