= Thorsten Schriever =

German football referee (born 1976)

- Born: 7 March 1976 (age 50); Germany
- Height: 1.80 m (5 ft 11 in)
- Other occupation: Administrative employee

Domestic
- Years: League
- 2003–: 2. Bundesliga

Thorsten Schriever (born 7 March 1976), is a German football referee. He lives in Dorum and works as an administrative employee.

He has been active as a referee since 2000.
