= Felix Schröter =

German footballer

Personal information
- Date of birth: 23 January 1996 (age 30)
- Place of birth: Ulm, Germany
- Height: 1.77 m (5 ft 10 in)
- Position: Forward

Team information
- Current team: Våg
- Number: 8

Youth career
- 2000–2003: TSV Pfuhl
- 2003–2008: SSV Ulm
- 2008–2011: VfB Stuttgart
- 2011–2014: 1899 Hoffenheim
- 2014–2015: Schalke 04

Senior career*
Years	Team	Apps	(Gls)
2015–2018	Schalke 04 II	24	(1)
2015	→ FC Heidenheim (loan)	3	(0)
2018–2019	FV Illertissen	33	(15)
2019–2021	SpVgg Unterhaching	50	(9)
2021–2022	Jerv	27	(11)
2023	Tampa Bay Rowdies	12	(1)
2023–2025	Jerv	22	(10)
2026–	Våg		

International career
2010	Germany U-15	1	(0)
2011–2012	Germany U-16	2	(2)

Managerial career
- 2026–: Våg (player-coach)
- * Club domestic league appearances and goals as of 18 April 2026

Felix Schröter (born 23 January 1996) is a German professional footballer who is both coach and player for Våg.

== Career ==
In 2015, Schröter joined FC Heidenheim on loan from Schalke 04. He made his 2. Bundesliga debut on 14 August 2015 against Arminia Bielefeld. He replaced Smail Morabit after 77 minutes.

Schröter signed with the Tampa Bay Rowdies of the USL Championship on 23 January 2023.

In September 2023, Schröter signed with his former club FK Jerv, on a contract until 31 December 2025. In the fall of 2025 he didn’t come to an agreement with the club for a new contract.

In March 2026 he signed as a playing manager for FK Våg, on the fourth tier of the Norwegian football league system.

== Career statistics ==
As of match played 11 September 2022

Appearances and goals by club, season and competition
Club	Season	Division	League		National cup		League cup		Continent		Total	
Club	Season	Division	Apps	Goals	Apps	Goals	Apps	Goals	Apps	Goals	Apps	Goals
Schalke 04 II	2016–17	Regionalliga West	12	0	0	0	0	0	—		12	0
Schalke 04 II	2017–18	Regionalliga West	0	0	0	0	0	0	—		0	0
Schalke 04 II	Total		12	0	0	0	0	0	0	0	12	0
FV Illertissen	2018–19	Regionalliga Bayern	33	15	0	0	0	0	—		33	15
SpVgg Unterhaching	2019–20	3. Liga	33	8	0	0	0	0	—		33	8
SpVgg Unterhaching	2020–21	3. Liga	17	1	0	0	0	0	—		17	1
SpVgg Unterhaching	Total		50	9	0	0	0	0	0	0	50	9
Jerv	2021	1. divisjon	13	6	0	0	0	0	—		13	6
Jerv	2022	Eliteserien	11	5	2	1	0	0	—		13	6
Jerv	Total		24	11	2	1	0	0	0	0	26	12
Career total			119	35	2	1	0	0	0	0	121	36
