= Lukas Schmitz =

German footballer (born 1988)

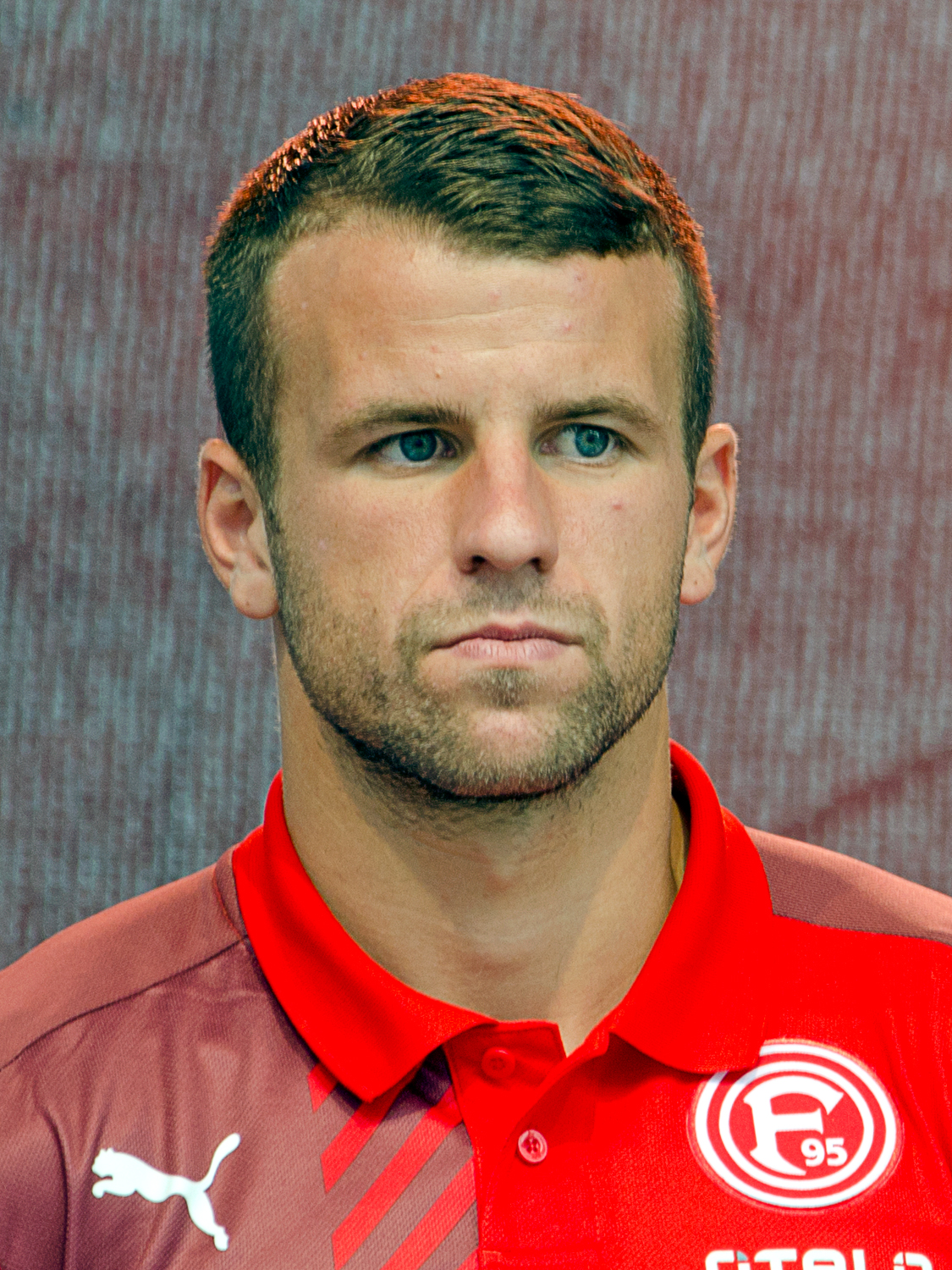
- Schmitz with Fortuna Düsseldorf in 2015

Personal information
- Date of birth: 13 October 1988 (age 38)
- Place of birth: Hattingen, West Germany
- Height: 1.84 m (6 ft 0 in)
- Position: Left back

Youth career
- 1991–1993: DJK Märkisch Hattingen
- 1993–1995: TuS Bredenscheid
- 1995–2006: TSG Sprockhövel

Senior career*
Years	Team	Apps	(Gls)
2006–2007	TSG Sprockhövel	23	(11)
2007–2009	VfL Bochum II	35	(4)
2009–2010	Schalke 04 II	6	(1)
2009–2011	Schalke 04	52	(2)
2011–2014	Werder Bremen	52	(0)
2013	Werder Bremen II	3	(0)
2014–2018	Fortuna Düsseldorf	94	(3)
2018–2020	Wolfsberger AC	61	(3)
2020–2021	VVV-Venlo	12	(0)
- * Club domestic league appearances and goals as of 1 July 2021

Lukas Schmitz (born 13 October 1988) is a German former professional footballer who played as a left back.

== Career ==
Schmitz began his career with TSG Sprockhövel. Here he scored 11 goals in 23 games during the 2006–07 season of the Verbandsliga Westfalen 2. In July 2007, he signed for VfL Bochum II. He played 36 games with the VfL Bochum reserve squad.

Schmitz transferred to nearby rivals Schalke 04 on 8 May 2009. He made his professional debut on 18 September 2009 in a match against VfL Wolfsburg. Schmitz used to play as a left midfielder or a defensive midfielder. In the 2010–11 season, he became the Schalke's main left fullback.

Schmitz signed a four-year contract with Werder Bremen on 17 June 2011. In 2014, he joined Fortuna Düsseldorf.

Later on, Schmitz went to Austria to play for Wolfsberger AC in 2018. In May 2020, he signed for VVV-Venlo to play there until June 2022, starting from 2020–21.

== Personal life ==
Schmitz studies Political sciences and Science of Public Administration over distance learning.

== Honours ==
Schalke 04

- DFB-Pokal: 2010–11
