= Tobias Welz =

German football referee (born 1977)

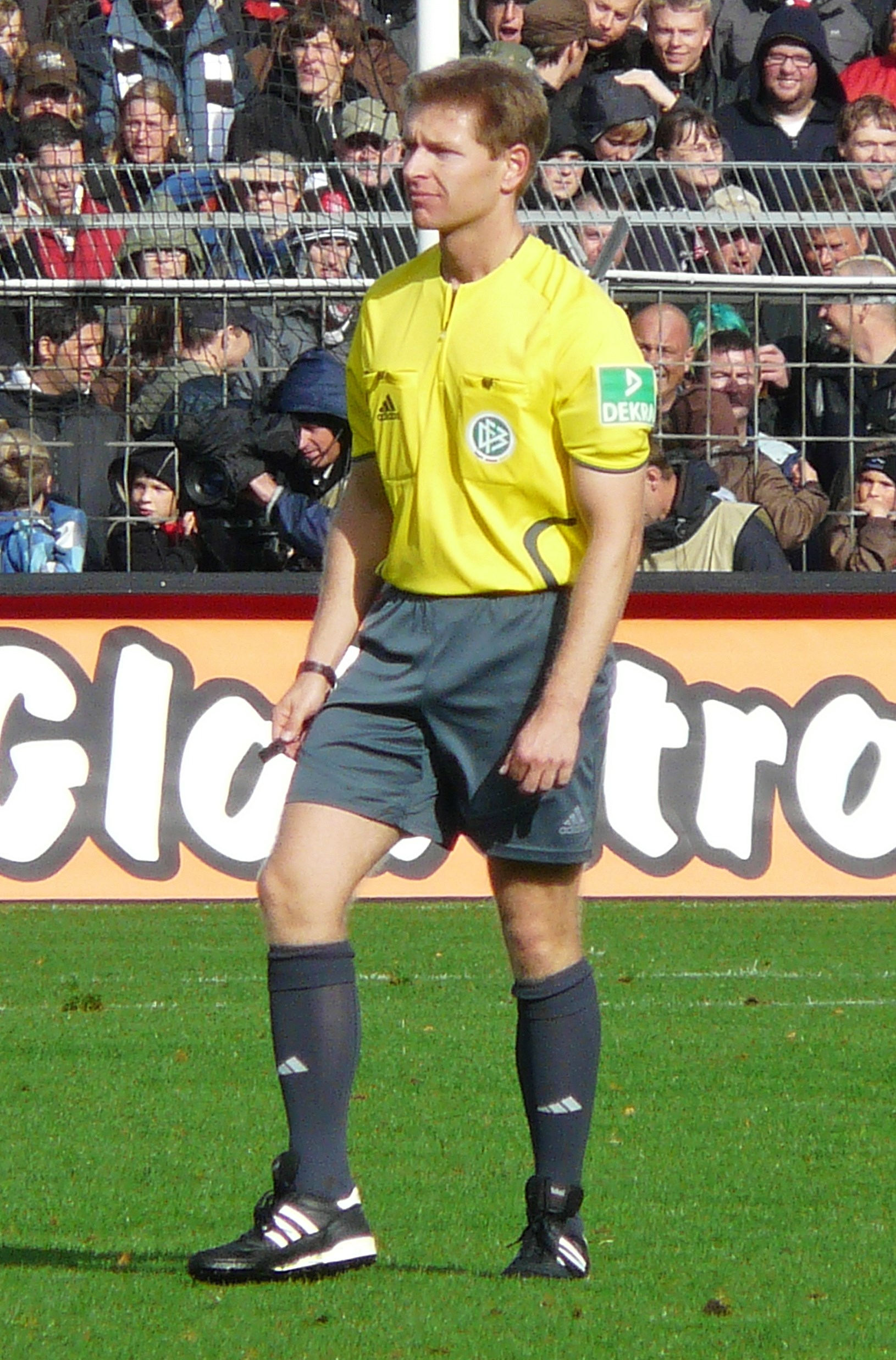
- Welz in 2009
- Born: 11 July 1977 (age 49)
- Other occupation: Police officer

Domestic
Years	League	Role
1999–	DFB	Referee
2004–2026	2. Bundesliga	Referee
2010–2026	Bundesliga	Referee

International
Years	League	Role
2013–2019	FIFA listed	Referee

Tobias Welz (born 11 July 1977) is a German football referee who is based in Wiesbaden. He referees for SpVgg Nassau Wiesbaden of the Hessian Football Association. He was a FIFA referee between 2013 and 2019.

== Refereeing career ==
He has officiated in the German Football Association (DFB) since 1999. His made his Bundesliga debut at 28 August 2010 in a game between 1. FC Nürnberg and SC Freiburg.

== Personal life ==
Welz is a police officer with the Hesse State Police. He lives in Wiesbaden, where in his youth he played for SC Klarenthal 1968 and FV Biebrich 02.

== See also ==
- List of football referees
