= 2005–06 FC Schalke 04 season =

FC Schalke 04
2005-06 season
- Manager: Ralf Rangnick (until 12 December); Oliver Reck (caretaker); Mirko Slomka (from 4 January)
- Stadium: Veltins-Arena
- Bundesliga: 4th
- DFB-Pokal: Round of 16
- UEFA Champions League: Group stage
- UEFA Cup: Semi-finals
- Top goalscorer: League: Kevin Kurányi; Søren Larsen (10 each); All: Kevin Kurányi; Søren Larsen (14 each)
Home colours	Away colours	Third colours

During the 2005–06 German football season, FC Schalke 04 competed in the Bundesliga.

== Season summary ==
The 2005-06 season was one of ups and downs for Schalke. The club only dropped two points more compared to the previous season, but this was only good enough to see Schalke finish in 4th. Schalke also exited the Champions League at the group stage. However, there was little shame in elimination given that they were placed in the same group as last season's runners-up AC Milan and semi-finalists PSV Eindhoven. Schalke compensated with a great run to the UEFA Cup semi-final, with eventual champions Sevilla needing extra time to overcome the Germans. Less flattering was Schalke's domestic cup form, with the club thrashed by eventual finalists Frankfurt 6-0 in the second round. This humiliation, along with the mediocre league form, saw coach Ralf Rangnick sacked in December, with Mirko Slomka appointed as his replacement in early January.

== First-team squad ==
Squad at end of season

Note: Flags indicate national team as defined under FIFA eligibility rules; some limited exceptions apply. Players may hold more than one non-FIFA nationality.

No.	Pos.	Nation	Player
1	GK	GER	Frank Rost
2	MF	DEN	Christian Poulsen
3	DF	GEO	Levan Kobiashvili
4	DF	GER	Thomas Kläsener
5	DF	BRA	Marcelo Bordon
6	MF	TUR	Hamit Altıntop (Note: Altıntop was born in Gelsenkirchen, West Germany (now Germany), but also qualified to represent Turkey internationally and represented Turkey at U-18, U-20 and U-21 level before making his international debut for Turkey in 2004.)
7	MF	GER	Mimoun Azaouagh (Note: Azaouagh was born in Beni Sidel, Morocco, but also qualified to represent Germany internationally and represented Germany at U-21 level.)
8	MF	GER	Fabian Ernst
9	FW	DEN	Søren Larsen
10	MF	BRA	Lincoln
11	FW	DEN	Ebbe Sand
12	DF	NED	Marco van Hoogdalem
13	GK	GER	Christofer Heimeroth
14	FW	GER	Gerald Asamoah (Note: Asamoah was born in Mampong, Ghana, but was raised in Germany from the age of 12 and made his international debut for Germany in May 2001.)
15	DF	POL	Tomasz Wałdoch
16	DF	URU	Darío Rodríguez

No.	Pos.	Nation	Player
18	DF	BRA	Rafinha
19	MF	URU	Gustavo Varela
20	DF	SCG	Mladen Krstajić (Note: Krstajić was born in Zenica, SFR Yugoslavia (now Bosnia and Herzegovina), but was raised in Serbia and Montenegro (now Serbia) and made his international debut for Serbia and Montenegro in 1999.)
21	MF	GER	Alexander Baumjohann
22	FW	GER	Kevin Kurányi (Note: Kurányi was born in Rio de Janeiro, Brazil, but also qualified to represent Germany internationally through his father and Panama through his mother and represented Germany at U-21 and B level before making his international debut for Germany in March 2003.)
24	DF	GER	Christian Pander
25	MF	BIH	Zlatan Bajramović (Note: Bajramović was born in Hamburg, West Germany (now Germany), but also qualified to represent Bosnia and Herzegovina internationally through his parents and made his international debut for Bosnia and Herzegovina in 2002.)
26	DF	GER	Niko Bungert
27	DF	GER	Tim Hoogland
29	GK	GER	Manuel Neuer
31	DF	GER	Sebastian Boenisch (Note: Boenisch was born in Gliwice, Poland, but was raised in Germany from the age of 1 and represented Germany at U-20 and U-21 level before changing his allegiance to Poland and making his international debut for Poland in September 2010.)
33	FW	MAR	Joseph Laumann
34	MF	GER	Mario Klinger
35	MF	GER	David Müller
36	MF	LBN	Bilal Aziz

=== Left club during season ===
Note: Flags indicate national team as defined under FIFA eligibility rules; some limited exceptions apply. Players may hold more than one non-FIFA nationality.

No.	Pos.	Nation	Player
23	MF	GER	Simon Cziommer (on loan to Roda JC)

== Competitions ==
=== Bundesliga ===
==== League table ====
Pos	Team	Pld	W	D	L	GF	GA	GD	Pts	Qualification or relegation
2	Werder Bremen	34	21	7	6	79	37	+42	70	Qualification to Champions League group stage
3	Hamburger SV	34	21	5	8	53	30	+23	68	Qualification to Champions League third qualifying round
4	Schalke 04	34	16	13	5	47	31	+16	61	Qualification to UEFA Cup first round
5	Bayer Leverkusen	34	14	10	10	64	49	+15	52	Qualification to UEFA Cup first round
6	Hertha BSC	34	12	12	10	52	48	+4	48	Qualification to Intertoto Cup third round

Source: kicker.de
Rules for classification: 1) points; 2) goal difference; 3) number of goals scored.

=== DFB-Pokal ===
==== First round ====
20 August 2005	FC Bremerhaven	0–3	Schalke 04	Bremerhaven
18:00		Report	Larsen 35', 65'; Bajramović 67'	Stadium: Nordseestadion; Attendance: 9,900; Referee: Thorsten Schriever (Otterndorf)

==== Second round ====
25 October 2005	Eintracht Frankfurt	6–0	Schalke 04	Frankfurt am Main
19:30	Meier 28', 68'; Huggel 30'; Spycher 64'; Copado 79'; Ochs 85'	Report		Stadium: Commerzbank-Arena; Attendance: 33,200; Referee: Felix Brych (Munich)

=== UEFA Champions League ===
==== Group stage ====
Pos	Team	Pld	W	D	L	GF	GA	GD	Pts	Qualification	MIL	PSV	SCH	FEN
1	(Italy) Milan	6	3	2	1	12	6	+6	11	Advance to knockout stage	—	0–0	3–2	3–1
2	(Netherlands) PSV Eindhoven	6	3	1	2	4	6	−2	10	Advance to knockout stage	1–0	—	1–0	2–0
3	(Germany) Schalke 04	6	2	2	2	12	9	+3	8	Transfer to UEFA Cup	2–2	3–0	—	2–0
4	(Turkey) Fenerbahçe	6	1	1	4	7	14	−7	4		0–4	3–0	3–3	—

Source: RSSSF

13 September 2005 1	PSV Eindhoven (Netherlands)	1–0	(Germany) Schalke 04	Eindhoven, Netherlands
20:45	Vennegoor of Hesselink 33'	Report		Stadium: Philips Stadion; Attendance: 33,000; Referee: Yuri Baskakov (Russia)

28 September 2005 2	Schalke 04 (Germany)	2–2	(Italy) Milan	Gelsenkirchen, Germany
20:45	Larsen 3'; Altıntop 70'	Report	Seedorf 1'; Shevchenko 59'	Stadium: Arena AufSchalke; Attendance: 53,425; Referee: Claus Bo Larsen (Denmark)

19 October 2005 3	Fenerbahçe (Turkey)	3–3	(Germany) Schalke 04	Istanbul, Turkey
20:45	Fábio 14'; Márcio 73'; Appiah 79'	Report	Lincoln 59', 62'; Kurányi 77'	Stadium: Şükrü Saracoğlu Stadium; Attendance: 50,000; Referee: Alain Hamer (Luxembourg)

1 November 2005 4	Schalke 04 (Germany)	2–0	(Turkey) Fenerbahçe	Gelsenkirchen, Germany
20:45	Kurányi 32'; Sand 90+2'	Report		Stadium: Arena AufSchalke; Attendance: 53,425; Referee: Luis Medina Cantalejo (Spain)

23 November 2005 5	Schalke 04 (Germany)	3–0	(Netherlands) PSV Eindhoven	Gelsenkirchen, Germany
20:45	Kobiashvili 18' (pen.), 72', 79' (pen.)	Report		Stadium: Arena AufSchalke; Attendance: 54,000; Referee: Ľuboš Micheľ (Slovakia)

6 December 2005 6	Milan (Italy)	3–2	(Germany) Schalke 04	Milan, Italy
20:45	Pirlo 42'; Kaká 52', 60'	Report	Poulsen 44'; Lincoln 66'	Stadium: San Siro; Attendance: 43,800; Referee: Manuel Mejuto González (Spain)

=== UEFA Cup ===
==== Knockout phase ====
===== Round of 32 =====
15 February 2006 First leg	Schalke 04 (Germany)	2–1	(Spain) Espanyol	Gelsenkirchen, Germany
20:00	Bordon 67'; Ernst 88'	Report	García 34'	Stadium: Veltins-Arena; Attendance: 53,642; Referee: Roberto Rosetti (Italy)

23 February 2006 Second leg	Espanyol (Spain)	0–3 (1–5 agg.)	(Germany) Schalke 04	Barcelona, Spain
21:45		Report	Kurányi 54'; Sand 70'; Lincoln 73'	Stadium: Estadi Olímpic Lluís Companys; Attendance: 18,100; Referee: Tom Henning Øvrebø (Norway)

===== Round of 16 =====
9 March 2006 First leg	Palermo (Italy)	1–0	(Germany) Schalke 04	Palermo, Italy
18:00	Brienza 15'	Report		Stadium: Stadio Renzo Barbera; Attendance: 10,581; Referee: Eric Braamhaar (Netherlands)

16 March 2006 Second leg	Schalke 04 (Germany)	3–0 (3–1 agg.)	(Italy) Palermo	Gelsenkirchen, Germany
20:30	Kobiashvili 44' (pen.); Larsen 72'; Azaouagh 80'	Report		Stadium: Veltins-Arena; Attendance: 52,151; Referee: Graham Poll (England)

===== Quarter-finals =====
30 March 2006 First leg	Levski Sofia (Bulgaria)	1–3	(Germany) Schalke 04	Sofia, Bulgaria
19:00	Borimirov 6'	Report	Varela 48'; Lincoln 69'; Asamoah 79'	Stadium: Vasil Levski National Stadium; Attendance: 38,000; Referee: Mike Riley (England)

6 April 2006 Second leg	Schalke 04 (Germany)	1–1 (4–2 agg.)	(Bulgaria) Levski Sofia	Gelsenkirchen, Germany
20:30	Lincoln 58'	Report	Angelov 24'	Stadium: Veltins-Arena; Attendance: 52,973; Referee: Massimo Busacca (Switzerland)

===== Semi-finals =====
20 April 2006 First leg	Schalke 04 (Germany)	0–0	(Spain) Sevilla	Gelsenkirchen, Germany
20:30		Report		Stadium: Veltins-Arena; Attendance: 53,551; Referee: Tom Henning Øvrebø (Norway)

27 April 2006 Second leg	Sevilla (Spain)	1–0 (a.e.t.) (1–0 agg.)	(Germany) Schalke 04	Seville, Spain
21:30	Puerta 101'	Report		Stadium: Ramón Sánchez Pizjuán Stadium; Attendance: 46,000; Referee: Massimo De Santis (Italy)
