= Rafinha (footballer, born 1985) =

Brazilian footballer

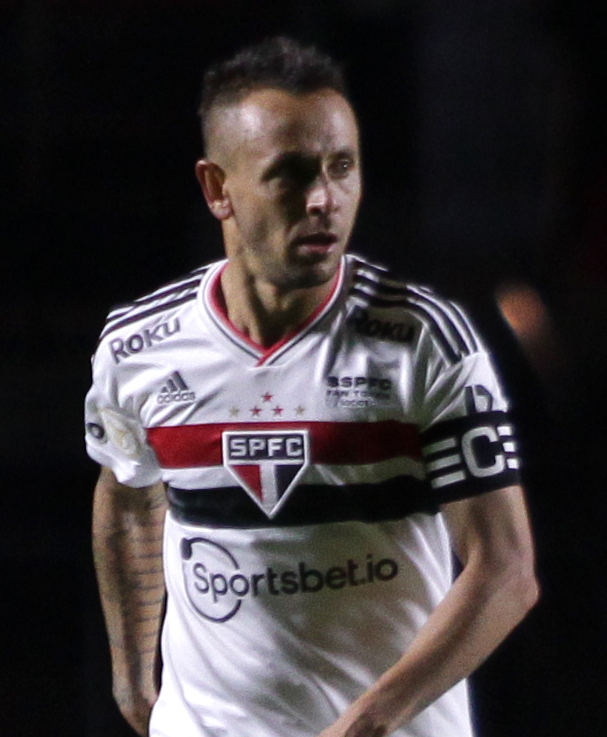
- Rafinha playing for São Paulo in 2022

Personal information
- Full name: Márcio Rafael Ferreira de Souza
- Date of birth: 7 September 1985 (age 41)
- Place of birth: Londrina, Brazil
- Height: 1.71 m (5 ft 7 in)
- Position: Right-back

Team information
- Current team: São Paulo (coordinator)

Youth career
- 1992–1997: Gremio Londrina
- 1997–2000: PSTC
- 2000–2004: Londrina

Senior career*
Years	Team	Apps	(Gls)
2002–2005	Coritiba	48	(5)
2005–2010	Schalke 04	153	(7)
2010–2011	Genoa	34	(2)
2011–2019	Bayern Munich	179	(5)
2019–2020	Flamengo	32	(0)
2020–2021	Olympiacos	14	(0)
2021–2022	Grêmio	37	(0)
2022–2024	São Paulo	83	(0)
2025	Coritiba	9	(0)
Total		589	(19)

International career
2002–2005	Brazil U20	8	(2)
2008	Brazil U23	8	(0)
2008–2017	Brazil	4	(0)

Managerial career
- 2026–: São Paulo (coordinator)
Medal record
Representing Brazil
FIFA U-20 World Cup
Third place	2005 Netherlands
Olympic Games
Bronze medal – third place	2008 Beijing
- * Club domestic league appearances and goals

Márcio Rafael Ferreira de Souza (born 7 September 1985), better known as Rafinha ([ʁɐˈfiɲa]; "Little Rafa"), is a Brazilian former professional footballer who played as a right-back.

A former Brazilian youth international between 2002 and 2008, Rafinha debuted for the Brazil national team in 2008, going on to earn four appearances for the national side.

== Club career ==
=== Brazil and Schalke ===
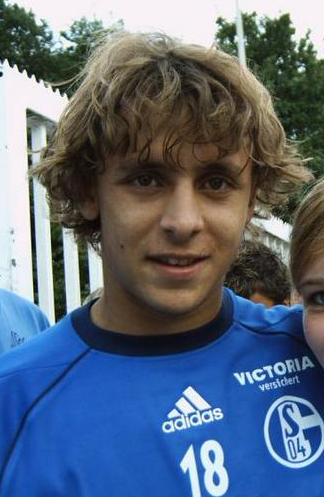
Rafinha with Schalke 04 in 2005

Rafinha began his football career at the age of seven, playing for Gremio Londrinense, a futsal team from his home town of Londrina, Paraná. By age 12, he had begun training with PSTC, a local football club, before signing for Londrina Esporte Clube in 2000 at the age of 15. At the end of his second year with Londrina, Rafinha was signed by Coritiba. This meant moving hundreds of kilometers from his home town, but it also allowed Rafinha to display his talents on the national stage. For Coritiba, Rafinha made 23 appearances in the 2004 season and scored three goals in 13 appearances in the 2005 season.

At Coritiba, Rafinha eventually found his way into the Brazil under-20 national team and played in the 2005 FIFA World Youth Championship in the Netherlands. During the tournament, he scored two goals and played an integral part in Brazil's progress to the bronze medal. Rafinha's performance at the tournament alerted numerous European teams to his ability, with German club Schalke 04 ultimately signing the right-back from Coritiba for an estimated €5 million on a four-year contract. At Schalke, he made 42 appearances in 2005–06 season, two goals in 35 appearances in the 2006–07 season, five goals in 46 appearances in the 2007–08 season, two goals in 40 appearances in the 2008–09 season, and two goals in 35 appearances in the 2009–10 season.

=== Genoa ===
On 4 August 2010, it was confirmed that Rafinha moved from Schalke to Italian side Genoa. The transfer had cost Genoa €8 million. He scored two goals in 34 appearances in his only Serie A season. After Genoa had failed to pay the transfer fee in time, however, Rafinha's former club Schalke sued Genoa through the Court of Arbitration for Sport (CAS).

=== Bayern Munich ===
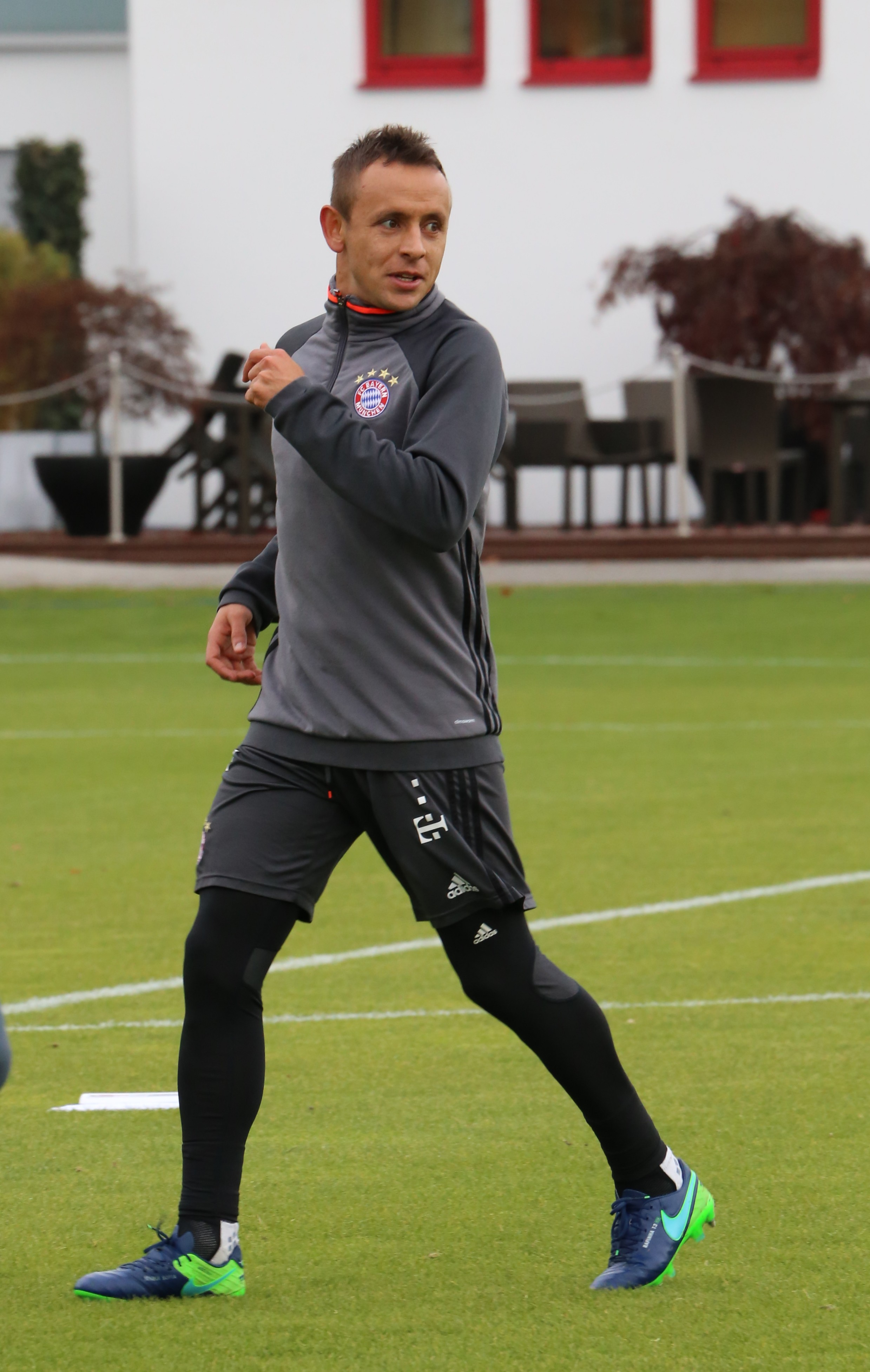
Rafinha training with Bayern Munich in 2016

On 1 June 2011, Bayern Munich confirmed Rafinha's transfer from Genoa on the same day that they signed his former Schalke teammate Manuel Neuer. Rafinha signed a three-year contract, and reports say Bayern paid €5.75 million for him. He scored his first goal for Bayern against Villarreal, as a substitute in a 2–0 UEFA Champions League win on 14 September 2011. He finished the 2011–12 season with a goal in 35 appearances. Entering as an 83rd-minute substitute on 20 October 2012 during an away match against Fortuna Düsseldorf, he scored his first Bundesliga goal for Bayern in a 5–0 win. He played a total of 13 Bundesliga games throughout the season, adding another goal on 13 April in a 4–0 win over 1. FC Nürnberg. He finished the 2012–13 season with two goals in 17 appearances.

During the 2013–14 season, after fellow right back Philipp Lahm was moved to defensive midfield, Rafinha found more opportunities to play regularly. He made 46 appearances across all competitions, including the entire DFB-Pokal final in which Bayern secured a second consecutive double after defeating Borussia Dortmund.

He finished the 2014–15 season with 41 appearances. He started the 2015–16 season by coming in as a substitute for Robert Lewandowski in the 72nd minute of the German Super Cup. He finished the 2015–16 season with 34 appearances.

He started the 2016–17 season by coming in as a substitute for Thomas Müller in the 87th minute of the German Super Cup. He finished the 2016–17 season with a goal in 28 appearances.

He started the 2017–18 season by starting in the German Super Cup. He finished the 2017–18 season with a goal in 39 appearances for Bayern.

Rafinha was an unused substitute in the German Super Cup. He made his first appearance of the 2018–19 season in the German Cup. He started the match and played the full 90 minutes. He finished the 2018–19 season with a goal in 26 appearances.

=== Flamengo ===
On 9 June 2019, Flamengo confirmed Rafinha's transfer from Bayern. He signed a two-year contract.

=== Olympiacos ===
On 23 August 2020, Rafinha joined Olympiacos after signing a one-plus-one-year contract. He was officially released on 2 February 2021, as he was no longer in the plans of manager Pedro Martins, especially after signing right full-back Kenny Lala as a free transfer a few days earlier. Although, before the mutual termination of his contract, he won the Greek Cup and alongside, Olympiacos set an agreement that, after winning that season's Super League Greece, Rafinha will get a commemorative medal for that title.

=== Grêmio ===
On 29 March 2021, Rafinha joined Grêmio on a deal running until December.

=== São Paulo ===
In December 2021, it was announced that he would join São Paulo starting from the 2022 season. Later on, he managed to captain his team to achieve both 2023 Copa do Brasil and 2024 Supercopa do Brasil, before leaving the club by the end of that year.

=== Return to Coritiba ===
In January 2025, Rafinha rejoined Coritiba, but his contract was terminated two months later after he took part in a Bayern Munich legends game without his club's authorization.

=== Retirement ===
On 8 April 2025, Rafinha retired from professional football when he was selected as a commentator for TNT Sports. He made his debut in a new role in the UEFA Champions League match, broadcasting the match between Arsenal and Real Madrid.

In January 2026, he returned to São Paulo FC as a sports director.

== International career ==
=== Brazil ===
==== U-23 (2008 Olympics) ====
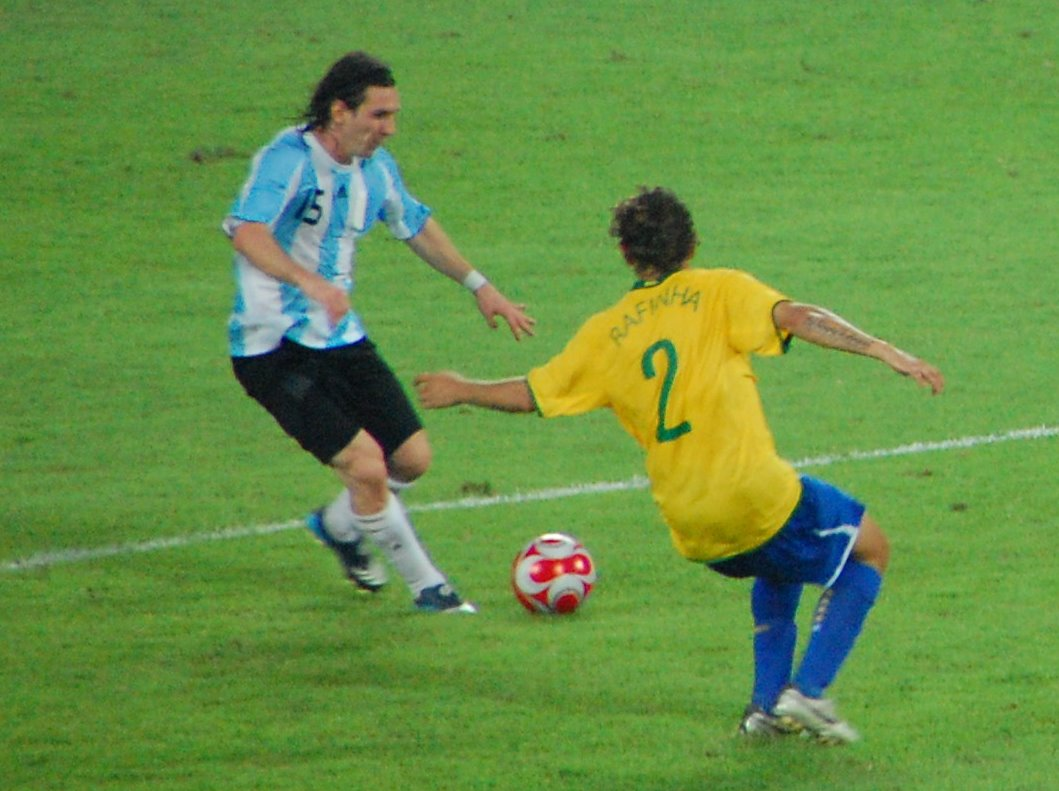
Rafinha against Argentina's Lionel Messi at the 2008 Summer Olympics

In the summer of 2008, Rafinha was involved in a dispute with his club about his participation for Brazil at the 2008 Beijing Olympic Games.

Schalke 04 (to send Rafinha) along with Werder Bremen (Diego), both to Brazil, and Barcelona (Lionel Messi) to Argentina, did not want to release their players for the Olympic games so that they could help them in their domestic and European competitions. The case was taken to FIFA, which ruled that all clubs should release their players aged under 23 for the Games.

Schalke, Werder Bremen, and Barcelona, however, took their case to the Court of Arbitration for Sport (CAS) who eventually ruled in the clubs' favour, stating, "The Court of Arbitration for Sport (CAS) has upheld the appeals filed by FC Schalke 04, SV Werder Bremen and FC Barcelona against the decision issued on 30 July 2008 by the Single Judge of the FIFA's Players' Status Committee that consequently has been set aside in its entirety because the Olympics is not on the FIFA's International Calendar to avoid competing with the FIFA World Cup."

Schalke continued its bar on Rafinha from attending the Olympics. Despite his club's wishes, however, he ultimately did compete for the Brazil squad under the provision that their salaries were paid for by the Brazilian Football Confederation, which won bronze.

==== Senior team ====
Rafinha made his senior debut for Brazil on 26 March 2008 in a friendly match against Sweden. He then went through a six-year absence from the national team, making his second appearance in a friendly against South Africa on 5 March 2014. In May 2014, he was named by Brazil head coach Luiz Felipe Scolari as a standby player for the 2014 FIFA World Cup.

On 17 September 2015, Rafinha was called up by head coach Dunga for two qualifying fixtures for the 2018 World Cup, but five days later turned it down, while also denying claims of rejecting the call-up to represent his adopted homeland Germany.

In June 2017, Rafinha was called up for international friendlies against Argentina and Australia.

Despite his desire to compete in the FIFA World Cup, he was on the stand-by list for both the 2014 and 2018 World Cup squads.

== Style of play ==
Rafinha was known as a skilled defender with ample passing skills, quick pace, agility and a strong shot.

== Post-playing career ==
After retiring, Rafinha worked as a commentator for eight months on Sportv, a position he had previously held sporadically for Bayern matches on TNT Sports. In January 2026, he was hired by São Paulo FC as football coordinator, replacing Muricy Ramalho.

== Personal life ==
Since 2015, Rafinha has had German citizenship.

== Career statistics ==
=== Club ===
Appearances and goals by club, season and competition
Club	Season	League			State league (Note: Includes Campeonato Paranaense, Campeonato Carioca, Campeonato Gaúcho, Campeonato Paulista)		National cup (Note: Includes Copa do Brasil, DFB-Pokal, Coppa Italia)		Continental		Other		Total	
Club	Season	Division	Apps	Goals	Apps	Goals	Apps	Goals	Apps	Goals	Apps	Goals	Apps	Goals
Coritiba	2004	Série A	24	0	0	0	0	0	0	0	—		24	0
Coritiba	2005	Série A	13	3	11	2	3	0	—		—		27	5
Coritiba	Total		37	3	11	2	3	0	0	0	—		51	5
Schalke 04	2005–06	Bundesliga	29	0	—		1	0	12 (Note: Five appearances in UEFA Champions League, seven appearances in UEFA Cup)	0	—		42	0
Schalke 04	2006–07	Bundesliga	31	2	—		2	0	2 (Note: Appearances in UEFA Cup)	0	—		35	2
Schalke 04	2007–08	Bundesliga	32	2	—		3	1	10 (Note: Appearances in UEFA Champions League)	1	1 (Note: Appearance in DFL-Ligapokal)	0	46	4
Schalke 04	2008–09	Bundesliga	30	2	—		3	0	7	0	—		40	2
Schalke 04	2009–10	Bundesliga	31	1	—		4	1	—		—		35	2
Schalke 04	Total		153	7	—		13	2	31	1	1	0	198	10
Genoa	2010–11	Serie A	34	2	—		3	0	—		—		37	2
Bayern Munich	2011–12	Bundesliga	24	0	—		4	0	7	1	—		35	1
Bayern Munich	2012–13	Bundesliga	13	2	—		2	0	2	0	0	0	17	2
Bayern Munich	2013–14	Bundesliga	28	0	—		6	0	9	0	3 (Note: One appearance in UEFA Super Cup, two appearances in FIFA Club World Cup)	0	46	0
Bayern Munich	2014–15	Bundesliga	26	0	—		4	0	11	0	0	0	41	0
Bayern Munich	2015–16	Bundesliga	25	0	—		4	0	4	0	1 (Note: Appearance in DFL-Supercup)	0	34	0
Bayern Munich	2016–17	Bundesliga	20	1	—		2	0	5	0	1	0	28	1
Bayern Munich	2017–18	Bundesliga	27	1	—		3	0	8	0	1	0	39	1
Bayern Munich	2018–19	Bundesliga	16	1	—		4	0	6	0	0	0	26	1
Bayern Munich	Total		179	5	—		29	0	52	1	6	0	266	6
Flamengo	2019	Série A	20	0	—		1	0	7 (Note: Appearances in Copa Libertadores)	0	2 (Note: Appearances in FIFA Club World Cup)	0	30	0
Flamengo	2020	Série A	2	0	10	0	0	0	1	0	3 (Note: Two appearances in Recopa Sudamericana, one appearance in Supercopa do Brasil)	0	16	0
Flamengo	Total		22	0	10	0	1	0	8	0	5	0	46	0
Olympiacos	2020–21	Super League Greece	14	0	—		0	0	8	0	—		22	0
Grêmio	2021	Série A	30	0	7	0	2	0	4 (Note: Appearances in Copa Sudamericana)	0	—		43	0
São Paulo	2022	Série A	32	0	11	0	4	0	3	0	—		50	0
São Paulo	2023	Série A	25	0	3	0	10	1	7	0	—		45	1
São Paulo	2024	Série A	9	0	3	0	4	0	5	0	1 (Note: Appearance in Supercopa do Brasil)	0	22	0
São Paulo	Total		66	0	17	0	18	1	15	0	1	0	117	1
Coritiba	2025	Série B	0	0	9	0	1	0	—		—		10	0
Career total			535	17	54	2	70	3	118	2	13	0	735	24

=== International ===
Appearances and goals by national team and year
National team	Year	Apps	Goals
Brazil	2008	1	0
Brazil	2009	0	0
Brazil	2010	0	0
Brazil	2011	0	0
Brazil	2012	0	0
Brazil	2013	0	0
Brazil	2014	1	0
Brazil	2015	0	0
Brazil	2016	0	0
Brazil	2017	2	0
Brazil	Total	4	0

== Honours ==
=== Club ===
Bayern Munich

- Bundesliga: 2012–13, 2013–14, 2014–15, 2015–16, 2016–17, 2017–18, 2018–19
- DFB-Pokal: 2012–13, 2013–14, 2015–16, 2018–19
- DFL-Supercup: 2012, 2016, 2017, 2018
- UEFA Champions League: 2012–13
- UEFA Super Cup: 2013
- FIFA Club World Cup: 2013

Flamengo

- Campeonato Brasileiro Série A: 2019, 2020
- Supercopa do Brasil: 2020
- Campeonato Carioca: 2020
- Copa Libertadores: 2019
- Recopa Sudamericana: 2020
- FIFA Club World Cup runner-up: 2019

Olympiacos

- Super League Greece: 2020–21
- Greek Football Cup: 2019–20

Grêmio

- Campeonato Gaúcho: 2021
- Recopa Gaúcha: 2021

São Paulo

- Copa do Brasil: 2023
- Supercopa do Brasil: 2024
- Copa Sudamericana runner-up: 2022
- Campeonato Paulista runner-up: 2022

=== Individual ===
- South American Team of the Year: 2019
- Campeonato Brasileiro Série A Team of the Year: 2019
- Bola de Prata: 2019
- Campeonato Carioca Team of the Year: 2020
- Campeonato Paulista Team of the Year: 2022
- Troféu Mesa Redonda Team of the Year: 2023
