= David Müller =

David Müller may refer to:

- David Müller (footballer, born 1984), German football player
- David Müller (footballer, born 1991), German football player
- David Heinrich Müller (1846–1912), Austrian orientalist

== See also ==
- David Muller (disambiguation)
