= 2006–07 FC Schalke 04 season =

FC Schalke 04
2006–07 season
- Manager: Mirko Slomka
- Stadium: Veltins-Arena
- Bundesliga: 2nd
- DFB-Pokal: Second round
- UEFA Cup: First round
- Top goalscorer: League: Kevin Kurányi (15); All: Kevin Kurányi (17)
Home colours	Away colours	Third colours

During the 2006–07 German football season, FC Schalke 04 competed in the Bundesliga.

== Season summary ==
Schalke finished 2nd, two points behind champions Stuttgart.

== First-team squad ==
Squad at end of season

Note: Flags indicate national team as defined under FIFA eligibility rules; some limited exceptions apply. Players may hold more than one non-FIFA nationality.

No.	Pos.	Nation	Player
2	DF	BRA	Gustavo
3	DF	GEO	Levan Kobiashvili
5	DF	BRA	Marcelo Bordon
6	MF	TUR	Hamit Altıntop (Note: Altıntop was born in Gelsenkirchen, Germany, but also qualified to represent Turkey internationally and represented them at U-18, U-20 and U-21 level before making his international debut for Turkey in 2004.)
7	MF	URU	Gustavo Varela
8	MF	GER	Fabian Ernst
9	FW	DEN	Søren Larsen
10	MF	BRA	Lincoln
11	FW	DEN	Peter Løvenkrands
12	GK	GER	Manuel Neuer
14	FW	GER	Gerald Asamoah (Note: Asamoah was born in Mampong, Ghana, but was raised in Germany from the age of 12 and made his international debut for Germany in May 2001.)
15	MF	GER	Timo Kunert
16	DF	URU	Darío Rodríguez
17	MF	GER	Mesut Özil

No.	Pos.	Nation	Player
18	DF	BRA	Rafinha
19	MF	TUR	Halil Altıntop (Note: Altıntop was born in Gelsenkirchen, Germany, but also qualified to represent Turkey internationally and represented them at U-18, U-20 and U-21 level before making his international debut for Turkey in 2005.)
20	DF	SRB	Mladen Krstajić (Note: Krstajić was born in Zenica, SFR Yugoslavia (now Bosnia and Herzegovina), but was raised in Serbia and made his international debut for Serbia in 1999.)
22	FW	GER	Kevin Kurányi (Note: Kurányi was born in Rio de Janeiro, Brazil, but also qualified to represent Germany internationally through his father and Panama through his mother and represented Germany at U-21 and B level before making his international debut for Germany in March 2003.)
24	DF	GER	Christian Pander
25	MF	BIH	Zlatan Bajramović (Note: Bajramović was born in Hamburg, Germany, but also qualified to represent Bosnia and Herzegovina internationally through his parents and made his international debut for Bosnia and Herzegovina in 2002.)
27	DF	GER	Tim Hoogland
28	MF	GER	Markus Heppke
29	FW	GER	Christian Erwig
30	GK	GER	Dennis Lamczyk
31	DF	GER	Sebastian Boenisch (Note: Boenisch was born in Gliwice, Poland, but was raised in Germany from the age of 1 and represented them at U-20 and U-21 level. He would later change his allegiance to Poland and make his international debut for Poland in September 2010.)
32	GK	GER	Ralf Fährmann
33	GK	GER	Toni Tapalović
38	DF	GER	Willi Landgraf

=== Left club during season ===
Note: Flags indicate national team as defined under FIFA eligibility rules; some limited exceptions apply. Players may hold more than one non-FIFA nationality.

No.	Pos.	Nation	Player
1	GK	GER	Frank Rost (to Hamburg)
4	DF	GER	Mathias Abel (on loan to Hamburg)
21	MF	GER	Alexander Baumjohann (to Borussia Mönchengladbach)

No.	Pos.	Nation	Player
26	DF	GER	Niko Bungert (to Kickers Offenbach)
34	MF	GER	Mario Klinger (to KSV Hessen Kassel)

== Transfers ==
=== In ===
- Gustavo Franchin Schiavolin - Paraná, January

=== Out ===
- Christian Poulsen - released, June

== Competitions ==
=== Bundesliga ===
==== League table ====
Pos	Team	Pld	W	D	L	GF	GA	GD	Pts	Qualification or relegation
1	VfB Stuttgart (C)	34	21	7	6	61	37	+24	70	Qualification to Champions League group stage
2	Schalke 04	34	21	5	8	53	32	+21	68	Qualification to Champions League group stage
3	Werder Bremen	34	20	6	8	76	40	+36	66	Qualification to Champions League third qualifying round
4	Bayern Munich	34	18	6	10	55	40	+15	60	Qualification to UEFA Cup first round (Note: Since 1. FC Nürnberg won the 2006–07 DFB-Pokal, thus qualifying for the UEFA Cup first round, Hamburger SV entered the Intertoto Cup third round.)
5	Bayer Leverkusen	34	15	6	13	54	49	+5	51	Qualification to UEFA Cup first round

Source: kicker.de
Rules for classification: 1) Points; 2) Goal difference; 3) Goals scored
(C) Champions

==== Matches ====
- Schalke 04 3-1 Borussia Dortmund
