= 2007–08 FC Schalke 04 season =

FC Schalke 04
2007–08 season
- Manager: Mirko Slomka (until April 13); Mike Büskens and Youri Mulder (from April 14)
- Stadium: Veltins-Arena
- Bundesliga: 3rd
- DFB-Pokal: Third round
- Champions League: Quarter-finals
- Top goalscorer: League: Kevin Kurányi (15); All: Kevin Kurányi (20)
Home colours	Away colours	Third colours

During the 2007–08 German football season, FC Schalke 04 competed in the Bundesliga.

== Season summary ==
Several weak performances, culminating in a 5–1 defeat to Werder Bremen, saw coach Mirko Slomka sacked in April, with former players Mike Büskens and Youri Mulder taking over for the remainder of the season. The duo recorded five wins and a draw in their six-game stint in charge - although Schalke recorded four points less than the previous season and dropped down to third as a result, the club still comfortably qualified for the Champions League, with a ten-point lead over fourth-placed Hamburg. Büskens and Mulder stood down in July, and FC Twente manager Fred Rutten took charge.

== First-team squad ==
Squad at end of season

Note: Flags indicate national team as defined under FIFA eligibility rules; some limited exceptions apply. Players may hold more than one non-FIFA nationality.

No.	Pos.	Nation	Player
1	GK	GER	Manuel Neuer
2	DF	GER	Heiko Westermann
3	DF	GEO	Levan Kobiashvili
4	DF	GER	Mathias Abel
5	DF	BRA	Marcelo Bordon
6	MF	GER	Albert Streit (Note: Streit was born in Bucharest, Romania, but also qualified to represent Germany internationally and has represented them at U-16, U-17, U-18, and B level.)
7	MF	URU	Gustavo Varela
8	MF	GER	Fabian Ernst
9	FW	DEN	Søren Larsen
10	MF	CRO	Ivan Rakitić (Note: Rakitić was born in Möhlin, Switzerland, and represented them at U-21 level, but also qualified to represent Croatia through his parents and made his international debut for Croatia in September 2007.)
11	FW	DEN	Peter Løvenkrands
13	MF	GER	Jermaine Jones (Note: Jones was born in Frankfurt, Germany, and represented them at U-21 and B level, but also qualified to represent the United States through his father and would make his international debut for the United States in October 2010.)
14	MF	GER	Gerald Asamoah (Note: Asamoah was born in Mampong, Ghana, but was raised in Germany from the age of 12 and made his international debut for Germany in May 2001.)
15	MF	BRA	Zé Roberto
18	DF	BRA	Rafinha

No.	Pos.	Nation	Player
19	MF	TUR	Halil Altıntop (Note: Altıntop was born in Gelsenkirchen, Germany, but also qualified to represent Turkey internationally and represented them at U-18, U-20, U-21 and B level before making his international debut for Turkey in 2005.)
20	DF	SRB	Mladen Krstajić (Note: Krstajić was born in Zenica, SFR Yugoslavia (now Bosnia and Herzegovina), but was raised in Serbia and Montenegro (now Serbia) and made his international debut for Serbia and Montenegro in 1999.)
21	MF	URU	Carlos Grossmüller
22	FW	GER	Kevin Kurányi (Note: Kurányi was born in Rio de Janeiro, Brazil, but also qualified to represent Germany internationally through his father and Panama through his mother and represented Germany at U-20, U-21 and B level before making his international debut for Germany in March 2003.)
23	DF	GER	Benedikt Höwedes
24	DF	GER	Christian Pander
25	MF	BIH	Zlatan Bajramović (Note: Bajramović was born in Hamburg, Germany, but also qualified to represent Bosnia and Herzegovina internationally through his parents and made his international debut for Bosnia and Herzegovina in 2002.)
27	MF	URU	Vicente Sánchez
28	MF	GER	Markus Heppke
30	FW	CMR	Dominique Wassi
31	DF	PER	Carlos Zambrano
32	GK	GER	Ralf Fährmann
33	GK	GER	Mathias Schober
34	GK	GER	Toni Tapalović

=== Left club during season ===
Note: Flags indicate national team as defined under FIFA eligibility rules; some limited exceptions apply. Players may hold more than one non-FIFA nationality.

No.	Pos.	Nation	Player
16	DF	URU	Darío Rodríguez (to Peñarol)
17	MF	GER	Mesut Özil (to Werder Bremen)

No.	Pos.	Nation	Player
26	MF	GER	Mimoun Azaouagh (Note: Azaouagh was born in Beni Sidel, Morocco, but was raised in Germany from the age of 1 and represented them at U-21 level.) (on loan to VfL Bochum)
31	DF	GER	Sebastian Boenisch (Note: Boenisch was born in Gliwice, Poland, but was raised in Germany from the age of 1 and represented them at U-20 and U-21 level. He would later change his allegiance to Poland and make his international debut for Poland in September 2010.) (to Werder Bremen)

== Competitions ==
=== Bundesliga ===
==== League table ====
Pos	Team	Pld	W	D	L	GF	GA	GD	Pts	Qualification or relegation
1	Bayern Munich (C)	34	22	10	2	68	21	+47	76	Qualification to Champions League group stage
2	Werder Bremen	34	20	6	8	75	45	+30	66	Qualification to Champions League group stage
3	Schalke 04	34	18	10	6	55	32	+23	64	Qualification to Champions League third qualifying round
4	Hamburger SV	34	14	12	8	47	26	+21	54	Qualification to UEFA Cup first round
5	VfL Wolfsburg	34	15	9	10	58	46	+12	54	Qualification to UEFA Cup first round

Source: www.dfb.de
Rules for classification: 1) points; 2) goal difference; 3) number of goals scored.
(C) Champions

=== UEFA Champions League ===
==== Group stage ====
Pos	Team	Pld	W	D	L	GF	GA	GD	Pts	Qualification	CHE	SCH	ROS	VAL
1	(England) Chelsea	6	3	3	0	9	2	+7	12	Advance to knockout stage	—	2–0	1–1	0–0
2	(Germany) Schalke 04	6	2	2	2	5	4	+1	8	Advance to knockout stage	0–0	—	3–1	0–1
3	(Norway) Rosenborg	6	2	1	3	6	10	−4	7	Transfer to UEFA Cup	0–4	0–2	—	2–0
4	(Spain) Valencia	6	1	2	3	2	6	−4	5		1–2	0–0	0–2	—

Source: RSSSF

18 September 2007 1	Schalke 04 (Germany)	0–1	(Spain) Valencia	Gelsenkirchen, Germany
20:45		Report	Villa 63'	Stadium: Arena AufSchalke; Attendance: 53,951; Referee: Jan Wegereef (Netherlands)

3 October 2007 2	Rosenborg (Norway)	0–2	(Germany) Schalke 04	Trondheim, Norway
20:45		Report	Jones 62'; Kurányi 89'	Stadium: Lerkendal Stadion; Attendance: 21,361; Referee: Grzegorz Gilewski (Poland)

24 October 2007 3	Chelsea (England)	2–0	(Germany) Schalke 04	London, England
20:45	Malouda 4'; Drogba 47'	Report		Stadium: Stamford Bridge; Attendance: 40,910; Referee: Peter Fröjdfeldt (Sweden)

6 November 2007 4	Schalke 04 (Germany)	0–0	(England) Chelsea	Gelsenkirchen, Germany
20:45		Report		Stadium: Arena AufSchalke; Attendance: 53,951; Referee: Massimo Busacca (Switzerland)

28 November 2007 5	Valencia (Spain)	0–0	(Germany) Schalke 04	Valencia, Spain
20:45		Report		Stadium: Mestalla Stadium; Attendance: 29,232; Referee: Frank De Bleeckere (Belgium)

11 December 2007 6	Schalke 04 (Germany)	3–1	(Norway) Rosenborg	Gelsenkirchen, Germany
20:45	Asamoah 12'; Rafinha 19'; Kurányi 36'	Report	Koné 23'	Stadium: Arena AufSchalke; Attendance: 53,951; Referee: Mike Riley (England)

==== Knockout phase ====
===== Round of 16 =====
19 February 2008 First leg	Schalke 04 (Germany)	1–0	(Portugal) Porto	Gelsenkirchen, Germany
20:45	Kurányi 4'	Report		Stadium: Arena AufSchalke; Attendance: 53,951; Referee: Laurent Duhamel (France)

5 March 2008 Second leg	Porto (Portugal)	1–0 (a.e.t.) (1–1 agg.) (1–4 p)	(Germany) Schalke 04	Porto, Portugal
20:45	López 86'	Report		Stadium: Estádio do Dragão; Attendance: 45,316; Referee: Howard Webb (England)
	Penalties
	L. González (penalty scored); Alves (penalty missed); López (penalty missed)		(penalty scored) Rafinha; (penalty scored) Rakitić; (penalty scored) Altıntop; (penalty scored) Jones

===== Quarter-finals =====
1 April 2008 First leg	Schalke 04 (Germany)	0–1	(Spain) Barcelona	Gelsenkirchen, Germany
20:45		Report	Bojan 12'	Stadium: Arena AufSchalke; Attendance: 53,951; Referee: Kyros Vassaras (Greece)

9 April 2008 Second leg	Barcelona (Spain)	1–0 (2–0 agg.)	(Germany) Schalke 04	Barcelona, Spain
20:45	Touré 42'	Report		Stadium: Camp Nou; Attendance: 72,113; Referee: Roberto Rosetti (Italy)
