= David Muller (disambiguation) =

David Muller (born 1964) is an educator.

David Muller may also refer to:

- David A Muller, physicist, electron microscopist
- David Stone (magician) (David Muller, born 1972), French comedian, writer, producer and magician
- David E. Muller (1924–2008), mathematician, computer scientist, inventor of Delay Insensitive Minterm Synthesis
- David Muller, musician in Domino

== See also ==
- David Müller (disambiguation)
