= Alexander Baumjohann =

German footballer (born 1987)

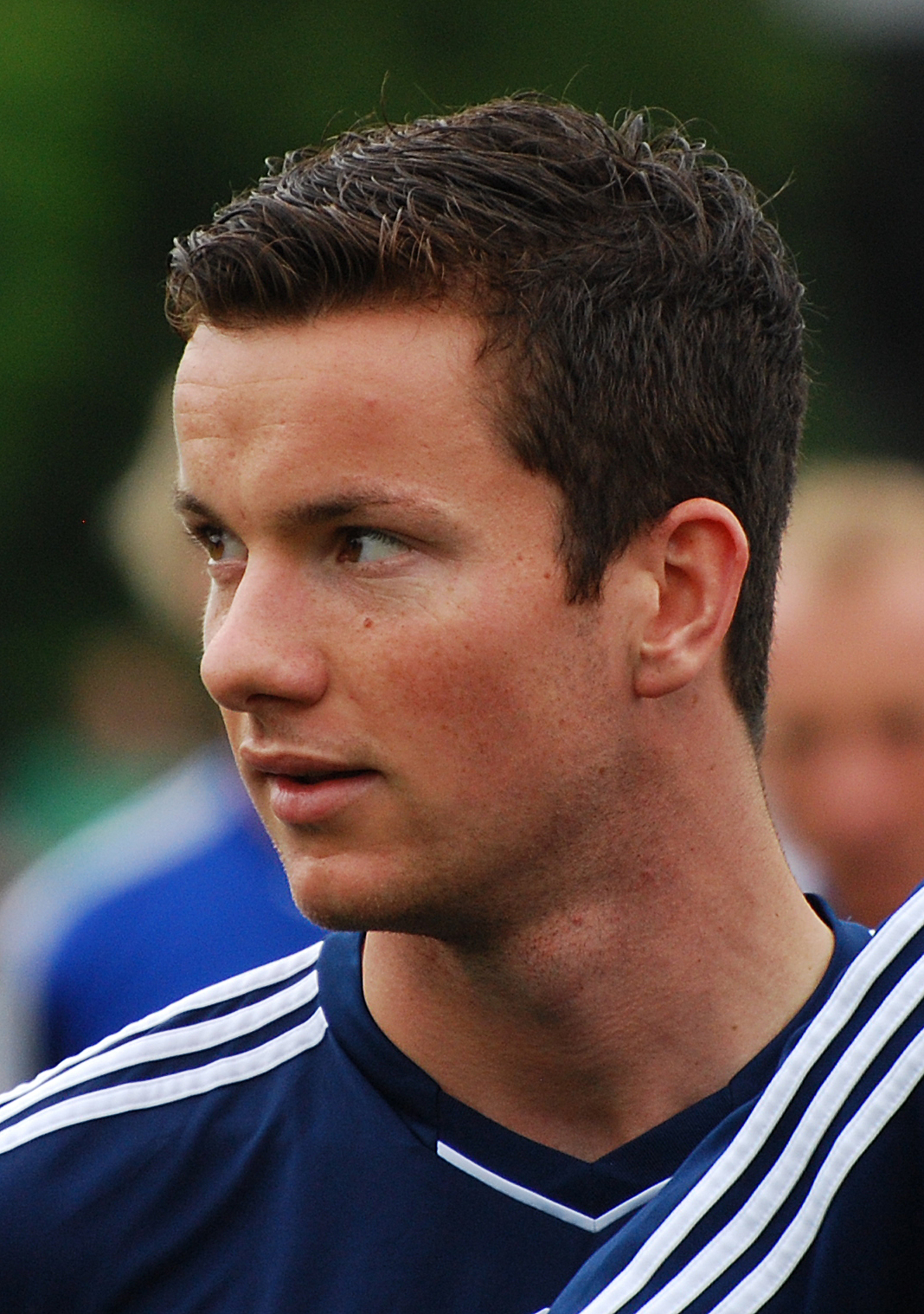
- Baumjohann training with Schalke 04 in 2011

Personal information
- Date of birth: 23 January 1987 (age 39)
- Place of birth: Waltrop, West Germany
- Height: 1.78 m (5 ft 10 in)
- Positions: Attacking midfielder; winger

Youth career
- 1991–2000: Teutonia Waltrop
- 2000–2005: Schalke 04

Senior career*
Years	Team	Apps	(Gls)
2005–2007	Schalke 04 II	29	(5)
2005–2007	Schalke 04	2	(0)
2007–2008	Borussia Mönchengladbach II	8	(2)
2007–2009	Borussia Mönchengladbach	32	(3)
2009–2010	Bayern Munich II	3	(0)
2009–2010	Bayern Munich	3	(0)
2010–2012	Schalke 04	28	(0)
2012–2013	1. FC Kaiserslautern	25	(5)
2013–2017	Hertha BSC	33	(1)
2014–2017	Hertha BSC II	3	(1)
2017	Coritiba	2	(0)
2018	Vitória	3	(0)
2018–2019	Western Sydney Wanderers	19	(3)
2019–2021	Sydney FC	53	(2)

International career
2009	Germany U21	2	(0)
- * Club domestic league appearances and goals as of 3 July 2021

Alexander Baumjohann (born 23 January 1987) is a German footballer who most recently played for Sydney FC as an attacking midfielder. After developing as a star junior with Schalke 04, he moved to Borussia Mönchengladbach and enjoyed great success with the Bundesliga club, earning a move to Bayern Munich in 2009.

A return to Schalke 04 soon followed, where he developed a reputation as an excellent provider, a reputation he further enhanced during spells with 1. FC Kaiserslautern and Hertha BSC. As of May 2018, he had amassed 46 career assists.

Baumjohann moved to Brazil so his wife, who is Brazilian, could be closer to her family. He signed a short-term contract with Coritiba in 2017 before moving to Vitória in 2018.

In 2009, he was twice selected for the Germany U21 team.

After joining the Western Sydney Wanderers in June 2018, he was hailed for his "magnificent" and "brilliant" performances by multiple observers, including manager Markus Babbel.

== Career ==
=== Germany ===
Baumjohann began his youth career in 1991 with Teutonia Waltrop and in summer 2000, joined Schalke 04. After only two appearances in the first team, he was signed by Mönchengladbach in January 2007 on the promise of greater first team exposure. On 27 January 2007, he made his debut with Mönchengladbach against Energie Cottbus.

In July 2009, he moved to Bayern Munich on the recommendation of Jupp Heynckes, who had personally scouted the player. Six months before the move, Heynckes foreshadowed a deal, saying that "Talent makes Alex a 'Bayern player', even though he has yet to make the breakthrough in the Bundesliga." However, after six months with Bayern and sporadic Bundesliga game time, he rejoined FC Schalke.

On 21 August 2012, Baumjohann joined 2. Bundesliga club Kaiserslautern on a one-year contract. In Baumjohann's 27th game for the club, he netted his sixth goal, scoring with a free-kick in a playoff vs. Hoffenheim for a place in the Bundesliga.

On 8 June 2013, it was announced that Baumjohann would leave Kaiserslautern, who had lost to Hoffenheim in their Bundesliga play-off over two legs, for newly promoted Hertha BSC, signing a three-year contract with the capital club. On 18 March 2016, he extended his contract until 2017.

=== Brazil ===
After the 2016–17 season, Baumjohann considered playing in Brazil, the country of his wife. In July 2017, he signed with Coritiba. Having limited playing time at Coritiba due to a broken hand, Baumjohann left the club after its relegation, although he wanted to renew his contract. In 2018, he joined Vitória.

=== Australia ===
On 9 August 2018, Baumjohann was brought to the A-League by coach Markus Babbel, signing with Western Sydney Wanderers. At the end of the season, the Wanderers released Baumjohann, choosing not to renew his contract.

On 2 June 2019, Baumjohann signed a two-year deal with local rivals Sydney FC. Baumjohann enjoyed one of the best periods of his career, becoming a regular starter with the Sky Blues as they finished as Champions in the 2019–20 A-League season and runner-up in the 2020-21 A-League season.

Two days after setting the opening goal of the 2021 A-League Grand Final, Baumjohann announced that he would be departing the club.

Currently, he holds an executive role as the Head of Player Management for Sydney FC following his departure from professional football.

== Career statistics ==
As of 1 September 2022

Club performance		League			Cup		Continental		Other		Total	
Club	Season	Division	Apps	Goals	Apps	Goals	Apps	Goals	Apps	Goals	Apps	Goals
Schalke 04	2005–06	Bundesliga	1	0	0	0	1	0	0	0	2	0
Schalke 04	2006–07	Bundesliga	1	0	0	0	0	0	1 (Note: Appearance in the German League Cup)	0	2	0
Schalke 04	Totals		2	0	0	0	1	0	1	0	4	0
Schalke 04 II	2006–07	Oberliga Westfalen	13	4	—		—		—		13	4
Borussia Mönchengladbach	2006–07	Bundesliga	3	0	0	0	—		—		3	0
Borussia Mönchengladbach	2007–08	2. Bundesliga	1	0	0	0	—		—		1	0
Borussia Mönchengladbach	2008–09	Bundesliga	28	3	2	0	—		—		30	3
Borussia Mönchengladbach	Totals		32	3	2	0	—		—		34	3
Borussia Mönchengladbach II	2006–07	Regionalliga Nord	2	0	—		—		—		2	0
Borussia Mönchengladbach II	2007–08	Oberliga Nordrhein	4	1	—		—		—		4	1
Borussia Mönchengladbach II	2008–09	Regionalliga West	2	1	—		—		—		2	1
Borussia Mönchengladbach II	Totals		8	2	—		—		—		8	2
Bayern Munich	2009–10	Bundesliga	3	0	1	0	0	0	—		4	0
Bayern Munich II	2009–10	3. Liga	3	0	—		—		—		3	0
Schalke 04	2009–10	Bundesliga	11	0	2	0	—		—		13	0
Schalke 04	2010–11	Bundesliga	9	0	0	0	4	0	0	0	13	0
Schalke 04	2011–12	Bundesliga	8	0	2	0	6	0	1 (Note: Appearance in the German Super Cup)	0	17	0
Schalke 04	Totals		28	0	4	0	10	0	1	0	43	0
Schalke 04 II	2010–11	Regionalliga West	4	0	—		—		—		4	0
Kaiserslautern	2012–13	2. Bundesliga	25	5	1	0	—		2 (Note: Appearances in the Bundesliga relegation play-offs)	1	28	6
Hertha BSC	2013–14	Bundesliga	9	0	1	0	—		—		10	0
Hertha BSC	2014–15	Bundesliga	0	0	1	0	—		—		1	0
Hertha BSC	2015–16	Bundesliga	24	1	3	0	—		—		27	1
Hertha BSC	Totals		33	1	5	0	0	0	—		38	1
Hertha BSC II	2013–14	Regionalliga Nordost	1	0	—		—		—		1	0
Hertha BSC II	2016–17	Regionalliga Nordost	3	1	—		—		—		3	1
Hertha BSC II	Totals		4	1	—		—		—		4	1
Coritiba	2017	Brazilian Serie A	2	0	0	0	—		—		2	0
Vitória	2018	Brazilian Serie A	3	0	1	0	—		7 (Note: Appearances in the Campeonato Baiano and Copa do Nordeste)	1	11	1
Western Sydney Wanderers	2018–19	A-League	20	3	3	1	—		—		23	4
Sydney FC	2019–20	A-League	26	1	0	0	6	0	—		32	1
Sydney FC	2020–21	A-League	27	1	0	0	0	0	0	0	27	1
Sydney FC	Total		53	2	0	0	6	0	0	0	53	2
Career totals			233	21	17	1	17	0	11	2	278	24

== Honours ==
=== Club ===
Schalke 04

- DFL-Ligapokal: 2005
- DFB-Pokal: 2010–11
- DFL-Supercup: 2011

Sydney FC

- A-League Championship: 2019–20
- A-League Premiership: 2019–20

== Personal life ==
Baumjohann grew up in Waltrop, and attended the Gesamtschule Berger Feld.

In addition to his native German, Baumjohann can also speak Portuguese. Residing in Australia since his 2018 transfer, he now holds an Australian passport.

Baumjohann has a wife and two daughters.
