= Manuel Neuer =

German footballer (born 1986)

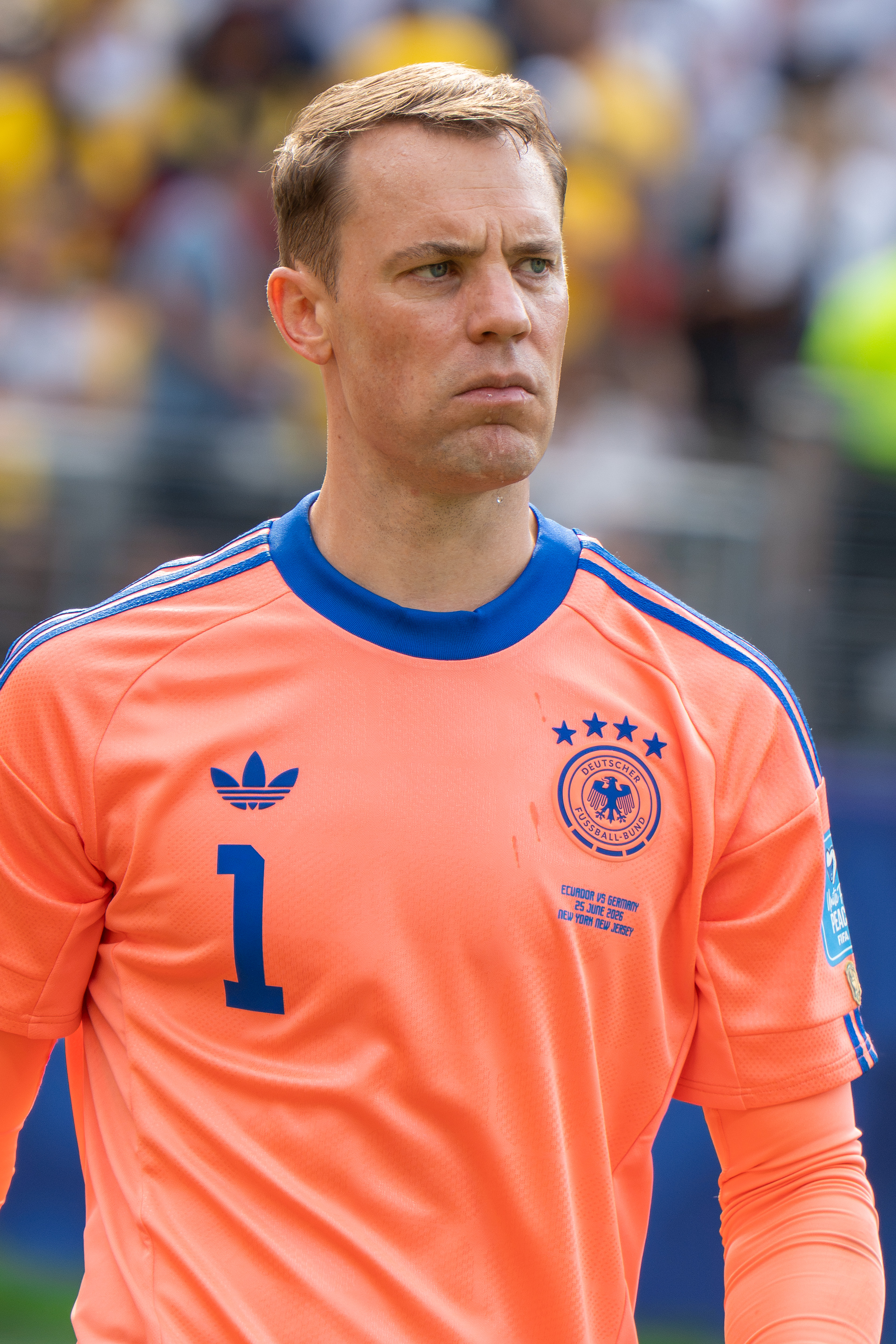
- Neuer with Germany in 2026

Personal information
- Full name: Manuel Peter Neuer
- Date of birth: 27 March 1986 (age 40)
- Place of birth: Gelsenkirchen, West Germany
- Height: 1.93 m (6 ft 4 in)
- Position: Goalkeeper

Team information
- Current team: Bayern Munich
- Number: 1

Youth career
- 1991–2005: Schalke 04

Senior career*
Years	Team	Apps	(Gls)
2004–2006	Schalke 04 II	26	(0)
2005–2011	Schalke 04	156	(0)
2011–	Bayern Munich	394	(0)

International career
2004	Germany U18	1	(0)
2004–2005	Germany U19	11	(0)
2005–2006	Germany U20	4	(0)
2006–2009	Germany U21	20	(0)
2009–2026	Germany	128	(0)
Medal record
Men's football
Representing Germany
FIFA World Cup
Winner	2014 Brazil
Bronze medal – third place	2010 South Africa
UEFA European Championship
Bronze medal – third place	2012 Poland–Ukraine
UEFA European Under-21 Championship
Winner	2009 Sweden
- * Club domestic league appearances and goals as of 16:28, 7 November 2026 (UTC)

Manuel Peter Neuer (Note: German pronunciation: [ˈmaːnu̯eːl ˈnɔʏ.ɐ, -ɛl -]) (born 27 March 1986) is a German professional footballer who plays as a goalkeeper for and captains Bundesliga club Bayern Munich. Widely regarded as one of the greatest and most influential goalkeepers of all time, (Note: Attributed to multiple references:) he has been described as a "sweeper-keeper" because of his playing style and speed when rushing off his line to anticipate opponents, often going out of the penalty area. Neuer was named the best goalkeeper of the decade from 2011 to 2020 by IFFHS.

Neuer started his career at Schalke 04 where he won the DFB-Pokal and DFL-Ligapokal, and was appointed club captain in 2010. In 2011, he signed for Bayern Munich and has since won 32 trophies, including a record thirteen Bundesliga titles, multiple domestic titles and two UEFA Champions League titles in 2013 and 2020, both as part of trebles, being the only goalkeeper in history to achieve the European treble twice, additionally winning the second as club captain. In 2014, Neuer finished third in the voting for the FIFA Ballon d'Or award behind Cristiano Ronaldo and Lionel Messi. He was awarded the Best European Goalkeeper a record five times, and the IFFHS World's Best Goalkeeper a joint-record five times, alongside Gianluigi Buffon and Iker Casillas. He was also named the Best FIFA Goalkeeper in 2020.

Neuer has set numerous records, especially in the Bundesliga, the major league in German football. He has the most clean sheets recorded in the competition, with 224. He also holds the most clean sheets in a single season, with 21 in the 2015–16 campaign. Furthermore, he was the fastest player to reach 100 Bundesliga clean sheets, doing so after only 183 appearances. Neuer is the only goalkeeper in Bundesliga history with more than 100 appearances to have conceded fewer goals than matches played.

In international football he holds the record for the most appearances by a goalkeeper at the FIFA World Cup. A former Germany youth international, Neuer made his debut for the senior team in 2009, and was first-choice goalkeeper for the 2010 FIFA World Cup. Four years later, Neuer won the 2014 tournament with Germany as well as the Golden Glove award for being the best goalkeeper in the tournament, and was named in its All-Star Team and Dream Team. Serving as captain from 2017 to 2023, he also represented his country at the World Cups in 2018, 2022, and 2026 as well as at the UEFA European Championships in 2012, 2016, 2020, and 2024. Neuer is the fifth-most capped German international of all time, and holds the team's record for most appearances at European Championships and at international tournaments.

== Club career ==
=== Schalke 04 ===
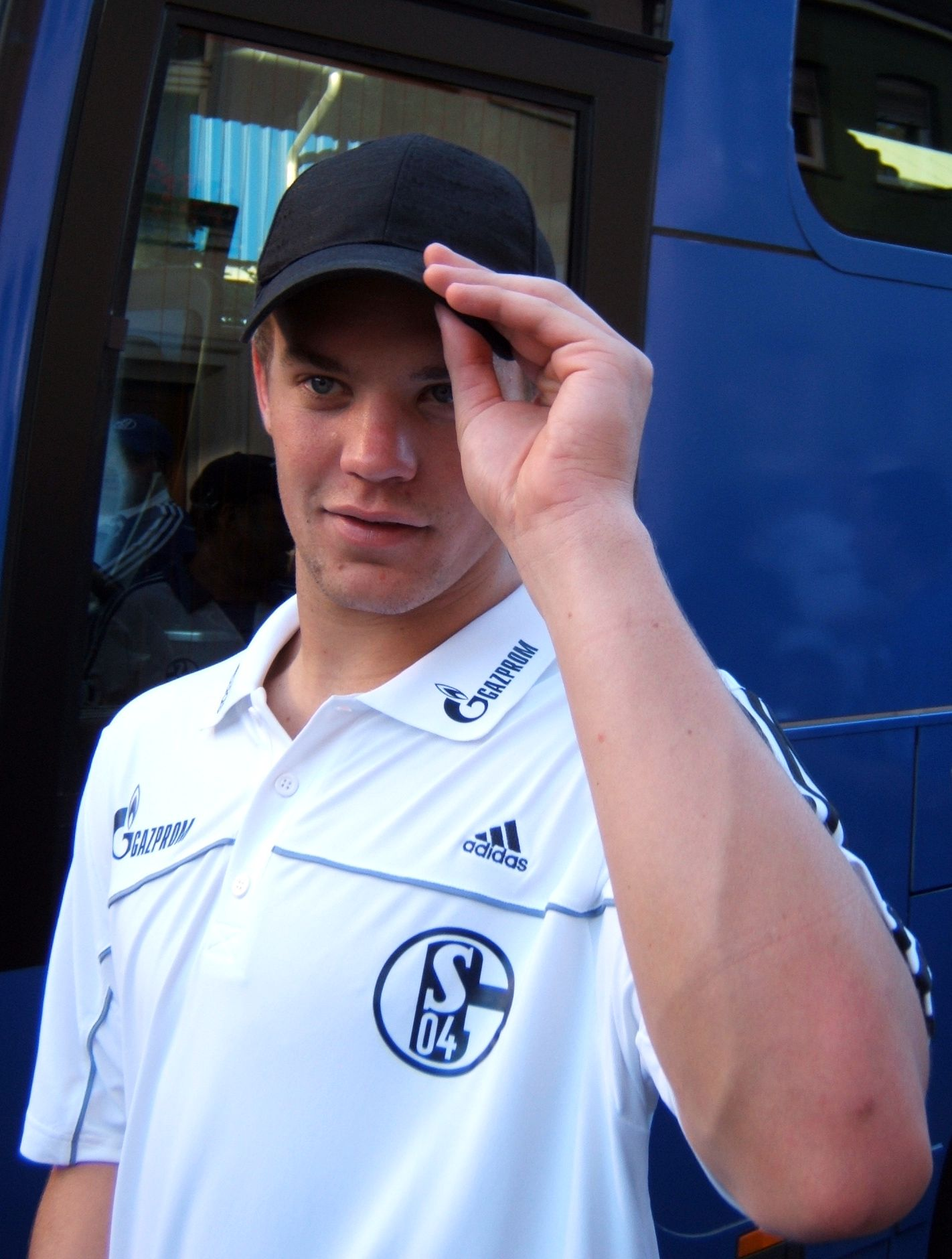
Neuer with Schalke 04 in 2007

Neuer played for Schalke 04 II during 2003–04, 2004–05, 2006–07, 2007–08 and 2008–09. Neuer progressed through every age group at his hometown club, Schalke 04, and signed professional terms in 2005. Neuer did not make any first team appearances during the 2005–06 season. However, he was on the bench several times and won the 2005 DFL-Ligapokal as an unused substitute. He made his Bundesliga debut with Schalke when he came on as a substitute for the injured Frank Rost on matchday 2 of the 2006–07 season. The 20-year-old eventually won the starting position when Rost was surprisingly dropped for the clash against Bayern Munich. Neuer managed to secure a 2–2 draw against the defending champions. He made 27 league appearances during the 2006–07 season. Despite his young age, he was widely tipped to be a potential successor to his former idol Jens Lehmann in the future for the Germany national team.

Neuer started the 2007–08 season by playing in three matches in the German League Cup. On 5 March 2008, in the first knockout round of the UEFA Champions League against Porto, he almost single-handedly kept Schalke in the game with several saves, forcing the game into penalties. He then saved penalties from Bruno Alves and Lisandro López to help Schalke advance to the quarter-finals. He was shortlisted for the 2007–08 UEFA Club Goalkeeper of the Year award; he was the youngest as well as the only Bundesliga goalkeeper on the list. He was one of only three Bundesliga players to play every minute in the 2007–08 season. He finished the season by making 50 appearances in all competitions.

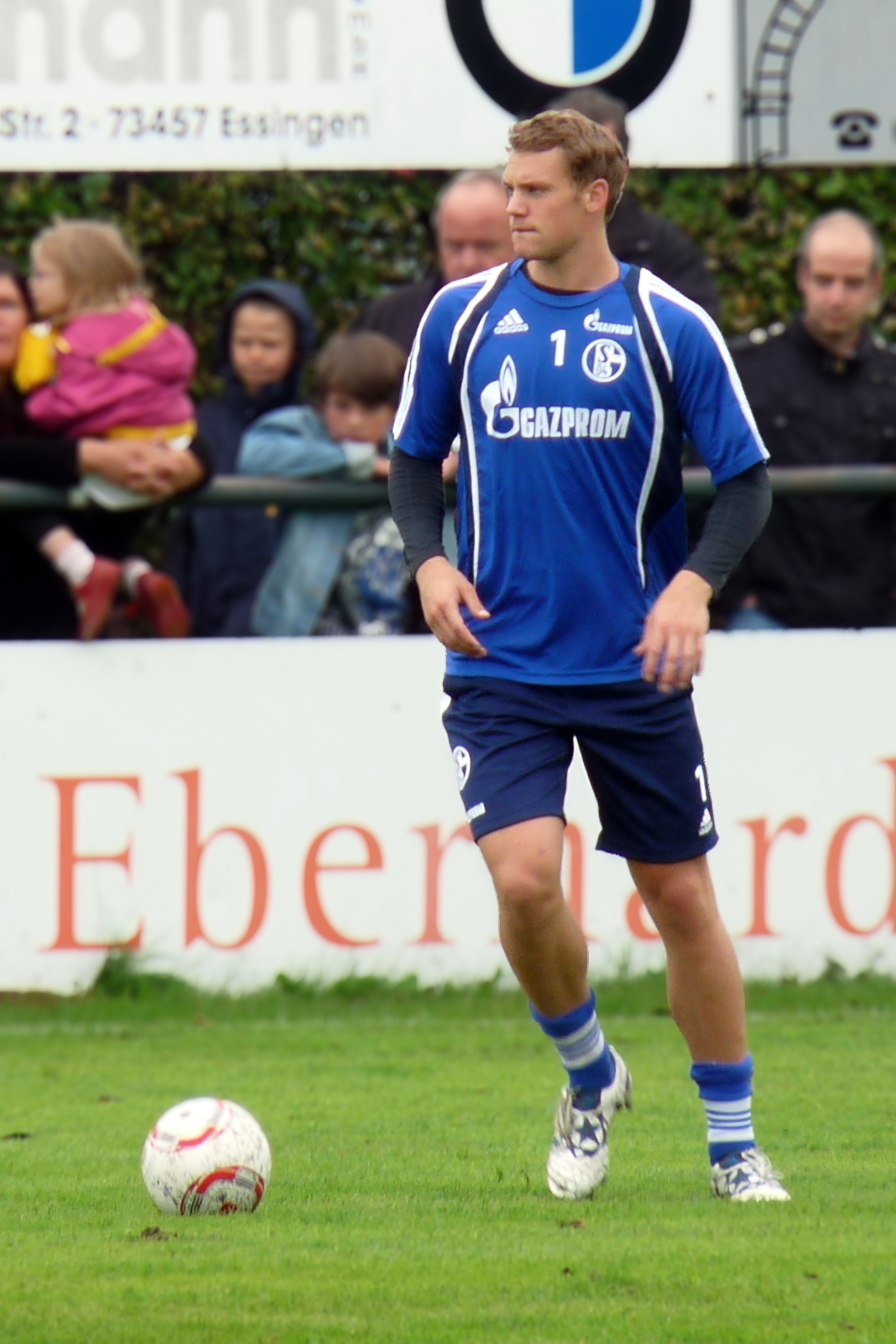
Neuer training with Schalke in 2010

In the 2008–09 season, Schalke finished eighth in the league table and missed out on a Europa League spot. However, his showing at the 2009 UEFA European Under-21 Championship sparked interest from Bayern Munich, with Bayern chairman Karl-Heinz Rummenigge declaring interest in signing the young goalkeeper. Schalke's new manager Felix Magath, however, insisted that Neuer would play for Schalke in the next season. In November, he was the only German goalkeeper in the list of five nominated goalkeepers for the UEFA Team of the Year. Neuer finished the 2009–10 season with 39 appearances.

For the 2010–11 season, Neuer was appointed captain and led the team to its first Champions League semi-final appearance to play against Manchester United. He also won the DFB-Pokal in his final season with the club, as Schalke defeated MSV Duisburg 5–0. On 20 April 2011, he announced that he would not be extending his contract with Schalke, which was set to expire at the end of the 2011–12 season. Neuer finished the season with 53 appearances.

=== Bayern Munich ===
==== 2011–13: Transfer and treble winner ====
On 1 June 2011, Neuer made his move to Bayern Munich and signed a five-year contract that lasted until June 2016. Following initial hostility from Bayern fans towards Neuer, as some fans were unhappy about Bayern buying a Schalke keeper, a round-table discussion between Bayern and group of supporters' representatives took place on 2 July 2011. It was decided that Neuer "would be regarded as a full member of Bayern Munich, who should be treated with due respect. Furthermore, hostility towards him should cease". In the first weeks at Bayern, after a 0–0 draw with 1899 Hoffenheim, Neuer broke the Bayern Munich record for most competitive clean sheets in a row, having gone over 1,000 minutes without conceding, beating the record formerly held by Oliver Kahn.

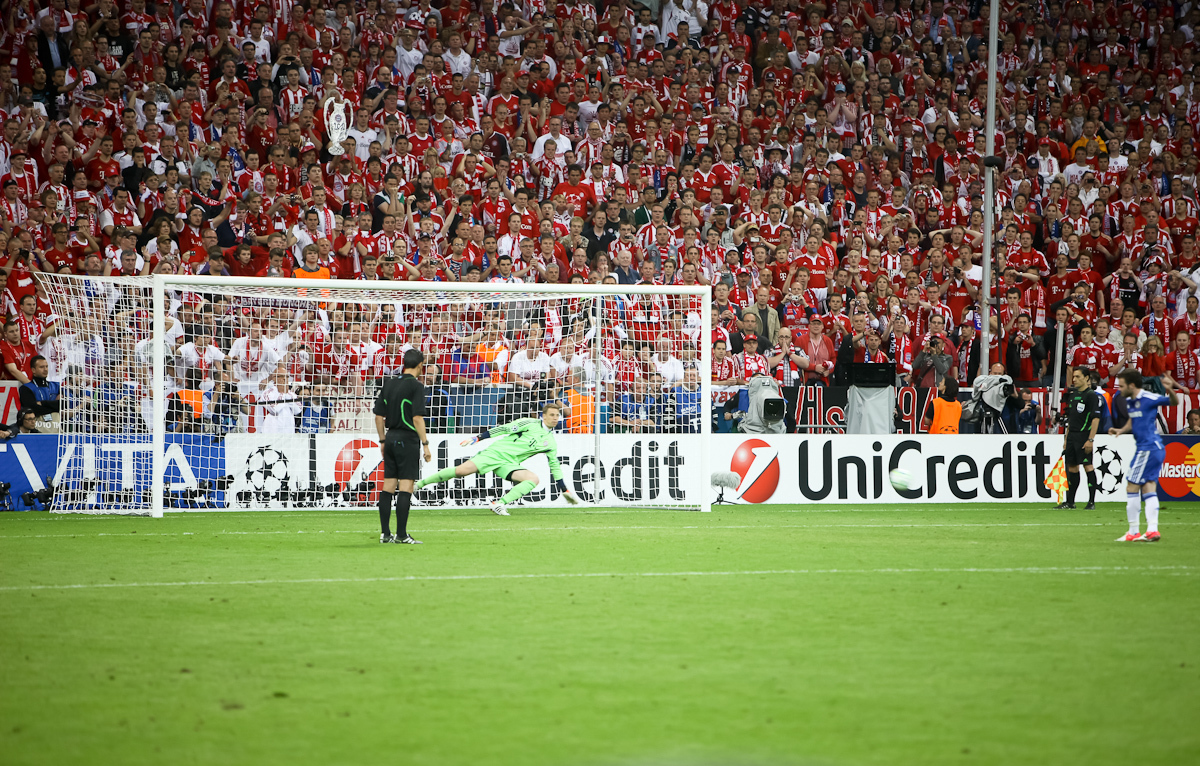
Neuer saving Juan Mata's penalty kick in the 2012 UEFA Champions League Final

On 25 April 2012, in the second leg of the 2011–12 Champions League semi-finals against Real Madrid, Neuer saved penalty kicks from both Cristiano Ronaldo and Kaká. Following the match, Neuer revealed that he studied the way Ronaldo took his penalties. Neuer told in a press interview: "I always prepare myself for such situations. Our goalkeeping coach, Toni Tapalović, showed me on his laptop before the match how Ronaldo usually takes his penalties. I learned that Ronaldo prefers to send the ball low to his left. In the penalty shoot-out, I was convinced that he would aim for his favourite spot."

Bayern Munich went on to progress to the 2012 UEFA Champions League Final against Chelsea, which also went to a penalty shoot-out after a 1–1 draw. Neuer took and scored the third penalty for Bayern and also saved the first penalty taken by Juan Mata, but could not save the rest of the penalties as Munich lost the trophy 4–3 on penalties in their home stadium, the Allianz Arena. Neuer finished the season with 53 appearances.

Neuer started the season by winning the 2012 DFL-Supercup. In the 2012–13 UEFA Champions League knockout phase, Neuer posted four clean sheets in a row versus both Juventus and Barcelona. In the 2013 Champions League Final against Borussia Dortmund, Neuer posted eight saves en route to Bayern's fifth Champions League title. The game featured several saves from both keepers, and Neuer won the duel against Roman Weidenfeller having only conceded once to İlkay Gündoğan on a penalty shot. Neuer finished the season with 31 Bundesliga appearances, five German Cup appearances, 13 UEFA Champions League appearances, and a German Super Cup appearance.

==== 2013–16: Ballon d'Or nomination, domestic success ====
Neuer started the season by losing in the 2013 DFL-Supercup to Borussia Dortmund. For the 2013 UEFA Super Cup, on 30 August 2013, he saved the last and decisive penalty which saw Bayern Munich win the match against Chelsea, taking some revenge for the lost 2012 UEFA Champions League final. In the FIFA Club World Cup, Neuer played against Guangzhou Evergrande in the semi-final and Raja Casablanca in the final. Neuer was announced as the 2013 World Goalkeeper of The Year on 7 January 2014. On 9 February, Bayern faced Arsenal in the Champions League knockout phase and Neuer saved the penalty from Mesut Özil in the first half. Bayern went on to win the game 2–0 away. On 2 May 2014, Neuer extended his contract until the summer of 2019. Neuer finished the season with 31 Bundesliga appearances, five German Cup appearances, 12 UEFA Champions League appearances, one German Super Cup appearance, one UEFA Super Cup appearance, and two FIFA Club World Cup appearances for a total of 52 appearances.

Neuer won the Footballer of the Year prize, was voted into the UEFA Team of the Year, and finished third in the FIFA Ballon d'Or. Neuer started the season by winning the 2014 DFL-Supercup against Borussia Dortmund. On 30 January 2015, Neuer started on matchday 18, where Bayern lost to VfL Wolfsburg 4–1. This was the first league match since joining Bayern in 2011 where he had given up four goals in a match. The last time Bayern had conceded four goals in a match was against Wolfsburg on 4 April 2009. On 28 April 2015, Neuer was one of four Bayern players to miss in a 2–0 penalty shootout defeat to Borussia Dortmund in the DFB-Pokal semi-final. Neuer finished the season with 32 Bundesliga appearances, five German Cup appearances, 12 UEFA Champions League appearances, and one German Super Cup appearance for a total of 50 appearances.

The 2015–16 season commenced with the DFL-Supercup, where Neuer started for Bayern against VfL Wolfsburg in a match which ended in a 1–1 draw. Wolfsburg won the subsequent shootout. On 20 April 2016, Neuer extended his contract with Bayern until 2021. Neuer finished the season with 34 Bundesliga appearances, five German Cup appearances, 11 UEFA Champions League appearances, and one German Supercup appearance for a total of 51 appearances.

==== 2016–20: Club captain and second treble ====
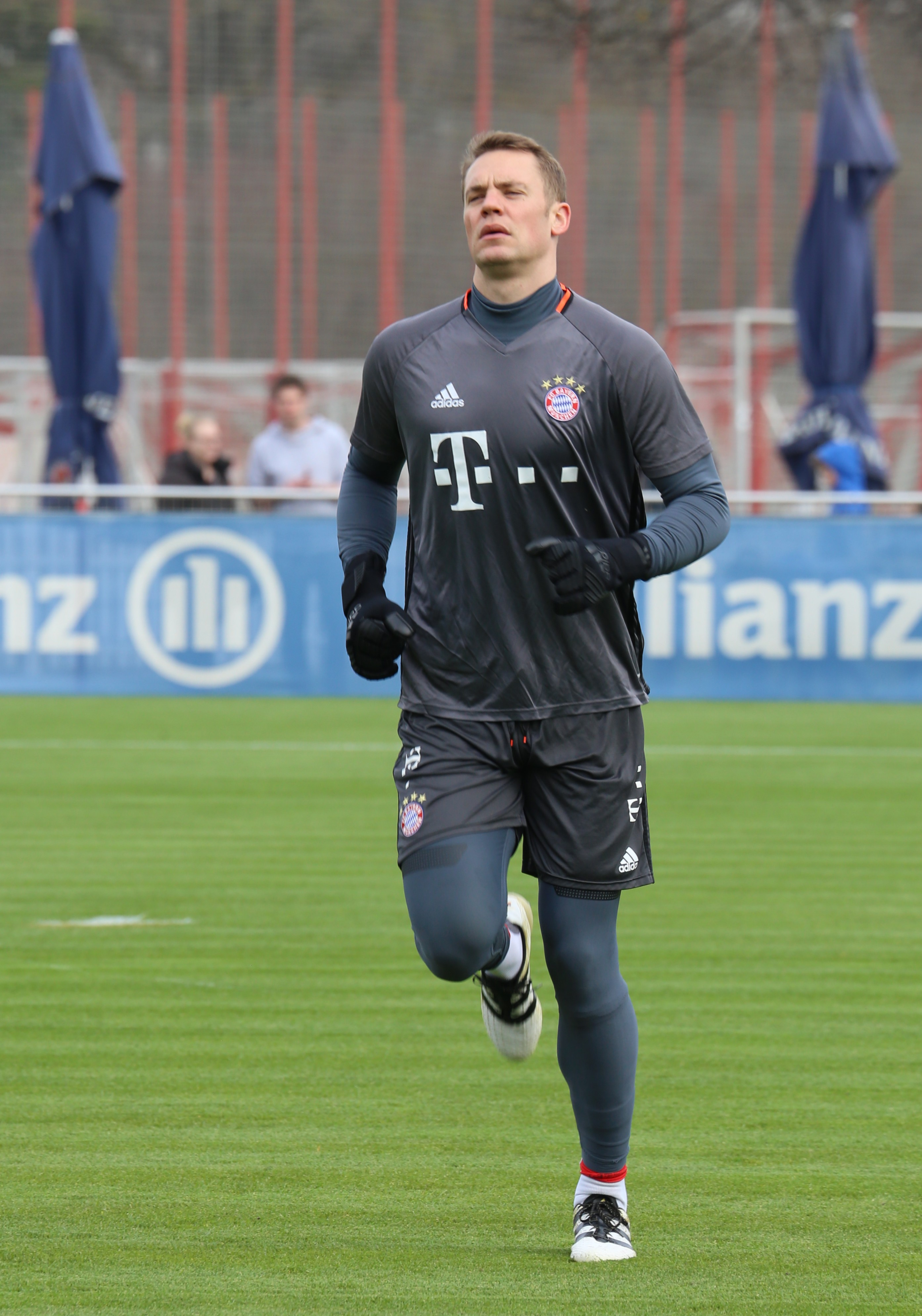
Neuer training with Bayern in 2017

Neuer's season began with a 2–0 win over Borussia Dortmund at the 2016 DFL-Supercup as Bayern won the title for the first time in three years, and he kept a clean sheet in the Bundesliga opener as Bayern grabbed a 6–0 win over Werder Bremen. In January 2017, he was voted into the FIFA Team of the Year alongside fellow German and former Bayern teammate Toni Kroos. Neuer conceded twice in Bayern's matches against Arsenal as the Bavarians beat the English team with an impressive 10–2 aggregate in the round of 16 of the 2016–17 UEFA Champions League. Neuer was then praised for his performance in their first game of the quarterfinals against Real Madrid, although Bayern lost 1–2 to the Spanish club. During the second leg, he suffered a left foot fracture that ended his season abruptly as Bayern lost 4–2 in a controversial match. Bayern ended the season as Bundesliga champions. In addition to playing in the DFL-Supercup, Neuer played in 26 Bundesliga matches, four German Cup matches, and nine Champions League matches.

On 19 July 2017, it was announced that Neuer would become the new captain for both Bayern and the Germany national team following Philipp Lahm's retirement. Neuer played his first game of the season on Bundesliga matchday 2 after recovering from a foot injury that occurred in April during a Champions League game versus Real Madrid. On 13 September 2017, Neuer made his 100th European appearance in a Champions League match as his side won 3–0 over Anderlecht. It was announced in September that Neuer would be ruled out until January 2018 after another fracture to the same foot again. After series of delays on his comeback, he finally rejoined team training with Bayern Munich on 20 April 2018 after seven months away, although he had begun goalkeeping-specific training in early April. Neuer was included in the matchday squad for the first time since his injury in the DFB-Pokal final against Eintracht Frankfurt but he was an unused substitute. Neuer finished the season with three Bundesliga matches and a Champions League match.

On 12 August 2018, Neuer captained his side in the first competitive match of the season as Bayern won the 2018 DFL-Supercup by defeating Eintracht Frankfurt with a 5–0 victory. On 24 August, Neuer played his first Bundesliga game in 341 days when he captained Bayern in a 3–1 victory season opener against Hoffenheim. On 14 April 2019, Neuer sustained a torn muscle fibres in his left calf in a Bundesliga match against Fortuna Düsseldorf. Due to the injury, Neuer missed six matches for Bayern in the closing stages of the season.

On 18 May 2019, Neuer won his seventh consecutive Bundesliga title as Bayern finished two points above Dortmund. A week later, Neuer returned from injury and won his fifth DFB-Pokal as Bayern defeated RB Leipzig 3–0 in the 2019 DFB-Pokal Final. Neuer finished the season with 26 Bundesliga matches, 3 German Cup matches and 8 Champions League matches. Neuer's 2019–20 started with a 2–0 loss to Borussia Dortmund in the German Super Cup on 3 August 2019. On 21 May 2020, Neuer signed a new contract with Bayern, keeping him at the club until 2023. On 23 August, Neuer won the Champions League for the second time, his first as Bayern captain, keeping a clean sheet as his team won 1–0 over PSG. He was widely praised for his performance. He finished the season with 33 Bundesliga appearances, six German Cup appearances, and 11 UEFA Champions League appearances.

==== 2020–present: The Sextuple and new records ====
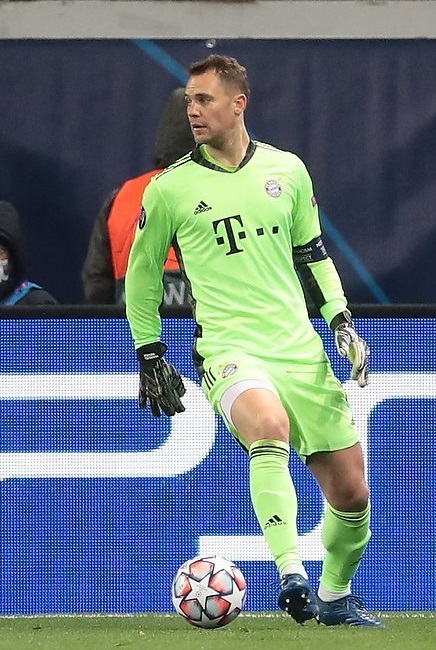
Neuer playing for Bayern in 2020

On 24 September 2020, Neuer saved a one-on-one chance from Sevilla's Youssef En-Nesyri in the 87th minute in the 2020 UEFA Super Cup, which Bayern Munich won 2–1 after extra-time. Six days later, Neuer won the German Super Cup. On 21 October 2020, Neuer reached his 200th clean sheet with Bayern in 394 matches in a 4–0 win over Atlético Madrid in the 2020–21 UEFA Champions League. His record surpassed Sepp Maier (199 clean sheets in 651 games), with only Oliver Kahn (247 clean sheets in 632 matches) ahead of Neuer. On 28 August 2021, Neuer had his 205th clean sheet in Bundesliga in 441 matches, breaking Oliver Kahn's record of 204 clean sheets in 557 matches.

Neuer's 300th Bundesliga victory came in his 447th Bundesliga game on 23 October 2021. Bayern won the Bundesliga during the 2021–22 season with three games to spare. After the season, Neuer extended his contract with Bayern Munich until 2024. In the beginning of the 2022–23 season, he kept clean sheets in all his three matches in the Champions League, and four in 12 Bundesliga appearances. On 10 December 2022, Neuer announced that he broke his leg during a ski trip at Roßkopf on Spitzingsee in Bavaria, which would force him to miss the rest of the season.

On 28 October 2023, Neuer played for the first time in 350 days, in a match which ended in an 8–0 victory over Darmstadt. A month later, he extended his contract with Bayern Munich until 30 June 2025. On 12 January 2024, in a 3–0 win over Hoffenheim, Neuer played his 500th match for Bayern to go level with Bastian Schweinsteiger in tenth place in the club's all-time appearance rankings. On 5 March, he equalled Iker Casillas' record of 57 clean sheets in the Champions League, following a 3–0 win over Lazio during the round of 16 of the competition. On 17 April, he managed to break the previous record, by securing his 58th clean sheet in a 1–0 victory over Arsenal in the quarter-finals second leg. In the Champions League semi-final second leg, he produced decisive saves against Real Madrid, before losing the ball in the 88th minute which led to conceding the equalizer, followed by another stoppage time goal and a 4–3 defeat on aggregate, preventing the 2013-rematch of Der Klassiker in the final in Wembley. On 12 May, he featured in his 500th Bundesliga match, becoming the fourth goalkeeper to achieve this feat following Oliver Kahn, Eike Immel and Uli Stein.

On 30 October 2024, Neuer celebrated his 250th clean sheet with Bayern Munich in all competitions, following a 4–0 away win against Mainz in the DFB-Pokal. Later that year, on 3 December, in the round of 16 of the DFB-Pokal against Bayer Leverkusen, Neuer received a straight red card for a body-check on Jeremie Frimpong outside the box in the 17th minute. It was his first in 866 matches and over 20 seasons of his professional career for club and country. On 3 February 2025, Neuer extended his contract with Bayern until June 2026. He played his 150th Champions League match for Bayern Munich against Leverkusen on 5 March 2025.

At the end of the season, Neuer would participate at the newly reconstructed Club World Cup in the US, featuring in all of Bayern's five matches and eventually getting knocked out by Champions League winners Paris Saint-Germain 2–0 in the quarter-final in Atlanta, Georgia.

On 17 September 2025, Neuer became the oldest Bayern player to appear in a Champions League match, aged 39 years and 174 days. He set the record during Bayern's 3–1 victory over Chelsea in the opening game of the 2025–26 season, surpassing the previous mark held by Lothar Matthäus. In addition, he recorded his 100th victory in the European competition, becoming only the fourth player to reach this milestone.

In the following months Neuer and fellow goalkeeper Jonas Urbig would share their goal several times, either due to job sharing or minor injures from Neuer, with Urbig playing most of the domestic cup matches, as well as few league and CL match-ups. On 4 November, Neuer would win Man of the Match and help his team win 2–1 away against title holders PSG in the Champions League league phase.

After returning from a previously sustained muscle injury on 6 March 2026, Neuer would injure his muscle in his left calf again, getting subbed off during half-time. He would miss the rest of March, including the Champions League round of 16 matches against Atalanta. He would return to goal on 4 April, in a spectacular 3–2 away victory over SC Freiburg, completing a Remontada after being 0–2 down by the 80th minute. It would be his first match after having turned 40 years a week prior, becoming only the 11th player and 6th goalkeeper in Bundesliga history to reach this feat.

On 7 April 2026, in the Champions League quarter-final first leg, Neuer registered 9 saves and several clearances outside of the box, once more showing his skills as a sweeper-keeper and helping his team win 2–1 in the Bernabéu against Real Madrid, winning Man of the Match for the second time in that competition's season. It was also his most saves in a UCL knockout game since April 2017, when he made 10 – also against Real Madrid. The result also marked his first victory at the Bernabéu, as it was his club's first win there since May 2001, and his first win over Real Madrid since April 2012. In the second leg, he caused a goal 35 seconds into the match, passing the ball to the opponent outside of the penalty area, with Arda Güler receiving the ball and scoring a long-range volley to tie the game on aggregate. His side still won the match 4–3 at home and advanced to the semi-final. On 19 April, he achieved his 13th Bundesliga title, equaling the record of his former teammate Thomas Müller. On 28 April, he conceded five goals in the Champions League semi-final first leg against Paris Saint-Germain in a historic 5–4 away loss. Neuer registered six saves in the second leg, which ended 1–1. On 15 May, Neuer renewed his contract for another season until 2027.

On 28 August 2026, Neuer played his 600th match for the club in a 5–1 victory over VfB Stuttgart, becoming the fifth player to achieve this feat. He also featured in his 21st consecutive Bundesliga season, placing him just one season behind Klaus Fichtel for the all-time record.

== International career ==
=== Youth ===
After progressing through the youth teams, Neuer made his Germany under-21 debut on 15 August 2006 against the Netherlands. He won the 2009 UEFA European Under-21 Championship with Germany in Sweden and kept a clean sheet in the 4–0 win in the final against England.

=== 2010 FIFA World Cup ===
In May 2009, Neuer was called up to the senior German squad for a tour of Asia. After being named on the substitutes bench for a 1–1 draw with China on 29 May, Neuer made his debut in a match against the United Arab Emirates on 2 June, playing the full 90 minutes of a 7–2 win in Dubai.

On 17 November, one week after the suicide of Robert Enke, Neuer made his home debut for the Germany senior team at the Arena AufSchalke in a 2–2 draw with Ivory Coast. Twelve minutes after replacing Tim Wiese as a half-time substitute, Neuer kicked a clearance against Ivorian player Emmanuel Eboué to concede an equalising goal. Although Neuer took responsibility for the goal, manager Joachim Löw called the error "unlucky".

On 4 May 2010, it was announced that René Adler, who was expected to be Germany's starting goalkeeper at the 2010 FIFA World Cup, would be absent from the tournament due to a rib injury. Two days later, Neuer was named as one of the three goalkeepers in the squad for the tournament, alongside Tim Wiese and Hans-Jörg Butt. On 28 May, Löw confirmed that Neuer would be Germany's starting goalkeeper at the World Cup.

Neuer made his competitive debut for Germany in the team's opening match of the tournament, keeping a clean sheet as the team beat Australia 4–0 on 14 June. During the group stage, he only conceded a single goal, a close range shot by Milan Jovanović in the 1–0 loss to Serbia. In the round of 16, he provided the assist for Miroslav Klose's opening goal against England, winning 4–1, becoming the first goalkeeper in World Cup history to be involved in a goal since detailed statistics have been recorded. In the same match, England's Frank Lampard had a goal disallowed after his shot hit the crossbar and bounced past the goal line. Controversially, Neuer admitted that he knew it was a legitimate goal, but acted in a way to make the referee doubt this. He played in all of Germany's World Cup matches apart from the third-place game against Uruguay, when Hans-Jörg Butt was selected to start.

=== UEFA Euro 2012 ===
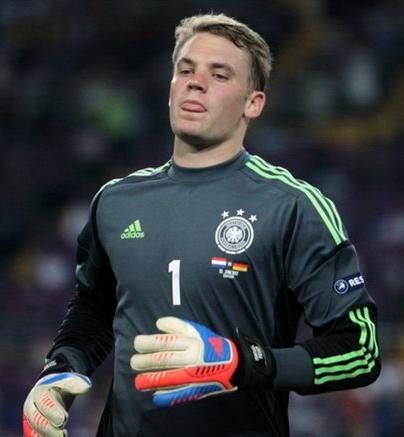
Neuer in action for Germany in their Euro 2012 group stage match against the Netherlands on 13 June

Neuer played every minute of every match in the UEFA Euro 2012 qualifying campaign, helping Germany to secure ten wins out of ten games and top their group. After Germany's 3–1 away win against Turkey, he was especially praised for his "sensational" performance. He retained a close range volley shot by Hamit Altıntop, and then he quickly threw the ball to the halfway line into the feet of Thomas Müller, who immediately provided the assist for Mario Gómez's opening goal. Neuer then set up the second goal; under pressure by Turkish attackers, he fired a precise long range kick to Mario Götze deep in the opponent's half, who then found Müller on the edge of the opponent's penalty box to score.

Neuer started all five of Germany's matches at UEFA Euro 2012 and kept a clean sheet against Portugal in their opening Group B match.

=== 2014 FIFA World Cup ===
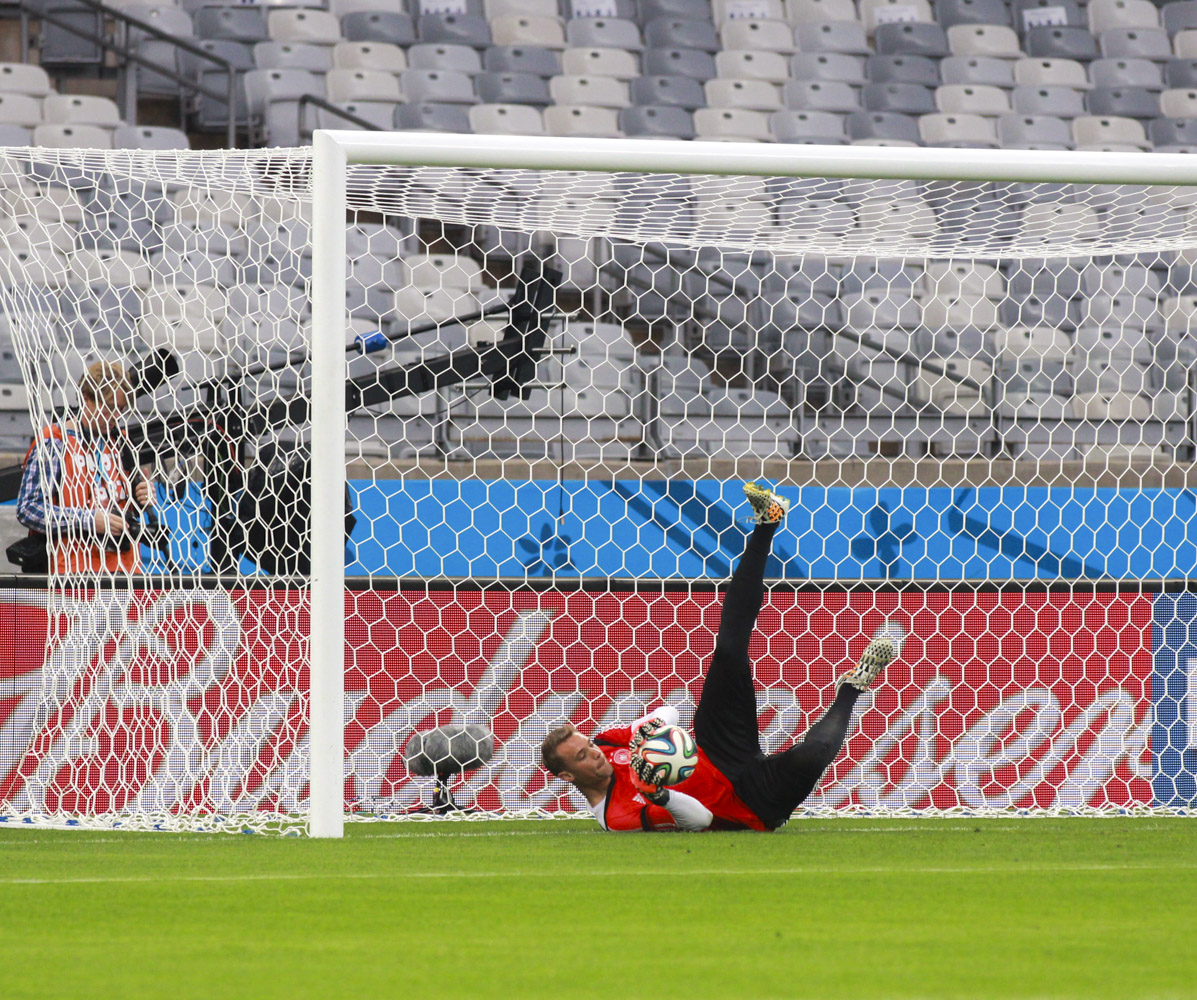
Neuer training before the match against Brazil at the 2014 FIFA World Cup on 7 July

Neuer started in all seven of Germany's matches in their 2014 FIFA World Cup winning campaign, winning the Golden Glove for keeping the most clean sheets at the tournament.

After keeping clean sheets in group matches against Portugal and the United States, Neuer had an outstanding performance in a 2–1 win against Algeria after extra time in the round of 16, when he had to play as a sweeper-keeper to defend their counter-attacks. He recorded his third clean sheet of the World Cup in the 1–0 quarter-final defeat of France. This was his 22nd clean sheet overall in his 50th appearance for die Nationalmannschaft. In the semi-finals, Neuer conceded a late goal as his team routed hosts Brazil 7–1.

On 13 July, in the FIFA World Cup Final against Argentina, Neuer was not heavily tested, but he nonetheless commanded his penalty area well, challenging attacking runs by Gonzalo Higuaín and Rodrigo Palacio that caused them to shoot wide of the net. Early in the second half, Neuer punched the ball clear before colliding with Higuaín at the edge of the box. Argentina finished the match without a shot on goal, despite several good chances, including a Higuaín goal disallowed for offside. Germany ultimately defeated Argentina 1–0 thanks to a Mario Götze goal in extra time. Neuer won the Golden Glove award for the tournament's best goalkeeper. Neuer also finished the tournament with 244 completed passes, more than outfield players like Lionel Messi (242), Wesley Sneijder (242), and Thomas Müller (221).

Neuer's playing style was credited with allowing his teammates to press deep in their opponents' half; Neuer's willingness to come out and challenge opposing attackers caused them to miss shots.

=== UEFA Euro 2016 ===
On 31 May 2016, Neuer was selected for Germany's final 23-man squad for UEFA Euro 2016. He did not concede any goals during Germany's three group games against Ukraine, Poland and Northern Ireland and also kept a clean sheet in the round of 16 against Slovakia. On 2 July 2016, in the quarter-final match against Italy, Neuer broke compatriot Sepp Maier's record of not conceding a goal at a major tournament for 481 minutes. This run ended after 557 minutes, when Leonardo Bonucci scored past him with a penalty kick; A 1–1 draw after extra-time saw the match go to a penalty shoot-out, in which Neuer helped Germany to a 6–5 victory by saving two spot kicks, including one from Bonucci. Neuer was named Man of the Match for his performance.

During this time, Neuer was a part of a collaboration between the German Football Association and The LEGO Group, who in May 2016 released a Europe-exclusive collectible minifigure series, with Neuer featured as the second of sixteen minifigures in the collection.

=== 2018 FIFA World Cup ===
Prior to the start of qualification, on 1 September 2016, Neuer was named new captain of the national team, following Bastian Schweinsteiger's retirement from international football.

After starting the team's first three 2018 FIFA World Cup qualification matches, Neuer missed the rest of Germany's qualifying campaign and the 2017 FIFA Confederations Cup due to injury and illness.

On 15 May 2018, Neuer was selected in Germany's 27-man preliminary squad for the 2018 FIFA World Cup even though he had not played a match since fracturing his foot for a second time in September 2017. Neuer made his first appearance since his injury on 2 June, in a 2–1 friendly defeat to Austria in Klagenfurt. On 4 June, Neuer was selected in the final 23-man squad for the World Cup. On 17 June, Neuer captained his side for the first time in the World Cup in their opening match in which they lost 1–0 to Mexico. On 23 June, Neuer made several saves as his side defeated Sweden with a 2–1 victory in their second group stage match, which kept the Germans from being knocked out of the World Cup. However, in their final Group F match, Germany were knocked out of the tournament as they lost 2–0 to South Korea, with Neuer losing the ball to Ju Se-jong in the opposition half, leading to Son Heung-min's second goal in the 96th minute.

=== UEFA Euro 2020 ===
On 11 June 2019, in Germany's UEFA Euro 2020 qualifying 8–0 victory over Estonia, Neuer kept the 37th clean sheet of his international career, breaking a record set by Sepp Maier. In a 3–1 win over Ukraine on 14 November 2020, Neuer equalled Maier's record of 95 caps for Germany and, three days later, became the nation's all-time most capped goalkeeper with his 96th appearance, a 6–0 loss to Spain in the 2020–21 UEFA Nations League. This was Germany's worst ever defeat in a competitive match and the first time in his professional career that Neuer had conceded six goals in a match. Neuer was selected for the German squad for UEFA Euro 2020. In a pre-tournament friendly against Latvia on 7 June 2021, he achieved his 100th cap with the national team, becoming the first German goalkeeper to reach that milestone. At the Euro 2020 finals, Neuer started all three of Germany's group matches, as well as their round of 16 loss to England at Wembley. UEFA began investigating Neuer for wearing rainbow-coloured captain's armband at the tournament to commemorate Pride month. They later confirmed it did not breach tournament rules against making on-field political statements.

=== 2022 FIFA World Cup ===
Neuer was called up to Germany's squad for the 2022 FIFA World Cup in Qatar, becoming the first German goalkeeper to feature in four consecutive World Cups. On 1 December, he made his 19th World Cup appearance, breaking the previous record for goalkeepers, including both Sepp Maier and Brazil's Cláudio Taffarel of 18 appearances. Despite a 4–2 win over Costa Rica in the last group stage match, Germany failed to progress from the group stage for a second consecutive World Cup as they finished third on goal difference after Japan pulled an upset 2–1 win over Spain. However, he was surpassed by Hugo Lloris who reached 20 appearances during the same tournament.

=== UEFA Euro 2024 ===
On 9 December 2022, eight days after Germany were eliminated from the World Cup, Neuer sustained a broken leg in a skiing accident. During his 18-month absence from the German national team, Neuer was replaced as captain by İlkay Gündoğan, who was retained in the role after the goalkeeper's return to fitness. In June 2024, Neuer was named in Germany's squad for UEFA Euro 2024. He made his first appearance for the national team since the 2022 World Cup in a pre-tournament friendly against Ukraine in Nuremberg, keeping a clean sheet in an 0–0 draw on 3 June.

On 14 June, Neuer started in the opening game of Euro 2024 as the hosts beat Scotland 5–1 in Munich. He played in all five of Germany's matches at the tournament, keeping clean sheets against Hungary in the group stage and Denmark in the round of 16 as the team reached the quarter-final, where they lost 2–1 to Spain. The defeat against Spain, which was his 124th and final cap, was his 39th appearance in an international tournament, allowing him to surpass former teammate Bastian Schweinsteiger as the record appearance making German player in international tournaments. His 20 games at European Championships are also a record amongst German players.

Following the conclusion of the tournament, Neuer announced his retirement from the national team on 21 August 2024. He recorded 51 clean sheets in 124 international appearances.

=== 2026 FIFA World Cup ===
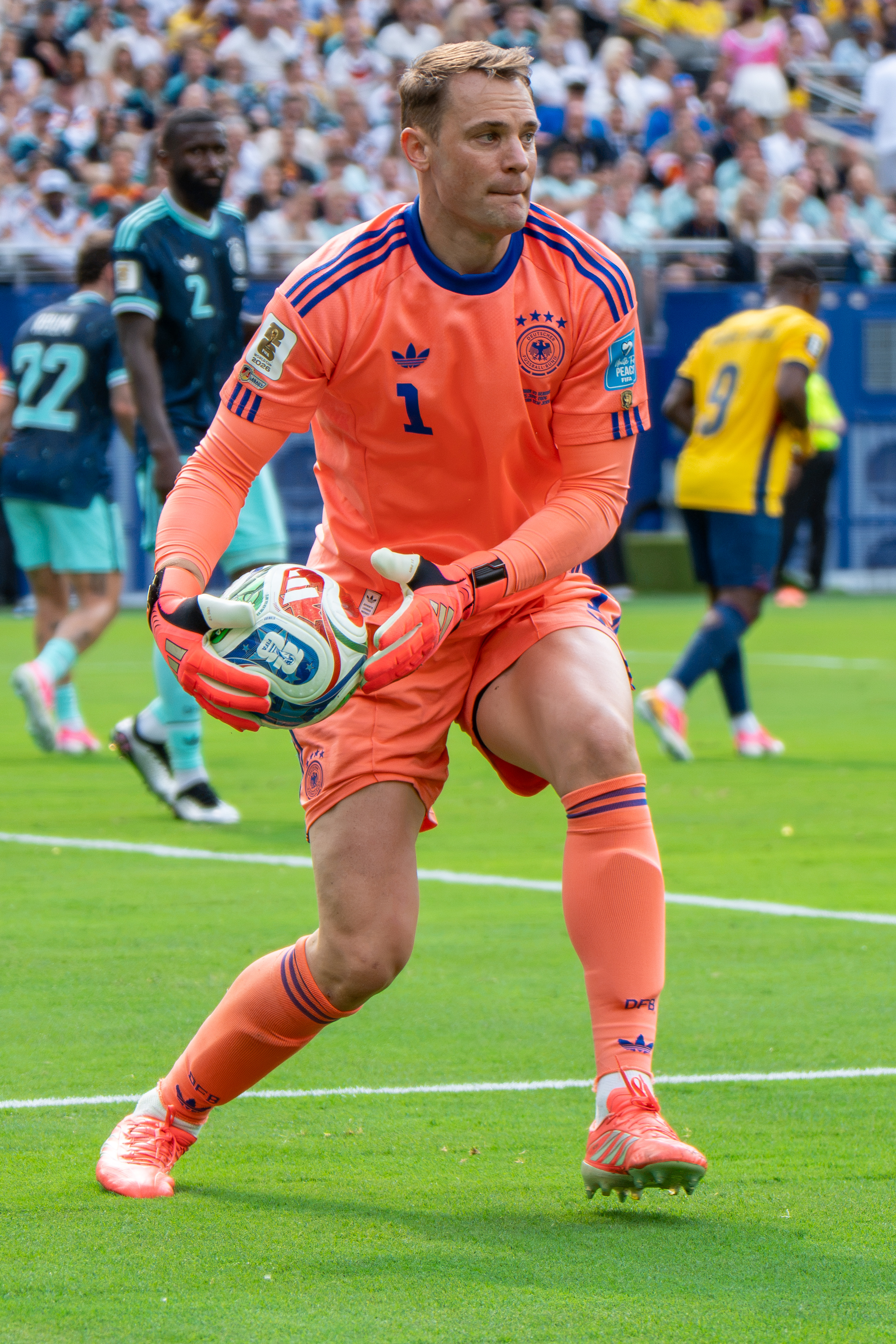
Neuer during Ecuador v Germany at the 2026 FIFA World Cup

On 21 May 2026, Neuer came out of international retirement and was selected in Germany’s 26-man squad for the 2026 FIFA World Cup. On 14 June, he became the oldest Germany player to feature at a major tournament, breaking the record previously held by Lothar Matthäus at 40 years and 79 days beating Curaçao in their opening match with 7–1, marking his first match for Germany in two years. He also tied with Hugo Lloris as the goalkeeper with the most appearances in the tournament with 20, breaking the record six days later in a 2–1 win against Ivory Coast. In the Round of 32 against Paraguay, he saved the fifth penalty in the shootout, but Germany ultimately lost 4–3 on sudden death following a 1–1 draw after extra time, resulting in their elimination from the World Cup. The match also marked his tenth consecutive World Cup game without keeping a clean sheet, a World Cup record shared with Antonio Carbajal, with his last clean sheet occurring in the 2014 World Cup final victory. He announced his second retirement from international football following the World Cup elimination.

== Style of play ==
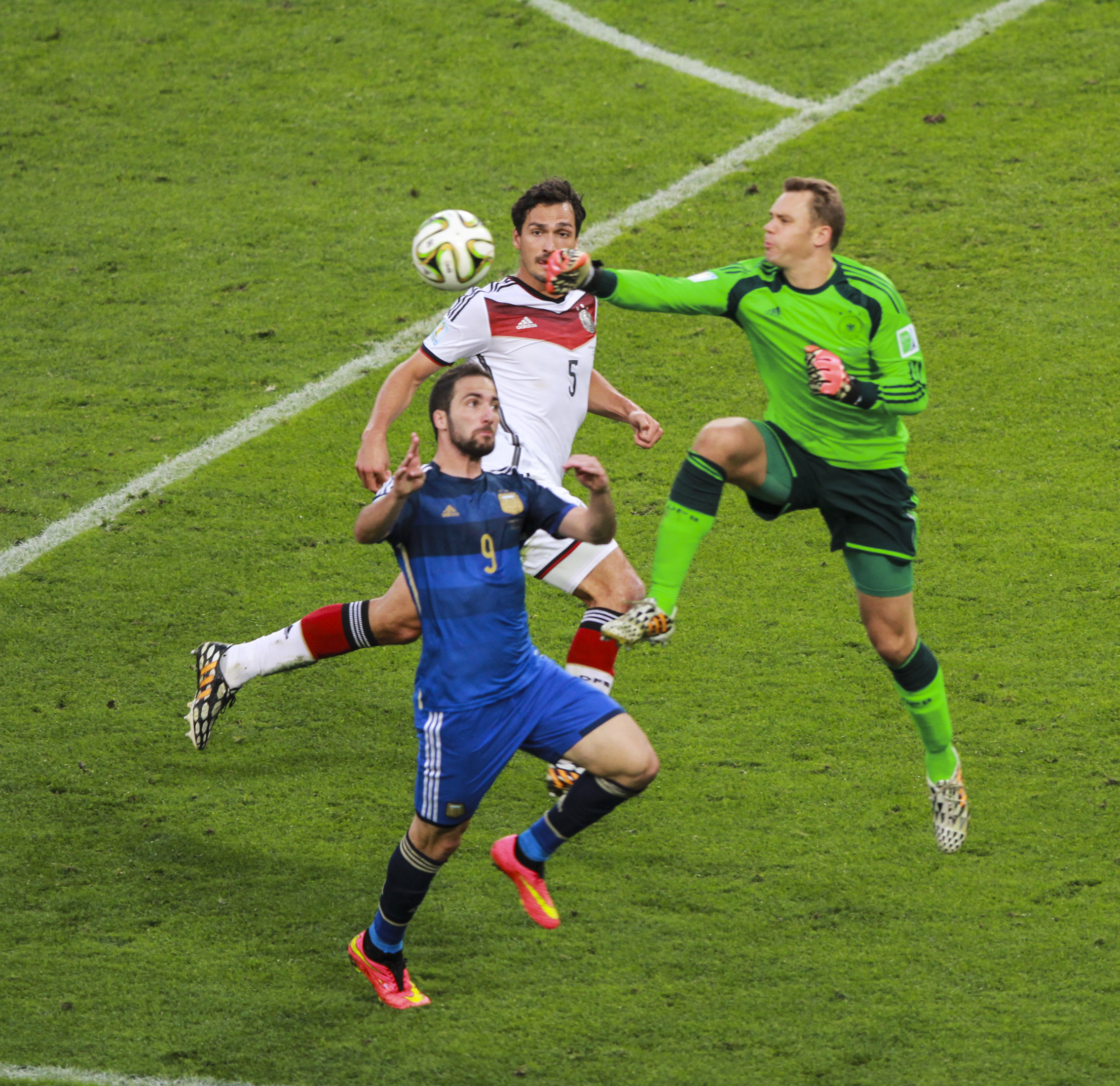
Argentina's Gonzalo Higuaín (in blue) challenging Germany's Mats Hummels (in white) and Neuer during the final of the 2014 FIFA World Cup

Considered by some in the media to be the current best goalkeeper in the world, and one of the greatest goalkeepers both of his generation and of all time, Neuer is widely regarded as a "complete" and modern goalkeeper. He is regarded by some pundits to be the best goalkeeper of the modern era, with Peter Staunton of Goal.com labelling him as "the best goalkeeper since Yashin", who is currently the only goalkeeper ever to have won the Ballon d'Or. (Note: Attributed to multiple references:)

A tall, large, athletic, and physically strong player, Neuer has earned critical acclaim from former players and pundits for his speed, stamina, composure, concentration, consistency, and mentality, as well as for being able to adapt to any given situation on the pitch. He is particularly known for his exceptional reflexes, shot-stopping abilities (with both his arms and legs), agility, speed, and footwork, as well as his handling, capacity to read the game, and ability to come out to collect crosses, which enables him to command his area effectively. When the situation demands, he will also often essentially fill the role of a sweeper when opposing players have beaten the offside trap or his team's defensive line by quickly rushing out of goal to anticipate opponents and clear the ball; his skill, speed and decision-making in this area enables his teams to maintain a high defensive line. Because of his unique playing style, Neuer has been described as a "sweeper-keeper", and has been credited with revolutionizing the role of the goalkeeper in modern times. Pundits have also praised him for his positioning between the posts, as well as his ability in one-on-one situations; furthermore, he is effective at stopping penalties and has also been known to take and score them in shoot-outs.

A former outfield player in his youth, in addition to his goalkeeping ability, Neuer has also been praised for his excellent ball control and for his accurate distribution of the ball with both his hands and feet; his long throwing range and ability to kick the ball into deep areas with either foot enables him to play the ball out on the ground or create plays or launch swift counter-attacks from the back. Regarding his technical skills on the ball in comparison to other players in his role, Neuer has stated that he could play in the German third division as a center-back if so desired. Due to his authoritative leadership and vocal presence in goal, he also excels at communicating with his defenders and organising his team's defensive line. In 2015, Gianluigi Buffon described Neuer as the best goalkeeper of his era in the air.

Despite the praise for his style of play and role in the development of the goalkeeper position in football, Neuer has also received criticism in the German media for his reflex-like objection to attacking moves in his box regardless of whether they violate rules or not. In particular, his tendency to instantaneously raise his arm to alert the referee has led to the creation of the German word Reklamierarm (roughly translated: arm of objection) in German media.

== Personal life ==
Neuer was born in Gelsenkirchen, North Rhine-Westphalia, and attended Gesamtschule Berger Feld. His brother Marcel is currently a football referee in the Verbandsliga. He received his first football when he was two, and he had his first game on 3 March 1991, 24 days before his fifth birthday. Neuer's hero and idol as a child was fellow German and former Schalke goalkeeper Jens Lehmann.

Neuer is Catholic, and lends his support to a Gelsenkirchen-based Catholic social action group which campaigns against child poverty and to a Gelsenkirchen-based youth club run by the Amigonians.

Neuer started a charity foundation for children, named the Manuel Neuer Kids Foundation. In November 2011, he won €500,000 for charity in a celebrity edition of Wer wird Millionär?, the German version of Who Wants to Be a Millionaire?

Neuer said in 2011 that "it would be good if a professional football player came out because it would help others to do the same". Mexico were fined for their fans' homophobic chants when Neuer had the ball during a World Cup match in 2018.

In November 2022, Neuer revealed that he had to undergo three surgeries on his face in order to treat skin cancer, which later urged him to work with Angelique Kerber to promote sun cream.

=== Relationships ===
Neuer was in a relationship with Kathrin Gilch until 2014. In 2015, Neuer started a relationship with Nina Weiss. On 21 May 2017, Neuer and Weiss married in Tannheim, Austria, in a civil ceremony, which was followed by a church wedding in the Cathedral of Santissima della Madia in Monopoli, Italy, on 10 June. The couple separated in early 2020, and Neuer started dating handball player Anika Bissel. In October 2023, reports stated that she would miss the rest of the season with ESV 1927 Regensburg due to pregnancy. On 14 March 2024, their son, Luca, was born. On 19 July 2025, the couple exchanged wedding vows in a ceremony held in Bolzano, South Tyrol, following their civil wedding in 2023.

== Career statistics ==
=== Club ===
As of match played 7 November 2026

Appearances and goals by club, season and competition
Club	Season	League			DFB-Pokal		Europe		Other		Total	
Club	Season	Division	Apps	Goals	Apps	Goals	Apps	Goals	Apps	Goals	Apps	Goals
Schalke 04 II	2003–04	Regionalliga Nord	1	0	—		—		—		1	0
Schalke 04 II	2004–05	Oberliga Westfalen	1	0	—		—		—		1	0
Schalke 04 II	2005–06	Oberliga Westfalen	20	0	—		—		—		20	0
Schalke 04 II	2006–07	Oberliga Westfalen	3	0	—		—		—		3	0
Schalke 04 II	2008–09	Regionalliga West	1	0	—		—		—		1	0
Schalke 04 II	Total		26	0	—		—		—		26	0
Schalke 04	2005–06	Bundesliga	0	0	0	0	0	0	0	0	0	0
Schalke 04	2006–07	Bundesliga	27	0	0	0	0	0	3 (Note: Appearances in DFL-Ligapokal)	0	30	0
Schalke 04	2007–08	Bundesliga	34	0	3	0	10 (Note: Appearance(s) in UEFA Champions League)	0	—		47	0
Schalke 04	2008–09	Bundesliga	27	0	2	0	5 (Note: Appearances in UEFA Cup)	0	—		34	0
Schalke 04	2009–10	Bundesliga	34	0	5	0	—		—		39	0
Schalke 04	2010–11	Bundesliga	34	0	6	0	12	0	1 (Note: Appearance in DFL-/Franz Beckenbauer Supercup)	0	53	0
Schalke 04	Total		156	0	16	0	27	0	4	0	203	0
Bayern Munich	2011–12	Bundesliga	33	0	5	0	14	0	—		52	0
Bayern Munich	2012–13	Bundesliga	31	0	5	0	13	0	1	0	50	0
Bayern Munich	2013–14	Bundesliga	31	0	5	0	12	0	3 (Note: One appearance in UEFA Super Cup, two appearances in FIFA Club World Cup)	0	51	0
Bayern Munich	2014–15	Bundesliga	32	0	5	0	12	0	1	0	50	0
Bayern Munich	2015–16	Bundesliga	34	0	5	0	11	0	1	0	51	0
Bayern Munich	2016–17	Bundesliga	26	0	4	0	9	0	1	0	40	0
Bayern Munich	2017–18	Bundesliga	3	0	0	0	1	0	0	0	4	0
Bayern Munich	2018–19	Bundesliga	26	0	3	0	8	0	1	0	38	0
Bayern Munich	2019–20	Bundesliga	33	0	6	0	11	0	1	0	51	0
Bayern Munich	2020–21	Bundesliga	33	0	1	0	8	0	4 (Note: One appearance in UEFA Super Cup, one appearance in DFL-Supercup, two appearances in FIFA Club World Cup)	0	46	0
Bayern Munich	2021–22	Bundesliga	28	0	1	0	9	0	1	0	39	0
Bayern Munich	2022–23	Bundesliga	12	0	0	0	3	0	1	0	16	0
Bayern Munich	2023–24	Bundesliga	23	0	1	0	9	0	0	0	33	0
Bayern Munich	2024–25	Bundesliga	22	0	3	0	10	0	5 (Note: Appearances in FIFA Club World Cup)	0	40	0
Bayern Munich	2025–26	Bundesliga	22	0	3	0	11	0	1	0	37	0
Bayern Munich	2026–27	Bundesliga	5	0	0	0	3	0	1	0	9	0
Bayern Munich	Total		394	0	47	0	144	0	22	0	607	0
Career total			576	0	63	0	171	0	26	0	836	0

=== International ===
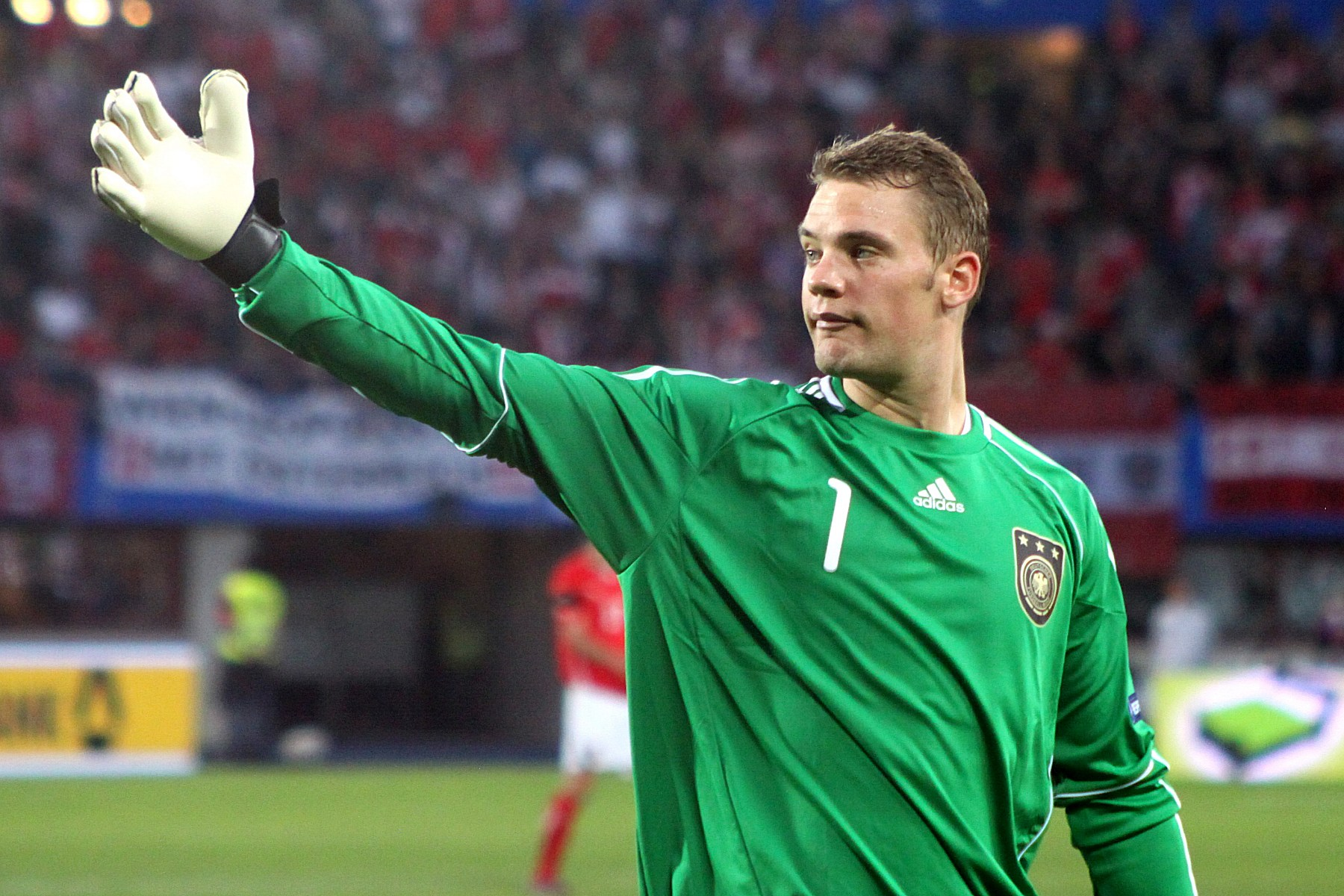
Neuer playing for Germany in 2011

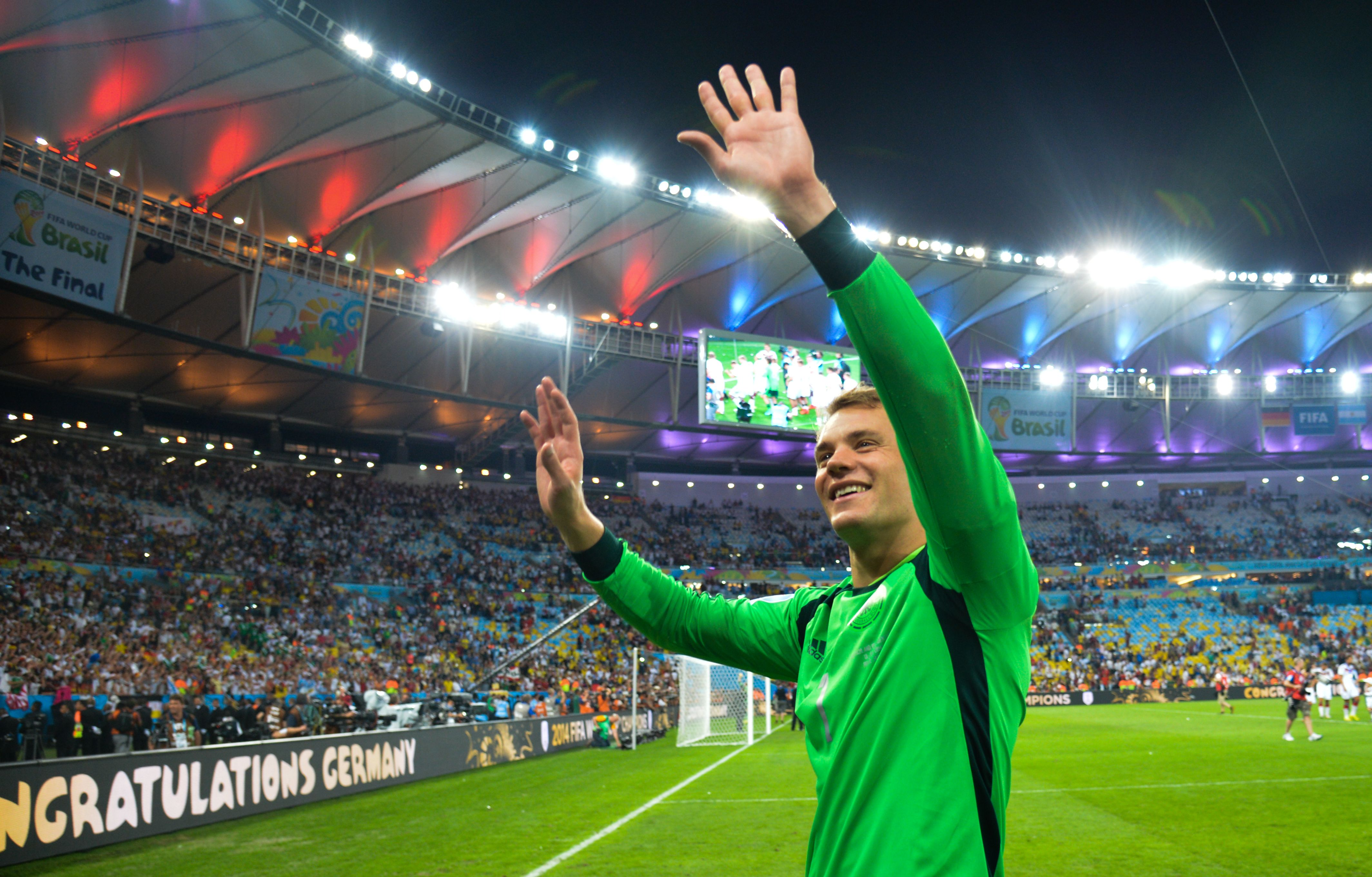
Neuer celebrating after Germany's 1–0 victory over Argentina in the FIFA World Cup final

Appearances and goals by national team and year
National team	Year	Apps	Goals
Germany
Germany	2009	2	0
Germany	2010	13	0
Germany	2011	10	0
Germany	2012	11	0
Germany	2013	8	0
Germany	2014	13	0
Germany	2015	6	0
Germany	2016	11	0
Germany	2017	0	0
Germany	2018	10	0
Germany	2019	8	0
Germany	2020	4	0
Germany	2021	12	0
Germany	2022	9	0
Germany	2023	0	0
Germany	2024	7	0
Germany	2025	0	0
Germany	2026	4	0
Total		128	0

== Honours ==
Schalke 04

- DFB-Pokal: 2010–11
- DFL-Ligapokal: 2005

Bayern Munich

- Bundesliga: 2012–13, 2013–14, 2014–15, 2015–16, 2016–17, 2017–18, 2018–19, 2019–20, 2020–21, 2021–22, 2022–23, 2024–25, 2025–26
- DFB-Pokal: 2012–13, 2013–14, 2015–16, 2018–19, 2019–20, 2025–26
- DFL-/Franz Beckenbauer Supercup: 2012, 2016, 2018, 2020, 2021, 2022, 2025, 2026
- UEFA Champions League: 2012–13, 2019–20
- UEFA Super Cup: 2013, 2020
- FIFA Club World Cup: 2013, 2020

Germany U21

- UEFA European Under-21 Championship: 2009

Germany

- FIFA World Cup: 2014; third place: 2010
- UEFA European Championship third place: 2012

Individual

- Fritz Walter Medal U19 Silver: 2005
- kicker Goalkeeper of the Year: 2006–2007, 2010–11, 2013–14, 2014–15, 2015–16, 2016–17, 2019–20, 2020–21, 2021–22
- Footballer of the Year in Germany: 2011, 2014
- Germany national team Player of the Year: 2020
- ESM Team of the Season: 2011–12, 2012–13, 2014–15
- UEFA European Championship Team of the Tournament: 2012
- UEFA European Under-21 Championship All-time Dream Team
- IFFHS World's Best Goalkeeper: 2013, 2014, 2015, 2016, 2020
- IFFHS World's Best Goalkeeper of the Decade: 2011–2020
- Best European Goalkeeper: 2011, 2013, 2014, 2015, 2020
- IFFHS Men's World Team: 2020
- FIFPRO World 11: 2013, 2014 2015, 2016
- UEFA Team of the Year: 2013, 2014, 2015, 2020
- UEFA Champions League Final Fan's Man of the Match: 2013
- UEFA Champions League Squad of the Season: 2013–14, 2015–16, 2019–20
- UEFA Champions League Goalkeeper of the Season: 2019–20
- The Best FIFA Men's Goalkeeper: 2020
- FIFA World Cup All-Star Team: 2010
- FIFA World Cup Golden Glove: 2014
- FIFA World Cup All-Star Team: 2014
- FIFA World Cup Dream Team: 2014
- FIFA Ballon d'Or third place: 2014
- AIPS Athlete of the Year: 2014
- AIPS Europe Athlete of the Year – Frank Taylor Trophy: 2014
- Bundesliga Team of the Season: 2012–13, 2013–14, 2014–15, 2015–16, 2016–17, 2020–21, 2021–22
- kicker Bundesliga Team of the Season: 2010–11, 2019–20, 2020–21
- VDV Bundesliga Team of the Season: 2009–10, 2010–11, 2012–13, 2013–14, 2014–15, 2015–16, 2016–17, 2019–20, 2020–21, 2025–26
- Ballon d'Or Dream Team (Silver): 2020
- IFFHS World Team of the Decade: 2011–2020
- IFFHS UEFA Team of the Decade: 2011–2020

Orders

- Silbernes Lorbeerblatt: 2010, 2014
- Order of Merit of North Rhine-Westphalia: 2019
- Bavarian Order of Merit: 2021

== Other media ==
In July 2012, Adidas and 505 Games announced the release of the training video game Adidas miCoach for consoles, featuring Manuel Neuer alongside Kaká and Ana Ivanovic. Using PlayStation Move and the Xbox 360 Kinect sensor, players could train with the athletes through more than 400 exercises, and each athlete presented a class specific to their sport. In 2013, Neuer made his film voiceover debut.

== See also ==
- List of footballers with 100 or more UEFA Champions League appearances
- List of men's footballers with 100 or more international caps
