= Dominique Wassi =

Cameroonian footballer

Personal information
- Date of birth: 8 August 1989 (age 37)
- Place of birth: Douala, Cameroon
- Height: 1.77 m (5 ft 10 in)
- Position: Forward

Youth career
- USL Dunkerque
- 2006–2008: Schalke 04

Senior career*
Years	Team	Apps	(Gls)
2007–2008	Schalke 04 II	5	(0)
2008–2011	Atromitos	33	(4)
2009–2010	→ Egaleo (loan)	17	(2)
2010–2011	→ Ethnikos Asteras (loan)	19	(1)
2011–2012	Hapoel Petah Tikva	46	(8)
2013–2014	Hapoel Ashkelon	14	(1)
- * Club domestic league appearances and goals

Dominique Wassi (born 8 August 1989) is a Cameroonian former professional footballer who played as a forward.

== Career ==
Wassi was born in Douala. In 2006, he joined Schalke 04, from French team USL Dunkerque. In 2007–08 season he played in 25 games and scored 14 goals in the A-Jugend Bundesliga West. In November 2007 was promoted for a short stint to the first team. Then Wassi left in July 2008 Schalke 04 and signed a contract in Greece by Atromitos now played his first professional game in Europe on 14 September 2008 against Veria. After 22 games who scores four goals for his club Atromitos was loaned out in July 2009 to Egaleo.

In November 2011, he signed at Hapoel Petah Tikva from the Israeli Premier League.
