= Mario Klinger =

German footballer

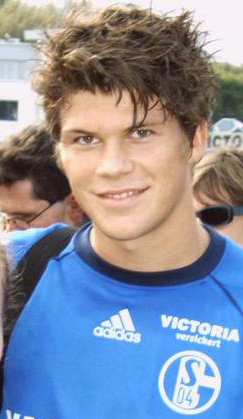

Personal information
- Date of birth: 27 December 1986 (age 39)
- Place of birth: Essen, West Germany
- Height: 1.82 m (6 ft 0 in)
- Position: Midfielder

Team information
- Current team: SG Wattenscheid 09
- Number: 25

Youth career
- 1990–2001: PSV Essen
- 2001–2005: FC Schalke 04

Senior career*
Years	Team	Apps	(Gls)
2005–2006	FC Schalke 04 II	3	(0)
2005–2006	FC Schalke 04	0	(0)
2006–2007	KSV Hessen Kassel	28	(2)
2007–2008	Rot-Weiss Essen	23	(0)
2008–2010	1. FC Kaiserslautern II	36	(12)
2008–2010	1. FC Kaiserslautern	0	(0)
2010–2012	Rot-Weiß Oberhausen	41	(2)
2012–2013	Eintracht Trier	19	(1)
2013–2014	FC Homburg	24	(2)
2014–	SG Wattenscheid 09	22	(3)

International career
2006	Germany U-20	2	(0)
- * Club domestic league appearances and goals as of 1 July 2015

Mario Klinger (born 27 December 1986 in Essen) is a German footballer who plays for SG Wattenscheid 09.
