= David Müller (footballer, born 1984) =

German footballer

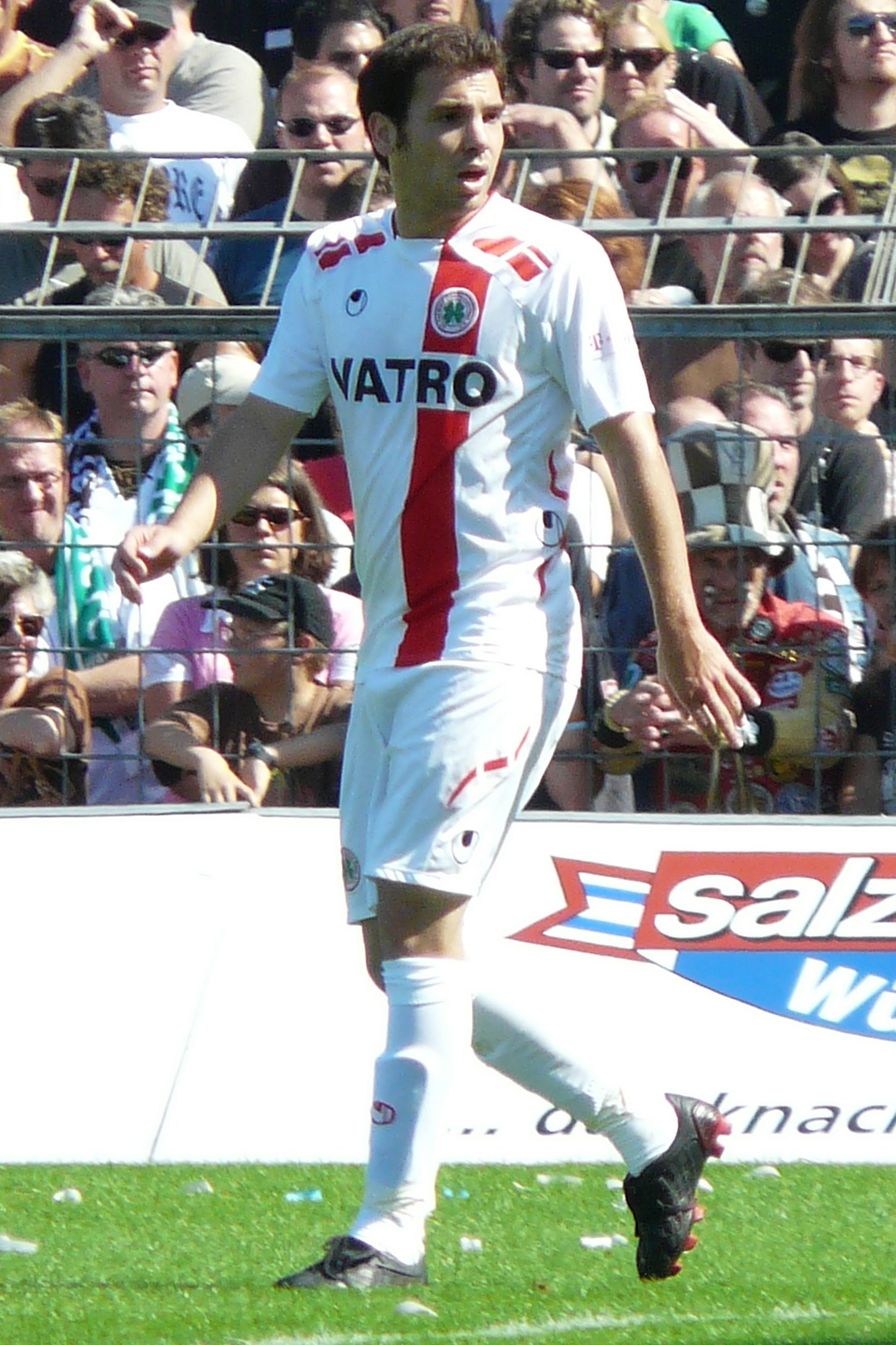

Personal information
- Date of birth: 22 December 1984 (age 41)
- Place of birth: Leverkusen, West Germany
- Height: 1.78 m (5 ft 10 in)
- Position: Left midfielder

Youth career
- TuS Höhenhaus
- –1999: 1. FC Köln

Senior career*
Years	Team	Apps	(Gls)
1999–2005	Bayer 04 Leverkusen II	23	(1)
2005–2006	FC Schalke 04 II	28	(2)
2006–2007	TuRU Düsseldorf	27	(7)
2007–2008	Rot-Weiß Oberhausen	41	(10)
2009	VfR Aalen	11	(0)
2009	Sportfreunde Siegen	8	(1)
2010–2011	TSV Germania Windeck	33	(10)
2011–2014	FC Viktoria Köln 1904	75	(25)
2014–2017	SSVg Velbert	76	(16)
2017–2018	TVD Velbert	3	(1)
Total		325	(73)
- * Club domestic league appearances and goals

David Müller (born 22 December 1984) is a German retired footballer

In August 2009, his transfer to Sportfreunde Siegen was confirmed. In January 2010, Müller joined TSV Germania Windeck. In July 2011, he moved to FC Viktoria Köln 1904. In 2014, he moved to SSVg Velbert.
