= 2008–09 FC Schalke 04 season =

Schalke 04
2008–09 season
- Chairman: Josef Schnusenberg
- Manager: Fred Rutten
- Bundesliga: 8th
- DFB-Pokal: Quarter-finals
- Champions League: Third qualifying round
- UEFA Cup: Group stage
- Top goalscorer: League: Kevin Kurányi (13); All: Kevin Kurányi (16)
Home colours	Away colours	Third colours

The 2008–09 season was Schalke 04's 41st season in the Bundesliga. This article shows player statistics and all matches (official and friendly) that the club played during the 2008–09 season.

Schalke 04 finished eighth in the league table.

== Players ==
=== Squad information ===
N	Pos.	Nat.	Name	Age	Since	App	Goals	Ends	Transfer fee	Notes
1	GK	(Germany)	Manuel Neuer	23	2005	61	0	2012	Youth system	
32	GK	(Germany)	Ralf Fährmann	20	2006	0	0	2009	Youth system	
33	GK	(Germany)	Mathias Schober	33	2007	0	0	2011		
35	GK	(Germany)	Mohamed Amsif (Note: Amsif was born in Düsseldorf, West Germany (now Germany), and represented them at U-18, U-19 and U-20 level, but also qualified to represent Morocco internationally and made his international debut for Morocco in 2011.)	20	2008	0	0	2010	Youth system	
2	DF	(Germany)	Heiko Westermann	25	2007	32	4	2011		
5	DF	(Brazil)	Marcelo Bordon (captain)	33	2004	116	12	2011		
18	DF	(Brazil)	Rafinha	23	2005	92	4	2011		
20	DF	(Serbia)	Mladen Krstajić (Note: Krstajić was born in Zenica, SFR Yugoslavia (now Bosnia and Herzegovina), but was raised in Serbia and Montenegro (now Serbia) and made his international debut for Serbia and Montenegro in 1999.)	35	2004	107	6	2009		
23	DF	(Germany)	Benedikt Höwedes	21	2007	6	0	2010	Youth system	
24	DF	(Germany)	Christian Pander	25	2004	57	4	2011	Youth system	
25	DF	(Peru)	Carlos Zambrano	19	2008	0	0	2012	Youth system	
3	MF	(Georgia (country))	Levan Kobiashvili	31	2003	134	8	2010		
6	MF	(Germany)	Albert Streit (Note: Streit was born in Bucharest, Romania, but also qualified to represent Germany internationally and represented them at U-16, U-17, U-18, and B level.)	29	2008 (Winter)	10	0	2012		
7	MF	(Uruguay)	Gustavo Varela	31	2002	82	8	2009		
8	MF	(Germany)	Fabian Ernst	30	2005	90	1	2010		
10	MF	(Croatia)	Ivan Rakitić (Note: Rakitić was born in Möhlin, Switzerland, and represented them at U-16, U-17, U-19 and U-21 level, but also qualified to represent Croatia through his parents and made his international debut for Croatia in September 2007.)	21	2007	29	3	2011		
13	MF	(Germany)	Jermaine Jones (Note: Jones was born in Frankfurt, West Germany (now Germany), and represented them at U-20, U-21 and B level and made his international debut for Germany in 2008, but also qualified to represent the United States through his father and made his international debut for the United States in October 2010.)	27	2007	30	1	2011		
15	MF	(Brazil)	Zé Roberto	28	2008 (Winter)	3	1	2011		
21	MF	(Uruguay)	Carlos Grossmüller	26	2007	11	1	2011		
28	MF	(Germany)	Markus Heppke	23	2006	1	0	2009	Youth system	
30	MF	(Georgia (country))	Levan Kenia	18	2008	0	0	2012	Youth system	
37	MF	(Netherlands)	Orlando Engelaar	29	2008	0	0	2011		
11	FW	(Denmark)	Peter Løvenkrands	29	2006	44	6	2009		
14	FW	(Germany)	Gerald Asamoah (Note: Asamoah was born in Mampong, Ghana, but was raised in Germany from the age of 12 and made his international debut for Germany in May 2001.)	30	1999	244	41	2011		
17	FW	(Peru)	Jefferson Farfán	24	2008	0	0	2012		
19	FW	(Turkey)	Halil Altıntop (Note: Altıntop was born in Gelsenkirchen, West Germany (now Germany), but also qualified to represent Turkey internationally and represented them at U-18, U-20, U-21 and B level before making his international debut for Turkey in 2005.)	26	2006	58	12	2010		
22	FW	(Germany)	Kevin Kurányi (Note: Kurányi was born in Rio de Janeiro, Brazil, but also qualified to represent Germany internationally through his father and Panama through his mother and represented Germany at U-20, U-21 and B level before making his international debut for Germany in March 2003.)	27	2005	96	40	2010		
27	MF	(Uruguay)	Vicente Sánchez	29	2008 (Winter)	14	1	2011		

- Last updated: 2008-08-16
- Source: Players transfer, Wikipedia players' articles,

Fussballdaten (for appearances and goals)

- Ordered by position on pitch.

== Transfers ==
=== In ===
No.	Pos.	Nat.	Name	Age	EU	Moving from	Type	Transfer window	Ends	Transfer fee	Source
37	MF	(Netherlands)	Engelaar	28	EU	Twente (Netherlands)	Transfer	Summer	2011	€6m	Sports Network
17	FW	(Peru)	Farfán	23	EU	PSV (Netherlands)	Transfer	Summer	2012	€10m	Sports Network
35	GK	(Morocco)	Amsif	19	EU	Youth system	Promotion	Summer	2010	n/a	
30	MF	(Georgia (country))	Kenia	17	EU	Youth system	Promotion	Summer	2012	n/a	
25	DF	(Peru)	Zambrano	18	EU	Youth system	Promotion	Summer	2012	n/a	

=== Out ===
No.	Pos.	Nat.	Name	Age	EU	Moving to	Type	Transfer window	Transfer fee	Source
4	DF	(Germany)	Abel	27	EU	Mainz 05	Transfer	Summer	Undisclosed	[]
26	MF	(Germany)	Azaouagh	25	EU	VfL Bochum	Transfer	Summer	Undisclosed	[]
29	MF	(Bosnia and Herzegovina)	Bajramović	28	EU	Eintracht Frankfurt	Transfer	Summer	Undisclosed	[]
9	FW	(Denmark)	Larsen	26	EU	Toulouse (France)	Transfer	Summer	Undisclosed	[]

Last updated: 2008-08-16

== Squad statistics ==
=== Appearances and goals ===
				Total			Bundesliga		Champions League		DFB Cup	
No.	Pos.	Nat.	Name	Sts	App	Gls	App	Gls	App	Gls	App	Gls
1	GK	(Germany)	Neuer									
32	GK	(Germany)	Fährmann	1	1		1					
33	GK	(Germany)	Schober	6	6		3		2		1	
35	GK	(Morocco)	Amsif									
2	DF	(Germany)	Westermann	7	7	3	4	3	2		1	
5	CB	(Brazil)	Bordon	7	7	1	4	1	2		1	
18	RB	(Brazil)	Rafinha	2	3	1	2	1	1			
20	CB	(Serbia)	Krstajić	2	3		2		1			
23	CB	(Germany)	Höwedes	5	7		4		2		1	
24	LB	(Germany)	Pander	7	7	1	4		2	1	1	
25	DF	(Peru)	Zambrano									
3	MF	(Georgia (country))	Kobiashvili	3	5		3		1		1	
6	RM	(Germany)	Streit									
7	RW	(Uruguay)	Varela									
8	DM	(Germany)	Ernst	7	7		4		2		1	
10	AM	(Croatia)	Rakitić	6	6		3		2		1	
13	DM	(Germany)	Jones	6	6		3		2		1	
15	AM	(Brazil)	Zé Roberto									
21	MF	(Uruguay)	Grossmüller	1	2		2					
28	MF	(Germany)	Heppke									
30	CM	(Georgia (country))	Kenia									
37	CM	(Netherlands)	Engelaar	2	2				1		1	
11	FW	(Denmark)	Løvenkrands									
14	RW	(Germany)	Asamoah	2	7		4		2		1	
17	FW	(Peru)	Farfán	3	3	2	1	1	1		1	1
19	FW	(Turkey)	Altıntop	3	6	1	3		2		1	1
22	FW	(Germany)	Kurányi	7	7	3	4	2	2		1	1
27	LW	(Uruguay)	Sánchez		3		3					

Last updated: 2008-09-16
Source: Match reports in competitive matches and Fussballdaten.de
Ordered by start team, game starts and position on pitch (from back right to front left)
0 shown as blank

=== Disciplinary record ===
N	Pos.	Nat.	Name	Yellow card	Second yellow card	Red card	Notes
24	LB	(Germany)	Pander		1	1	
8	DM	(Germany)	Ernst	3	0	1	
13	DM	(Germany)	Jones	2	0	0	
22	FW	(Germany)	Kurányi	1	0	0	
17	FW	(Peru)	Farfán	1	0	0	
10	AM	(Croatia)	Rakitić	1	0	0	
19	FW	(Turkey)	Altıntop	1	0	0	
18	FW	(Brazil)	Rafinha	1	0	0	

Last updated: 16 September 2008
Source: Competitive matches at Fussballdaten.de
Only competitive matches
(yellow card) = Number of bookings; (second yellow card) = Number of sending offs after a second yellow card; (red card) = Number of sending offs by a direct red card.

== Club ==
=== Coaching staff ===
Position	Staff
Head coach	(Netherlands) Fred Rutten
Assistant coach	(Germany) Mike Büskens
Assistant coach	(Germany) Youri Mulder
Fitness coach	(Germany) Rouven Schirp
Goalkeeper coach	(Germany) Oliver Reck

Source: Wiki.de

=== Other information ===
Chairman	(Germany) Josef Schnusenberg
General Secretary	(Germany) Peter Peters
General manager	(Germany) Andreas Müller
Ground (capacity and dimensions)	Veltins-Arena (61,482 / 105x68m)
Club Value	€348 m

Source: Managing Board (Schalke04), Veltins-Arena, Forbes

=== Kits ===
Home	Home Alternate	Away	Third	Fourth

Type	Shirt	Shorts	Socks	First appearance / Info
Home	Blue	Blue	Blue	
Home Alt.	Blue	Blue	White	Bundesliga, Match 8, 19 October against Hamburg
Away	White	White	White	
Third	Navy	Navy	Navy	→ European Kit
Fourth	Orange	Black	Orange	Bundesliga, Match 33, 16 May against Berlin → 2006–07 Third Kit

== Competitions ==
=== Overall ===
As in the last two seasons, Schalke 04 was present in all major competitions, including the First division and the DFB Cup in Germany but they failed to qualify for the UEFA Champions League in Europe.

As of 27 August

Competition	Started round	Current position / round	Final position / round	First match	Last match
Bundesliga	—	—		2008-08-16	2009-05-23
Champions League	Third qualifying round	Third qualifying round	Third qualifying round	2008-08-13	2008-08-27
UEFA Cup	First round	First round		2008-09-16	
DFB Cup	Round of 64	Round of 32		2008-08-09	

Updated to match played 15 September
Source: Competitions

=== Bundesliga ===
==== Standings ====
Pos	Team	Pld	W	D	L	GF	GA	GD	Pts	Qualification or relegation
6	Borussia Dortmund	34	15	14	5	60	37	+23	59	
7	1899 Hoffenheim	34	15	10	9	63	49	+14	55	
8	Schalke 04	34	14	8	12	47	35	+12	50	
9	Bayer Leverkusen	34	14	7	13	59	46	+13	49	
10	Werder Bremen (Note: Werder Bremen qualified for the play-off round of the UEFA Europa League by winning the 2008–09 DFB-Pokal.)	34	12	9	13	64	50	+14	45	Qualification to Europa League play-off round

Source: kicker (in German)
Rules for classification: 1) points; 2) goal difference; 3) number of goals scored.

==== Results summary ====
Overall								Home						Away					
Pld	W	D	L	GF	GA	GD	Pts	W	D	L	GF	GA	GD	W	D	L	GF	GA	GD
27	14	7	6	47	31	+16	49	9	3	1	43	27	+16	5	4	5	4	4	0

Source: Fussballdaten

==== Results by round ====
Round	1	2	3	4	5	6	7	8	9	10	11	12	13	14	15	16	17	18	19	20	21	22	23	24	25	26	27	28	29	30	31	32	33	34
Ground	H	A	H	A	H	A	H	A	H	A	A	H	A	H	A	H	A	A	H	A	H	A	H	A	H	A	H	H	A	H	A	H	A	H
Result	W	D	W	D	W	L	D	D	D	W	W	L	L	W	L	W	D	L	W	L	D	W	W	L	L	W	W	W	W	L	L	L	D	L

Updated to match(es) played on 2008-09-15. Source: Competitive Matches
A = Away; H = Home; W = Win; D = Draw; L = Loss

== Matches ==
=== Competitive ===
Game	Date	Tournament	Round	Ground	Opponent	Score^{1}	Report
1	2008-08-09	DFB Cup	Round 1	A	Hamburger SV	3–0	Report / Report link; Kick off / 19:30 CET; Attendance / 18,800; Referee / Michael Kempter (Germany); Hamburger SV / Schalke 04; (yellow card) Muftawu / 45' Farfán; 55' Altıntop; 67', (yellow card) Kurányi
2	2008-08-13	Champions League	Qual. 1st Leg	H	Atlético Madrid (Spain)	1–0	Report / Report link; Kick off / 20:45 CET; Attendance / 54,142; Referee / Peter Fröjdfeldt (Sweden); Schalke 04 / Atlético Madrid; (yellow card) 10' Ernst; 30' Pander; (yellow card) 42' Farfán; (yellow card) 89' Jones / (yellow card) 19' R. García; (yellow card) 29' (yellow-red card) 76' López; (yellow card) 35' Heitinga; (yellow card) 82' Rodríguez; (yellow card) 88' Pernía; (yellow card) 90+1' L. García
3	2008-08-16	Bundesliga	1	H	Hannover 96	3–0	Report / Report link; Kick off / 15:30 CET; Attendance / 61,673; Referee / Günter Perl (Germany); Schalke 04 / Hannover 96; 2' Bordon; 7' 64' Kurányi; (yellow card) 43' Rakitić / (yellow card) 27' Balitsch; (yellow card) 43' Lala
4	2008-08-23	Bundesliga	2	A	Werder Bremen	1–1	Report / Report link; Kick off / 15:30 CET; Attendance / 42,100; Referee / Dr. Helmut Fleischer (Germany); Werder Bremen / Schalke 04; 64' Frings / (yellow card) 32' Ernst; 85' Westermann
5	2008-08-27	Champions League	Qual. 2nd Leg	A (Spain)	Atlético Madrid (Spain)	0–4	Report / Report link; Kick off / 20:45 CET; Attendance / 55,000; Referee / Frank De Bleeckere (Belgium); Atlético Madrid / Schalke 04; 22' Agüero; (yellow card) 52' Pernía; 54' Forlán; (yellow card) 54' Forlán; (yellow card) 65' Rodríguez; 82' L. García; 86' Rodríguez / (yellow card) 34' Ernst; (yellow card) 45+3' Jones; (yellow card) 55' Altıntop; (red card) 86' Pander; (yellow card) 90' Rafinha
6	2008-08-30	Bundesliga	3	H	VfL Bochum	1–0	Kick off / 15:30 CET; Attendance / 61,673; Referee / Wolfgang Stark (Germany); Schalke 04 / VfL Bochum; 36' Westermann / (yellow card) 63' Šesták; (yellow card) 77' (yellow-red card) 90' Fuchs
7	2008-09-13	Bundesliga	4	A	Borussia Dortmund	3–3	Kick off / 15:30 CET; Attendance / 80,600; Referee / Lutz Wagner (Germany); Borussia Dortmund / Schalke 04; (yellow card) 16' Hajnal; (yellow card) 19' Subotić; 67' Subotić; 70' 89' Frei; (yellow card) 85' Hummels / 20' Farfán; (yellow card) 27' Rafinha; 39' Rafinha; 54' Westermann; (yellow card) 69' (yellow-red card) 73' Pander; (red card) 76' Ernst
8	2008-09-20	Bundesliga	5	H	Eintracht Frankfurt	1–0	Kick off / --:-- CET; Attendance / 61,542; Referee / Herbert Fandel (Germany); Schalke 04 / Eintracht Frankfurt; 41' (o.g.) Ochs / (yellow card) 13' Galindo; (yellow card) 17' Spycher; (red card) 34' Chris; (yellow card) 79' Fenin
9	2008-09-27	Bundesliga	6	A	1. FC Köln	1–0	Kick off / --:-- CET; Attendance / 50,000; Referee / Meyer; 1. FC Köln / Schalke 04; (yellow card) 30' Ehmet; 43' Mohamad; (yellow card) 80' Geromel / (yellow card) 29' Rafinha; (yellow card) 63' Sánchez; (yellow card) 76' Fárfan
10	2008-10-04	Bundesliga	7	H	VfL Wolfsburg	2–2	Kick off / --:-- CET; Attendance / 60,549; Referee / Gräfe; Schalke 04 / VfL Wolfsburg; 20', 90+3', (yellow card) 75' Kurányi; (yellow card) 53' Bordon; (yellow card) 62' Jones; (yellow card) 73' Krstajić / 51' Džeko; (yellow card) 59' Riether; (yellow card) 60' Misimović; 66' Caiuby; (red card) 71' Costa
11	2008-10-18	Bundesliga	8	A	Hamburger SV	1–1	Kick off / --:-- CET; Attendance / 57,000; Referee / Babak Rafati (Iran) (Germany); Hamburger SV / Schalke 04; 29' Trochowski; (yellow card) 59' Jarolím; (yellow card) 63' Atouba; (yellow card) 65' Benjamin / 48' Höwedes; (yellow card) 58' Bordon; (yellow card) 90' Rafinha
12	2008-10-25	Bundesliga	9	H	Arminia Bielefeld	0–0	Kick off / --:-- CET; Attendance / 60,886; Referee / Winkmann; Schalke 04 / Arminia Bielefeld; (yellow card) 78' Höwedes / (yellow card) 35' Schuler; (yellow card) 42' Kamper; (yellow card) 64' Herzig
13	2008-10-28	Bundesliga	10	A	Karlsruher SC	0–3	Kick off / --:-- CET; Attendance / 29,164; Referee / Herbert Fandel (Germany); Karlsruher SC / Schalke 04; (yellow card) 22' Franz; (yellow card) 85' Carnell / 15' Bordon; 19' Kurányi; 68', (yellow card) 55' Farfán; (yellow card) 61' Engelaar
14	2008-11-01	Bundesliga	11	A	Energie Cottbus	0–2	Kick off / --:-- CET; Attendance / 16,640; Referee / Michael Weiner (Germany); Energie Cottbus / Schalke 04; (yellow card) 45+1' Rivić; (yellow card) 76' Ziebig / (yellow card) 41' Rafinha; (red card) 52' Engelaar; 80', (yellow card) 67' Westermann; (yellow card) 78' Ernst; 90' Farfán
15	2008-11-08	Bundesliga	12	H	Bayern Munich	1–2	Kick off / --:-- CET; Attendance / 61,673; Referee / Knut Kircher (Germany); Schalke 04 / Bayern Munich; 5' Farfán; (yellow card) 22' Ernst; (yellow card) 37' Rakitić / 3' Toni; 31' Ribéry; (yellow card) 35' Borowski; (yellow card) 36' Lúcio; (yellow card) 43' Zé Roberto; (yellow card) 86' Demichelis
16	2008-11-15	Bundesliga	13	A	Bayer Leverkusen	3–4	Kick off / --:-- CET; Attendance / 19,200; Referee / Gräfe; Bayer Leverkusen / Schalke 04; 30' Kießling; 41' Helmes; (yellow card) 59' Castro; (yellow card) 67' Castro; 84' Dum / 42' Rafinha; 65' Bordon; 82' Engelaar; 85' Kurányi
17	2008-11-22	Bundesliga	14	H	Borussia Mönchengladbach	3–1	Kick off / --:-- CET
18	2008-11-29	Bundesliga	15	A	VfB Stuttgart	0–2	Kick off / --:-- CET
19	2008-12-06	Bundesliga	16	H	Hertha BSC	1–0	Kick off / --:-- CET
20	2009-12-13	Bundesliga	17	A	1899 Hoffenheim	1–1	Kick off / --:-- CET
21	2009-01-31	Bundesliga	18	A	Hannover 96	0–1	Kick off / --:-- CET
22	2009-02-07	Bundesliga	19	H	Werder Bremen	1–0	Kick off / --:-- CET
23	2009-02-14	Bundesliga	20	A	VfL Bochum	1–2	Kick off / --:-- CET
24	2009-02-21	Bundesliga	21	H	Borussia Dortmund	1–1	Kick off / --:-- CET
25	2009-02-28	Bundesliga	22	A	Eintracht Frankfurt	2–1	Kick off / --:-- CET
26	2009-03-07	Bundesliga	23	H	1. FC Köln	1–0	Kick off / --:-- CET
27	2009-03-14	Bundesliga	24	A	VfL Wolfsburg	3–4	Kick off / --:-- CET
28	2009-03-21	Bundesliga	25	H	Hamburger SV	1–2	Kick off / --:-- CET
29	2009-04-04	Bundesliga	26	A	Arminia Bielefeld	2–0	Kick off / --:-- CET
30	2009-04-10	Bundesliga	27	H	Karlsruher SC	2–0	Kick off / --:-- CET
31	2009-04-18	Bundesliga	28	H	Energie Cottbus	4–0	Kick off / --:-- CET
32	2009-04-25	Bundesliga	29	A	Bayern Munich	1–0	Kick off / --:-- CET
33	2009-05-02	Bundesliga	30	H	Bayer Leverkusen	1–2	Kick off / --:-- CET
34	2009-05-09	Bundesliga	31	A	Borussia Mönchengladbach	0–1	Kick off / --:-- CET
35	2009-05-12	Bundesliga	32	H	VfB Stuttgart	1–2	Kick off / --:-- CET
36	2008-05-16	Bundesliga	33	A	Hertha BSC	0–0	Kick off / --:-- CET
37	2009-05-23	Bundesliga	34	H	1899 Hoffenheim	2–3	Kick off / --:-- CET

Last updated: 2008-11-29
Source: Fussballdaten
^{1}Schalke 04 goals come first.
National flags for Ground and Opponent columns are only shown when different from that of Schalke 04.
M = Match; Ground: H = Home, A = Away, N = Neutral, HR = Home replacement, AR = Away replacement.

== See also ==
- FC Schalke 04
- 2008–09 UEFA Champions League
- 2008–09 Bundesliga
- 2008–09 DFB-Pokal
