= Mohamed Amsif =

Association football player (born 1989)

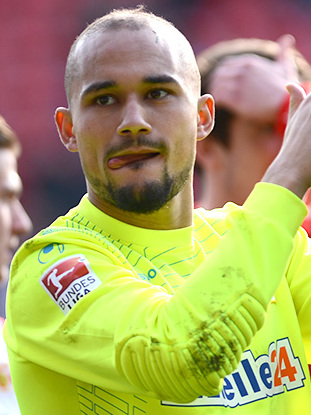
- Amsif with Union Berlin in 2015

Personal information
- Full name: Mohamed Amsif
- Date of birth: 7 February 1989 (age 37)
- Place of birth: Düsseldorf, West Germany
- Height: 1.87 m (6 ft 2 in)
- Position: Goalkeeper

Team information
- Current team: SV Wehen Wiesbaden (goalkeeping coach)

Youth career
- 1995–2001: TuRU Düsseldorf
- 2001–2003: DSV 04 Lierenfeld
- 2003–2005: Wuppertaler SV Borussia
- 2005–2008: Schalke 04

Senior career*
Years	Team	Apps	(Gls)
2008–2010	Schalke 04	0	(0)
2008–2010	Schalke 04 II	23	(0)
2010–2014	FC Augsburg	27	(0)
2013	FC Augsburg II	1	(0)
2014–2016	Union Berlin	6	(0)
2016–2017	Ittihad Tanger	24	(0)
2017–2022	FUS Rabat	71	(0)
2022–2025	SV Wehen Wiesbaden	2	(0)
Total		154	(0)

International career
2006	Germany U18	1	(0)
2008	Germany U19	1	(0)
2009–2010	Germany U20	6	(0)
2012	Morocco U23	3	(0)
2011–2021	Morocco	6	(0)

Managerial career
- 2025–: SV Wehen Wiesbaden (goalkeeping coach)
Medal record
Men's football
Representing Morocco
African Nations Championship
Winner	2020 Cameroon
- * Club domestic league appearances and goals

Mohamed Amsif (Arabic: محمد أمسيف; born 7 February 1989) is a former professional footballer who played as a goalkeeper. Born in Germany, he represented Morocco at the 2012 Africa Cup of Nations and 2012 Summer Olympics, playing in all three of their games in the latter. He is the current goalkeeping coach of SV Wehen Wiesbaden.

Amsif was part of the Moroccan squad at the 2020 African Nations Championship and the 2021 FIFA Arab Cup, winning the former. He attended the Gesamtschule Berger Feld.

== Career statistics ==
=== Club ===
Appearances and goals by club, season and competition
Club	Season	League			League Cup		Europe		Other		Total	
Club	Season	Division	Apps	Goals	Apps	Goals	Apps	Goals	Apps	Goals	Apps	Goals
Schalke 04	2008–09	Bundesliga	0	0	0	0	0	0	—		0	0
Schalke 04 II	2008–09	Regionalliga West	12	0	—		—		—		12	0
Schalke 04 II	2009–10	Regionalliga West	11	0	—		—		—		11	0
Schalke 04 II	Total		23	0	—		—		—		23	0
FC Augsburg	2010–11	2. Bundesliga	2	0	0	0	—		—		2	0
FC Augsburg	2011–12	Bundesliga	6	0	2	0	—		—		8	0
FC Augsburg	2012–13	Bundesliga	17	0	1	0	—		—		18	0
FC Augsburg	2013–14	Bundesliga	2	0	1	0	—		—		3	0
FC Augsburg	Total		27	0	4	0	—		—		31	0
Union Berlin	2014–15	2. Bundesliga	6	0	1	0	—		—		7	0
Union Berlin	2015–16	2. Bundesliga	0	0	0	0	—		—		0	0
Union Berlin	Total		6	0	1	0	—		—		7	0
Ittihad Tanger	2016–17	Botola	24	0	6	0	4	0	—		34	0
FUS Rabat	2017–18	Botola	19	0	0	0	—		—		19	0
FUS Rabat	2018–19	Botola	11	0	0	0	—		—		11	0
FUS Rabat	2019–20	Botola	21	0	0	0	—		—		21	0
FUS Rabat	2020–21	Botola	13	0	0	0	—		—		13	0
FUS Rabat	2021–22	Botola	7	0	0	0	—		—		7	0
FUS Rabat	Total		71	0	0	0	—		—		71	0
SV Wehen Wiesbaden	2022–23	3. Liga	2	0	1	0	—		0	0	3	0
SV Wehen Wiesbaden	2023–24	2. Bundesliga	0	0	0	0	—		0	0	0	0
SV Wehen Wiesbaden	Total		2	0	1	0	—		0	0	3	0
Career total			153	0	12	0	4	0	0	0	169	0

== Honours ==
Schalke 04 U19

- Under 19 Bundesliga: 2005–06

SV Wehen Wiesbaden

- Hessian Cup: 2024–25

Morocco

- African Nations Championship: 2020
