= Ralf Fährmann =

German footballer (born 1988)

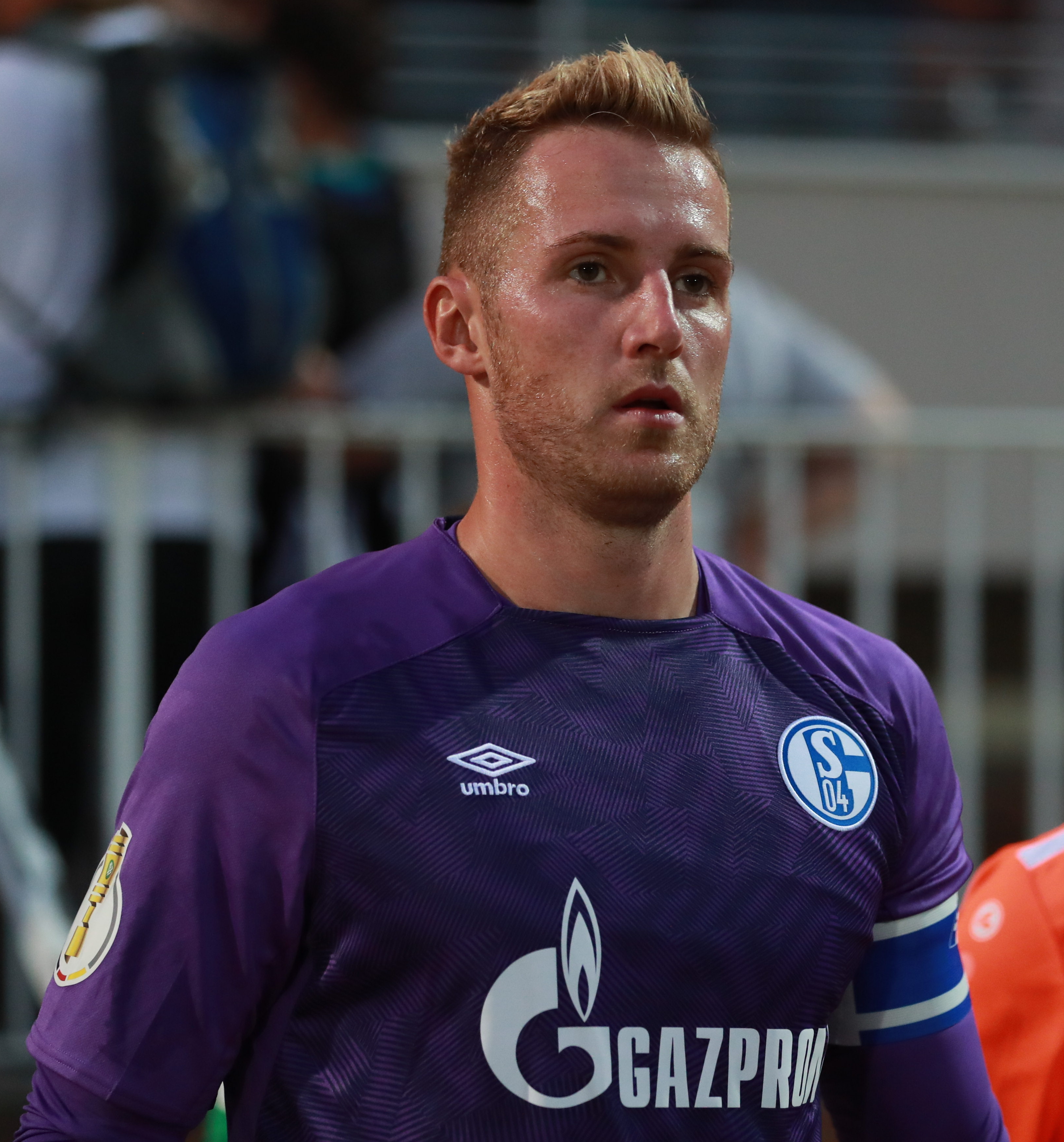
- Fährmann with Schalke 04 in 2018

Personal information
- Full name: Ralf Fährmann
- Date of birth: 27 September 1988 (age 38)
- Place of birth: Karl-Marx-Stadt, East Germany
- Height: 1.97 m (6 ft 6 in)
- Position: Goalkeeper

Youth career
- 1995–1998: VfB Chemnitz
- 1998–2003: Chemnitzer FC
- 2003–2007: Schalke 04

Senior career*
Years	Team	Apps	(Gls)
2007–2009	Schalke 04 II	39	(0)
2007–2009	Schalke 04	3	(0)
2009–2010	Eintracht Frankfurt II	6	(0)
2009–2011	Eintracht Frankfurt	18	(0)
2011–2025	Schalke 04	224	(0)
2012–2013	Schalke 04 II	4	(0)
2019–2020	→ Norwich City (loan)	1	(0)
2020	→ Brann (loan)	0	(0)
Total		295	(0)

International career
2003–2004	Germany U16	5	(0)
2004–2005	Germany U17	14	(0)
2005–2006	Germany U18	3	(0)
2006	Germany U19	4	(0)
2007–2008	Germany U20	5	(0)
2008	Germany U21	1	(0)
- * Club domestic league appearances and goals

Ralf Fährmann (German pronunciation: [ˈʁalf ˈfɛːɐ̯man]; born 27 September 1988) is a German former professional footballer who played as a goalkeeper.

== Club career ==
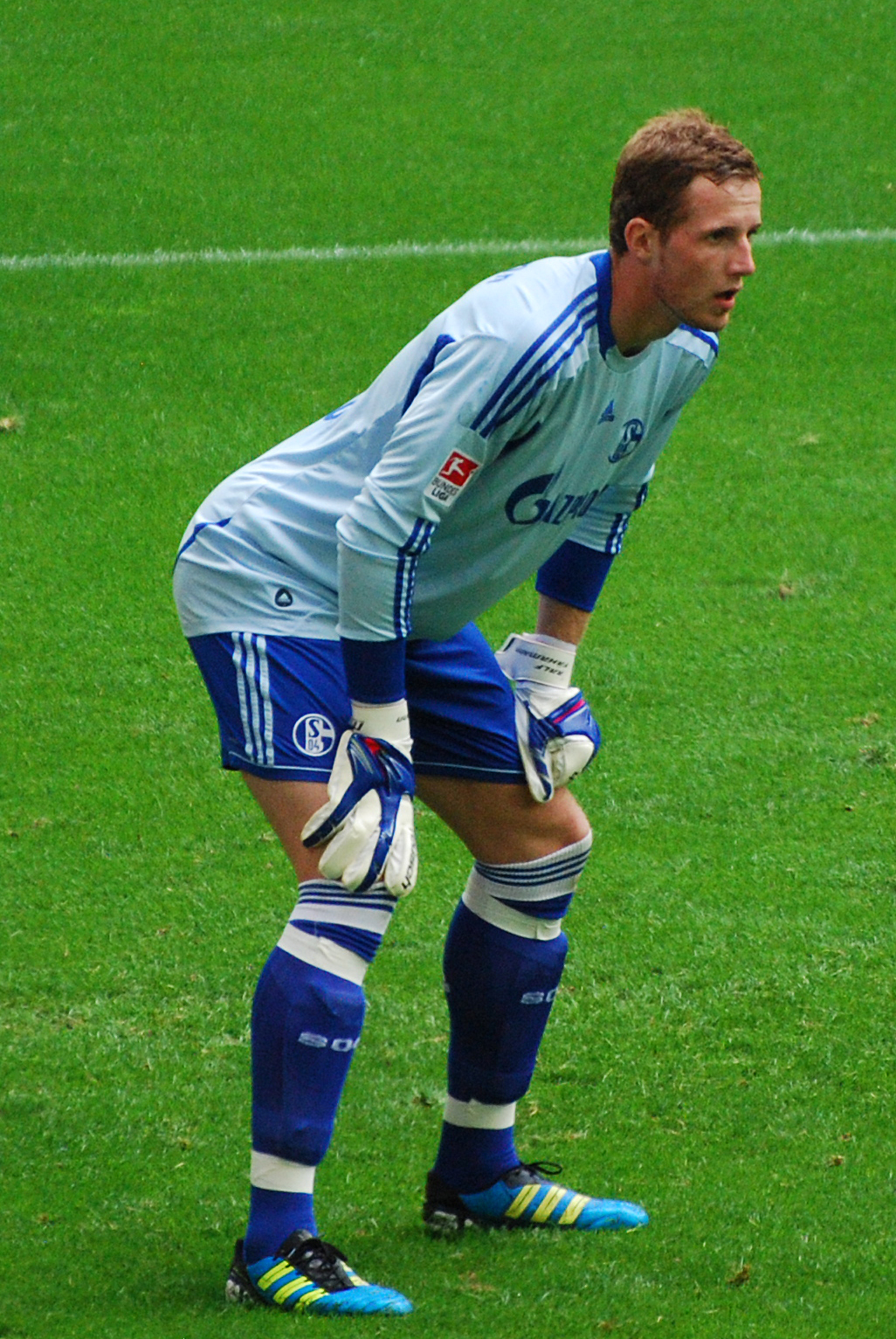
Fährmann playing for Schalke 04

Fährmann made his professional debut for Schalke 04 on 13 September 2008 in 3–3 draw away to Borussia Dortmund. On 16 September 2008, he played his first international match, against APOEL in a UEFA Cup tie.

At the end of the 2008–09 season, he left Schalke and moved to Eintracht Frankfurt on free transfer, signing a contract valid to 30 June 2012.

Fährmann returned to Schalke in 2011 after the team sold Manuel Neuer to Bayern Munich. In the 2011 DFL-Supercup, Fährmann was named Man of the Match. After 90 minutes, the game finished 0–0 and it went on directly to a penalty shootout. Fährmann saved two penalty kicks, one from Kevin Großkreutz and one from Ivan Perišić, thus allowing Schalke to raise the Supercup trophy for the first time in the club's history. In the start of the 2013–14 season, he was named second choice goalkeeper behind Timo Hildebrand. While Hildebrand was injured, he became the first choice goalkeeper and his impressive performances saw him keep the number one spot for the remainder of the season.

On 4 May 2014, Schalke announced that Fährmann extended his contract with Schalke until 30 June 2019.

Fährmann made his 200th appearance in all competitions for Schalke 04 on 18 April 2018 in a 0–1 home defeat to Eintracht Frankfurt in DFB-Pokal.

On 5 July 2019, Fährmann joined Norwich City on loan until the end of 2019–20 season. On 10 March 2020, he left Norwich and was loaned to SK Brann until 30 June 2020. On 23 April 2020, he left for Germany due to the COVID-19 pandemic. On 9 June, Brann confirmed that Fährmann would not return for the last day of the loan contract, so he did not play a competitive game for the club.

On 1 April 2026, Fährmann announced his retirement from professional football.

== International career ==
Fährmann is a former member of several Germany national youth football teams.

== Personal life ==
Fährmann attended the Gesamtschule Berger Feld. His brother Falk Fährmann is also a goalkeeper, who played for FSV Zwickau.

== Career statistics ==
=== Club ===
Appearances and goals by club, season and competition
Club	Season	League			Cup		Europe		Other		Total	
Club	Season	Division	Apps	Goals	Apps	Goals	Apps	Goals	Apps	Goals	Apps	Goals
Schalke 04 II	2007–08	Oberliga Westfalen	28	0	—		—		—		28	0
Schalke 04 II	2008–09	Regionalliga West	11	0	—		—		—		11	0
Schalke 04 II	Total		39	0	—		—		—		39	0
Schalke 04	2008–09	Bundesliga	3	0	1	0	1 (Note: Appearances in UEFA Cup)	0	—		5	0
Eintracht Frankfurt II	2009–10	Regionalliga Süd	6	0	—		—		—		6	0
Eintracht Frankfurt	2009–10	Bundesliga	3	0	0	0	—		—		3	0
Eintracht Frankfurt	2010–11	Bundesliga	15	0	1	0	—		—		16	0
Eintracht Frankfurt	Total		18	0	1	0	—		—		19	0
Schalke 04	2011–12	Bundesliga	9	0	0	0	4 (Note: Appearances in UEFA Europa League)	0	1 (Note: Appearance in DFL-Supercup)	0	14	0
Schalke 04	2012–13	Bundesliga	0	0	0	0	0	0	—		0	0
Schalke 04	2013–14	Bundesliga	22	0	1	0	4 (Note: Appearances in UEFA Champions League)	0	—		27	0
Schalke 04	2014–15	Bundesliga	25	0	1	0	6	0	—		32	0
Schalke 04	2015–16	Bundesliga	34	0	1	0	8	0	—		43	0
Schalke 04	2016–17	Bundesliga	34	0	4	0	11	0	—		49	0
Schalke 04	2017–18	Bundesliga	34	0	5	0	—		—		39	0
Schalke 04	2018–19	Bundesliga	17	0	2	0	6	0	—		25	0
Schalke 04	2020–21	Bundesliga	22	0	3	0	—		—		25	0
Schalke 04	2021–22	2. Bundesliga	6	0	2	0	—		—		8	0
Schalke 04	2022–23	Bundesliga	12	0	0	0	—		—		12	0
Schalke 04	2023–24	2. Bundesliga	9	0	1	0	—		—		10	0
Schalke 04	2024–25	2. Bundesliga	0	0	0	0	—		—		0	0
Schalke 04	Total		224	0	20	0	39	0	1	0	284	0
Schalke 04 II	2012–13	Regionalliga West	2	0	—		—		—		2	0
Schalke 04 II	2013–14	Regionalliga West	2	0	—		—		—		2	0
Schalke 04 II	Total		4	0	—		—		—		4	0
Norwich City (loan)	2019–20	Premier League	1	0	1	0	—		1 (Note: Appearance in EFL Cup)	0	3	0
Brann (loan)	2020	Eliteserien	0	0	—		—		—		0	0
Career total			295	0	23	0	40	0	2	0	360	0

== Honours ==
Schalke 04

- DFL-Supercup: 2011
- 2. Bundesliga: 2021–22
