= 2016–17 FC Schalke 04 season =

Schalke 04
2016–17 season
- President: Clemens Tönnies
- Head coach: Markus Weinzierl
- Stadium: Veltins-Arena
- Bundesliga: 10th
- DFB-Pokal: Quarter-finals
- UEFA Europa League: Quarter-finals
- Top goalscorer: League: Guido Burgstaller (9); All: Guido Burgstaller (12)
- Highest home attendance: 62,271
- Lowest home attendance: 42,210
- Average home league attendance: 60,703
- Biggest win: Schalke 4–0 Gladbach
- Biggest defeat: Bayern 3–0 Schalke; Bremen 3–0 Schalke
Home colours	Away colours	Third colours

The 2016–17 FC Schalke 04 season was the 113th season in the club's football history. In 2015–16 the club plays in the Bundesliga, the top tier of German football. It is the club's twenty-fourth consecutive season in the Bundesliga, having been promoted from the 2. Bundesliga in 1991.

== Players ==
=== Squad ===
Note: Flags indicate national team as defined under FIFA eligibility rules; some limited exceptions apply. Players may hold more than one non-FIFA nationality.

No.	Pos.	Nation	Player
1	GK	GER	Ralf Fährmann
4	DF	GER	Benedikt Höwedes (captain)
5	MF	GER	Johannes Geis
6	DF	BIH	Sead Kolašinac
7	MF	GER	Max Meyer
8	MF	GER	Leon Goretzka
9	FW	ARG	Franco Di Santo
10	MF	ALG	Nabil Bentaleb (on loan from Tottenham)
11	MF	UKR	Yevhen Konoplyanka (on loan from Sevilla)
13	FW	CMR	Eric Maxim Choupo-Moting
14	DF	GHA	Baba Rahman (on loan from Chelsea)
15	MF	GER	Dennis Aogo
17	MF	FRA	Benjamin Stambouli
18	MF	GER	Daniel Caligiuri
19	FW	AUT	Guido Burgstaller
20	DF	GER	Thilo Kehrer

No.	Pos.	Nation	Player
21	MF	AUT	Alessandro Schöpf
22	DF	JPN	Atsuto Uchida
23	DF	ESP	Coke
24	DF	GER	Holger Badstuber (on loan from Bayern Munich)
25	FW	NED	Klaas-Jan Huntelaar (vice-captain)
27	DF	GER	Sascha Riether
28	DF	GER	Joshua Bitter
29	DF	BRA	Naldo
30	GK	GER	Timon Wellenreuther
31	DF	SRB	Matija Nastasić
32	FW	GHA	Bernard Tekpetey
33	FW	KOS	Donis Avdijaj
35	GK	GER	Alexander Nübel
36	FW	SUI	Breel Embolo
40	DF	GER	Phil Neumann
42	FW	USA	Haji Wright

=== Transfers ===
==== In ====
No.	Pos.	Name	Age	NAT	Moving from	Type	Transfer Window	Contract ends	Transfer fee	Sources
18	MF	Daniel Caligiuri	29	Italy	VfL Wolfsburg	Transfer	Winter	2020	€2,500,000	
19	FW	Guido Burgstaller	27	Austria	1. FC Nürnberg	Transfer	Winter	2020	€1,500,000	
24	DF	Holger Badstuber	27	Germany	Bayern Munich	Loan	Winter	2017	Free	
36	FW	Breel Embolo	19	Switzerland	FC Basel	Transfer	Summer	2021	€22,500,000	
17	MF	Benjamin Stambouli	26	France	Paris Saint-Germain	Transfer	Summer	2020	€8,500,000	
23	DF	Coke	29	Spain	Sevilla FC	Transfer	Summer	2019	€4,000,000	
—	MF	Robert Leipertz	23	Germany	1. FC Heidenheim	Transfer	Summer	2017	€300,000	
29	DF	Naldo	33	Brazil	VfL Wolfsburg	Transfer	Summer	2018	Free	
10	MF	Nabil Bentaleb	21	Algeria	Tottenham Hotspur	Loan	Summer	2017	€1,000,000	
14	DF	Baba Rahman	22	Ghana	Chelsea	Loan	Summer	2017	€500,000	
11	MF	Yevhen Konoplyanka	26	Ukraine	Sevilla FC	Loan	Summer	2017	Free	
28	DF	Joshua Bitter	19	Germany	Schalke 04 U19	Promoted	Summer	2019	—	
32	FW	Bernard Tekpetey	18	Ghana	FC Schalke 04 II	Promoted	Summer	2018	—	—
11	MF	Christian Clemens	24	Germany	Mainz 05	End of Loan	Summer	2017	—	—
24	DF	Kaan Ayhan	21	Turkey	Eintracht Frankfurt	End of Loan	Summer	2017	—	—
30	GK	Timon Wellenreuther	20	Germany	Mallorca	End of Loan	Summer	2017	—	—
36	FW	Felix Platte	20	Germany	Darmstadt 98	End of Loan	Summer	2018	—	—
33	MF	Donis Avdijaj	19	Kosovo	Sturm Graz	End of Loan	Summer	2019	—	—

==== Out ====
No.	Pos.	Name	Age	NAT	Moving to	Type	Transfer Window	Transfer fee	Sources
3	DF	Júnior Caiçara	27	Brazil	İstanbul Başakşehir	Transfer	Winter	€3,000,000	
16	FW	Fabian Reese	19	Germany	Karlsruher SC	Loan	Winter	Free	
34	GK	Fabian Giefer	26	Germany	Bristol City F.C.	Loan	Winter	Free	
18	MF	Sidney Sam	28	Germany	Darmstadt 98	Loan	Winter	Free	
19	MF	Leroy Sané	20	Germany	Manchester City	Transfer	Summer	€50,000,000	
11	MF	Christian Clemens	24	Germany	Mainz 05	Transfer	Summer	€2,000,000	
—	MF	Robert Leipertz	23	Germany	FC Ingolstadt 04	Transfer	Summer	€1,500,000	
12	MF	Marco Höger	26	Germany	1. FC Köln	Transfer	Summer	€1,300,000	
2	DF	Marvin Friedrich	20	Germany	FC Augsburg	Transfer	Summer	€1,000,000	
24	DF	Kaan Ayhan	21	Turkey	Fortuna Düsseldorf	Transfer	Summer	€500,000	
32	DF	Joël Matip	24	Cameroon	Liverpool	Transfer	Summer	Free	
33	MF	Roman Neustädter	28	Russia	Fenerbahçe S.K.	Transfer	Summer	Free	
30	GK	Michael Gspurning	35	Austria	1. FC Union	Transfer	Summer	Free	
36	FW	Felix Platte	20	Germany	Darmstadt 98	Loan	Summer	Free	
11	MF	Younès Belhanda	26	Morocco	FC Dynamo	End of Loan	Summer	—	—
23	MF	Pierre-Emile Højbjerg	20	Denmark	Bayern Munich	End of Loan	Summer	—	—

== Club ==
=== Kit ===
Supplier: Adidas / Sponsor: Gazprom

Home	Home alt.	Home alt. 2	Home alt. 3	Away	Away Alt.	Away 2017-18	Third	Third Alt.

== Friendly matches ==
Win Draw Loss

5 July 2016 Friendly	Guangzhou R&F (China)	1–6	(Germany) Schalke 04	Guangzhou, China
19:30 CST (UTC+8); 13:30 CEST (UTC+2)	Zhizhao 41'	Report	Geis 5'; Goretzka 16', 28'; Huntelaar 45'; Di Santo 47', 89'	Stadium: Guangdong Provincial People's Stadium; Attendance: 9,830; Referee: Wang Zhe (China)

7 July 2016 Friendly	Guangzhou Evergrande Taobao (China)	0–0 (5–4 p)	(Germany) Schalke 04	Foshan, China
19:35 CST (UTC+8); 13:35 CEST (UTC+2)		Report		Stadium: Century Lotus Stadium; Referee: Hei Xiaohu (China)
	Penalties
	Dianzuo (penalty scored); Feng (penalty scored); Pengfei (penalty scored); Zepeng (penalty scored); Ruibao (penalty scored)		(penalty scored) Naldo; (penalty scored) Geis; (penalty scored) Di Santo; (penalty scored) Riether; (penalty missed) Sam

13 July 2016 Friendly	Eintracht Rheine (Germany)	1–9	(Germany) Schalke 04	Rheine, Germany
18:30 CEST (UTC+2)	Woltering 32'	Report	Aogo 15', 17'; Choupo-Moting 40', 65', 84'; Meyer 42'; Huntelaar 57'; Ademoglu 63'; Sam 77'	Stadium: OBI Arena; Attendance: 5,000; Referee: Lennert Brüggemann

16 July 2016 Friendly	Luzern (Switzerland)	4–2	(Germany) Schalke 04	Lucerne, Switzerland
18:30 CEST (UTC+2)	Neumayr 2' (pen.); M. Schneuwly 47', 54'; Oliveira 89'	Report	Huntelaar 66'; Nastasić 76'	Stadium: swissporarena Attendance: 5,191; Referee: Alain Bieri

19 July 2016 Friendly	DSC Wanne-Eickel (Germany)	0–13	(Germany) Schalke 04	Herne, Germany
19:00 CEST (UTC+2)		Report	Riether 18'; Di Santo 37', 40'; Sam 39', 42'; Tekpetey 48', 65'; Embolo 55', 71', 79'; Huntelaar 61', 68', 73' (pen.)	Stadium: Mondpalast-Arena; Attendance: 4,923; Referee: Fabian Maibaum

22 July 2016 Friendly	Holstein Kiel (Germany)	1–2	(Germany) Schalke 04	Kiel, Germany
17:30 CEST (UTC+2)	Salem 18' (pen.)	Report	Meyer 10'; Huntelaar 34'	Stadium: Holstein-Stadion; Attendance: 6,663; Referee: Robert Schroder

4 August 2016 Friendly	Bologna (Italy)	1–2	(Germany) Schalke 04	Mittersill, Austria
18:30 CEST (UTC+2)	Brienza 68'	Report	Di Santo 10'; Tekpetey 81'	Stadium: Waldstadion Mittersill; Attendance: 1,500; Referee: Wolfram Aufschnaiter (Austria)

7 August 2016 Friendly	Fiorentina (Italy)	1–3	(Germany) Schalke 04	Zell am See, Austria
18:30 CEST (UTC+2)	Kalinić 29'	Report	Choupo-Moting 5', 84'; Naldo 70'	Stadium: Alois Latini Stadion; Attendance: 2,000; Referee: Michael Achleitner (Austria)

14 August 2016 Friendly	Schalke 04 (Germany)	3–2	(Spain) Athletic Bilbao	Gelsenkirchen, Germany
17:30 CEST (UTC+2)	Naldo 15'; Huntelaar 19'; Geis 82'	Report	San José 58'; Aduriz 90+1'	Stadium: VELTINS-Arena; Attendance: 42,404; Referee: Guido Winkmann

10 January 2017 Friendly	Schalke 04 (Germany)	2–1	(Belgium) KV Oostende	Benidorm, Spain
17:00 CET (UTC+1)	Goretzka 40'; Konoplyanka 46'	Report	Pedersen 21'; El Ghanassy (yellow card) 30' (yellow-red card)	Stadium: Estadio Municipal Guillermo Amor; Attendance: 1,000; Referee: Lajara (Spain)

14 January 2017 Friendly	Chemnitzer FC (Germany)	2–1	(Germany) Schalke 04	Chemnitz, Germany
14:00 CET (UTC+1)	Fink 13'; Mast 23'	Report	Naldo 74'	Stadium: community4you ARENA; Attendance: 8,504; Referee: Eugen Ostrin (Germany)

23 March 2017 Friendly	Hannover 96 (Germany)	3–1	(Germany) Schalke 04	Hanover, Germany
18:30 CET (UTC+1)	Füllkrug 13'; Prib 60'; Sobiech 70'	Report	Coke 56'	Stadium: HDI-Arena; Attendance: 6,500; Referee: Bibiana Steinhaus (Germany)

== Competitions ==
Win Draw Loss

=== Overview ===
Competition	First match	Last match	Starting round	Final position	Record							
Competition	First match	Last match	Starting round	Final position	Pld	W	D	L	GF	GA	GD	Win %
Bundesliga	27 August 2016	20 May 2017	Matchday 1	10th	34	11	10	13	45	40	+5	32.35
DFB-Pokal	20 August 2016	1 March 2017	First round	Quarter-finals	4	3	0	1	11	7	+4	75.00
Europa League	15 September 2016	20 April 2017	Group stage	Quarter-finals	12	7	3	2	19	11	+8	58.33
Total					50	21	13	16	75	58	+17	42.00

Last updated: 27 May 2017
Source: Competitions

=== Bundesliga ===
==== League table ====
Pos	Team	Pld	W	D	L	GF	GA	GD	Pts
8	Werder Bremen	34	13	6	15	61	64	−3	45
9	Borussia Mönchengladbach	34	12	9	13	45	49	−4	45
10	Schalke 04	34	11	10	13	45	40	+5	43
11	Eintracht Frankfurt	34	11	9	14	36	43	−7	42
12	Bayer Leverkusen	34	11	8	15	53	55	−2	41

Source: DFB
Rules for classification: 1) Points; 2) Goal difference; 3) Goals scored; 4) Head-to-head points; 5) Head-to-head goal difference; 6) Head-to-head away goals scored; 7) Away goals scored; 8) Play-off.

==== Results summary ====
Overall								Home						Away					
Pld	W	D	L	GF	GA	GD	Pts	W	D	L	GF	GA	GD	W	D	L	GF	GA	GD
34	11	10	13	45	40	+5	43	8	5	4	29	15	+14	3	5	9	16	25	−9

Last updated: 27 May 2017.
Source: Bundesliga

==== Results by round ====
Round	1	2	3	4	5	6	7	8	9	10	11	12	13	14	15	16	17	18	19	20	21	22	23	24	25	26	27	28	29	30	31	32	33	34
Ground	A	H	A	H	A	H	A	H	A	H	A	H	A	H	H	A	H	H	A	H	A	H	A	H	A	H	A	H	A	H	A	A	H	A
Result	L	L	L	L	L	W	D	W	D	W	W	W	L	L	D	L	W	L	D	W	D	D	L	W	W	D	L	W	L	D	W	L	D	D
Position	15	17	17	17	18	16	16	14	12	12	11	8	8	10	11	11	10	11	12	11	10	12	13	11	9	9	12	10	11	11	10	10	10	10

Updated to match(es) played on 27 May 2017. Source: Bundesliga
A = Away; H = Home; W = Win; D = Draw; L = Loss

==== Matches ====
27 August 2016 1	Eintracht Frankfurt	1–0	Schalke 04	Frankfurt
15:30 CEST (UTC+2)	Meier 13'; Hector (red card) 79'; Varela (yellow card) 87'; Mascarell (yellow card) 88'	Report	Júnior Caiçara (yellow card) 67'; Geis (yellow card) 89'	Stadium: Commerzbank-Arena; Attendance: 47,000; Referee: Wolfgang Stark

9 September 2016 2	Schalke 04	0–2	Bayern Munich	Gelsenkirchen
20:30 CEST (UTC+2)	Höwedes (yellow card) 38'; Baba (yellow card) 90+1'	Report	Hummels (yellow card) 17'; Sanches (yellow card) 69'; Vidal (yellow card) 71'; Lewandowski 81'; Thiago (yellow card) 90+1'; Kimmich 90+2'	Stadium: VELTINS-Arena; Attendance: 62,271; Referee: Manuel Gräfe

18 September 2016 3	Hertha BSC	2–0	Schalke 04	Berlin
17:30 CEST (UTC+2)	Pekarík (yellow card) 63'; Weiser 64'; Stocker 74'	Report	Fährmann (yellow card) 63'	Stadium: Olympiastadion Berlin; Attendance: 49,251; Referee: Deniz Aytekin

21 September 2016 4	Schalke 04	1–3	1. FC Köln	Gelsenkirchen
20:00 CEST (UTC+2)	Huntelaar 36'; Geis (yellow card) 68'; Bentaleb (yellow card) 84'	Report	Jojić (yellow card) 33'; Osako 38'; Modeste 77'; Zoller 83'	Stadium: VELTINS-Arena; Attendance: 60,876; Referee: Robert Hartmann

25 September 2016 5	1899 Hoffenheim	2–1	Schalke 04	Sinsheim
15:30 CEST (UTC+2)	Kramarić 17'; Bičakčić (yellow card) 26'; Rupp 41'	Report	Choupo-Moting 4'; Di Santo (yellow card) 90+6'	Stadium: WIRSOL Rhein-Neckar-Arena; Attendance: 29,288; Referee: Tobias Welz

2 October 2016 6	Schalke 04	4–0	Borussia Mönchengladbach	Gelsenkirchen
17:30 CEST (UTC+2)	Choupo-Moting 52' (pen.); Embolo 56', 83'; Goretzka 58'	Report		Stadium: VELTINS-Arena; Attendance: 62,271; Referee: Sascha Stegemann

15 October 2016 7	FC Augsburg	1–1	Schalke 04	Augsburg
15:30 CEST (UTC+2)	Stafylidis (yellow card) 21'; Altıntop (yellow card) 39'; Baier 77'	Report	Geis (yellow card) 27'; Höwedes (yellow card) 55'; Bentaleb 65'; Konoplyanka (yellow card) 87'	Stadium: WWK ARENA; Attendance: 30,660; Referee: Tobias Stieler

23 October 2016 8	Schalke 04	3–0	Mainz 05	Gelsenkirchen
17:30 CEST (UTC+2)	Bentaleb 23', 61'; Meyer 48'; Höwedes (yellow card) 72'; Kolašinac (yellow card) 77'	Report	Balogun (yellow card) 21'; Córdoba (yellow card) 41'; Bell (yellow card) 82'	Stadium: VELTINS-Arena; Attendance: 59,357; Referee: Daniel Siebert

29 October 2016 9	Borussia Dortmund	0–0	Schalke 04	Dortmund
18:30 CEST (UTC+2)	Kagawa (yellow card) 7'; Weigl (yellow card) 12'; Dembélé (yellow card) 41'; Papastathopoulos (yellow card) 64'	Report	Nastasić (yellow card) 34'; Bentaleb (yellow card) 36'; Kolašinac (yellow card) 76'; Goretzka (yellow card) 90'	Stadium: SIGNAL IDUNA PARK; Attendance: 80,179; Referee: Felix Brych

6 November 2016 10	Schalke 04	3–1	Werder Bremen	Gelsenkirchen
17:30 CET (UTC+1)	Schöpf 35', 63'; Bentaleb 38', (yellow card) 54'; Stambouli (yellow card) 84'	Report	Veljković (yellow card) 37'; Gnabry 42' (pen.); Petsos (yellow card) 43'; S. García (yellow card) 68'	Stadium: VELTINS-Arena; Attendance: 61,263; Referee: Günter Perl

19 November 2016 11	VfL Wolfsburg	0–1	Schalke 04	Wolfsburg
15:30 CET (UTC+1)	Bruma (yellow card) 38'; Seguin (yellow card) 69'	Report	Höwedes (yellow card) 77'; Goretzka 82'; Kolašinac (yellow card) 85'	Stadium: VOLKSWAGEN ARENA; Attendance: 30,000; Referee: Felix Zwayer

27 November 2016 12	Schalke 04	3–1	Darmstadt 98	Gelsenkirchen
15:30 CET (UTC+1)	Kolašinac 26'; Choupo-Moting 60'; Schöpf 90'	Report	Heller 6'; Fedetskyi (yellow card) 39'; Sirigu (yellow card) 50'	Stadium: VELTINS-Arena; Attendance: 58,703; Referee: Frank Willenborg

3 December 2016 13	RB Leipzig	2–1	Schalke 04	Leipzig
18:30 CET (UTC+1)	Werner 2' (pen.); Kolašinac 47' (o.g.); Halstenberg (yellow card) 73'	Report	Fährmann (yellow card) 1'; Kolašinac 31'; Nastasić (yellow card) 39'; Schöpf (yellow card) 49'; Höwedes (yellow card) 51'; Bentaleb (yellow card) 80'	Stadium: Red Bull Arena; Attendance: 42,558; Referee: Bastian Dankert

11 December 2016 14	Schalke 04	0–1	Bayer Leverkusen	Gelsenkirchen
17:30 CET (UTC+1)	Naldo (red card) 4'; Meyer (yellow card) 13'; Baba (yellow card) 81'; Kehrer (yellow card) 88'	Report	Toprak (yellow card) 13'; Baumgartlinger (yellow card) 38'; Kießling 89'; Havertz (yellow card) 90+3'	Stadium: VELTINS-Arena; Attendance: 60,821; Referee: Deniz Aytekin

17 December 2016 15	Schalke 04	1–1	SC Freiburg	Gelsenkirchen
15:30 CET (UTC+1)	Geis (yellow card) 42'; Konoplyanka 74'	Report	Niederlechner 64'	Stadium: VELTINS-Arena; Attendance: 60,445; Referee: Manuel Gräfe

20 December 2016 16	Hamburger SV	2–1	Schalke 04	Hamburg
20:00 CET (UTC+1)	Jung (yellow card) 41'; Müller 60'; Wood 82'; Mathenia (yellow card) 90'	Report	Meyer (yellow card) 26'; Schöpf (yellow card) 42'; Kehrer (yellow card) 75'; Bentaleb (yellow card) 78'; Avdijaj 89'	Stadium: Volksparkstadion; Attendance: 49,789; Referee: Jochen Drees

21 January 2017 17	Schalke 04	1–0	FC Ingolstadt	Gelsenkirchen
15:30 CET (UTC+1)	Nastasić (yellow card) 79'; Burgstaller 90+2'	Report		Stadium: VELTINS-Arena; Attendance: 58,004; Referee: Harm Osmers

27 January 2017 18	Schalke 04	0–1	Eintracht Frankfurt	Gelsenkirchen
20:30 CET (UTC+1)	Bentaleb (yellow card) 77'; Kolašinac (yellow card) 86'	Report	Meier 33'; Oczipka (yellow card) 48'	Stadium: VELTINS-Arena; Attendance: 60,885; Referee: Robert Hartmann

4 February 2017 19	Bayern Munich	1–1	Schalke 04	Munich
15:30 CET (UTC+1)	Lewandowski 9'; Martínez (yellow card) 77'	Report	Naldo 13'; Bentaleb (yellow card) 61'	Stadium: Allianz Arena; Attendance: 75,000; Referee: Marco Fritz

11 February 2017 20	Schalke 04	2–0	Hertha BSC	Gelsenkirchen
18:30 CET (UTC+1)	Burgstaller 41'; Goretzka 62'; Bentaleb (yellow card) 85'	Report	Haraguchi (yellow card) 54'; Ibišević (yellow card) 60'	Stadium: VELTINS-Arena; Attendance: 61,981; Referee: Markus Schmidt

19 February 2017 21	1. FC Köln	1–1	Schalke 04	Cologne
17:30 CET (UTC+1)	Subotić (yellow card) 21'; Modeste 43'; Sørensen (yellow card) 72'	Report	Schöpf 2', (yellow card) 81'; Stambouli (yellow card) 51'; Naldo (yellow card) 59'	Stadium: RheinEnergieSTADION; Attendance: 50,000; Referee: Tobias Stieler

26 February 2017 22	Schalke 04	1–1	1899 Hoffenheim	Gelsenkirchen
17:30 CET (UTC+1)	Schöpf 5'	Report	Süle (yellow card) 67'; Hübner (yellow card) 69'; Rudy 79'	Stadium: VELTINS-Arena; Attendance: 58,839; Referee: Deniz Aytekin

4 March 2017 23	Borussia Mönchengladbach	4–2	Schalke 04	Mönchengladbach
18:30 CET (UTC+1)	Johnson 28', 64'; Wendt 67'; Raffael 76'	Report	Nastasić (yellow card) 18'; Bentaleb 38' (pen.); Goretzka 82'; Kehrer (yellow card) 85'; Huntelaar (yellow card) 88'; Di Santo (yellow card) 90+2'	Stadium: BORUSSIA-PARK; Attendance: 54,014; Referee: Manuel Gräfe

12 March 2017 24	Schalke 04	3–0	FC Augsburg	Gelsenkirchen
15:30 CET (UTC+1)	Burgstaller 4', 29'; Höwedes (yellow card) 31'; Caligiuri 34'; Bentaleb (yellow card) 57'; Aogo (yellow card) 78'	Report		Stadium: VELTINS-Arena; Attendance: 59,481; Referee: Robert Kampka

19 March 2017 25	Mainz 05	0–1	Schalke 04	Mainz
15:30 CET (UTC+1)	Jairo (yellow card) 25'; Bungert (yellow card) 63'	Report	Burgstaller (yellow card) 28'; Kolašinac 50'; Badstuber (yellow card) 69'; Schöpf (yellow card) 82'; Choupo-Moting (yellow card) 90+4'	Stadium: OPEL ARENA; Attendance: 30,847; Referee: Wolfgang Stark

1 April 2017 26	Schalke 04	1–1	Borussia Dortmund	Gelsenkirchen
15:30 CEST (UTC+2)	Kehrer 77'; Bentaleb (yellow card) 90+1'	Report	Aubameyang 53', (yellow card) 54'; Papastathopoulos (yellow card) 90+1'	Stadium: VELTINS-Arena; Attendance: 62,271; Referee: Felix Zwayer

4 April 2017 27	Werder Bremen	3–0	Schalke 04	Bremen
20:00 CEST (UTC+2)	Gebre Selassie 24'; Kruse 76' (pen.); M. Eggestein 80'	Report	Goretzka (yellow card) 73'; Fährmann (yellow card) 80'	Stadium: Weser-Stadion; Attendance: 42,100; Referee: Robert Hartmann

8 April 2017 28	Schalke 04	4–1	VfL Wolfsburg	Gelsenkirchen
15:30 CEST (UTC+2)	Burgstaller 6', 77'; Goretzka 23'; Caligiuri 48'; Nastasić (yellow card) 58'	Report	Arnold (yellow card) 2'; Gómez 79' (pen.); Bazoer (yellow card) 86'	Stadium: VELTINS-Arena; Attendance: 61,298; Referee: Benjamin Brand

16 April 2017 29	Darmstadt 98	2–1	Schalke 04	Darmstadt
17:30 CEST (UTC+2)	Vrančić 11'; Sirigu (yellow card) 39'; Altıntop (yellow card) 54'; Holland (yellow card) 63'; Banggaard (yellow card) 83'; Esser (yellow card) 89'; Gondorf 90+3'	Report	Kehrer (yellow card) 69' (red card) 81'; Meyer (yellow card) 72'; Coke 75'	Stadium: Jonathan-Heimes-Stadion am Böllenfalltor; Attendance: 17,400; Referee: Patrick Ittrich

23 April 2017 30	Schalke 04	1–1	RB Leipzig	Gelsenkirchen
17:30 CEST (UTC+2)	Stambouli (yellow card) 29'; Coke (yellow card) 43'; Huntelaar 46'; Meyer (yellow card) 78'	Report	Werner 14'; Halstenberg (yellow card) 40'; Keïta (yellow card) 73'	Stadium: VELTINS-Arena; Attendance: 60,916; Referee: Günter Perl

28 April 2017 31	Bayer Leverkusen	1–4	Schalke 04	Leverkusen
20:30 CEST (UTC+2)	Hilbert (yellow card) 25'; Kampl (yellow card) 49'; Kießling 69'; Bellarabi (yellow card) 70'	Report	Burgstaller 6', 50'; Höwedes 10'; Schöpf 18'	Stadium: BayArena; Attendance: 30,210; Referee: Marco Fritz

7 May 2017 32	SC Freiburg	2–0	Schalke 04	Freiburg im Breisgau
17:30 CEST (UTC+2)	Niederlechner 22', 31' (pen.)	Report	Höwedes (yellow card) 46'; Avdijaj (yellow card) 63'	Stadium: Schwarzwald-Stadion; Attendance: 24,000; Referee: Robert Kampka

13 May 2017 33	Schalke 04	1–1	Hamburger SV	Gelsenkirchen
15:30 CEST (UTC+2)	Nastasić (yellow card) 8'; Burgstaller 25'; Kolašinac (yellow card) 55'; Bentaleb (yellow card) 69'	Report	Diekmeier (yellow card) 49'; Lasogga 90+2'	Stadium: VELTINS-Arena; Attendance: 62,271; Referee: Markus Schmidt

20 May 2017 34	FC Ingolstadt	1–1	Schalke 04	Ingolstadt
15:30 CEST (UTC+2)	Groß 41' (pen.); Lezcano (yellow card) 47'	Report	Avdijaj 2'; Stambouli (red card) 63'; Tekpetey (yellow card) 90+2'	Stadium: Audi Sportpark; Attendance: 15,200; Referee: Frank Willenborg

=== DFB-Pokal ===
20 August 2016 First round	FC 08 Villingen	1–4	Schalke 04	Freiburg im Breisgau
15:30 CEST (UTC+2)	Reho (yellow card) 44'; Geng (yellow card) 49'; Ketterer 90', (yellow card) 90'	Report	Aogo 10'; Embolo 19'; Geis 75'; Huntelaar 86'	Stadium: Schwarzwald-Stadion; Attendance: 14,400; Referee: Patrick Alt

26 October 2016 Second round	1. FC Nürnberg	2–3	Schalke 04	Nuremberg
20:45 CEST (UTC+2)	Petrák (yellow card) 41'; Burgstaller (yellow card) 49'; Brečko (yellow card) 55'; Baba 59' (o.g.); Kempe 68' (pen.); Kammerbauer (yellow card) 90'	Report	Konoplyanka 20', 45'; Huntelaar 31'; Bentaleb (yellow card) 43'; Júnior Caiçara (yellow card) 67'; Schöpf (yellow card) 85'	Stadium: Stadion Nürnberg; Attendance: 28,281; Referee: Frank Willenborg

8 February 2017 Round of 16	SV Sandhausen	1–4	Schalke 04	Sandhausen
18:30 CET (UTC+1)	Höler (yellow card) 34'; Wooten 64'; Pledl (yellow card) 74'	Report	Stambouli (yellow card) 35'; Schöpf 38'; Caligiuri 43'; Naldo 45+1'; Konoplyanka 71', (yellow card) 78'	Stadium: Hardtwaldstadion; Attendance: 14,500; Referee: Benjamin Brand

1 March 2017 Quarter-finals	Bayern Munich	3–0	Schalke 04	Munich
20:45 CET (UTC+1)	Lewandowski 3', 29'; Thiago 16'; Ribéry (yellow card) 31'	Report	Badstuber (yellow card) 74' (yellow-red card) 77'	Stadium: Allianz Arena; Attendance: 75,000; Referee: Daniel Siebert

=== UEFA Europa League ===
==== Group stage ====
Pos	Team	Pld	W	D	L	GF	GA	GD	Pts	Qualification	SCH	KRA	SAL	NCE
1	(Germany) Schalke 04	6	5	0	1	9	3	+6	15	Advance to knockout phase	—	2–0	3–1	2–0
2	(Russia) Krasnodar	6	2	1	3	8	8	0	7	Advance to knockout phase	0–1	—	1–1	5–2
3	(Austria) Red Bull Salzburg	6	2	1	3	6	6	0	7		2–0	0–1	—	0–1
4	(France) Nice	6	2	0	4	5	11	−6	6		0–1	2–1	0–2	—

Source: UEFA
Rules for classification: Group stage tiebreakers

15 September 2016 1	Nice (France)	0–1	(Germany) Schalke 04	Nice, France
21:05 CEST (UTC+2)	Seri (yellow card) 72'; Balotelli (yellow card) 90'	Report	Baba (yellow card) 32', (goal) 75'; Stambouli (yellow card) 44'	Stadium: Allianz Riviera; Attendance: 21,378; Referee: Alberto Undiano Mallenco (Spain)

29 September 2016 2	Schalke 04 (Germany)	3–1	(Austria) Red Bull Salzburg	Gelsenkirchen, Germany
19:00 CEST (UTC+2)	Goretzka 15'; Ćaleta-Car 47' (o.g.); Höwedes 58'	Report	Laimer (yellow card) 25'; Upamecano (yellow card) 33'; Soriano 72', (yellow card) 90+1'; Ćaleta-Car (yellow card) 76'	Stadium: VELTINS-Arena; Attendance: 48,374; Referee: Serdar Gözübüyük (Netherlands)

20 October 2016 3	Krasnodar (Russia)	0–1	(Germany) Schalke 04	Krasnodar, Russia
20:00 MSK (UTC+3); 19:00 CEST (UTC+2)	Gazinsky (yellow card) 90+3'	Report	Konoplyanka 11'; Naldo (yellow card) 70'; Di Santo (yellow card) 85'	Stadium: Krasnodar Stadium; Attendance: 33,550; Referee: Mark Clattenburg (England)

3 November 2016 4	Schalke 04 (Germany)	2–0	(Russia) Krasnodar	Gelsenkirchen, Germany
21:05 CET (UTC+1)	Baba (yellow card) 18'; Júnior Caiçara 25'; Bentaleb 28'; Höwedes (yellow card) 33'; Nastasić (yellow card) 45+1'	Report	Laborde (yellow card) 53'; Eboue (yellow card) 73'	Stadium: VELTINS-Arena; Attendance: 42,210; Referee: Slavko Vinčić (Slovenia)

24 November 2016 5	Schalke 04 (Germany)	2–0	(France) Nice	Gelsenkirchen, Germany
19:00 CET (UTC+1)	Konoplyanka 14'; Tekpetey (yellow card) 50' (yellow-red card) 90+3'; Kehrer (yellow card) 67'; Aogo 80' (pen.)	Report	Dalbert (yellow card) 28'; Dante (yellow card) 47'; Boscagli (yellow card) 62'; Cardinale (yellow card) 90+4'	Stadium: VELTINS-Arena; Attendance: 51,504; Referee: Aliyar Aghayev (Azerbaijan)

8 December 2016 6	Red Bull Salzburg (Austria)	2–0	(Germany) Schalke 04	Wals-Siezenheim, Austria
21:05 CET (UTC+1)	Schlager 22'; Radosevic 90+4'	Report		Stadium: Red Bull Arena; Attendance: 23,133; Referee: Radu Petrescu (Romania)

==== Knockout phase ====
===== Round of 32 =====
16 February 2017 First leg	PAOK (Greece)	0–3	(Germany) Schalke 04	Thessaloniki, Greece
22:05 EET (UTC+2); 21:05 CET (UTC+1)	Leovac (yellow card) 34'; Léo Matos (yellow card) 57'; Varela (yellow card) 89'	Report	Schöpf (yellow card) 7'; Burgstaller 27'; Goretzka (yellow card) 50'; Kolašinac (yellow card) 57'; Nastasić (yellow card) 67'; Meyer 81'; Huntelaar 89'	Stadium: Toumba Stadium; Attendance: 25,593; Referee: Xavier Estrada Fernández (Spain)

22 February 2017 Second leg	Schalke 04 (Germany)	1–1 (4–1 agg.)	(Greece) PAOK	Gelsenkirchen, Germany
18:00 CET (UTC+1)	Schöpf 23'; Goretzka (yellow card) 61'; Geis (yellow card) 64'; Huntelaar (yellow card) 77'	Report	Nastasić 25' (o.g.); Henrique (yellow card) 81'; Biseswar (yellow card) 88'	Stadium: VELTINS-Arena; Attendance: 50,619; Referee: Luca Banti (Italy)

===== Round of 16 =====
9 March 2017 First leg	Schalke 04 (Germany)	1–1	(Germany) Borussia Mönchengladbach	Gelsenkirchen, Germany
21:05 CET (UTC+1)	Kehrer (yellow card) 10'; Geis (yellow card) 14'; Burgstaller 25'	Report	Strobl (yellow card) 3'; Hofmann 15'; Jantschke (yellow card) 38'	Stadium: VELTINS-Arena; Attendance: 52,412; Referee: Björn Kuipers (Netherlands)

16 March 2017 Second leg	Borussia Mönchengladbach (Germany)	2–2 (3–3a agg.)	(Germany) Schalke 04	Mönchengladbach, Germany
21:05 CET (UTC+1)	Christensen 26'; Raffael (yellow card) 29'; Dahoud 45+2'; Jantschke (yellow card) 53'; Vestergaard (yellow card) 59'; Wendt (yellow card) 90+3'	Report	Goretzka 54'; Bentaleb 68' (pen.); Caligiuri (yellow card) 77'; Choupo-Moting (yellow card) 89'; Fährmann (yellow card) 90+1'	Stadium: BORUSSIA-PARK; Attendance: 46,283; Referee: Mark Clattenburg (England)

===== Quarter-finals =====
13 April 2017 First leg	Ajax (Netherlands)	2–0	(Germany) Schalke 04	Amsterdam, Netherlands
21:05 CEST (UTC+2)	Klaassen 23' (pen.), 52', (yellow card) 49'; Neres (yellow card) 89'	Report	Kehrer (yellow card) 87'; Stambouli (yellow card) 87'	Stadium: Amsterdam ArenA; Attendance: 52,384; Referee: Sergei Karasev (Russia)

20 April 2017 Second leg	Schalke 04 (Germany)	3–2 (a.e.t.) (3–4 agg.)	(Netherlands) Ajax	Gelsenkirchen, Germany
21:05 CEST (UTC+2)	Goretzka 53'; Burgstaller 56', (yellow card) 60'; Kolašinac (yellow card) 68'; Nastasić (yellow card) 86'; Caligiuri 101'	Report	Veltman (yellow card) 72' (yellow-red card) 80'; Viergever (yellow card) 90', (goal) 111'; Ziyech (yellow card) 90+5'; Younes 120'	Stadium: VELTINS-Arena; Attendance: 53,701; Referee: Ovidiu Hațegan (Romania)

== Statistics ==
=== Appearances and goals ===
Squad Season 2016–17
No	NAT	Player	Age	Contract ends	All A	Goal	Yellow card	(yellow card) (red card)	Red card	BL A	BL	Yellow card	(yellow card) (red card)	Red card	Cup A	Cup	Yellow card	(yellow card) (red card)	Red card	EL A	EL	Yellow card	(yellow card) (red card)	Red card
Goalkeepers
1	Germany	Ralf Fährmann	38	30.06.2019	49 (0)	0	4	0	0	34 (0)	0	3	0	0	4 (0)	0	0	0	0	11 (0)	0	1	0	0
30	Germany	Timon Wellenreuther	30	30.06.2017	0 (0)	0	0	0	0	0 (0)	0	0	0	0	0 (0)	0	0	0	0	0 (0)	0	0	0	0
34	Germany	Fabian Giefer	36	30.06.2018	1 (0)	0	0	0	0	0 (0)	0	0	0	0	0 (0)	0	0	0	0	1 (0)	0	0	0	0
35	Germany	Alexander Nübel	30	30.06.2018	0 (0)	0	0	0	0	0 (0)	0	0	0	0	0 (0)	0	0	0	0	0 (0)	0	0	0	0
Defenders
3	Brazil	Júnior Caiçara	37	30.06.2018	7 (2)	1	2	0	0	1 (2)	0	1	0	0	2 (0)	0	1	0	0	4 (0)	1	0	0	0
4	Germany	Benedikt Höwedes (C)	38	30.06.2020	46 (0)	2	8	0	0	31 (0)	1	7	0	0	4 (0)	0	0	0	0	11 (0)	1	1	0	0
6	Bosnia and Herzegovina	Sead Kolašinac	33	30.06.2017	33 (3)	3	7	0	0	24 (1)	3	5	0	0	3 (0)	0	0	0	0	6 (2)	0	2	0	0
14	Ghana	Baba Rahman	32	30.06.2017	14 (7)	1	4	0	0	7 (6)	0	2	0	0	2 (0)	0	0	0	0	5 (1)	1	2	0	0
15	Germany	Dennis Aogo	39	30.06.2017	9 (5)	2	1	0	0	3 (4)	0	1	0	0	1 (1)	1	0	0	0	5 (0)	1	0	0	0
20	Germany	Thilo Kehrer	30	30.06.2019	17 (8)	1	6	0	1	12 (4)	1	3	0	1	0 (1)	0	0	0	0	5 (3)	0	3	0	0
22	Japan	Atsuto Uchida	38	30.06.2018	0 (1)	0	0	0	0	0 (0)	0	0	0	0	0 (0)	0	0	0	0	0 (1)	0	0	0	0
23	Spain	Coke	39	30.06.2019	7 (1)	1	1	0	0	7 (1)	1	1	0	0	0 (0)	0	0	0	0	0 (0)	0	0	0	0
24	Germany	Holger Badstuber	37	30.06.2017	11 (1)	0	1	1	0	10 (0)	0	1	0	0	1 (0)	0	0	1	0	0 (1)	0	0	0	0
27	Germany	Sascha Riether	43	30.06.2017	6 (3)	0	0	0	0	3 (2)	0	0	0	0	0 (1)	0	0	0	0	3 (0)	0	0	0	0
28	Germany	Joshua Bitter	29	30.06.2019	0 (0)	0	0	0	0	0 (0)	0	0	0	0	0 (0)	0	0	0	0	0 (0)	0	0	0	0
29	Brazil	Naldo	44	30.06.2018	29 (0)	2	2	0	1	19 (0)	1	1	0	1	3 (0)	1	0	0	0	7 (0)	0	1	0	0
31	Serbia	Matija Nastasić	33	30.06.2019	34 (1)	0	9	0	0	21 (1)	0	6	0	0	3 (0)	0	0	0	0	10 (0)	0	3	0	0
Midfielders
2	USA	Weston McKennie	28	-	0 (1)	0	0	0	0	0 (1)	0	0	0	0	0 (0)	0	0	0	0	0 (0)	0	0	0	0
5	Germany	Johannes Geis	33	30.06.2019	22 (2)	1	6	0	0	17 (1)	0	4	0	0	1 (0)	1	0	0	0	4 (1)	0	2	0	0
7	Germany	Max Meyer	31	30.06.2018	27 (11)	2	4	0	0	18 (10)	1	4	0	0	2 (1)	0	0	0	0	7 (2)	1	0	0	0
8	Germany	Leon Goretzka	31	30.06.2018	39 (2)	8	4	0	0	30 (0)	5	2	0	0	2 (0)	0	0	0	0	7 (2)	3	2	0	0
10	Algeria	Nabil Bentaleb	31	30.06.2017	38 (6)	7	12	0	0	28 (4)	5	11	0	0	3 (0)	0	1	0	0	7 (2)	2	0	0	0
11	Ukraine	Yevhen Konoplyanka	37	30.06.2017	10 (17)	6	2	0	0	5 (12)	1	1	0	0	1 (1)	3	1	0	0	4 (4)	2	0	0	0
17	France	Benjamin Stambouli	36	30.06.2020	26 (11)	0	6	0	1	15 (8)	0	3	0	1	3 (0)	0	1	0	0	8 (3)	0	2	0	0
18/2	Italy	Daniel Caligiuri	38	30.06.2020	20 (3)	4	1	0	0	14 (2)	2	0	0	0	1 (1)	1	0	0	0	5 (0)	1	1	0	0
18	Germany	Sidney Sam	38	30.06.2018	0 (1)	0	0	0	0	0 (0)	0	0	0	0	0 (0)	0	0	0	0	0 (1)	0	0	0	0
21	Austria	Alessandro Schöpf	32	30.06.2019	30 (12)	8	6	0	0	22 (6)	6	4	0	0	3 (2)	1	1	0	0	6 (4)	1	1	0	0
Forwards
9	Argentina	Franco Di Santo	37	30.06.2019	5 (10)	0	3	0	0	3 (9)	0	2	0	0	1 (0)	0	0	0	0	1 (1)	0	1	0	0
13	Cameroon	Eric M. Choupo-Moting	37	30.06.2017	23 (7)	3	2	0	0	19 (4)	3	1	0	0	0 (2)	0	0	0	0	4 (1)	0	1	0	0
16	Germany	Fabian Reese	28	30.06.2019	2 (4)	0	0	0	0	1 (2)	0	0	0	0	0 (1)	0	0	0	0	1 (1)	0	0	0	0
19	Austria	Guido Burgstaller	37	30.06.2020	24 (1)	12	2	0	0	17 (1)	9	1	0	0	2 (0)	0	0	0	0	5 (0)	3	1	0	0
25	Netherlands	Klaas-Jan Huntelaar	43	30.06.2017	10 (14)	5	2	0	0	7 (9)	2	1	0	0	2 (1)	2	0	0	0	1 (4)	1	1	0	0
32	Ghana	Bernard Tekpetey	29	30.06.2018	1 (2)	0	1	1	0	0 (2)	0	1	0	0	0 (0)	0	0	0	0	1 (0)	0	0	1	0
33	Kosovo	Donis Avdijaj	30	30.06.2019	3 (9)	2	1	0	0	2 (6)	2	1	0	0	0 (0)	0	0	0	0	1 (3)	0	0	0	0
36	Switzerland	Breel Embolo	29	30.06.2021	7 (3)	3	0	0	0	4 (3)	2	0	0	0	1 (0)	1	0	0	0	2 (0)	0	0	0	0
—	Germany	Felix Schröter	30	30.06.2018	0 (0)	0	0	0	0	0 (0)	0	0	0	0	0 (0)	0	0	0	0	0 (0)	0	0	0	0
Total					—	74	97	2	3	—	45	67	0	3	—	11	5	1	0	—	18	25	1	0
Last updated: 17 May 2017

Players in white left the club during the season.
