= Leon Goretzka =

German footballer (born 1995)

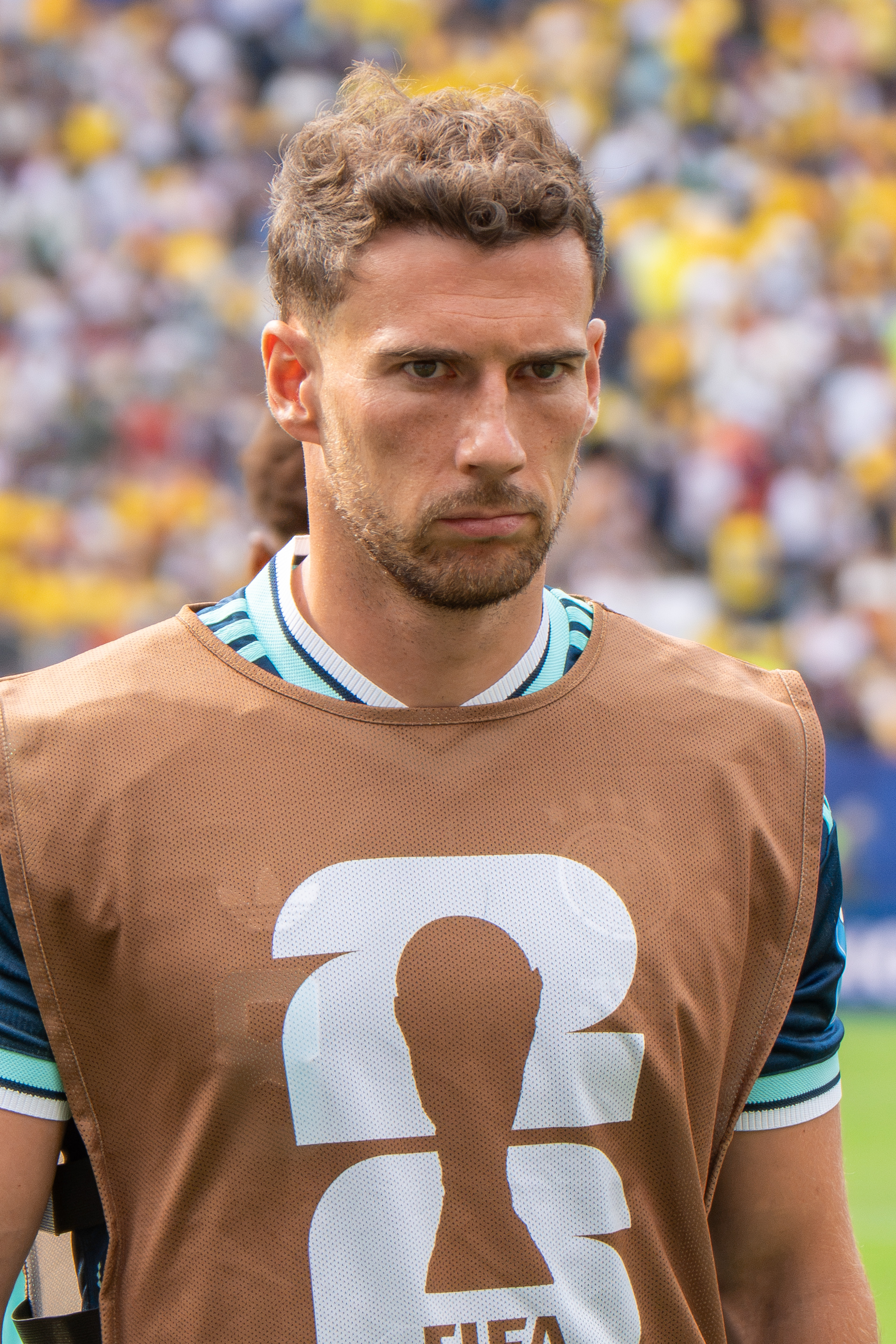
- Goretzka with Germany in 2026

Personal information
- Full name: Leon Christoph Goretzka
- Date of birth: 6 February 1995 (age 31)
- Place of birth: Bochum, Germany
- Height: 1.89 m (6 ft 2 in)
- Position: Midfielder

Team information
- Current team: Aston Villa
- Number: 27

Youth career
- 1999–2001: Werner SV 06 Bochum
- 2001–2012: VfL Bochum

Senior career*
Years	Team	Apps	(Gls)
2012–2013	VfL Bochum	32	(4)
2013–2018	Schalke 04	116	(14)
2015	Schalke 04 II	1	(0)
2018–2026	Bayern Munich	211	(40)
2026–	Aston Villa	5	(1)

International career^{‡}
2010–2011	Germany U16	10	(2)
2011–2012	Germany U17	17	(5)
2012–2014	Germany U19	3	(0)
2013–2015	Germany U21	10	(1)
2016	Germany U23	1	(0)
2014–	Germany	73	(15)
Medal record
Representing Germany
Summer Olympic Games
Silver medal – second place	2016 Rio de Janeiro	Team
UEFA European Under-17 Championship
Runner-up	2012 Slovenia
FIFA Confederations Cup
Winner	2017 Russia
- * Club domestic league appearances and goals as of 21:17, 21 November 2026 (UTC) ‡ National team caps and goals as of 16:07, 27 August 2026 (UTC)

Leon Christoph Goretzka (German pronunciation: [leˈoːn ɡoˈʁɛtska]; born 6 February 1995) is a German professional footballer who plays as a midfielder for Premier League club Aston Villa and the Germany national team.

Starting off his career with VfL Bochum in 2012, Goretzka went on play more than 100 Bundesliga games for Schalke 04 before signing with Bayern Munich in 2018. A full international since 2014, he has won more than 70 caps for the Germany national team, and represented his country at the FIFA World Cup in 2018, 2022 and 2026, and the UEFA European Championship in 2020. He was also a part of the Germany side that won the 2017 FIFA Confederations Cup, and the Germany Olympic team who earned silver medals at the 2016 Summer Olympics.

== Club career ==
=== VfL Bochum ===
In 1999, Goretzka started his career with Werner SV 06 Bochum. He stayed for two years with the WSV before making the move to VfL Bochum in 2001.

On 30 July 2012, Goretzka was awarded the 2012 under-17 Fritz Walter Medal in gold. On 4 August 2012, he made his professional debut for Bochum in the 2. Bundesliga against Dynamo Dresden in the rewirpowerSTADION.

Goretzka had an impressive 2012–13 season at Bochum and was their standout performer as Bochum narrowly avoided relegation from the 2. Bundesliga. During the season, Goretzka was linked to several big clubs around Europe including Bayern Munich, Manchester United, Arsenal and Real Madrid. Matthias Sammer, the then sporting director of Bayern Munich, reportedly met with Goretzka to try to convince him of joining Bayern in the summer of 2013.

=== Schalke 04 ===
On 30 June 2013, Schalke 04 confirmed the transfer of Goretzka from Bochum. He signed a five-year contract until 30 June 2018. The transfer fee was reported to be €3.250 million.

==== 2013–14 season ====
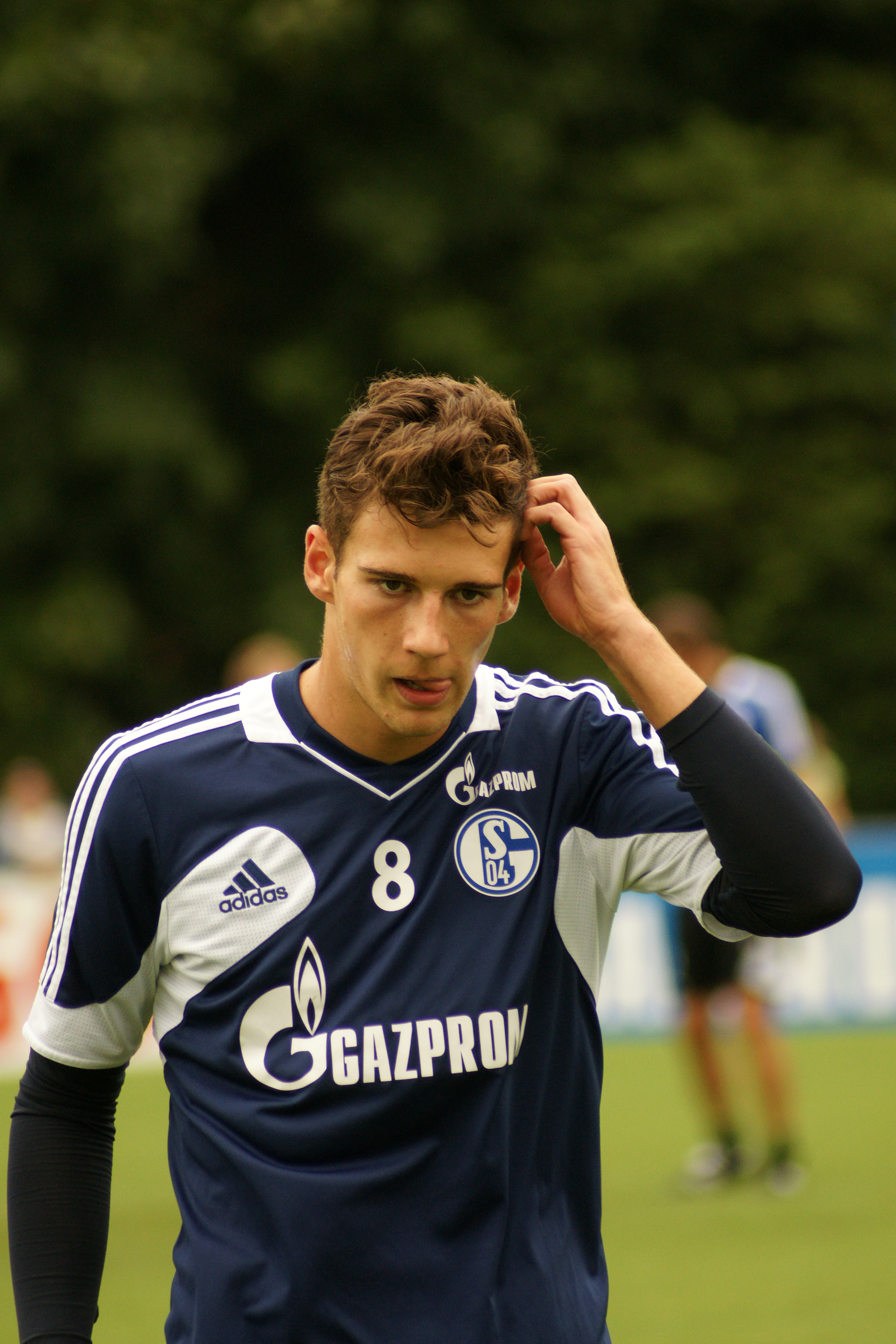
Goretzka training for Schalke 04 in 2013

During the 2013–14 season, Goretzka had a promising first season, scoring five goals in 32 appearances in all competitions. He became a regular starter in the second half of the season and helped Schalke finish in third place in the Bundesliga behind champions Bayern Munich and Borussia Dortmund. At the end of the season, Goretzka was called up for the 30-man preliminary squad of the Germany national team for the 2014 FIFA World Cup in Brazil. He made his debut in a friendly match against Poland prior to the World Cup.

==== 2014–15 season ====
During the 2014–15 season, Goretzka was limited to only 11 matches in all competitions due to a thigh injury. He returned from the injury on Matchday 24 against TSG 1899 Hoffenheim. Goretzka played in only 10 Bundesliga matches during the season. Schalke had a disappointing season and finished in sixth place in the Bundesliga.

==== 2015–16 season ====
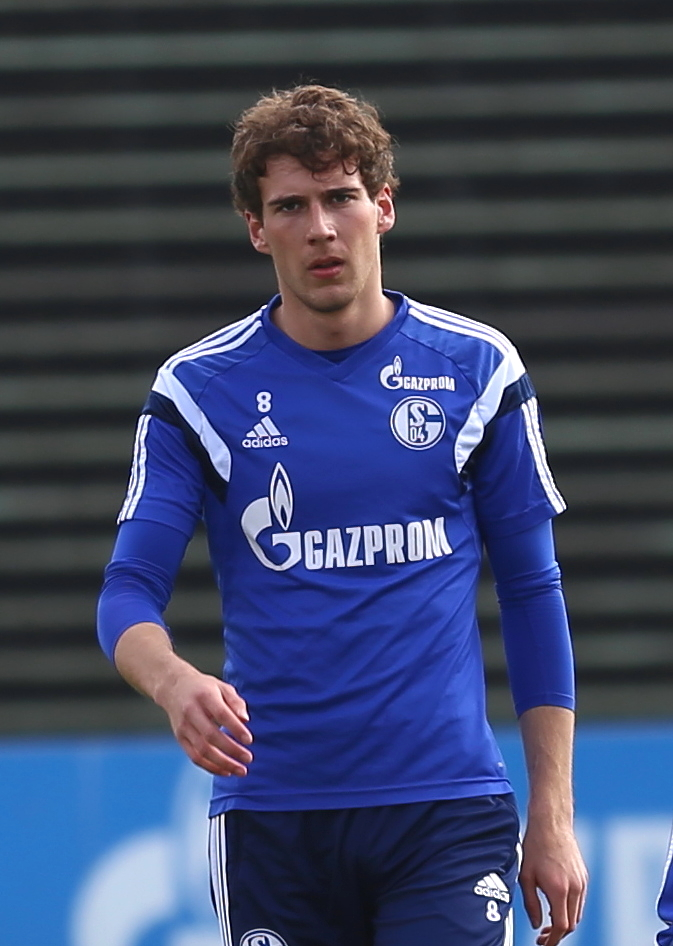
Goretzka training for Schalke 04 in 2015

During the 2015–16 season, Goretzka scored two goals in 34 appearances in all competitions. He was back to full fitness at the start of the season, but had several injuries throughout the season. Goretzka was also diagnosed with an inflammatory bowel disease during the season and said "I was diagnosed with a chronic bowel inflammation, which had been having a negative impact on my ability to recover." Goretzka continued: "So I completely changed what I eat, cutting out gluten, cow's milk, pork and nuts. As a result, I have fewer issues with my health and I can recover from a game much quicker.

==== 2016–17 season ====
During the 2016–17 season, Goretzka played in a career-high 41 matches in all competitions, scoring eight goals. This was regarded as Goretzka's best season to date as he flourished in a more attacking role. On 20 April, Goretzka received a concussion and suffered a double fracture of his jaw while playing against Ajax in the Europa League. He continued and played almost the entire match until he was substituted in the 84th minute. Schalke finished in a disappointing 10th place in the Bundesliga and did not qualify for European places.

==== 2017–18 season ====
During the 2017–18 season, Goretzka played in 29 matches in all competitions and scored four goals. This was his first season without European football since his arrival at Schalke in 2013. He had problems with stress reaction in bones in his lower leg, which kept him out of action for over two months. Goretzka helped Schalke finish second behind champions Bayern Munich to qualify for the UEFA Champions League for the first time since the 2014–15 season.

On 25 November 2017, he played in his 100th Bundesliga game in a match against Schalke's bitter rivals, Borussia Dortmund. On 19 January 2018, Goretzka announced that he would leave Schalke in the summer of 2018 and join rivals Bayern Munich. His decision did not go down well with the Schalke fans and board. Schalke's supervisory board chairman, Clemens Tönnies, expressed his first reaction regarding Goretzka's decision on a football talk show. Tönnies said: "My first reaction was, that you shouldn’t wear the jersey of Schalke anymore." Tönnies said that Goretzka could be forced to sit in the stands should his decision have a negative impact on the team.

=== Bayern Munich ===
==== 2018–19 season ====
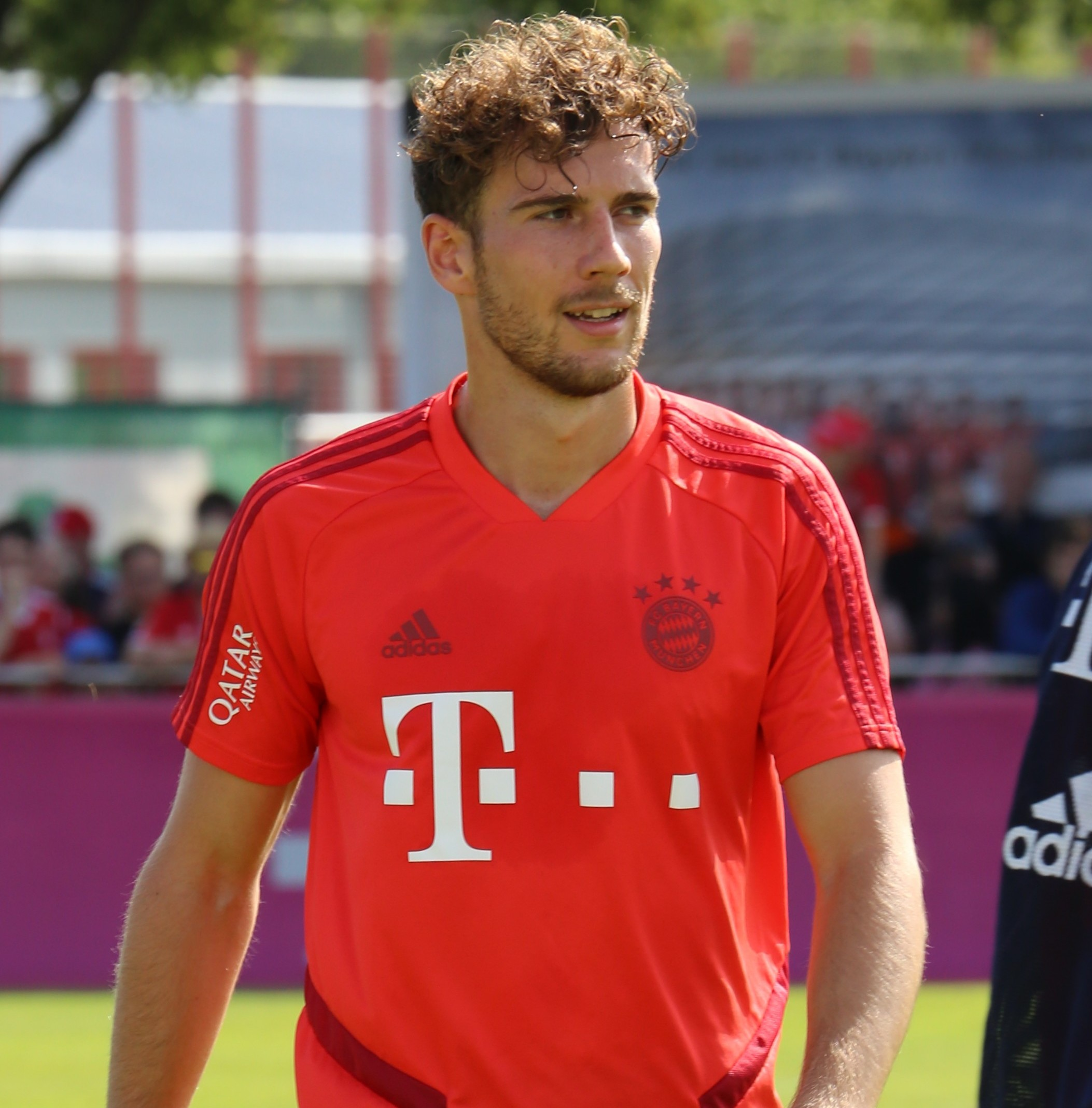
Goretzka with Bayern Munich in 2019

On 1 July 2018, Goretzka officially joined Bayern by signing a four-year contract until June 2022. On 12 August 2018, in the DFL Super Cup, he came on for Thomas Müller in the 64th minute. This was Goretzka's first appearance for Bayern. On 1 September, he scored his first goal for the club in a 3–0 away victory over VfB Stuttgart. The following year, on 19 January 2019, he scored his first ever brace in the Bundesliga, scoring twice in a 3–1 win over Hoffenheim. On 15 February 2019, Goretzka scored an own goal in a Bundesliga game after 13 seconds; no Bayern player had yet touched the ball.

On 18 May 2019, Goretzka won his first Bundesliga title as Bayern finished two points above Dortmund with 78 points. A week later, he won his first DFB-Pokal as Bayern defeated RB Leipzig 3–0 in the 2019 DFB-Pokal Final. He did not appear in the match as he was out injured.

==== 2019–20 season ====
On 26 November 2019, Goretzka scored his first Champions League goal during a 6–0 away win at Red Star Belgrade. He played vital part of Bayern's treble win under Hansi Flick. He played most of the games, including the whole Champions League campaign, making a midfield duo with Joshua Kimmich. After Benjamin Pavard got injured and Kimmich was asked to play as a right-back, Goretzka played in a box-to-box midfielder role next to Thiago, including in the Champions League final.

==== 2020–2026 ====
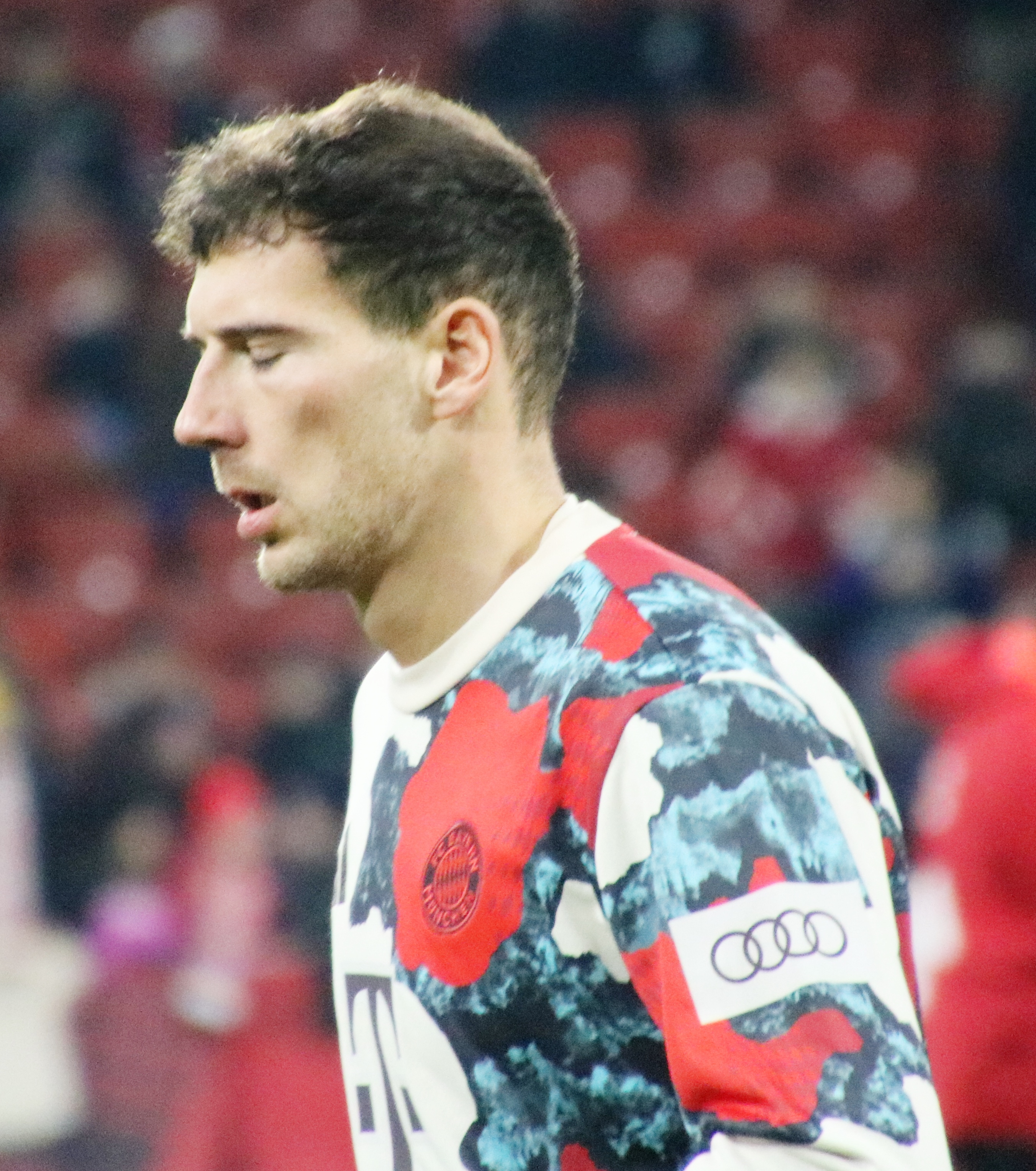
Goretzka training with Bayern Munich in 2025

On 24 September 2020, Goretzka scored a goal in a 2–1 win over Sevilla after extra time in the 2020 UEFA Super Cup. In April 2021, he missed the second leg against Paris Saint-Germain in the Champions League quarter-finals due to muscle problems. However, he ended the season winning his third consecutive Bundesliga title.

Ahead of the 2021–22 season, Goretzka was assigned the number 8 shirt left vacant by Javi Martínez. On 17 August 2021, Goretzka clinched the 2021 DFL-Super Cup with Bayern, playing the full 90 minutes. A month later, on 16 September, Bayern announced that Goretzka had signed a new contract, keeping him at the club until 2026.

On 12 October 2022, he scored a brace in a 4–2 away win over Viktoria Plzeň, in which Bayern secured their qualification to the Champions League knockout phase. On 24 January 2024, he made his 200th appearance for Bayern in all competitions in a 1–0 victory over Union Berlin.

On 30 January 2026, Bayern Munich announced that Goretzka would not have his contract with the club extended, with him leaving the club at the end of the 2025–26 season. On 11 April 2026, Goretzka scored Bayern's 102nd goal of the season in a 5–0 victory over St. Pauli, breaking the club's all-time single-season scoring record set in 1971–72.

=== Aston Villa ===
On 27 August 2026, Goretzka signed with English Premier League club Aston Villa on a free transfer. He signed a two-year contract, with a club option to extend the deal for another season. Due to a training ground injury, Goretzka didn't make his Aston Villa debut until 14 October, as a late substitute in a 6–0 Champions League victory over Fenerbahçe. He made his Premier League debut 3 days later in a 1–0 away win over Newcastle United. On 8 November, Goretzka scored his first goal for Villa in a 4–4 away draw against Manchester United.

== International career ==
=== Youth ===
On 15 October 2010, Goretzka made his Germany national U-16 football team debut in a friendly against Northern Ireland. He scored in the 3–2 victory. On 24 August 2011, he made his Germany national U-17 football team debut against Turkey in a 4–0 victory. In May 2012, he captained the Germany national U-17 football team at the 2012 UEFA European Under-17 Championship in Slovenia and led the German U-17 team all the way to the final against the Netherlands. In the final, Goretzka scored the first goal of the match; his goal was compensated in stoppage time, taking the scoreline to 1–1. The subsequent penalty shoot-out was won by the Netherlands.

On 8 August 2013, he debuted for the Germany national U-21 football team under Horst Hrubesch in a 0–0 draw against France, in which he had a magnificent match. Goretzka was contacted by the Poland national team but rejected the offer as he is not aware of any Polish background.

=== Olympic team ===
Alongside Schalke teammate Max Meyer, Goretzka was named in the squad for the 2016 Summer Olympics. He captained Germany in their first match against Mexico, but picked up a shoulder injury, and returned to Gelsenkirchen.

=== Senior ===
On 8 May 2014, Goretzka was included in the 30-men preliminary squad of the Germany national team for the 2014 FIFA World Cup by Germany's manager, Joachim Löw. On 13 May 2014, he made his debut in a 0–0 draw against Poland. After Germany's match against Poland, in which Goretzka had suffered a muscle injury, he was removed from the team's preparatory training camp and final squad for the 2014 World Cup in Brazil.

In May 2017, Goretzka was named in Germany's squad for the Confederations Cup in Russia. In the nation's opening match for the tournament on 20 June, he scored his first goal for Germany in a 3–2 Group B win over Australia. Goretzka scored two goals against Mexico in the semi-finals. Goretzka finished joint top scorer with Timo Werner and Lars Stindl in the competition with three goals. The Germany national team won the competition, beating Chile in the final in Saint Petersburg.

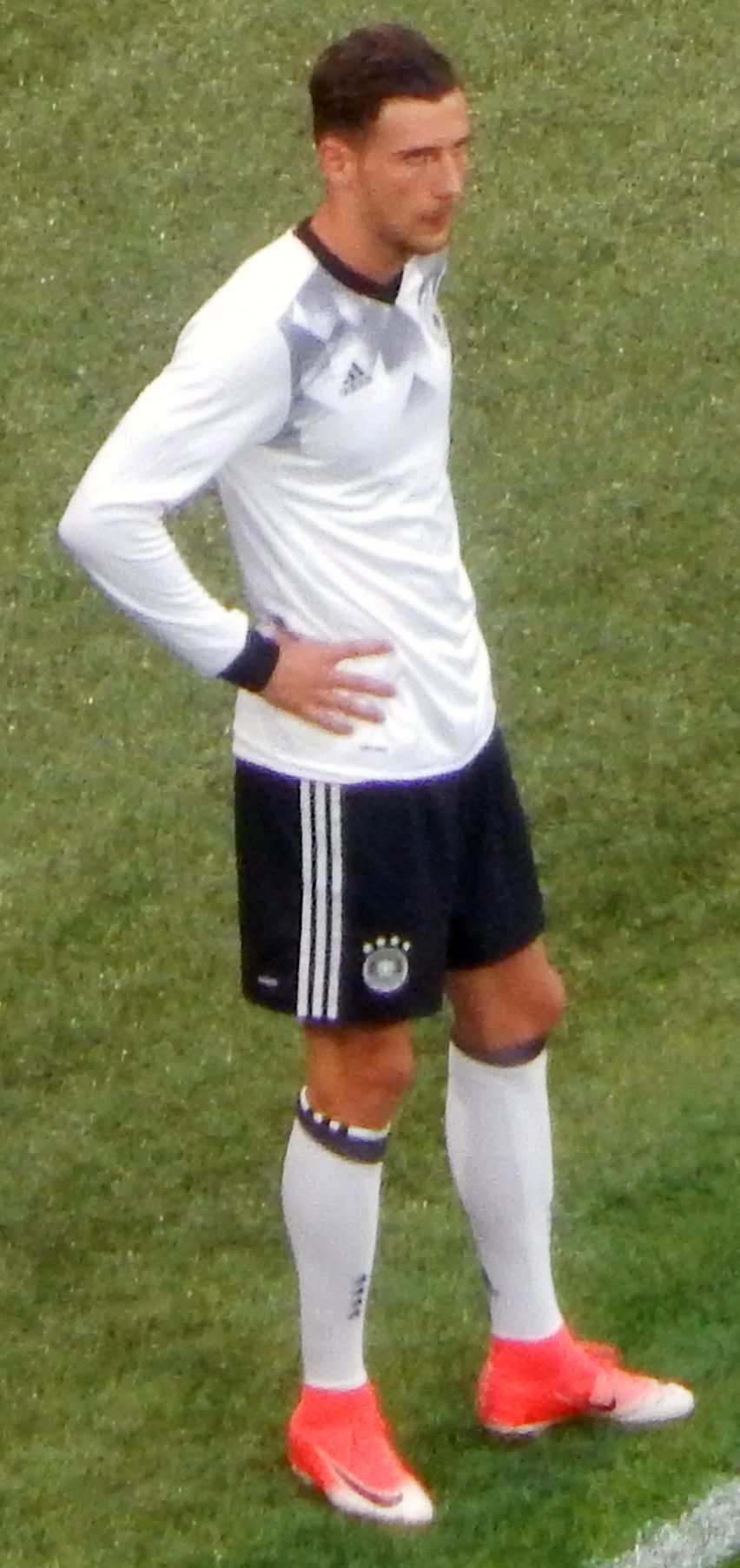
Goretzka with Germany in 2017

On 4 June 2018, Goretzka was included in Germany's final 23-man squad for the 2018 FIFA World Cup. On 27 June, he made his World Cup debut in the last match of the group stage in a 2–0 defeat to South Korea as his side got knocked out from the World Cup in the first round for the first time since 1938. On 19 May 2021, he was selected to the squad for the UEFA Euro 2020. He scored a goal in the final group fixture, a 2–2 draw against Hungary which saved Germany from elimination. On 10 November 2022, he was selected in the German squad for the 2022 FIFA World Cup in Qatar. In May 2024, he was excluded from the 26-man squad for the UEFA Euro 2024, hosted on home soil, by his former Bayern coach Julian Nagelsmann. Two years later, he was included in Germany's final squad for the 2026 FIFA World Cup.

== Playing style ==
In 2013, Goretzka was referred to as one of the brightest talents in German football. Peter Neururer, Goretzka's head coach at Bochum, said that he had "never seen an eighteen year old footballer which had a potential as Goretzka", and titled him as the "talent of the century". Goretzka has a potent eye for scoring goals and is known to possess good ball control ability and also has the ability to pick out passes for his teammates. He produces powerful shots from outside the penalty area. He is also well known for his excellent heading ability which sees him regularly score goals with his head. At 1.89 m, Goretzka's high-jumping ability helps him to win aerial battles against strong and tall defenders. His main position is as a central midfielder, although he can be deployed as a defensive midfielder, a right winger and a playmaker. Goretzka's game has often been compared to two of Germany's footballing greats, Lothar Matthäus and Michael Ballack.

== Personal life ==
Goretzka was born in Bochum, North Rhine-Westphalia. He completed his Abitur and graduated from the Alice-Salomon-Berufskolleg (Alice-Salomon-Vocational School) in Bochum. His father, Konrad, is an automotive engineer and electrical engineer for Opel. Goretzka's paternal ancestors were Ruhrpolen (Polish people in the Ruhr area). His mother, Katharina, was presbyter in the Protestant parish of Altenbochum-Laer and worked as a business manager in many institutions in Bochum.

In 2020, Goretzka launched an online initiative, "We Kick Corona", with his Bayern Munich teammate Joshua Kimmich, to help charitable, social or medical institutions during the COVID-19 pandemic.

Goretzka has been an activist against hate crimes, visiting the Dachau Holocaust memorial, and meeting Holocaust survivor Margot Friedländer. He is a critic of the far-right political party Alternative for Germany, calling them a "disgrace for Germany" and saying "when a party is supported and led by Holocaust revisionists and Corona deniers, then they are unmasking themselves".

Beside football, Goretzka has also invested in a marketing company in 2014. In August 2020, he started a real estate firm, LivinCG inmobilien GMBH, which is managed by his girlfriend.

== Career statistics ==
=== Club ===
As of match played 21 November 2026

Appearances and goals by club, season and competition
Club	Season	League			National cup (Note: Includes DFB-Pokal, FA Cup)		League cup (Note: Includes EFL Cup)		Europe		Other		Total	
Club	Season	Division	Apps	Goals	Apps	Goals	Apps	Goals	Apps	Goals	Apps	Goals	Apps	Goals
VfL Bochum	2012–13	2. Bundesliga	32	4	4	0	—		—		—		36	4
Schalke 04	2013–14	Bundesliga	25	4	2	1	—		5 (Note: Appearance(s) in UEFA Champions League)	0	—		32	5
Schalke 04	2014–15	Bundesliga	10	0	0	0	—		1	0	—		11	0
Schalke 04	2015–16	Bundesliga	25	1	2	1	—		7 (Note: Appearances in UEFA Europa League)	0	—		34	2
Schalke 04	2016–17	Bundesliga	30	5	2	0	—		9	3	—		41	8
Schalke 04	2017–18	Bundesliga	26	4	3	0	—		—		—		29	4
Schalke 04	Total		116	14	9	2	—		22	3	—		147	19
Schalke 04 II	2014–15	Regionalliga West	1	0	—		—		—		—		1	0
Bayern Munich	2018–19	Bundesliga	30	8	5	1	—		6	0	1 (Note: Appearance in DFL-/Franz Beckenbauer Supercup)	0	42	9
Bayern Munich	2019–20	Bundesliga	24	6	5	1	—		8	1	1	0	38	8
Bayern Munich	2020–21	Bundesliga	24	5	0	0	—		7	2	1 (Note: Appearance in UEFA Super Cup)	1	32	8
Bayern Munich	2021–22	Bundesliga	19	3	1	0	—		6	0	1	0	27	3
Bayern Munich	2022–23	Bundesliga	27	3	4	1	—		8	2	0	0	39	6
Bayern Munich	2023–24	Bundesliga	30	6	1	0	—		10	0	1	0	42	6
Bayern Munich	2024–25	Bundesliga	26	4	2	0	—		12	1	3 (Note: Appearances in FIFA Club World Cup)	1	43	6
Bayern Munich	2025–26	Bundesliga	31	5	6	0	—		10	0	1	0	48	5
Bayern Munich	Total		211	40	24	3	—		68	6	9	2	312	51
Aston Villa	2026–27	Premier League	5	1	0	0	1	0	3	0	—		9	1
Career total			365	59	37	5	1	0	93	9	9	2	568	75

=== International ===
As of match played 29 June 2026

Appearances and goals by national team and year
National team	Year	Apps	Goals
Germany	2014	1	0
Germany	2015	0	0
Germany	2016	2	0
Germany	2017	9	6
Germany	2018	7	0
Germany	2019	6	5
Germany	2020	4	1
Germany	2021	12	2
Germany	2022	7	0
Germany	2023	9	0
Germany	2024	0	0
Germany	2025	10	1
Germany	2026	6	0
Total		73	15

As of match played 20 March 2025. Germany score listed first, score column indicates score after each Goretzka goal.

List of international goals scored by Leon Goretzka
No.	Date	Venue	Opponent	Score	Result	Competition
1	19 June 2017	Fisht Olympic Stadium, Sochi, Russia	Australia	3–1	3–2	2017 FIFA Confederations Cup
2	29 June 2017	Fisht Olympic Stadium, Sochi, Russia	Mexico	1–0	4–1	2017 FIFA Confederations Cup
3	29 June 2017	Fisht Olympic Stadium, Sochi, Russia	Mexico	2–0	4–1	2017 FIFA Confederations Cup
4	4 September 2017	Mercedes-Benz Arena, Stuttgart, Germany	Norway	5–0	6–0	2018 FIFA World Cup qualification
5	8 October 2017	Fritz-Walter-Stadion, Kaiserslautern, Germany	Azerbaijan	1–0	5–1	2018 FIFA World Cup qualification
6	8 October 2017	Fritz-Walter-Stadion, Kaiserslautern, Germany	Azerbaijan	4–1	5–1	2018 FIFA World Cup qualification
7	20 March 2019	Volkswagen Arena, Wolfsburg, Germany	Serbia	1–1	1–1	Friendly
8	11 June 2019	Opel Arena, Mainz, Germany	Estonia	3–0	8–0	UEFA Euro 2020 qualifying
9	16 November 2019	Borussia-Park, Mönchengladbach, Germany	Belarus	2–0	4–0	UEFA Euro 2020 qualifying
10	19 November 2019	Waldstadion, Frankfurt, Germany	Northern Ireland	2–1	6–1	UEFA Euro 2020 qualifying
11	19 November 2019	Waldstadion, Frankfurt, Germany	Northern Ireland	5–1	6–1	UEFA Euro 2020 qualifying
12	10 October 2020	NSC Olimpiyskiy Stadium, Kyiv, Ukraine	Ukraine	2–0	2–1	2020–21 UEFA Nations League A
13	25 March 2021	MSV-Arena, Duisburg, Germany	Iceland	1–0	3–0	2022 FIFA World Cup qualification
14	23 June 2021	Allianz Arena, Munich, Germany	Hungary	2–2	2–2	UEFA Euro 2020
15	20 March 2025	San Siro, Milan, Italy	Italy	2–1	2–1	2024–25 UEFA Nations League A

== Honours ==
Bayern Munich

- Bundesliga: 2018–19, 2019–20, 2020–21, 2021–22, 2022–23, 2024–25, 2025–26
- DFB-Pokal: 2018–19, 2019–20, 2025–26
- DFL/Franz Beckenbauer Supercup: 2018, 2020, 2021, 2025
- UEFA Champions League: 2019–20
- UEFA Super Cup: 2020
- FIFA Club World Cup: 2020

Germany U17

- UEFA European Under-17 Championship runner-up: 2012

Germany U23

- Olympic Silver Medal: 2016

Germany

- FIFA Confederations Cup: 2017

Individual

- Fritz Walter Medal U17 Gold: 2012
- FIFA Confederations Cup Silver Boot: 2017
- FIFA Confederations Cup Bronze Ball: 2017
- UEFA Champions League Squad of the Season: 2019–20
- Bundesliga Team of the Season: 2017–18, 2020–21
- kicker Bundesliga Team of the Season: 2020–21
- VDV Bundesliga Team of the Season: 2020–21
