= Markus Heppke =

German footballer (born 1986)

Personal information
- Full name: Markus Heppke
- Date of birth: 11 April 1986 (age 40)
- Place of birth: Essen, West Germany
- Height: 1.80 m (5 ft 11 in)
- Position: Midfielder

Team information
- Current team: SpVg Schonnebeck
- Number: 6

Youth career
- 1992–1999: Blau-Gelb Überruhr
- 1999–2005: Schalke 04

Senior career*
Years	Team	Apps	(Gls)
2005–2008	Schalke 04 II	67	(9)
2006–2008	Schalke 04	1	(0)
2009–2010	Rot-Weiß Oberhausen	36	(2)
2010–2011	Wuppertaler SV	34	(4)
2011–2014	Rot-Weiss Essen	77	(8)
2014–2016	SV Hönnepel-Niedermörmter	67	(5)
2016–	SpVg Schonnebeck	99	(8)

Managerial career
- 2016–: SpVg Schonnebeck (assistant)
- * Club domestic league appearances and goals as of 16 February 2021

Markus Heppke (born 11 April 1986) is a German former footballer who played as a midfielder for SpVg Schonnebeck.

== Career ==
He was 20 years old when he made his first appearance in the Bundesliga in an away game at Energie Cottbus on 18 November 2006. He was part of the Schalke Youth Team that won the Youth DFB-Pokal in 2005. On 1 January 2009, Heppke transferred to Rot-Weiß Oberhausen. In 2016 he transferred from SV Hönnepel-Niedermörmter to SV Schonnebeck and works as a physiotherapist at the Krupp-Krankenhaus.

== Early life ==
Heppke completed his abitur at the Gesamtschule Berger Feld.
