= Nabil Bentaleb =

Algerian footballer (born 1994)

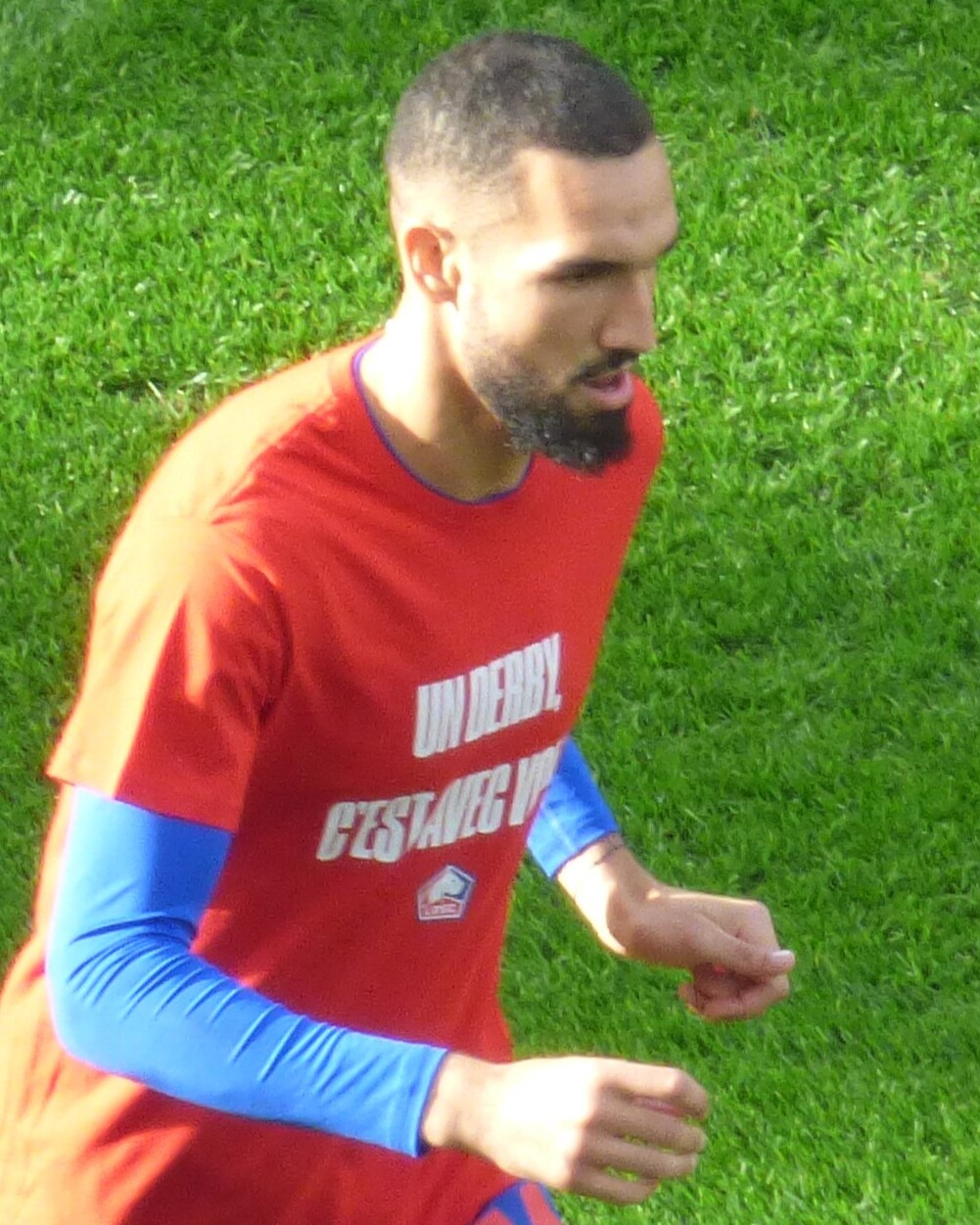
- Bentaleb with Lille in 2023

Personal information
- Full name: Nabil Bentaleb
- Date of birth: 24 November 1994 (age 31)
- Place of birth: Lille, France
- Height: 1.87 m (6 ft 2 in)
- Position: Defensive midfielder

Team information
- Current team: Lille
- Number: 6

Youth career
- 2001–2004: AJS Wazemmes
- 2004–2009: Lille
- 2009: Mouscron
- 2010–2012: Dunkerque
- 2012–2013: Tottenham Hotspur

Senior career*
Years	Team	Apps	(Gls)
2013–2017	Tottenham Hotspur	46	(0)
2016–2017	→ Schalke 04 (loan)	32	(5)
2017–2021	Schalke 04	50	(7)
2019	Schalke 04 II	2	(0)
2020	→ Newcastle United (loan)	12	(0)
2022–2023	Angers	48	(5)
2023–	Lille	71	(3)

International career^{‡}
2012	France U19	1	(0)
2014–	Algeria	64	(6)
- * Club domestic league appearances and goals as of 30 October 2026 ‡ National team caps and goals as of 2 July 2026

Nabil Bentaleb (Arabic: نَبِيل بْن طَالِب; born 24 November 1994) is a professional footballer who plays as a defensive midfielder for Ligue 1 club Lille. Born in France, he plays for the Algeria national team.

Bentaleb began his senior career with Tottenham Hotspur in 2013 and later played for Schalke 04, Newcastle United and Angers before joining his hometown club Lille in 2023. He made his senior international debut in March 2014 and represented Algeria at the FIFA World Cup in 2014 and 2026 and the Africa Cup of Nations in 2015, 2017 and 2023.

== Club career ==
=== Early career ===
Born in Lille to Algerian parents from Mostaganem, Bentaleb started his career at the academy of local side, Lille. However, he was released from the academy at the age of 15 and then went to Belgium to play for Mouscron. Bentaleb then went on trial with Birmingham City before eventually signing into the academy of Tottenham Hotspur in January 2012. During the 2012–13 season, Bentaleb broke into the under-21 side at Tottenham and scored four goals in fourteen matches, including the winning goal against Arsenal's Academy. His performance that season earned him a new four-year contract at Tottenham Hotspur until 2018.

=== Tottenham Hotspur ===
On 22 December 2013, Bentaleb was selected into the 18-man first-team squad for Tottenham Hotspur in a Premier League match against Southampton. He made his professional debut in that match when he came on as a substitute in the 50th minute for Mousa Dembélé, Tottenham won the match 3–2. His first start for Spurs came in the North London derby against Arsenal in the third round of the FA Cup on 4 January. Bentaleb scored his first goal for the club on 17 December 2014 in the fifth round of the Football League Cup against Newcastle United.

On 1 March 2015, Bentaleb started for Tottenham in the 2015 Football League Cup Final, a match they lost 2–0 to Chelsea. On 6 July, he signed a new five-year contract.

=== Schalke 04 ===
On 25 August 2016, Bentaleb joined Bundesliga side Schalke 04 on a season-long loan deal. He went on to make his debut in an away match against Frankfurt two days later, which Schalke lost 1–0. His first start came the next weekend against Bayern, after which Bentaleb became a fixture in new manager Markus Weinzierl's starting eleven. Enduring Schalke's worst ever start to a Bundesliga with five consecutive losses, Bentaleb confirmed his desire to remain in Gelsenkirchen, saying that "at Schalke they believe in me", while also appreciating the fans' ability to stick beside a team going through a rough patch in comparison to English fans.

On 15 October, Bentaleb came through with his first goal for Schalke, a strike from distance that put them temporarily ahead of Augsburg in a 1–1 draw. This was the first goal reviewed by goal-line technology in the Bundesliga to be successfully allowed. In Schalke's next match, he scored twice against Mainz in a 3–0 victory, becoming the first Algerian to achieve the feat in Bundesliga play. Immediately after the match, a report emerged claiming that Bentaleb had already signed a four-year contract to remain with Schalke, which would go in effect after a permanent buying option in his loan deal was picked up, putting his future at White Hart Lane in question.

On 24 February 2017, Tottenham Hotspur announced that they had reached an agreement with Schalke 04 for Bentaleb's transfer to be made permanent at the end of the loan period.

In March 2019 he was demoted to Schalke's under-23 team, "due to disciplinary reasons". He returned to the first-team in April 2019, before being dropped to the second team again later that month.

=== Newcastle United ===
On 21 January 2020, Bentaleb signed on loan with Newcastle United for the remainder of the 2019–20 Premier League season with the club having the option to make the deal permanent. Bentaleb made his debut in a 0–0 draw against Oxford United in the fourth round of the FA Cup. Bentaleb returned to Schalke at the end of the season after not impressing on loan.

=== Angers ===
On 6 January 2022, Bentaleb signed for French club Angers who play in Ligue 1, on a two-and-a-half-year contract.

=== Lille ===
On 28 August 2023, Bentaleb joined his hometown team Lille OSC on a three-year deal. In his first season at the French club, Bentaleb amassed 26 appearances as Lille finished fourth. However, after the season, in June 2024, Bentaleb suffered a cardiac arrest and was told his career might be over.

After over seven months out of action, Bentaleb was cleared to return to competitive football by the French Football Federation on 12 February 2025. He made his return to football on 16 February 2025, coming on as a 76th-minute substitute against Rennes. Bentaleb went on to score four minutes into his return, and celebrated by running to the Lille bench, where he was mobbed by his team-mates and coaching staff. Speaking about the goal, Lille boss Bruno Genesio proclaimed that the story behind it was "worthy of a film".

On 30 July 2026, Bentaleb signed a new contract with Lille until 2028.

== International career ==
On 14 November 2012, Bentaleb made his debut for France U19 in a friendly match, coming on as a half-time substitute in a 3–0 loss to Germany U19.

Despite having represented France, he was courted by the Algerian Football Federation, and accepted its offer. In January 2014, Tottenham Hotspur manager Tim Sherwood suggested that the English Football Association were also interested. However, Bentaleb would not meet the requirements to play for England under the unique rules set out in the Home Nations agreement. The Home Nations agreement requires that players engage in a minimum of five years of education before the age of 18 within the territory of the relevant association and does not offer national team eligibility through residency.

On 15 February 2014, Bentaleb pledged his international future to Algeria. A few days later, he was called up by Algeria coach Vahid Halilhodžić for a friendly match against Slovenia. He made his debut on 5 March, playing the full game in a 2–0 win over Slovenia. He scored his first goal for his country against Romania on 4 June 2014 at the Stade de Genève in Switzerland.

In June 2014, Bentaleb was named in Algeria's 23-man squad for the 2014 FIFA World Cup. He started in midfield for the team's opening match of the tournament – a 2–1 defeat by Belgium in Belo Horizonte on 17 June. He also played the full ninety minutes for Les Fennecs in their two other Group H matches; a 4–2 victory over South Korea and a 1–1 draw with Russia. However, he was an unused substitute during the team's 2–1 defeat to Germany in the round of 16. On 15 December 2014, Bentaleb was named in Algeria's 23-man squad for the 2015 Africa Cup of Nations in Equatorial Guinea.

In December 2023, he was named in Algeria's squad for the 2023 Africa Cup of Nations. On 31 May 2026, he was called up for the 2026 FIFA World Cup.

== Career statistics ==
=== Club ===
As of match played 30 October 2026

Appearances and goals by club, season and competition
Club	Season	League			National cup		League cup		Europe		Total	
Club	Season	Division	Apps	Goals	Apps	Goals	Apps	Goals	Apps	Goals	Apps	Goals
Tottenham Hotspur	2013–14	Premier League	15	0	1	0	0	0	4 (Note: Appearances in UEFA Europa League)	0	20	0
Tottenham Hotspur	2014–15	Premier League	26	0	0	0	3	1	6	0	35	1
Tottenham Hotspur	2015–16	Premier League	5	0	4	0	0	0	2	0	11	0
Tottenham Hotspur	Total		46	0	5	0	3	1	12	0	66	1
Schalke 04 (loan)	2016–17	Bundesliga	32	5	3	0	—		9	2	44	7
Schalke 04	2017–18	Bundesliga	16	4	3	0	—		—		19	4
Schalke 04	2018–19	Bundesliga	25	3	3	2	—		6 (Note: Appearances in UEFA Champions League)	3	34	8
Schalke 04	2019–20	Bundesliga	0	0	0	0	—		—		0	0
Schalke 04	2020–21	Bundesliga	9	0	1	0	—		—		10	0
Schalke 04	Schalke total		82	12	10	2	—		15	5	107	19
Newcastle United (loan)	2019–20	Premier League	12	0	3	0	—		—		15	0
Angers	2021–22	Ligue 1	18	1	0	0	—		—		18	1
Angers	2022–23	Ligue 1	30	4	3	0	—		—		33	4
Angers	Total		48	5	3	0	—		—		51	5
Lille	2023–24	Ligue 1	26	0	1	0	—		7 (Note: Appearances in UEFA Conference League)	0	34	0
Lille	2024–25	Ligue 1	10	1	0	0	—		0	0	10	1
Lille	2025–26	Ligue 1	26	2	2	0	—		9	0	37	2
Lille	2026–27	Ligue 1	9	0	0	0	—		3 (Note: Appearances in UEFA Champions League)	0	12	0
Lille	Total		71	3	3	0	—		19	0	93	3
Career total			259	20	24	2	3	1	46	5	332	28

=== International ===
As of match played 2 July 2026

Appearances and goals by national team and year
National team	Year	Apps	Goals
Algeria	2014	9	1
Algeria	2015	10	2
Algeria	2016	2	1
Algeria	2017	8	1
Algeria	2018	6	0
Algeria	2022	4	0
Algeria	2023	5	0
Algeria	2024	8	0
Algeria	2025	6	1
Algeria	2026	6	0
Total		64	6

Scores and results list Algeria's goal tally first, score column indicates score after each Bentaleb goal.

List of international goals scored by Nabil Bentaleb
No.	Date	Venue	Cap	Opponent	Score	Result	Competition
1	4 June 2014	Stade de Genève, Geneva, Switzerland	3	Romania	1–0	2–1	Friendly
2	27 January 2015	Estadio de Malabo, Malabo, Equatorial Guinea	13	Senegal	2–0	2–0	2015 Africa Cup of Nations
3	13 June 2015	Stade Mustapha Tchaker, Blida, Algeria	17	Seychelles	4–0	4–0	2017 Africa Cup of Nations qualification
4	12 November 2016	Godswill Akpabio International Stadium, Uyo, Nigeria	21	Nigeria	2–1	3–1	2018 FIFA World Cup qualification
5	7 January 2017	Stade Mustapha Tchaker, Blida, Algeria	22	Mauritania	3–1	3–1	Friendly
6	10 June 2025	Strawberry Arena, Solna, Sweden	54	Sweden	3–4	3–4	Friendly

== Honours ==
Tottenham Hotspur

- Football League Cup runner-up: 2014–15

Individual

- Bundesliga Goal of the Season: 2016–17 vs FC Augsburg on Matchday 7
