= Gesamtschule Berger Feld =

Location
- Adenauerallee 110; Gelsenkirchen; Germany
- Coordinates: 51.556609°N 7.071376°E

Information
- School type: Gesamtschule
- Established: 1969
- Schulleiter: Georg Altenkamp
- Teaching staff: c. 120
- Gender: Coeducational
- Enrollment: c. 1300
- Website: gesamtschule-berger-feld.de

Gesamtschule Berger Feld is a gesamtschule in Gelsenkirchen. It is located in the Erle region and has 1325 pupils and 118 teachers. It is known for the fact that a great number of its former students have become professional association football players.

== History ==
When the gesamtschule was introduced in North Rhine-Westphalia in 1969, the school was established as Gesamtschule Gelsenkirchen, and was the only one in North Rhine-Westphalia to start with grades 5 and 11, so that the first students took the abitur in 1972. It was accommodated in various buildings until 1974, when it moved to the newly built school building in Berger Feld in Adenauerallee, and it changed its name to the current one.

== Features ==
The school participates in the European Union's Comenius programme, organising school sports festivals for neighbouring primary schools.

As part of the 100.000 Watt-Solar-Initiative für Schulen in NRW, the school was equipped with a photovoltaic plant.

The school is located next to the grounds of FC Schalke 04, with whom it co-operates. Since 1995 it has the Talentzentrum Gelsenkirchen, and since 2000 the Fußballschule Auf Schalke/Teilinternat Gesamtschule Berger Feld. In June 2007, the school became the fourth German school to be awarded the title Eliteschule des Fußballs by the German Football Association.

== Notable alumni ==
Among the students of the partial boarding school who have later become professional footballers are Mesut Özil, Sead Kolašinac, Manuel Neuer, Julian Draxler, Joël Matip, Benedikt Höwedes, Alexander Baumjohann, Sebastian Boenisch, Tim Hoogland, Michael Delura, Ralf Fährmann and Alexandra Popp.
