= List of senior career goals by Cristiano Ronaldo =

This is a list of senior career goals by Cristiano Ronaldo.

== List of senior career goals ==
Scores and results list Cristiano Ronaldo's team's goal tally first.

Table key
Goals scored in finals
International goals

All senior career goals scored by Cristiano Ronaldo
No.	Date	Venue	Team	Opponent	Score	Result	Competition
1	7 October 2002	Estádio José Alvalade, Lisbon, Portugal	(Portugal) Sporting CP	(Portugal) Moreirense	2–0	3–0	Primeira Liga
2	7 October 2002	Estádio José Alvalade, Lisbon, Portugal	(Portugal) Sporting CP	(Portugal) Moreirense	3–0	3–0	Primeira Liga
3	26 October 2002	Estádio do Bessa, Porto, Portugal	(Portugal) Sporting CP	(Portugal) Boavista	2–1	2–1	Primeira Liga
4	24 November 2002	Estádio José Alvalade, Lisbon, Portugal	(Portugal) Sporting CP	(Portugal) Estarreja	3–0	4–1	Taça de Portugal
5	18 December 2002	Estádio José Alvalade, Lisbon, Portugal	(Portugal) Sporting CP	(Portugal) Oliveira do Hospital	3–0	8–1	Taça de Portugal
6	1 November 2003	Old Trafford, Manchester, England	(England) Manchester United	(England) Portsmouth	2–0	3–0	Premier League
7	14 February 2004	Old Trafford, Manchester, England	(England) Manchester United	(England) Manchester City	3–0	4–2	FA Cup
8	20 March 2004	Old Trafford, Manchester, England	(England) Manchester United	(England) Tottenham Hotspur	3–0	3–0	Premier League
9	10 April 2004	St. Andrew's, Birmingham, England	(England) Manchester United	(England) Birmingham City	1–1	2–1	Premier League
10	15 May 2004	Villa Park, Birmingham, England	(England) Manchester United	(England) Aston Villa	1–0	2–0	Premier League
11	22 May 2004	Millennium Stadium, Cardiff, Wales	(England) Manchester United	(England) Millwall	1–0	3–0	FA Cup
12	12 June 2004	Estádio do Dragão, Porto, Portugal	Portugal	Greece	1–2	1–2	UEFA Euro 2004
13	30 June 2004	Estádio José Alvalade, Lisbon, Portugal	Portugal	Netherlands	1–0	2–1	UEFA Euro 2004
14	4 September 2004	Skonto Stadium, Riga, Latvia	Portugal	Latvia	1–0	2–0	2006 FIFA World Cup qualification
15	8 September 2004	Estádio Dr. Magalhães Pessoa, Leiria, Portugal	Portugal	Estonia	1–0	4–0	2006 FIFA World Cup qualification
16	13 October 2004	Estádio José Alvalade, Lisbon, Portugal	Portugal	Russia	2–0	7–1	2006 FIFA World Cup qualification
17	13 October 2004	Estádio José Alvalade, Lisbon, Portugal	Portugal	Russia	4–0	7–1	2006 FIFA World Cup qualification
18	17 November 2004	Stade Josy Barthel, Luxembourg City, Luxembourg	Portugal	Luxembourg	2–0	5–0	2006 FIFA World Cup qualification
19	4 December 2004	Old Trafford, Manchester, England	(England) Manchester United	(England) Southampton	3–0	3–0	Premier League
20	19 January 2005	St James Park, Exeter, England	(England) Manchester United	(England) Exeter City	1–0	2–0	FA Cup
21	22 January 2005	Villa Park, Birmingham, England	(England) Manchester United	(England) Aston Villa	1–0	3–1	Premier League
22	1 February 2005	Highbury, London, England	(England) Manchester United	(England) Arsenal	2–2	4–2	Premier League
23	1 February 2005	Highbury, London, England	(England) Manchester United	(England) Arsenal	3–2	4–2	Premier League
24	19 February 2005	Goodison Park, Liverpool, England	(England) Manchester United	(England) Everton	2–0	2–0	FA Cup
25	12 March 2005	St Mary's Stadium, Southampton, England	(England) Manchester United	(England) Southampton	2–0	4–0	FA Cup
26	19 March 2005	Old Trafford, Manchester, England	(England) Manchester United	(England) Fulham	1–0	3–0	Premier League
27	17 April 2005	Millennium Stadium, Cardiff, Wales	(England) Manchester United	(England) Newcastle United	4–1	4–1	FA Cup
28	4 June 2005	Estádio da Luz, Lisbon, Portugal	Portugal	Slovakia	2–0	2–0	2006 FIFA World Cup qualification
29	8 June 2005	A. Le Coq Arena, Tallinn, Estonia	Portugal	Estonia	1–0	1–0	2006 FIFA World Cup qualification
30	9 August 2005	Old Trafford, Manchester, England	(England) Manchester United	(Hungary) Debrecen	3–0	3–0	UEFA Champions League qualifying
31	29 October 2005	Riverside Stadium, Middlesbrough, England	(England) Manchester United	(England) Middlesbrough	1–4	1–4	Premier League
32	30 November 2005	Old Trafford, Manchester, England	(England) Manchester United	(England) West Bromwich Albion	1–0	3–1	Football League Cup
33	31 December 2005	Old Trafford, Manchester, England	(England) Manchester United	(England) Bolton Wanderers	3–1	4–1	Premier League
34	31 December 2005	Old Trafford, Manchester, England	(England) Manchester United	(England) Bolton Wanderers	4–1	4–1	Premier League
35	4 February 2006	Old Trafford, Manchester, England	(England) Manchester United	(England) Fulham	2–0	4–2	Premier League
36	4 February 2006	Old Trafford, Manchester, England	(England) Manchester United	(England) Fulham	4–2	4–2	Premier League
37	11 February 2006	Fratton Park, Portsmouth, England	(England) Manchester United	(England) Portsmouth	2–0	3–1	Premier League
38	11 February 2006	Fratton Park, Portsmouth, England	(England) Manchester United	(England) Portsmouth	3–0	3–1	Premier League
39	26 February 2006	Millennium Stadium, Cardiff, Wales	(England) Manchester United	(England) Wigan Athletic	3–0	4–0	Football League Cup
40	1 March 2006	LTU Arena, Düsseldorf, Germany	Portugal	Saudi Arabia	1–0	3–0	International friendly
41	1 March 2006	LTU Arena, Düsseldorf, Germany	Portugal	Saudi Arabia	3–0	3–0	International friendly
42	6 March 2006	JJB Stadium, Wigan, England	(England) Manchester United	(England) Wigan Athletic	1–1	2–1	Premier League
43	7 May 2006	Old Trafford, Manchester, England	(England) Manchester United	(England) Charlton Athletic	2–0	4–0	Premier League
44	17 June 2006	Waldstadion, Frankfurt, Germany	Portugal	Iran	2–0	2–0	2006 FIFA World Cup
45	20 August 2006	Old Trafford, Manchester, England	(England) Manchester United	(England) Fulham	4–0	5–1	Premier League
46	23 September 2006	Madejski Stadium, Reading, England	(England) Manchester United	(England) Reading	1–1	1–1	Premier League
47	7 October 2006	Estádio do Bessa, Porto, Portugal	Portugal	Azerbaijan	1–0	3–0	UEFA Euro 2008 qualifying
48	7 October 2006	Estádio do Bessa, Porto, Portugal	Portugal	Azerbaijan	3–0	3–0	UEFA Euro 2008 qualifying
49	28 October 2006	Macron Stadium, Bolton, England	(England) Manchester United	(England) Bolton Wanderers	3–0	4–0	Premier League
50	4 November 2006	Old Trafford, Manchester, England	(England) Manchester United	(England) Portsmouth	2–0	3–0	Premier League
51	15 November 2006	Estádio Cidade de Coimbra, Coimbra, Portugal	Portugal	Kazakhstan	2–0	3–0	UEFA Euro 2008 qualifying
52	29 November 2006	Old Trafford, Manchester, England	(England) Manchester United	(England) Everton	1–0	3–0	Premier League
53	9 December 2006	Old Trafford, Manchester, England	(England) Manchester United	(England) Manchester City	3–1	3–1	Premier League
54	23 December 2006	Villa Park, Birmingham, England	(England) Manchester United	(England) Aston Villa	1–0	3–0	Premier League
55	23 December 2006	Villa Park, Birmingham, England	(England) Manchester United	(England) Aston Villa	3–0	3–0	Premier League
56	26 December 2006	Old Trafford, Manchester, England	(England) Manchester United	(England) Wigan Athletic	1–0	3–1	Premier League
57	26 December 2006	Old Trafford, Manchester, England	(England) Manchester United	(England) Wigan Athletic	2–0	3–1	Premier League
58	30 December 2006	Old Trafford, Manchester, England	(England) Manchester United	(England) Reading	2–1	3–2	Premier League
59	30 December 2006	Old Trafford, Manchester, England	(England) Manchester United	(England) Reading	3–1	3–2	Premier League
60	13 January 2007	Old Trafford, Manchester, England	(England) Manchester United	(England) Aston Villa	3–0	3–1	Premier League
61	31 January 2007	Old Trafford, Manchester, England	(England) Manchester United	(England) Watford	1–0	4–0	Premier League
62	4 February 2007	White Hart Lane, London, England	(England) Manchester United	(England) Tottenham Hotspur	1–0	4–0	Premier League
63	24 February 2007	Craven Cottage, London, England	(England) Manchester United	(England) Fulham	2–1	2–1	Premier League
64	10 March 2007	Riverside Stadium, Middlesbrough, England	(England) Manchester United	(England) Middlesbrough	2–2	2–2	FA Cup
65	19 March 2007	Old Trafford, Manchester, England	(England) Manchester United	(England) Middlesbrough	1–0	1–0	FA Cup
66	24 March 2007	Estádio José Alvalade, Lisbon, Portugal	Portugal	Belgium	2–0	4–0	UEFA Euro 2008 qualifying
67	24 March 2007	Estádio José Alvalade, Lisbon, Portugal	Portugal	Belgium	4–0	4–0	UEFA Euro 2008 qualifying
68	10 April 2007	Old Trafford, Manchester, England	(England) Manchester United	(Italy) Roma	4–0	7–1	UEFA Champions League
69	10 April 2007	Old Trafford, Manchester, England	(England) Manchester United	(Italy) Roma	5–0	7–1	UEFA Champions League
70	14 April 2007	Villa Park, Birmingham, England	(England) Manchester United	(England) Watford	2–1	4–1	FA Cup
71	24 April 2007	Old Trafford, Manchester, England	(England) Manchester United	(Italy) Milan	1–0	3–2	UEFA Champions League
72	5 May 2007	City of Manchester Stadium, Manchester, England	(England) Manchester United	(England) Manchester City	1–0	1–0	Premier League
73	22 August 2007	Hanrapetakan Stadium, Yerevan, Armenia	Portugal	Armenia	1–1	1–1	UEFA Euro 2008 qualifying
74	8 September 2007	Estádio da Luz, Lisbon, Portugal	Portugal	Poland	2–1	2–2	UEFA Euro 2008 qualifying
75	19 September 2007	Estádio José Alvalade, Lisbon, Portugal	(England) Manchester United	(Portugal) Sporting CP	1–0	1–0	UEFA Champions League
76	29 September 2007	St. Andrew's, Birmingham, England	(England) Manchester United	(England) Birmingham City	1–0	1–0	Premier League
77	6 October 2007	Old Trafford, Manchester, England	(England) Manchester United	(England) Wigan Athletic	2–0	4–0	Premier League
78	6 October 2007	Old Trafford, Manchester, England	(England) Manchester United	(England) Wigan Athletic	3–0	4–0	Premier League
79	17 October 2007	Almaty Central Stadium, Almaty, Kazakhstan	Portugal	Kazakhstan	2–0	2–1	UEFA Euro 2008 qualifying
80	23 October 2007	Olimpiyskiy National Sports Complex, Kyiv, Ukraine	(England) Manchester United	(Ukraine) Dynamo Kyiv	3–1	4–2	UEFA Champions League
81	23 October 2007	Olimpiyskiy National Sports Complex, Kyiv, Ukraine	(England) Manchester United	(Ukraine) Dynamo Kyiv	4–1	4–2	UEFA Champions League
82	3 November 2007	Emirates Stadium, London, England	(England) Manchester United	(England) Arsenal	2–1	2–2	Premier League
83	7 November 2007	Old Trafford, Manchester, England	(England) Manchester United	(Ukraine) Dynamo Kyiv	4–0	4–0	UEFA Champions League
84	11 November 2007	Old Trafford, Manchester, England	(England) Manchester United	(England) Blackburn Rovers	1–0	2–0	Premier League
85	11 November 2007	Old Trafford, Manchester, England	(England) Manchester United	(England) Blackburn Rovers	2–0	2–0	Premier League
86	27 November 2007	Old Trafford, Manchester, England	(England) Manchester United	(Portugal) Sporting CP	2–1	2–1	UEFA Champions League
87	3 December 2007	Old Trafford, Manchester, England	(England) Manchester United	(England) Fulham	1–0	2–0	Premier League
88	3 December 2007	Old Trafford, Manchester, England	(England) Manchester United	(England) Fulham	2–0	2–0	Premier League
89	8 December 2007	Old Trafford, Manchester, England	(England) Manchester United	(England) Derby County	4–1	4–1	Premier League
90	23 December 2007	Old Trafford, Manchester, England	(England) Manchester United	(England) Everton	1–0	2–1	Premier League
91	23 December 2007	Old Trafford, Manchester, England	(England) Manchester United	(England) Everton	2–1	2–1	Premier League
92	26 December 2007	Stadium of Light, Sunderland, England	(England) Manchester United	(England) Sunderland	3–0	4–0	Premier League
93	29 December 2007	Boleyn Ground, London, England	(England) Manchester United	(England) West Ham United	1–1	1–2	Premier League
94	5 January 2008	Villa Park, Birmingham, England	(England) Manchester United	(England) Aston Villa	1–0	2–0	FA Cup
95	12 January 2008	Old Trafford, Manchester, England	(England) Manchester United	(England) Newcastle United	1–0	6–0	Premier League
96	12 January 2008	Old Trafford, Manchester, England	(England) Manchester United	(England) Newcastle United	3–0	6–0	Premier League
97	12 January 2008	Old Trafford, Manchester, England	(England) Manchester United	(England) Newcastle United	5–0	6–0	Premier League
98	19 January 2008	Madejski Stadium, Reading, England	(England) Manchester United	(England) Reading	2–0	2–0	Premier League
99	27 January 2008	Old Trafford, Manchester, England	(England) Manchester United	(England) Tottenham Hotspur	2–1	3–1	FA Cup
100	27 January 2008	Old Trafford, Manchester, England	(England) Manchester United	(England) Tottenham Hotspur	3–1	3–1	FA Cup
101	30 January 2008	Old Trafford, Manchester, England	(England) Manchester United	(England) Portsmouth	1–0	2–0	Premier League
102	30 January 2008	Old Trafford, Manchester, England	(England) Manchester United	(England) Portsmouth	2–0	2–0	Premier League
103	23 February 2008	St James' Park, Newcastle, England	(England) Manchester United	(England) Newcastle United	2–0	5–1	Premier League
104	23 February 2008	St James' Park, Newcastle, England	(England) Manchester United	(England) Newcastle United	3–0	5–1	Premier League
105	4 March 2008	Old Trafford, Manchester, England	(England) Manchester United	(France) Lyon	1–0	1–0	UEFA Champions League
106	15 March 2008	Pride Park Stadium, Derby, England	(England) Manchester United	(England) Derby County	1–0	1–0	Premier League
107	19 March 2008	Old Trafford, Manchester, England	(England) Manchester United	(England) Bolton Wanderers	1–0	2–0	Premier League
108	19 March 2008	Old Trafford, Manchester, England	(England) Manchester United	(England) Bolton Wanderers	2–0	2–0	Premier League
109	23 March 2008	Old Trafford, Manchester, England	(England) Manchester United	(England) Liverpool	2–0	3–0	Premier League
110	29 March 2008	Old Trafford, Manchester, England	(England) Manchester United	(England) Aston Villa	1–0	4–0	Premier League
111	1 April 2008	Stadio Olimpico, Rome, Italy	(England) Manchester United	(Italy) Roma	1–0	2–0	UEFA Champions League
112	6 April 2008	Riverside Stadium, Middlesbrough, England	(England) Manchester United	(England) Middlesbrough	1–0	2–2	Premier League
113	13 April 2008	Old Trafford, Manchester, England	(England) Manchester United	(England) Arsenal	1–1	2–1	Premier League
114	3 May 2008	Old Trafford, Manchester, England	(England) Manchester United	(England) West Ham United	1–0	4–1	Premier League
115	3 May 2008	Old Trafford, Manchester, England	(England) Manchester United	(England) West Ham United	2–0	4–1	Premier League
116	11 May 2008	JJB Stadium, Wigan, England	(England) Manchester United	(England) Wigan Athletic	1–0	2–0	Premier League
117	21 May 2008	Luzhniki Stadium, Moscow, Russia	(England) Manchester United	(England) Chelsea	1–0	1–1 (a.e.t.) (6–5 p)	UEFA Champions League
118	11 June 2008	Stade de Genève, Geneva, Switzerland	Portugal	Czech Republic	2–1	3–1	UEFA Euro 2008
119	23 September 2008	Old Trafford, Manchester, England	(England) Manchester United	(England) Middlesbrough	1–0	3–1	Football League Cup
120	27 September 2008	Old Trafford, Manchester, England	(England) Manchester United	(England) Bolton Wanderers	1–0	2–0	Premier League
121	18 October 2008	Old Trafford, Manchester, England	(England) Manchester United	(England) West Bromwich Albion	2–0	4–0	Premier League
122	29 October 2008	Old Trafford, Manchester, England	(England) Manchester United	(England) West Ham United	1–0	2–0	Premier League
123	29 October 2008	Old Trafford, Manchester, England	(England) Manchester United	(England) West Ham United	2–0	2–0	Premier League
124	1 November 2008	Old Trafford, Manchester, England	(England) Manchester United	(England) Hull City	1–0	4–3	Premier League
125	1 November 2008	Old Trafford, Manchester, England	(England) Manchester United	(England) Hull City	3–1	4–3	Premier League
126	15 November 2008	Old Trafford, Manchester, England	(England) Manchester United	(England) Stoke City	1–0	5–0	Premier League
127	15 November 2008	Old Trafford, Manchester, England	(England) Manchester United	(England) Stoke City	5–0	5–0	Premier League
128	18 December 2008	Nissan Stadium, Yokohama, Japan	(England) Manchester United	(Japan) Gamba Osaka	2–0	5–3	FIFA Club World Cup
129	20 January 2009	Old Trafford, Manchester, England	(England) Manchester United	(England) Derby County	4–1	4–2	Football League Cup
130	27 January 2009	The Hawthorns, West Bromwich, England	(England) Manchester United	(England) West Bromwich Albion	4–0	5–0	Premier League
131	27 January 2009	The Hawthorns, West Bromwich, England	(England) Manchester United	(England) West Bromwich Albion	5–0	5–0	Premier League
132	31 January 2009	Old Trafford, Manchester, England	(England) Manchester United	(England) Everton	1–0	1–0	Premier League
133	11 February 2009	Estádio Algarve, Faro/Loulé, Portugal	Portugal	Finland	1–0	1–0	International friendly
134	15 February 2009	Pride Park Stadium, Derby, England	(England) Manchester United	(England) Derby County	3–1	4–1	FA Cup
135	21 February 2009	Old Trafford, Manchester, England	(England) Manchester United	(England) Blackburn Rovers	2–1	2–1	Premier League
136	11 March 2009	Old Trafford, Manchester, England	(England) Manchester United	(Italy) Internazionale	2–0	2–0	UEFA Champions League
137	14 March 2009	Old Trafford, Manchester, England	(England) Manchester United	(England) Liverpool	1–0	1–4	Premier League
138	5 April 2009	Old Trafford, Manchester, England	(England) Manchester United	(England) Aston Villa	1–0	3–2	Premier League
139	5 April 2009	Old Trafford, Manchester, England	(England) Manchester United	(England) Aston Villa	2–2	3–2	Premier League
140	15 April 2009	Estádio do Dragão, Porto, Portugal	(England) Manchester United	(Portugal) Porto	1–0	1–0	UEFA Champions League
141	25 April 2009	Old Trafford, Manchester, England	(England) Manchester United	(England) Tottenham Hotspur	1–2	5–2	Premier League
142	25 April 2009	Old Trafford, Manchester, England	(England) Manchester United	(England) Tottenham Hotspur	3–2	5–2	Premier League
143	5 May 2009	Emirates Stadium, London, England	(England) Manchester United	(England) Arsenal	2–0	3–1	UEFA Champions League
144	5 May 2009	Emirates Stadium, London, England	(England) Manchester United	(England) Arsenal	3–0	3–1	UEFA Champions League
145	10 May 2009	Old Trafford, Manchester, England	(England) Manchester United	(England) Manchester City	1–0	2–0	Premier League
146	29 August 2009	Santiago Bernabéu, Madrid, Spain	(Spain) Real Madrid	(Spain) Deportivo La Coruña	2–1	3–2	La Liga
147	12 September 2009	Cornellà-El Prat, Barcelona, Spain	(Spain) Real Madrid	(Spain) Espanyol	3–0	3–0	La Liga
148	15 September 2009	Letzigrund, Zurich, Switzerland	(Spain) Real Madrid	(Switzerland) Zürich	1–0	5–2	UEFA Champions League
149	15 September 2009	Letzigrund, Zurich, Switzerland	(Spain) Real Madrid	(Switzerland) Zürich	4–2	5–2	UEFA Champions League
150	20 September 2009	Santiago Bernabéu, Madrid, Spain	(Spain) Real Madrid	(Spain) Xerez	1–0	5–0	La Liga
151	20 September 2009	Santiago Bernabéu, Madrid, Spain	(Spain) Real Madrid	(Spain) Xerez	2–0	5–0	La Liga
152	23 September 2009	El Madrigal, Villarreal, Spain	(Spain) Real Madrid	(Spain) Villarreal	1–0	2–0	La Liga
153	30 September 2009	Santiago Bernabéu, Madrid, Spain	(Spain) Real Madrid	(France) Marseille	1–0	3–0	UEFA Champions League
154	30 September 2009	Santiago Bernabéu, Madrid, Spain	(Spain) Real Madrid	(France) Marseille	3–0	3–0	UEFA Champions League
155	5 December 2009	Santiago Bernabéu, Madrid, Spain	(Spain) Real Madrid	(Spain) Almería	4–2	4–2	La Liga
156	8 December 2009	Stade Vélodrome, Marseille, France	(Spain) Real Madrid	(France) Marseille	1–0	3–1	UEFA Champions League
157	8 December 2009	Stade Vélodrome, Marseille, France	(Spain) Real Madrid	(France) Marseille	3–1	3–1	UEFA Champions League
158	20 December 2009	Santiago Bernabéu, Madrid, Spain	(Spain) Real Madrid	(Spain) Zaragoza	5–0	6–0	La Liga
159	24 January 2010	Santiago Bernabéu, Madrid, Spain	(Spain) Real Madrid	(Spain) Málaga	1–0	2–0	La Liga
160	24 January 2010	Santiago Bernabéu, Madrid, Spain	(Spain) Real Madrid	(Spain) Málaga	2–0	2–0	La Liga
161	13 February 2010	Santiago Bernabéu, Madrid, Spain	(Spain) Real Madrid	(Spain) Xerez	2–0	3–0	La Liga
162	13 February 2010	Santiago Bernabéu, Madrid, Spain	(Spain) Real Madrid	(Spain) Xerez	3–0	3–0	La Liga
163	21 February 2010	Santiago Bernabéu, Madrid, Spain	(Spain) Real Madrid	(Spain) Villarreal	1–0	6–2	La Liga
164	27 February 2010	Estadio de Tenerife, Santa Cruz de Tenerife, Spain	(Spain) Real Madrid	(Spain) Tenerife	4–1	5–1	La Liga
165	6 March 2010	Santiago Bernabéu, Madrid, Spain	(Spain) Real Madrid	(Spain) Sevilla	1–2	3–2	La Liga
166	10 March 2010	Santiago Bernabéu, Madrid, Spain	(Spain) Real Madrid	(France) Lyon	1–0	1–1	UEFA Champions League
167	14 March 2010	José Zorilla, Valladolid, Spain	(Spain) Real Madrid	(Spain) Valladolid	1–0	4–1	La Liga
168	25 March 2010	Coliseum Alfonso Pérez, Getafe, Spain	(Spain) Real Madrid	(Spain) Getafe	1–0	4–2	La Liga
169	25 March 2010	Coliseum Alfonso Pérez, Getafe, Spain	(Spain) Real Madrid	(Spain) Getafe	4–1	4–2	La Liga
170	4 April 2010	El Sardinero, Santander, Spain	(Spain) Real Madrid	(Spain) Racing Santander	1–0	2–0	La Liga
171	15 April 2010	Estadio de los Juegos Mediterráneos, Almería, Spain	(Spain) Real Madrid	(Spain) Almería	1–1	2–1	La Liga
172	18 April 2010	Santiago Bernabéu, Madrid, Spain	(Spain) Real Madrid	(Spain) Valencia	2–0	2–0	La Liga
173	2 May 2010	Santiago Bernabéu, Madrid, Spain	(Spain) Real Madrid	(Spain) Osasuna	1–1	3–2	La Liga
174	2 May 2010	Santiago Bernabéu, Madrid, Spain	(Spain) Real Madrid	(Spain) Osasuna	3–2	3–2	La Liga
175	5 May 2010	Iberostar Estadi, Palma, Spain	(Spain) Real Madrid	(Spain) Mallorca	1–1	4–1	La Liga
176	5 May 2010	Iberostar Estadi, Palma, Spain	(Spain) Real Madrid	(Spain) Mallorca	2–1	4–1	La Liga
177	5 May 2010	Iberostar Estadi, Palma, Spain	(Spain) Real Madrid	(Spain) Mallorca	3–1	4–1	La Liga
178	8 May 2010	Santiago Bernabéu, Madrid, Spain	(Spain) Real Madrid	(Spain) Athletic Bilbao	1–0	5–1	La Liga
179	21 June 2010	Cape Town Stadium, Cape Town, South Africa	Portugal	North Korea	6–0	7–0	2010 FIFA World Cup
180	21 September 2010	Santiago Bernabéu, Madrid, Spain	(Spain) Real Madrid	(Spain) Espanyol	1–0	3–0	La Liga
181	2 October 2010	Santiago Bernabéu, Madrid, Spain	(Spain) Real Madrid	(Spain) Deportivo La Coruña	1–0	6–1	La Liga
182	2 October 2010	Santiago Bernabéu, Madrid, Spain	(Spain) Real Madrid	(Spain) Deportivo La Coruña	6–1	6–1	La Liga
183	8 October 2010	Estádio do Dragão, Porto, Portugal	Portugal	Denmark	3–1	3–1	UEFA Euro 2012 qualifying
184	12 October 2010	Laugardalsvöllur, Reykjavík, Iceland	Portugal	Iceland	1–0	3–1	UEFA Euro 2012 qualifying
185	16 October 2010	La Rosaleda, Málaga, Spain	(Spain) Real Madrid	(Spain) Málaga	2–0	4–1	La Liga
186	16 October 2010	La Rosaleda, Málaga, Spain	(Spain) Real Madrid	(Spain) Málaga	3–0	4–1	La Liga
187	19 October 2010	Santiago Bernabéu, Madrid, Spain	(Spain) Real Madrid	(Italy) Milan	1–0	2–0	UEFA Champions League
188	23 October 2010	Santiago Bernabéu, Madrid, Spain	(Spain) Real Madrid	(Spain) Racing Santander	2–0	6–1	La Liga
189	23 October 2010	Santiago Bernabéu, Madrid, Spain	(Spain) Real Madrid	(Spain) Racing Santander	3–0	6–1	La Liga
190	23 October 2010	Santiago Bernabéu, Madrid, Spain	(Spain) Real Madrid	(Spain) Racing Santander	4–0	6–1	La Liga
191	23 October 2010	Santiago Bernabéu, Madrid, Spain	(Spain) Real Madrid	(Spain) Racing Santander	5–0	6–1	La Liga
192	30 October 2010	José Rico Pérez, Alicante, Spain	(Spain) Real Madrid	(Spain) Hércules	2–1	3–1	La Liga
193	30 October 2010	José Rico Pérez, Alicante, Spain	(Spain) Real Madrid	(Spain) Hércules	3–1	3–1	La Liga
194	10 November 2010	Santiago Bernabéu, Madrid, Spain	(Spain) Real Madrid	(Spain) Murcia	3–0	5–1	Copa del Rey
195	20 November 2010	Santiago Bernabéu, Madrid, Spain	(Spain) Real Madrid	(Spain) Athletic Bilbao	2–0	5–1	La Liga
196	20 November 2010	Santiago Bernabéu, Madrid, Spain	(Spain) Real Madrid	(Spain) Athletic Bilbao	4–1	5–1	La Liga
197	20 November 2010	Santiago Bernabéu, Madrid, Spain	(Spain) Real Madrid	(Spain) Athletic Bilbao	5–1	5–1	La Liga
198	23 November 2010	Amsterdam Arena, Amsterdam, Netherlands	(Spain) Real Madrid	(Netherlands) Ajax	3–0	4–0	UEFA Champions League
199	23 November 2010	Amsterdam Arena, Amsterdam, Netherlands	(Spain) Real Madrid	(Netherlands) Ajax	4–0	4–0	UEFA Champions League
200	4 December 2010	Santiago Bernabéu, Madrid, Spain	(Spain) Real Madrid	(Spain) Valencia	1–0	2–0	La Liga
201	4 December 2010	Santiago Bernabéu, Madrid, Spain	(Spain) Real Madrid	(Spain) Valencia	2–0	2–0	La Liga
202	8 December 2010	Santiago Bernabéu, Madrid, Spain	(Spain) Real Madrid	(France) Auxerre	2–0	4–0	UEFA Champions League
203	12 December 2010	La Romareda, Zaragoza, Spain	(Spain) Real Madrid	(Spain) Zaragoza	2–1	3–1	La Liga
204	22 December 2010	Santiago Bernabéu, Madrid, Spain	(Spain) Real Madrid	(Spain) Levante	4–0	8–0	Copa del Rey
205	22 December 2010	Santiago Bernabéu, Madrid, Spain	(Spain) Real Madrid	(Spain) Levante	6–0	8–0	Copa del Rey
206	22 December 2010	Santiago Bernabéu, Madrid, Spain	(Spain) Real Madrid	(Spain) Levante	7–0	8–0	Copa del Rey
207	3 January 2011	Coliseum Alfonso Pérez, Getafe, Spain	(Spain) Real Madrid	(Spain) Getafe	1–0	3–2	La Liga
208	3 January 2011	Coliseum Alfonso Pérez, Getafe, Spain	(Spain) Real Madrid	(Spain) Getafe	3–1	3–2	La Liga
209	8 January 2011	Santiago Bernabéu, Madrid, Spain	(Spain) Real Madrid	(Spain) Villarreal	1–1	4–2	La Liga
210	8 January 2011	Santiago Bernabéu, Madrid, Spain	(Spain) Real Madrid	(Spain) Villarreal	2–2	4–2	La Liga
211	8 January 2011	Santiago Bernabéu, Madrid, Spain	(Spain) Real Madrid	(Spain) Villarreal	3–2	4–2	La Liga
212	13 January 2011	Santiago Bernabéu, Madrid, Spain	(Spain) Real Madrid	(Spain) Atlético Madrid	2–1	3–1	Copa del Rey
213	20 January 2011	Vicente Calderón, Madrid, Spain	(Spain) Real Madrid	(Spain) Atlético Madrid	1–0	1–0	Copa del Rey
214	6 February 2011	Santiago Bernabéu, Madrid, Spain	(Spain) Real Madrid	(Spain) Real Sociedad	2–0	4–1	La Liga
215	6 February 2011	Santiago Bernabéu, Madrid, Spain	(Spain) Real Madrid	(Spain) Real Sociedad	3–0	4–1	La Liga
216	9 February 2011	Stade de Genève, Geneva, Switzerland	Portugal	Argentina	1–1	1–2	International friendly
217	3 March 2011	Santiago Bernabéu, Madrid, Spain	(Spain) Real Madrid	(Spain) Málaga	4–0	7–0	La Liga
218	3 March 2011	Santiago Bernabéu, Madrid, Spain	(Spain) Real Madrid	(Spain) Málaga	6–0	7–0	La Liga
219	3 March 2011	Santiago Bernabéu, Madrid, Spain	(Spain) Real Madrid	(Spain) Málaga	7–0	7–0	La Liga
220	5 April 2011	Santiago Bernabéu, Madrid, Spain	(Spain) Real Madrid	(England) Tottenham Hotspur	4–0	4–0	UEFA Champions League
221	9 April 2011	San Mamés, Bilbao, Spain	(Spain) Real Madrid	(Spain) Athletic Bilbao	3–0	3–0	La Liga
222	13 April 2011	White Hart Lane, London, England	(Spain) Real Madrid	(England) Tottenham Hotspur	1–0	1–0	UEFA Champions League
223	16 April 2011	Santiago Bernabéu, Madrid, Spain	(Spain) Real Madrid	(Spain) Barcelona	1–1	1–1	La Liga
224	20 April 2011	Mestalla, Valencia, Spain	(Spain) Real Madrid	(Spain) Barcelona	1–0	1–0	Copa del Rey
225	7 May 2011	Ramón Sánchez Pizjuán, Seville, Spain	(Spain) Real Madrid	(Spain) Sevilla	2–0	6–2	La Liga
226	7 May 2011	Ramón Sánchez Pizjuán, Seville, Spain	(Spain) Real Madrid	(Spain) Sevilla	4–1	6–2	La Liga
227	7 May 2011	Ramón Sánchez Pizjuán, Seville, Spain	(Spain) Real Madrid	(Spain) Sevilla	5–1	6–2	La Liga
228	7 May 2011	Ramón Sánchez Pizjuán, Seville, Spain	(Spain) Real Madrid	(Spain) Sevilla	6–1	6–2	La Liga
229	10 May 2011	Santiago Bernabéu, Madrid, Spain	(Spain) Real Madrid	(Spain) Getafe	1–0	4–0	La Liga
230	10 May 2011	Santiago Bernabéu, Madrid, Spain	(Spain) Real Madrid	(Spain) Getafe	2–0	4–0	La Liga
231	10 May 2011	Santiago Bernabéu, Madrid, Spain	(Spain) Real Madrid	(Spain) Getafe	4–0	4–0	La Liga
232	15 May 2011	El Madrigal, Villarreal, Spain	(Spain) Real Madrid	(Spain) Villarreal	2–0	3–1	La Liga
233	15 May 2011	El Madrigal, Villarreal, Spain	(Spain) Real Madrid	(Spain) Villarreal	3–1	3–1	La Liga
234	21 May 2011	Santiago Bernabéu, Madrid, Spain	(Spain) Real Madrid	(Spain) Almería	1–0	8–1	La Liga
235	21 May 2011	Santiago Bernabéu, Madrid, Spain	(Spain) Real Madrid	(Spain) Almería	7–1	8–1	La Liga
236	10 August 2011	Estádio Algarve, Faro/Loulé, Portugal	Portugal	Luxembourg	2–0	5–0	International friendly
237	17 August 2011	Camp Nou, Barcelona, Spain	(Spain) Real Madrid	(Spain) Barcelona	1–1	2–3	Supercopa de España
238	28 August 2011	La Romareda, Zaragoza, Spain	(Spain) Real Madrid	(Spain) Zaragoza	1–0	6–0	La Liga
239	28 August 2011	La Romareda, Zaragoza, Spain	(Spain) Real Madrid	(Spain) Zaragoza	4–0	6–0	La Liga
240	28 August 2011	La Romareda, Zaragoza, Spain	(Spain) Real Madrid	(Spain) Zaragoza	6–0	6–0	La Liga
241	2 September 2011	GSP Stadium, Nicosia, Cyprus	Portugal	Cyprus	1–0	4–0	UEFA Euro 2012 qualifying
242	2 September 2011	GSP Stadium, Nicosia, Cyprus	Portugal	Cyprus	2–0	4–0	UEFA Euro 2012 qualifying
243	10 September 2011	Santiago Bernabéu, Madrid, Spain	(Spain) Real Madrid	(Spain) Getafe	2–1	4–2	La Liga
244	24 September 2011	Santiago Bernabéu, Madrid, Spain	(Spain) Real Madrid	(Spain) Rayo Vallecano	1–1	6–2	La Liga
245	24 September 2011	Santiago Bernabéu, Madrid, Spain	(Spain) Real Madrid	(Spain) Rayo Vallecano	3–1	6–2	La Liga
246	24 September 2011	Santiago Bernabéu, Madrid, Spain	(Spain) Real Madrid	(Spain) Rayo Vallecano	6–2	6–2	La Liga
247	27 September 2011	Santiago Bernabéu, Madrid, Spain	(Spain) Real Madrid	(Netherlands) Ajax	1–0	3–0	UEFA Champions League
248	11 October 2011	Parken Stadium, Copenhagen, Denmark	Portugal	Denmark	1–2	1–2	UEFA Euro 2012 qualifying
249	22 October 2011	La Rosaleda, Málaga, Spain	(Spain) Real Madrid	(Spain) Málaga	2–0	4–0	La Liga
250	22 October 2011	La Rosaleda, Málaga, Spain	(Spain) Real Madrid	(Spain) Málaga	3–0	4–0	La Liga
251	22 October 2011	La Rosaleda, Málaga, Spain	(Spain) Real Madrid	(Spain) Málaga	4–0	4–0	La Liga
252	2 November 2011	Stade de Gerland, Lyon, France	(Spain) Real Madrid	(France) Lyon	1–0	2–0	UEFA Champions League
253	2 November 2011	Stade de Gerland, Lyon, France	(Spain) Real Madrid	(France) Lyon	2–0	2–0	UEFA Champions League
254	6 November 2011	Santiago Bernabéu, Madrid, Spain	(Spain) Real Madrid	(Spain) Osasuna	1–0	7–1	La Liga
255	6 November 2011	Santiago Bernabéu, Madrid, Spain	(Spain) Real Madrid	(Spain) Osasuna	4–1	7–1	La Liga
256	6 November 2011	Santiago Bernabéu, Madrid, Spain	(Spain) Real Madrid	(Spain) Osasuna	5–1	7–1	La Liga
257	15 November 2011	Estádio da Luz, Lisbon, Portugal	Portugal	Bosnia and Herzegovina	1–0	6–2	UEFA Euro 2012 qualifying
258	15 November 2011	Estádio da Luz, Lisbon, Portugal	Portugal	Bosnia and Herzegovina	3–1	6–2	UEFA Euro 2012 qualifying
259	19 November 2011	Mestalla, Valencia, Spain	(Spain) Real Madrid	(Spain) Valencia	3–1	3–2	La Liga
260	26 November 2011	Santiago Bernabéu, Madrid, Spain	(Spain) Real Madrid	(Spain) Atlético Madrid	1–1	4–1	La Liga
261	26 November 2011	Santiago Bernabéu, Madrid, Spain	(Spain) Real Madrid	(Spain) Atlético Madrid	4–1	4–1	La Liga
262	3 December 2011	El Molinón, Gijón, Spain	(Spain) Real Madrid	(Spain) Sporting Gijón	2–0	3–0	La Liga
263	13 December 2011	El Toralín, Ponferrada, Spain	(Spain) Real Madrid	(Spain) Ponferradina	2–0	2–0	Copa del Rey
264	17 December 2011	Ramón Sánchez Pizjuán, Seville, Spain	(Spain) Real Madrid	(Spain) Sevilla	1–0	6–2	La Liga
265	17 December 2011	Ramón Sánchez Pizjuán, Seville, Spain	(Spain) Real Madrid	(Spain) Sevilla	3–0	6–2	La Liga
266	17 December 2011	Ramón Sánchez Pizjuán, Seville, Spain	(Spain) Real Madrid	(Spain) Sevilla	5–1	6–2	La Liga
267	7 January 2012	Santiago Bernabéu, Madrid, Spain	(Spain) Real Madrid	(Spain) Granada	5–1	5–1	La Liga
268	18 January 2012	Santiago Bernabéu, Madrid, Spain	(Spain) Real Madrid	(Spain) Barcelona	1–0	1–2	Copa del Rey
269	22 January 2012	Santiago Bernabéu, Madrid, Spain	(Spain) Real Madrid	(Spain) Athletic Bilbao	2–1	4–1	La Liga
270	22 January 2012	Santiago Bernabéu, Madrid, Spain	(Spain) Real Madrid	(Spain) Athletic Bilbao	3–1	4–1	La Liga
271	25 January 2012	Camp Nou, Barcelona, Spain	(Spain) Real Madrid	(Spain) Barcelona	1–2	2–2	Copa del Rey
272	28 January 2012	Santiago Bernabéu, Madrid, Spain	(Spain) Real Madrid	(Spain) Zaragoza	2–1	3–1	La Liga
273	12 February 2012	Santiago Bernabéu, Madrid, Spain	(Spain) Real Madrid	(Spain) Levante	1–1	4–2	La Liga
274	12 February 2012	Santiago Bernabéu, Madrid, Spain	(Spain) Real Madrid	(Spain) Levante	2–1	4–2	La Liga
275	12 February 2012	Santiago Bernabéu, Madrid, Spain	(Spain) Real Madrid	(Spain) Levante	3–1	4–2	La Liga
276	18 February 2012	Santiago Bernabéu, Madrid, Spain	(Spain) Real Madrid	(Spain) Racing Santander	1–0	4–0	La Liga
277	21 February 2012	Luzhniki Stadium, Moscow, Russia	(Spain) Real Madrid	(Russia) CSKA Moscow	1–0	1–1	UEFA Champions League
278	26 February 2012	Vallecas, Madrid, Spain	(Spain) Real Madrid	(Spain) Rayo Vallecano	1–0	1–0	La Liga
279	4 March 2012	Santiago Bernabéu, Madrid, Spain	(Spain) Real Madrid	(Spain) Espanyol	1–0	5–0	La Liga
280	10 March 2012	Benito Villamarín, Seville, Spain	(Spain) Real Madrid	(Spain) Real Betis	2–1	3–2	La Liga
281	10 March 2012	Benito Villamarín, Seville, Spain	(Spain) Real Madrid	(Spain) Real Betis	3–2	3–2	La Liga
282	14 March 2012	Santiago Bernabéu, Madrid, Spain	(Spain) Real Madrid	(Russia) CSKA Moscow	2–0	4–1	UEFA Champions League
283	14 March 2012	Santiago Bernabéu, Madrid, Spain	(Spain) Real Madrid	(Russia) CSKA Moscow	4–1	4–1	UEFA Champions League
284	21 March 2012	El Madrigal, Villarreal, Spain	(Spain) Real Madrid	(Spain) Villarreal	1–0	1–1	La Liga
285	24 March 2012	Santiago Bernabéu, Madrid, Spain	(Spain) Real Madrid	(Spain) Real Sociedad	2–0	5–1	La Liga
286	24 March 2012	Santiago Bernabéu, Madrid, Spain	(Spain) Real Madrid	(Spain) Real Sociedad	5–1	5–1	La Liga
287	31 March 2012	El Sadar, Pamplona, Spain	(Spain) Real Madrid	(Spain) Osasuna	2–0	5–1	La Liga
288	31 March 2012	El Sadar, Pamplona, Spain	(Spain) Real Madrid	(Spain) Osasuna	4–1	5–1	La Liga
289	4 April 2012	Santiago Bernabéu, Madrid, Spain	(Spain) Real Madrid	(Cyprus) APOEL	1–0	5–2	UEFA Champions League
290	4 April 2012	Santiago Bernabéu, Madrid, Spain	(Spain) Real Madrid	(Cyprus) APOEL	3–1	5–2	UEFA Champions League
291	11 April 2012	Vicente Calderón, Madrid, Spain	(Spain) Real Madrid	(Spain) Atlético Madrid	1–0	4–1	La Liga
292	11 April 2012	Vicente Calderón, Madrid, Spain	(Spain) Real Madrid	(Spain) Atlético Madrid	2–1	4–1	La Liga
293	11 April 2012	Vicente Calderón, Madrid, Spain	(Spain) Real Madrid	(Spain) Atlético Madrid	3–1	4–1	La Liga
294	14 April 2012	Santiago Bernabéu, Madrid, Spain	(Spain) Real Madrid	(Spain) Sporting Gijón	2–1	3–1	La Liga
295	21 April 2012	Camp Nou, Barcelona, Spain	(Spain) Real Madrid	(Spain) Barcelona	2–1	2–1	La Liga
296	25 April 2012	Santiago Bernabéu, Madrid, Spain	(Spain) Real Madrid	(Germany) Bayern Munich	1–0	2–1	UEFA Champions League
297	25 April 2012	Santiago Bernabéu, Madrid, Spain	(Spain) Real Madrid	(Germany) Bayern Munich	2–0	2–1	UEFA Champions League
298	29 April 2012	Santiago Bernabéu, Madrid, Spain	(Spain) Real Madrid	(Spain) Sevilla	1–0	3–0	La Liga
299	2 May 2012	San Mamés, Bilbao, Spain	(Spain) Real Madrid	(Spain) Athletic Bilbao	3–0	3–0	La Liga
300	5 May 2012	Los Cármenes, Granada, Spain	(Spain) Real Madrid	(Spain) Granada	1–1	2–1	La Liga
301	13 May 2012	Santiago Bernabéu, Madrid, Spain	(Spain) Real Madrid	(Spain) Mallorca	1–0	4–1	La Liga
302	17 June 2012	Metalist Stadium, Kharkiv, Ukraine	Portugal	Netherlands	1–1	2–1	UEFA Euro 2012
303	17 June 2012	Metalist Stadium, Kharkiv, Ukraine	Portugal	Netherlands	2–1	2–1	UEFA Euro 2012
304	21 June 2012	National Stadium, Warsaw, Poland	Portugal	Czech Republic	1–0	1–0	UEFA Euro 2012
305	15 August 2012	Estádio Algarve, Faro/Loulé, Portugal	Portugal	Panama	2–0	2–0	International friendly
306	23 August 2012	Camp Nou, Barcelona, Spain	(Spain) Real Madrid	(Spain) Barcelona	1–0	2–3	Supercopa de España
307	29 August 2012	Santiago Bernabéu, Madrid, Spain	(Spain) Real Madrid	(Spain) Barcelona	2–0	2–1	Supercopa de España
308	2 September 2012	Santiago Bernabéu, Madrid, Spain	(Spain) Real Madrid	(Spain) Granada	1–0	3–0	La Liga
309	2 September 2012	Santiago Bernabéu, Madrid, Spain	(Spain) Real Madrid	(Spain) Granada	2–0	3–0	La Liga
310	7 September 2012	Stade Josy Barthel, Luxembourg City, Luxembourg	Portugal	Luxembourg	1–1	2–1	2014 FIFA World Cup qualification
311	18 September 2012	Santiago Bernabéu, Madrid, Spain	(Spain) Real Madrid	(England) Manchester City	3–2	3–2	UEFA Champions League
312	24 September 2012	Vallecas, Madrid, Spain	(Spain) Real Madrid	(Spain) Rayo Vallecano	2–0	2–0	La Liga
313	30 September 2012	Santiago Bernabéu, Madrid, Spain	(Spain) Real Madrid	(Spain) Deportivo La Coruña	1–1	5–1	La Liga
314	30 September 2012	Santiago Bernabéu, Madrid, Spain	(Spain) Real Madrid	(Spain) Deportivo La Coruña	3–1	5–1	La Liga
315	30 September 2012	Santiago Bernabéu, Madrid, Spain	(Spain) Real Madrid	(Spain) Deportivo La Coruña	5–1	5–1	La Liga
316	3 October 2012	Amsterdam Arena, Amsterdam, Netherlands	(Spain) Real Madrid	(Netherlands) Ajax	1–0	4–1	UEFA Champions League
317	3 October 2012	Amsterdam Arena, Amsterdam, Netherlands	(Spain) Real Madrid	(Netherlands) Ajax	3–1	4–1	UEFA Champions League
318	3 October 2012	Amsterdam Arena, Amsterdam, Netherlands	(Spain) Real Madrid	(Netherlands) Ajax	4–1	4–1	UEFA Champions League
319	7 October 2012	Camp Nou, Barcelona, Spain	(Spain) Real Madrid	(Spain) Barcelona	1–0	2–2	La Liga
320	7 October 2012	Camp Nou, Barcelona, Spain	(Spain) Real Madrid	(Spain) Barcelona	2–2	2–2	La Liga
321	20 October 2012	Santiago Bernabéu, Madrid, Spain	(Spain) Real Madrid	(Spain) Celta Vigo	2–0	2–0	La Liga
322	24 October 2012	Westfalenstadion, Dortmund, Germany	(Spain) Real Madrid	(Germany) Borussia Dortmund	1–1	1–2	UEFA Champions League
323	28 October 2012	Iberostar Estadi, Palma, Spain	(Spain) Real Madrid	(Spain) Mallorca	2–0	5–0	La Liga
324	28 October 2012	Iberostar Estadi, Palma, Spain	(Spain) Real Madrid	(Spain) Mallorca	4–0	5–0	La Liga
325	11 November 2012	Ciutat de València, Valencia, Spain	(Spain) Real Madrid	(Spain) Levante	1–0	2–1	La Liga
326	1 December 2012	Santiago Bernabéu, Madrid, Spain	(Spain) Real Madrid	(Spain) Atlético Madrid	1–0	2–0	La Liga
327	4 December 2012	Santiago Bernabéu, Madrid, Spain	(Spain) Real Madrid	(Netherlands) Ajax	1–0	4–1	UEFA Champions League
328	12 December 2012	Balaídos, Vigo, Spain	(Spain) Real Madrid	(Spain) Celta Vigo	1–2	1–2	Copa del Rey
329	16 December 2012	Santiago Bernabéu, Madrid, Spain	(Spain) Real Madrid	(Spain) Espanyol	1–1	2–2	La Liga
330	6 January 2013	Santiago Bernabéu, Madrid, Spain	(Spain) Real Madrid	(Spain) Real Sociedad	3–2	4–3	La Liga
331	6 January 2013	Santiago Bernabéu, Madrid, Spain	(Spain) Real Madrid	(Spain) Real Sociedad	4–2	4–3	La Liga
332	9 January 2013	Santiago Bernabéu, Madrid, Spain	(Spain) Real Madrid	(Spain) Celta Vigo	1–0	4–0	Copa del Rey
333	9 January 2013	Santiago Bernabéu, Madrid, Spain	(Spain) Real Madrid	(Spain) Celta Vigo	2–0	4–0	Copa del Rey
334	9 January 2013	Santiago Bernabéu, Madrid, Spain	(Spain) Real Madrid	(Spain) Celta Vigo	3–0	4–0	Copa del Rey
335	20 January 2013	Mestalla, Valencia, Spain	(Spain) Real Madrid	(Spain) Valencia	3–0	5–0	La Liga
336	20 January 2013	Mestalla, Valencia, Spain	(Spain) Real Madrid	(Spain) Valencia	4–0	5–0	La Liga
337	27 January 2013	Santiago Bernabéu, Madrid, Spain	(Spain) Real Madrid	(Spain) Getafe	2–0	4–0	La Liga
338	27 January 2013	Santiago Bernabéu, Madrid, Spain	(Spain) Real Madrid	(Spain) Getafe	3–0	4–0	La Liga
339	27 January 2013	Santiago Bernabéu, Madrid, Spain	(Spain) Real Madrid	(Spain) Getafe	4–0	4–0	La Liga
340	6 February 2013	Estádio D. Afonso Henriques, Guimarães, Portugal	Portugal	Ecuador	1–1	2–3	International friendly
341	9 February 2013	Santiago Bernabéu, Madrid, Spain	(Spain) Real Madrid	(Spain) Sevilla	2–0	4–1	La Liga
342	9 February 2013	Santiago Bernabéu, Madrid, Spain	(Spain) Real Madrid	(Spain) Sevilla	3–0	4–1	La Liga
343	9 February 2013	Santiago Bernabéu, Madrid, Spain	(Spain) Real Madrid	(Spain) Sevilla	4–0	4–1	La Liga
344	13 February 2013	Santiago Bernabéu, Madrid, Spain	(Spain) Real Madrid	(England) Manchester United	1–1	1–1	UEFA Champions League
345	26 February 2013	Camp Nou, Barcelona, Spain	(Spain) Real Madrid	(Spain) Barcelona	1–0	3–1	Copa del Rey
346	26 February 2013	Camp Nou, Barcelona, Spain	(Spain) Real Madrid	(Spain) Barcelona	2–0	3–1	Copa del Rey
347	5 March 2013	Old Trafford, Manchester, England	(Spain) Real Madrid	(England) Manchester United	2–1	2–1	UEFA Champions League
348	10 March 2013	Balaídos, Vigo, Spain	(Spain) Real Madrid	(Spain) Celta Vigo	1–0	2–1	La Liga
349	10 March 2013	Balaídos, Vigo, Spain	(Spain) Real Madrid	(Spain) Celta Vigo	2–1	2–1	La Liga
350	16 March 2013	Santiago Bernabéu, Madrid, Spain	(Spain) Real Madrid	(Spain) Mallorca	2–2	5–2	La Liga
351	30 March 2013	La Romareda, Zaragoza, Spain	(Spain) Real Madrid	(Spain) Zaragoza	1–1	1–1	La Liga
352	3 April 2013	Santiago Bernabéu, Madrid, Spain	(Spain) Real Madrid	(Turkey) Galatasaray	1–0	3–0	UEFA Champions League
353	6 April 2013	Santiago Bernabéu, Madrid, Spain	(Spain) Real Madrid	(Spain) Levante	3–1	5–1	La Liga
354	9 April 2013	Türk Telekom Stadium, Istanbul, Turkey	(Spain) Real Madrid	(Turkey) Galatasaray	1–0	2–3	UEFA Champions League
355	9 April 2013	Türk Telekom Stadium, Istanbul, Turkey	(Spain) Real Madrid	(Turkey) Galatasaray	2–3	2–3	UEFA Champions League
356	14 April 2013	San Mamés, Bilbao, Spain	(Spain) Real Madrid	(Spain) Athletic Bilbao	1–0	3–0	La Liga
357	14 April 2013	San Mamés, Bilbao, Spain	(Spain) Real Madrid	(Spain) Athletic Bilbao	2–0	3–0	La Liga
358	24 April 2013	Westfalenstadion, Dortmund, Germany	(Spain) Real Madrid	(Germany) Borussia Dortmund	1–1	1–4	UEFA Champions League
359	4 May 2013	Santiago Bernabéu, Madrid, Spain	(Spain) Real Madrid	(Spain) Valladolid	2–2	4–3	La Liga
360	4 May 2013	Santiago Bernabéu, Madrid, Spain	(Spain) Real Madrid	(Spain) Valladolid	4–2	4–3	La Liga
361	8 May 2013	Santiago Bernabéu, Madrid, Spain	(Spain) Real Madrid	(Spain) Málaga	2–1	6–2	La Liga
362	17 May 2013	Santiago Bernabéu, Madrid, Spain	(Spain) Real Madrid	(Spain) Atlético Madrid	1–0	1–2 (a.e.t.)	Copa del Rey
363	10 June 2013	Stade de Genève, Geneva, Switzerland	Portugal	Croatia	1–0	1–0	International friendly
364	14 August 2013	Estádio Algarve, Faro/Loulé, Portugal	Portugal	Netherlands	1–1	1–1	International friendly
365	1 September 2013	Santiago Bernabéu, Madrid, Spain	(Spain) Real Madrid	(Spain) Athletic Bilbao	2–0	3–1	La Liga
366	6 September 2013	Windsor Park, Belfast, Northern Ireland	Portugal	Northern Ireland	2–2	4–2	2014 FIFA World Cup qualification
367	6 September 2013	Windsor Park, Belfast, Northern Ireland	Portugal	Northern Ireland	3–2	4–2	2014 FIFA World Cup qualification
368	6 September 2013	Windsor Park, Belfast, Northern Ireland	Portugal	Northern Ireland	4–2	4–2	2014 FIFA World Cup qualification
369	14 September 2013	El Madrigal, Villarreal, Spain	(Spain) Real Madrid	(Spain) Villarreal	2–1	2–2	La Liga
370	17 September 2013	Türk Telekom Stadium, Istanbul, Turkey	(Spain) Real Madrid	(Turkey) Galatasaray	3–0	6–1	UEFA Champions League
371	17 September 2013	Türk Telekom Stadium, Istanbul, Turkey	(Spain) Real Madrid	(Turkey) Galatasaray	4–0	6–1	UEFA Champions League
372	17 September 2013	Türk Telekom Stadium, Istanbul, Turkey	(Spain) Real Madrid	(Turkey) Galatasaray	6–1	6–1	UEFA Champions League
373	22 September 2013	Santiago Bernabéu, Madrid, Spain	(Spain) Real Madrid	(Spain) Getafe	2–1	4–1	La Liga
374	22 September 2013	Santiago Bernabéu, Madrid, Spain	(Spain) Real Madrid	(Spain) Getafe	4–1	4–1	La Liga
375	25 September 2013	Martínez Valero, Elche, Spain	(Spain) Real Madrid	(Spain) Elche	1–0	2–1	La Liga
376	25 September 2013	Martínez Valero, Elche, Spain	(Spain) Real Madrid	(Spain) Elche	2–1	2–1	La Liga
377	2 October 2013	Santiago Bernabéu, Madrid, Spain	(Spain) Real Madrid	(Denmark) Copenhagen	1–0	4–0	UEFA Champions League
378	2 October 2013	Santiago Bernabéu, Madrid, Spain	(Spain) Real Madrid	(Denmark) Copenhagen	2–0	4–0	UEFA Champions League
379	5 October 2013	Ciutat de València, Valencia, Spain	(Spain) Real Madrid	(Spain) Levante	3–2	3–2	La Liga
380	19 October 2013	Santiago Bernabéu, Madrid, Spain	(Spain) Real Madrid	(Spain) Málaga	2–0	2–0	La Liga
381	23 October 2013	Santiago Bernabéu, Madrid, Spain	(Spain) Real Madrid	(Italy) Juventus	1–0	2–1	UEFA Champions League
382	23 October 2013	Santiago Bernabéu, Madrid, Spain	(Spain) Real Madrid	(Italy) Juventus	2–1	2–1	UEFA Champions League
383	30 October 2013	Santiago Bernabéu, Madrid, Spain	(Spain) Real Madrid	(Spain) Sevilla	3–0	7–3	La Liga
384	30 October 2013	Santiago Bernabéu, Madrid, Spain	(Spain) Real Madrid	(Spain) Sevilla	5–2	7–3	La Liga
385	30 October 2013	Santiago Bernabéu, Madrid, Spain	(Spain) Real Madrid	(Spain) Sevilla	6–3	7–3	La Liga
386	2 November 2013	Vallecas, Madrid, Spain	(Spain) Real Madrid	(Spain) Rayo Vallecano	1–0	3–2	La Liga
387	2 November 2013	Vallecas, Madrid, Spain	(Spain) Real Madrid	(Spain) Rayo Vallecano	3–0	3–2	La Liga
388	5 November 2013	Juventus Stadium, Turin, Italy	(Spain) Real Madrid	(Italy) Juventus	1–1	2–2	UEFA Champions League
389	9 November 2013	Santiago Bernabéu, Madrid, Spain	(Spain) Real Madrid	(Spain) Real Sociedad	1–0	5–1	La Liga
390	9 November 2013	Santiago Bernabéu, Madrid, Spain	(Spain) Real Madrid	(Spain) Real Sociedad	3–0	5–1	La Liga
391	9 November 2013	Santiago Bernabéu, Madrid, Spain	(Spain) Real Madrid	(Spain) Real Sociedad	5–1	5–1	La Liga
392	15 November 2013	Estádio da Luz, Lisbon, Portugal	Portugal	Sweden	1–0	1–0	2014 FIFA World Cup qualification
393	19 November 2013	Friends Arena, Solna, Sweden	Portugal	Sweden	1–0	3–2	2014 FIFA World Cup qualification
394	19 November 2013	Friends Arena, Solna, Sweden	Portugal	Sweden	2–2	3–2	2014 FIFA World Cup qualification
395	19 November 2013	Friends Arena, Solna, Sweden	Portugal	Sweden	3–2	3–2	2014 FIFA World Cup qualification
396	23 November 2013	Estadio de los Juegos Mediterráneos, Almería, Spain	(Spain) Real Madrid	(Spain) Almería	1–0	5–0	La Liga
397	10 December 2013	Parken Stadium, Copenhagen, Denmark	(Spain) Real Madrid	(Denmark) Copenhagen	2–0	2–0	UEFA Champions League
398	22 December 2013	Mestalla, Valencia, Spain	(Spain) Real Madrid	(Spain) Valencia	2–1	3–2	La Liga
399	6 January 2014	Santiago Bernabéu, Madrid, Spain	(Spain) Real Madrid	(Spain) Celta Vigo	2–0	3–0	La Liga
400	6 January 2014	Santiago Bernabéu, Madrid, Spain	(Spain) Real Madrid	(Spain) Celta Vigo	3–0	3–0	La Liga
401	15 January 2014	El Sadar, Pamplona, Spain	(Spain) Real Madrid	(Spain) Osasuna	1–0	2–0	Copa del Rey
402	18 January 2014	Benito Villamarín, Seville, Spain	(Spain) Real Madrid	(Spain) Real Betis	1–0	5–0	La Liga
403	25 January 2014	Santiago Bernabéu, Madrid, Spain	(Spain) Real Madrid	(Spain) Granada	1–0	2–0	La Liga
404	11 February 2014	Vicente Calderón, Madrid, Spain	(Spain) Real Madrid	(Spain) Atlético Madrid	1–0	2–0	Copa del Rey
405	11 February 2014	Vicente Calderón, Madrid, Spain	(Spain) Real Madrid	(Spain) Atlético Madrid	2–0	2–0	Copa del Rey
406	26 February 2014	Arena AufSchalke, Gelsenkirchen, Germany	(Spain) Real Madrid	(Germany) Schalke 04	3–0	6–1	UEFA Champions League
407	26 February 2014	Arena AufSchalke, Gelsenkirchen, Germany	(Spain) Real Madrid	(Germany) Schalke 04	6–0	6–1	UEFA Champions League
408	2 March 2014	Vicente Calderón, Madrid, Spain	(Spain) Real Madrid	(Spain) Atlético Madrid	2–2	2–2	La Liga
409	5 March 2014	Estádio Dr. Magalhães Pessoa, Leiria, Portugal	Portugal	Cameroon	1–0	5–1	International friendly
410	5 March 2014	Estádio Dr. Magalhães Pessoa, Leiria, Portugal	Portugal	Cameroon	1–0	5–1	International friendly
411	9 March 2014	Santiago Bernabéu, Madrid, Spain	(Spain) Real Madrid	(Spain) Levante	1–0	3–0	La Liga
412	15 March 2014	La Rosaleda, Málaga, Spain	(Spain) Real Madrid	(Spain) Málaga	1–0	1–0	La Liga
413	18 March 2014	Santiago Bernabéu, Madrid, Spain	(Spain) Real Madrid	(Germany) Schalke 04	1–0	3–1	UEFA Champions League
414	18 March 2014	Santiago Bernabéu, Madrid, Spain	(Spain) Real Madrid	(Germany) Schalke 04	2–1	3–1	UEFA Champions League
415	23 March 2014	Santiago Bernabéu, Madrid, Spain	(Spain) Real Madrid	(Spain) Barcelona	3–2	3–4	La Liga
416	26 March 2014	Ramón Sánchez Pizjuán, Seville, Spain	(Spain) Real Madrid	(Spain) Sevilla	1–0	1–2	La Liga
417	29 March 2014	Santiago Bernabéu, Madrid, Spain	(Spain) Real Madrid	(Spain) Rayo Vallecano	1–0	5–0	La Liga
418	2 April 2014	Santiago Bernabéu, Madrid, Spain	(Spain) Real Madrid	(Germany) Borussia Dortmund	3–0	3–0	UEFA Champions League
419	26 April 2014	Santiago Bernabéu, Madrid, Spain	(Spain) Real Madrid	(Spain) Osasuna	1–0	4–0	La Liga
420	26 April 2014	Santiago Bernabéu, Madrid, Spain	(Spain) Real Madrid	(Spain) Osasuna	2–0	4–0	La Liga
421	29 April 2014	Allianz Arena, Munich, Germany	(Spain) Real Madrid	(Germany) Bayern Munich	3–0	4–0	UEFA Champions League
422	29 April 2014	Allianz Arena, Munich, Germany	(Spain) Real Madrid	(Germany) Bayern Munich	4–0	4–0	UEFA Champions League
423	4 May 2014	Santiago Bernabéu, Madrid, Spain	(Spain) Real Madrid	(Spain) Valencia	2–2	2–2	La Liga
424	24 May 2014	Estádio da Luz, Lisbon, Portugal	(Spain) Real Madrid	(Spain) Atlético Madrid	4–1	4–1 (a.e.t.)	UEFA Champions League
425	26 June 2014	Estádio Nacional Mané Garrincha, Brasília, Brazil	Portugal	Ghana	2–1	2–1	2014 FIFA World Cup
426	12 August 2014	Cardiff City Stadium, Cardiff, Wales	(Spain) Real Madrid	(Spain) Sevilla	1–0	2–0	UEFA Super Cup
427	12 August 2014	Cardiff City Stadium, Cardiff, Wales	(Spain) Real Madrid	(Spain) Sevilla	2–0	2–0	UEFA Super Cup
428	25 August 2014	Santiago Bernabéu, Madrid, Spain	(Spain) Real Madrid	(Spain) Córdoba	2–0	2–0	La Liga
429	13 September 2014	Santiago Bernabéu, Madrid, Spain	(Spain) Real Madrid	(Spain) Atlético Madrid	1–1	1–2	La Liga
430	16 September 2014	Santiago Bernabéu, Madrid, Spain	(Spain) Real Madrid	(Switzerland) Basel	3–0	5–1	UEFA Champions League
431	20 September 2014	Riazor, A Coruña, Spain	(Spain) Real Madrid	(Spain) Deportivo La Coruña	1–0	8–2	La Liga
432	20 September 2014	Riazor, A Coruña, Spain	(Spain) Real Madrid	(Spain) Deportivo La Coruña	3–0	8–2	La Liga
433	20 September 2014	Riazor, A Coruña, Spain	(Spain) Real Madrid	(Spain) Deportivo La Coruña	6–1	8–2	La Liga
434	23 September 2014	Santiago Bernabéu, Madrid, Spain	(Spain) Real Madrid	(Spain) Elche	2–1	5–1	La Liga
435	23 September 2014	Santiago Bernabéu, Madrid, Spain	(Spain) Real Madrid	(Spain) Elche	3–1	5–1	La Liga
436	23 September 2014	Santiago Bernabéu, Madrid, Spain	(Spain) Real Madrid	(Spain) Elche	4–1	5–1	La Liga
437	23 September 2014	Santiago Bernabéu, Madrid, Spain	(Spain) Real Madrid	(Spain) Elche	5–1	5–1	La Liga
438	27 September 2014	El Madrigal, Villarreal, Spain	(Spain) Real Madrid	(Spain) Villarreal	2–0	2–0	La Liga
439	1 October 2014	Vasil Levski National Stadium, Sofia, Bulgaria	(Spain) Real Madrid	(Bulgaria) Ludogorets Razgrad	1–1	2–1	UEFA Champions League
440	5 October 2014	Santiago Bernabéu, Madrid, Spain	(Spain) Real Madrid	(Spain) Athletic Bilbao	1–0	5–0	La Liga
441	5 October 2014	Santiago Bernabéu, Madrid, Spain	(Spain) Real Madrid	(Spain) Athletic Bilbao	3–0	5–0	La Liga
442	5 October 2014	Santiago Bernabéu, Madrid, Spain	(Spain) Real Madrid	(Spain) Athletic Bilbao	5–0	5–0	La Liga
443	14 October 2014	Parken Stadium, Copenhagen, Denmark	Portugal	Denmark	1–0	1–0	UEFA Euro 2016 qualifying
444	18 October 2014	Ciutat de València, Valencia, Spain	(Spain) Real Madrid	(Spain) Levante	1–0	5–0	La Liga
445	18 October 2014	Ciutat de València, Valencia, Spain	(Spain) Real Madrid	(Spain) Levante	3–0	5–0	La Liga
446	22 October 2014	Anfield, Liverpool, England	(Spain) Real Madrid	(England) Liverpool	1–0	3–0	UEFA Champions League
447	25 October 2014	Santiago Bernabéu, Madrid, Spain	(Spain) Real Madrid	(Spain) Barcelona	1–1	3–1	La Liga
448	1 November 2014	Los Cármenes, Granada, Spain	(Spain) Real Madrid	(Spain) Granada	1–0	4–0	La Liga
449	8 November 2014	Santiago Bernabéu, Madrid, Spain	(Spain) Real Madrid	(Spain) Rayo Vallecano	5–1	5–1	La Liga
450	14 November 2014	Estádio Algarve, Faro/Loulé, Portugal	Portugal	Armenia	1–0	1–0	UEFA Euro 2016 qualifying
451	22 November 2014	Ipurua, Eibar, Spain	(Spain) Real Madrid	(Spain) Eibar	2–0	4–0	La Liga
452	22 November 2014	Ipurua, Eibar, Spain	(Spain) Real Madrid	(Spain) Eibar	4–0	4–0	La Liga
453	26 November 2014	St. Jakob-Park, Basel, Switzerland	(Spain) Real Madrid	(Switzerland) Basel	1–0	1–0	UEFA Champions League
454	6 December 2014	Santiago Bernabéu, Madrid, Spain	(Spain) Real Madrid	(Spain) Celta Vigo	1–0	3–0	La Liga
455	6 December 2014	Santiago Bernabéu, Madrid, Spain	(Spain) Real Madrid	(Spain) Celta Vigo	2–0	3–0	La Liga
456	6 December 2014	Santiago Bernabéu, Madrid, Spain	(Spain) Real Madrid	(Spain) Celta Vigo	3–0	3–0	La Liga
457	9 December 2014	Santiago Bernabéu, Madrid, Spain	(Spain) Real Madrid	(Bulgaria) Ludogorets Razgrad	1–0	4–0	UEFA Champions League
458	12 December 2014	Estadio de los Juegos Mediterráneos, Almería, Spain	(Spain) Real Madrid	(Spain) Almería	3–1	4–1	La Liga
459	12 December 2014	Estadio de los Juegos Mediterráneos, Almería, Spain	(Spain) Real Madrid	(Spain) Almería	4–1	4–1	La Liga
460	4 January 2015	Mestalla, Valencia, Spain	(Spain) Real Madrid	(Spain) Valencia	1–0	1–2	La Liga
461	15 January 2015	Santiago Bernabéu, Madrid, Spain	(Spain) Real Madrid	(Spain) Atlético Madrid	2–2	2–2	Copa del Rey
462	18 January 2015	Coliseum Alfonso Pérez, Getafe, Spain	(Spain) Real Madrid	(Spain) Getafe	1–0	3–0	La Liga
463	18 January 2015	Coliseum Alfonso Pérez, Getafe, Spain	(Spain) Real Madrid	(Spain) Getafe	2–0	3–0	La Liga
464	18 February 2015	Arena AufSchalke, Gelsenkirchen, Germany	(Spain) Real Madrid	(Germany) Schalke 04	1–0	2–0	UEFA Champions League
465	22 February 2015	Martínez Valero, Elche, Spain	(Spain) Real Madrid	(Spain) Elche	2–0	2–0	La Liga
466	1 March 2015	Santiago Bernabéu, Madrid, Spain	(Spain) Real Madrid	(Spain) Villarreal	1–0	1–1	La Liga
467	10 March 2015	Santiago Bernabéu, Madrid, Spain	(Spain) Real Madrid	(Germany) Schalke 04	1–1	3–4	UEFA Champions League
468	10 March 2015	Santiago Bernabéu, Madrid, Spain	(Spain) Real Madrid	(Germany) Schalke 04	2–2	3–4	UEFA Champions League
469	22 March 2015	Camp Nou, Barcelona, Spain	(Spain) Real Madrid	(Spain) Barcelona	1–1	1–2	La Liga
470	5 April 2015	Santiago Bernabéu, Madrid, Spain	(Spain) Real Madrid	(Spain) Granada	2–0	9–1	La Liga
471	5 April 2015	Santiago Bernabéu, Madrid, Spain	(Spain) Real Madrid	(Spain) Granada	3–0	9–1	La Liga
472	5 April 2015	Santiago Bernabéu, Madrid, Spain	(Spain) Real Madrid	(Spain) Granada	4–0	9–1	La Liga
473	5 April 2015	Santiago Bernabéu, Madrid, Spain	(Spain) Real Madrid	(Spain) Granada	6–0	9–1	La Liga
474	5 April 2015	Santiago Bernabéu, Madrid, Spain	(Spain) Real Madrid	(Spain) Granada	9–1	9–1	La Liga
475	8 April 2015	Vallecas, Madrid, Spain	(Spain) Real Madrid	(Spain) Rayo Vallecano	1–0	2–0	La Liga
476	11 April 2015	Santiago Bernabéu, Madrid, Spain	(Spain) Real Madrid	(Spain) Eibar	1–0	3–0	La Liga
477	18 April 2015	Santiago Bernabéu, Madrid, Spain	(Spain) Real Madrid	(Spain) Málaga	3–1	3–1	La Liga
478	2 May 2015	Ramón Sánchez Pizjuán, Seville, Spain	(Spain) Real Madrid	(Spain) Sevilla	1–0	3–2	La Liga
479	2 May 2015	Ramón Sánchez Pizjuán, Seville, Spain	(Spain) Real Madrid	(Spain) Sevilla	2–0	3–2	La Liga
480	2 May 2015	Ramón Sánchez Pizjuán, Seville, Spain	(Spain) Real Madrid	(Spain) Sevilla	3–1	3–2	La Liga
481	5 May 2015	Juventus Stadium, Turin, Italy	(Spain) Real Madrid	(Italy) Juventus	1–1	1–2	UEFA Champions League
482	13 May 2015	Santiago Bernabéu, Madrid, Spain	(Spain) Real Madrid	(Italy) Juventus	1–0	1–1	UEFA Champions League
483	17 May 2015	Cornellà-El Prat, Barcelona, Spain	(Spain) Real Madrid	(Spain) Espanyol	1–0	4–1	La Liga
484	17 May 2015	Cornellà-El Prat, Barcelona, Spain	(Spain) Real Madrid	(Spain) Espanyol	3–1	4–1	La Liga
485	17 May 2015	Cornellà-El Prat, Barcelona, Spain	(Spain) Real Madrid	(Spain) Espanyol	4–1	4–1	La Liga
486	23 May 2015	Santiago Bernabéu, Madrid, Spain	(Spain) Real Madrid	(Spain) Getafe	1–0	7–3	La Liga
487	23 May 2015	Santiago Bernabéu, Madrid, Spain	(Spain) Real Madrid	(Spain) Getafe	2–2	7–3	La Liga
488	23 May 2015	Santiago Bernabéu, Madrid, Spain	(Spain) Real Madrid	(Spain) Getafe	3–2	7–3	La Liga
489	13 June 2015	Vazgen Sargsyan Republican Stadium, Yerevan, Armenia	Portugal	Armenia	1–1	3–2	UEFA Euro 2016 qualifying
490	13 June 2015	Vazgen Sargsyan Republican Stadium, Yerevan, Armenia	Portugal	Armenia	2–1	3–2	UEFA Euro 2016 qualifying
491	13 June 2015	Vazgen Sargsyan Republican Stadium, Yerevan, Armenia	Portugal	Armenia	3–1	3–2	UEFA Euro 2016 qualifying
492	12 September 2015	Power8 Stadium, Barcelona, Spain	(Spain) Real Madrid	(Spain) Espanyol	1–0	6–0	La Liga
493	12 September 2015	Power8 Stadium, Barcelona, Spain	(Spain) Real Madrid	(Spain) Espanyol	2–0	6–0	La Liga
494	12 September 2015	Power8 Stadium, Barcelona, Spain	(Spain) Real Madrid	(Spain) Espanyol	3–0	6–0	La Liga
495	12 September 2015	Power8 Stadium, Barcelona, Spain	(Spain) Real Madrid	(Spain) Espanyol	5–0	6–0	La Liga
496	12 September 2015	Power8 Stadium, Barcelona, Spain	(Spain) Real Madrid	(Spain) Espanyol	6–0	6–0	La Liga
497	15 September 2015	Santiago Bernabéu, Madrid, Spain	(Spain) Real Madrid	(Ukraine) Shakhtar Donetsk	2–0	4–0	UEFA Champions League
498	15 September 2015	Santiago Bernabéu, Madrid, Spain	(Spain) Real Madrid	(Ukraine) Shakhtar Donetsk	3–0	4–0	UEFA Champions League
499	15 September 2015	Santiago Bernabéu, Madrid, Spain	(Spain) Real Madrid	(Ukraine) Shakhtar Donetsk	4–0	4–0	UEFA Champions League
500	30 September 2015	Eleda Stadion, Malmö, Sweden	(Spain) Real Madrid	(Sweden) Malmö FF	1–0	2–0	UEFA Champions League
501	30 September 2015	Eleda Stadion, Malmö, Sweden	(Spain) Real Madrid	(Sweden) Malmö FF	2–0	2–0	UEFA Champions League
502	17 October 2015	Santiago Bernabéu, Madrid, Spain	(Spain) Real Madrid	(Spain) Levante	2–0	3–0	La Liga
503	24 October 2015	Balaídos, Vigo, Spain	(Spain) Real Madrid	(Spain) Celta Vigo	1–0	3–1	La Liga
504	31 October 2015	Santiago Bernabéu, Madrid, Spain	(Spain) Real Madrid	(Spain) Las Palmas	2–0	3–1	La Liga
505	25 November 2015	Arena Lviv, Lviv, Ukraine	(Spain) Real Madrid	(Ukraine) Shakhtar Donetsk	1–0	4–3	UEFA Champions League
506	25 November 2015	Arena Lviv, Lviv, Ukraine	(Spain) Real Madrid	(Ukraine) Shakhtar Donetsk	4–0	4–3	UEFA Champions League
507	29 November 2015	Ipurua, Eibar, Spain	(Spain) Real Madrid	(Spain) Eibar	2–0	2–0	La Liga
508	5 December 2015	Santiago Bernabéu, Madrid, Spain	(Spain) Real Madrid	(Spain) Getafe	4–0	4–1	La Liga
509	8 December 2015	Santiago Bernabéu, Madrid, Spain	(Spain) Real Madrid	(Sweden) Malmö FF	3–0	8–0	UEFA Champions League
510	8 December 2015	Santiago Bernabéu, Madrid, Spain	(Spain) Real Madrid	(Sweden) Malmö FF	4–0	8–0	UEFA Champions League
511	8 December 2015	Santiago Bernabéu, Madrid, Spain	(Spain) Real Madrid	(Sweden) Malmö FF	5–0	8–0	UEFA Champions League
512	8 December 2015	Santiago Bernabéu, Madrid, Spain	(Spain) Real Madrid	(Sweden) Malmö FF	6–0	8–0	UEFA Champions League
513	20 December 2015	Santiago Bernabéu, Madrid, Spain	(Spain) Real Madrid	(Spain) Rayo Vallecano	3–2	10–2	La Liga
514	20 December 2015	Santiago Bernabéu, Madrid, Spain	(Spain) Real Madrid	(Spain) Rayo Vallecano	6–2	10–2	La Liga
515	30 December 2015	Santiago Bernabéu, Madrid, Spain	(Spain) Real Madrid	(Spain) Real Sociedad	1–0	3–1	La Liga
516	30 December 2015	Santiago Bernabéu, Madrid, Spain	(Spain) Real Madrid	(Spain) Real Sociedad	2–1	3–1	La Liga
517	17 January 2016	Santiago Bernabéu, Madrid, Spain	(Spain) Real Madrid	(Spain) Sporting Gijón	2–0	5–1	La Liga
518	17 January 2016	Santiago Bernabéu, Madrid, Spain	(Spain) Real Madrid	(Spain) Sporting Gijón	4–0	5–1	La Liga
519	31 January 2016	Santiago Bernabéu, Madrid, Spain	(Spain) Real Madrid	(Spain) Espanyol	2–0	6–0	La Liga
520	31 January 2016	Santiago Bernabéu, Madrid, Spain	(Spain) Real Madrid	(Spain) Espanyol	4–0	6–0	La Liga
521	31 January 2016	Santiago Bernabéu, Madrid, Spain	(Spain) Real Madrid	(Spain) Espanyol	5–0	6–0	La Liga
522	13 February 2016	Santiago Bernabéu, Madrid, Spain	(Spain) Real Madrid	(Spain) Athletic Bilbao	1–0	4–2	La Liga
523	13 February 2016	Santiago Bernabéu, Madrid, Spain	(Spain) Real Madrid	(Spain) Athletic Bilbao	4–1	4–2	La Liga
524	17 February 2016	Stadio Olimpico, Rome, Italy	(Spain) Real Madrid	(Italy) Roma	1–0	2–0	UEFA Champions League
525	21 February 2016	La Rosaleda, Málaga, Spain	(Spain) Real Madrid	(Spain) Málaga	1–0	1–1	La Liga
526	2 March 2016	Ciutat de València, Valencia, Spain	(Spain) Real Madrid	(Spain) Levante	1–0	3–1	La Liga
527	5 March 2016	Santiago Bernabéu, Madrid, Spain	(Spain) Real Madrid	(Spain) Celta Vigo	2–0	7–1	La Liga
528	5 March 2016	Santiago Bernabéu, Madrid, Spain	(Spain) Real Madrid	(Spain) Celta Vigo	3–0	7–1	La Liga
529	5 March 2016	Santiago Bernabéu, Madrid, Spain	(Spain) Real Madrid	(Spain) Celta Vigo	4–1	7–1	La Liga
530	5 March 2016	Santiago Bernabéu, Madrid, Spain	(Spain) Real Madrid	(Spain) Celta Vigo	5–1	7–1	La Liga
531	8 March 2016	Santiago Bernabéu, Madrid, Spain	(Spain) Real Madrid	(Italy) Roma	1–0	2–0	UEFA Champions League
532	20 March 2016	Santiago Bernabéu, Madrid, Spain	(Spain) Real Madrid	(Spain) Sevilla	2–0	4–0	La Liga
533	29 March 2016	Estádio Dr. Magalhães Pessoa, Leiria, Portugal	Portugal	Belgium	2–0	2–1	International friendly
534	2 April 2016	Camp Nou, Barcelona, Spain	(Spain) Real Madrid	(Spain) Barcelona	2–1	2–1	La Liga
535	9 April 2016	Santiago Bernabéu, Madrid, Spain	(Spain) Real Madrid	(Spain) Eibar	3–0	4–0	La Liga
536	12 April 2016	Santiago Bernabéu, Madrid, Spain	(Spain) Real Madrid	(Germany) VfL Wolfsburg	1–0	3–0	UEFA Champions League
537	12 April 2016	Santiago Bernabéu, Madrid, Spain	(Spain) Real Madrid	(Germany) VfL Wolfsburg	2–0	3–0	UEFA Champions League
538	12 April 2016	Santiago Bernabéu, Madrid, Spain	(Spain) Real Madrid	(Germany) VfL Wolfsburg	3–0	3–0	UEFA Champions League
539	16 April 2016	Coliseum Alfonso Pérez, Getafe, Spain	(Spain) Real Madrid	(Spain) Getafe	5–1	5–1	La Liga
540	8 May 2016	Santiago Bernabéu, Madrid, Spain	(Spain) Real Madrid	(Spain) Valencia	1–0	3–2	La Liga
541	8 May 2016	Santiago Bernabéu, Madrid, Spain	(Spain) Real Madrid	(Spain) Valencia	3–1	3–2	La Liga
542	14 May 2016	Riazor, A Coruña, Spain	(Spain) Real Madrid	(Spain) Deportivo La Coruña	1–0	2–0	La Liga
543	14 May 2016	Riazor, A Coruña, Spain	(Spain) Real Madrid	(Spain) Deportivo La Coruña	2–0	2–0	La Liga
544	8 June 2016	Estádio da Luz, Lisbon, Portugal	Portugal	Estonia	1–0	7–0	International friendly
545	8 June 2016	Estádio da Luz, Lisbon, Portugal	Portugal	Estonia	3–0	7–0	International friendly
546	22 June 2016	Parc Olympique Lyonnais, Lyon, France	Portugal	Hungary	2–2	3–3	UEFA Euro 2016
547	22 June 2016	Parc Olympique Lyonnais, Lyon, France	Portugal	Hungary	3–3	3–3	UEFA Euro 2016
548	6 July 2016	Parc Olympique Lyonnais, Lyon, France	Portugal	Wales	1–0	2–0	UEFA Euro 2016
549	10 September 2016	Santiago Bernabéu, Madrid, Spain	(Spain) Real Madrid	(Spain) Osasuna	1–0	5–2	La Liga
550	14 September 2016	Santiago Bernabéu, Madrid, Spain	(Spain) Real Madrid	(Portugal) Sporting CP	1–1	2–1	UEFA Champions League
551	27 September 2016	Westfalenstadion, Dortmund, Germany	(Spain) Real Madrid	(Germany) Borussia Dortmund	1–0	2–2	UEFA Champions League
552	7 October 2016	Estádio Municipal de Aveiro, Aveiro, Portugal	Portugal	Andorra	1–0	6–0	2018 FIFA World Cup qualification
553	7 October 2016	Estádio Municipal de Aveiro, Aveiro, Portugal	Portugal	Andorra	2–0	6–0	2018 FIFA World Cup qualification
554	7 October 2016	Estádio Municipal de Aveiro, Aveiro, Portugal	Portugal	Andorra	4–0	6–0	2018 FIFA World Cup qualification
555	7 October 2016	Estádio Municipal de Aveiro, Aveiro, Portugal	Portugal	Andorra	5–0	6–0	2018 FIFA World Cup qualification
556	10 October 2016	Tórsvøllur, Tórshavn, Faroe Islands	Portugal	Faroe Islands	4–0	6–0	2018 FIFA World Cup qualification
557	15 October 2016	Benito Villamarín, Seville, Spain	(Spain) Real Madrid	(Spain) Real Betis	6–1	6–1	La Liga
558	29 October 2016	Mendizorrotza, Vitoria-Gasteiz, Spain	(Spain) Real Madrid	(Spain) Alavés	1–1	4–1	La Liga
559	29 October 2016	Mendizorrotza, Vitoria-Gasteiz, Spain	(Spain) Real Madrid	(Spain) Alavés	2–1	4–1	La Liga
560	29 October 2016	Mendizorrotza, Vitoria-Gasteiz, Spain	(Spain) Real Madrid	(Spain) Alavés	4–1	4–1	La Liga
561	13 November 2016	Estádio Algarve, Faro/Loulé, Portugal	Portugal	Latvia	1–0	4–1	2018 FIFA World Cup qualification
562	13 November 2016	Estádio Algarve, Faro/Loulé, Portugal	Portugal	Latvia	3–1	4–1	2018 FIFA World Cup qualification
563	19 November 2016	Vicente Calderón, Madrid, Spain	(Spain) Real Madrid	(Spain) Atlético Madrid	1–0	3–0	La Liga
564	19 November 2016	Vicente Calderón, Madrid, Spain	(Spain) Real Madrid	(Spain) Atlético Madrid	2–0	3–0	La Liga
565	19 November 2016	Vicente Calderón, Madrid, Spain	(Spain) Real Madrid	(Spain) Atlético Madrid	3–0	3–0	La Liga
566	26 November 2016	Santiago Bernabéu, Madrid, Spain	(Spain) Real Madrid	(Spain) Sporting Gijón	1–0	2–1	La Liga
567	26 November 2016	Santiago Bernabéu, Madrid, Spain	(Spain) Real Madrid	(Spain) Sporting Gijón	2–0	2–1	La Liga
568	15 December 2016	Nissan Stadium, Yokohama, Japan	(Spain) Real Madrid	(Mexico) América	2–0	2–0	FIFA Club World Cup
569	18 December 2016	Nissan Stadium, Yokohama, Japan	(Spain) Real Madrid	(Japan) Kashima Antlers	2–2	4–2 (a.e.t.)	FIFA Club World Cup
570	18 December 2016	Nissan Stadium, Yokohama, Japan	(Spain) Real Madrid	(Japan) Kashima Antlers	3–2	4–2 (a.e.t.)	FIFA Club World Cup
571	18 December 2016	Nissan Stadium, Yokohama, Japan	(Spain) Real Madrid	(Japan) Kashima Antlers	4–2	4–2 (a.e.t.)	FIFA Club World Cup
572	7 January 2017	Santiago Bernabéu, Madrid, Spain	(Spain) Real Madrid	(Spain) Granada	3–0	5–0	La Liga
573	15 January 2017	Ramón Sánchez Pizjuán, Seville, Spain	(Spain) Real Madrid	(Spain) Sevilla	1–0	1–2	La Liga
574	25 January 2017	Balaídos, Vigo, Spain	(Spain) Real Madrid	(Spain) Celta Vigo	1–1	2–2	Copa del Rey
575	29 January 2017	Santiago Bernabéu, Madrid, Spain	(Spain) Real Madrid	(Spain) Real Sociedad	2–0	3–0	La Liga
576	11 February 2017	El Sadar, Pamplona, Spain	(Spain) Real Madrid	(Spain) Osasuna	1–0	3–1	La Liga
577	22 February 2017	Mestalla, Valencia, Spain	(Spain) Real Madrid	(Spain) Valencia	1–2	1–2	La Liga
578	26 February 2017	El Madrigal, Villarreal, Spain	(Spain) Real Madrid	(Spain) Villarreal	2–2	3–2	La Liga
579	1 March 2017	Santiago Bernabéu, Madrid, Spain	(Spain) Real Madrid	(Spain) Las Palmas	2–3	3–3	La Liga
580	1 March 2017	Santiago Bernabéu, Madrid, Spain	(Spain) Real Madrid	(Spain) Las Palmas	3–3	3–3	La Liga
581	12 March 2017	Santiago Bernabéu, Madrid, Spain	(Spain) Real Madrid	(Spain) Real Betis	1–1	2–1	La Liga
582	25 March 2017	Estádio da Luz, Lisbon, Portugal	Portugal	Hungary	2–0	3–0	2018 FIFA World Cup qualification
583	25 March 2017	Estádio da Luz, Lisbon, Portugal	Portugal	Hungary	3–0	3–0	2018 FIFA World Cup qualification
584	28 March 2017	Estádio do Marítimo, Funchal, Portugal	Portugal	Sweden	1–0	2–3	International friendly
585	12 April 2017	Allianz Arena, Munich, Germany	(Spain) Real Madrid	(Germany) Bayern Munich	1–1	2–1	UEFA Champions League
586	12 April 2017	Allianz Arena, Munich, Germany	(Spain) Real Madrid	(Germany) Bayern Munich	2–1	2–1	UEFA Champions League
587	18 April 2017	Santiago Bernabéu, Madrid, Spain	(Spain) Real Madrid	(Germany) Bayern Munich	1–1	4–2 (a.e.t.)	UEFA Champions League
588	18 April 2017	Santiago Bernabéu, Madrid, Spain	(Spain) Real Madrid	(Germany) Bayern Munich	2–2	4–2 (a.e.t.)	UEFA Champions League
589	18 April 2017	Santiago Bernabéu, Madrid, Spain	(Spain) Real Madrid	(Germany) Bayern Munich	3–2	4–2 (a.e.t.)	UEFA Champions League
590	29 April 2017	Santiago Bernabéu, Madrid, Spain	(Spain) Real Madrid	(Spain) Valencia	1–0	2–1	La Liga
591	2 May 2017	Santiago Bernabéu, Madrid, Spain	(Spain) Real Madrid	(Spain) Atlético Madrid	1–0	3–0	UEFA Champions League
592	2 May 2017	Santiago Bernabéu, Madrid, Spain	(Spain) Real Madrid	(Spain) Atlético Madrid	2–0	3–0	UEFA Champions League
593	2 May 2017	Santiago Bernabéu, Madrid, Spain	(Spain) Real Madrid	(Spain) Atlético Madrid	3–0	3–0	UEFA Champions League
594	14 May 2017	Santiago Bernabéu, Madrid, Spain	(Spain) Real Madrid	(Spain) Sevilla	2–0	4–1	La Liga
595	14 May 2017	Santiago Bernabéu, Madrid, Spain	(Spain) Real Madrid	(Spain) Sevilla	3–1	4–1	La Liga
596	17 May 2017	Balaídos, Vigo, Spain	(Spain) Real Madrid	(Spain) Celta Vigo	1–0	4–1	La Liga
597	17 May 2017	Balaídos, Vigo, Spain	(Spain) Real Madrid	(Spain) Celta Vigo	2–0	4–1	La Liga
598	21 May 2017	La Rosaleda, Málaga, Spain	(Spain) Real Madrid	(Spain) Málaga	1–0	2–0	La Liga
599	3 June 2017	Millennium Stadium, Cardiff, Wales	(Spain) Real Madrid	(Italy) Juventus	1–0	4–1	UEFA Champions League
600	3 June 2017	Millennium Stadium, Cardiff, Wales	(Spain) Real Madrid	(Italy) Juventus	3–1	4–1	UEFA Champions League
601	9 June 2017	Skonto Stadium, Riga, Latvia	Portugal	Latvia	1–0	3–0	2018 FIFA World Cup qualification
602	9 June 2017	Skonto Stadium, Riga, Latvia	Portugal	Latvia	2–0	3–0	2018 FIFA World Cup qualification
603	21 June 2017	Spartak Stadium, Moscow, Russia	Portugal	Russia	1–0	1–0	2017 FIFA Confederations Cup
604	24 June 2017	Krestovsky Stadium, Saint Petersburg, Russia	Portugal	New Zealand	1–0	4–0	2017 FIFA Confederations Cup
605	13 August 2017	Camp Nou, Barcelona, Spain	(Spain) Real Madrid	(Spain) Barcelona	2–1	3–1	Supercopa de España
606	31 August 2017	Estádio do Bessa, Porto, Portugal	Portugal	Faroe Islands	1–0	5–1	2018 FIFA World Cup qualification
607	31 August 2017	Estádio do Bessa, Porto, Portugal	Portugal	Faroe Islands	2–0	5–1	2018 FIFA World Cup qualification
608	31 August 2017	Estádio do Bessa, Porto, Portugal	Portugal	Faroe Islands	4–1	5–1	2018 FIFA World Cup qualification
609	13 September 2017	Santiago Bernabéu, Madrid, Spain	(Spain) Real Madrid	(Cyprus) APOEL	1–0	3–0	UEFA Champions League
610	13 September 2017	Santiago Bernabéu, Madrid, Spain	(Spain) Real Madrid	(Cyprus) APOEL	2–0	3–0	UEFA Champions League
611	26 September 2017	Westfalenstadion, Dortmund, Germany	(Spain) Real Madrid	(Germany) Borussia Dortmund	2–0	3–1	UEFA Champions League
612	26 September 2017	Westfalenstadion, Dortmund, Germany	(Spain) Real Madrid	(Germany) Borussia Dortmund	3–1	3–1	UEFA Champions League
613	7 October 2017	Estadi Nacional, Andorra la Vella, Andorra	Portugal	Andorra	1–0	2–0	2018 FIFA World Cup qualification
614	14 October 2017	Coliseum Alfonso Pérez, Getafe, Spain	(Spain) Real Madrid	(Spain) Getafe	2–1	2–1	La Liga
615	17 October 2017	Santiago Bernabéu, Madrid, Spain	(Spain) Real Madrid	(England) Tottenham Hotspur	1–1	1–1	UEFA Champions League
616	1 November 2017	Wembley Stadium, London, England	(Spain) Real Madrid	(England) Tottenham Hotspur	1–3	1–3	UEFA Champions League
617	21 November 2017	GSP Stadium, Strovolos, Cyprus	(Spain) Real Madrid	(Cyprus) APOEL	5–0	6–0	UEFA Champions League
618	21 November 2017	GSP Stadium, Strovolos, Cyprus	(Spain) Real Madrid	(Cyprus) APOEL	6–0	6–0	UEFA Champions League
619	25 November 2017	Santiago Bernabéu, Madrid, Spain	(Spain) Real Madrid	(Spain) Málaga	3–2	3–2	La Liga
620	6 December 2017	Santiago Bernabéu, Madrid, Spain	(Spain) Real Madrid	(Germany) Borussia Dortmund	2–0	3–2	UEFA Champions League
621	9 December 2017	Santiago Bernabéu, Madrid, Spain	(Spain) Real Madrid	(Spain) Sevilla	2–0	5–0	La Liga
622	9 December 2017	Santiago Bernabéu, Madrid, Spain	(Spain) Real Madrid	(Spain) Sevilla	3–0	5–0	La Liga
623	13 December 2017	Zayed Sports City Stadium, Abu Dhabi, United Arab Emirates	(Spain) Real Madrid	(United Arab Emirates) Al-Jazira	1–1	2–1	FIFA Club World Cup
624	16 December 2017	Zayed Sports City Stadium, Abu Dhabi, United Arab Emirates	(Spain) Real Madrid	(Brazil) Grêmio	1–0	1–0	FIFA Club World Cup
625	21 January 2018	Santiago Bernabéu, Madrid, Spain	(Spain) Real Madrid	(Spain) Deportivo La Coruña	5–1	7–1	La Liga
626	21 January 2018	Santiago Bernabéu, Madrid, Spain	(Spain) Real Madrid	(Spain) Deportivo La Coruña	6–1	7–1	La Liga
627	27 January 2018	Mestalla, Valencia, Spain	(Spain) Real Madrid	(Spain) Valencia	1–0	4–1	La Liga
628	27 January 2018	Mestalla, Valencia, Spain	(Spain) Real Madrid	(Spain) Valencia	2–0	4–1	La Liga
629	10 February 2018	Santiago Bernabéu, Madrid, Spain	(Spain) Real Madrid	(Spain) Real Sociedad	2–0	5–2	La Liga
630	10 February 2018	Santiago Bernabéu, Madrid, Spain	(Spain) Real Madrid	(Spain) Real Sociedad	4–0	5–2	La Liga
631	10 February 2018	Santiago Bernabéu, Madrid, Spain	(Spain) Real Madrid	(Spain) Real Sociedad	5–1	5–2	La Liga
632	14 February 2018	Santiago Bernabéu, Madrid, Spain	(Spain) Real Madrid	(France) Paris Saint-Germain	1–1	3–1	UEFA Champions League
633	14 February 2018	Santiago Bernabéu, Madrid, Spain	(Spain) Real Madrid	(France) Paris Saint-Germain	2–1	3–1	UEFA Champions League
634	18 February 2018	Benito Villamarín, Seville, Spain	(Spain) Real Madrid	(Spain) Real Betis	4–2	5–3	La Liga
635	24 February 2018	Santiago Bernabéu, Madrid, Spain	(Spain) Real Madrid	(Spain) Alavés	1–0	4–0	La Liga
636	24 February 2018	Santiago Bernabéu, Madrid, Spain	(Spain) Real Madrid	(Spain) Alavés	3–0	4–0	La Liga
637	3 March 2018	Santiago Bernabéu, Madrid, Spain	(Spain) Real Madrid	(Spain) Getafe	2–0	3–0	La Liga
638	3 March 2018	Santiago Bernabéu, Madrid, Spain	(Spain) Real Madrid	(Spain) Getafe	3–0	3–0	La Liga
639	6 March 2018	Parc des Princes, Paris, France	(Spain) Real Madrid	(France) Paris Saint-Germain	1–0	2–1	UEFA Champions League
640	10 March 2018	Ipurua, Eibar, Spain	(Spain) Real Madrid	(Spain) Eibar	1–0	2–1	La Liga
641	10 March 2018	Ipurua, Eibar, Spain	(Spain) Real Madrid	(Spain) Eibar	2–1	2–1	La Liga
642	18 March 2018	Santiago Bernabéu, Madrid, Spain	(Spain) Real Madrid	(Spain) Girona	1–0	6–3	La Liga
643	18 March 2018	Santiago Bernabéu, Madrid, Spain	(Spain) Real Madrid	(Spain) Girona	2–1	6–3	La Liga
644	18 March 2018	Santiago Bernabéu, Madrid, Spain	(Spain) Real Madrid	(Spain) Girona	4–1	6–3	La Liga
645	18 March 2018	Santiago Bernabéu, Madrid, Spain	(Spain) Real Madrid	(Spain) Girona	6–3	6–3	La Liga
646	23 March 2018	Letzigrund, Zurich, Switzerland	Portugal	Egypt	1–1	2–1	International friendly
647	23 March 2018	Letzigrund, Zurich, Switzerland	Portugal	Egypt	2–1	2–1	International friendly
648	3 April 2018	Juventus Stadium, Turin, Italy	(Spain) Real Madrid	(Italy) Juventus	1–0	3–0	UEFA Champions League
649	3 April 2018	Juventus Stadium, Turin, Italy	(Spain) Real Madrid	(Italy) Juventus	2–0	3–0	UEFA Champions League
650	8 April 2018	Santiago Bernabéu, Madrid, Spain	(Spain) Real Madrid	(Spain) Atlético Madrid	1–0	1–1	La Liga
651	11 April 2018	Santiago Bernabéu, Madrid, Spain	(Spain) Real Madrid	(Italy) Juventus	1–3	1–3	UEFA Champions League
652	18 April 2018	Santiago Bernabéu, Madrid, Spain	(Spain) Real Madrid	(Spain) Athletic Bilbao	1–1	1–1	La Liga
653	6 May 2018	Camp Nou, Barcelona, Spain	(Spain) Real Madrid	(Spain) Barcelona	1–1	2–2	La Liga
654	19 May 2018	El Madrigal, Villarreal, Spain	(Spain) Real Madrid	(Spain) Villarreal	2–0	2–2	La Liga
655	15 June 2018	Fisht Olympic Stadium, Sochi, Russia	Portugal	Spain	1–0	3–3	2018 FIFA World Cup
656	15 June 2018	Fisht Olympic Stadium, Sochi, Russia	Portugal	Spain	2–1	3–3	2018 FIFA World Cup
657	15 June 2018	Fisht Olympic Stadium, Sochi, Russia	Portugal	Spain	3–3	3–3	2018 FIFA World Cup
658	20 June 2018	Luzhniki Stadium, Moscow, Russia	Portugal	Morocco	1–0	1–0	2018 FIFA World Cup
659	16 September 2018	Juventus Stadium, Turin, Italy	(Italy) Juventus	(Italy) Sassuolo	1–0	2–1	Serie A
660	16 September 2018	Juventus Stadium, Turin, Italy	(Italy) Juventus	(Italy) Sassuolo	2–0	2–1	Serie A
661	23 September 2018	Stadio Benito Stirpe, Frosinone, Italy	(Italy) Juventus	(Italy) Frosinone	1–0	2–0	Serie A
662	6 October 2018	Stadio Friuli, Udine, Italy	(Italy) Juventus	(Italy) Udinese	2–0	2–0	Serie A
663	20 October 2018	Juventus Stadium, Turin, Italy	(Italy) Juventus	(Italy) Genoa	1–0	1–1	Serie A
664	27 October 2018	Stadio Carlo Castellani, Empoli, Italy	(Italy) Juventus	(Italy) Empoli	1–1	2–1	Serie A
665	27 October 2018	Stadio Carlo Castellani, Empoli, Italy	(Italy) Juventus	(Italy) Empoli	2–1	2–1	Serie A
666	7 November 2018	Juventus Stadium, Turin, Italy	(Italy) Juventus	(England) Manchester United	1–0	1–2	UEFA Champions League
667	11 November 2018	San Siro, Milan, Italy	(Italy) Juventus	(Italy) Milan	2–0	2–0	Serie A
668	24 November 2018	Juventus Stadium, Turin, Italy	(Italy) Juventus	(Italy) SPAL	1–0	2–0	Serie A
669	1 December 2018	Stadio Artemo Franchi, Florence, Italy	(Italy) Juventus	(Italy) Fiorentina	3–0	3–0	Serie A
670	15 December 2018	Stadio Olimpico Grande Torino, Turin, Italy	(Italy) Juventus	(Italy) Torino	1–0	1–0	Serie A
671	26 December 2018	Stadio Atleti Azzurri d'Italia, Bergamo, Italy	(Italy) Juventus	(Italy) Atalanta	2–2	2–2	Serie A
672	29 December 2018	Juventus Stadium, Turin, Italy	(Italy) Juventus	(Italy) Sampdoria	1–0	2–1	Serie A
673	29 December 2018	Juventus Stadium, Turin, Italy	(Italy) Juventus	(Italy) Sampdoria	2–1	2–1	Serie A
674	16 January 2019	King Abdullah Sports City, Jeddah, Saudi Arabia	(Italy) Juventus	(Italy) Milan	1–0	1–0	Supercoppa Italiana
675	27 January 2019	Stadio Olimpico, Rome, Italy	(Italy) Juventus	(Italy) Lazio	2–1	2–1	Serie A
676	3 February 2019	Juventus Stadium, Turin, Italy	(Italy) Juventus	(Italy) Parma	1–0	3–3	Serie A
677	3 February 2019	Juventus Stadium, Turin, Italy	(Italy) Juventus	(Italy) Parma	3–1	3–3	Serie A
678	10 February 2019	Mapei Stadium, Reggio Emilia, Italy	(Italy) Juventus	(Italy) Sassuolo	2–0	3–0	Serie A
679	15 February 2019	Juventus Stadium, Turin, Italy	(Italy) Juventus	(Italy) Frosinone	3–0	3–0	Serie A
680	12 March 2019	Juventus Stadium, Turin, Italy	(Italy) Juventus	(Spain) Atlético Madrid	1–0	3–0	UEFA Champions League
681	12 March 2019	Juventus Stadium, Turin, Italy	(Italy) Juventus	(Spain) Atlético Madrid	2–0	3–0	UEFA Champions League
682	12 March 2019	Juventus Stadium, Turin, Italy	(Italy) Juventus	(Spain) Atlético Madrid	3–0	3–0	UEFA Champions League
683	10 April 2019	Johan Cruyff Arena, Amsterdam, Netherlands	(Italy) Juventus	(Netherlands) Ajax	1–0	1–1	UEFA Champions League
684	16 April 2019	Juventus Stadium, Turin, Italy	(Italy) Juventus	(Netherlands) Ajax	1–0	1–2	UEFA Champions League
685	27 April 2019	San Siro, Milan, Italy	(Italy) Juventus	(Italy) Internazionale	1–1	1–1	Serie A
686	3 May 2019	Juventus Stadium, Turin, Italy	(Italy) Juventus	(Italy) Torino	1–1	1–1	Serie A
687	5 June 2019	Estádio do Dragão, Porto, Portugal	Portugal	Switzerland	1–0	3–1	2019 UEFA Nations League Finals
688	5 June 2019	Estádio do Dragão, Porto, Portugal	Portugal	Switzerland	2–1	3–1	2019 UEFA Nations League Finals
689	5 June 2019	Estádio do Dragão, Porto, Portugal	Portugal	Switzerland	3–1	3–1	2019 UEFA Nations League Finals
690	31 August 2019	Juventus Stadium, Turin, Italy	(Italy) Juventus	(Italy) Napoli	3–0	4–3	Serie A
691	7 September 2019	Red Star Stadium, Belgrade, Serbia	Portugal	Serbia	3–1	4–2	UEFA Euro 2020 qualifying
692	10 September 2019	LFF Stadium, Vilnius, Lithuania	Portugal	Lithuania	1–0	5–1	UEFA Euro 2020 qualifying
693	10 September 2019	LFF Stadium, Vilnius, Lithuania	Portugal	Lithuania	2–1	5–1	UEFA Euro 2020 qualifying
694	10 September 2019	LFF Stadium, Vilnius, Lithuania	Portugal	Lithuania	3–1	5–1	UEFA Euro 2020 qualifying
695	10 September 2019	LFF Stadium, Vilnius, Lithuania	Portugal	Lithuania	4–1	5–1	UEFA Euro 2020 qualifying
696	21 September 2019	Juventus Stadium, Turin, Italy	(Italy) Juventus	(Italy) Hellas Verona	2–1	2–1	Serie A
697	28 September 2019	Juventus Stadium, Turin, Italy	(Italy) Juventus	(Italy) SPAL	2–0	2–0	Serie A
698	1 October 2019	Juventus Stadium, Turin, Italy	(Italy) Juventus	(Germany) Bayer Leverkusen	3–0	3–0	UEFA Champions League
699	11 October 2019	Estádio José Alvalade, Lisbon, Portugal	Portugal	Luxembourg	2–0	3–0	UEFA Euro 2020 qualifying
700	14 October 2019	Olimpiyskiy National Sports Complex, Kyiv, Ukraine	Portugal	Ukraine	1–2	1–2	UEFA Euro 2020 qualifying
701	19 October 2019	Juventus Stadium, Turin, Italy	(Italy) Juventus	(Italy) Bologna	1–0	2–1	Serie A
702	30 October 2019	Juventus Stadium, Turin, Italy	(Italy) Juventus	(Italy) Genoa	2–1	2–1	Serie A
703	14 November 2019	Estádio Algarve, Faro/Loulé, Portugal	Portugal	Lithuania	1–0	6–0	UEFA Euro 2020 qualifying
704	14 November 2019	Estádio Algarve, Faro/Loulé, Portugal	Portugal	Lithuania	2–0	6–0	UEFA Euro 2020 qualifying
705	14 November 2019	Estádio Algarve, Faro/Loulé, Portugal	Portugal	Lithuania	6–0	6–0	UEFA Euro 2020 qualifying
706	17 November 2019	Stade Josy Barthel, Luxembourg City, Luxembourg	Portugal	Luxembourg	2–0	2–0	UEFA Euro 2020 qualifying
707	1 December 2019	Juventus Stadium, Turin, Italy	(Italy) Juventus	(Italy) Sassuolo	2–2	2–2	Serie A
708	7 December 2019	Stadio Olimpico, Rome, Italy	(Italy) Juventus	(Italy) Lazio	1–0	1–3	Serie A
709	11 December 2019	BayArena, Leverkusen, Germany	(Italy) Juventus	(Germany) Bayer Leverkusen	1–0	2–0	UEFA Champions League
710	15 December 2019	Juventus Stadium, Turin, Italy	(Italy) Juventus	(Italy) Udinese	1–0	3–1	Serie A
711	15 December 2019	Juventus Stadium, Turin, Italy	(Italy) Juventus	(Italy) Udinese	2–0	3–1	Serie A
712	18 December 2019	Stadio Luigi Ferraris, Genoa, Italy	(Italy) Juventus	(Italy) Sampdoria	2–1	2–1	Serie A
713	6 January 2020	Juventus Stadium, Turin, Italy	(Italy) Juventus	(Italy) Cagliari	1–0	4–0	Serie A
714	6 January 2020	Juventus Stadium, Turin, Italy	(Italy) Juventus	(Italy) Cagliari	2–0	4–0	Serie A
715	6 January 2020	Juventus Stadium, Turin, Italy	(Italy) Juventus	(Italy) Cagliari	4–0	4–0	Serie A
716	12 January 2020	Stadio Olimpico, Rome, Italy	(Italy) Juventus	(Italy) Roma	2–0	2–1	Serie A
717	19 January 2020	Juventus Stadium, Turin, Italy	(Italy) Juventus	(Italy) Parma	1–0	2–1	Serie A
718	19 January 2020	Juventus Stadium, Turin, Italy	(Italy) Juventus	(Italy) Parma	2–1	2–1	Serie A
719	22 January 2020	Juventus Stadium, Turin, Italy	(Italy) Juventus	(Italy) Roma	1–0	3–1	Coppa Italia
720	26 January 2020	Stadio San Paolo, Naples, Italy	(Italy) Juventus	(Italy) Napoli	1–2	1–2	Serie A
721	2 February 2020	Juventus Stadium, Turin, Italy	(Italy) Juventus	(Italy) Fiorentina	1–0	3–0	Serie A
722	2 February 2020	Juventus Stadium, Turin, Italy	(Italy) Juventus	(Italy) Fiorentina	2–0	3–0	Serie A
723	8 February 2020	Stadio Marc'Antonio Bentegodi, Verona, Italy	(Italy) Juventus	(Italy) Hellas Verona	1–0	1–2	Serie A
724	13 February 2020	San Siro, Milan, Italy	(Italy) Juventus	(Italy) Milan	1–1	1–1	Coppa Italia
725	22 February 2020	Stadio Paolo Mazza, Ferrara, Italy	(Italy) Juventus	(Italy) SPAL	1–0	2–1	Serie A
726	22 June 2020	Stadio Renato Dall'Ara, Bologna, Italy	(Italy) Juventus	(Italy) Bologna	1–0	2–0	Serie A
727	26 June 2020	Juventus Stadium, Turin, Italy	(Italy) Juventus	(Italy) Lecce	2–0	4–0	Serie A
728	30 June 2020	Stadio Luigi Ferraris, Genoa, Italy	(Italy) Juventus	(Italy) Genoa	2–0	3–1	Serie A
729	4 July 2020	Juventus Stadium, Turin, Italy	(Italy) Juventus	(Italy) Torino	3–1	4–1	Serie A
730	7 July 2020	San Siro, Milan, Italy	(Italy) Juventus	(Italy) Milan	2–0	2–4	Serie A
731	11 July 2020	Juventus Stadium, Turin, Italy	(Italy) Juventus	(Italy) Atalanta	1–1	2–2	Serie A
732	11 July 2020	Juventus Stadium, Turin, Italy	(Italy) Juventus	(Italy) Atalanta	2–2	2–2	Serie A
733	20 July 2020	Juventus Stadium, Turin, Italy	(Italy) Juventus	(Italy) Lazio	1–0	2–1	Serie A
734	20 July 2020	Juventus Stadium, Turin, Italy	(Italy) Juventus	(Italy) Lazio	2–0	2–1	Serie A
735	26 July 2020	Juventus Stadium, Turin, Italy	(Italy) Juventus	(Italy) Sampdoria	1–0	2–0	Serie A
736	7 August 2020	Juventus Stadium, Turin, Italy	(Italy) Juventus	(France) Lyon	1–1	2–1	UEFA Champions League
737	7 August 2020	Juventus Stadium, Turin, Italy	(Italy) Juventus	(France) Lyon	2–1	2–1	UEFA Champions League
738	8 September 2020	Friends Arena, Solna, Sweden	Portugal	Sweden	1–0	2–0	UEFA Nations League
739	8 September 2020	Friends Arena, Solna, Sweden	Portugal	Sweden	2–0	2–0	UEFA Nations League
740	20 September 2020	Juventus Stadium, Turin, Italy	(Italy) Juventus	(Italy) Sampdoria	3–0	3–0	Serie A
741	27 September 2020	Stadio Olimpico, Rome, Italy	(Italy) Juventus	(Italy) Roma	1–1	2–2	Serie A
742	27 September 2020	Stadio Olimpico, Rome, Italy	(Italy) Juventus	(Italy) Roma	2–2	2–2	Serie A
743	1 November 2020	Stadio Alberto Picco, La Spezia, Italy	(Italy) Juventus	(Italy) Spezia	2–1	4–1	Serie A
744	1 November 2020	Stadio Alberto Picco, La Spezia, Italy	(Italy) Juventus	(Italy) Spezia	4–1	4–1	Serie A
745	8 November 2020	Stadio Olimpico, Rome, Italy	(Italy) Juventus	(Italy) Lazio	1–0	1–1	Serie A
746	11 November 2020	Estádio da Luz, Lisbon, Portugal	Portugal	Andorra	6–0	7–0	International friendly
747	21 November 2020	Juventus Stadium, Turin, Italy	(Italy) Juventus	(Italy) Cagliari	1–0	2–0	Serie A
748	21 November 2020	Juventus Stadium, Turin, Italy	(Italy) Juventus	(Italy) Cagliari	2–0	2–0	Serie A
749	24 November 2020	Juventus Stadium, Turin, Italy	(Italy) Juventus	(Hungary) Ferencváros	1–0	2–1	UEFA Champions League
750	2 December 2020	Juventus Stadium, Turin, Italy	(Italy) Juventus	(Ukraine) Dynamo Kyiv	2–0	3–0	UEFA Champions League
751	8 December 2020	Camp Nou, Barcelona, Spain	(Italy) Juventus	(Spain) Barcelona	1–0	3–0	UEFA Champions League
752	8 December 2020	Camp Nou, Barcelona, Spain	(Italy) Juventus	(Spain) Barcelona	3–0	3–0	UEFA Champions League
753	13 December 2020	Stadio Luigi Ferraris, Genoa, Italy	(Italy) Juventus	(Italy) Genoa	2–1	3–1	Serie A
754	13 December 2020	Stadio Luigi Ferraris, Genoa, Italy	(Italy) Juventus	(Italy) Genoa	3–1	3–1	Serie A
755	19 December 2020	Stadio Ennio Tardini, Parma, Italy	(Italy) Juventus	(Italy) Parma	2–0	4–0	Serie A
756	19 December 2020	Stadio Ennio Tardini, Parma, Italy	(Italy) Juventus	(Italy) Parma	3–0	4–0	Serie A
757	3 January 2021	Juventus Stadium, Turin, Italy	(Italy) Juventus	(Italy) Udinese	1–0	4–1	Serie A
758	3 January 2021	Juventus Stadium, Turin, Italy	(Italy) Juventus	(Italy) Udinese	3–0	4–1	Serie A
759	10 January 2021	Juventus Stadium, Turin, Italy	(Italy) Juventus	(Italy) Sassuolo	3–1	3–1	Serie A
760	20 January 2021	Mapei Stadium, Reggio Emilia, Italy	(Italy) Juventus	(Italy) Napoli	1–0	2–0	Supercoppa Italiana
761	2 February 2021	San Siro, Milan, Italy	(Italy) Juventus	(Italy) Internazionale	1–1	2–1	Coppa Italia
762	2 February 2021	San Siro, Milan, Italy	(Italy) Juventus	(Italy) Internazionale	2–1	2–1	Coppa Italia
763	6 February 2021	Juventus Stadium, Turin, Italy	(Italy) Juventus	(Italy) Roma	1–0	2–0	Serie A
764	22 February 2021	Juventus Stadium, Turin, Italy	(Italy) Juventus	(Italy) Crotone	1–0	3–0	Serie A
765	22 February 2021	Juventus Stadium, Turin, Italy	(Italy) Juventus	(Italy) Crotone	2–0	3–0	Serie A
766	27 February 2021	Stadio Marc'Antonio Bentegodi, Verona, Italy	(Italy) Juventus	(Italy) Hellas Verona	1–0	1–1	Serie A
767	2 March 2021	Juventus Stadium, Turin, Italy	(Italy) Juventus	(Italy) Spezia	3–0	3–0	Serie A
768	14 March 2021	Sardegna Arena, Cagliari, Italy	(Italy) Juventus	(Italy) Cagliari	1–0	3–1	Serie A
769	14 March 2021	Sardegna Arena, Cagliari, Italy	(Italy) Juventus	(Italy) Cagliari	2–0	3–1	Serie A
770	14 March 2021	Sardegna Arena, Cagliari, Italy	(Italy) Juventus	(Italy) Cagliari	3–0	3–1	Serie A
771	30 March 2021	Stade Josy Barthel, Luxembourg City, Luxembourg	Portugal	Luxembourg	2–1	3–1	2022 FIFA World Cup qualification
772	3 April 2021	Stadio Olimpico Grande Torino, Turin, Italy	(Italy) Juventus	(Italy) Torino	2–2	2–2	Serie A
773	7 April 2021	Juventus Stadium, Turin, Italy	(Italy) Juventus	(Italy) Napoli	1–0	2–1	Serie A
774	2 May 2021	Stadio Friuli, Udine, Italy	(Italy) Juventus	(Italy) Udinese	1–1	2–1	Serie A
775	2 May 2021	Stadio Friuli, Udine, Italy	(Italy) Juventus	(Italy) Udinese	2–1	2–1	Serie A
776	12 May 2021	Mapei Stadium, Reggio Emilia, Italy	(Italy) Juventus	(Italy) Sassuolo	2–0	3–1	Serie A
777	15 May 2021	Juventus Stadium, Turin, Italy	(Italy) Juventus	(Italy) Internazionale	1–0	3–2	Serie A
778	9 June 2021	Estádio José Alvalade, Lisbon, Portugal	Portugal	Israel	2–0	4–0	International friendly
779	15 June 2021	Puskás Aréna, Budapest, Hungary	Portugal	Hungary	2–0	3–0	UEFA Euro 2020
780	15 June 2021	Puskás Aréna, Budapest, Hungary	Portugal	Hungary	3–0	3–0	UEFA Euro 2020
781	19 June 2021	Allianz Arena, Munich, Germany	Portugal	Germany	1–0	2–4	UEFA Euro 2020
782	23 June 2021	Puskás Aréna, Budapest, Hungary	Portugal	France	1–0	2–2	UEFA Euro 2020
783	23 June 2021	Puskás Aréna, Budapest, Hungary	Portugal	France	2–2	2–2	UEFA Euro 2020
784	1 September 2021	Estádio Algarve, Faro/Loulé, Portugal	Portugal	Republic of Ireland	1–1	2–1	2022 FIFA World Cup qualification
785	1 September 2021	Estádio Algarve, Faro/Loulé, Portugal	Portugal	Republic of Ireland	2–1	2–1	2022 FIFA World Cup qualification
786	11 September 2021	Old Trafford, Manchester, England	(England) Manchester United	(England) Newcastle United	1–0	4–1	Premier League
787	11 September 2021	Old Trafford, Manchester, England	(England) Manchester United	(England) Newcastle United	2–1	4–1	Premier League
788	14 September 2021	Stadion Wankdorf, Bern, Switzerland	(England) Manchester United	(Switzerland) Young Boys	1–0	1–2	UEFA Champions League
789	19 September 2021	London Stadium, London, England	(England) Manchester United	(England) West Ham United	1–1	2–1	Premier League
790	29 September 2021	Old Trafford, Manchester, England	(England) Manchester United	(Spain) Villarreal	2–1	2–1	UEFA Champions League
791	9 October 2021	Estádio Algarve, Faro/Loulé, Portugal	Portugal	Qatar	1–0	3–0	International friendly
792	12 October 2021	Estádio Algarve, Faro/Loulé, Portugal	Portugal	Luxembourg	1–0	5–0	2022 FIFA World Cup qualification
793	12 October 2021	Estádio Algarve, Faro/Loulé, Portugal	Portugal	Luxembourg	2–0	5–0	2022 FIFA World Cup qualification
794	12 October 2021	Estádio Algarve, Faro/Loulé, Portugal	Portugal	Luxembourg	5–0	5–0	2022 FIFA World Cup qualification
795	20 October 2021	Old Trafford, Manchester, England	(England) Manchester United	(Italy) Atalanta	3–2	3–2	UEFA Champions League
796	30 October 2021	Tottenham Hotspur Stadium, London, England	(England) Manchester United	(England) Tottenham Hotspur	1–0	3–0	Premier League
797	2 November 2021	Gewiss Stadium, Bergamo, Italy	(England) Manchester United	(Italy) Atalanta	1–1	2–2	UEFA Champions League
798	2 November 2021	Gewiss Stadium, Bergamo, Italy	(England) Manchester United	(Italy) Atalanta	2–2	2–2	UEFA Champions League
799	23 November 2021	El Madrigal, Villarreal, Spain	(England) Manchester United	(Spain) Villarreal	1–0	2–0	UEFA Champions League
800	2 December 2021	Old Trafford, Manchester, England	(England) Manchester United	(England) Arsenal	2–1	3–2	Premier League
801	2 December 2021	Old Trafford, Manchester, England	(England) Manchester United	(England) Arsenal	3–2	3–2	Premier League
802	11 December 2021	Carrow Road, Norwich, England	(England) Manchester United	(England) Norwich City	1–0	1–0	Premier League
803	30 December 2021	Old Trafford, Manchester, England	(England) Manchester United	(England) Burnley	3–0	3–1	Premier League
804	15 February 2022	Old Trafford, Manchester, England	(England) Manchester United	(England) Brighton	1–0	2–0	Premier League
805	12 March 2022	Old Trafford, Manchester, England	(England) Manchester United	(England) Tottenham Hotspur	1–0	3–2	Premier League
806	12 March 2022	Old Trafford, Manchester, England	(England) Manchester United	(England) Tottenham Hotspur	2–1	3–2	Premier League
807	12 March 2022	Old Trafford, Manchester, England	(England) Manchester United	(England) Tottenham Hotspur	3–2	3–2	Premier League
808	16 April 2022	Old Trafford, Manchester, England	(England) Manchester United	(England) Norwich City	1–0	3–2	Premier League
809	16 April 2022	Old Trafford, Manchester, England	(England) Manchester United	(England) Norwich City	2–0	3–2	Premier League
810	16 April 2022	Old Trafford, Manchester, England	(England) Manchester United	(England) Norwich City	3–2	3–2	Premier League
811	23 April 2022	Emirates Stadium, London, England	(England) Manchester United	(England) Arsenal	1–2	1–3	Premier League
812	28 April 2022	Old Trafford, Manchester, England	(England) Manchester United	(England) Chelsea	1–1	1–1	Premier League
813	2 May 2022	Old Trafford, Manchester, England	(England) Manchester United	(England) Brentford	2–0	3–0	Premier League
814	5 June 2022	Estádio José Alvalade, Lisbon, Portugal	Portugal	Switzerland	2–0	4–0	UEFA Nations League
815	5 June 2022	Estádio José Alvalade, Lisbon, Portugal	Portugal	Switzerland	3–0	4–0	UEFA Nations League
816	15 September 2022	Zimbru Stadium, Chișinău, Moldova	(England) Manchester United	(Moldova) Sheriff Tiraspol	2–0	2–0	UEFA Europa League
817	9 October 2022	Goodison Park, Liverpool, England	(England) Manchester United	(England) Everton	2–1	2–1	Premier League
818	27 October 2022	Old Trafford, Manchester, England	(England) Manchester United	(Moldova) Sheriff Tiraspol	3–0	3–0	UEFA Europa League
819	24 November 2022	Stadium 974, Doha, Qatar	Portugal	Ghana	1–0	3–2	2022 FIFA World Cup
820	3 February 2023	Prince Abdullah bin Jalawi Stadium, Al-Hassa, Saudi Arabia	(Saudi Arabia) Al-Nassr	(Saudi Arabia) Al-Fateh	2–2	2–2	Saudi Pro League
821	9 February 2023	King Abdul Aziz Stadium, Mecca, Saudi Arabia	(Saudi Arabia) Al-Nassr	(Saudi Arabia) Al-Wehda	1–0	4–0	Saudi Pro League
822	9 February 2023	King Abdul Aziz Stadium, Mecca, Saudi Arabia	(Saudi Arabia) Al-Nassr	(Saudi Arabia) Al-Wehda	2–0	4–0	Saudi Pro League
823	9 February 2023	King Abdul Aziz Stadium, Mecca, Saudi Arabia	(Saudi Arabia) Al-Nassr	(Saudi Arabia) Al-Wehda	3–0	4–0	Saudi Pro League
824	9 February 2023	King Abdul Aziz Stadium, Mecca, Saudi Arabia	(Saudi Arabia) Al-Nassr	(Saudi Arabia) Al-Wehda	4–0	4–0	Saudi Pro League
825	25 February 2023	Prince Sultan bin Abdul Aziz Stadium, Abha, Saudi Arabia	(Saudi Arabia) Al-Nassr	(Saudi Arabia) Damac	1–0	3–0	Saudi Pro League
826	25 February 2023	Prince Sultan bin Abdul Aziz Stadium, Abha, Saudi Arabia	(Saudi Arabia) Al-Nassr	(Saudi Arabia) Damac	2–0	3–0	Saudi Pro League
827	25 February 2023	Prince Sultan bin Abdul Aziz Stadium, Abha, Saudi Arabia	(Saudi Arabia) Al-Nassr	(Saudi Arabia) Damac	3–0	3–0	Saudi Pro League
828	18 March 2023	Mrsool Park, Riyadh, Saudi Arabia	(Saudi Arabia) Al-Nassr	(Saudi Arabia) Abha	1–1	2–1	Saudi Pro League
829	23 March 2023	Estádio José Alvalade, Lisbon, Portugal	Portugal	Liechtenstein	3–0	4–0	UEFA Euro 2024 qualifying
830	23 March 2023	Estádio José Alvalade, Lisbon, Portugal	Portugal	Liechtenstein	4–0	4–0	UEFA Euro 2024 qualifying
831	26 March 2023	Stade de Luxembourg, Luxembourg City, Luxembourg	Portugal	Luxembourg	1–0	6–0	UEFA Euro 2024 qualifying
832	26 March 2023	Stade de Luxembourg, Luxembourg City, Luxembourg	Portugal	Luxembourg	4–0	6–0	UEFA Euro 2024 qualifying
833	4 April 2023	Prince Abdullah bin Jalawi Stadium, Al-Hassa, Saudi Arabia	(Saudi Arabia) Al-Nassr	(Saudi Arabia) Al-Adalah	1–0	5–0	Saudi Pro League
834	4 April 2023	Prince Abdullah bin Jalawi Stadium, Al-Hassa, Saudi Arabia	(Saudi Arabia) Al-Nassr	(Saudi Arabia) Al-Adalah	3–0	5–0	Saudi Pro League
835	28 April 2023	Mrsool Park, Riyadh, Saudi Arabia	(Saudi Arabia) Al-Nassr	(Saudi Arabia) Al-Raed	1–0	4–0	Saudi Pro League
836	16 May 2023	Prince Abdul Aziz bin Musa'ed Stadium, Ḥaʼil, Saudi Arabia	(Saudi Arabia) Al-Nassr	(Saudi Arabia) Al-Tai	1–0	2–0	Saudi Pro League
837	23 May 2023	Mrsool Park, Riyadh, Saudi Arabia	(Saudi Arabia) Al-Nassr	(Saudi Arabia) Al-Shabab	3–2	3–2	Saudi Pro League
838	20 June 2023	Laugardalsvöllur, Reykjavík, Iceland	Portugal	Iceland	1–0	1–0	UEFA Euro 2024 qualifying
839	31 July 2023	King Fahd Sports City, Taif, Saudi Arabia	(Saudi Arabia) Al-Nassr	(Tunisia) US Monastir	2–1	4–1	Arab Club Champions Cup
840	3 August 2023	King Fahd Sports City, Taif, Saudi Arabia	(Saudi Arabia) Al-Nassr	(Egypt) Zamalek	1–1	1–1	Arab Club Champions Cup
841	6 August 2023	Prince Sultan bin Abdul Aziz Stadium, Abha, Saudi Arabia	(Saudi Arabia) Al-Nassr	(Morocco) Raja CA	1–0	3–1	Arab Club Champions Cup
842	9 August 2023	Prince Sultan bin Abdul Aziz Stadium, Abha, Saudi Arabia	(Saudi Arabia) Al-Nassr	(Iraq) Al-Shorta	1–0	1–0	Arab Club Champions Cup
843	12 August 2023	King Fahd Sports City, Taif, Saudi Arabia	(Saudi Arabia) Al-Nassr	(Saudi Arabia) Al-Hilal	1–1	2–1 (a.e.t.)	Arab Club Champions Cup
844	12 August 2023	King Fahd Sports City, Taif, Saudi Arabia	(Saudi Arabia) Al-Nassr	(Saudi Arabia) Al-Hilal	2–1	2–1 (a.e.t.)	Arab Club Champions Cup
845	25 August 2023	Prince Abdullah bin Jalawi Stadium, Al-Hassa, Saudi Arabia	(Saudi Arabia) Al-Nassr	(Saudi Arabia) Al-Fateh	2–0	5–0	Saudi Pro League
846	25 August 2023	Prince Abdullah bin Jalawi Stadium, Al-Hassa, Saudi Arabia	(Saudi Arabia) Al-Nassr	(Saudi Arabia) Al-Fateh	3–0	5–0	Saudi Pro League
847	25 August 2023	Prince Abdullah bin Jalawi Stadium, Al-Hassa, Saudi Arabia	(Saudi Arabia) Al-Nassr	(Saudi Arabia) Al-Fateh	5–0	5–0	Saudi Pro League
848	29 August 2023	Al-Awwal Park, Riyadh, Saudi Arabia	(Saudi Arabia) Al-Nassr	(Saudi Arabia) Al-Shabab	1–0	4–0	Saudi Pro League
849	29 August 2023	Al-Awwal Park, Riyadh, Saudi Arabia	(Saudi Arabia) Al-Nassr	(Saudi Arabia) Al-Shabab	2–0	4–0	Saudi Pro League
850	2 September 2023	King Abdullah Sports City, Buraidah, Saudi Arabia	(Saudi Arabia) Al-Nassr	(Saudi Arabia) Al-Hazem	4–1	5–1	Saudi Pro League
851	16 September 2023	King Abdullah Sports City, Buraidah, Saudi Arabia	(Saudi Arabia) Al-Nassr	(Saudi Arabia) Al-Raed	3–0	3–1	Saudi Pro League
852	22 September 2023	Al-Awwal Park, Riyadh, Saudi Arabia	(Saudi Arabia) Al-Nassr	(Saudi Arabia) Al-Ahli	1–0	4–3	Saudi Pro League
853	22 September 2023	Al-Awwal Park, Riyadh, Saudi Arabia	(Saudi Arabia) Al-Nassr	(Saudi Arabia) Al-Ahli	4–2	4–3	Saudi Pro League
854	29 September 2023	Prince Abdul Aziz bin Musa'ed Stadium, Ḥaʼil, Saudi Arabia	(Saudi Arabia) Al-Nassr	(Saudi Arabia) Al-Tai	2–1	2–1	Saudi Pro League
855	2 October 2023	Al-Awwal Park, Riyadh, Saudi Arabia	(Saudi Arabia) Al-Nassr	(Tajikistan) Istiklol	1–1	3–1	AFC Champions League
856	13 October 2023	Estádio do Dragão, Porto, Portugal	Portugal	Slovakia	2–0	3–2	UEFA Euro 2024 qualifying
857	13 October 2023	Estádio do Dragão, Porto, Portugal	Portugal	Slovakia	3–1	3–2	UEFA Euro 2024 qualifying
858	16 October 2023	Bilino Polje Stadium, Zenica, Bosnia and Herzegovina	Portugal	Bosnia and Herzegovina	1–0	5–0	UEFA Euro 2024 qualifying
859	16 October 2023	Bilino Polje Stadium, Zenica, Bosnia and Herzegovina	Portugal	Bosnia and Herzegovina	2–0	5–0	UEFA Euro 2024 qualifying
860	21 October 2023	Al-Awwal Park, Riyadh, Saudi Arabia	(Saudi Arabia) Al-Nassr	(Saudi Arabia) Damac	2–1	2–1	Saudi Pro League
861	24 October 2023	Al-Awwal Park, Riyadh, Saudi Arabia	(Saudi Arabia) Al-Nassr	(Qatar) Al-Duhail	3–0	4–3	AFC Champions League
862	24 October 2023	Al-Awwal Park, Riyadh, Saudi Arabia	(Saudi Arabia) Al-Nassr	(Qatar) Al-Duhail	4–2	4–3	AFC Champions League
863	4 November 2023	Al-Awwal Park, Riyadh, Saudi Arabia	(Saudi Arabia) Al-Nassr	(Saudi Arabia) Al-Khaleej	1–0	2–0	Saudi Pro League
864	11 November 2023	King Abdul Aziz Stadium, Mecca, Saudi Arabia	(Saudi Arabia) Al-Nassr	(Saudi Arabia) Al-Wehda	3–0	3–1	Saudi Pro League
865	16 November 2023	Rheinpark Stadion, Vaduz, Liechtenstein	Portugal	Liechtenstein	1–0	2–0	UEFA Euro 2024 qualifying
866	24 November 2023	Al-Awwal Park, Riyadh, Saudi Arabia	(Saudi Arabia) Al-Nassr	(Saudi Arabia) Al-Okhdood	2–0	3–0	Saudi Pro League
867	24 November 2023	Al-Awwal Park, Riyadh, Saudi Arabia	(Saudi Arabia) Al-Nassr	(Saudi Arabia) Al-Okhdood	3–0	3–0	Saudi Pro League
868	8 December 2023	Al-Awwal Park, Riyadh, Saudi Arabia	(Saudi Arabia) Al-Nassr	(Saudi Arabia) Al-Riyadh	1–0	4–1	Saudi Pro League
869	11 December 2023	Al-Shabab Club Stadium, Riyadh, Saudi Arabia	(Saudi Arabia) Al-Nassr	(Saudi Arabia) Al-Shabab	4–1	5–2	King's Cup
870	22 December 2023	Al-Awwal Park, Riyadh, Saudi Arabia	(Saudi Arabia) Al-Nassr	(Saudi Arabia) Al-Ettifaq	3–0	3–1	Saudi Pro League
871	26 December 2023	Prince Abdullah Al-Faisal Sports City, Jeddah, Saudi Arabia	(Saudi Arabia) Al-Nassr	(Saudi Arabia) Al-Ittihad	1–1	5–2	Saudi Pro League
872	26 December 2023	Prince Abdullah Al-Faisal Sports City, Jeddah, Saudi Arabia	(Saudi Arabia) Al-Nassr	(Saudi Arabia) Al-Ittihad	3–2	5–2	Saudi Pro League
873	30 December 2023	King Abdullah Sports City, Buraidah, Saudi Arabia	(Saudi Arabia) Al-Nassr	(Saudi Arabia) Al-Taawoun	4–1	4–1	Saudi Pro League
874	14 February 2024	Prince Faisal bin Fahd Sports City, Riyadh, Saudi Arabia	(Saudi Arabia) Al-Nassr	(Saudi Arabia) Al-Fayha	1–0	1–0	AFC Champions League
875	17 February 2024	Al-Awwal Park, Riyadh, Saudi Arabia	(Saudi Arabia) Al-Nassr	(Saudi Arabia) Al-Fateh	1–0	2–1	Saudi Pro League
876	21 February 2024	Al-Awwal Park, Riyadh, Saudi Arabia	(Saudi Arabia) Al-Nassr	(Saudi Arabia) Al-Fayha	2–0	2–0	AFC Champions League
877	25 February 2024	Al-Shabab Club Stadium, Riyadh, Saudi Arabia	(Saudi Arabia) Al-Nassr	(Saudi Arabia) Al-Shabab	1–0	3–2	Saudi Pro League
878	11 March 2024	Al-Awwal Park, Riyadh, Saudi Arabia	(Saudi Arabia) Al-Nassr	(United Arab Emirates) Al Ain	4–3	4–3	AFC Champions League
879	15 March 2024	King Abdullah Sports City, Jeddah, Saudi Arabia	(Saudi Arabia) Al-Nassr	(Saudi Arabia) Al-Ahli	1–0	1–0	Saudi Pro League
880	30 March 2024	Al-Awwal Park, Riyadh, Saudi Arabia	(Saudi Arabia) Al-Nassr	(Saudi Arabia) Al-Tai	3–1	5–1	Saudi Pro League
881	30 March 2024	Al-Awwal Park, Riyadh, Saudi Arabia	(Saudi Arabia) Al-Nassr	(Saudi Arabia) Al-Tai	4–1	5–1	Saudi Pro League
882	30 March 2024	Al-Awwal Park, Riyadh, Saudi Arabia	(Saudi Arabia) Al-Nassr	(Saudi Arabia) Al-Tai	5–1	5–1	Saudi Pro League
883	2 April 2024	Prince Sultan bin Abdulaziz Sports City, Abha, Saudi Arabia	(Saudi Arabia) Al-Nassr	(Saudi Arabia) Abha	1–0	8–0	Saudi Pro League
884	2 April 2024	Prince Sultan bin Abdulaziz Sports City, Abha, Saudi Arabia	(Saudi Arabia) Al-Nassr	(Saudi Arabia) Abha	2–0	8–0	Saudi Pro League
885	2 April 2024	Prince Sultan bin Abdulaziz Sports City, Abha, Saudi Arabia	(Saudi Arabia) Al-Nassr	(Saudi Arabia) Abha	4–0	8–0	Saudi Pro League
886	1 May 2024	Al-Awwal Park, Riyadh, Saudi Arabia	(Saudi Arabia) Al-Nassr	(Saudi Arabia) Al-Khaleej	1–0	3–1	King's Cup
887	1 May 2024	Al-Awwal Park, Riyadh, Saudi Arabia	(Saudi Arabia) Al-Nassr	(Saudi Arabia) Al-Khaleej	3–0	3–1	King's Cup
888	4 May 2024	Al-Awwal Park, Riyadh, Saudi Arabia	(Saudi Arabia) Al-Nassr	(Saudi Arabia) Al-Wehda	1–0	6–0	Saudi Pro League
889	4 May 2024	Al-Awwal Park, Riyadh, Saudi Arabia	(Saudi Arabia) Al-Nassr	(Saudi Arabia) Al-Wehda	2–0	6–0	Saudi Pro League
890	4 May 2024	Al-Awwal Park, Riyadh, Saudi Arabia	(Saudi Arabia) Al-Nassr	(Saudi Arabia) Al-Wehda	5–0	6–0	Saudi Pro League
891	9 May 2024	Prince Hathloul bin Abdulaziz Sports City, Najran, Saudi Arabia	(Saudi Arabia) Al-Nassr	(Saudi Arabia) Al-Okhdood	2–0	3–2	Saudi Pro League
892	27 May 2024	Al-Awwal Park, Riyadh, Saudi Arabia	(Saudi Arabia) Al-Nassr	(Saudi Arabia) Al-Ittihad	1–0	4–2	Saudi Pro League
893	27 May 2024	Al-Awwal Park, Riyadh, Saudi Arabia	(Saudi Arabia) Al-Nassr	(Saudi Arabia) Al-Ittihad	2–0	4–2	Saudi Pro League
894	11 June 2024	Estádio Municipal de Aveiro, Aveiro, Portugal	Portugal	Republic of Ireland	2–0	3–0	International friendly
895	11 June 2024	Estádio Municipal de Aveiro, Aveiro, Portugal	Portugal	Republic of Ireland	3–0	3–0	International friendly
896	14 August 2024	Prince Sultan bin Abdulaziz Sports City, Abha, Saudi Arabia	(Saudi Arabia) Al-Nassr	(Saudi Arabia) Al-Taawoun	2–0	2–0	Saudi Super Cup
897	17 August 2024	Prince Sultan bin Abdulaziz Sports City, Abha, Saudi Arabia	(Saudi Arabia) Al-Nassr	(Saudi Arabia) Al-Hilal	1–0	1–4	Saudi Super Cup
898	22 August 2024	Al-Awwal Park, Riyadh, Saudi Arabia	(Saudi Arabia) Al-Nassr	(Saudi Arabia) Al-Raed	1–0	1–1	Saudi Pro League
899	27 August 2024	King Abdullah Sports City, Buraidah, Saudi Arabia	(Saudi Arabia) Al-Nassr	(Saudi Arabia) Al-Fayha	2–0	4–1	Saudi Pro League
900	5 September 2024	Estádio da Luz, Lisbon, Portugal	Portugal	Croatia	2–0	2–1	UEFA Nations League
901	8 September 2024	Estádio da Luz, Lisbon, Portugal	Portugal	Scotland	2–1	2–1	UEFA Nations League
902	20 September 2024	Al-Ettifaq Club Stadium, Dammam, Saudi Arabia	(Saudi Arabia) Al-Nassr	(Saudi Arabia) Al-Ettifaq	1–0	3–0	Saudi Pro League
903	27 September 2024	Al-Awwal Park, Riyadh, Saudi Arabia	(Saudi Arabia) Al-Nassr	(Saudi Arabia) Al-Wehda	2–0	2–0	Saudi Pro League
904	30 September 2024	Al-Awwal Park, Riyadh, Saudi Arabia	(Saudi Arabia) Al-Nassr	(Qatar) Al-Rayyan	2–0	2–1	AFC Champions League Elite
905	5 October 2024	Al-Awwal Park, Riyadh, Saudi Arabia	(Saudi Arabia) Al-Nassr	(Saudi Arabia) Al-Orobah	1–0	3–0	Saudi Pro League
906	12 October 2024	Kazimierz Górski National Stadium, Warsaw, Poland	Portugal	Poland	2–0	3–1	UEFA Nations League
907	18 October 2024	Al-Shabab Club Stadium, Riyadh, Saudi Arabia	(Saudi Arabia) Al-Nassr	(Saudi Arabia) Al-Shabab	2–1	2–1	Saudi Pro League
908	5 November 2024	Al-Awwal Park, Riyadh, Saudi Arabia	(Saudi Arabia) Al-Nassr	(United Arab Emirates) Al Ain	2–0	5–1	AFC Champions League Elite
909	15 November 2024	Estádio do Dragão, Porto, Portugal	Portugal	Poland	2–0	5–1	UEFA Nations League
910	15 November 2024	Estádio do Dragão, Porto, Portugal	Portugal	Poland	5–0	5–1	UEFA Nations League
911	22 November 2024	Al-Awwal Park, Riyadh, Saudi Arabia	(Saudi Arabia) Al-Nassr	(Saudi Arabia) Al-Qadsiah	1–0	1–2	Saudi Pro League
912	25 November 2024	Al Bayt Stadium, Al Khor, Qatar	(Saudi Arabia) Al-Nassr	(Qatar) Al-Gharafa	1–0	3–1	AFC Champions League Elite
913	25 November 2024	Al Bayt Stadium, Al Khor, Qatar	(Saudi Arabia) Al-Nassr	(Qatar) Al-Gharafa	3–0	3–1	AFC Champions League Elite
914	29 November 2024	Al-Awwal Park, Riyadh, Saudi Arabia	(Saudi Arabia) Al-Nassr	(Saudi Arabia) Damac	1–0	2–0	Saudi Pro League
915	29 November 2024	Al-Awwal Park, Riyadh, Saudi Arabia	(Saudi Arabia) Al-Nassr	(Saudi Arabia) Damac	2–0	2–0	Saudi Pro League
916	6 December 2024	King Abdullah Sports City, Jeddah, Saudi Arabia	(Saudi Arabia) Al-Nassr	(Saudi Arabia) Al-Ittihad	1–1	1–2	Saudi Pro League
917	9 January 2025	Al-Awwal Park, Riyadh, Saudi Arabia	(Saudi Arabia) Al-Nassr	(Saudi Arabia) Al-Okhdood	2–1	3–1	Saudi Pro League
918	21 January 2025	Prince Mohamed bin Fahd Stadium, Dammam, Saudi Arabia	(Saudi Arabia) Al-Nassr	(Saudi Arabia) Al-Khaleej	1–0	3–1	Saudi Pro League
919	21 January 2025	Prince Mohamed bin Fahd Stadium, Dammam, Saudi Arabia	(Saudi Arabia) Al-Nassr	(Saudi Arabia) Al-Khaleej	3–1	3–1	Saudi Pro League
920	26 January 2025	Al-Awwal Park, Riyadh, Saudi Arabia	(Saudi Arabia) Al-Nassr	(Saudi Arabia) Al-Fateh	3–1	3–1	Saudi Pro League
921	30 January 2025	King Abdullah Sports City, Buraidah, Saudi Arabia	(Saudi Arabia) Al-Nassr	(Saudi Arabia) Al-Raed	1–0	2–1	Saudi Pro League
922	3 February 2025	Al-Awwal Park, Riyadh, Saudi Arabia	(Saudi Arabia) Al-Nassr	(United Arab Emirates) Al Wasl	2–0	4–0	AFC Champions League Elite
923	3 February 2025	Al-Awwal Park, Riyadh, Saudi Arabia	(Saudi Arabia) Al-Nassr	(United Arab Emirates) Al Wasl	3–0	4–0	AFC Champions League Elite
924	7 February 2025	Al-Awwal Park, Riyadh, Saudi Arabia	(Saudi Arabia) Al-Nassr	(Saudi Arabia) Al-Fayha	3–0	3–0	Saudi Pro League
925	25 February 2025	King Abdulaziz Sports City, Mecca, Saudi Arabia	(Saudi Arabia) Al-Nassr	(Saudi Arabia) Al-Wehda	1–0	2–0	Saudi Pro League
926	7 March 2025	Al-Awwal Park, Riyadh, Saudi Arabia	(Saudi Arabia) Al-Nassr	(Saudi Arabia) Al-Shabab	2–1	2–2	Saudi Pro League
927	10 March 2025	Al-Awwal Park, Riyadh, Saudi Arabia	(Saudi Arabia) Al-Nassr	(Iran) Esteghlal	2–0	3–0	AFC Champions League Elite
928	14 March 2025	Al-Awwal Park, Riyadh, Saudi Arabia	(Saudi Arabia) Al-Nassr	(Saudi Arabia) Al-Kholood	1–0	3–1	Saudi Pro League
929	23 March 2025	Estádio José Alvalade, Lisbon, Portugal	Portugal	Denmark	2–1	5–2	UEFA Nations League
930	4 April 2025	Kingdom Arena, Riyadh, Saudi Arabia	(Saudi Arabia) Al-Nassr	(Saudi Arabia) Al-Hilal	2–0	3–1	Saudi Pro League
931	4 April 2025	Kingdom Arena, Riyadh, Saudi Arabia	(Saudi Arabia) Al-Nassr	(Saudi Arabia) Al-Hilal	3–1	3–1	Saudi Pro League
932	12 April 2025	Al-Awwal Park, Riyadh, Saudi Arabia	(Saudi Arabia) Al-Nassr	(Saudi Arabia) Al-Riyadh	1–1	2–1	Saudi Pro League
933	12 April 2025	Al-Awwal Park, Riyadh, Saudi Arabia	(Saudi Arabia) Al-Nassr	(Saudi Arabia) Al-Riyadh	2–1	2–1	Saudi Pro League
934	26 April 2025	Prince Abdullah Al-Faisal Sports City, Jeddah, Saudi Arabia	(Saudi Arabia) Al-Nassr	(Japan) Yokohama F. Marinos	3–0	4–1	AFC Champions League Elite
935	21 May 2025	Al-Awwal Park, Riyadh, Saudi Arabia	(Saudi Arabia) Al-Nassr	(Saudi Arabia) Al-Khaleej	2–0	2–0	Saudi Pro League
936	26 May 2025	Al-Fateh Stadium, Al-Mubarraz, Saudi Arabia	(Saudi Arabia) Al-Nassr	(Saudi Arabia) Al-Fateh	1–0	2–3	Saudi Pro League
937	4 June 2025	Allianz Arena, Munich, Germany	Portugal	Germany	2–1	2–1	2025 UEFA Nations League Finals
938	8 June 2025	Allianz Arena, Munich, Germany	Portugal	Spain	2–2	2–2 (a.e.t.) (5–3 p)	2025 UEFA Nations League Finals
939	23 August 2025	Hong Kong Stadium, Hong Kong	(Saudi Arabia) Al-Nassr	(Saudi Arabia) Al-Ahli	1–0	2–2 (3–5 p)	Saudi Super Cup
940	29 August 2025	King Abdullah Sports City, Buraidah, Saudi Arabia	(Saudi Arabia) Al-Nassr	(Saudi Arabia) Al-Taawoun	2–0	5–0	Saudi Pro League
941	6 September 2025	Vazgen Sargsyan Republican Stadium, Yerevan, Armenia	Portugal	Armenia	2–0	5–0	2026 FIFA World Cup qualification
942	6 September 2025	Vazgen Sargsyan Republican Stadium, Yerevan, Armenia	Portugal	Armenia	4–0	5–0	2026 FIFA World Cup qualification
943	9 September 2025	Puskás Aréna, Budapest, Hungary	Portugal	Hungary	2–1	3–2	2026 FIFA World Cup qualification
944	20 September 2025	Al-Awwal Park, Riyadh, Saudi Arabia	(Saudi Arabia) Al-Nassr	(Saudi Arabia) Al-Riyadh	3–0	5–1	Saudi Pro League
945	20 September 2025	Al-Awwal Park, Riyadh, Saudi Arabia	(Saudi Arabia) Al-Nassr	(Saudi Arabia) Al-Riyadh	5–1	5–1	Saudi Pro League
946	26 September 2025	King Abdullah Sports City Stadium, Jeddah, Saudi Arabia	(Saudi Arabia) Al-Nassr	(Saudi Arabia) Al-Ittihad	2–0	2–0	Saudi Pro League
947	14 October 2025	Estádio José Alvalade, Lisbon, Portugal	Portugal	Hungary	1–1	2–2	2026 FIFA World Cup qualification
948	14 October 2025	Estádio José Alvalade, Lisbon, Portugal	Portugal	Hungary	2–1	2–2	2026 FIFA World Cup qualification
949	18 October 2025	Al-Awwal Park, Riyadh, Saudi Arabia	(Saudi Arabia) Al-Nassr	(Saudi Arabia) Al-Fateh	2–1	5–1	Saudi Pro League
950	25 October 2025	King Abdullah Sports City, Buraidah, Saudi Arabia	(Saudi Arabia) Al-Nassr	(Saudi Arabia) Al-Hazem	2–0	2–0	Saudi Pro League
951	1 November 2025	Al-Awwal Park, Riyadh, Saudi Arabia	(Saudi Arabia) Al-Nassr	(Saudi Arabia) Al-Fayha	1–1	2–1	Saudi Pro League
952	1 November 2025	Al-Awwal Park, Riyadh, Saudi Arabia	(Saudi Arabia) Al-Nassr	(Saudi Arabia) Al-Fayha	2–1	2–1	Saudi Pro League
953	8 November 2025	King Khalid Sports City Stadium, Tabuk, Saudi Arabia	(Saudi Arabia) Al-Nassr	(Saudi Arabia) Neom	2–0	3–1	Saudi Pro League
954	23 November 2025	Al-Awwal Park, Riyadh, Saudi Arabia	(Saudi Arabia) Al-Nassr	(Saudi Arabia) Al-Khaleej	4–1	4–1	Saudi Pro League
955	27 December 2025	Al-Awwal Park, Riyadh, Saudi Arabia	(Saudi Arabia) Al-Nassr	(Saudi Arabia) Al-Okhdood	1–0	3–0	Saudi Pro League
956	27 December 2025	Al-Awwal Park, Riyadh, Saudi Arabia	(Saudi Arabia) Al-Nassr	(Saudi Arabia) Al-Okhdood	2–0	3–0	Saudi Pro League
957	30 December 2025	Al-Ettifaq Club Stadium, Dammam, Saudi Arabia	(Saudi Arabia) Al-Nassr	(Saudi Arabia) Al-Ettifaq	2–1	2–2	Saudi Pro League
958	8 January 2026	Al-Awwal Park, Riyadh, Saudi Arabia	(Saudi Arabia) Al-Nassr	(Saudi Arabia) Al-Qadsiah	1–2	1–2	Saudi Pro League
959	12 January 2026	Kingdom Arena, Riyadh, Saudi Arabia	(Saudi Arabia) Al-Nassr	(Saudi Arabia) Al-Hilal	1–0	1–3	Saudi Pro League
960	21 January 2026	Prince Sultan bin Abdulaziz Sports City Stadium, Abha, Saudi Arabia	(Saudi Arabia) Al-Nassr	(Saudi Arabia) Damac	2–0	2–1	Saudi Pro League
961	30 January 2026	King Abdullah Sports City, Buraydah, Saudi Arabia	(Saudi Arabia) Al-Nassr	(Saudi Arabia) Al-Kholood	1–0	3–0	Saudi Pro League
962	14 February 2026	Al-Fateh Stadium, Al-Mubarraz, Saudi Arabia	(Saudi Arabia) Al-Nassr	(Saudi Arabia) Al-Fateh	1–0	2–0	Saudi Pro League
963	21 February 2026	Al-Awwal Park, Riyadh, Saudi Arabia	(Saudi Arabia) Al-Nassr	(Saudi Arabia) Al-Hazem	1–0	4–0	Saudi Pro League
964	21 February 2026	Al-Awwal Park, Riyadh, Saudi Arabia	(Saudi Arabia) Al-Nassr	(Saudi Arabia) Al-Hazem	4–0	4–0	Saudi Pro League
965	25 February 2026	Al-Najma Club Stadium, Unaizah, Saudi Arabia	(Saudi Arabia) Al-Nassr	(Saudi Arabia) Al-Najma	1–0	5–0	Saudi Pro League
966	3 April 2026	Al-Awwal Park, Riyadh, Saudi Arabia	(Saudi Arabia) Al-Nassr	(Saudi Arabia) Al-Najma	3–2	5–2	Saudi Pro League
967	3 April 2026	Al-Awwal Park, Riyadh, Saudi Arabia	(Saudi Arabia) Al-Nassr	(Saudi Arabia) Al-Najma	4–2	5–2	Saudi Pro League
968	11 April 2026	Prince Hathloul bin Abdulaziz Sports City Stadium, Najran, Saudi Arabia	(Saudi Arabia) Al-Nassr	(Saudi Arabia) Al-Okhdood	1–0	2–0	Saudi Pro League
969	19 April 2026	Zabeel Stadium, Dubai, United Arab Emirates	(Saudi Arabia) Al-Nassr	(United Arab Emirates) Al Wasl	1–0	4–0	AFC Champions League Two
970	29 April 2026	Al-Awwal Park, Riyadh, Saudi Arabia	(Saudi Arabia) Al-Nassr	(Saudi Arabia) Al-Ahli	1–0	2–0	Saudi Pro League
971	7 May 2026	Al-Shabab Club Stadium, Riyadh, Saudi Arabia	(Saudi Arabia) Al-Nassr	(Saudi Arabia) Al-Shabab	3–1	4–2	Saudi Pro League
972	21 May 2026	Al-Awwal Park, Riyadh, Saudi Arabia	(Saudi Arabia) Al-Nassr	(Saudi Arabia) Damac	3–1	4–1	Saudi Pro League
973	21 May 2026	Al-Awwal Park, Riyadh, Saudi Arabia	(Saudi Arabia) Al-Nassr	(Saudi Arabia) Damac	4–1	4–1	Saudi Pro League
974	23 June 2026	Houston Stadium, Houston, United States	Portugal	Uzbekistan	1–0	5–0	2026 FIFA World Cup
975	23 June 2026	Houston Stadium, Houston, United States	Portugal	Uzbekistan	3–0	5–0	2026 FIFA World Cup
976	2 July 2026	Toronto Stadium, Toronto, Canada	Portugal	Croatia	1–1	2–1	2026 FIFA World Cup
977	21 August 2026	Prince Faisal bin Fahd Sports City Stadium, Riyadh, Saudi Arabia	(Saudi Arabia) Al-Nassr	(Saudi Arabia) Al-Riyadh	4–0	4–0	Saudi Pro League
978	28 August 2026	Al-Awwal Park, Riyadh, Saudi Arabia	(Saudi Arabia) Al-Nassr	(Saudi Arabia) Al-Taawoun	2–1	2–1	Saudi Pro League
979	9 September 2026	Al-Awwal Park, Riyadh, Saudi Arabia	(Saudi Arabia) Al-Nassr	(Saudi Arabia) Abha	1–0	2–1	Saudi Pro League
980	9 October 2026	Al-Awwal Park, Riyadh, Saudi Arabia	(Saudi Arabia) Al-Nassr	(Saudi Arabia) Diriyah	1–0	3–0	Saudi Pro League
981	12 October 2026	Al-Awwal Park, Riyadh, Saudi Arabia	(Saudi Arabia) Al-Nassr	(Uzbekistan) Neftchi	2–0	3–1	AFC Champions League Elite
982	23 October 2026	Majmaah Sports City Stadium, Majmaah, Saudi Arabia	(Saudi Arabia) Al-Nassr	(Saudi Arabia) Al-Faisaly	2–0	3–1	Saudi Pro League
983	29 October 2026	Al-Awwal Park, Riyadh, Saudi Arabia	(Saudi Arabia) Al-Nassr	(Saudi Arabia) Al-Kholood	3–2	5–3	Saudi Pro League
984	29 October 2026	Al-Awwal Park, Riyadh, Saudi Arabia	(Saudi Arabia) Al-Nassr	(Saudi Arabia) Al-Kholood	4–2	5–3	Saudi Pro League
985	29 October 2026	Al-Awwal Park, Riyadh, Saudi Arabia	(Saudi Arabia) Al-Nassr	(Saudi Arabia) Al-Kholood	5–2	5–3	Saudi Pro League
986	20 November 2026	King Abdullah Sports City Stadium, Jeddah, Saudi Arabia	(Saudi Arabia) Al-Nassr	(Saudi Arabia) Al-Ahli	1–0	1–3	Saudi Pro League
