= 2012–13 in German football =

Football in Germany
- Season: 2012–13

Men's football
- Bundesliga: Bayern Munich
- 2. Bundesliga: Hertha BSC
- 3. Liga: Karlsruher SC
- DFB-Pokal: Bayern Munich
- DFL-Supercup: Bayern Munich

Women's football
- Frauen-Bundesliga: VfL Wolfsburg
- DFB-Pokal: VfL Wolfsburg

The 2012–13 season is the 103rd season of competitive football in Germany.

== Promotion and relegation ==
=== Pre Season ===
League	Promoted to League	Relegated from League
Bundesliga	SpVgg Greuther Fürth; Eintracht Frankfurt; Fortuna Düsseldorf	1. FC Köln; 1. FC Kaiserslautern; Hertha BSC
2. Bundesliga	SV Sandhausen; VfR Aalen; SSV Jahn Regensburg	Alemannia Aachen; Hansa Rostock; Karlsruher SC
3. Liga	Borussia Dortmund II; Stuttgarter Kickers; Hallescher FC	Rot-Weiß Oberhausen; FC Carl Zeiss Jena; SV Werder Bremen II
Bundesliga (women)	VfL Sindelfingen; FSV Gütersloh 2009	Hamburger SV (women); 1. FC Lokomotive Leipzig (women)
2. Bundesliga (women)	Blau-Weiß Hohen Neuendorf; Holstein Kiel; SC Sand; SV Bardenbach; 1. FFC Recklinghausen	Mellendorfer TV; FCR 2001 Duisburg; FV Löchgau; Borussia Mönchengladbach

=== Post Season ===
League	Promoted to League	Relegated from League
Bundesliga	Hertha BSC; Eintracht Braunschweig	SpVgg Greuther Fürth; Fortuna Düsseldorf
2. Bundesliga	Karlsruher SC; Arminia Bielefeld	MSV Duisburg; SSV Jahn Regensburg
3. Liga	RB Leipzig; SV Elversberg; Holstein Kiel	Kickers Offenbach; SV Babelsberg 03; Alemannia Aachen
Bundesliga (women)	BV Cloppenburg (women); TSG 1899 Hoffenheim	SC 07 Bad Neuenahr; FSV Gütersloh 2009
2. Bundesliga (women)	FC Viktoria 1889 Berlin; VfL Bochum; SV 67 Weinberg; TuS Wörrstadt; Wolfsburg II	Holstein Kiel; FFC Oldesloe; 1. FFC Recklinghausen; SV RW Bardenbach; Bad Neuenahr II

== National teams ==
=== Germany national football team ===
==== 2014 FIFA World Cup qualification ====
Pos	Team	Pld	W	D	L	GF	GA	GD	Pts	Qualification	Germany national football team	Sweden men's national football team	Austria national football team	Republic of Ireland national football team	Kazakhstan national football team	Faroe Islands national football team
1	Germany	10	9	1	0	36	10	+26	28	Qualification to 2014 FIFA World Cup	—	4–4	3–0	3–0	4–1	3–0
2	Sweden	10	6	2	2	19	14	+5	20	Advance to second round	3–5	—	2–1	0–0	2–0	2–0
3	Austria	10	5	2	3	20	10	+10	17		1–2	2–1	—	1–0	4–0	6–0
4	Republic of Ireland	10	4	2	4	16	17	−1	14		1–6	1–2	2–2	—	3–1	3–0
5	Kazakhstan	10	1	2	7	6	21	−15	5		0–3	0–1	0–0	1–2	—	2–1
6	Faroe Islands	10	0	1	9	4	29	−25	1		0–3	1–2	0–3	1–4	1–1	—

7 September 2012 Group C Match 1	Germany	3–0	Faroe Islands	Hanover, Germany
20:45	Götze 28'; Lahm (yellow card) 42'; Özil 54', 72'	Report	Baldvinsson (yellow card) 4'	Stadium: AWD-Arena; Attendance: 32,769; Referee: (Scotland) Bobby Madden; Assistant referees: (Scotland) William Conquer (Scotland) Alan Mulvanny; Fourth official: (Northern Ireland) Arnold Hunter

11 September 2012 Group C Match 2	Austria	1–2	Germany	Vienna, Austria
20:30	Prödl (yellow card) 18'; Junuzović 57'; Fuchs (yellow card) 60'; Baumgartlinger (yellow card) 81'	Report	Reus 44'; Özil 52' (pen.); Lahm (yellow card) 71'	Stadium: Ernst-Happel-Stadion; Attendance: 47,000; Referee: (Netherlands) Bjorn Kuipers; Assistant referees: (Netherlands) Sander van Roekel (Netherlands) Erwin Zeinstra; Fourth official: (Netherlands) Richard Liesveld

12 October 2012 Group C Match 3	Republic of Ireland	1–6	Germany	Dublin, Republic of Ireland
19:45	O'Dea (yellow card) 47'; Long (yellow card) 78'; Keogh 90+2'	Report	Reus (yellow card) 30' (goal) 32', 40'; Özil 55' (pen.); Klose 58'; Kroos 61', 83'; Badstuber (yellow card) 87'	Stadium: Aviva Stadium; Attendance: 51,151; Referee: (Italy) Nicola Rizzoli; Assistant referees: (Italy) Renato Faverani (Italy) Andrea Stefani; Fourth official: (Italy) Luca Banti

16 October 2012 Group C Match 4	Germany	4–4	Sweden	Berlin, Germany
20:45	Klose 8', 15'; Mertesacker 39'; Özil 56'; Reus (yellow card) 83'; Lahm (yellow card) 89'; Schweinsteiger (yellow card) 90+2'	Report	Isaksson (yellow card) 39'; Ibrahimović 62'; Lustig 64'; Elmander 76'; Elm 90+3'	Stadium: Olympiastadion; Attendance: 72,369; Referee: (Portugal) Pedro Proença; Assistant referees: (Portugal) Tiago Garcias Trigo Bolinhas (Portugal) Bertino Cunha Miranda; Fourth official: (Portugal) Duarte Gomes

22 March 2013 Group C Match 5	Kazakhstan	0–3	Germany	Astana, Kazakhstan
			Schweinsteiger 20'; Götze 22'; Müller 73'	Stadium: Astana Arena; Attendance: 29,300; Referee: (Greece) Anastassios Kakos

26 March 2013 Group C Match 6	Germany	4–1	Kazakhstan	Nuremberg, Germany
	Reus 23', 90'; Götze 27'; Gündoğan 32'		Schmidtgal 46'	Stadium: Frankenstadion; Attendance: 43,500; Referee: (Turkey) Halis Özkahya

==== Friendlies ====
15 August 2012	Germany	1–3	Argentina	Frankfurt, Germany
20:45 CEST	Zieler (red card) 30'; Höwedes 82'	Report	Zabaleta (yellow card) 26'; Messi (penalty missed) 32' 52'; Khedira 45' (o.g.); Di María 73'	Stadium: Commerzbank-Arena; Attendance: 48,808; Referee: Jonas Eriksson (Sweden)

14 November 2012	Netherlands	0–0	Germany	Amsterdam, Netherlands
20:45 CEST		Report		Stadium: Amsterdam ArenA; Attendance: 51,000; Referee: Pedro Proença (Portugal)

6 February 2013	France	1–2	Germany	Saint-Denis
21:00	Valbuena 44'	Summary	Müller 51'; Khedira 74'	Stadium: Stade de France; Attendance: 75,000; Referee: (Italy) Paolo Mazzoleni

2 June 2013	United States	4–3	Germany	Washington, D.C.
14:30 EDT	Altidore 13' ter Stegen 16' (o.g.); Dempsey 60', 64'	Report	Westermann 52'; Kruse 79'; Draxler 81'	Stadium: RFK Stadium; Attendance: 47,359; Referee: Paúl Enrique Delgadillo (Mexico)

=== Germany women's national football team ===
==== UEFA Women's Euro 2013 qualifying ====
15 September 2012	Kazakhstan	0–7	Germany	Karaganda, Kazakhstan
15:00		report	8', 42' Okoyino da Mbabi; 33' Odebrecht; 55' Mittag; 63' Schmidt; 86' Müller; 87' Goessling	Stadium: Shakhtyor Stadium; Attendance: 250; Referee: Monica Larsen (Norway)

19 September 2012	Germany	10–0	Turkey	Duisburg, Germany
17:00	Okoyino da Mbabi 17', 74'; Mittag 23'; Laudehr 45+1' (pen.); Behringer 52', 60' (pen.); Müller 72', 86', 90+2'; Bajramaj 85'	report		Stadium: MSV-Arena; Attendance: 6,467; Referee: Natalija Awdontschenko (Russia)

==== 2013 Algarve Cup ====
6 March 2013 Group A match 1	Denmark	0–0	Germany	Albufeira, Portugal
17:00 WET		Report		Stadium: Municipal Stadium; Referee: Efthalia Mitsi (Greece)

8 March 2013 Group A match 2	Germany	2–1	Japan	Parchal, Portugal
12:15 WET	Faißt 7'; Marozsán 55'	Report	Tanaka 18' (yellow card) 44'	Stadium: Stadium Bela Vista; Referee: Margaret Domka (United States)

11 March 2013 Group A match 3	Germany	2–0	Norway	Lagos, Portugal
12:20 WET	Okoyino da Mbabi 52'; Keßler 86'	Report	Christensen (yellow card) 84'	Stadium: Municipal Stadium; Referee: Salomé di Iorio (Argentina)

13 March 2013 Final	Germany	0–2	United States	Algarve, Portugal
17:00 WET		Report	Morgan 13', 34'; Leroux (yellow card) 83'	Stadium: Estádio Algarve; Referee: Carol Anne Chenard (Canada)

==== Friendlies ====
20 October 2012	United States	1–1	Germany	Bridgeview, Illinois
18:06 CDT	Wambach 2'	Report	Mittag 14'	Stadium: Toyota Park; Attendance: 19,522; Referee: Margaret Domka (United States)

23 October 2012	United States	2–2	Germany	East Hartford, Connecticut
19:30 EDT	Wambach 44'; Heath 67'; Mitts (yellow card) 74'	Report	Marozsán 48', 85'; Goeßling (yellow card) 55'	Stadium: Rentschler Field; Attendance: 18,870; Referee: Carol Anne Chenard (Canada)

29 November 2012	Germany	1–1	France	Halle
15:15 CET	Faißt 2'	Report	Franco 23'	Stadium: Erdgas Sportpark; Attendance: 5,123; Referee: Haikkinen (Finland)

13 February 2013	France	3–3	Germany	Strasbourg, France
18:30 CET	Nécib 14', 22'; Delie 53'	Report	Schmidt 12'; Keßler 66', 81'	Stadium: Stade de la Meinau; Attendance: 15,888; Referee: Pernilla Larsson (Sweden)

5 April 2013	Germany	3–3	United States	Offenbach
18:15 CEST	Kulig 63'; Okoyino da Mbabi 85'; Mittag 86'	Report	Wambach 47'; Rapinoe 55'; Morgan 71'	Stadium: Sparda Bank Hessen Stadium; Attendance: 16,090; Referee: Christina Pederson (Norway)

15 June 2013	Germany	3–0	Scotland	Essen
15:30 CEST	Goeßling 34'; Okoyino da Mbabi 44', 45'	Report		Stadium: Stadion Essen; Attendance: 9,237; Referee: Florence Guillemin (France)

19 June 2013	Germany	1–0	Canada	Paderborn
18:00 CEST	Maier 53'	Report		Attendance: 9,781; Referee: Pernilla Larsson (Sweden)

29 June 2013	Germany	4–2	Japan	Munich
17:45 CEST	Maier 17'; Okoyino da Mbabi 47' (pen.), 87'; Laudehr 90+2' (pen.)	Report	Miyama (yellow card) 29'; Ohno 40'; Ōgimi 60'	Stadium: Allianz Arena; Attendance: 46,104; Referee: Alexandra Ihringova (England)

== League standings ==
=== Men ===
==== Bundesliga ====
Pos	Team	Pld	W	D	L	GF	GA	GD	Pts	Qualification or relegation
1	Bayern Munich (C)	34	29	4	1	98	18	+80	91	Qualification for the Champions League group stage
2	Borussia Dortmund	34	19	9	6	81	42	+39	66	Qualification for the Champions League group stage
3	Bayer Leverkusen	34	19	8	7	65	39	+26	65	Qualification for the Champions League group stage
4	Schalke 04	34	16	7	11	58	50	+8	55	Qualification for the Champions League play-off round
5	SC Freiburg	34	14	9	11	45	40	+5	51	Qualification for the Europa League group stage
6	Eintracht Frankfurt	34	14	9	11	49	46	+3	51	Qualification for the Europa League play-off round
7	Hamburger SV	34	14	6	14	42	53	−11	48	
8	Borussia Mönchengladbach	34	12	11	11	45	49	−4	47	
9	Hannover 96	34	13	6	15	60	62	−2	45	
10	1. FC Nürnberg	34	11	11	12	39	47	−8	44	
11	VfL Wolfsburg	34	10	13	11	47	52	−5	43	
12	VfB Stuttgart	34	12	7	15	37	55	−18	43	Qualification for the Europa League third qualifying round (Note: VfB Stuttgart qualified for the Europa League by playing Champions League-qualified Bayern Munich in the 2012–13 DFB-Pokal final. Since they lost, they entered the third qualifying round, and the fifth- and sixth-placed team of the 2012–13 Bundesliga entered the group stage and play-off round respectively.)
13	Mainz 05	34	10	12	12	42	44	−2	42	
14	Werder Bremen	34	8	10	16	50	66	−16	34	
15	FC Augsburg	34	8	9	17	33	51	−18	33	
16	1899 Hoffenheim (O)	34	8	7	19	42	67	−25	31	Qualification for the relegation play-offs
17	Fortuna Düsseldorf (R)	34	7	9	18	39	57	−18	30	Relegation to 2. Bundesliga
18	Greuther Fürth (R)	34	4	9	21	26	60	−34	21	Relegation to 2. Bundesliga

Source: Bundesliga.de, kicker.de
Rules for classification: 1) points; 2) goal difference; 3) number of goals scored.
(C) Champions; (O) Play-off winners; (R) Relegated

==== 2. Bundesliga ====
Pos	Team	Pld	W	D	L	GF	GA	GD	Pts	Promotion, qualification or relegation
1	Hertha BSC (C, P)	34	22	10	2	65	28	+37	76	Promotion to Bundesliga
2	Eintracht Braunschweig (P)	34	19	10	5	52	34	+18	67	Promotion to Bundesliga
3	1. FC Kaiserslautern	34	15	13	6	55	33	+22	58	Qualification for promotion play-offs
4	FSV Frankfurt	34	16	6	12	55	45	+10	54	
5	1. FC Köln	34	14	12	8	43	33	+10	54	
6	1860 Munich	34	12	13	9	39	31	+8	49	
7	Union Berlin	34	13	10	11	50	49	+1	49	
8	Energie Cottbus	34	12	12	10	41	36	+5	48	
9	VfR Aalen	34	12	10	12	40	39	+1	46	
10	FC St. Pauli	34	11	10	13	44	47	−3	43	
11	MSV Duisburg (Note: MSV Duisburg were denied a license for the 2013–14 2. Bundesliga season, and, in accordance with the rules of the DFL (Deutsche Fußball Liga), Duisburg are replaced by the best-placed originally relegated team, SV Sandhausen.) (R)	34	11	10	13	37	49	−12	43	Relegation to 3. Liga
12	SC Paderborn	34	11	9	14	45	45	0	42	
13	FC Ingolstadt	34	10	12	12	36	43	−7	42	
14	VfL Bochum	34	10	8	16	40	52	−12	38	
15	Erzgebirge Aue	34	9	10	15	39	46	−7	37	
16	Dynamo Dresden (O)	34	9	10	15	35	49	−14	37	Qualification for relegation play-offs
17	SV Sandhausen	34	6	8	20	38	66	−28	26	
18	Jahn Regensburg (R)	34	4	7	23	36	65	−29	19	Relegation to 3. Liga

Source: kicker.de
Rules for classification: 1) points; 2) goal difference; 3) number of goals scored.
(C) Champions; (O) Play-off winners; (P) Promoted; (R) Relegated

==== 3. Liga ====
Pos	Team	Pld	W	D	L	GF	GA	GD	Pts	Promotion, qualification or relegation
1	Karlsruher SC (C, P)	38	23	10	5	69	27	+42	79	Promotion to 2. Bundesliga and qualification for DFB-Pokal
2	Arminia Bielefeld (P)	38	22	10	6	59	32	+27	76	Promotion to 2. Bundesliga and qualification for DFB-Pokal
3	VfL Osnabrück	38	22	7	9	64	35	+29	73	Qualification to promotion play-offs and DFB-Pokal
4	Preußen Münster	38	20	12	6	63	33	+30	72	Qualification for DFB-Pokal
5	1. FC Heidenheim	38	21	9	8	69	47	+22	72	
6	Chemnitzer FC	38	15	10	13	56	47	+9	55	
7	SV Wehen Wiesbaden	38	11	18	9	51	51	0	51	
8	Wacker Burghausen	38	14	9	15	45	45	0	51	
9	SpVgg Unterhaching	38	14	9	15	48	55	−7	51	
10	Hallescher FC	38	12	10	16	37	50	−13	46	
11	1. FC Saarbrücken	38	12	9	17	52	62	−10	45	
12	Hansa Rostock	38	11	11	16	39	52	−13	44	
13	Rot-Weiß Erfurt	38	11	11	16	44	58	−14	44	
14	VfB Stuttgart II (Note: Reserve teams are ineligible for promotion or DFB-Pokal qualification.)	38	11	10	17	35	42	−7	43	
15	Kickers Offenbach (Note: Offenbach has two points deducted for using bond money from a DFB fund. After the end of the season, Offenbach were not granted a license for the following season and are thus relegated.) (R)	38	11	11	16	41	44	−3	42	Relegation to Regionalliga
16	Borussia Dortmund II	38	9	14	15	39	58	−19	41	
17	Stuttgarter Kickers	38	10	10	18	39	48	−9	40	
18	SV Darmstadt 98	38	8	14	16	32	46	−14	38	
19	SV Babelsberg 03 (R)	38	9	10	19	32	54	−22	37	Relegation to Regionalliga
20	Alemannia Aachen (Note: Alemannia Aachen took voluntary relegation on 23 November 2012, due to financial insolvency. Later has five points deducted for using bond money from a DFB fund and not paying back in time.) (R)	38	7	10	21	40	68	−28	26	Relegation to Regionalliga

Source: kicker
Rules for classification: 1) points; 2) goal difference; 3) number of goals scored.
(C) Champions; (P) Promoted; (R) Relegated

=== Women ===
==== Bundesliga ====
Pos	Team	Pld	W	D	L	GF	GA	GD	Pts	Qualification or relegation
1	VfL Wolfsburg (C)	22	17	2	3	71	16	+55	53	2013–14 UEFA Champions League Round of 32
2	1. FFC Turbine Potsdam	22	16	1	5	70	16	+54	49	2013–14 UEFA Champions League Round of 32
3	1. FFC Frankfurt	22	15	2	5	52	26	+26	47	
4	FC Bayern Munich	22	14	1	7	49	24	+25	43	
5	SC Freiburg	22	9	5	8	33	31	+2	32	
6	SGS Essen	22	8	6	8	26	30	−4	30	
7	SC 07 Bad Neuenahr (R)	22	8	6	8	25	29	−4	30	Club withdrawal
8	Bayer 04 Leverkusen	22	6	8	8	31	40	−9	26	
9	FCR 2001 Duisburg	22	7	3	12	37	47	−10	24	
10	FF USV Jena	22	6	4	12	24	47	−23	22	
11	VfL Sindelfingen	22	3	3	16	14	73	−59	12	
12	FSV Gütersloh 2009 (R)	22	2	1	19	19	72	−53	7	Relegation to 2013–14 2. Bundesliga

Source: kicker.de
Rules for classification: 1) points; 2) goal difference; 3) number of goals scored.
(C) Champions; (R) Relegated

==== 2. Bundesliga ====
===== North =====
Pos	Team	Pld	W	D	L	GF	GA	GD	Pts	Qualification or relegation
1	BV Cloppenburg (C)	22	17	3	2	54	14	+40	54	Promotion to 2013–14 Fußball-Bundesliga
2	Herforder SV Borussia Friedenstal	22	15	2	5	62	26	+36	47	
3	SV Meppen	22	15	1	6	40	22	+18	46	
4	Turbine Potsdam II	22	14	3	5	60	27	+33	45	
5	Werder Bremen	22	13	3	6	54	32	+22	42	
6	1. FC Lok Leipzig	22	9	6	7	41	37	+4	33	
7	1. FC Lübars	22	9	2	11	31	28	+3	29	
8	Magdeburger FFC	22	6	6	10	28	36	−8	24	
9	FF USV Jena II	22	4	4	14	23	49	−26	16	
10	Blau-Weiß Hohen Neuendorf	22	3	5	14	18	56	−38	14	Qualification for the relegation play-off
11	Holstein Kiel (R)	22	3	4	15	20	54	−34	13	Relegation to 2013–14 Regionalliga
12	FFC Oldesloe (R)	22	4	1	17	16	66	−50	13	Relegation to 2013–14 Regionalliga

Updated to match(es) played on 30 May 2013. Source: kicker.de (in German)
Rules for classification: 1) points; 2) goal difference; 3) number of goals scored.
(C) Champions; (R) Relegated

===== South =====
Pos	Team	Pld	W	D	L	GF	GA	GD	Pts	Qualification or relegation
1	TSG 1899 Hoffenheim (C)	22	18	2	2	73	23	+50	56	Promotion to 2013–14 Fußball-Bundesliga
2	1. FC Köln	22	17	4	1	66	14	+52	55	
3	SC Sand	22	17	3	2	65	22	+43	54	
4	TSV Crailsheim	22	9	5	8	39	31	+8	32	
5	ETSV Würzburg	22	10	2	10	44	53	−9	32	
6	1. FC Saarbrücken	22	9	3	10	40	36	+4	30	
7	Bayern Munich II	22	8	5	9	42	32	+10	29	
8	FFC Frankfurt II	22	8	2	12	27	40	−13	26	
9	1. FFC 08 Niederkirchen	22	6	4	12	37	40	−3	22	
10	1. FFC Recklinghausen (R)	22	5	2	15	31	79	−48	17	Qualification for the relegation play-off
11	Bad Neuenahr II (R)	22	3	5	14	17	48	−31	14	Relegation to 2013–14 Regionalliga
12	SV RW Bardenbach (R)	22	2	3	17	23	86	−63	9	Relegation to 2013–14 Regionalliga

Updated to match(es) played on 30 May 2013. Source: kicker.de (in German)
Rules for classification: 1) points; 2) goal difference; 3) number of goals scored.
(C) Champions; (R) Relegated

== German clubs in Europe ==
=== UEFA Champions League ===
==== Play-off round ====
Team 1	Agg.	Team 2	1st leg	2nd leg
Borussia Mönchengladbach (Germany)	3–4	(Ukraine) Dynamo Kyiv	1–3	2–1

==== Group stage ====
===== Group B =====
Pos	Team	Pld	W	D	L	GF	GA	GD	Pts	Qualification	SCH	ARS	OLY	MPL
1	(Germany) Schalke 04	6	3	3	0	10	6	+4	12	Advance to knockout phase	—	2–2	1–0	2–2
2	(England) Arsenal	6	3	1	2	10	8	+2	10	Advance to knockout phase	0–2	—	3–1	2–0
3	(Greece) Olympiacos	6	3	0	3	9	9	0	9	Transfer to Europa League	1–2	2–1	—	3–1
4	(France) Montpellier	6	0	2	4	6	12	−6	2		1–1	1–2	1–2	—

Source: Soccerway

===== Group D =====
Pos	Team	Pld	W	D	L	GF	GA	GD	Pts	Qualification	DOR	RMA	AJX	MCI
1	(Germany) Borussia Dortmund	6	4	2	0	11	5	+6	14	Advance to knockout phase	—	2–1	1–0	1–0
2	(Spain) Real Madrid	6	3	2	1	15	9	+6	11	Advance to knockout phase	2–2	—	4–1	3–2
3	(Netherlands) Ajax	6	1	1	4	8	16	−8	4	Transfer to Europa League	1–4	1–4	—	3–1
4	(England) Manchester City	6	0	3	3	7	11	−4	3		1–1	1–1	2–2	—

Source: Soccerway

===== Group F =====
Pos	Team	Pld	W	D	L	GF	GA	GD	Pts	Qualification	BAY	VAL	BATE	LIL
1	(Germany) Bayern Munich	6	4	1	1	15	7	+8	13 (Note: Head-to-head points: Bayern Munich 4, Valencia 1.)	Advance to knockout phase	—	2–1	4–1	6–1
2	(Spain) Valencia	6	4	1	1	12	5	+7	13	Advance to knockout phase	1–1	—	4–2	2–0
3	(Belarus) BATE Borisov	6	2	0	4	9	15	−6	6	Transfer to Europa League	3–1	0–3	—	0–2
4	(France) Lille	6	1	0	5	4	13	−9	3		0–1	0–1	1–3	—

Source: Soccerway

==== Knockout phase ====
===== Round of 16 =====
Team 1	Agg.	Team 2	1st leg	2nd leg
Galatasaray (Turkey)	4–3	(Germany) Schalke 04	1–1	3–2
Arsenal (England)	3–3 (a)	(Germany) Bayern Munich	1–3	2–0
Shakhtar Donetsk (Ukraine)	2–5	(Germany) Borussia Dortmund	2–2	0–3

===== Quarter-finals =====
Team 1	Agg.	Team 2	1st leg	2nd leg
Málaga (Spain)	2–3	(Germany) Borussia Dortmund	0–0	2–3
Bayern Munich (Germany)	4–0	(Italy) Juventus	2–0	2–0

===== Semi-finals =====
Team 1	Agg.	Team 2	1st leg	2nd leg
Bayern Munich (Germany)	7–0	(Spain) Barcelona	4–0	3–0
Borussia Dortmund (Germany)	4–3	(Spain) Real Madrid	4–1	0–2

===== Final =====
25 May 2013
19:45 BST

Borussia Dortmund (Germany)	1–2	(Germany) Bayern Munich
Gündoğan 68' (pen.)	Report	Mandžukić 60'; Robben 89'

Wembley Stadium, London
Attendance: 86,298
Referee: Nicola Rizzoli (Italy)

=== UEFA Europa League ===
==== Third qualifying round ====
Team 1	Agg.	Team 2	1st leg	2nd leg
St. Patrick's Athletic (Republic of Ireland)	0–5	(Germany) Hannover 96	0–3	0–2

==== Play-off Round ====
Team 1	Agg.	Team 2	1st leg	2nd leg
Śląsk Wrocław (Poland)	4–10	(Germany) Hannover 96	3–5	1–5
Stuttgart (Germany)	3–1	(Russia) Dynamo Moscow	2–0	1–1

==== Group stage ====
===== Group C =====
Pos	Team	Pld	W	D	L	GF	GA	GD	Pts	Qualification	FEN	MGB	OM	AEL
1	(Turkey) Fenerbahçe	6	4	1	1	10	7	+3	13	Advance to knockout phase	—	0–3	2–2	2–0
2	(Germany) Borussia Mönchengladbach	6	3	2	1	11	6	+5	11	Advance to knockout phase	2–4	—	2–0	2–0
3	(France) Marseille	6	1	2	3	9	11	−2	5		0–1	2–2	—	5–1
4	(Cyprus) AEL Limassol	6	1	1	4	4	10	−6	4		0–1	0–0	3–0	—

Source: Soccerway

===== Group E =====
Pos	Team	Pld	W	D	L	GF	GA	GD	Pts	Qualification	STE	STU	COP	MOL
1	(Romania) Steaua București	6	3	2	1	9	9	0	11	Advance to knockout phase	—	1–5	1–0	2–0
2	(Germany) VfB Stuttgart	6	2	2	2	9	6	+3	8 (Note: Head-to-head points: VfB Stuttgart 4, Copenhagen 1.)	Advance to knockout phase	2–2	—	0–0	0–1
3	(Denmark) Copenhagen	6	2	2	2	5	6	−1	8		1–1	0–2	—	2–1
4	(Norway) Molde	6	2	0	4	6	8	−2	6		1–2	2–0	1–2	—

Source: Soccerway

===== Group K =====
Pos	Team	Pld	W	D	L	GF	GA	GD	Pts	Qualification	MET	BAY	ROS	RAP
1	(Ukraine) Metalist Kharkiv	6	4	1	1	9	3	+6	13 (Note: Head-to-head points: Metalist Kharkiv 4, Bayer Leverkusen 1.)	Advance to knockout phase	—	2–0	3–1	2–0
2	(Germany) Bayer Leverkusen	6	4	1	1	9	2	+7	13	Advance to knockout phase	0–0	—	1–0	3–0
3	(Norway) Rosenborg	6	2	0	4	7	10	−3	6		1–2	0–1	—	3–2
4	(Austria) Rapid Wien	6	1	0	5	4	14	−10	3		1–0	0–4	1–2	—

Source: Soccerway

===== Group L =====
Pos	Team	Pld	W	D	L	GF	GA	GD	Pts	Qualification	HAN	LEV	HEL	TWE
1	(Germany) Hannover 96	6	3	3	0	11	8	+3	12	Advance to knockout phase	—	2–1	3–2	0–0
2	(Spain) Levante	6	3	2	1	10	5	+5	11	Advance to knockout phase	2–2	—	1–0	3–0
3	(Sweden) Helsingborgs IF	6	1	1	4	9	12	−3	4 (Note: Head-to-head points: Helsingborg 4, Twente 1.)		1–2	1–3	—	2–2
4	(Netherlands) Twente	6	0	4	2	5	10	−5	4		2–2	0–0	1–3	—

Source: Soccerway

==== Knockout phase ====
===== Round of 32 =====
Team 1	Agg.	Team 2	1st leg	2nd leg
Bayer Leverkusen (Germany)	1–3	(Portugal) Benfica	0–1	1–2
Stuttgart (Germany)	3–1	(Belgium) Genk	1–1	2–0
Anzhi Makhachkala (Russia)	4–2	(Germany) Hannover 96	3–1	1–1
Borussia Mönchengladbach (Germany)	3–5	(Italy) Lazio	3–3	0–2

===== Round of 16 =====
Team 1	Agg.	Team 2	1st leg	2nd leg
Stuttgart (Germany)	1–5	(Italy) Lazio	0–2	1–3

=== UEFA Women's Champions League ===
==== Round of 32 ====
Team 1	Agg.	Team 2	1st leg	2nd leg
Unia Racibórz (Poland)	2–11	(Germany) Wolfsburg	1–5	1–6
Standard Liège (Belgium)	1–8	(Germany) Turbine Potsdam	1–3	0–5

==== Round of 16 ====
Team 1	Agg.	Team 2	1st leg	2nd leg
Wolfsburg (Germany)	5–2	(Norway) Røa	4–1	1–1
Arsenal (England)	6–4	(Germany) Turbine Potsdam	2–1	4–3

==== Quarter-finals ====
Team 1	Agg.	Team 2	1st leg	2nd leg
Wolfsburg (Germany)	4–1	(Russia) Rossiyanka	2–1	2–0

==== Semi-finals ====
Team 1	Agg.	Team 2	1st leg	2nd leg
Arsenal (England)	1–4	(Germany) Wolfsburg	0–2	1–2

==== Final ====
23 May 2013
19:30 BST

Wolfsburg (Germany)	1–0	(France) Lyon
Müller 73' (pen.)	Report

Stamford Bridge, London
Attendance: 19,278
Referee: Teodora Albon (Romania)

== Managerial changes ==
=== Managerial changes ===
Team	Outgoing manager	Date of vacancy	Incoming manager	Date of appointment
FC Augsburg	(Netherlands) Jos Luhukay	5 May 2012	(Germany) Markus Weinzierl	17 May 2012
SV Babelsberg 03	(Germany) Dietmar Demuth	15 May 2012	(Germany) Christian Benbennek	15 May 2012
SpVgg Unterhaching	(Germany) Heiko Herrlich	25 May 2012	(Germany) Claus Schromm	28 June 2012
Wacker Burghausen	(Germany) Reinhard Stumpf	30 June 2012	(Bulgaria) Georgi Donkov	1 July 2012
1. FC Köln	(Germany) Frank Schaefer	30 June 2012	(Germany) Holger Stanislawski	1 July 2012
1. FC Kaiserslautern	(Bulgaria) Krasimir Balakov	30 June 2012	(Germany) Franco Foda	1 July 2012
Hertha BSC	(Germany) Otto Rehhagel	30 June 2012	(Netherlands) Jos Luhukay	1 July 2012
Jahn Regensburg	(Germany) Markus Weinzierl	30 June 2012	(Germany) Oscar Corrochano	1 July 2012
SC Paderborn 07	(Germany) Roger Schmidt	30 June 2012	(Germany) Stephan Schmidt	10 July 2012
Rot-Weiß Erfurt	(Germany) Stefan Emmerling	25 August 2012	(Germany) Alois Schwartz	10 September 2012
MSV Duisburg	(Germany) Oliver Reck	25 August 2012	(Germany) Kosta Runjaić	3 September 2012
SV Darmstadt 98	(Germany) Kosta Runjaić	2 September 2012	(Germany) Jürgen Seeberger	5 September 2012
Hansa Rostock	(Germany) Wolfgang Wolf	3 September 2012	(Germany) Marc Fascher	5 September 2012
Alemannia Aachen	(Germany) Ralf Außem	3 September 2012	(Netherlands) René van Eck	10 September 2012
FC St. Pauli	(Germany) André Schubert	26 September 2012	(Germany) Michael Frontzeck	3 October 2012
VfL Wolfsburg	(Germany) Felix Magath	25 October 2012	(Germany) Dieter Hecking	22 December 2012
VfL Bochum	(Germany) Andreas Bergmann	28 October 2012	(Germany) Karsten Neitzel (caretaker)	28 October 2012
Jahn Regensburg	(Germany) Oscar Corrochano	4 November 2012	(Poland) Franciszek Smuda	2 January 2013
1860 Munich	(Germany) Reiner Maurer	18 November 2012	(Germany) Alexander Schmidt	18 November 2012
SV Sandhausen	(Germany) Gerd Dais	19 November 2012	(Germany) Hans-Jürgen Boysen	20 November 2012
Stuttgarter Kickers	(Germany) Dirk Schuster	19 November 2012	(Germany) Guido Buchwald (interim)	20 December 2012
1899 Hoffenheim	(Germany) Markus Babbel	3 December 2012	(Germany) Marco Kurz	1 January 2013
Dynamo Dresden	(Germany) Ralf Loose	9 December 2012	(Austria) Peter Pacult	3 January 2013
SV Darmstadt 98	(Germany) Jürgen Seeberger	17 December 2012	(Germany) Dirk Schuster	28 December 2012
Schalke 04	(Netherlands) Huub Stevens	16 December 2012	(Germany) Jens Keller	16 December 2012
Stuttgarter Kickers	(Germany) Guido Buchwald	20 December 2012	(Germany) Gerd Dais	20 December 2012
1. FC Nürnberg	(Germany) Dieter Hecking	22 December 2012	(Germany) Michael Wiesinger	24 December 2012
Kickers Offenbach	(Germany) Arie van Lent	6 February 2013	(Germany) Rico Schmitt	13 February 2013
Greuther Fürth	(Germany) Mike Büskens	20 February 2013	(Germany) Frank Kramer	11 March 2013
1899 Hoffenheim	(Germany) Marco Kurz	2 April 2013	(Germany) Markus Gisdol	2 April 2013
Stuttgarter Kickers	(Germany) Gerd Dais	7 April 2013	(Italy) Massimo Morales	7 April 2013
VfL Bochum	(Germany) Karsten Neitzel	8 April 2013	(Germany) Peter Neururer	8 April 2013
SV Babelsberg 03	(Germany) Christian Benbennek	9 April 2013	(Bosnia and Herzegovina) Almedin Civa (interim)	19 April 2013
FC Erzgebirge Aue	(Germany) Karsten Baumann	28 April 2013	(Germany) Falko Götz	29 April 2013
SV Babelsberg 03	(Bosnia and Herzegovina) Almedin Civa	29 April 2013	(Germany) Dieter Timme	29 April 2013
SC Paderborn 07	(Germany) Stephan Schmidt	5 May 2013	(Germany) René Müller (caretaker)	5 May 2013
Werder Bremen	(Germany) Thomas Schaaf	15 May 2013	(Germany) Wolfgang Rolff	15 May 2013
VfL Osnabrück	(Germany) Claus-Dieter Wollitz	17 May 2013	(Germany) Alexander Ukrow (interim)	17 May 2013

== Transfers ==
- List of German football transfers summer 2012

== Deaths ==
- 19 July 2012 – Hans Nowak, 74, defender for FC Schalke 04, FC Bayern Munich, and Kickers Offenbach and member of the 1962 West Germany World Cup squad.
- 11 October 2012 – Helmut Haller, 73, midfielder for FC Augsburg. A German international, Haller played 3 World Cups. Outside Germany, he won almost 200 Serie A caps in Italy.
- 22 November 2012 – Raimund Krauth, 59, striker for Karlsruher SC, Eintracht Frankfurt, and FK Pirmasens.
- 28 March 2013 – Heinz Patzig, 83, midfielder for Eintracht Braunschweig and others. After his playing career, he worked as Braunschweig's assistant manager for 27 straight seasons.
- 7 April 2013 – Hans Jäcker, 80, goalkeeper for Eintracht Braunschweig.
- 15 June 2013 – Heinz Flohe, 65, midfielder for 1. FC Köln and TSV 1860 Munich. He was a member of the 1974 World Cup champion West Germany squad as well as the 1976 Euro and 1978 World Cup squads.
- 16 June 2013 – Ottmar Walter, 89, forward for 1. FC Kaiserslautern and others. He was a member of the 1954 World Cup champion West Germany squad.
