= 2013 UEFA Champions League final =

Football match in London, England

- Match programme cover
- Event: 2012–13 UEFA Champions League
Borussia Dortmund	Bayern Munich
(Germany)	(Germany)
1	2
- Date: 25 May 2013
- Venue: Wembley Stadium, London
- UEFA Man of the Match: Arjen Robben (Bayern Munich)
- Fans' Man of the Match: Manuel Neuer (Bayern Munich)
- Referee: Nicola Rizzoli (Italy)
- Attendance: 86,298
- Weather: Sunny; 14 °C (57 °F); 40% humidity

The 2013 UEFA Champions League final was the final match of the 2012–13 UEFA Champions League, the 58th season of Europe's premier club football tournament organised by UEFA, and the 21st season since it was renamed from the European Champion Clubs' Cup to the UEFA Champions League.

The match took place on Saturday, 25 May 2013, at Wembley Stadium in London, England, between German Bundesliga clubs Borussia Dortmund and Bayern Munich. In the first all-German Champions League final, Bayern won the match 2–1 with goals from Mario Mandžukić and man of the match Arjen Robben coming either side of an İlkay Gündoğan penalty for Dortmund.

One week later, Bayern won the 2012–13 DFB-Pokal and, having already won the 2012–13 Bundesliga, completed the continental treble. As a result of their Champions League win, Bayern qualified to play against Chelsea, the winners of the 2012–13 UEFA Europa League, in the 2013 UEFA Super Cup, and also earned the right to enter the semi-finals of the 2013 FIFA Club World Cup as the UEFA representative. They would eventually go on to win both competitions.

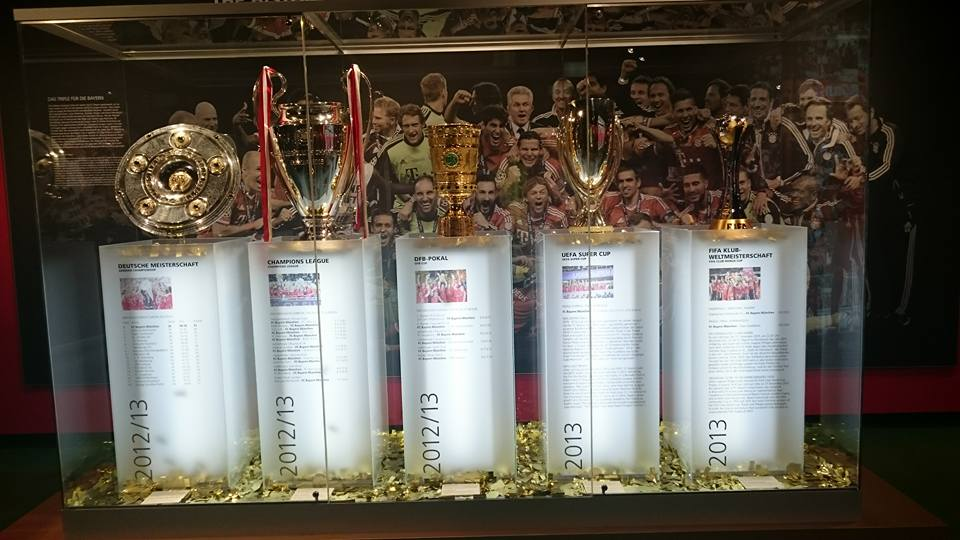
The 5 trophies won by Bayern Munich in 2013 (Bundesliga, Champions League, DFB-Pokal UEFA Super Cup, FIFA Club World Cup)

A viewership of 21.6 million on the German ZDF and over 360 million worldwide has been reported, making it the most watched sports broadcast of 2013.

== Background ==
This was the first time in the history of the Champions League (and European Cup) that the final was contested between two German sides. There were three previous Champions League finals between two clubs from the same country: 2000 (Spain), 2003 (Italy), and 2008 (England).

It was Bayern Munich's 10th European Cup/Champions League final, third all-time behind Real Madrid (12) and A.C. Milan (11). They won four of those finals: in 1974, 1975, 1976, and most recently in 2001. The 2013 final was Bayern's third final in four years; they lost in both 2010 and 2012 (as the first team since 1984 to reach the Final held in their home stadium), adding to previous final losses in 1982, 1987, and 1999.

For Dortmund, this was their second Champions League final, with them winning their first title in 1997. The next season as defending champions, they defeated Bayern in their only previous meetings in European competitions, winning 1–0 on aggregate in the 1997–98 UEFA Champions League quarter-finals, before being eliminated 2–0 on aggregate in the semi-finals by Real Madrid, managed at the time by Jupp Heynckes.

In 2003, Bayern provided a €2 million loan without collateral to the nearly bankrupt Dortmund which has since been repaid. There has been a heated rivalry between Bayern and Dortmund, known in Germany as Der Klassiker, which became prevalent during the 1990s. In 2011–12, Dortmund won the Bundesliga and the DFB Pokal with Bayern finishing runners-up in both competitions; Dortmund clinched the league title in a home match where bananas were tossed at Bayern goalkeeper Manuel Neuer. In 2012–13, Bayern bested Dortmund for both trophies, as well as the DFL-Supercup. Just before Dortmund's Champions League semi-final, it was announced that one of their homegrown stars, Mario Götze, would make a €37 million transfer to Bayern for the upcoming 2013–14 season, a move that some felt would have put more distance between wealthy Bayern and the rest of the Bundesliga. The final 2012–13 Bundesliga game between the two clubs was a 1–1 draw marked by acrimony as Bayern's Rafinha was sent off for elbowing Dortmund's Jakub Blaszczykowski, sparking an argument on the touchline between Dortmund coach Jürgen Klopp and Bayern sporting director Matthias Sammer. The press has used terms like 'power shift' and 'changing of the guard' after Dortmund and Bayern eliminated Spanish giants Real Madrid and Barcelona, respectively, in the Champions League semi-finals.

== Venue ==
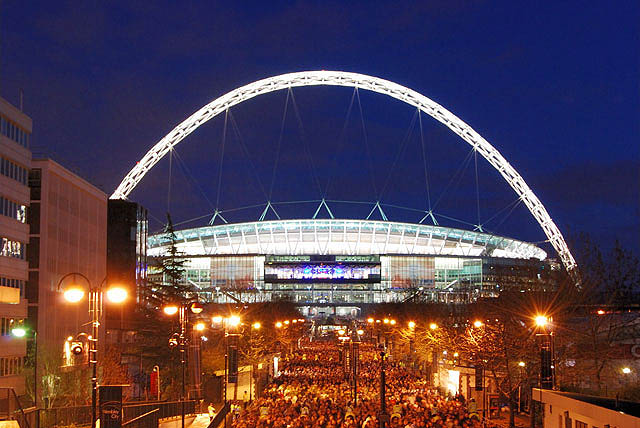
Wembley Stadium has hosted the European Cup/Champions League final seven times, most recently in 2013 and 2024.

Wembley Stadium, England's national stadium and home of the England national football team, was announced as the venue of the 2013 final on 16 June 2011. Having hosted the 2011 final, Wembley made history for being the first stadium in the tournament's history to host the final twice in three years. Discussing the short time between the two finals, UEFA President Michel Platini explained that the final would be in celebration of 150 years of the Football Association's existence. It was the seventh occasion that Wembley hosted the final after hosting the 1963, 1968, 1971, 1978, 1992 and the 2011 finals of Europe's premier club competition.

The original Wembley Stadium hosted five European Cup finals. The 1968 and 1978 finals were both won by English sides: Manchester United beat Benfica 4–1 in 1968 and Liverpool defeated Club Brugge 1–0 in 1978. Benfica also lost in the 1963 final, beaten 2–1 by A.C. Milan, while Ajax won the first of three consecutive European Cups at Wembley in 1971, beating Panathinaikos 2–0. In the 1992 final, Spanish club Barcelona defeated Italian side Sampdoria 1–0 in the final match played as the European Cup prior to the following season's introduction of the current Champions League format.

First opened for the British Empire Exhibition in 1923, the stadium was originally known as the Empire Stadium. That year, it hosted its first FA Cup Final, when almost 200,000 spectators attempted to watch the match between Bolton Wanderers and West Ham United. Wembley played host to all of England's matches at the 1966 FIFA World Cup, including the 4–2 victory over West Germany in the final, and at UEFA Euro 1996. The original stadium was closed in 2000 and demolished three years later, to be replaced by a 90,000-capacity stadium, which opened in 2007. The new stadium hosted the 2011 UEFA Champions League final, which pitted Barcelona against Manchester United in a re-match of the final played two years previously. Barcelona claimed their fourth European title as they ran out 3–1 winners.

== Route to the final ==
Note: In all results below, the score of the finalist is given first (H: home; A: away).

(Germany) Borussia Dortmund				Round	(Germany) Bayern Munich			
Opponent	Result			Group stage	Opponent	Result		
(Netherlands) Ajax	1–0 (H)			Matchday 1	(Spain) Valencia	2–1 (H)		
(England) Manchester City	1–1 (A)			Matchday 2	(Belarus) BATE Borisov	1–3 (A)		
(Spain) Real Madrid	2–1 (H)			Matchday 3	(France) Lille	1–0 (A)		
(Spain) Real Madrid	2–2 (A)			Matchday 4	(France) Lille	6–1 (H)		
(Netherlands) Ajax	4–1 (A)			Matchday 5	(Spain) Valencia	1–1 (A)		
(England) Manchester City	1–0 (H)			Matchday 6	(Belarus) BATE Borisov	4–1 (H)		
Group D winners: Pos / Team / Pld / Pts; 1 / (Germany) Borussia Dortmund / 6 / 14; 2 / (Spain) Real Madrid / 6 / 11; 3 / (Netherlands) Ajax / 6 / 4; 4 / (England) Manchester City / 6 / 3; Source: Soccerway				Final standings	Group F winners: Pos / Team / Pld / Pts; 1 / (Germany) Bayern Munich / 6 / 13; 2 / (Spain) Valencia / 6 / 13; 3 / (Belarus) BATE Borisov / 6 / 6; 4 / (France) Lille / 6 / 3; Source: Soccerway			
Opponent	Agg.	1st leg	2nd leg	Knockout phase	Opponent	Agg.	1st leg	2nd leg
(Ukraine) Shakhtar Donetsk	5–2	2–2 (A)	3–0 (H)	Round of 16	(England) Arsenal	3–3 (a)	3–1 (A)	0–2 (H)
(Spain) Málaga	3–2	0–0 (A)	3–2 (H)	Quarter-finals	(Italy) Juventus	4–0	2–0 (H)	2–0 (A)
(Spain) Real Madrid	4–3	4–1 (H)	0–2 (A)	Semi-finals	(Spain) Barcelona	7–0	4–0 (H)	3–0 (A)

== Pre-match ==
=== Ambassador ===
The two-time Champions League winner and ex-England international Steve McManaman was appointed as the official ambassador for the final.

=== Officials ===
In May 2013, Italian referee Nicola Rizzoli was selected to supervise the final. He was joined by compatriots Renato Faverani and Andrea Stefani as assistant referees, Gianluca Rocchi and Paolo Tagliavento as additional assistant referees, Gianluca Cariolato as reserve assistant referee, and Slovenian Damir Skomina as fourth official.

=== Opening ceremony ===
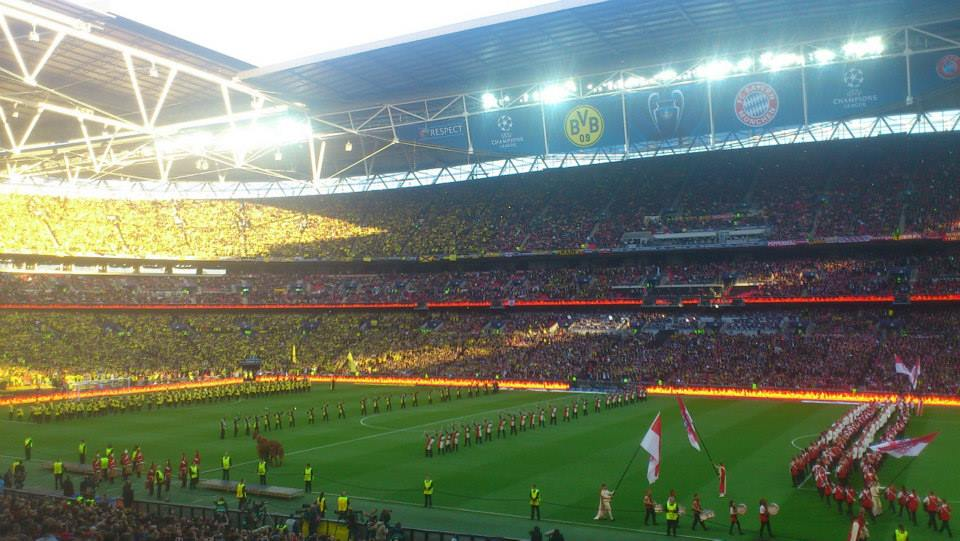
The 2013 Champions League final opening ceremony.

The opening ceremony was directed by Kevin Spacey's executive assistant and The Prince's Trust ambassador Hamish Jenkinson and his business partner Jonny Grant, who had previously directed the 2011 opening ceremony, also at Wembley. The ceremony, also titled "Battle of Kings", was produced by Films United. It was directed and produced by Grigorij Richters and his producing partner Alex Souabni. Both were the former filmmakers-in-residence of Kevin Spacey and Jenkinson at The Old Vic Theatre in London. The film focused around the story of activist and fundraiser Stephen Sutton, who was part of the group of performers.

=== Match ball ===
The match ball for the final was the Adidas Finale Wembley, which featured the same "Starball" panel configuration as the last three finals. The ball was predominantly white, with each star in blue with yellow patterning and a purple border. Six of the 12 stars featured designs recalling the six previous times that the European Cup final had been held at Wembley Stadium. The ball was unveiled on 30 January 2013 and was used for all knockout stage matches in the 2012–13 competition.

=== Ticketing ===
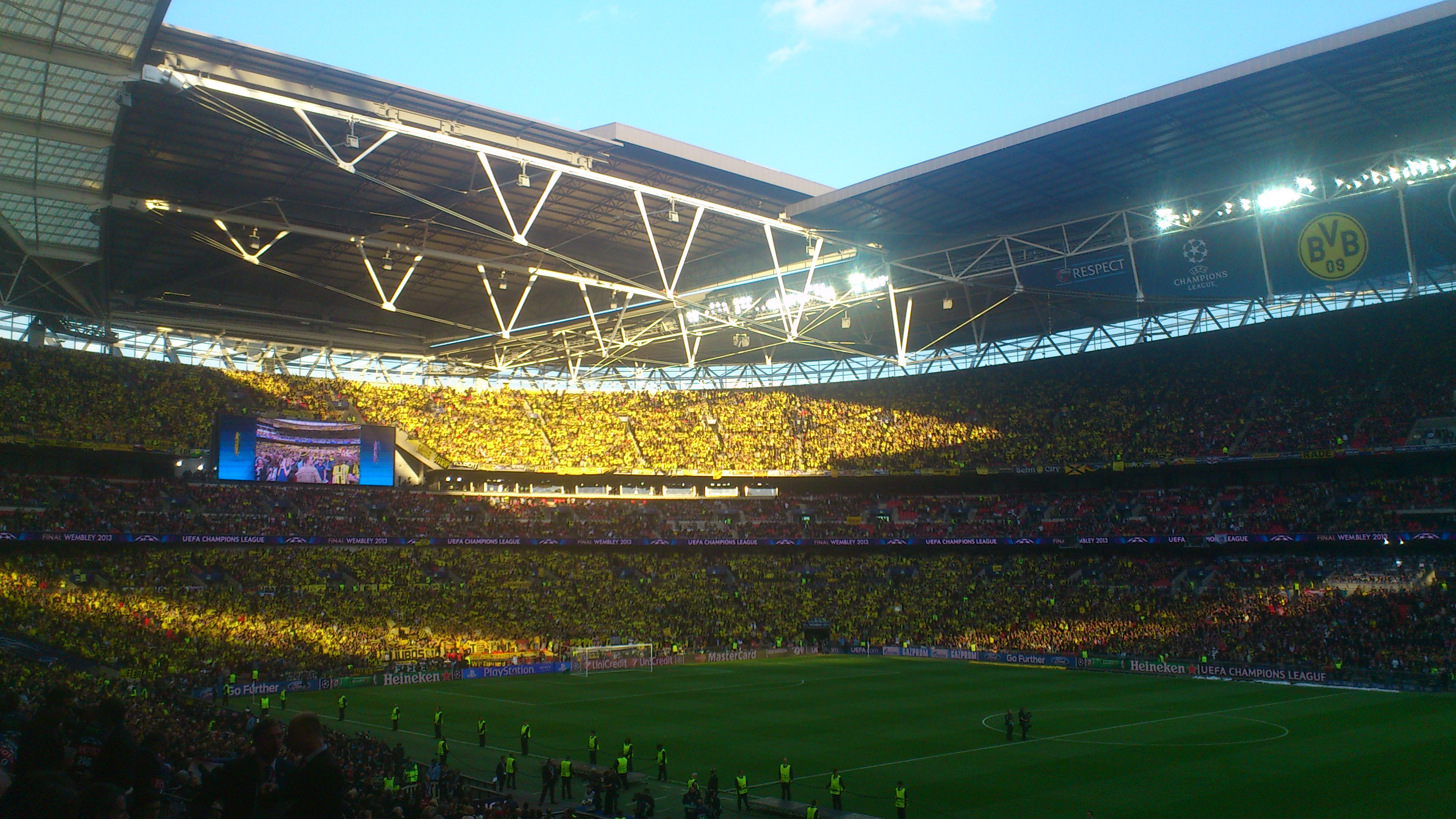
Borussia Dortmund fans in Wembley before kick-off

The international ticket sales phase for the general public ran from 11 February to 15 March 2013. Tickets were available in four price categories: £330, £230, £140, and £60. Due to the high demand for tickets, allocation was determined by a lottery.

The two finalist clubs were allocated 25,000 tickets each. Borussia Dortmund received 502,567 requests for tickets, while there were approximately 250,000 orders for tickets from members of Bayern Munich. Both clubs used draws as a means of awarding tickets.

=== Related events ===
As is the annual custom, the UEFA Champions League and UEFA Women's Champions League trophies were presented to the host city at a special ceremony at Banqueting House, Whitehall, on 19 April 2013. Receiving the trophies from UEFA President Michel Platini were the Minister for Sport and the Olympics Hugh Robertson and the Mayor of London's commissioner for sport, Kate Hoey. Representing the previous season's competition winners were John Terry, Frank Lampard, Petr Čech, Fernando Torres and Branislav Ivanović of Chelsea, and Lotta Schelin of the Lyon ladies' team. Also in attendance were final ambassadors Graeme Le Saux and Faye White, who had escorted the trophies from Stamford Bridge to Banqueting House via London's public transport system, and David Bernstein, the chairman of The Football Association.

The UEFA Champions Festival was held at the International Quarter, Stratford City, next to the Queen Elizabeth Olympic Park, from 23 to 26 May 2013.

The 2013 UEFA Women's Champions League final was held at Stamford Bridge on 23 May 2013 between Wolfsburg and Lyon. Wolfsburg won the game, with Martina Müller scoring the only goal. This ensured that for the first time ever the same nation won both the men's and women's European club titles in the same year.

=== Team selection ===
Borussia Dortmund's Mario Götze, who would join Bayern Munich in the summer, missed the match with a hamstring injury that had kept him out since the semi-final second leg against Real Madrid. Right-back Łukasz Piszczek did play, however, despite being due for hip surgery, while centre-back Mats Hummels recovered from a sprained ankle in time to play. Bayern Munich were without defender Holger Badstuber, who was expected to be out for 10 months with a knee injury, and Toni Kroos, who had yet to recover from an injury sustained in the quarter-final.

== Match ==
=== Summary ===
Dortmund were the dominant team in the first half-hour of the match, pressing Bayern intensely. Manuel Neuer made five important saves in the first 35 minutes, including two from shots by Robert Lewandowski and one from Marco Reus. Despite this dominance, Dortmund failed to generate many dangerous attacks, as Neuer's only difficult save came when Jakub Błaszczykowski volleyed a cross toward Neuer's near post, which the Bayern keeper deflected out for a corner. A Mario Mandžukić header forced a save from Roman Weidenfeller and Javi Martínez put a header from the ensuing corner just over the bar. The first half was an open affair; while Dortmund dominated the early stages, Bayern were still able to generate several chances through Arjen Robben, who forced Weidenfeller into three saves in the first half. Dortmund were able to generate many of their chances due to uncharacteristically poor play from Philipp Lahm, who gave the ball back to Dortmund in his own half on two occasions.

Bayern later took the initiative and scored the first goal in the 60th minute, when Robben and Franck Ribéry combined to set up Mandžukić for a left-footed finish, the ball going past Marcel Schmelzer on the goal line from three yards out. Shortly after, Dante raised his foot in the penalty area and caught Reus in the stomach; İlkay Gündoğan scored the resulting penalty, shooting low into the left corner and sending Neuer the wrong way. Bayern had a chance to re-take the lead several moments later, when Thomas Müller rounded Weidenfeller and attempted to find Robben, with the ball rolling towards the open goal, only for Neven Subotić to make a last ditch clearance off the line, preventing a tap-in from Robben. Late in the match, Bayern seemed the more likely to score, as David Alaba forced Weidenfeller into a save with a shot from long range. Moments later, a through-ball from Robben caught the Dortmund defence cold, resulting in Bayern having Müller and Mandžukić in a two-on-one with Weidenfeller. Subotić again came to Dortmund's rescue, as he was able to catch up and pressure Müller into playing a poor pass, which left Mandžukić with a tight angle, and the Croatian blasted into the side netting. With a minute left in normal time, Ribéry played in Robben with a back-heeled pass; the Dutch forward burst past the defence and scuffed a weak, low shot past the onrushing Weidenfeller with his left foot from eight yards out for the winning goal.

=== Details ===
25 May 2013
19:45 UTC+1

Borussia Dortmund (Germany)	1–2	(Germany) Bayern Munich
Gündoğan 68' (pen.)	Report	Mandžukić 60'; Robben 89'

Wembley Stadium, London
Attendance: 86,298
Referee: Nicola Rizzoli (Italy)

Borussia Dortmund	Bayern Munich

GK	1	(Germany) Roman Weidenfeller (c)
RB	26	(Poland) Łukasz Piszczek
CB	4	(Serbia) Neven Subotić
CB	15	(Germany) Mats Hummels
LB	29	(Germany) Marcel Schmelzer
CM	6	(Germany) Sven Bender		(substituted off) 90+2'
CM	8	(Germany) İlkay Gündoğan
RW	16	(Poland) Jakub Błaszczykowski		(substituted off) 90'
AM	11	(Germany) Marco Reus
LW	19	(Germany) Kevin Großkreutz	(yellow card) 73'
CF	9	(Poland) Robert Lewandowski
Substitutes:
GK	20	(Australia) Mitchell Langerak
DF	27	(Brazil) Felipe Santana
MF	5	(Germany) Sebastian Kehl
MF	7	(Germany) Moritz Leitner
MF	18	(Turkey) Nuri Şahin		(substituted on) 90+2'
MF	21	(Germany) Oliver Kirch
FW	23	(Germany) Julian Schieber		(substituted on) 90'
Manager:
(Germany) Jürgen Klopp

GK	1	(Germany) Manuel Neuer
RB	21	(Germany) Philipp Lahm (c)
CB	17	(Germany) Jérôme Boateng
CB	4	(Brazil) Dante	(yellow card) 29'
LB	27	(Austria) David Alaba
CM	8	(Spain) Javi Martínez
CM	31	(Germany) Bastian Schweinsteiger
RW	10	(Netherlands) Arjen Robben
AM	25	(Germany) Thomas Müller
LW	7	(France) Franck Ribéry	(yellow card) 73'	(substituted off) 90+1'
CF	9	(Croatia) Mario Mandžukić		(substituted off) 90+4'
Substitutes:
GK	22	(Germany) Tom Starke
DF	5	(Belgium) Daniel Van Buyten
MF	11	(Switzerland) Xherdan Shaqiri
MF	30	(Brazil) Luiz Gustavo		(substituted on) 90+1'
MF	44	(Ukraine) Anatoliy Tymoshchuk
FW	14	(Peru) Claudio Pizarro
FW	33	(Germany) Mario Gómez		(substituted on) 90+4'
Manager:
(Germany) Jupp Heynckes

UEFA Man of the Match:
Arjen Robben (Bayern Munich)
Fans' Man of the Match:
Manuel Neuer (Bayern Munich)

Assistant referees:
Renato Faverani (Italy)
Andrea Stefani (Italy)
Fourth official:
Damir Skomina (Slovenia)
Additional assistant referees:
Gianluca Rocchi (Italy)
Paolo Tagliavento (Italy)
Reserve assistant referee:
Gianluca Cariolato (Italy)

Match rules

- 90 minutes
- 30 minutes of extra time if necessary
- Penalty shoot-out if scores still level
- Seven named substitutes
- Maximum of three substitutions

=== Statistics ===
First half
Statistic	Borussia Dortmund	Bayern Munich
Goals scored	0	0
Total shots	7	5
Shots on target	5	3
Saves	3	5
Ball possession	40%	60%
Corner kicks	5	3
Fouls committed	5	2
Offsides	0	2
Yellow cards	0	1
Red cards	0	0

Second half
Statistic	Borussia Dortmund	Bayern Munich
Goals scored	1	2
Total shots	5	9
Shots on target	3	6
Saves	4	1
Ball possession	44%	56%
Corner kicks	1	5
Fouls committed	6	5
Offsides	1	2
Yellow cards	1	1
Red cards	0	0

Overall
Statistic	Borussia Dortmund	Bayern Munich
Goals scored	1	2
Total shots	12	14
Shots on target	8	9
Saves	7	6
Ball possession	42%	58%
Corner kicks	6	8
Fouls committed	11	7
Offsides	1	4
Yellow cards	1	2
Red cards	0	0

== Post-match ==
Borussia Dortmund's manager Jürgen Klopp commented that the long season caught up with Dortmund. "It was late in the game and from the 75th minute it was very hard for us after a tough season, but we deserved to be in the final and we showed that tonight" he said. Borussia Dortmund defender Mats Hummels said the game was really close and very disappointing, and that they were the better team in the first 25 minutes but missed the goal that was needed. Bayern Munich's manager Jupp Heynckes said that "We have achieved something unique".

== See also ==
- 2013 UEFA Women's Champions League final
- 2013 UEFA Europa League final
- 2012–13 Borussia Dortmund season
- 2012–13 FC Bayern Munich season
- Borussia Dortmund in international football
- FC Bayern Munich in international football
- German football clubs in European competitions
