= 2012–13 UEFA Europa League knockout phase =

International football competition

The knockout phase of the 2012–13 UEFA Europa League began on 14 February with the round of 32 and concluded on 15 May 2013 with the final at Amsterdam Arena in Amsterdam, Netherlands.

Times up to 30 March 2013 (round of 16) are CET (UTC+1), thereafter (quarter-finals and beyond) times are CEST (UTC+2).

== Round and draw dates ==
All draws are held at UEFA headquarters in Nyon, Switzerland.

Round	Draw date	First leg	Second leg
Round of 32	20 December 2012, 14:00	14 February 2013	21 February 2013
Round of 16	20 December 2012, 14:00	7 March 2013	14 March 2013
Quarter-finals	15 March 2013, 13:00	4 April 2013	11 April 2013
Semi-finals	12 April 2013, 12:00	25 April 2013	2 May 2013
Final	12 April 2013, 12:00	15 May 2013 at Amsterdam Arena, Amsterdam	

Matches may also be played on Tuesdays or Wednesdays instead of the regular Thursdays due to scheduling conflicts.

== Format ==
The knockout phase involves 32 teams: the 24 teams that finished in the top two in each group in the group stage and the eight teams that finished in third place in the Champions League group stage.

Each tie in the knockout phase, apart from the final, is played over two legs, with each team playing one leg at home. The team that has the higher aggregate score over the two legs progresses to the next round. In the event that aggregate scores finish level, the away goals rule is applied, i.e. the team that scored more goals away from home over the two legs progresses. If away goals are also equal, then thirty minutes of extra time are played, divided into two fifteen-minutes halves. The away goals rule is again applied after extra time, i.e. if there are goals scored during extra time and the aggregate score is still level, the visiting team qualifies by virtue of more away goals scored. If no goals are scored during extra time, the tie is decided by penalty shootout. In the final, the tie is played as a single match. If scores are level at the end of normal time in the final, extra time is played, followed by penalties if scores remain tied.

The mechanism of the draws for each round is as follows:

- In the draw for the round of 32, the twelve group winners and the four better third-placed teams from the Champions League group stage (based on their match record in the group stage) are seeded, and the twelve group runners-up and the other four third-placed teams from the Champions League group stage are unseeded. A seeded team is drawn against an unseeded team, with the seeded team hosting the second leg. Teams from the same group or the same association cannot be drawn against each other.
- In the draws for the round of 16 onwards, there are no seedings, and teams from the same group or the same association may be drawn against each other.

== Qualified teams ==
Key to colours
Seeded in round of 32 draw
Unseeded in round of 32 draw

=== Europa League group stage winners and runners-up ===
Group	Winners	Runners-up
A	(England) Liverpool	(Russia) Anzhi Makhachkala
B	(Czech Republic) Viktoria Plzeň	(Spain) Atlético Madrid
C	(Turkey) Fenerbahçe	(Germany) Borussia Mönchengladbach
D	(France) Bordeaux	(England) Newcastle United
E	(Romania) Steaua București	(Germany) VfB Stuttgart
F	(Ukraine) Dnipro Dnipropetrovsk	(Italy) Napoli
G	(Belgium) Genk	(Switzerland) Basel
H	(Russia) Rubin Kazan	(Italy) Internazionale
I	(France) Lyon	(Czech Republic) Sparta Prague
J	(Italy) Lazio	(England) Tottenham Hotspur
K	(Ukraine) Metalist Kharkiv	(Germany) Bayer Leverkusen
L	(Germany) Hannover 96	(Spain) Levante

=== Champions League group stage third-placed teams ===
Grp	Team	Pld	W	D	L	GF	GA	GD	Pts
E	(England) Chelsea	6	3	1	2	16	10	+6	10
H	(Romania) CFR Cluj	6	3	1	2	9	7	+2	10
B	(Greece) Olympiacos	6	3	0	3	9	9	0	9
G	(Portugal) Benfica	6	2	2	2	5	5	0	8
C	(Russia) Zenit Saint Petersburg	6	2	1	3	6	9	−3	7
F	(Belarus) BATE Borisov	6	2	0	4	9	15	−6	6
A	(Ukraine) Dynamo Kyiv	6	1	2	3	6	10	−4	5
D	(Netherlands) Ajax	6	1	1	4	8	16	−8	4

Rules for classification: 1. Points; 2. Goal difference; 3. Goals scored; 4. Away goals scored; 5. Wins; 6. Away wins; 7. Club coefficient.

== Bracket ==
Round of 32
(Italy) Napoli	0	0	0
(Czech Republic) Viktoria Plzeň	3	2	5
(Belarus) BATE Borisov	0	0	0
(Turkey) Fenerbahçe	0	1	1
(Germany) VfB Stuttgart	1	2	3
(Belgium) Genk	1	0	1
(Germany) Borussia Mönchengladbach	3	0	3
(Italy) Lazio	3	2	5
(Germany) Bayer Leverkusen	0	1	1
(Portugal) Benfica	1	2	3
(Ukraine) Dynamo Kyiv	1	0	1
(France) Bordeaux	1	1	2
(Russia) Anzhi Makhachkala	3	1	4
(Germany) Hannover 96	1	1	2
(England) Newcastle United	0	1	1
(Ukraine) Metalist Kharkiv	0	0	0
(England) Tottenham Hotspur	2	1	3
(France) Lyon	1	1	2
(Italy) Internazionale	2	3	5
(Romania) CFR Cluj	0	0	0
(Switzerland) Basel	2	1	3
(Ukraine) Dnipro Dnipropetrovsk	0	1	1
(Russia) Zenit Saint Petersburg (a)	2	1	3
(England) Liverpool	0	3	3
(Netherlands) Ajax	2	0	2 (2)
(Romania) Steaua București (p)	0	2	2 (4)
(Czech Republic) Sparta Prague	0	1	1
(England) Chelsea	1	1	2
(Spain) Levante	3	1	4
(Greece) Olympiacos	0	0	0
(Spain) Atlético Madrid	0	1	1
(Russia) Rubin Kazan	2	0	2

Round of 16
(Czech Republic) Viktoria Plzeň	0	1	1
(Turkey) Fenerbahçe	1	1	2
(Germany) VfB Stuttgart	0	1	1
(Italy) Lazio	2	3	5
(Portugal) Benfica	1	3	4
(France) Bordeaux	0	2	2
(Russia) Anzhi Makhachkala	0	0	0
(England) Newcastle United	0	1	1
(England) Tottenham Hotspur (a.e.t.; a)	3	1	4
(Italy) Internazionale	0	4	4
(Switzerland) Basel	2	0	2
(Russia) Zenit Saint Petersburg	0	1	1
(Romania) Steaua București	1	1	2
(England) Chelsea	0	3	3
(Spain) Levante	0	0	0
(Russia) Rubin Kazan (a.e.t.)	0	2	2

Quarter-finals
(Turkey) Fenerbahçe	2	1	3
(Italy) Lazio	0	1	1
(Portugal) Benfica	3	1	4
(England) Newcastle United	1	1	2
(England) Tottenham Hotspur	2	2	4 (1)
(Switzerland) Basel (p)	2	2	4 (4)
(England) Chelsea	3	2	5
(Russia) Rubin Kazan	1	3	4

Semi-finals
(Turkey) Fenerbahçe	1	1	2
(Portugal) Benfica	0	3	3
(Switzerland) Basel	1	1	2
(England) Chelsea	2	3	5

Final
15 May – Amsterdam
(Portugal) Benfica	1
(England) Chelsea	2

== Round of 32 ==
The draw for the round of 32 was held on 20 December 2012.

=== Summary ===
The first legs were played on 14 February, and the second legs were played on 21 February 2013.

Team 1	Agg.	Team 2	1st leg	2nd leg
BATE Borisov (Belarus)	0–1	(Turkey) Fenerbahçe	0–0	0–1
Internazionale (Italy)	5–0	(Romania) CFR Cluj	2–0	3–0
Levante (Spain)	4–0	(Greece) Olympiacos	3–0	1–0
Zenit Saint Petersburg (Russia)	3–3 (a)	(England) Liverpool	2–0	1–3
Dynamo Kyiv (Ukraine)	1–2	(France) Bordeaux	1–1	0–1
Bayer Leverkusen (Germany)	1–3	(Portugal) Benfica	0–1	1–2
Newcastle United (England)	1–0	(Ukraine) Metalist Kharkiv	0–0	1–0
VfB Stuttgart (Germany)	3–1	(Belgium) Genk	1–1	2–0
Atlético Madrid (Spain)	1–2	(Russia) Rubin Kazan	0–2	1–0
Ajax (Netherlands)	2–2 (2–4 p)	(Romania) Steaua București	2–0	0–2 (a.e.t.)
Basel (Switzerland)	3–1	(Ukraine) Dnipro Dnipropetrovsk	2–0	1–1
Anzhi Makhachkala (Russia)	4–2	(Germany) Hannover 96	3–1	1–1
Sparta Prague (Czech Republic)	1–2	(England) Chelsea	0–1	1–1
Borussia Mönchengladbach (Germany)	3–5	(Italy) Lazio	3–3	0–2
Tottenham Hotspur (England)	3–2	(France) Lyon	2–1	1–1
Napoli (Italy)	0–5	(Czech Republic) Viktoria Plzeň	0–3	0–2

=== Matches ===
14 February 2013
19:00

BATE Borisov (Belarus)	0–0	(Turkey) Fenerbahçe
	Report

Neman Stadium, Grodno (Note: BATE Borisov played their home match at Neman Stadium, Grodno instead of their regular stadium, Haradski Stadium, Barysaw.)
Attendance: 8,021
Referee: Alan Kelly (Republic of Ireland)
21 February 2013
21:05

Fenerbahçe (Turkey)	1–0	(Belarus) BATE Borisov
Baroni 45+1' (pen.)	Report

Şükrü Saracoğlu Stadium, Istanbul
Attendance: 0 (Note: The Fenerbahçe v BATE Borisov match was played behind closed doors due to the punishment handed to Fenerbahçe by UEFA following incidents at their group stage match against Borussia Mönchengladbach on 6 December 2012.)
Referee: Antony Gautier (France)

Fenerbahçe won 1–0 on aggregate.

14 February 2013
21:05

Internazionale (Italy)	2–0	(Romania) CFR Cluj
Palacio 20', 87'	Report

San Siro, Milan
Attendance: 14,790
Referee: Michael Koukoulakis (Greece)
21 February 2013
19:00

CFR Cluj (Romania)	0–3	(Italy) Internazionale
	Report	Guarín 22', 45+2'; Benassi 89'

Stadionul Dr. Constantin Rădulescu, Cluj-Napoca
Attendance: 11,027
Referee: Paweł Gil (Poland)

Internazionale won 5–0 on aggregate.

14 February 2013
19:00

Levante (Spain)	3–0	(Greece) Olympiacos
Ríos 10'; Barkero 40' (pen.); Martins 56'	Report

Estadi Ciutat de València, Valencia
Attendance: 12,850
Referee: Manuel Gräfe (Germany)
21 February 2013
21:05

Olympiacos (Greece)	0–1	(Spain) Levante
	Report	Martins 9'

Karaiskakis Stadium, Piraeus
Attendance: 29,174
Referee: Matej Jug (Slovenia)

Levante won 4–0 on aggregate.

14 February 2013
18:00

Zenit Saint Petersburg (Russia)	2–0	(England) Liverpool
Hulk 69'; Semak 72'	Report

Petrovsky Stadium, Saint Petersburg
Attendance: 19,748
Referee: Carlos Velasco Carballo (Spain)
21 February 2013
21:05

Liverpool (England)	3–1	(Russia) Zenit Saint Petersburg
Suárez 28', 59'; Allen 43'	Report	Hulk 19'

Anfield, Liverpool
Attendance: 43,026
Referee: Björn Kuipers (Netherlands)

3–3 on aggregate; Zenit Saint Petersburg won on away goals.

14 February 2013
19:00

Dynamo Kyiv (Ukraine)	1–1	(France) Bordeaux
Haruna 20'	Report	Obraniak 23'

Olympic Stadium, Kyiv
Attendance: 24,953
Referee: Alexandru Tudor (Romania)
21 February 2013
21:05

Bordeaux (France)	1–0	(Ukraine) Dynamo Kyiv
Diabaté 41'	Report

Stade Chaban-Delmas, Bordeaux
Attendance: 11,889
Referee: Ivan Bebek (Croatia)

Bordeaux won 2–1 on aggregate.

14 February 2013
19:00

Bayer Leverkusen (Germany)	0–1	(Portugal) Benfica
	Report	Cardozo 61'

BayArena, Leverkusen
Attendance: 25,375
Referee: Antonio Mateu Lahoz (Spain)
21 February 2013
21:05

Benfica (Portugal)	2–1	(Germany) Bayer Leverkusen
John 60'; Matić 77'	Report	Schürrle 75'

Estádio da Luz, Lisbon
Attendance: 37,357
Referee: Pavel Královec (Czech Republic)

Benfica won 3–1 on aggregate.

14 February 2013
21:05

Newcastle United (England)	0–0	(Ukraine) Metalist Kharkiv
	Report

St James' Park, Newcastle upon Tyne
Attendance: 30,157
Referee: Tom Harald Hagen (Norway)
21 February 2013
19:00

Metalist Kharkiv (Ukraine)	0–1	(England) Newcastle United
	Report	Sh. Ameobi 64' (pen.)

Metalist Stadium, Kharkiv
Attendance: 39,973
Referee: Serge Gumienny (Belgium)

Newcastle United won 1–0 on aggregate.

14 February 2013
21:05

VfB Stuttgart (Germany)	1–1	(Belgium) Genk
Gentner 42'	Report	Plet 90+1'

Mercedes-Benz Arena, Stuttgart
Attendance: 15,200
Referee: Jorge Sousa (Portugal)
21 February 2013
19:00

Genk (Belgium)	0–2	(Germany) VfB Stuttgart
	Report	Boka 45'; Gentner 59'

Cristal Arena, Genk
Attendance: 16,796
Referee: Alon Yefet (Israel)

VfB Stuttgart won 3–1 on aggregate.

14 February 2013
21:05

Atlético Madrid (Spain)	0–2	(Russia) Rubin Kazan
	Report	Karadeniz 6'; Orbaiz 90+5'

Vicente Calderón, Madrid
Attendance: 21,334
Referee: István Vad (Hungary)
21 February 2013
18:00

Rubin Kazan (Russia)	0–1	(Spain) Atlético Madrid
	Report	Falcao 84'

Luzhniki Stadium, Moscow (Note: Rubin Kazan played their home match at Luzhniki Stadium, Moscow instead of their regular stadium, Tsentralnyi Stadion, Kazan.)
Attendance: 2,593
Referee: Ovidiu Hațegan (Romania)

Rubin Kazan won 2–1 on aggregate.

14 February 2013
19:00

Ajax (Netherlands)	2–0	(Romania) Steaua București
Alderweireld 28'; Van Rhijn 48'	Report

Amsterdam Arena, Amsterdam
Attendance: 51,493
Referee: Stanislav Todorov (Bulgaria)
21 February 2013
21:05

Steaua București (Romania)	2–0 (a.e.t.)	(Netherlands) Ajax
Latovlevici 38'; Chiricheș 76'	Report
Penalties
Rusescu (penalty scored); Nikolić (penalty scored); Filip (penalty scored); Latovlevici (penalty scored)	4–2	(penalty scored) Eriksen; (penalty missed) Schöne; (penalty scored) De Jong; (penalty missed) Moisander

Arena Națională, Bucharest
Attendance: 35,423
Referee: Paolo Tagliavento (Italy)

2–2 on aggregate; Steaua București won 4–2 on penalties.

14 February 2013
21:05

Basel (Switzerland)	2–0	(Ukraine) Dnipro Dnipropetrovsk
Stocker 23'; Streller 67'	Report

St. Jakob-Park, Basel
Attendance: 8,314
Referee: Svein Oddvar Moen (Norway)
21 February 2013
19:00

Dnipro Dnipropetrovsk (Ukraine)	1–1	(Switzerland) Basel
Seleznyov 76' (pen.)	Report	Schär 81' (pen.)

Dnipro Arena, Dnipropetrovsk
Attendance: 26,501
Referee: Deniz Aytekin (Germany)

Basel won 3–1 on aggregate.

14 February 2013
18:00

Anzhi Makhachkala (Russia)	3–1	(Germany) Hannover 96
Eto'o 34'; Ahmedov 48'; Boussoufa 64'	Report	Huszti 22'

Luzhniki Stadium, Moscow (Note: Anzhi Makhachkala played their home match at Luzhniki Stadium, Moscow instead of their regular stadium, Dynamo Stadium, Makhachkala, due to security issues involving the city of Makhachkala and the autonomous republic of Dagestan.)
Attendance: 6,676
Referee: Marijo Strahonja (Croatia)
21 February 2013
21:05

Hannover 96 (Germany)	1–1	(Russia) Anzhi Makhachkala
Pinto 70'	Report	Traoré 90+9'

AWD-Arena, Hanover
Attendance: 27,500
Referee: Jonas Eriksson (Sweden)

Anzhi Makhachkala won 4–2 on aggregate.

14 February 2013
19:00

Sparta Prague (Czech Republic)	0–1	(England) Chelsea
	Report	Oscar 82'

Generali Arena, Prague
Attendance: 18,952
Referee: Daniele Orsato (Italy)
21 February 2013
21:05

Chelsea (England)	1–1	(Czech Republic) Sparta Prague
Hazard 90+2'	Report	Lafata 17'

Stamford Bridge, London
Attendance: 38,642
Referee: Aleksandar Stavrev (Macedonia)

Chelsea won 2–1 on aggregate.

14 February 2013
21:05

Borussia Mönchengladbach (Germany)	3–3	(Italy) Lazio
Stranzl 17' (pen.); Marx 84' (pen.); Arango 88'	Report	Floccari 57'; Kozák 64', 90+4'

Borussia-Park, Mönchengladbach
Attendance: 46,279
Referee: Sergei Karasev (Russia)
21 February 2013
19:00

Lazio (Italy)	2–0	(Germany) Borussia Mönchengladbach
Candreva 10'; González 33'	Report

Stadio Olimpico, Rome
Attendance: 27,174
Referee: Hüseyin Göçek (Turkey)

Lazio won 5–3 on aggregate.

14 February 2013
21:05

Tottenham Hotspur (England)	2–1	(France) Lyon
Bale 45', 90+3'	Report	Umtiti 55'

White Hart Lane, London
Attendance: 31,762
Referee: Pedro Proença (Portugal)
21 February 2013
19:00

Lyon (France)	1–1	(England) Tottenham Hotspur
Gonalons 17'	Report	Dembélé 90'

Stade de Gerland, Lyon
Attendance: 38,761
Referee: Wolfgang Stark (Germany)

Tottenham Hotspur won 3–2 on aggregate.

14 February 2013
19:00

Napoli (Italy)	0–3	(Czech Republic) Viktoria Plzeň
	Report	Darida 28'; Rajtoral 79'; Tecl 90'

Stadio San Paolo, Naples
Attendance: 13,606
Referee: Pol van Boekel (Netherlands)
21 February 2013
21:05

Viktoria Plzeň (Czech Republic)	2–0	(Italy) Napoli
Kovařík 51'; Tecl 74'	Report

Stadion města Plzně, Plzeň
Attendance: 11,067
Referee: Viktor Kassai (Hungary)

Viktoria Plzeň won 5–0 on aggregate.

== Round of 16 ==
The draw for the round of 16 was held on 20 December 2012, immediately after the round of 32 draw.

=== Summary ===
The first legs were played on 7 March, and the second legs were played on 14 March 2013.

Team 1	Agg.	Team 2	1st leg	2nd leg
Viktoria Plzeň (Czech Republic)	1–2	(Turkey) Fenerbahçe	0–1	1–1
Benfica (Portugal)	4–2	(France) Bordeaux	1–0	3–2
Anzhi Makhachkala (Russia)	0–1	(England) Newcastle United	0–0	0–1
VfB Stuttgart (Germany)	1–5	(Italy) Lazio	0–2	1–3
Tottenham Hotspur (England)	4–4 (a)	(Italy) Internazionale	3–0	1–4 (a.e.t.)
Levante (Spain)	0–2	(Russia) Rubin Kazan	0–0	0–2 (a.e.t.)
Basel (Switzerland)	2–1	(Russia) Zenit Saint Petersburg	2–0	0–1
Steaua București (Romania)	2–3	(England) Chelsea	1–0	1–3

=== Matches ===
7 March 2013
19:00

Viktoria Plzeň (Czech Republic)	0–1	(Turkey) Fenerbahçe
	Report	Webó 81'

Stadion města Plzně, Plzeň
Attendance: 11,701
Referee: Gianluca Rocchi (Italy)
14 March 2013
21:05

Fenerbahçe (Turkey)	1–1	(Czech Republic) Viktoria Plzeň
Uçan 44'	Report	Darida 61'

Şükrü Saracoğlu Stadium, Istanbul
Attendance: 0 (Note: The Fenerbahçe v Viktoria Plzeň match was played behind closed doors due to the punishment handed to Fenerbahçe by UEFA following incidents at their round of 32 match second leg against BATE Borisov on 21 February 2013.)
Referee: Manuel Gräfe (Germany)

Fenerbahçe won 2–1 on aggregate.

7 March 2013
21:05

Benfica (Portugal)	1–0	(France) Bordeaux
Carrasso 21' (o.g.)	Report

Estádio da Luz, Lisbon
Attendance: 33,248
Referee: Alon Yefet (Israel)
14 March 2013
21:05

Bordeaux (France)	2–3	(Portugal) Benfica
Diabaté 74'; Jardel 90+1' (o.g.)	Report	Jardel 30'; Cardozo 75', 90+2'

Stade Chaban-Delmas, Bordeaux
Attendance: 26,609
Referee: Ovidiu Haţegan (Romania)

Benfica won 4–2 on aggregate.

7 March 2013
18:00

Anzhi Makhachkala (Russia)	0–0	(England) Newcastle United
	Report

Luzhniki Stadium, Moscow
Attendance: 9,948
Referee: István Vad (Hungary)
14 March 2013
21:05

Newcastle United (England)	1–0	(Russia) Anzhi Makhachkala
Cissé 90+3'	Report

St James' Park, Newcastle upon Tyne
Attendance: 45,487
Referee: Deniz Aytekin (Germany)

Newcastle United won 1–0 on aggregate.

7 March 2013
19:00

VfB Stuttgart (Germany)	0–2	(Italy) Lazio
	Report	Ederson 21'; Onazi 56'

Mercedes-Benz Arena, Stuttgart
Attendance: 28,750
Referee: Alexandru Tudor (Romania)
14 March 2013
21:05

Lazio (Italy)	3–1	(Germany) VfB Stuttgart
Kozák 6', 8', 87'	Report	Hajnal 62'

Stadio Olimpico, Rome
Attendance: 0 (Note: The Lazio's home matches against VfB Stuttgart (round of 16) and Fenerbahçe (quarter-finals) were played behind closed doors due to the punishment handed to Lazio by UEFA following incidents at their round of 32 match second leg against Borussia Mönchengladbach on 21 February 2013.)
Referee: Tom Harald Hagen (Norway)

Lazio won 5–1 on aggregate.

7 March 2013
21:05

Tottenham Hotspur (England)	3–0	(Italy) Internazionale
Bale 6'; Sigurðsson 18'; Vertonghen 53'	Report

White Hart Lane, London
Attendance: 34,353
Referee: Antonio Mateu Lahoz (Spain)
14 March 2013
19:00

Internazionale (Italy)	4–1 (a.e.t.)	(England) Tottenham Hotspur
Cassano 20'; Palacio 52'; Gallas 75' (o.g.); Álvarez 110'	Report	Adebayor 96'

San Siro, Milan
Attendance: 18,241
Referee: Ivan Bebek (Croatia)

4–4 on aggregate; Tottenham Hotspur won on away goals.

7 March 2013
21:05

Levante (Spain)	0–0	(Russia) Rubin Kazan
	Report

Estadi Ciutat de València, Valencia
Attendance: 12,825
Referee: Antony Gautier (France)
14 March 2013
18:00

Rubin Kazan (Russia)	2–0 (a.e.t.)	(Spain) Levante
Rondón 100'; Dyadyun 112'	Report

Luzhniki Stadium, Moscow
Attendance: 1,889
Referee: Aleksandar Stavrev (Macedonia)

Rubin Kazan won 2–0 on aggregate.

7 March 2013
21:05

Basel (Switzerland)	2–0	(Russia) Zenit Saint Petersburg
Díaz 83'; A. Frei 90+4' (pen.)	Report

St. Jakob-Park, Basel
Attendance: 15,008
Referee: Daniele Orsato (Italy)
14 March 2013
18:00

Zenit Saint Petersburg (Russia)	1–0	(Switzerland) Basel
Witsel 30'	Report

Petrovsky Stadium, Saint Petersburg
Attendance: 16,751
Referee: Paweł Gil (Poland)

Basel won 2–1 on aggregate.

7 March 2013
19:00

Steaua București (Romania)	1–0	(England) Chelsea
Rusescu 34' (pen.)	Report

Arena Națională, Bucharest
Attendance: 50,016
Referee: Sergei Karasev (Russia)
14 March 2013
21:05

Chelsea (England)	3–1	(Romania) Steaua București
Mata 34'; Terry 58'; Torres 71'	Report	Chiricheș 45+1'

Stamford Bridge, London
Attendance: 28,817
Referee: Stéphane Lannoy (France)

Chelsea won 3–2 on aggregate.

== Quarter-finals ==
The draw for the quarter-finals was held on 15 March 2013.

=== Summary ===
The first legs were played on 4 April, and the second legs were played on 11 April 2013.

Team 1	Agg.	Team 2	1st leg	2nd leg
Chelsea (England)	5–4	(Russia) Rubin Kazan	3–1	2–3
Tottenham Hotspur (England)	4–4 (1–4 p)	(Switzerland) Basel	2–2	2–2 (a.e.t.)
Fenerbahçe (Turkey)	3–1	(Italy) Lazio	2–0	1–1
Benfica (Portugal)	4–2	(England) Newcastle United	3–1	1–1

=== Matches ===
4 April 2013
21:05

Chelsea (England)	3–1	(Russia) Rubin Kazan
Torres 16', 70'; Moses 32'	Report	Natcho 41' (pen.)

Stamford Bridge, London
Attendance: 32,994
Referee: Gianluca Rocchi (Italy)
11 April 2013
18:00

Rubin Kazan (Russia)	3–2	(England) Chelsea
Marcano 51'; Karadeniz 62'; Natcho 75' (pen.)	Report	Torres 5'; Moses 55'

Luzhniki Stadium, Moscow
Attendance: 18,410
Referee: Fırat Aydınus (Turkey)

Chelsea won 5–4 on aggregate.

4 April 2013
21:05

Tottenham Hotspur (England)	2–2	(Switzerland) Basel
Adebayor 40'; Sigurðsson 58'	Report	Stocker 30'; F. Frei 34'

White Hart Lane, London
Attendance: 32,136
Referee: Milorad Mažić (Serbia)
11 April 2013
21:05

Basel (Switzerland)	2–2 (a.e.t.)	(England) Tottenham Hotspur
Salah 27'; Dragović 49'	Report	Dempsey 23', 83'
Penalties
Schär (penalty scored); Streller (penalty scored); F. Frei (penalty scored); Díaz (penalty scored)	4–1	(penalty missed) Huddlestone; (penalty scored) Sigurðsson; (penalty missed) Adebayor

St. Jakob-Park, Basel
Attendance: 36,500
Referee: Olegário Benquerença (Portugal)

4–4 on aggregate; Basel won 4–1 on penalties.

4 April 2013
21:05

Fenerbahçe (Turkey)	2–0	(Italy) Lazio
Webó 78' (pen.); Kuyt 90+1'	Report

Şükrü Saracoğlu Stadium, Istanbul
Attendance: 43,629
Referee: William Collum (Scotland)
11 April 2013
21:05

Lazio (Italy)	1–1	(Turkey) Fenerbahçe
Lulić 60'	Report	Erkin 73'

Stadio Olimpico, Rome
Attendance: 0
Referee: Pavel Královec (Czech Republic)

Fenerbahçe won 3–1 on aggregate.

4 April 2013
21:05

Benfica (Portugal)	3–1	(England) Newcastle United
Rodrigo 25'; Lima 65'; Cardozo 71' (pen.)	Report	Cissé 12'

Estádio da Luz, Lisbon
Attendance: 44,133
Referee: Antony Gautier (France)
11 April 2013
21:05

Newcastle United (England)	1–1	(Portugal) Benfica
Cissé 71'	Report	Salvio 90+2'

St James' Park, Newcastle upon Tyne
Attendance: 52,157
Referee: Ivan Bebek (Croatia)

Benfica won 4–2 on aggregate.

== Semi-finals ==
The draw for the semi-finals was held on 12 April 2013.

=== Summary ===
The first legs were played on 25 April, and the second legs were played on 2 May 2013.

Team 1	Agg.	Team 2	1st leg	2nd leg
Fenerbahçe (Turkey)	2–3	(Portugal) Benfica	1–0	1–3
Basel (Switzerland)	2–5	(England) Chelsea	1–2	1–3

=== Matches ===
25 April 2013
21:05

Fenerbahçe (Turkey)	1–0	(Portugal) Benfica
Korkmaz 72'	Report

Şükrü Saracoğlu Stadium, Istanbul
Attendance: 43,936
Referee: Milorad Mažić (Serbia)
2 May 2013
21:05

Benfica (Portugal)	3–1	(Turkey) Fenerbahçe
Gaitán 9'; Cardozo 35', 66'	Report	Kuyt 23' (pen.)

Estádio da Luz, Lisbon
Attendance: 55,402
Referee: Stéphane Lannoy (France)

Benfica won 3–2 on aggregate.

25 April 2013
21:05

Basel (Switzerland)	1–2	(England) Chelsea
Schär 87' (pen.)	Report	Moses 12'; David Luiz 90+4'

St. Jakob-Park, Basel
Attendance: 36,000
Referee: Pavel Královec (Czech Republic)
2 May 2013
21:05

Chelsea (England)	3–1	(Switzerland) Basel
Torres 50'; Moses 52'; David Luiz 59'	Report	Salah 45+1'

Stamford Bridge, London
Attendance: 39,409
Referee: Jonas Eriksson (Sweden)

Chelsea won 5–2 on aggregate.

== Final ==
The final was played on 15 May 2013 at the Amsterdam Arena in Amsterdam, Netherlands. A draw was held on 12 April 2013, after the semi-final draw, to determine the "home" team for administrative purposes.

15 May 2013
20:45

Benfica (Portugal)	1–2	(England) Chelsea
Cardozo 68' (pen.)	Report	Torres 60'; Ivanović 90+3'

Amsterdam Arena, Amsterdam
Attendance: 46,163
Referee: Björn Kuipers (Netherlands)
