= 2012–13 UEFA Champions League knockout phase =

The knockout phase of the 2012–13 UEFA Champions League began on 12 February and concluded on 25 May 2013 with the final at Wembley Stadium in London, England.

Times are CET/CEST, (Note: CET (UTC+1) for matches to 13 March 2013, and CEST (UTC+2) for matches from 2 April 2013.) as listed by UEFA (local times, if different, are in parentheses).

== Round and draw dates ==
All draws were held at UEFA headquarters in Nyon, Switzerland.

| Round | Draw date | First leg | Second leg |
|---|---|---|---|
| Round of 16 | 20 December 2012, 11:30 | 12–13 & 19–20 February 2013 | 5–6 & 12–13 March 2013 |
| Quarter-finals | 15 March 2013, 12:00 | 2–3 April 2013 | 9–10 April 2013 |
| Semi-finals | 12 April 2013, 12:00 | 23–24 April 2013 | 30 April – 1 May 2013 |
| Final | 12 April 2013, 12:00 | 25 May 2013 at Wembley Stadium, London | |

== Format ==
The knockout phase involved the sixteen teams who finished in the top two in each of their groups in the group stage.

Each tie in the knockout phase, apart from the final, was played over two legs, with each team playing one leg at home. The team that had the higher aggregate score over the two legs progressed to the next round. In the event that aggregate scores finished level, the away goals rule was applied, i.e. the team that scored more goals away from home over the two legs progressed. If away goals were also equal, then thirty minutes of extra time were played, divided into two fifteen-minutes halves. The away goals rule was again applied after extra time, i.e. if there were goals scored during extra time and the aggregate score was still level, the visiting team qualified by virtue of more away goals scored. If no goals were scored during extra time, the tie was decided by a penalty shoot-out. In the final, the tie was played as a single match. If scores were level at the end of normal time in the final, extra time was played, followed by penalties if scores remained tied.

The mechanism of the draws for each round was as follows:

- In the draw for the round of 16, the eight group winners were seeded, and the eight group runners-up were unseeded. A seeded team was drawn against an unseeded team, with the seeded team hosting the second leg. Teams from the same group or the same association cannot be drawn against each other.
- In the draws for the quarter-finals onwards, there were no seedings, and teams from the same group or the same association could be drawn with each other.

== Qualified teams ==
Key to colours
Seeded in round of 16 draw
Unseeded in round of 16 draw

| Group | Winners | Runners-up |
|---|---|---|
| A | (France) Paris Saint-Germain | (Portugal) Porto |
| B | (Germany) Schalke 04 | (England) Arsenal |
| C | (Spain) Málaga | (Italy) Milan |
| D | (Germany) Borussia Dortmund | (Spain) Real Madrid |
| E | (Italy) Juventus | (Ukraine) Shakhtar Donetsk |
| F | (Germany) Bayern Munich | (Spain) Valencia |
| G | (Spain) Barcelona | (Scotland) Celtic |
| H | (England) Manchester United | (Turkey) Galatasaray |

== Bracket ==
Round of 16
(Portugal) Porto | 1 | 0 | 1
(Spain) Málaga | 0 | 2 | 2
(Ukraine) Shakhtar Donetsk | 2 | 0 | 2
(Germany) Borussia Dortmund | 2 | 3 | 5
(Spain) Real Madrid | 1 | 2 | 3
(England) Manchester United | 1 | 1 | 2
(Turkey) Galatasaray | 1 | 3 | 4
(Germany) Schalke 04 | 1 | 2 | 3
(England) Arsenal | 1 | 2 | 3
(Germany) Bayern Munich (a) | 3 | 0 | 3
(Scotland) Celtic | 0 | 0 | 0
(Italy) Juventus | 3 | 2 | 5
(Spain) Valencia | 1 | 1 | 2
(France) Paris Saint-Germain | 2 | 1 | 3
(Italy) Milan | 2 | 0 | 2
(Spain) Barcelona | 0 | 4 | 4

Quarter-finals
(Spain) Málaga | 0 | 2 | 2
(Germany) Borussia Dortmund | 0 | 3 | 3
(Spain) Real Madrid | 3 | 2 | 5
(Turkey) Galatasaray | 0 | 3 | 3
(Germany) Bayern Munich | 2 | 2 | 4
(Italy) Juventus | 0 | 0 | 0
(France) Paris Saint-Germain | 2 | 1 | 3
(Spain) Barcelona (a) | 2 | 1 | 3

Semi-finals
(Germany) Borussia Dortmund | 4 | 0 | 4
(Spain) Real Madrid | 1 | 2 | 3
(Germany) Bayern Munich | 4 | 3 | 7
(Spain) Barcelona | 0 | 0 | 0

Final
25 May – London
(Germany) Borussia Dortmund | 1
(Germany) Bayern Munich | 2

== Round of 16 ==
The draw for the round of 16 was held on 20 December 2012.

=== Summary ===
The first legs were played on 12, 13, 19 and 20 February, and the second legs were played on 5, 6, 12 and 13 March 2013.

A moment of silence was held before the Borussia Dortmund v Shakhtar Donetsk second leg to commemorate the victims of the crash of South Airlines Flight 8971, which had been filled mostly with football fans heading for the match.

| Team 1 | Agg. | Team 2 | 1st leg | 2nd leg |
|---|---|---|---|---|
| Galatasaray (Turkey) | 4–3 | (Germany) Schalke 04 | 1–1 | 3–2 |
| Celtic (Scotland) | 0–5 | (Italy) Juventus | 0–3 | 0–2 |
| Arsenal (England) | 3–3 (a) | (Germany) Bayern Munich | 1–3 | 2–0 |
| Shakhtar Donetsk (Ukraine) | 2–5 | (Germany) Borussia Dortmund | 2–2 | 0–3 |
| Milan (Italy) | 2–4 | (Spain) Barcelona | 2–0 | 0–4 |
| Real Madrid (Spain) | 3–2 | (England) Manchester United | 1–1 | 2–1 |
| Valencia (Spain) | 2–3 | (France) Paris Saint-Germain | 1–2 | 1–1 |
| Porto (Portugal) | 1–2 | (Spain) Málaga | 1–0 | 0–2 |

=== Matches ===
20 February 2013
20:45 (21:45 UTC+2)

| Galatasaray (Turkey) | 1–1 | (Germany) Schalke 04 |
|---|---|---|
| Yılmaz B. 12' | Report | Jones 45' |

Türk Telekom Arena, Istanbul
Attendance: 50,734
Referee: William Collum (Scotland)
12 March 2013
20:45

| Schalke 04 (Germany) | 2–3 | (Turkey) Galatasaray |
|---|---|---|
| Neustädter 17'; Michel Bastos 63' | Report | Altıntop 37'; Yılmaz B. 42'; Umut Bulut 90+5' |

Veltins-Arena, Gelsenkirchen
Attendance: 54,142
Referee: Jonas Eriksson (Sweden)

Galatasaray won 4–3 on aggregate.

12 February 2013
20:45 (19:45 UTC+0)

| Celtic (Scotland) | 0–3 | (Italy) Juventus |
|---|---|---|
| | Report | Matri 3'; Marchisio 77'; Vučinić 83' |

Celtic Park, Glasgow
Attendance: 57,917
Referee: Alberto Undiano Mallenco (Spain)
6 March 2013
20:45

| Juventus (Italy) | 2–0 | (Scotland) Celtic |
|---|---|---|
| Matri 24'; Quagliarella 65' | Report |

Juventus Stadium, Turin
Attendance: 39,011
Referee: Fırat Aydınus (Turkey)

Juventus won 5–0 on aggregate.

19 February 2013
20:45 (19:45 UTC+0)

| Arsenal (England) | 1–3 | (Germany) Bayern Munich |
|---|---|---|
| Podolski 55' | Report | Kroos 7'; Müller 21'; Mandžukić 77' |

Emirates Stadium, London
Attendance: 59,974
Referee: Svein Oddvar Moen (Norway)
13 March 2013
20:45

| Bayern Munich (Germany) | 0–2 | (England) Arsenal |
|---|---|---|
| | Report | Giroud 3'; Koscielny 86' |

Allianz Arena, Munich
Attendance: 68,000
Referee: Pavel Královec (Czech Republic)

3–3 on aggregate; Bayern Munich won on away goals.

13 February 2013
20:45 (21:45 UTC+2)

| Shakhtar Donetsk (Ukraine) | 2–2 | (Germany) Borussia Dortmund |
|---|---|---|
| Srna 31'; Douglas Costa 68' | Report | Lewandowski 41'; Hummels 87' |

Donbas Arena, Donetsk
Attendance: 49,050
Referee: Howard Webb (England)
5 March 2013
20:45

| Borussia Dortmund (Germany) | 3–0 | (Ukraine) Shakhtar Donetsk |
|---|---|---|
| Santana 31'; Götze 37'; Błaszczykowski 59' | Report |

Signal Iduna Park, Dortmund
Attendance: 65,413
Referee: Damir Skomina (Slovenia)

Borussia Dortmund won 5–2 on aggregate.

20 February 2013
20:45

| Milan (Italy) | 2–0 | (Spain) Barcelona |
|---|---|---|
| Boateng 56'; Muntari 81' | Report |

San Siro, Milan
Attendance: 79,532
Referee: Craig Thomson (Scotland)
12 March 2013
20:45

| Barcelona (Spain) | 4–0 | (Italy) Milan |
|---|---|---|
| Messi 5', 39'; Villa 55'; Alba 90+2' | Report |

Camp Nou, Barcelona
Attendance: 94,944
Referee: Viktor Kassai (Hungary)

Barcelona won 4–2 on aggregate.

13 February 2013
20:45

| Real Madrid (Spain) | 1–1 | (England) Manchester United |
|---|---|---|
| Ronaldo 30' | Report | Welbeck 20' |

Santiago Bernabéu, Madrid
Attendance: 79,429
Referee: Felix Brych (Germany)
5 March 2013
20:45 (19:45 UTC+0)

| Manchester United (England) | 1–2 | (Spain) Real Madrid |
|---|---|---|
| Ramos 48' (o.g.) | Report | Modrić 66'; Ronaldo 69' |

Old Trafford, Manchester
Attendance: 74,959
Referee: Cüneyt Çakır (Turkey)

Real Madrid won 3–2 on aggregate.

12 February 2013
20:45

| Valencia (Spain) | 1–2 | (France) Paris Saint-Germain |
|---|---|---|
| Rami 90' | Report | Lavezzi 10'; Pastore 43' |

Mestalla, Valencia
Attendance: 36,000
Referee: Paolo Tagliavento (Italy)
6 March 2013
20:45

| Paris Saint-Germain (France) | 1–1 | (Spain) Valencia |
|---|---|---|
| Lavezzi 66' | Report | Jonas 55' |

Parc des Princes, Paris
Attendance: 44,867
Referee: Milorad Mažić (Serbia)

Paris Saint-Germain won 3–2 on aggregate.

19 February 2013
20:45 (19:45 UTC+0)

| Porto (Portugal) | 1–0 | (Spain) Málaga |
|---|---|---|
| Moutinho 56' | Report |

Estádio do Dragão, Porto
Attendance: 42,209
Referee: Mark Clattenburg (England)
13 March 2013
20:45

| Málaga (Spain) | 2–0 | (Portugal) Porto |
|---|---|---|
| Isco 43'; Santa Cruz 77' | Report |

La Rosaleda, Málaga
Attendance: 27,451
Referee: Nicola Rizzoli (Italy)

Málaga won 2–1 on aggregate.

== Quarter-finals ==
The draw for the quarter-finals was held on 15 March 2013.

=== Summary ===
The first legs were played on 2 and 3 April, and the second legs were played on 9 and 10 April 2013.

| Team 1 | Agg. | Team 2 | 1st leg | 2nd leg |
|---|---|---|---|---|
| Málaga (Spain) | 2–3 | (Germany) Borussia Dortmund | 0–0 | 2–3 |
| Real Madrid (Spain) | 5–3 | (Turkey) Galatasaray | 3–0 | 2–3 |
| Paris Saint-Germain (France) | 3–3 (a) | (Spain) Barcelona | 2–2 | 1–1 |
| Bayern Munich (Germany) | 4–0 | (Italy) Juventus | 2–0 | 2–0 |

=== Matches ===
3 April 2013
20:45

| Málaga (Spain) | 0–0 | (Germany) Borussia Dortmund |
|---|---|---|
| | Report |

La Rosaleda, Málaga
Attendance: 28,548
Referee: Jonas Eriksson (Sweden)
9 April 2013
20:45

| Borussia Dortmund (Germany) | 3–2 | (Spain) Málaga |
|---|---|---|
| Lewandowski 40'; Reus 90+1'; Santana 90+3' | Report | Joaquín 25'; Eliseu 82' |

Signal Iduna Park, Dortmund
Attendance: 65,829
Referee: Craig Thomson (Scotland)

Borussia Dortmund won 3–2 on aggregate.

3 April 2013
20:45

| Real Madrid (Spain) | 3–0 | (Turkey) Galatasaray |
|---|---|---|
| Ronaldo 9'; Benzema 29'; Higuaín 73' | Report |

Santiago Bernabéu, Madrid
Attendance: 76,462
Referee: Svein Oddvar Moen (Norway)
9 April 2013
20:45 (21:45 UTC+3)

| Galatasaray (Turkey) | 3–2 | (Spain) Real Madrid |
|---|---|---|
| Eboué 57'; Sneijder 70'; Drogba 72' | Report | Ronaldo 7', 90+2' |

Türk Telekom Arena, Istanbul
Attendance: 49,975
Referee: Stéphane Lannoy (France)

Real Madrid won 5–3 on aggregate.

2 April 2013
20:45

| Paris Saint-Germain (France) | 2–2 | (Spain) Barcelona |
|---|---|---|
| Ibrahimović 79'; Matuidi 90+4' | Report | Messi 38'; Xavi 89' (pen.) |

Parc des Princes, Paris
Attendance: 45,336
Referee: Wolfgang Stark (Germany)
10 April 2013
20:45

| Barcelona (Spain) | 1–1 | (France) Paris Saint-Germain |
|---|---|---|
| Pedro 71' | Report | Pastore 50' |

Camp Nou, Barcelona
Attendance: 96,022
Referee: Björn Kuipers (Netherlands)

3–3 on aggregate; Barcelona won on away goals.

2 April 2013
20:45

| Bayern Munich (Germany) | 2–0 | (Italy) Juventus |
|---|---|---|
| Alaba 1'; Müller 63' | Report |

Allianz Arena, Munich
Attendance: 68,000
Referee: Mark Clattenburg (England)
10 April 2013
20:45

| Juventus (Italy) | 0–2 | (Germany) Bayern Munich |
|---|---|---|
| | Report | Mandžukić 64'; Pizarro 90+1' |

Juventus Stadium, Turin
Attendance: 40,823
Referee: Carlos Velasco Carballo (Spain)

Bayern Munich won 4–0 on aggregate.

== Semi-finals ==
The draw for the semi-finals was held on 12 April 2013.

=== Summary ===
The first legs were played on 23 and 24 April, and the second legs were played on 30 April and 1 May 2013.

| Team 1 | Agg. | Team 2 | 1st leg | 2nd leg |
|---|---|---|---|---|
| Bayern Munich (Germany) | 7–0 | (Spain) Barcelona | 4–0 | 3–0 |
| Borussia Dortmund (Germany) | 4–3 | (Spain) Real Madrid | 4–1 | 0–2 |

=== Matches ===
23 April 2013
20:45

| Bayern Munich (Germany) | 4–0 | (Spain) Barcelona |
|---|---|---|
| Müller 25', 82'; Gómez 49'; Robben 73' | Report |

Allianz Arena, Munich
Attendance: 68,000
Referee: Viktor Kassai (Hungary)
1 May 2013
20:45

| Barcelona (Spain) | 0–3 | (Germany) Bayern Munich |
|---|---|---|
| | Report | Robben 48'; Piqué 72' (o.g.); Müller 76' |

Camp Nou, Barcelona
Attendance: 95,877
Referee: Damir Skomina (Slovenia)

Bayern Munich won 7–0 on aggregate.

24 April 2013
20:45

| Borussia Dortmund (Germany) | 4–1 | (Spain) Real Madrid |
|---|---|---|
| Lewandowski 8', 50', 55', 66' (pen.) | Report | Ronaldo 43' |

Signal Iduna Park, Dortmund
Attendance: 65,829
Referee: Björn Kuipers (Netherlands)
30 April 2013
20:45

| Real Madrid (Spain) | 2–0 | (Germany) Borussia Dortmund |
|---|---|---|
| Benzema 83'; Ramos 88' | Report |

Santiago Bernabéu, Madrid
Attendance: 69,429
Referee: Howard Webb (England)

Borussia Dortmund won 4–3 on aggregate.

== Final ==
The final was played on 25 May 2013 at Wembley Stadium in London, England. A draw was held on 12 April 2013, after the semi-final draw, to determine the "home" team for administrative purposes.

25 May 2013
20:45 (19:45 UTC+1)

| Borussia Dortmund (Germany) | 1–2 | (Germany) Bayern Munich |
|---|---|---|
| Gündoğan 68' (pen.) | Report | Mandžukić 60'; Robben 89' |

Wembley Stadium, London
Attendance: 86,298
Referee: Nicola Rizzoli (Italy)
