= 2012–13 UEFA Champions League group stage =

International football competition

The 2012–13 UEFA Champions League group stage featured 32 teams: the 22 automatic qualifiers and the 10 winners of the play-off round (five through the Champions Route, five through the League Route).

The teams were drawn into eight groups of four, and played each other home-and-away in a round-robin format. The top two teams in each group advanced to the round of 16, while the third-placed teams dropped down to the Europa League round of 32.

== Teams ==
The draw for the group stage was held on 30 August 2012, 17:45 CEST (UTC+2), at Grimaldi Forum, Monaco.

Teams were seeded into four pots based on their 2012 UEFA club coefficients. The title holders, Chelsea, were automatically seeded into Pot 1. Pot 1 holds teams ranked 1–12, Pot 2 holds teams ranked 13–31, Pot 3 holds teams ranked 32–60, while Pot 4 holds teams ranked 63–171.

Key to colours in group tables
Group winners and runners-up advanced to the round of 16
Third-placed teams entered the Europa League at the round of 32

Pot 1
Team	Notes	Coeff.
(England) Chelsea		135.882
(Spain) Barcelona		157.837
(England) Manchester United		141.882
(Germany) Bayern Munich		133.037
(Spain) Real Madrid		121.837
(England) Arsenal		113.882
(Portugal) Porto		98.069
(Italy) Milan		89.996

Pot 2
Team	Notes	Coeff.
(Spain) Valencia		89.837
(Portugal) Benfica		87.069
(Ukraine) Shakhtar Donetsk		84.026
(Russia) Zenit Saint Petersburg		79.066
(Germany) Schalke 04		78.037
(England) Manchester City		63.882
(Portugal) Braga		63.069
(Ukraine) Dynamo Kyiv		62.026

Pot 3
Team	Notes	Coeff.
(Greece) Olympiacos		61.420
(Netherlands) Ajax		58.103
(Belgium) Anderlecht		48.480
(Italy) Juventus		46.996
(Russia) Spartak Moscow		46.066
(France) Paris Saint-Germain		45.835
(France) Lille		38.835
(Turkey) Galatasaray		38.310

Pot 4
Team	Notes	Coeff.
(Scotland) Celtic		32.728
(Germany) Borussia Dortmund		31.037
(Belarus) BATE Borisov		29.641
(Croatia) Dinamo Zagreb		24.774
(Romania) CFR Cluj		18.764
(Spain) Málaga		16.837
(France) Montpellier		11.835
(Denmark) Nordsjælland		8.005

Notes

1. ^{TH} Champions League title holders (automatic top seed of pot 1)
2. ^{CR} Qualified through play-off round (Champions Route)
3. ^{LR} Qualified through play-off round (League Route)

Each group contained one team from each of the four pots, with the restriction that teams from the same national association cannot be drawn against each other. Moreover, the draw was controlled for teams from the same association in order to split the teams evenly into the two sets of groups (A–D, E–H) for maximum television coverage.

The fixtures were decided after the draw. On each matchday, four groups played their matches on Tuesday, while the other four groups played their matches on Wednesday, with the two sets of groups (A–D, E–H) alternating between each matchday. There were other restrictions, e.g., teams from the same city (e.g. Manchester United and Manchester City) in general did not play at home on the same matchday (UEFA tries to avoid teams from the same city playing at home on the same day or on consecutive days), and Russian teams did not play at home on the last matchday due to cold weather.

== Tiebreakers ==
The teams are ranked according to points (3 points for a win, 1 point for a tie, 0 points for a loss). If two or more teams are equal on points on completion of the group matches, the following criteria are applied to determine the rankings:

1. higher number of points obtained in the group matches played among the teams in question;
2. superior goal difference from the group matches played among the teams in question;
3. higher number of goals scored in the group matches played among the teams in question;
4. higher number of goals scored away from home in the group matches played among the teams in question;
5. If, after applying criteria 1) to 4) to several teams, two teams still have an equal ranking, criteria 1) to 4) are reapplied exclusively to the matches between the two teams in question to determine their final rankings. If this procedure does not lead to a decision, criteria 6) to 8) apply;
6. superior goal difference from all group matches played;
7. higher number of goals scored from all group matches played;
8. higher number of coefficient points accumulated by the club in question, as well as its association, over the previous five seasons.

== Groups ==
The matchdays were 18–19 September, 2–3 October, 23–24 October, 6–7 November, 20–21 November, and 4–5 December 2012.

Times are CET/CEST, (Note: CET (UTC+1) for matches from 6 November 2012, and CEST (UTC+2) for matches to 24 October 2012) as listed by UEFA (local times, if different, are in parentheses).

=== Group A ===
Pos	Team	Pld	W	D	L	GF	GA	GD	Pts	Qualification	PAR	POR	DKV	DZG
1	(France) Paris Saint-Germain	6	5	0	1	14	3	+11	15	Advance to knockout phase	—	2–1	4–1	4–0
2	(Portugal) Porto	6	4	1	1	10	4	+6	13	Advance to knockout phase	1–0	—	3–2	3–0
3	(Ukraine) Dynamo Kyiv	6	1	2	3	6	10	−4	5	Transfer to Europa League	0–2	0–0	—	2–0
4	(Croatia) Dinamo Zagreb	6	0	1	5	1	14	−13	1		0–2	0–2	1–1	—

Source: Soccerway
18 September 2012
20:45

Dinamo Zagreb (Croatia)	0–2	(Portugal) Porto
	Report	L. González 41'; Defour 90+2'

Stadion Maksimir, Zagreb
Attendance: 4,683
Referee: Daniele Orsato (Italy)
18 September 2012
20:45

Paris Saint-Germain (France)	4–1	(Ukraine) Dynamo Kyiv
Ibrahimović 19' (pen.); Thiago Silva 29'; Alex 32'; Pastore 90+1'	Report	Miguel Veloso 87'

Parc des Princes, Paris
Attendance: 42,536
Referee: Björn Kuipers (Netherlands)

3 October 2012
20:45 (21:45 UTC+3)

Dynamo Kyiv (Ukraine)	2–0	(Croatia) Dinamo Zagreb
Husyev 3'; Pivarić 33' (o.g.)	Report

NSC Olimpiyskiy, Kyiv
Attendance: 47,804
Referee: Martin Atkinson (England)
3 October 2012
20:45 (19:45 UTC+1)

Porto (Portugal)	1–0	(France) Paris Saint-Germain
J. Rodríguez 83'	Report

Estádio do Dragão, Porto
Attendance: 36,509
Referee: Howard Webb (England)

24 October 2012
20:45 (19:45 UTC+1)

Porto (Portugal)	3–2	(Ukraine) Dynamo Kyiv
Varela 15'; Martínez 36', 78'	Report	Husyev 21'; Brown 72'

Estádio do Dragão, Porto
Attendance: 29,317
Referee: Pavel Královec (Czech Republic)
24 October 2012
20:45

Dinamo Zagreb (Croatia)	0–2	(France) Paris Saint-Germain
	Report	Ibrahimović 33'; Ménez 43'

Stadion Maksimir, Zagreb
Attendance: 9,326
Referee: Fırat Aydınus (Turkey)

6 November 2012
20:45 (21:45 UTC+2)

Dynamo Kyiv (Ukraine)	0–0	(Portugal) Porto
	Report

NSC Olimpiyskiy, Kyiv
Attendance: 34,386
Referee: Alberto Undiano Mallenco (Spain)
6 November 2012
20:45

Paris Saint-Germain (France)	4–0	(Croatia) Dinamo Zagreb
Alex 16'; Matuidi 61'; Ménez 65'; Hoarau 80'	Report

Parc des Princes, Paris
Attendance: 41,060
Referee: Paweł Gil (Poland)

21 November 2012
20:45 (19:45 UTC+0)

Porto (Portugal)	3–0	(Croatia) Dinamo Zagreb
L. González 20'; Moutinho 67'; Varela 85'	Report

Estádio do Dragão, Porto
Attendance: 27,603
Referee: Paolo Tagliavento (Italy)
21 November 2012
20:45 (21:45 UTC+2)

Dynamo Kyiv (Ukraine)	0–2	(France) Paris Saint-Germain
	Report	Lavezzi 45', 52'

NSC Olimpiyskiy, Kyiv
Attendance: 36,712
Referee: Wolfgang Stark (Germany)

4 December 2012
20:45

Dinamo Zagreb (Croatia)	1–1	(Ukraine) Dynamo Kyiv
Krstanović 90+5' (pen.)	Report	Yarmolenko 45+1'

Stadion Maksimir, Zagreb
Attendance: 3,663
Referee: Stanislav Todorov (Bulgaria)
4 December 2012
20:45

Paris Saint-Germain (France)	2–1	(Portugal) Porto
Thiago Silva 29'; Lavezzi 61'	Report	Martínez 33'

Parc des Princes, Paris
Attendance: 45,512
Referee: Craig Thomson (Scotland)

=== Group B ===
Pos	Team	Pld	W	D	L	GF	GA	GD	Pts	Qualification	SCH	ARS	OLY	MPL
1	(Germany) Schalke 04	6	3	3	0	10	6	+4	12	Advance to knockout phase	—	2–2	1–0	2–2
2	(England) Arsenal	6	3	1	2	10	8	+2	10	Advance to knockout phase	0–2	—	3–1	2–0
3	(Greece) Olympiacos	6	3	0	3	9	9	0	9	Transfer to Europa League	1–2	2–1	—	3–1
4	(France) Montpellier	6	0	2	4	6	12	−6	2		1–1	1–2	1–2	—

Source: Soccerway
18 September 2012
20:45

Montpellier (France)	1–2	(England) Arsenal
Belhanda 9' (pen.)	Report	Podolski 16'; Gervinho 18'

Stade de la Mosson, Montpellier
Attendance: 27,522
Referee: Carlos Velasco Carballo (Spain)
18 September 2012
20:45 (21:45 UTC+3)

Olympiacos (Greece)	1–2	(Germany) Schalke 04
Abdoun 58'	Report	Höwedes 41'; Huntelaar 59'

Georgios Karaiskakis Stadium, Piraeus
Attendance: 30,922
Referee: David Fernández Borbalán (Spain)

3 October 2012
20:45

Schalke 04 (Germany)	2–2	(France) Montpellier
Draxler 26'; Huntelaar 53' (pen.)	Report	Aït-Fana 13'; Camara 90'

Veltins-Arena, Gelsenkirchen
Attendance: 50,004
Referee: Sergei Karasev (Russia)
3 October 2012
20:45 (19:45 UTC+1)

Arsenal (England)	3–1	(Greece) Olympiacos
Gervinho 42'; Podolski 56'; Ramsey 90+4'	Report	Mitroglou 45+1'

Emirates Stadium, London
Attendance: 60,034
Referee: Svein Oddvar Moen (Norway)

24 October 2012
20:45 (19:45 UTC+1)

Arsenal (England)	0–2	(Germany) Schalke 04
	Report	Huntelaar 76'; Afellay 86'

Emirates Stadium, London
Attendance: 60,049
Referee: Jonas Eriksson (Sweden)
24 October 2012
20:45

Montpellier (France)	1–2	(Greece) Olympiacos
Charbonnier 49'	Report	Torosidis 73'; Mitroglou 90+1'

Stade de la Mosson, Montpellier
Attendance: 22,834
Referee: Daniele Orsato (Italy)

6 November 2012
20:45

Schalke 04 (Germany)	2–2	(England) Arsenal
Huntelaar 45+2'; Farfán 67'	Report	Walcott 18'; Giroud 26'

Veltins-Arena, Gelsenkirchen
Attendance: 54,142
Referee: Nicola Rizzoli (Italy)
6 November 2012
20:45 (21:45 UTC+2)

Olympiacos (Greece)	3–1	(France) Montpellier
Paulo Machado 4'; Greco 80'; Mitroglou 82'	Report	Belhanda 66' (pen.)

Georgios Karaiskakis Stadium, Piraeus
Attendance: 28,217
Referee: Marijo Strahonja (Croatia)

21 November 2012
20:45 (19:45 UTC+0)

Arsenal (England)	2–0	(France) Montpellier
Wilshere 49'; Podolski 63'	Report

Emirates Stadium, London
Attendance: 59,760
Referee: Fırat Aydınus (Turkey)
21 November 2012
20:45

Schalke 04 (Germany)	1–0	(Greece) Olympiacos
Fuchs 77'	Report

Veltins-Arena, Gelsenkirchen
Attendance: 52,254
Referee: Björn Kuipers (Netherlands)

4 December 2012
20:45

Montpellier (France)	1–1	(Germany) Schalke 04
Herrera 59'	Report	Höwedes 56'

Stade de la Mosson, Montpellier
Attendance: 23,142
Referee: Antonio Mateu Lahoz (Spain)
4 December 2012
20:45 (21:45 UTC+2)

Olympiacos (Greece)	2–1	(England) Arsenal
Maniatis 64'; Mitroglou 73'	Report	Rosický 38'

Georgios Karaiskakis Stadium, Piraeus
Attendance: 28,128
Referee: Alberto Undiano Mallenco (Spain)

=== Group C ===
Pos	Team	Pld	W	D	L	GF	GA	GD	Pts	Qualification	MLG	MIL	ZEN	AND
1	(Spain) Málaga	6	3	3	0	12	5	+7	12	Advance to knockout phase	—	1–0	3–0	2–2
2	(Italy) Milan	6	2	2	2	7	6	+1	8	Advance to knockout phase	1–1	—	0–1	0–0
3	(Russia) Zenit Saint Petersburg	6	2	1	3	6	9	−3	7	Transfer to Europa League	2–2	2–3	—	1–0
4	(Belgium) Anderlecht	6	1	2	3	4	9	−5	5		0–3	1–3	1–0	—

Source: Soccerway
18 September 2012
20:45

Málaga (Spain)	3–0	(Russia) Zenit Saint Petersburg
Isco 3', 76'; Saviola 13'	Report

La Rosaleda, Málaga
Attendance: 23,670
Referee: Mark Clattenburg (England)
18 September 2012
20:45

Milan (Italy)	0–0	(Belgium) Anderlecht
	Report

San Siro, Milan
Attendance: 27,593
Referee: William Collum (Scotland)

3 October 2012
18:00 (20:00 UTC+4)

Zenit Saint Petersburg (Russia)	2–3	(Italy) Milan
Hulk 45+2'; Shirokov 49'	Report	Emanuelson 13'; El Shaarawy 16'; Hubočan 75' (o.g.)

Petrovsky Stadium, Saint Petersburg
Attendance: 21,703
Referee: Felix Brych (Germany)
3 October 2012
20:45

Anderlecht (Belgium)	0–3	(Spain) Málaga
	Report	Eliseu 45+1', 64'; Joaquín 57' (pen.)

Constant Vanden Stock Stadium, Brussels
Attendance: 15,711
Referee: Viktor Kassai (Hungary)

24 October 2012
18:00 (20:00 UTC+4)

Zenit Saint Petersburg (Russia)	1–0	(Belgium) Anderlecht
Kerzhakov 72' (pen.)	Report

Petrovsky Stadium, Saint Petersburg
Attendance: 18,034
Referee: Ivan Bebek (Croatia)
24 October 2012
20:45

Málaga (Spain)	1–0	(Italy) Milan
Joaquín 64'	Report

La Rosaleda, Málaga
Attendance: 27,683
Referee: Pedro Proença (Portugal)

6 November 2012
20:45

Anderlecht (Belgium)	1–0	(Russia) Zenit Saint Petersburg
Mbokani 17'	Report

Constant Vanden Stock Stadium, Brussels
Attendance: 16,437
Referee: Antony Gautier (France)
6 November 2012
20:45

Milan (Italy)	1–1	(Spain) Málaga
Pato 73'	Report	Eliseu 40'

San Siro, Milan
Attendance: 30,891
Referee: Howard Webb (England)

21 November 2012
18:00 (21:00 UTC+4)

Zenit Saint Petersburg (Russia)	2–2	(Spain) Málaga
Danny 49'; Fayzulin 87'	Report	Buonanotte 8'; Seba Fernández 9'

Petrovsky Stadium, Saint Petersburg
Attendance: 18,347
Referee: Olegário Benquerença (Portugal)
21 November 2012
20:45

Anderlecht (Belgium)	1–3	(Italy) Milan
De Sutter 78'	Report	El Shaarawy 47'; Mexès 71'; Pato 90+1'

Constant Vanden Stock Stadium, Brussels
Attendance: 19,803
Referee: Damir Skomina (Slovenia)

4 December 2012
20:45

Málaga (Spain)	2–2	(Belgium) Anderlecht
Duda 45', 61'	Report	Jovanović 50'; Mbokani 89'

La Rosaleda, Málaga
Attendance: 21,769
Referee: Deniz Aytekin (Germany)
4 December 2012
20:45

Milan (Italy)	0–1	(Russia) Zenit Saint Petersburg
	Report	Danny 35'

San Siro, Milan
Attendance: 29,508
Referee: Tony Chapron (France)

=== Group D ===
Pos	Team	Pld	W	D	L	GF	GA	GD	Pts	Qualification	DOR	RMA	AJX	MCI
1	(Germany) Borussia Dortmund	6	4	2	0	11	5	+6	14	Advance to knockout phase	—	2–1	1–0	1–0
2	(Spain) Real Madrid	6	3	2	1	15	9	+6	11	Advance to knockout phase	2–2	—	4–1	3–2
3	(Netherlands) Ajax	6	1	1	4	8	16	−8	4	Transfer to Europa League	1–4	1–4	—	3–1
4	(England) Manchester City	6	0	3	3	7	11	−4	3		1–1	1–1	2–2	—

Source: Soccerway
18 September 2012
20:45

Borussia Dortmund (Germany)	1–0	(Netherlands) Ajax
Lewandowski 87'	Report

Signal Iduna Park, Dortmund
Attendance: 65,829
Referee: Paolo Tagliavento (Italy)
18 September 2012
20:45

Real Madrid (Spain)	3–2	(England) Manchester City
Marcelo 76'; Benzema 87'; Ronaldo 90'	Report	Džeko 68'; Kolarov 85'

Santiago Bernabéu, Madrid
Attendance: 70,381
Referee: Damir Skomina (Slovenia)

3 October 2012
20:45 (19:45 UTC+1)

Manchester City (England)	1–1	(Germany) Borussia Dortmund
Balotelli 90' (pen.)	Report	Reus 61'

Etihad Stadium, Manchester
Attendance: 43,657
Referee: Pavel Královec (Czech Republic)
3 October 2012
20:45

Ajax (Netherlands)	1–4	(Spain) Real Madrid
Moisander 56'	Report	Ronaldo 42', 79', 81'; Benzema 48'

Amsterdam ArenA, Amsterdam
Attendance: 49,491
Referee: Jonas Eriksson (Sweden)

24 October 2012
20:45

Ajax (Netherlands)	3–1	(England) Manchester City
De Jong 45'; Moisander 57'; Eriksen 68'	Report	Nasri 22'

Amsterdam ArenA, Amsterdam
Attendance: 45,743
Referee: Svein Oddvar Moen (Norway)
24 October 2012
20:45

Borussia Dortmund (Germany)	2–1	(Spain) Real Madrid
Lewandowski 36'; Schmelzer 64'	Report	Ronaldo 38'

Signal Iduna Park, Dortmund
Attendance: 65,829
Referee: Viktor Kassai (Hungary)

6 November 2012
20:45 (19:45 UTC+0)

Manchester City (England)	2–2	(Netherlands) Ajax
Y. Touré 22'; Agüero 74'	Report	De Jong 10', 17'

Etihad Stadium, Manchester
Attendance: 40,222
Referee: Peter Rasmussen (Denmark)
6 November 2012
20:45

Real Madrid (Spain)	2–2	(Germany) Borussia Dortmund
Pepe 34'; Özil 89'	Report	Reus 28'; Arbeloa 45' (o.g.)

Santiago Bernabéu, Madrid
Attendance: 74,932
Referee: Cüneyt Çakır (Turkey)

21 November 2012
20:45

Ajax (Netherlands)	1–4	(Germany) Borussia Dortmund
Hoesen 87'	Report	Reus 8'; Götze 36'; Lewandowski 41', 67'

Amsterdam ArenA, Amsterdam
Attendance: 47,500
Referee: Pedro Proença (Portugal)
21 November 2012
20:45 (19:45 UTC+0)

Manchester City (England)	1–1	(Spain) Real Madrid
Agüero 73' (pen.)	Report	Benzema 10'

Etihad Stadium, Manchester
Attendance: 45,740
Referee: Gianluca Rocchi (Italy)

4 December 2012
20:45

Borussia Dortmund (Germany)	1–0	(England) Manchester City
Schieber 57'	Report

Signal Iduna Park, Dortmund
Attendance: 65,829
Referee: Milorad Mažić (Serbia)
4 December 2012
20:45

Real Madrid (Spain)	4–1	(Netherlands) Ajax
Ronaldo 13'; Callejón 28', 88'; Kaká 49'	Report	Boerrigter 59'

Santiago Bernabéu, Madrid
Attendance: 57,245
Referee: Pavel Královec (Czech Republic)

=== Group E ===
Pos	Team	Pld	W	D	L	GF	GA	GD	Pts	Qualification	JUV	SHK	CHE	NOR
1	(Italy) Juventus	6	3	3	0	12	4	+8	12	Advance to knockout phase	—	1–1	3–0	4–0
2	(Ukraine) Shakhtar Donetsk	6	3	1	2	12	8	+4	10 (Note: Tied on head-to-head points (3) and head-to-head goal difference (0). Head-to-head away goals: Shakhtar Donetsk 2, Chelsea 1.)	Advance to knockout phase	0–1	—	2–1	2–0
3	(England) Chelsea	6	3	1	2	16	10	+6	10	Transfer to Europa League	2–2	3–2	—	6–1
4	(Denmark) Nordsjælland	6	0	1	5	4	22	−18	1		1–1	2–5	0–4	—

Source: Soccerway
Notes:
19 September 2012
20:45 (21:45 UTC+3)

Shakhtar Donetsk (Ukraine)	2–0	(Denmark) Nordsjælland
Mkhitaryan 44', 76'	Report

Donbas Arena, Donetsk
Attendance: 45,816
Referee: Paweł Gil (Poland)
19 September 2012
20:45 (19:45 UTC+1)

Chelsea (England)	2–2	(Italy) Juventus
Oscar 31', 33'	Report	Vidal 38'; Quagliarella 80'

Stamford Bridge, London
Attendance: 40,918
Referee: Pedro Proença (Portugal)

2 October 2012
20:45

Juventus (Italy)	1–1	(Ukraine) Shakhtar Donetsk
Bonucci 25'	Report	Alex Teixeira 23'

Juventus Stadium, Turin
Attendance: 25,599
Referee: Bas Nijhuis (Netherlands)
2 October 2012
20:45

Nordsjælland (Denmark)	0–4	(England) Chelsea
	Report	Mata 33', 82'; David Luiz 79'; Ramires 89'

Parken Stadium, Copenhagen (Note: Nordsjælland played their home matches at Parken Stadium, Copenhagen instead of their regular stadium, Farum Park, Farum.)
Attendance: 25,120
Referee: Marijo Strahonja (Croatia)

23 October 2012
20:45

Nordsjælland (Denmark)	1–1	(Italy) Juventus
Beckmann 50'	Report	Vučinić 81'

Parken Stadium, Copenhagen
Attendance: 22,404
Referee: Deniz Aytekin (Germany)
23 October 2012
20:45 (21:45 UTC+3)

Shakhtar Donetsk (Ukraine)	2–1	(England) Chelsea
Alex Teixeira 3'; Fernandinho 52'	Report	Oscar 88'

Donbas Arena, Donetsk
Attendance: 51,435
Referee: Damir Skomina (Slovenia)

7 November 2012
20:45

Juventus (Italy)	4–0	(Denmark) Nordsjælland
Marchisio 6'; Vidal 23'; Giovinco 37'; Quagliarella 75'	Report

Juventus Stadium, Turin
Attendance: 27,789
Referee: Aleksandar Stavrev (Macedonia)
7 November 2012
20:45 (19:45 UTC+0)

Chelsea (England)	3–2	(Ukraine) Shakhtar Donetsk
Torres 6'; Oscar 40'; Moses 90+4'	Report	Willian 9', 47'

Stamford Bridge, London
Attendance: 41,067
Referee: Carlos Velasco Carballo (Spain)

20 November 2012
20:45

Nordsjælland (Denmark)	2–5	(Ukraine) Shakhtar Donetsk
Nordstrand 24'; Lorentzen 29'	Report	Luiz Adriano 26', 53', 81'; Willian 44', 50'

Parken Stadium, Copenhagen
Attendance: 17,054
Referee: Antony Gautier (France)
20 November 2012
20:45

Juventus (Italy)	3–0	(England) Chelsea
Quagliarella 38'; Vidal 61'; Giovinco 90+1'	Report

Juventus Stadium, Turin
Attendance: 39,670
Referee: Cüneyt Çakır (Turkey)

5 December 2012
20:45 (21:45 UTC+2)

Shakhtar Donetsk (Ukraine)	0–1	(Italy) Juventus
	Report	Kucher 56' (o.g.)

Donbas Arena, Donetsk
Attendance: 50,104
Referee: Jonas Eriksson (Sweden)
5 December 2012
20:45 (19:45 UTC+0)

Chelsea (England)	6–1	(Denmark) Nordsjælland
David Luiz 38' (pen.); Torres 45+2', 56'; Cahill 51'; Mata 63'; Oscar 71'	Report	John 46'

Stamford Bridge, London
Attendance: 40,084
Referee: Bas Nijhuis (Netherlands)

=== Group F ===
Pos	Team	Pld	W	D	L	GF	GA	GD	Pts	Qualification	BAY	VAL	BATE	LIL
1	(Germany) Bayern Munich	6	4	1	1	15	7	+8	13 (Note: Head-to-head points: Bayern Munich 4, Valencia 1.)	Advance to knockout phase	—	2–1	4–1	6–1
2	(Spain) Valencia	6	4	1	1	12	5	+7	13	Advance to knockout phase	1–1	—	4–2	2–0
3	(Belarus) BATE Borisov	6	2	0	4	9	15	−6	6	Transfer to Europa League	3–1	0–3	—	0–2
4	(France) Lille	6	1	0	5	4	13	−9	3		0–1	0–1	1–3	—

Source: Soccerway
Notes:
19 September 2012
20:45

Lille (France)	1–3	(Belarus) BATE Borisov
Chedjou 60'	Report	A. Volodko 6'; Rodionov 20'; Olekhnovich 43'

Grand Stade Lille Métropole, Villeneuve-d'Ascq
Attendance: 38,122
Referee: Marcin Borski (Poland)
19 September 2012
20:45

Bayern Munich (Germany)	2–1	(Spain) Valencia
Schweinsteiger 38'; Kroos 76'	Report	Nelson Valdez 90+1'

Allianz Arena, Munich
Attendance: 68,000
Referee: Fırat Aydınus (Turkey)

2 October 2012
20:45

Valencia (Spain)	2–0	(France) Lille
Jonas 38', 75'	Report

Mestalla, Valencia
Attendance: 28,517
Referee: Gianluca Rocchi (Italy)
2 October 2012
20:45 (21:45 UTC+3)

BATE Borisov (Belarus)	3–1	(Germany) Bayern Munich
Pavlov 23'; Rodionov 78'; Renan Bressan 90+4'	Report	Ribéry 90+1'

Dynamo, Minsk (Note: BATE Borisov played their home matches at Dynamo, Minsk instead of their regular stadium, Gradski Stadium, Borisov as it did not meet UEFA criteria.)
Attendance: 24,636
Referee: Aleksandar Stavrev (Macedonia)

23 October 2012
20:45 (21:45 UTC+3)

BATE Borisov (Belarus)	0–3	(Spain) Valencia
	Report	Soldado 45+1' (pen.), 55', 69'

Dynamo, Minsk
Attendance: 29,180
Referee: Craig Thomson (Scotland)
23 October 2012
20:45

Lille (France)	0–1	(Germany) Bayern Munich
	Report	Müller 20' (pen.)

Grand Stade Lille Métropole, Villeneuve-d'Ascq
Attendance: 45,259
Referee: Martin Atkinson (England)

7 November 2012
20:45

Valencia (Spain)	4–2	(Belarus) BATE Borisov
Jonas 26'; Soldado 29' (pen.); Feghouli 51', 86'	Report	Renan Bressan 53'; Mozolevski 83'

Mestalla, Valencia
Attendance: 22,795
Referee: Tom Harald Hagen (Norway)
7 November 2012
20:45

Bayern Munich (Germany)	6–1	(France) Lille
Schweinsteiger 5'; Pizarro 18', 28', 33'; Robben 23'; Kroos 66'	Report	Kalou 57'

Allianz Arena, Munich
Attendance: 68,000
Referee: Ovidiu Haţegan (Romania)

20 November 2012
18:00 (20:00 UTC+3)

BATE Borisov (Belarus)	0–2	(France) Lille
	Report	Sidibé 14'; Bruno 31'

Dynamo, Minsk
Attendance: 22,810
Referee: Marijo Strahonja (Croatia)
20 November 2012
20:45

Valencia (Spain)	1–1	(Germany) Bayern Munich
Feghouli 77'	Report	Müller 82'

Mestalla, Valencia
Attendance: 35,407
Referee: Howard Webb (England)

5 December 2012
20:45

Lille (France)	0–1	(Spain) Valencia
	Report	Jonas 36' (pen.)

Grand Stade Lille Métropole, Villeneuve-d'Ascq
Attendance: 40,036
Referee: Aleksandar Stavrev (Macedonia)
5 December 2012
20:45

Bayern Munich (Germany)	4–1	(Belarus) BATE Borisov
Gómez 22'; Müller 54'; Shaqiri 65'; Alaba 83'	Report	Filipenko 89'

Allianz Arena, Munich
Attendance: 68,000
Referee: William Collum (Scotland)

=== Group G ===
Pos	Team	Pld	W	D	L	GF	GA	GD	Pts	Qualification	BAR	CEL	BEN	SPM
1	(Spain) Barcelona	6	4	1	1	11	5	+6	13	Advance to knockout phase	—	2–1	0–0	3–2
2	(Scotland) Celtic	6	3	1	2	9	8	+1	10	Advance to knockout phase	2–1	—	0–0	2–1
3	(Portugal) Benfica	6	2	2	2	5	5	0	8	Transfer to Europa League	0–2	2–1	—	2–0
4	(Russia) Spartak Moscow	6	1	0	5	7	14	−7	3		0–3	2–3	2–1	—

Source: Soccerway
19 September 2012
20:45

Barcelona (Spain)	3–2	(Russia) Spartak Moscow
Tello 14'; Messi 71', 80'	Report	Dani Alves 29' (o.g.); Rômulo 58'

Camp Nou, Barcelona
Attendance: 73,580
Referee: Milorad Mažić (Serbia)
19 September 2012
20:45 (19:45 UTC+1)

Celtic (Scotland)	0–0	(Portugal) Benfica
	Report

Celtic Park, Glasgow
Attendance: 57,759
Referee: Nicola Rizzoli (Italy)

2 October 2012
18:00 (20:00 UTC+4)

Spartak Moscow (Russia)	2–3	(Scotland) Celtic
Emenike 41', 48'	Report	Hooper 12'; Kombarov D. 71' (o.g.); Samaras 90'

Luzhniki Stadium, Moscow
Attendance: 43,351
Referee: Tony Chapron (France)
2 October 2012
20:45 (19:45 UTC+1)

Benfica (Portugal)	0–2	(Spain) Barcelona
	Report	Sánchez 6'; Fàbregas 55'

Estádio da Luz, Lisbon
Attendance: 63,847
Referee: Cüneyt Çakır (Turkey)

23 October 2012
18:00 (20:00 UTC+4)

Spartak Moscow (Russia)	2–1	(Portugal) Benfica
Rafael Carioca 3'; Jardel 43' (o.g.)	Report	Lima 33'

Luzhniki Stadium, Moscow
Attendance: 41,237
Referee: Mark Clattenburg (England)
23 October 2012
20:45

Barcelona (Spain)	2–1	(Scotland) Celtic
Iniesta 45'; Jordi Alba 90+4'	Report	Samaras 18'

Camp Nou, Barcelona
Attendance: 77,781
Referee: Gianluca Rocchi (Italy)

7 November 2012
20:45 (19:45 UTC+0)

Benfica (Portugal)	2–0	(Russia) Spartak Moscow
Cardozo 55', 69'	Report

Estádio da Luz, Lisbon
Attendance: 36,448
Referee: Florian Meyer (Germany)
7 November 2012
20:45 (19:45 UTC+0)

Celtic (Scotland)	2–1	(Spain) Barcelona
Wanyama 21'; Watt 83'	Report	Messi 90+1'

Celtic Park, Glasgow
Attendance: 58,841
Referee: Björn Kuipers (Netherlands)

20 November 2012
18:00 (21:00 UTC+4)

Spartak Moscow (Russia)	0–3	(Spain) Barcelona
	Report	Dani Alves 16'; Messi 27', 39'

Luzhniki Stadium, Moscow
Attendance: 67,325
Referee: Ivan Bebek (Croatia)
20 November 2012
20:45 (19:45 UTC+0)

Benfica (Portugal)	2–1	(Scotland) Celtic
John 7'; Garay 71'	Report	Samaras 32'

Estádio da Luz, Lisbon
Attendance: 47,065
Referee: Viktor Kassai (Hungary)

5 December 2012
20:45

Barcelona (Spain)	0–0	(Portugal) Benfica
	Report

Camp Nou, Barcelona
Attendance: 50,659
Referee: Svein Oddvar Moen (Norway)
5 December 2012
20:45 (19:45 UTC+0)

Celtic (Scotland)	2–1	(Russia) Spartak Moscow
Hooper 21'; Commons 81' (pen.)	Report	Ari 39'

Celtic Park, Glasgow
Attendance: 59,168
Referee: Felix Brych (Germany)

=== Group H ===
Pos	Team	Pld	W	D	L	GF	GA	GD	Pts	Qualification	MUN	GAL	CLJ	BRA
1	(England) Manchester United	6	4	0	2	9	6	+3	12	Advance to knockout phase	—	1–0	0–1	3–2
2	(Turkey) Galatasaray	6	3	1	2	7	6	+1	10 (Note: Head-to-head points: Galatasaray 4, CFR Cluj 1.)	Advance to knockout phase	1–0	—	1–1	0–2
3	(Romania) CFR Cluj	6	3	1	2	9	7	+2	10	Transfer to Europa League	1–2	1–3	—	3–1
4	(Portugal) Braga	6	1	0	5	7	13	−6	3		1–3	1–2	0–2	—

Source: Soccerway
Notes:
19 September 2012
20:45 (19:45 UTC+1)

Manchester United (England)	1–0	(Turkey) Galatasaray
Carrick 7'	Report

Old Trafford, Manchester
Attendance: 74,653
Referee: Wolfgang Stark (Germany)
19 September 2012
20:45 (19:45 UTC+1)

Braga (Portugal)	0–2	(Romania) CFR Cluj
	Report	Rafael Bastos 19', 34'

Municipal de Braga, Braga
Attendance: 10,922
Referee: Peter Rasmussen (Denmark)

2 October 2012
20:45 (21:45 UTC+3)

CFR Cluj (Romania)	1–2	(England) Manchester United
Kapetanos 14'	Report	Van Persie 29', 49'

Stadionul Dr. Constantin Rădulescu, Cluj-Napoca
Attendance: 16,259
Referee: Alberto Undiano Mallenco (Spain)
2 October 2012
20:45 (21:45 UTC+3)

Galatasaray (Turkey)	0–2	(Portugal) Braga
	Report	Rúben Micael 27'; Alan 90+4'

Türk Telekom Arena, Istanbul
Attendance: 46,987
Referee: Tom Harald Hagen (Norway)

23 October 2012
20:45 (21:45 UTC+3)

Galatasaray (Turkey)	1–1	(Romania) CFR Cluj
Burak 77'	Report	Nounkeu 19' (o.g.)

Türk Telekom Arena, Istanbul
Attendance: 39,013
Referee: Paolo Tagliavento (Italy)
23 October 2012
20:45 (19:45 UTC+1)

Manchester United (England)	3–2	(Portugal) Braga
Hernández 25', 75'; Evans 62'	Report	Alan 2', 20'

Old Trafford, Manchester
Attendance: 73,195
Referee: Milorad Mažić (Serbia)

7 November 2012
20:45 (21:45 UTC+2)

CFR Cluj (Romania)	1–3	(Turkey) Galatasaray
Sougou 53'	Report	Burak 18', 61', 74'

Stadionul Dr. Constantin Rădulescu, Cluj-Napoca
Attendance: 16,232
Referee: William Collum (Scotland)
7 November 2012
20:45 (19:45 UTC+0)

Braga (Portugal)	1–3	(England) Manchester United
Alan 49' (pen.)	Report	Van Persie 80'; Rooney 84' (pen.); Hernández 90+2'

Municipal de Braga, Braga
Attendance: 15,388
Referee: Felix Brych (Germany)

20 November 2012
20:45 (21:45 UTC+2)

Galatasaray (Turkey)	1–0	(England) Manchester United
Burak 53'	Report

Türk Telekom Arena, Istanbul
Attendance: 50,278
Referee: Carlos Velasco Carballo (Spain)
20 November 2012
20:45 (21:45 UTC+2)

CFR Cluj (Romania)	3–1	(Portugal) Braga
Rui Pedro 7', 15', 33'	Report	Alan 17'

Stadionul Dr. Constantin Rădulescu, Cluj-Napoca
Attendance: 14,635
Referee: Sergei Karasev (Russia)

5 December 2012
20:45 (19:45 UTC+0)

Manchester United (England)	0–1	(Romania) CFR Cluj
	Report	Luís Alberto 56'

Old Trafford, Manchester
Attendance: 71,521
Referee: Daniele Orsato (Italy)
5 December 2012
20:45 (19:45 UTC+0)

Braga (Portugal)	1–2	(Turkey) Galatasaray
Mossoró 32'	Report	Burak 58'; Aydın Yılmaz 78'

Municipal de Braga, Braga
Attendance: 8,964
Referee: Nicola Rizzoli (Italy)
