= Svein Oddvar Moen =

Norwegian football referee (born 1979)

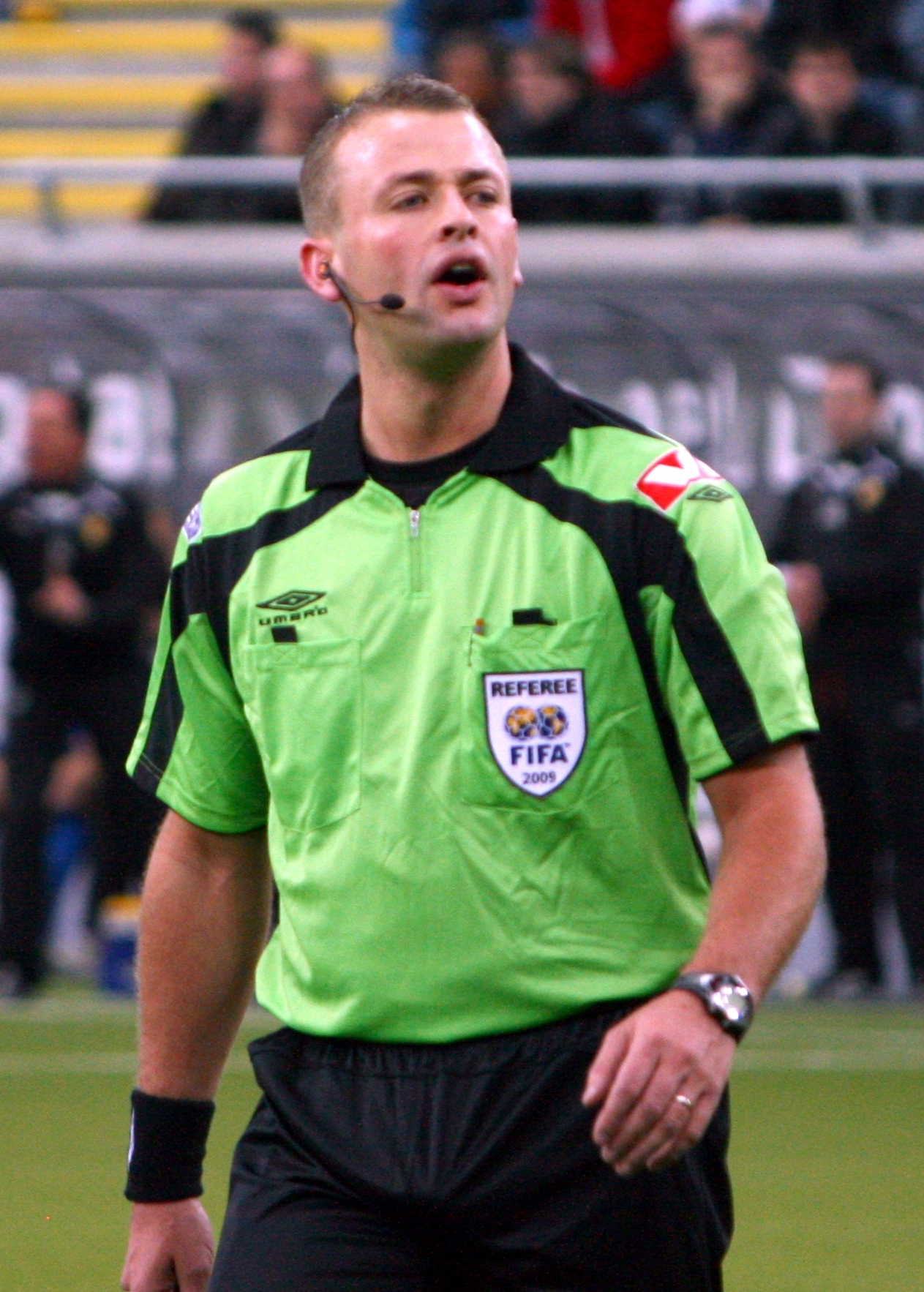
- Moen in 2008
- Full name: Svein Oddvar Moen
- Born: 22 January 1979 (age 47); Haugesund, Norway

Domestic
Years	League	Role
2003–2023	Eliteserien	Referee

International
Years	League	Role
2005–2022	FIFA listed	Referee

Svein Oddvar Moen (born 22 January 1979) is a Norwegian football referee. He took up refereeing in 1995, and made his debut in the Eliteserien in 2003. He represents SK Haugar.

== Career ==
He was selected to officiate the final of the 2011 FIFA U-17 World Cup on 10 July 2011.

Moen was in charge of the UEFA Champions League quarter final between Bayern Munich and Olympique de Marseille in 2012. He was also in charge of UEFA Champions League second round first leg between Bayern Munich and Arsenal on 19 February 2013 at the Emirates Stadium. He was also in charge of UEFA Champions League quarter final first leg between Real Madrid and Galatasaray on 3 April 2013 at the Santiago Bernabéu Stadium.

On 7 June 2013, he sent off Mario Balotelli in a World Cup qualifying game between Czech Republic and Italy.

He officiated in the Euro 2016 qualifier Germany v Scotland on 7 September 2014.

== Personal life ==
In September 2023, he was sentenced to four months in prison and fined 100,000 kroner for tax evasion.
