= Park Hall (Oswestry) =

Football stadium in Shropshire, England

Coordinates: 52°52′33″N 3°01′35″W

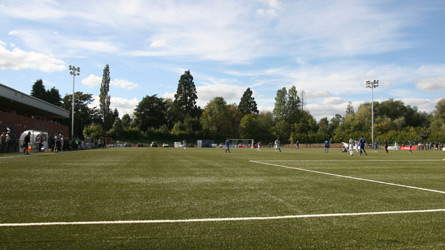
- Park Hall in 2007; UEFA Category 2 stadium
- Interactive map of Park Hall
- Location: Oswestry, Shropshire, England
- Capacity: 3,000 (all seater)
- Surface: Artificial pitch

Construction
- Built: 1993
- Renovated: 2005-2007, 2023
- Expanded: 2005-2007, 2023

Tenants
- Oswestry Town (1993–2003); The New Saints (2007–present); FC Oswestry Town (2013–2020); St Martins (2012–2022)

Park Hall Stadium is a football stadium to the north-east of Oswestry, Shropshire, England. It was opened by Shropshire County Council in 1993, originally as the home of Oswestry Town. In 2003, Oswestry Town merged with Total Network Solutions F.C. (TNS) to form current Cymru Premier team The New Saints. The newly merged club moved to Park Hall from Total Network Solutions' Recreation Ground.

Following a short period of abandonment, the site was purchased from the council by Mike Harris with a view to redevelopment and The New Saints moving back to the ground. The New Saints started to use Park Hall as their home ground again in 2007, and the ground was further improved so that it was able to host matches in the UEFA Champions League and UEFA Europa League. It has since been used to host youth international fixtures for both England and Wales while also hosting Non-League football for community teams in Oswestry.

Park Hall is also the name of the surrounding area, in Whittington civil parish, which has housing and some light industries.

== History ==
=== Oswestry Town and 2003 merger ===
The stadium was originally an army-owned sports ground. Park Hall was built as a stadium in 1993 by Shropshire County Council who owned the land and permitted Oswestry Town to use it as their home ground in the League of Wales after they had sold off their Victoria Road stadium. However, due to the club's financial problems, the ground fell into disrepair.

In 2003, Oswestry Town and Total Network Solutions F.C. (a Welsh club carrying the name of their sponsor, a local computer company) voted to merge. They entered into an agreement whereby the newly merged TNS would split matches between Park Hall and Total Network Solutions' Recreation Ground in Llansantffraid-ym-Mechain, with a view to moving to Park Hall. In the meantime, the majority of matches were played at the Recreation Ground with Park Hall being used only occasionally by TNS' women's, youth and reserve teams.

The move was initially blocked by UEFA because the two teams were in different countries. The two clubs appealed, and UEFA took into account Oswestry Town's historic membership of the Football Association of Wales. TNS director Richard Hann also argued the precedent of Derry City F.C. being based in Northern Ireland but playing in the Republic of Ireland's League of Ireland and being allowed to represent the Republic of Ireland in UEFA competitions. The decision was overturned, and UEFA stated that it would regard TNS and Park Hall as Welsh for UEFA purposes if they moved to Park Hall.

=== The New Saints ===
Following the merger, plans were drawn up to rebuild Park Hall in a project referred to as "Oswald Park". Subsequently in 2005, Park Hall was purchased from the council by Mike Harris. TNS then started to rebuild Park Hall with a view to moving there in 2008 because they were unable to improve the Recreation Ground as it was a council-owned recreation ground. Shortly afterwards, Total Network Solutions renamed themselves The New Saints as their sponsorship deal lapsed due to the sponsoring company being bought out by British Telecom. During renovation, Park Hall's pitch was replaced with artificial Ligaturf, as used at the home ground of Red Bull Salzburg. As a result of The New Saints moving to Park Hall and the decreasing number of the team's players who were from Llansantffraid, some supporters broke away from The New Saints to form Llansantffraid Village F.C.

In 2007, The New Saints moved into Park Hall permanently. In 2010, The New Saints applied for funding for a new stand, but it was refused by Welsh Grounds Improvement and the team risked losing their licence to compete in the Welsh Premier League. As a result, The New Saints applied to play their home matches at Deva Stadium in Chester and move away from Park Hall. Following the move from the Recreation Ground, between November 2012 and July 2015, The New Saints were unbeaten at Park Hall in all competitions.

Despite the renovations, the ground did not meet UEFA's standards for hosting European football which meant that The New Saints were forced to play their home matches in UEFA competitions away from Park Hall. In 2008, The New Saints hoped to be able to host their UEFA Cup match against FK Sūduva Marijampolė in their first European match at Park Hall, however they missed the UEFA deadline to increase capacity. In 2009, following construction of a new stand, Park Hall was able to be used by The New Saints in UEFA competition as it reached the 1,000 seated capacity requirement. The New Saints still sometimes move their home matches away from Park Hall for capacity and financial reasons.

=== International and European football ===
Park Hall has hosted international matches following its renovation. In 2015 it hosted Group 3 of the 2016 UEFA Women's Under-19 Championship qualification tournament, where Wales were designated as the host nation and chose Park Hall despite it being in England. Park Hall is used by England schools' football teams as their home ground for selected matches - in April 2016 against the Republic of Ireland, and in March 2024 against Wales.

Park Hall is also used to host European matches for other Welsh Premier League teams whose own grounds do not meet European requirements. Cefn Druids used the ground in 2018 to host a Europa League qualifier, and Bala Town played a Europa Conference League qualifying match at Park Hall on 8 July 2021.

In 2023, The New Saints began a renovation of the venue to increase the capacity from 1,000 to 3,000 seats and reach the UEFA Category 2 grade, which is required to continue to host first and second qualifying rounds of the UEFA club competitions. The New Saints continued to use the venue throughout the construction period.

== Community ==
During the 2000s redevelopment, The New Saints were awarded a £445,000 grant (out of a total cost of more than £3 million) from the Football Foundation with the intention of Park Hall housing a leisure development, with improved facilities including a ten-pin bowling alley. Park Hall is also used as the home ground of Oswestry Boys Club and Oswestry Town Lions of the Shropshire Alliance.
