= 2012–13 UEFA Champions League qualifying =

European football tournament

2012–13 UEFA Champions League qualifying was the preliminary phase of the 2012–13 UEFA Champions League, prior to the competition proper. Qualification consisted of the qualifying phase (first to third rounds) and the play-off round, and decided 10 of the 32 teams which played in the group stage.

All times are CEST (UTC+2).

== Round and draw dates ==
All draws were held at UEFA headquarters in Nyon, Switzerland.

Round	Draw date and time	First leg	Second leg
First qualifying round	25 June 2012, 12:00	3–4 July 2012	10–11 July 2012
Second qualifying round	25 June 2012, 12:00	17–18 July 2012	24–25 July 2012
Third qualifying round	20 July 2012, 12:00	31 July – 1 August 2012	7–8 August 2012
Play-off round	10 August 2012, 12:00	21–22 August 2012	28–29 August 2012

== Format ==
There were two routes which the teams were separated into during qualifying:

- Champions Route, which included all domestic champions which did not automatically qualify for the group stage.
- League Route (also called the Non-champions Path or the Best-placed Path), which included all domestic non-champions which did not automatically qualify for the group stage.

Each tie was played over two legs, with each team playing one leg at home. The team that scored more goals on aggregate over the two legs advanced to the next round. In the event that aggregate score finished level, the away goals rule would be applied, i.e., the team that scored more goals away from home over the two legs advanced. If away goals were also equal, then thirty minutes of extra time would be played, divided into two fifteen-minutes halves. The away goals rule would again be applied after extra time, i.e., if there were goals scored during extra time and the aggregate score was still level, the visiting team would advance by virtue of more away goals scored. If no goals were scored during extra time, the tie would be decided by penalty shootout.

In the draws for each round, teams were seeded based on their 2012 UEFA club coefficients, with the teams divided into seeded and unseeded pots. A seeded team was drawn against an unseeded team, with the order of legs in each tie decided randomly. Due to the limited time between matches, the draws for the second and third qualifying rounds took place before the results of the previous round were known. The seeding in these draws (or in any cases where the results of a tie in the previous round were not known at the time of draw) was carried out under the assumption that the higher-ranked teams of the previous round would advance to this round, which means if a lower-ranked team were to advance, it would simply take the seeding of its defeated opponent. Prior to the draws, UEFA may form "groups" in accordance with the principles set by the Club Competitions Committee, but they were purely for convenience of the draw and for ensuring that teams from the same association were not drawn against each other, and did not resemble any real groupings in the sense of the competition.

== Teams ==
Below were the 54 teams (40 in Champions Route, 14 in League Route) involved in the qualifying phase and play-off round, grouped by their starting rounds. The 10 winners of the play-off round (5 in Champions Route, 5 in League Route) qualified for the group stage to join the 22 automatic qualifiers. The losing teams from the third qualifying round and the play-off round dropped down to the Europa League play-off round and group stage respectively.

Key to colours
Qualified for the group stage
Eliminated in the play-off round; entered the Europa League group stage
Eliminated in the third qualifying round; entered the Europa League play-off round

=== Champions Route ===
Third qualifying round
Team	Coeff
(Belgium) Anderlecht	48.480
(Scotland) Celtic	32.728
(Romania) CFR Cluj	18.764

Second qualifying round
Team	Coeff
(Switzerland) Basel	53.360
(Belarus) BATE Borisov	29.641
(Austria) Red Bull Salzburg	29.225
(Croatia) Dinamo Zagreb	24.774
(Slovakia) Žilina	14.974
(Serbia) Partizan	14.350
(Sweden) Helsingborgs IF	12.680
(Moldova) Sheriff Tiraspol	9.849
(Hungary) Debrecen	7.950
(Slovenia) Maribor	6.424
(Latvia) Ventspils	5.674
(Czech Republic) Slovan Liberec	5.570
(Poland) Śląsk Wrocław	5.483
(Finland) HJK	5.326
(Cyprus) AEL Limassol	5.099
(Lithuania) Ekranas	4.875
(Georgia (country)) Zestaponi	4.733
(Republic of Ireland) Shamrock Rovers	4.475
(Israel) Ironi Kiryat Shmona	4.400
(Norway) Molde	3.935
(Bosnia and Herzegovina) Željezničar	3.683
(Iceland) KR	3.566
(Bulgaria) Ludogorets Razgrad	2.850
(Wales) The New Saints	2.799
(Montenegro) Budućnost Podgorica	2.375
(Estonia) Flora	2.283
(Azerbaijan) Neftçi	2.241
(Kazakhstan) Shakhter Karagandy	1.816
(Albania) Skënderbeu	1.783
(North Macedonia) Vardar	1.133
(Armenia) Ulisses	0.941

First qualifying round
Team	Coeff
(Northern Ireland) Linfield	2.766
(Luxembourg) F91 Dudelange	2.716
(Malta) Valletta	2.616
(San Marino) Tre Penne	0.933
(Andorra) Lusitanos	0.700
(Faroe Islands) B36	0.533

=== League Route ===
Play-off round
Team	Coeff
(Portugal) Braga	63.069
(Russia) Spartak Moscow	46.066
(Italy) Udinese	38.996
(France) Lille	38.835
(Spain) Málaga	16.837
(Germany) Borussia Mönchengladbach	15.037

Third qualifying round
Team	Coeff
(Ukraine) Dynamo Kyiv	62.026
(Greece) Panathinaikos	50.920
(Denmark) Copenhagen	46.505
(Turkey) Fenerbahçe	41.310
(Belgium) Club Brugge	35.480
(Romania) Vaslui	13.764
(Netherlands) Feyenoord	12.603
(Scotland) Motherwell	6.728

== First qualifying round ==
=== Seeding ===
Seeded	Unseeded
(Northern Ireland) Linfield (Luxembourg) F91 Dudelange (Malta) Valletta	(San Marino) Tre Penne (Andorra) Lusitanos (Faroe Islands) B36

=== Summary ===
Team 1	Agg.	Team 2	1st leg	2nd leg
F91 Dudelange (Luxembourg)	11–0	(San Marino) Tre Penne	7–0	4–0
Valletta (Malta)	9–0	(Andorra) Lusitanos	8–0	1–0
Linfield (Northern Ireland)	0–0 (4–3 p)	(Faroe Islands) B36	0–0	0–0 (a.e.t.)

=== Matches ===
3 July 2012
18:30

F91 Dudelange (Luxembourg)	7–0	(San Marino) Tre Penne
Mélisse 25'; Benzouien 29', 53'; Legros 47'; Joachim 51', 90+3'; D'Orsi 78' (o.g.)	Report

Stade Jos Nosbaum, Dudelange
Attendance: 1,070
Referee: Alan Mario Sant (Malta)
10 July 2012
20:30

Tre Penne (San Marino)	0–4	(Luxembourg) F91 Dudelange
	Report	Joachim 28', 34'; Benzouien 41'; Gomez 45+1'

Stadio Olimpico, Serravalle
Attendance: 450
Referee: Þorvaldur Árnason (Iceland)

F91 Dudelange won 11–0 on aggregate.

3 July 2012
19:30

Valletta (Malta)	8–0	(Andorra) Lusitanos
Caruana 4'; Mifsud 10', 18', 45', 70'; Jhonnattann 17', 23'; E. Agius 72'	Report

Hibernians Ground, Paola
Attendance: 1,136
Referee: Johnny Casanova (San Marino)
10 July 2012
19:30

Lusitanos (Andorra)	0–1	(Malta) Valletta
	Report	Jhonnattann 16'

Estadi Comunal, Andorra la Vella
Attendance: 500
Referee: Huw Jones (Wales)

Valletta won 9–0 on aggregate.

3 July 2012
20:45

Linfield (Northern Ireland)	0–0	(Faroe Islands) B36
	Report

Windsor Park, Belfast
Attendance: 1,341
Referee: Wim Smet (Belgium)
10 July 2012
19:00

B36 (Faroe Islands)	0–0 (a.e.t.)	(Northern Ireland) Linfield
	Report
Penalties
Matras (penalty missed); Danielsen (penalty scored); S. Olsen (penalty scored); R. Jakobsen (penalty scored); Cieślewicz (penalty missed)	3–4	(penalty scored) Ervin; (penalty scored) Browne; (penalty scored) Carvill; (penalty scored) McCaul

Gundadalur, Tórshavn
Attendance: 1,400
Referee: Suren Baliyan (Armenia)

0–0 on aggregate; Linfield won 4–3 on penalties.

== Second qualifying round ==
=== Seeding ===
Group 1		Group 2		Group 3	
Seeded	Unseeded	Seeded	Unseeded	Seeded	Unseeded
(Belarus) BATE Borisov (Slovakia) Žilina (Hungary) Debrecen (Slovenia) Maribor (Cyprus) AEL Limassol	(Israel) Ironi Kiryat Shmona (Bosnia and Herzegovina) Željezničar (Northern Ireland) Linfield (Albania) Skënderbeu (North Macedonia) Vardar	(Switzerland) Basel (Austria) Red Bull Salzburg (Sweden) Helsingborgs IF (Latvia) Ventspils (Finland) HJK (Lithuania) Ekranas	(Republic of Ireland) Shamrock Rovers (Norway) Molde (Iceland) KR (Wales) The New Saints (Luxembourg) F91 Dudelange (Estonia) Flora	(Croatia) Dinamo Zagreb (Serbia) Partizan (Moldova) Sheriff Tiraspol (Czech Republic) Slovan Liberec (Poland) Śląsk Wrocław (Georgia (country)) Zestaponi	(Bulgaria) Ludogorets Razgrad (Malta) Valletta (Montenegro) Budućnost Podgorica (Azerbaijan) Neftçi (Kazakhstan) Shakhter Karagandy (Armenia) Ulisses

Notes

1. ^{†} Winners of the previous round whose identity was not known at the time of the draw.

=== Summary ===
Team 1	Agg.	Team 2	1st leg	2nd leg
Skënderbeu (Albania)	1–3	(Hungary) Debrecen	1–0	0–3
Maribor (Slovenia)	6–2	(Bosnia and Herzegovina) Željezničar	4–1	2–1
Žilina (Slovakia)	1–2	(Israel) Ironi Kiryat Shmona	1–0	0–2
BATE Borisov (Belarus)	3–2	(North Macedonia) Vardar	3–2	0–0
AEL Limassol (Cyprus)	3–0	(Northern Ireland) Linfield	3–0	0–0
Shamrock Rovers (Republic of Ireland)	1–2	(Lithuania) Ekranas	0–0	1–2
Flora (Estonia)	0–5	(Switzerland) Basel	0–2	0–3
The New Saints (Wales)	0–3	(Sweden) Helsingborgs IF	0–0	0–3
HJK (Finland)	9–1	(Iceland) KR	7–0	2–1
Molde (Norway)	4–1	(Latvia) Ventspils	3–0	1–1
F91 Dudelange (Luxembourg)	4–4 (a)	(Austria) Red Bull Salzburg	1–0	3–4
Slovan Liberec (Czech Republic)	2–1	(Kazakhstan) Shakhter Karagandy	1–0	1–1 (a.e.t.)
Ludogorets Razgrad (Bulgaria)	3–4	(Croatia) Dinamo Zagreb	1–1	2–3
Neftçi (Azerbaijan)	5–2	(Georgia (country)) Zestaponi	3–0	2–2
Ulisses (Armenia)	0–2	(Moldova) Sheriff Tiraspol	0–1	0–1
Valletta (Malta)	2–7	(Serbia) Partizan	1–4	1–3
Budućnost Podgorica (Montenegro)	1–2	(Poland) Śląsk Wrocław	0–2	1–0

=== Matches ===
17 July 2012
20:30

Skënderbeu (Albania)	1–0	(Hungary) Debrecen
Plaku 65'	Report

Skënderbeu Stadium, Korçë
Attendance: 4,500
Referee: Nikolay Yordanov (Bulgaria)
24 July 2012
20:30

Debrecen (Hungary)	3–0	(Albania) Skënderbeu
Coulibaly 12', 87'; Varga 58'	Report

Városi Stadion, Nyíregyháza (Note: Debrecen played their home matches at Városi Stadion, Nyíregyháza instead of their regular stadium, Stadion Oláh Gábor Út, Debrecen.)
Attendance: 8,500
Referee: Kristo Tohver (Estonia)

Debrecen won 3–1 on aggregate.

18 July 2012
20:00

Maribor (Slovenia)	4–1	(Bosnia and Herzegovina) Željezničar
Berić 47', 76'; Mezga 67' (pen.); Tavares 90+2'	Report	Adilović 15'

Ljudski vrt, Maribor
Attendance: 10,251
Referee: Thorsten Kinhöfer (Germany)
24 July 2012
21:00

Željezničar (Bosnia and Herzegovina)	1–2	(Slovenia) Maribor
Kvesić 59'	Report	Ibraimi 20'; Tavares 86'

Asim Ferhatović Hase Stadium, Sarajevo (Note: Željezničar played their home match at Asim Ferhatović Hase Stadium, Sarajevo instead of their regular stadium, Stadion Grbavica, Sarajevo.)
Attendance: 10,000
Referee: Danny Makkelie (Netherlands)

Maribor won 6–2 on aggregate.

17 July 2012
19:30

Žilina (Slovakia)	1–0	(Israel) Ironi Kiryat Shmona
Piaček 82'	Report

Štadión pod Dubňom, Žilina
Attendance: 4,281
Referee: César Muñiz Fernández (Spain)
24 July 2012
18:30

Ironi Kiryat Shmona (Israel)	2–0	(Slovakia) Žilina
Leitner 71' (o.g.); Abuhatzira 78'	Report

Kiryat Eliezer Stadium, Haifa (Note: Ironi Kiryat Shmona played their Second and Third qualifying rounds home matches at Kiryat Eliezer Stadium, Haifa and Play-off round home match at Ramat Gan Stadium in Tel Aviv District, instead of their regular stadium, Municipal Stadium, Kiryat Shmona.)
Attendance: 3,050
Referee: Serhiy Boyko (Ukraine)

Ironi Kiryat Shmona won 2–1 on aggregate.

18 July 2012
18:00

BATE Borisov (Belarus)	3–2	(North Macedonia) Vardar
Mazalewski 41'; Radyyonaw 90+2', 90+4'	Report	Kostovski 54'; Stjepanović 62'

City Stadium, Borisov
Attendance: 5,180
Referee: Olivier Thual (France)
25 July 2012
20:00

Vardar (North Macedonia)	0–0	(Belarus) BATE Borisov
	Report

Philip II Arena, Skopje
Attendance: 28,500
Referee: Paolo Valeri (Italy)

BATE Borisov won 3–2 on aggregate.

18 July 2012
19:00

AEL Limassol (Cyprus)	3–0	(Northern Ireland) Linfield
Vouho 16'; Ouon 29'; Dickson 54'	Report

Tsirio Stadium, Limassol
Attendance: 5,904
Referee: Ken Henry Johnsen (Norway)
25 July 2012
20:45

Linfield (Northern Ireland)	0–0	(Cyprus) AEL Limassol
	Report

Windsor Park, Belfast
Attendance: 995
Referee: Martin Strömbergsson (Sweden)

AEL Limassol won 3–0 on aggregate.

17 July 2012
21:00

Shamrock Rovers (Republic of Ireland)	0–0	(Lithuania) Ekranas
	Report

Tallaght Stadium, Tallaght
Attendance: 4,800
Referee: Mattias Gestranius (Finland)
24 July 2012
19:00

Ekranas (Lithuania)	2–1	(Republic of Ireland) Shamrock Rovers
Anđelković 45+1'; Kymantas 63'	Report	McCabe 90+2' (pen.)

Aukštaitija Stadium, Panevėžys
Attendance: 3,100
Referee: Slavko Vinčić (Slovenia)

Ekranas won 2–1 on aggregate.

17 July 2012
17:45

Flora (Estonia)	0–2	(Switzerland) Basel
	Report	A. Frei 64', 87' (pen.)

A. Le Coq Arena, Tallinn
Attendance: 3,123
Referee: Mauro Bergonzi (Italy)
24 July 2012
20:00

Basel (Switzerland)	3–0	(Estonia) Flora
Zoua 9', 31'; Díaz 63'	Report

St. Jakob-Park, Basel
Attendance: 20,444
Referee: Artur Soares Dias (Portugal)

Basel won 5–0 on aggregate.

17 July 2012
20:15

The New Saints (Wales)	0–0	(Sweden) Helsingborgs IF
	Report

Park Hall, Oswestry
Attendance: 1,048
Referee: Sébastien Delferière (Belgium)
25 July 2012
19:15

Helsingborgs IF (Sweden)	3–0	(Wales) The New Saints
Atta 8'; Sørum 27'; Santos 89'	Report

Olympia, Helsingborg
Attendance: 5,613
Referee: Alain Bieri (Switzerland)

Helsingborgs IF won 3–0 on aggregate.

17 July 2012
18:00

HJK (Finland)	7–0	(Iceland) KR
Mäkelä 13', 78', 83'; Väyrynen 20' (pen.); Pohjanpalo 48', 67'; Schüller 57'	Report

Sonera Stadium, Helsinki
Attendance: 6,327
Referee: Harald Lechner (Austria)
24 July 2012
21:15

KR (Iceland)	1–2	(Finland) HJK
Atlason 74'	Report	Sadik 66'; Lindström 72'

KR-völlur, Reykjavík
Attendance: 561
Referee: Steven McLean (Scotland)

HJK won 9–1 on aggregate.

18 July 2012
20:45

Molde (Norway)	3–0	(Latvia) Ventspils
Angan 53', 83'; Forren 74' (pen.)	Report

Aker Stadion, Molde
Attendance: 7,428
Referee: Ivan Kružliak (Slovakia)
24 July 2012
17:30

Ventspils (Latvia)	1–1	(Norway) Molde
Kurakins 24'	Report	Eikrem 37'

Olimpiskais Stadions, Ventspils
Attendance: 1,500
Referee: Szymon Marciniak (Poland)

Molde won 4–1 on aggregate.

17 July 2012
18:30

F91 Dudelange (Luxembourg)	1–0	(Austria) Red Bull Salzburg
Joachim 75'	Report

Stade Jos Nosbaum, Dudelange
Attendance: 1,567
Referee: Anar Salmanov (Azerbaijan)
24 July 2012
18:00

Red Bull Salzburg (Austria)	4–3	(Luxembourg) F91 Dudelange
Jantscher 28'; Hinteregger 37'; Cristiano 81' (pen.); Zárate 82'	Report	Steimetz 26', 57'; Joachim 48'

Red Bull Arena, Salzburg
Attendance: 6,600
Referee: Pavle Radovanović (Montenegro)

4–4 on aggregate; F91 Dudelange won on away goals.

17 July 2012
19:00

Slovan Liberec (Czech Republic)	1–0	(Kazakhstan) Shakhter Karagandy
Hadaščok 23'	Report

Stadion u Nisy, Liberec
Attendance: 5,500
Referee: Aleksei Eskov (Russia)
24 July 2012
15:00

Shakhter Karagandy (Kazakhstan)	1–1 (a.e.t.)	(Czech Republic) Slovan Liberec
Kukeyev 40' (pen.)	Report	Blažek 120'

Shakhtyor Stadium, Karagandy
Attendance: 15,000
Referee: Kenn Hansen (Denmark)

Slovan Liberec won 2–1 on aggregate.

18 July 2012
20:00

Ludogorets Razgrad (Bulgaria)	1–1	(Croatia) Dinamo Zagreb
Marcelinho 67'	Report	Rukavina 90+2'

Ludogorets Arena, Razgrad
Attendance: 4,000
Referee: Radek Příhoda (Czech Republic)
25 July 2012
20:45

Dinamo Zagreb (Croatia)	3–2	(Bulgaria) Ludogorets Razgrad
Rukavina 33', 60'; Vida 90+8'	Report	Gargorov 12'; Marcelinho 36'

Stadion Maksimir, Zagreb
Attendance: 17,524
Referee: Felix Zwayer (Germany)

Dinamo Zagreb won 4–3 on aggregate.

17 July 2012
18:00

Neftçi (Azerbaijan)	3–0	(Georgia (country)) Zestaponi
Imamverdiyev 22'; Wobay 24'; Canales 63'	Report

Dalga Arena, Baku (Note: Neftçi played their home matches at Dalga Arena, Baku instead of their regular stadium, Ismat Gayibov Stadium, Baku.)
Attendance: 5,200
Referee: Marius Avram (Romania)
24 July 2012
19:00

Zestaponi (Georgia (country))	2–2	(Azerbaijan) Neftçi
Mujiri 16'; Dvali 19'	Report	Wobay 22'; Sadygov 52' (pen.)

David Abashidze Stadium, Zestaponi
Attendance: 4,500
Referee: Artyom Kuchin (Kazakhstan)

Neftçi won 5–2 on aggregate.

17 July 2012
17:00

Ulisses (Armenia)	0–1	(Moldova) Sheriff Tiraspol
	Report	Gheorghiev 60'

Vazgen Sargsyan Republican Stadium, Yerevan
Attendance: 3,000
Referee: Tamás Bognár (Hungary)
24 July 2012
19:00

Sheriff Tiraspol (Moldova)	1–0	(Armenia) Ulisses
Samardžić 66' (pen.)	Report

Sheriff Stadium, Tiraspol
Attendance: 6,755
Referee: Vlado Glođović (Serbia)

Sheriff Tiraspol won 2–0 on aggregate.

17 July 2012
20:45

Valletta (Malta)	1–4	(Serbia) Partizan
Mifsud 65'	Report	Tomić 6'; Ivanov 33'; S. Šćepović 42'; Ostojić 71'

Hibernians Ground, Paola
Attendance: 1,436
Referee: Liran Liany (Israel)
24 July 2012
20:45

Partizan (Serbia)	3–1	(Malta) Valletta
Tomić 10', 67'; Mitrović 73'	Report	Mifsud 60'

Stadion FK Partizan, Belgrade
Attendance: 8,754
Referee: Anastasios Sidiropoulos (Greece)

Partizan won 7–2 on aggregate.

18 July 2012
20:45

Budućnost Podgorica (Montenegro)	0–2	(Poland) Śląsk Wrocław
	Report	Elsner 19'; Mila 49' (pen.)

Stadion Pod Goricom, Podgorica
Attendance: 6,150
Referee: Clément Turpin (France)
25 July 2012
20:45

Śląsk Wrocław (Poland)	0–1	(Montenegro) Budućnost Podgorica
	Report	N. Vukčević 15'

Stadion Miejski, Wrocław
Attendance: 18,222
Referee: Michael Oliver (England)

Śląsk Wrocław won 2–1 on aggregate.

== Third qualifying round ==
=== Seeding ===
Champions Route				League Route	
Group 1		Group 2		League Route	
Seeded	Unseeded	Seeded	Unseeded	Seeded	Unseeded
(Belgium) Anderlecht (Belarus) BATE Borisov (Luxembourg) F91 Dudelange (Romania) CFR Cluj (Sweden) Helsingborgs IF	(Hungary) Debrecen (Slovenia) Maribor (Czech Republic) Slovan Liberec (Poland) Śląsk Wrocław (Lithuania) Ekranas	(Switzerland) Basel (Scotland) Celtic (Croatia) Dinamo Zagreb (Israel) Ironi Kiryat Shmona (Serbia) Partizan	(Moldova) Sheriff Tiraspol (Norway) Molde (Finland) HJK (Cyprus) AEL Limassol (Azerbaijan) Neftçi	(Ukraine) Dynamo Kyiv (Greece) Panathinaikos (Denmark) Copenhagen (Turkey) Fenerbahçe	(Belgium) Club Brugge (Romania) Vaslui (Netherlands) Feyenoord (Scotland) Motherwell

Notes

1. ^{†} Winners of the previous round whose identity was not known at the time of the draw (teams in italics defeated a team with a higher coefficient in the previous round, thus effectively taking the coefficient of their opponent in the draw for this round)

=== Summary ===
Team 1	Agg.	Team 2	1st leg	2nd leg
Champions Route
Maribor (Slovenia)	5–1	(Luxembourg) F91 Dudelange	4–1	1–0
BATE Borisov (Belarus)	3–1	(Hungary) Debrecen	1–1	2–0
CFR Cluj (Romania)	3–1	(Czech Republic) Slovan Liberec	1–0	2–1
Anderlecht (Belgium)	11–0	(Lithuania) Ekranas	5–0	6–0
Śląsk Wrocław (Poland)	1–6	(Sweden) Helsingborgs IF	0–3	1–3
Sheriff Tiraspol (Moldova)	0–5	(Croatia) Dinamo Zagreb	0–1	0–4
Celtic (Scotland)	4–1	(Finland) HJK	2–1	2–0
Molde (Norway)	1–2	(Switzerland) Basel	0–1	1–1
Ironi Kiryat Shmona (Israel)	6–2	(Azerbaijan) Neftçi	4–0	2–2
AEL Limassol (Cyprus)	2–0	(Serbia) Partizan	1–0	1–0
League Route
Fenerbahçe (Turkey)	5–2	(Romania) Vaslui	1–1	4–1
Motherwell (Scotland)	0–5	(Greece) Panathinaikos	0–2	0–3
Copenhagen (Denmark)	3–2	(Belgium) Club Brugge	0–0	3–2
Dynamo Kyiv (Ukraine)	3–1	(Netherlands) Feyenoord	2–1	1–0

=== Champions Route matches ===
1 August 2012
20:00

Maribor (Slovenia)	4–1	(Luxembourg) F91 Dudelange
Mezga 13', 47'; Tavares 38'; Berić 77'	Report	Joachim 90+2'

Ljudski vrt, Maribor
Attendance: 12,025
Referee: Aleksei Nikolaev (Russia)
8 August 2012
17:00

F91 Dudelange (Luxembourg)	0–1	(Slovenia) Maribor
	Report	Mertelj 79'

Stade Jos Nosbaum, Dudelange
Attendance: 1,236
Referee: Duarte Gomes (Portugal)

Maribor won 5–1 on aggregate.

1 August 2012
18:00

BATE Borisov (Belarus)	1–1	(Hungary) Debrecen
Sidibe 90+3' (o.g.)	Report	Sidibe 67'

City Stadium, Borisov
Attendance: 5,170
Referee: Sascha Kever (Switzerland)
7 August 2012
20:30

Debrecen (Hungary)	0–2	(Belarus) BATE Borisov
	Report	Mazalewski 25'; Valadzko 59'

Városi Stadion, Nyíregyháza
Attendance: 10,000
Referee: Liran Liany (Israel)

BATE Borisov won 3–1 on aggregate.

1 August 2012
20:45

CFR Cluj (Romania)	1–0	(Czech Republic) Slovan Liberec
Cadú 53' (pen.)	Report

Stadionul Dr. Constantin Rădulescu, Cluj-Napoca
Attendance: 6,914
Referee: Bülent Yıldırım (Turkey)
8 August 2012
19:00

Slovan Liberec (Czech Republic)	1–2	(Romania) CFR Cluj
Šural 58'	Report	Kapetanos 45+1'; Sougou 90+4'

Stadion u Nisy, Liberec
Attendance: 5,537
Referee: Serge Gumienny (Belgium)

CFR Cluj won 3–1 on aggregate.

1 August 2012
20:00

Anderlecht (Belgium)	5–0	(Lithuania) Ekranas
De Sutter 2'; Kanu 21'; Mbokani 41', 52'; Jovanović 87'	Report

Constant Vanden Stock Stadium, Brussels
Attendance: 12,203
Referee: Kristinn Jakobsson (Iceland)
8 August 2012
19:00

Ekranas (Lithuania)	0–6	(Belgium) Anderlecht
	Report	Kljestan 9'; Praet 31'; Yakovenko 45+3'; De Sutter 47'; Molins 62'; Fernando 87'

LFF Stadium, Vilnius (Note: Ekranas played their home match at LFF Stadium, Vilnius instead of their regular stadium, Aukštaitija Stadium, Panevėžys.)
Attendance: 600
Referee: Alon Yefet (Israel)

Anderlecht won 11–0 on aggregate.

1 August 2012
20:45

Śląsk Wrocław (Poland)	0–3	(Sweden) Helsingborgs IF
	Report	Finnbogason 36'; C. Andersson 72'; Nordmark 85'

Stadion Miejski, Wrocław
Attendance: 13,522
Referee: Ivan Bebek (Croatia)
8 August 2012
18:00

Helsingborgs IF (Sweden)	3–1	(Poland) Śląsk Wrocław
Sørum 43', 49', 68'	Report	Díaz 31'

Olympia, Helsingborg
Attendance: 4,836
Referee: Deniz Aytekin (Germany)

Helsingborgs IF won 6–1 on aggregate.

1 August 2012
19:00

Sheriff Tiraspol (Moldova)	0–1	(Croatia) Dinamo Zagreb
	Report	Bećiraj 14'

Sheriff Stadium, Tiraspol
Attendance: 8,315
Referee: Lee Probert (England)
8 August 2012
20:45

Dinamo Zagreb (Croatia)	4–0	(Moldova) Sheriff Tiraspol
Vida 16'; Bećiraj 34'; Čop 78'; Ibáñez 87'	Report

Stadion Maksimir, Zagreb
Attendance: 16,063
Referee: Leontios Trattou (Cyprus)

Dinamo Zagreb won 5–0 on aggregate.

1 August 2012
19:00

Molde (Norway)	0–1	(Switzerland) Basel
	Report	Zoua 79'

Aker Stadion, Molde
Attendance: 6,564
Referee: Fredy Fautrel (France)
8 August 2012
20:00

Basel (Switzerland)	1–1	(Norway) Molde
D. Degen 75'	Report	Berget 32'

St. Jakob-Park, Basel
Attendance: 18,567
Referee: Vladislav Bezborodov (Russia)

Basel won 2–1 on aggregate.

1 August 2012
20:45

Celtic (Scotland)	2–1	(Finland) HJK
Hooper 54'; Mulgrew 61'	Report	Schüller 48'

Celtic Park, Glasgow
Attendance: 52,849
Referee: Miroslav Zelinka (Czech Republic)
8 August 2012
19:00

HJK (Finland)	0–2	(Scotland) Celtic
	Report	Ledley 67'; Samaras 86'

Sonera Stadium, Helsinki
Attendance: 10,700
Referee: Robert Schörgenhofer (Austria)

Celtic won 4–1 on aggregate.

1 August 2012
18:30

Ironi Kiryat Shmona (Israel)	4–0	(Azerbaijan) Neftçi
Badash 42' (pen.); Abuhatzira 52'; Gerzicich 70', 76'	Report

Kiryat Eliezer Stadium, Haifa
Attendance: 2,520
Referee: Alan Kelly (Republic of Ireland)
8 August 2012
18:00

Neftçi (Azerbaijan)	2–2	(Israel) Ironi Kiryat Shmona
Wobay 31'; Imamverdiyev 76'	Report	Badash 50'; Lencse 90+1'

Dalga Arena, Baku
Attendance: 2,000
Referee: Martin Strömbergsson (Sweden)

Ironi Kiryat Shmona won 6–2 on aggregate.

1 August 2012
19:45

AEL Limassol (Cyprus)	1–0	(Serbia) Partizan
Vouho 13'	Report

Antonis Papadopoulos Stadium, Larnaca (Note: AEL Limassol played their Third qualifying round home match at Antonis Papadopoulos Stadium, Larnaca and Play-off round home match at GSP Stadium, Nicosia, instead of their regular stadium, Tsirio Stadium, Limassol.)
Attendance: 6,940
Referee: Stanislav Todorov (Bulgaria)
8 August 2012
20:45

Partizan (Serbia)	0–1	(Cyprus) AEL Limassol
	Report	Dossa Júnior 23'

Stadion FK Partizan, Belgrade
Attendance: 17,257
Referee: Carlos Clos Gómez (Spain)

AEL Limassol won 2–0 on aggregate.

=== League Route matches ===
1 August 2012
20:45

Fenerbahçe (Turkey)	1–1	(Romania) Vaslui
İrtegün 90'	Report	Antal 75'

Şükrü Saracoğlu Stadium, Istanbul
Attendance: 38,993
Referee: Antonio Mateu Lahoz (Spain)
8 August 2012
20:00

Vaslui (Romania)	1–4	(Turkey) Fenerbahçe
Niculae 14'	Report	Erkin 12'; Kuyt 71', 76'; Sow 90+2'

Stadionul Ceahlăul, Piatra Neamț (Note: Vaslui played their home match at Stadionul Ceahlăul, Piatra Neamț instead of their regular stadium, Stadionul Municipal, Vaslui.)
Attendance: 11,005
Referee: Sergei Karasev (Russia)

Fenerbahçe won 5–2 on aggregate.

31 July 2012
20:45

Motherwell (Scotland)	0–2	(Greece) Panathinaikos
	Report	Christodoulopoulos 14'; Mavrias 75'

Fir Park Stadium, Motherwell
Attendance: 9,035
Referee: Pol van Boekel (Netherlands)
8 August 2012
20:45

Panathinaikos (Greece)	3–0	(Scotland) Motherwell
Christodoulopoulos 51'; Mavrias 75'; Sissoko 83'	Report

Olympic Stadium, Athens
Attendance: 18,391
Referee: Stephan Studer (Switzerland)

Panathinaikos won 5–0 on aggregate.

1 August 2012
20:00

Copenhagen (Denmark)	0–0	(Belgium) Club Brugge
	Report

Parken Stadium, Copenhagen
Attendance: 14,023
Referee: Ovidiu Hațegan (Romania)
8 August 2012
20:30

Club Brugge (Belgium)	2–3	(Denmark) Copenhagen
Jordi 24'; Odjidja 66'	Report	Jørgensen 61'; Bolaños 78'; Santin 90+5'

Jan Breydel Stadium, Bruges
Attendance: 17,899
Referee: Michael Koukoulakis (Greece)

Copenhagen won 3–2 on aggregate.

31 July 2012
19:00

Dynamo Kyiv (Ukraine)	2–1	(Netherlands) Feyenoord
Immers 56' (o.g.); Ideye 69'	Report	Schaken 49'

Olympic Stadium, Kyiv
Attendance: 53,612
Referee: Andre Marriner (England)
7 August 2012
20:00

Feyenoord (Netherlands)	0–1	(Ukraine) Dynamo Kyiv
	Report	Ideye 90+6'

Stadion Feijenoord, Rotterdam
Attendance: 45,000
Referee: Antony Gautier (France)

Dynamo Kyiv won 3–1 on aggregate.

== Play-off round ==
=== Seeding ===
Champions Route		League Route	
Seeded	Unseeded	Seeded	Unseeded
(Switzerland) Basel (Belgium) Anderlecht (Scotland) Celtic (Belarus) BATE Borisov (Croatia) Dinamo Zagreb	(Romania) CFR Cluj (Sweden) Helsingborgs IF (Slovenia) Maribor (Cyprus) AEL Limassol (Israel) Ironi Kiryat Shmona	(Portugal) Braga (Ukraine) Dynamo Kyiv (Greece) Panathinaikos (Denmark) Copenhagen (Russia) Spartak Moscow	(Turkey) Fenerbahçe (Italy) Udinese (France) Lille (Spain) Málaga (Germany) Borussia Mönchengladbach

=== Summary ===
Team 1	Agg.	Team 2	1st leg	2nd leg
Champions Route
Basel (Switzerland)	1–3	(Romania) CFR Cluj	1–2	0–1
Helsingborgs IF (Sweden)	0–4	(Scotland) Celtic	0–2	0–2
BATE Borisov (Belarus)	3–1	(Israel) Ironi Kiryat Shmona	2–0	1–1
AEL Limassol (Cyprus)	2–3	(Belgium) Anderlecht	2–1	0–2
Dinamo Zagreb (Croatia)	3–1	(Slovenia) Maribor	2–1	1–0
League Route
Braga (Portugal)	2–2 (5–4 p)	(Italy) Udinese	1–1	1–1 (a.e.t.)
Spartak Moscow (Russia)	3–2	(Turkey) Fenerbahçe	2–1	1–1
Málaga (Spain)	2–0	(Greece) Panathinaikos	2–0	0–0
Borussia Mönchengladbach (Germany)	3–4	(Ukraine) Dynamo Kyiv	1–3	2–1
Copenhagen (Denmark)	1–2 (Note: Order of legs reversed after original draw.)	(France) Lille	1–0	0–2 (a.e.t.)

=== Champions Route matches ===
21 August 2012
20:45

Basel (Switzerland)	1–2	(Romania) CFR Cluj
Streller 44'	Report	Sougou 66', 71'

St. Jakob-Park, Basel
Attendance: 16,651
Referee: Jonas Eriksson (Sweden)
29 August 2012
20:45

CFR Cluj (Romania)	1–0	(Switzerland) Basel
Kapetanos 20'	Report

Stadionul Dr. Constantin Rădulescu, Cluj-Napoca
Attendance: 15,481
Referee: Gianluca Rocchi (Italy)

CFR Cluj won 3–1 on aggregate.

21 August 2012
20:45

Helsingborgs IF (Sweden)	0–2	(Scotland) Celtic
	Report	Commons 2'; Samaras 75'

Olympia, Helsingborg
Attendance: 12,200
Referee: Olegário Benquerença (Portugal)
29 August 2012
20:45

Celtic (Scotland)	2–0	(Sweden) Helsingborgs IF
Hooper 30'; Wanyama 88'	Report

Celtic Park, Glasgow
Attendance: 51,566
Referee: Carlos Velasco Carballo (Spain)

Celtic won 4–0 on aggregate.

22 August 2012
20:45

BATE Borisov (Belarus)	2–0	(Israel) Ironi Kiryat Shmona
Rodionov 29', 78'	Report

Dinamo Stadium, Minsk (Note: BATE Borisov played their home match at Dinamo Stadium, Minsk as their regular stadium (City Stadium in Borisov) did not meet UEFA criteria.)
Attendance: 16,352
Referee: Howard Webb (England)
28 August 2012
20:45

Ironi Kiryat Shmona (Israel)	1–1	(Belarus) BATE Borisov
Lencse 67'	Report	Pawlaw 90+4'

Ramat Gan Stadium, Ramat Gan
Attendance: 3,106
Referee: Viktor Kassai (Hungary)

BATE Borisov won 3–1 on aggregate.

22 August 2012
20:45

AEL Limassol (Cyprus)	2–1	(Belgium) Anderlecht
Dossa Júnior 34'; Rui Miguel 72'	Report	Mbokani 62'

GSP Stadium, Nicosia
Attendance: 10,456
Referee: Milorad Mažić (Serbia)
28 August 2012
20:45

Anderlecht (Belgium)	2–0	(Cyprus) AEL Limassol
Mbokani 81'; Yakovenko 89'	Report

Constant Vanden Stock Stadium, Brussels
Attendance: 18,174
Referee: Marcin Borski (Poland)

Anderlecht won 3–2 on aggregate.

22 August 2012
20:45

Dinamo Zagreb (Croatia)	2–1	(Slovenia) Maribor
Čop 10'; Badelj 74'	Report	Badelj 39' (o.g.)

Stadion Maksimir, Zagreb
Attendance: 20,315
Referee: Cüneyt Çakır (Turkey)
28 August 2012
20:45

Maribor (Slovenia)	0–1	(Croatia) Dinamo Zagreb
	Report	Tonel 12'

Ljudski vrt, Maribor
Attendance: 12,400
Referee: David Fernández Borbalán (Spain)

Dinamo Zagreb won 3–1 on aggregate.

=== League Route matches ===
22 August 2012
20:45

Braga (Portugal)	1–1	(Italy) Udinese
Ismaily 68'	Report	Basta 23'

Estádio Municipal, Braga
Attendance: 13,520
Referee: Wolfgang Stark (Germany)
28 August 2012
20:45

Udinese (Italy)	1–1 (a.e.t.)	(Portugal) Braga
Armero 25'	Report	Micael 72'
Penalties
Domizzi (penalty scored); Pinzi (penalty scored); Maicosuel (penalty missed); Armero (penalty scored); Di Natale (penalty scored)	4–5	(penalty scored) Lima; (penalty scored) Custódio; (penalty scored) Eder; (penalty scored) Paulo César; (penalty scored) Micael

Stadio Friuli, Udine
Attendance: 19,560
Referee: Björn Kuipers (Netherlands)

2–2 on aggregate; Braga won 5–4 on penalties.

21 August 2012
18:00

Spartak Moscow (Russia)	2–1	(Turkey) Fenerbahçe
Emenike 59'; D. Kombarov 69'	Report	Kuyt 65'

Luzhniki Stadium, Moscow
Attendance: 31,600
Referee: Martin Atkinson (England)
29 August 2012
20:45

Fenerbahçe (Turkey)	1–1	(Russia) Spartak Moscow
Sow 69'	Report	Ari 6'

Şükrü Saracoğlu Stadium, Istanbul
Attendance: 40,387
Referee: Felix Brych (Germany)

Spartak Moscow won 3–2 on aggregate.

22 August 2012
20:45

Málaga (Spain)	2–0	(Greece) Panathinaikos
Demichelis 17'; Eliseu 34'	Report

La Rosaleda Stadium, Málaga
Attendance: 24,605
Referee: Tony Chapron (France)
28 August 2012
20:45

Panathinaikos (Greece)	0–0	(Spain) Málaga
	Report

Olympic Stadium, Athens
Attendance: 27,719
Referee: Tom Harald Hagen (Norway)

Málaga won 2–0 on aggregate.

21 August 2012
20:45

Borussia Mönchengladbach (Germany)	1–3	(Ukraine) Dynamo Kyiv
Ring 13'	Report	Mykhalyk 28'; Yarmolenko 36'; De Jong 81' (o.g.)

Borussia-Park, Mönchengladbach
Attendance: 45,075
Referee: Pedro Proença (Portugal)
29 August 2012
20:45

Dynamo Kyiv (Ukraine)	1–2	(Germany) Borussia Mönchengladbach
Ideye 88'	Report	Khacheridi 70' (o.g.); Arango 78'

Olympic Stadium, Kyiv
Attendance: 66,872
Referee: Craig Thomson (Scotland)

Dynamo Kyiv won 4–3 on aggregate.

21 August 2012
20:45

Copenhagen (Denmark)	1–0	(France) Lille
Santin 38'	Report

Parken Stadium, Copenhagen
Attendance: 15,654
Referee: Marijo Strahonja (Croatia)
29 August 2012
20:45

Lille (France)	2–0 (a.e.t.)	(Denmark) Copenhagen
Digne 43'; De Melo 105'	Report

Grand Stade Lille Métropole, Villeneuve-d'Ascq
Attendance: 42,977
Referee: Pavel Královec (Czech Republic)

Lille won 2–1 on aggregate.

== Statistics ==
There were 226 goals in 88 matches in the qualifying phase and play-off round, for an average of 2.57 goals per match.

=== Top goalscorers ===
Rank	Player	Team	Goals	Minutes played
1	(Luxembourg) Aurélien Joachim	(Luxembourg) F91 Dudelange	7	509'
2	(Malta) Michael Mifsud	(Malta) Valletta	6	360'
3	(Democratic Republic of the Congo) Dieumerci Mbokani	(Belgium) Anderlecht	4	270'
3	(Norway) Thomas Sørum	(Sweden) Helsingborgs IF	4	389'
3	(Belarus) Vitali Rodionov	(Belarus) BATE Borisov	4	514'
6	(Brazil) Jhonnattann	(Malta) Valletta	3	161'
6	(Cameroon) Jacques Zoua	(Switzerland) Basel	3	231'
6	(Finland) Juho Mäkelä	(Finland) HJK	3	240'
6	(Croatia) Ante Rukavina	(Croatia) Dinamo Zagreb	3	314'
6	(Serbia) Nemanja Tomić	(Serbia) Partizan	3	328'
6	(Sierra Leone) Julius Wobay	(Azerbaijan) Neftçi	3	345'
6	(Belgium) Sofian Benzouien	(Luxembourg) F91 Dudelange	3	348'
6	(Netherlands) Dirk Kuyt	(Turkey) Fenerbahçe	3	356'
6	(Croatia) Dejan Mezga	(Slovenia) Maribor	3	359'
6	(Nigeria) Brown Ideye	(Ukraine) Dynamo Kyiv	3	360'
6	(Senegal) Modou Sougou	(Romania) CFR Cluj	3	360'
6	(Slovenia) Robert Berić	(Slovenia) Maribor	3	515'
6	(Brazil) Marcos Tavares	(Slovenia) Maribor	3	540'

=== Top assists ===
Rank	Player	Team	Assists	Minutes played
1	(Iceland) Alfreð Finnbogason	(Sweden) Helsingborgs IF	4	340'
2	(Bulgaria) Ivan Stoyanov	(Bulgaria) Ludogorets Razgrad	3	164'
2	(Ukraine) Denys Harmash	(Ukraine) Dynamo Kyiv	3	181'
2	(Brazil) Kanu	(Belgium) Anderlecht	3	242'
2	(Serbia) Stefan Babović	(Serbia) Partizan	3	292'
2	(Greece) Georgios Samaras	(Scotland) Celtic	3	335'
2	(Italy) William	(Malta) Valletta	3	360'
2	(Malta) Roderick Briffa	(Malta) Valletta	3	360'
2	(Scotland) Charlie Mulgrew	(Scotland) Celtic	3	360'
2	(Slovenia) Goran Cvijanović	(Slovenia) Maribor	3	517'
