= Wynnstay Group =

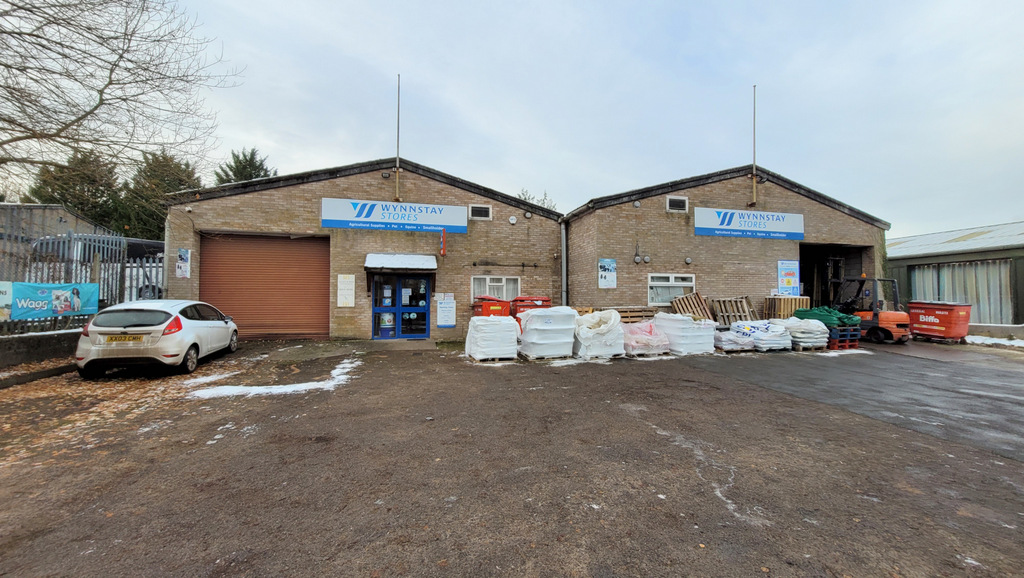
Branch in Ross-on-Wye, Herefordshire, UK

Wynnstay Group is a Welsh agricultural supplies company based in Llansantffraid, Powys, Wales.

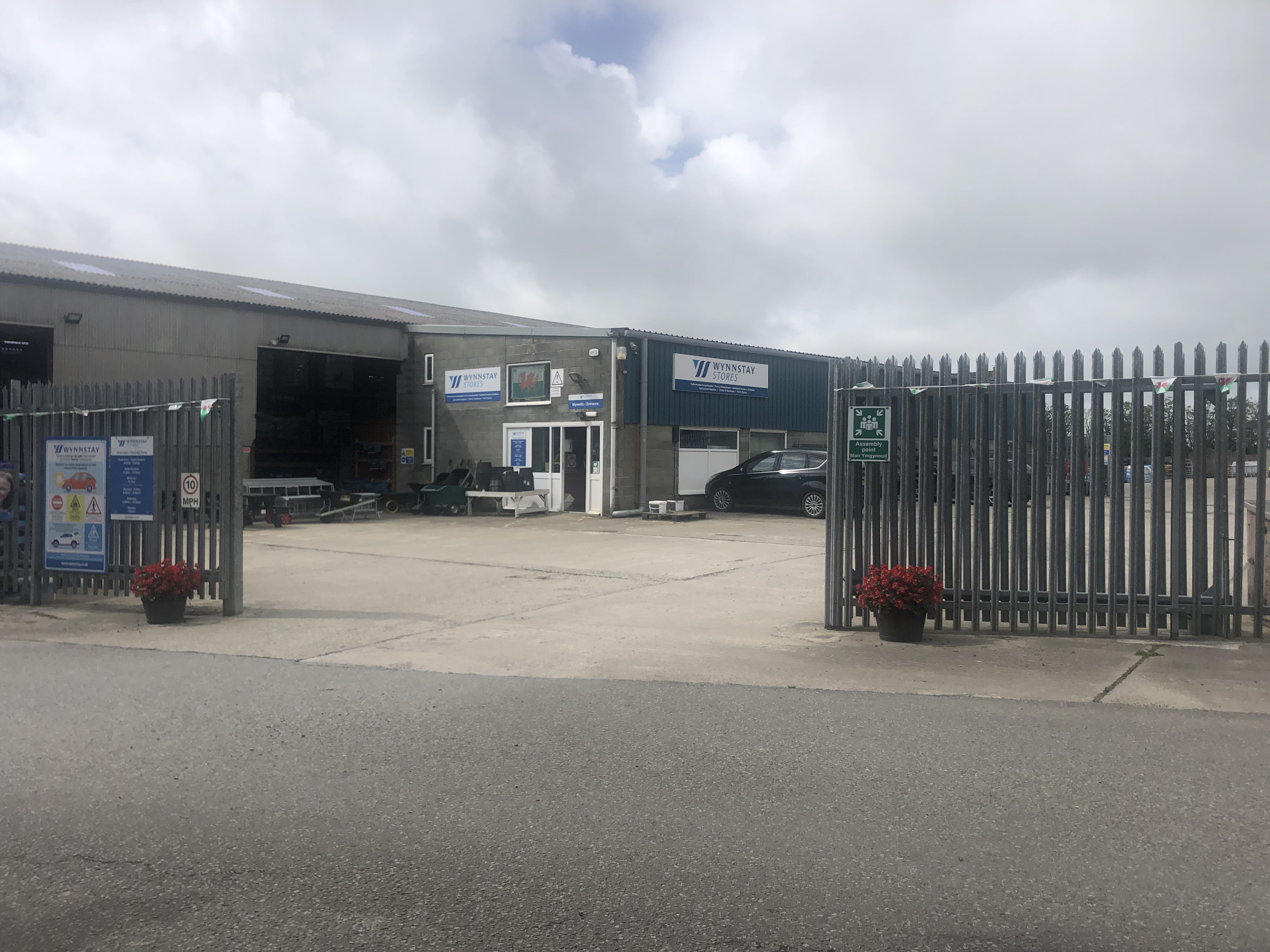
Branch in Llannor, Gwynedd

Founded in 1918 as an agricultural cooperative, the Llansantffraid and District Farmers' Association, it demutualised in 1992 and is listed on the London Stock Exchange. It had 786 employees in 2025.
