= 2012–13 UEFA Champions League =

European football tournament

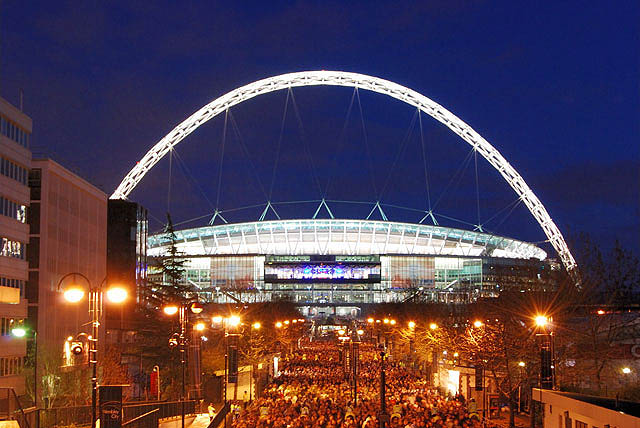
- Wembley Stadium in London hosted the final

Tournament details
- Dates: Qualifying: 3 July – 29 August 2012; Competition proper: 18 September 2012 – 25 May 2013
- Teams: Competition proper: 32; Total: 76 (from 52 associations)

Final positions
- Champions: (Germany) Bayern Munich (5th title)
- Runners-up: (Germany) Borussia Dortmund

Tournament statistics
- Matches played: 125
- Goals scored: 368 (2.94 per match)
- Attendance: 5,612,656 (44,901 per match)
- Top scorer(s): Cristiano Ronaldo (Real Madrid); 12 goals

The 2012–13 UEFA Champions League was the 58th season of Europe's premier club football tournament organised by UEFA, and the 21st season since it was renamed from the European Champion Clubs' Cup to the UEFA Champions League.

The final was played at Wembley Stadium in London, England, in recognition of the 150th anniversary of the formation of England's Football Association, the world's oldest football association. It came just two years after Wembley hosted the final in 2011, making it the seventh occasion Wembley Stadium (current and old) had hosted the Champions League final. Bayern Munich, who had been runners-up in the previous season, beat Bundesliga rivals Borussia Dortmund 2–1 to win their fifth title in the competition. It was the first all-German final and the fourth final to feature two teams from the same association, after the finals of 2000, 2003 and 2008.

Chelsea were the defending champions, but were eliminated in the group stage, becoming the first title holders to leave the competition at this stage. They went on to win the 2013 UEFA Europa League final, and became the first team to win the Europa League as the holders of the Champions League.

== Association team allocation ==
A total of 76 teams from 52 of the 53 UEFA member associations participate in the 2012–13 UEFA Champions League (the exception being Liechtenstein, which do not organise a domestic league). The association ranking based on the UEFA country coefficients is used to determine the number of participating teams for each association:

- Associations 1–3 each have four teams qualify
- Associations 4–6 each have three teams qualify
- Associations 7–15 each have two teams qualify
- Associations 16–53 (except Liechtenstein) each have one team qualify

Because the winners of the 2011–12 UEFA Champions League, Chelsea, failed to qualify for the 2012–13 UEFA Champions League through their domestic league (finishing sixth in the Premier League), and because of the restriction that no association can have more than four teams playing in the Champions League, Chelsea's entry in the 2012–13 UEFA Champions League as title holders came at the expense of Tottenham Hotspur, the fourth-placed team of the 2011–12 Premier League (who entered the Europa League instead).

=== Association ranking ===
For the 2012–13 UEFA Champions League, the associations are allocated places according to their 2011 UEFA country coefficients, which takes into account their performance in European competitions from 2006–07 to 2010–11.

| Rank | Association | Coeff | Teams |
|---|---|---|---|
| 1 | England | 85.785 | 4 |
| 2 | Spain | 82.329 | 4 |
| 3 | Germany | 69.436 | 4 |
| 4 | Italy | 60.552 | 3 |
| 5 | France | 53.678 | 3 |
| 6 | Portugal | 51.596 | 3 |
| 7 | Russia | 44.707 | 2 |
| 8 | Ukraine | 43.883 | 2 |
| 9 | Netherlands | 40.129 | 2 |
| 10 | Turkey | 35.050 | 2 |
| 11 | Greece | 34.166 | 2 |
| 12 | Denmark | 30.550 | 2 |
| 13 | Belgium | 27.000 | 2 |
| 14 | Romania | 25.824 | 2 |
| 15 | Scotland | 25.141 | 2 |
| 16 | Switzerland | 24.900 | 1 |
| 17 | Israel | 22.000 | 1 |
| 18 | Czech Republic | 20.850 | 1 |

| Rank | Association | Coeff | Teams |
|---|---|---|---|
| 19 | Austria | 20.700 | 1 |
| 20 | Cyprus | 18.124 | 1 |
| 21 | Bulgaria | 17.875 | 1 |
| 22 | Croatia | 16.124 | 1 |
| 23 | Belarus | 16.083 | 1 |
| 24 | Poland | 15.916 | 1 |
| 25 | Slovakia | 14.499 | 1 |
| 26 | Norway | 14.375 | 1 |
| 27 | Serbia | 14.250 | 1 |
| 28 | Sweden | 14.125 | 1 |
| 29 | Bosnia and Herzegovina | 9.124 | 1 |
| 30 | Finland | 8.966 | 1 |
| 31 | Republic of Ireland | 8.708 | 1 |
| 32 | Hungary | 8.500 | 1 |
| 33 | Moldova | 7.749 | 1 |
| 34 | Lithuania | 7.708 | 1 |
| 35 | Latvia | 7.415 | 1 |
| 36 | Georgia | 6.957 | 1 |

| Rank | Association | Coeff | Teams |
|---|---|---|---|
| 37 | Azerbaijan | 6.165 | 1 |
| 38 | Slovenia | 6.124 | 1 |
| 39 | Macedonia | 5.207 | 1 |
| 40 | Iceland | 4.957 | 1 |
| 41 | Kazakhstan | 4.374 | 1 |
| 42 | Liechtenstein | 4.000 | 0 |
| 43 | Montenegro | 3.875 | 1 |
| 44 | Albania | 3.874 | 1 |
| 45 | Estonia | 3.791 | 1 |
| 46 | Wales | 2.790 | 1 |
| 47 | Armenia | 2.583 | 1 |
| 48 | Malta | 2.416 | 1 |
| 49 | Northern Ireland | 2.249 | 1 |
| 50 | Faroe Islands | 1.416 | 1 |
| 51 | Luxembourg | 1.374 | 1 |
| 52 | Andorra | 1.000 | 1 |
| 53 | San Marino | 0.916 | 1 |

=== Distribution ===
Tottenham Hotspur were due to enter the Champions League play-off round for non-champions, but instead entered the Europa League because Chelsea won the Champions League the previous season. As this spot in the play-off round was vacated, the following change to the default allocation system was made to compensate:

- The third-placed team of association 6 (Portugal) and the runners-up of association 7 (Russia) were promoted from the third qualifying round to the play-off round

| | | Teams entering in this round | Teams advancing from previous round |
|---|---|---|---|
| First qualifying round (6 teams) | | 6 champions from associations 48–53 | |
| Second qualifying round (34 teams) | | 31 champions from associations 16–47 (except Liechtenstein) | 3 winners from the first qualifying round |
| Third qualifying round | Champions (20 teams) | 3 champions from associations 13–15 | 17 winners from the second qualifying round |
| Third qualifying round | Non-champions (8 teams) | 8 runners-up from associations 8–15 | |
| Play-off round | Champions (10 teams) | | 10 winners from the third qualifying round for champions |
| Play-off round | Non-champions (10 teams) | 1 runner-up from association 7; 3 third-placed teams from associations 4–6; 2 fourth-placed teams from associations 1–3 (minus the spot vacated by Tottenham Hotspur) | 4 winners from the third qualifying round for non-champions |
| Group stage (32 teams) | | Title holders; 12 champions from associations 1–12; 6 runners-up from associations 1–6; 3 third-placed teams from associations 1–3 | 5 winners from the play-off round for champions; 5 winners from the play-off round for non-champions |
| Knockout phase (16 teams) | | | 8 group winners from the group stage; 8 group runners-up from the group stage |

=== Teams ===
League positions of the previous season qualified via league position shown in parentheses. Chelsea qualified as title holders. (TH: Champions League title holders; EL: Europa League title holders).

Group stage
| (England) Chelsea (TH) | (Spain) Valencia (3rd) | (France) Montpellier (1st) | (Ukraine) Shakhtar Donetsk (1st) |
| (England) Manchester City (1st) | (Germany) Borussia Dortmund (1st) | (France) Paris Saint-Germain (2nd) | (Netherlands) Ajax (1st) |
| (England) Manchester United (2nd) | (Germany) Bayern Munich (2nd) | (Portugal) Porto (1st) | (Turkey) Galatasaray (1st) |
| (England) Arsenal (3rd) | (Germany) Schalke 04 (3rd) | (Portugal) Benfica (2nd) | (Greece) Olympiacos (1st) |
| (Spain) Real Madrid (1st) | (Italy) Juventus (1st) | (Russia) Zenit Saint Petersburg (1st) | (Denmark) Nordsjælland (1st) |
| (Spain) Barcelona (2nd) | (Italy) Milan (2nd) | | |
Play-off round
| Champions | Non-champions | | |
| | (Spain) Málaga (4th) | (Italy) Udinese (3rd) | (Portugal) Braga (3rd) |
| | (Germany) Borussia Mönchengladbach (4th) | (France) Lille (3rd) | (Russia) Spartak Moscow (2nd) |
Third qualifying round
| Champions | Non-champions | | |
| (Belgium) Anderlecht (1st) | (Ukraine) Dynamo Kyiv (2nd) | (Greece) Panathinaikos (2nd) | (Romania) Vaslui (2nd) |
| (Romania) CFR Cluj (1st) | (Netherlands) Feyenoord (2nd) | (Denmark) Copenhagen (2nd) | (Scotland) Motherwell (3rd) |
| (Scotland) Celtic (1st) | (Turkey) Fenerbahçe (2nd) | (Belgium) Club Brugge (2nd) | |
Second qualifying round
| (Switzerland) Basel (1st) | (Poland) Śląsk Wrocław (1st) | (Hungary) Debrecen (1st) | (Iceland) KR (1st) |
| (Israel) Ironi Kiryat Shmona (1st) | (Slovakia) Žilina (1st) | (Moldova) Sheriff Tiraspol (1st) | (Kazakhstan) Shakhter Karagandy (1st) |
| (Czech Republic) Slovan Liberec (1st) | (Norway) Molde (1st) | (Lithuania) Ekranas (1st) | (Montenegro) Budućnost Podgorica (1st) |
| (Austria) Red Bull Salzburg (1st) | (Serbia) Partizan (1st) | (Latvia) Ventspils (1st) | (Albania) Skënderbeu (1st) |
| (Cyprus) AEL Limassol (1st) | (Sweden) Helsingborgs IF (1st) | (Georgia (country)) Zestaponi (1st) | (Estonia) Flora (1st) |
| (Bulgaria) Ludogorets Razgrad (1st) | (Bosnia and Herzegovina) Željezničar (1st) | (Azerbaijan) Neftçi (1st) | (Wales) The New Saints (1st) |
| (Croatia) Dinamo Zagreb (1st) | (Finland) HJK (1st) | (Slovenia) Maribor (1st) | (Armenia) Ulisses (1st) |
| (Belarus) BATE Borisov (1st) | (Republic of Ireland) Shamrock Rovers (1st) | (North Macedonia) Vardar (1st) | |
First qualifying round
| (Malta) Valletta (1st) | (Faroe Islands) B36 (1st) | (Andorra) Lusitanos (1st) | (San Marino) Tre Penne (1st) |
| (Northern Ireland) Linfield (1st) | (Luxembourg) F91 Dudelange (1st) | | |

Notes

1. Scotland (SCO): As a result of second-placed Rangers' administration and eventual liquidation, Motherwell, the third-placed team of the 2011–12 Scottish Premier League, took Scotland's Champions League place in the non-champions path

== Round and draw dates ==
All draws were held at UEFA headquarters in Nyon, Switzerland unless stated otherwise.

| Phase | Round | Draw date | First leg | Second leg |
|---|---|---|---|---|
| Qualifying | First qualifying round | 25 June 2012 | 3–4 July 2012 | 10–11 July 2012 |
| Qualifying | Second qualifying round | 25 June 2012 | 17–18 July 2012 | 24–25 July 2012 |
| Qualifying | Third qualifying round | 20 July 2012 | 31 July – 1 August 2012 | 7–8 August 2012 |
| Play-off | Play-off round | 10 August 2012 | 21–22 August 2012 | 28–29 August 2012 |
| Group stage | Matchday 1 | 30 August 2012 (Monaco) | 18–19 September 2012 | |
| Group stage | Matchday 2 | 30 August 2012 (Monaco) | 2–3 October 2012 | |
| Group stage | Matchday 3 | 30 August 2012 (Monaco) | 23–24 October 2012 | |
| Group stage | Matchday 4 | 30 August 2012 (Monaco) | 6–7 November 2012 | |
| Group stage | Matchday 5 | 30 August 2012 (Monaco) | 20–21 November 2012 | |
| Group stage | Matchday 6 | 30 August 2012 (Monaco) | 4–5 December 2012 | |
| Knockout phase | Round of 16 | 20 December 2012 | 12–13 & 19–20 February 2013 | 5–6 & 12–13 March 2013 |
| Knockout phase | Quarter-finals | 15 March 2013 | 2–3 April 2013 | 9–10 April 2013 |
| Knockout phase | Semi-finals | 12 April 2013 | 23–24 April 2013 | 30 April – 1 May 2013 |
| Knockout phase | Final | 12 April 2013 | 25 May 2013 at Wembley Stadium, London | |

== Qualifying rounds ==
In the qualifying rounds and the play-off round, teams were divided into seeded and unseeded teams based on their 2012 UEFA club coefficients, and then drawn into two-legged home-and-away ties. Teams from the same association could not be drawn against each other.

=== First qualifying round ===
The draws for the first and second qualifying rounds were held on 25 June 2012. The first legs were played on 3 July and the second legs were played on 10 July 2012.

| Team 1 | Agg. | Team 2 | 1st leg | 2nd leg |
|---|---|---|---|---|
| F91 Dudelange (Luxembourg) | 11–0 | (San Marino) Tre Penne | 7–0 | 4–0 |
| Valletta (Malta) | 9–0 | (Andorra) Lusitanos | 8–0 | 1–0 |
| Linfield (Northern Ireland) | 0–0 (4–3 p) | (Faroe Islands) B36 | 0–0 | 0–0 (a.e.t.) |

=== Second qualifying round ===
The first legs were played on 17 and 18 July and the second legs were played on 24 and 25 July 2012.

| Team 1 | Agg. | Team 2 | 1st leg | 2nd leg |
|---|---|---|---|---|
| Skënderbeu (Albania) | 1–3 | (Hungary) Debrecen | 1–0 | 0–3 |
| Maribor (Slovenia) | 6–2 | (Bosnia and Herzegovina) Željezničar | 4–1 | 2–1 |
| Žilina (Slovakia) | 1–2 | (Israel) Ironi Kiryat Shmona | 1–0 | 0–2 |
| BATE Borisov (Belarus) | 3–2 | (North Macedonia) Vardar | 3–2 | 0–0 |
| AEL Limassol (Cyprus) | 3–0 | (Northern Ireland) Linfield | 3–0 | 0–0 |
| Shamrock Rovers (Republic of Ireland) | 1–2 | (Lithuania) Ekranas | 0–0 | 1–2 |
| Flora (Estonia) | 0–5 | (Switzerland) Basel | 0–2 | 0–3 |
| The New Saints (Wales) | 0–3 | (Sweden) Helsingborgs IF | 0–0 | 0–3 |
| HJK (Finland) | 9–1 | (Iceland) KR | 7–0 | 2–1 |
| Molde (Norway) | 4–1 | (Latvia) Ventspils | 3–0 | 1–1 |
| F91 Dudelange (Luxembourg) | 4–4 (a) | (Austria) Red Bull Salzburg | 1–0 | 3–4 |
| Slovan Liberec (Czech Republic) | 2–1 | (Kazakhstan) Shakhter Karagandy | 1–0 | 1–1 (a.e.t.) |
| Ludogorets Razgrad (Bulgaria) | 3–4 | (Croatia) Dinamo Zagreb | 1–1 | 2–3 |
| Neftçi (Azerbaijan) | 5–2 | (Georgia (country)) Zestaponi | 3–0 | 2–2 |
| Ulisses (Armenia) | 0–2 | (Moldova) Sheriff Tiraspol | 0–1 | 0–1 |
| Valletta (Malta) | 2–7 | (Serbia) Partizan | 1–4 | 1–3 |
| Budućnost Podgorica (Montenegro) | 1–2 | (Poland) Śląsk Wrocław | 0–2 | 1–0 |

=== Third qualifying round ===
The third qualifying round was split into two separate sections: one for champions (Champions Route) and one for non-champions (League Route). The losing teams in both sections entered the Europa League play-off round.

The draw for the third qualifying round was held on 20 July 2012. The first legs were played on 31 July and 1 August and the second legs were played on 7 and 8 August 2012.

| Team 1 | Agg. | Team 2 | 1st leg | 2nd leg |
|---|---|---|---|---|
Champions Route
| Maribor (Slovenia) | 5–1 | (Luxembourg) F91 Dudelange | 4–1 | 1–0 |
| BATE Borisov (Belarus) | 3–1 | (Hungary) Debrecen | 1–1 | 2–0 |
| CFR Cluj (Romania) | 3–1 | (Czech Republic) Slovan Liberec | 1–0 | 2–1 |
| Anderlecht (Belgium) | 11–0 | (Lithuania) Ekranas | 5–0 | 6–0 |
| Śląsk Wrocław (Poland) | 1–6 | (Sweden) Helsingborgs IF | 0–3 | 1–3 |
| Sheriff Tiraspol (Moldova) | 0–5 | (Croatia) Dinamo Zagreb | 0–1 | 0–4 |
| Celtic (Scotland) | 4–1 | (Finland) HJK | 2–1 | 2–0 |
| Molde (Norway) | 1–2 | (Switzerland) Basel | 0–1 | 1–1 |
| Ironi Kiryat Shmona (Israel) | 6–2 | (Azerbaijan) Neftçi | 4–0 | 2–2 |
| AEL Limassol (Cyprus) | 2–0 | (Serbia) Partizan | 1–0 | 1–0 |
League Route
| Fenerbahçe (Turkey) | 5–2 | (Romania) Vaslui | 1–1 | 4–1 |
| Motherwell (Scotland) | 0–5 | (Greece) Panathinaikos | 0–2 | 0–3 |
| Copenhagen (Denmark) | 3–2 | (Belgium) Club Brugge | 0–0 | 3–2 |
| Dynamo Kyiv (Ukraine) | 3–1 | (Netherlands) Feyenoord | 2–1 | 1–0 |

== Play-off round ==
The play-off round was split into two separate sections: one for champions (Champions Route) and one for non-champions (League Route). The losing teams in both sections entered the Europa League group stage.

The draw for the play-off round was held on 10 August 2012. The first legs were played on 21 and 22 August, and the second legs were played on 28 and 29 August 2012.

| Team 1 | Agg. | Team 2 | 1st leg | 2nd leg |
|---|---|---|---|---|
Champions Route
| Basel (Switzerland) | 1–3 | (Romania) CFR Cluj | 1–2 | 0–1 |
| Helsingborgs IF (Sweden) | 0–4 | (Scotland) Celtic | 0–2 | 0–2 |
| BATE Borisov (Belarus) | 3–1 | (Israel) Ironi Kiryat Shmona | 2–0 | 1–1 |
| AEL Limassol (Cyprus) | 2–3 | (Belgium) Anderlecht | 2–1 | 0–2 |
| Dinamo Zagreb (Croatia) | 3–1 | (Slovenia) Maribor | 2–1 | 1–0 |
League Route
| Braga (Portugal) | 2–2 (5–4 p) | (Italy) Udinese | 1–1 | 1–1 (a.e.t.) |
| Spartak Moscow (Russia) | 3–2 | (Turkey) Fenerbahçe | 2–1 | 1–1 |
| Málaga (Spain) | 2–0 | (Greece) Panathinaikos | 2–0 | 0–0 |
| Borussia Mönchengladbach (Germany) | 3–4 | (Ukraine) Dynamo Kyiv | 1–3 | 2–1 |
| Copenhagen (Denmark) | 1–2 (Note: Order of legs reversed after original draw.) | (France) Lille | 1–0 | 0–2 (a.e.t.) |

== Group stage ==
Location of teams of the 2012–13 UEFA Champions League group stage.
Brown: Group A; Red: Group B; Orange: Group C; Yellow: Group D;
Green: Group E; Blue: Group F; Purple: Group G; Pink: Group H

The draw for the group stage was held in Monaco on 30 August 2012. The 32 teams were allocated into four pots based on their 2012 UEFA club coefficients, with the title holders, Chelsea, being placed in Pot 1 automatically. They were drawn into eight groups of four, with the restriction that teams from the same association could not be drawn against each other.

In each group, teams played against each other home-and-away in a round-robin format. The matchdays were 18–19 September, 2–3 October, 23–24 October, 6–7 November, 20–21 November and 4–5 December 2012. The group winners and runners-up advanced to the round of 16, while the third-placed teams entered the Europa League round of 32.

A total of 17 national associations were represented in the group stage. Málaga, Montpellier and Nordsjælland made their debut appearances in the group stage.

=== Group A ===
| Pos | Team | Pld | W | D | L | GF | GA | GD | Pts | Qualification | PAR | POR | DKV | DZG |
|---|---|---|---|---|---|---|---|---|---|---|---|---|---|---|
| 1 | (France) Paris Saint-Germain | 6 | 5 | 0 | 1 | 14 | 3 | +11 | 15 | Advance to knockout phase | — | 2–1 | 4–1 | 4–0 |
| 2 | (Portugal) Porto | 6 | 4 | 1 | 1 | 10 | 4 | +6 | 13 | Advance to knockout phase | 1–0 | — | 3–2 | 3–0 |
| 3 | (Ukraine) Dynamo Kyiv | 6 | 1 | 2 | 3 | 6 | 10 | −4 | 5 | Transfer to Europa League | 0–2 | 0–0 | — | 2–0 |
| 4 | (Croatia) Dinamo Zagreb | 6 | 0 | 1 | 5 | 1 | 14 | −13 | 1 | | 0–2 | 0–2 | 1–1 | — |

Source: Soccerway

=== Group B ===
| Pos | Team | Pld | W | D | L | GF | GA | GD | Pts | Qualification | SCH | ARS | OLY | MPL |
|---|---|---|---|---|---|---|---|---|---|---|---|---|---|---|
| 1 | (Germany) Schalke 04 | 6 | 3 | 3 | 0 | 10 | 6 | +4 | 12 | Advance to knockout phase | — | 2–2 | 1–0 | 2–2 |
| 2 | (England) Arsenal | 6 | 3 | 1 | 2 | 10 | 8 | +2 | 10 | Advance to knockout phase | 0–2 | — | 3–1 | 2–0 |
| 3 | (Greece) Olympiacos | 6 | 3 | 0 | 3 | 9 | 9 | 0 | 9 | Transfer to Europa League | 1–2 | 2–1 | — | 3–1 |
| 4 | (France) Montpellier | 6 | 0 | 2 | 4 | 6 | 12 | −6 | 2 | | 1–1 | 1–2 | 1–2 | — |

Source: Soccerway

=== Group C ===
| Pos | Team | Pld | W | D | L | GF | GA | GD | Pts | Qualification | MLG | MIL | ZEN | AND |
|---|---|---|---|---|---|---|---|---|---|---|---|---|---|---|
| 1 | (Spain) Málaga | 6 | 3 | 3 | 0 | 12 | 5 | +7 | 12 | Advance to knockout phase | — | 1–0 | 3–0 | 2–2 |
| 2 | (Italy) Milan | 6 | 2 | 2 | 2 | 7 | 6 | +1 | 8 | Advance to knockout phase | 1–1 | — | 0–1 | 0–0 |
| 3 | (Russia) Zenit Saint Petersburg | 6 | 2 | 1 | 3 | 6 | 9 | −3 | 7 | Transfer to Europa League | 2–2 | 2–3 | — | 1–0 |
| 4 | (Belgium) Anderlecht | 6 | 1 | 2 | 3 | 4 | 9 | −5 | 5 | | 0–3 | 1–3 | 1–0 | — |

Source: Soccerway

=== Group D ===
| Pos | Team | Pld | W | D | L | GF | GA | GD | Pts | Qualification | DOR | RMA | AJX | MCI |
|---|---|---|---|---|---|---|---|---|---|---|---|---|---|---|
| 1 | (Germany) Borussia Dortmund | 6 | 4 | 2 | 0 | 11 | 5 | +6 | 14 | Advance to knockout phase | — | 2–1 | 1–0 | 1–0 |
| 2 | (Spain) Real Madrid | 6 | 3 | 2 | 1 | 15 | 9 | +6 | 11 | Advance to knockout phase | 2–2 | — | 4–1 | 3–2 |
| 3 | (Netherlands) Ajax | 6 | 1 | 1 | 4 | 8 | 16 | −8 | 4 | Transfer to Europa League | 1–4 | 1–4 | — | 3–1 |
| 4 | (England) Manchester City | 6 | 0 | 3 | 3 | 7 | 11 | −4 | 3 | | 1–1 | 1–1 | 2–2 | — |

Source: Soccerway

=== Group E ===
| Pos | Team | Pld | W | D | L | GF | GA | GD | Pts | Qualification | JUV | SHK | CHE | NOR |
|---|---|---|---|---|---|---|---|---|---|---|---|---|---|---|
| 1 | (Italy) Juventus | 6 | 3 | 3 | 0 | 12 | 4 | +8 | 12 | Advance to knockout phase | — | 1–1 | 3–0 | 4–0 |
| 2 | (Ukraine) Shakhtar Donetsk | 6 | 3 | 1 | 2 | 12 | 8 | +4 | 10 (Note: Tied on head-to-head points (3) and head-to-head goal difference (0). Head-to-head away goals: Shakhtar Donetsk 2, Chelsea 1.) | Advance to knockout phase | 0–1 | — | 2–1 | 2–0 |
| 3 | (England) Chelsea | 6 | 3 | 1 | 2 | 16 | 10 | +6 | 10 | Transfer to Europa League | 2–2 | 3–2 | — | 6–1 |
| 4 | (Denmark) Nordsjælland | 6 | 0 | 1 | 5 | 4 | 22 | −18 | 1 | | 1–1 | 2–5 | 0–4 | — |

Source: Soccerway

=== Group F ===
| Pos | Team | Pld | W | D | L | GF | GA | GD | Pts | Qualification | BAY | VAL | BATE | LIL |
|---|---|---|---|---|---|---|---|---|---|---|---|---|---|---|
| 1 | (Germany) Bayern Munich | 6 | 4 | 1 | 1 | 15 | 7 | +8 | 13 (Note: Head-to-head points: Bayern Munich 4, Valencia 1.) | Advance to knockout phase | — | 2–1 | 4–1 | 6–1 |
| 2 | (Spain) Valencia | 6 | 4 | 1 | 1 | 12 | 5 | +7 | 13 | Advance to knockout phase | 1–1 | — | 4–2 | 2–0 |
| 3 | (Belarus) BATE Borisov | 6 | 2 | 0 | 4 | 9 | 15 | −6 | 6 | Transfer to Europa League | 3–1 | 0–3 | — | 0–2 |
| 4 | (France) Lille | 6 | 1 | 0 | 5 | 4 | 13 | −9 | 3 | | 0–1 | 0–1 | 1–3 | — |

Source: Soccerway

=== Group G ===
| Pos | Team | Pld | W | D | L | GF | GA | GD | Pts | Qualification | BAR | CEL | BEN | SPM |
|---|---|---|---|---|---|---|---|---|---|---|---|---|---|---|
| 1 | (Spain) Barcelona | 6 | 4 | 1 | 1 | 11 | 5 | +6 | 13 | Advance to knockout phase | — | 2–1 | 0–0 | 3–2 |
| 2 | (Scotland) Celtic | 6 | 3 | 1 | 2 | 9 | 8 | +1 | 10 | Advance to knockout phase | 2–1 | — | 0–0 | 2–1 |
| 3 | (Portugal) Benfica | 6 | 2 | 2 | 2 | 5 | 5 | 0 | 8 | Transfer to Europa League | 0–2 | 2–1 | — | 2–0 |
| 4 | (Russia) Spartak Moscow | 6 | 1 | 0 | 5 | 7 | 14 | −7 | 3 | | 0–3 | 2–3 | 2–1 | — |

Source: Soccerway

=== Group H ===
| Pos | Team | Pld | W | D | L | GF | GA | GD | Pts | Qualification | MUN | GAL | CLJ | BRA |
|---|---|---|---|---|---|---|---|---|---|---|---|---|---|---|
| 1 | (England) Manchester United | 6 | 4 | 0 | 2 | 9 | 6 | +3 | 12 | Advance to knockout phase | — | 1–0 | 0–1 | 3–2 |
| 2 | (Turkey) Galatasaray | 6 | 3 | 1 | 2 | 7 | 6 | +1 | 10 (Note: Head-to-head points: Galatasaray 4, CFR Cluj 1.) | Advance to knockout phase | 1–0 | — | 1–1 | 0–2 |
| 3 | (Romania) CFR Cluj | 6 | 3 | 1 | 2 | 9 | 7 | +2 | 10 | Transfer to Europa League | 1–2 | 1–3 | — | 3–1 |
| 4 | (Portugal) Braga | 6 | 1 | 0 | 5 | 7 | 13 | −6 | 3 | | 1–3 | 1–2 | 0–2 | — |

Source: Soccerway

== Knockout phase ==
In the knockout phase, teams played against each other over two legs on a home-and-away basis, except for the one-match final. The mechanism of the draws for each round is as follows:

- In the draw for the round of 16, the eight group winners were seeded and the eight group runners-up were unseeded. The seeded teams were drawn against the unseeded teams, with the seeded teams hosting the second leg. Teams from the same group or the same association could not be drawn against each other
- In the draws for the quarter-finals onwards, there were no seedings, and teams from the same group or the same association could be drawn against each other

=== Bracket ===
Round of 16
(Portugal) Porto | 1 | 0 | 1
(Spain) Málaga | 0 | 2 | 2
(Ukraine) Shakhtar Donetsk | 2 | 0 | 2
(Germany) Borussia Dortmund | 2 | 3 | 5
(Spain) Real Madrid | 1 | 2 | 3
(England) Manchester United | 1 | 1 | 2
(Turkey) Galatasaray | 1 | 3 | 4
(Germany) Schalke 04 | 1 | 2 | 3
(England) Arsenal | 1 | 2 | 3
(Germany) Bayern Munich (a) | 3 | 0 | 3
(Scotland) Celtic | 0 | 0 | 0
(Italy) Juventus | 3 | 2 | 5
(Spain) Valencia | 1 | 1 | 2
(France) Paris Saint-Germain | 2 | 1 | 3
(Italy) Milan | 2 | 0 | 2
(Spain) Barcelona | 0 | 4 | 4

Quarter-finals
(Spain) Málaga | 0 | 2 | 2
(Germany) Borussia Dortmund | 0 | 3 | 3
(Spain) Real Madrid | 3 | 2 | 5
(Turkey) Galatasaray | 0 | 3 | 3
(Germany) Bayern Munich | 2 | 2 | 4
(Italy) Juventus | 0 | 0 | 0
(France) Paris Saint-Germain | 2 | 1 | 3
(Spain) Barcelona (a) | 2 | 1 | 3

Semi-finals
(Germany) Borussia Dortmund | 4 | 0 | 4
(Spain) Real Madrid | 1 | 2 | 3
(Germany) Bayern Munich | 4 | 3 | 7
(Spain) Barcelona | 0 | 0 | 0

Final
25 May – London
(Germany) Borussia Dortmund | 1
(Germany) Bayern Munich | 2

=== Round of 16 ===
The draw for the round of 16 was held on 20 December 2012. The first legs were played on 12, 13, 19 and 20 February, and the second legs were played on 5, 6, 12 and 13 March 2013.

A moment of silence was held before the Borussia Dortmund v Shakhtar Donetsk second leg to commemorate the victims of the crash of South Airlines Flight 8971, which had been filled mostly with football fans heading for the match.

| Team 1 | Agg. | Team 2 | 1st leg | 2nd leg |
|---|---|---|---|---|
| Galatasaray (Turkey) | 4–3 | (Germany) Schalke 04 | 1–1 | 3–2 |
| Celtic (Scotland) | 0–5 | (Italy) Juventus | 0–3 | 0–2 |
| Arsenal (England) | 3–3 (a) | (Germany) Bayern Munich | 1–3 | 2–0 |
| Shakhtar Donetsk (Ukraine) | 2–5 | (Germany) Borussia Dortmund | 2–2 | 0–3 |
| Milan (Italy) | 2–4 | (Spain) Barcelona | 2–0 | 0–4 |
| Real Madrid (Spain) | 3–2 | (England) Manchester United | 1–1 | 2–1 |
| Valencia (Spain) | 2–3 | (France) Paris Saint-Germain | 1–2 | 1–1 |
| Porto (Portugal) | 1–2 | (Spain) Málaga | 1–0 | 0–2 |

=== Quarter-finals ===
The draw for the quarter-finals was held on 15 March 2013. The first legs were played on 2 and 3 April, and the second legs were played on 9 and 10 April 2013.

| Team 1 | Agg. | Team 2 | 1st leg | 2nd leg |
|---|---|---|---|---|
| Málaga (Spain) | 2–3 | (Germany) Borussia Dortmund | 0–0 | 2–3 |
| Real Madrid (Spain) | 5–3 | (Turkey) Galatasaray | 3–0 | 2–3 |
| Paris Saint-Germain (France) | 3–3 (a) | (Spain) Barcelona | 2–2 | 1–1 |
| Bayern Munich (Germany) | 4–0 | (Italy) Juventus | 2–0 | 2–0 |

=== Semi-finals ===
The draw for the semi-finals was held on 12 April 2013. The first legs were played on 23 and 24 April, and the second legs were played on 30 April and 1 May 2013.

| Team 1 | Agg. | Team 2 | 1st leg | 2nd leg |
|---|---|---|---|---|
| Bayern Munich (Germany) | 7–0 | (Spain) Barcelona | 4–0 | 3–0 |
| Borussia Dortmund (Germany) | 4–3 | (Spain) Real Madrid | 4–1 | 0–2 |

=== Final ===
The final was played on 25 May 2013 at Wembley Stadium in London, England. A draw was held on 12 April 2013, after the semi-final draw, to determine the "home" team for administrative purposes.

25 May 2013
19:45 UTC+1

| Borussia Dortmund (Germany) | 1–2 | (Germany) Bayern Munich |
|---|---|---|
| Gündoğan 68' (pen.) | Report | Mandžukić 60'; Robben 89' |

Wembley Stadium, London
Attendance: 86,298
Referee: Nicola Rizzoli (Italy)

== Statistics ==
Statistics exclude qualifying rounds and play-off round.

=== Top goalscorers ===
| Rank | Player | Team | Goals | Minutes played |
|---|---|---|---|---|
| 1 | (Portugal) Cristiano Ronaldo | (Spain) Real Madrid | 12 | 1080 |
| 2 | (Poland) Robert Lewandowski | (Germany) Borussia Dortmund | 10 | 1090 |
| 3 | (Turkey) Burak Yılmaz | (Turkey) Galatasaray | 8 | 767 |
| 3 | (Argentina) Lionel Messi | (Spain) Barcelona | 8 | 826 |
| 3 | (Germany) Thomas Müller | (Germany) Bayern Munich | 8 | 1045 |
| 6 | (Brazil) Oscar | (England) Chelsea | 5 | 449 |
| 6 | (Brazil) Jonas | (Spain) Valencia | 5 | 451 |
| 6 | (Brazil) Alan | (Portugal) Braga | 5 | 492 |
| 6 | (France) Karim Benzema | (Spain) Real Madrid | 5 | 532 |
| 6 | (Argentina) Ezequiel Lavezzi | (France) Paris Saint-Germain | 5 | 572 |

=== Squad of the season ===
The UEFA technical observers selected the following 23 players as the squad of the tournament.

| Pos. | Player | Team |
|---|---|---|
| GK | (Germany) Roman Weidenfeller | (Germany) Borussia Dortmund |
| GK | (Germany) Manuel Neuer | (Germany) Bayern Munich |
| GK | (Spain) Diego López | (Spain) Real Madrid |
| DF | (Brazil) Dani Alves | (Spain) Barcelona |
| DF | (Italy) Leonardo Bonucci | (Italy) Juventus |
| DF | (Germany) Philipp Lahm | (Germany) Bayern Munich |
| DF | (Brazil) Thiago Silva | (France) Paris Saint-Germain |
| DF | (Brazil) Dante | (Germany) Bayern Munich |
| DF | (Spain) Sergio Ramos | (Spain) Real Madrid |
| MF | (Germany) Mario Götze | (Germany) Borussia Dortmund |
| MF | (Germany) İlkay Gündoğan | (Germany) Borussia Dortmund |
| MF | (Spain) Andrés Iniesta | (Spain) Barcelona |
| MF | (Italy) Andrea Pirlo | (Italy) Juventus |
| MF | (Netherlands) Arjen Robben | (Germany) Bayern Munich |
| MF | (Germany) Bastian Schweinsteiger | (Germany) Bayern Munich |
| FW | (Sweden) Zlatan Ibrahimović | (France) Paris Saint-Germain |
| FW | (Germany) Thomas Müller | (Germany) Bayern Munich |
| FW | (Poland) Robert Lewandowski | (Germany) Borussia Dortmund |
| FW | (Portugal) Cristiano Ronaldo | (Spain) Real Madrid |
| FW | (Argentina) Lionel Messi | (Spain) Barcelona |
| FW | (Netherlands) Robin van Persie | (England) Manchester United |
| FW | (France) Franck Ribéry | (Germany) Bayern Munich |
| FW | (Wales) Gareth Bale | (England) Tottenham Hotspur |

== Prize money ==
For the 2012–13 season, UEFA awarded €2.1 million to each team in the play-off round. For reaching the group stage, UEFA awarded a base fee of €8.6 million. A win in the group was awarded €1 million and a draw was worth €500,000. In addition, UEFA paid teams reaching the first knockout round €3.5 million, each quarter-finalist €3.9 million, €4.9 million for each semi-finalist, €6.5 million for the runners-up and €10.5 million for the winners.

- Playoffs: €2,100,000
- Base fee for group stage: €8,600,000
- Group match victory: €1,000,000
- Group match draw: €500,000
- Round of 16: €3,500,000
- Quarter-finals: €3,900,000
- Semi-finals: €4,900,000
- Losing finalist: €6,500,000
- Winning the Final: €10,500,000

A large part of the distributed revenue from the UEFA Champions League is linked to the "market pool", the distribution of which is determined by the value of the television market in each country. For the 2012–13 season, Juventus, who were eliminated on quarter-finals, earned nearly €65.3 million in total of which €20.5 million was prize money, compared with the €55.0 million earned by Bayern Munich, who won the tournament and was awarded with €35.9 million of prize money.

== See also ==
- 2012–13 UEFA Europa League
- 2013 UEFA Super Cup
- 2013 FIFA Club World Cup
- 2012–13 UEFA Women's Champions League
