= Recreation Ground, Llansantffraid-ym-Mechain =

Football stadium in Llansantffraid-ym-Mechain, Wales

Recreation Ground
- Treflan
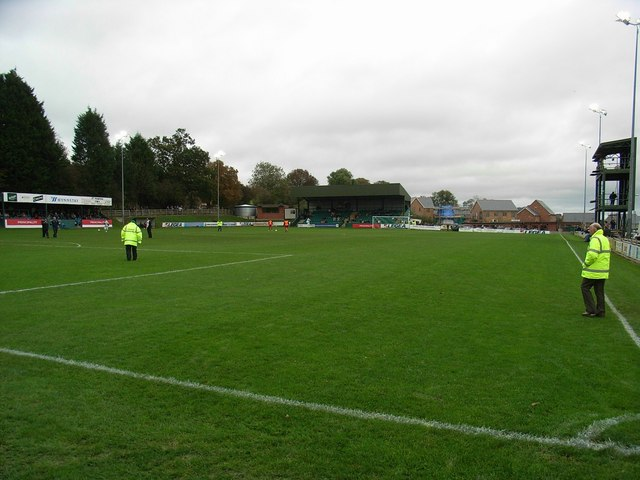
- Interactive map of Recreation Ground
- Full name: Recreation Ground
- Location: Llansantffraid-ym-Mechain; Powys; Wales
- Coordinates: 52°46′32″N 3°9′13″W
- Capacity: 2,000 (1,000 seated)
- Surface: Grass

Tenants
- Llansantffraid Village (2007–present); The New Saints (1959–2007)

The Recreation Ground, usually referred to as Treflan, is a football stadium in Llansantffraid-ym-Mechain, Powys, Wales and is the home of Mid Wales League Division One club Llansantffraid Village. The Recreation Ground was the home of Welsh Premier League team The New Saints until they moved to Park Hall in nearby Oswestry, England, the former home of Oswestry Town.

== History ==
Llansantffraid F.C., which later became Total Network Solutions used the Recreation Ground as their home ground since 1959, though it had been used as the centre of football in Llansantffraid-ym-Mechain prior to this. Up until 1990, the Recreation Ground had no stands or clubhouse, which required players to change in a nearby pub. Being a recreation ground, it was also used to graze cows requiring clearing of cow dung before each match. They also used to play in the Welsh Premier League. In 2003, Total Network Solutions merged with Oswestry Town with the agreement that the majority of matches would be played at the Recreation Ground.

In 2005, it was announced that Total Network Solutions, later renamed The New Saints, would leave the Recreation Ground and move to Oswestry Town's old Park Hall ground in England following redevelopment. The move was made because The New Saints were unable to improve the Recreation Ground to bring it up to UEFA standards for European competition as it was a council owned recreation ground. This came after Total Network Solutions were obliged to move their UEFA Champions League match against Liverpool F.C. to Wrexham's Racecourse Ground because the Recreation Ground was not big enough to meet UEFA standards. Despite The New Saints leaving the Recreation Ground, chairman Mike Harris stated following the purchase of Total Network Solutions by British Telecom, that he still intended for The New Saints to run the Recreation Ground. As a result, the Recreation Ground was still used by The New Saints' youth teams. This was a reversal of the original situation following the merger of Total Network Solutions and Oswestry Town whereby the first team played at the Recreation Ground while the club's reserve, youth and ladies teams played at Park Hall.

In 2007, the Recreation Ground was proposed by The New Saints as a potential venue for the FAW Premier Cup final after they opposed the selection of their final opponent Newport County's Newport Stadium being selected as the venue when they expected a neutral venue. However the Football Association of Wales rejected this as BBC Wales had requested it and the Recreation Ground "was not considered suitable and did not have the infrastructure required".

As a result of The New Saints moving to Oswestry, a number of Llansantffraid-ym-Mechain residents broke away from The New Saints to form Llansantffraid Village because of The New Saints were no longer playing regularly in the village and because most of the youth team's players were not from Llansantffraid-ym-Mechain. Llansantffraid Village then started to use the Recreation Ground for their matches in the Montgomeryshire Football League. Following this, the Recreation Ground became viewed as a public youth club. The Recreation Ground later became a target for vandalism with one occasion, vandals threw used nappies on the pitch and a fifth of the Recreation Ground's bucket seats were damaged.

== Attendance ==
The highest attendance recorded at the Recreation Ground was 1,996 for a pre-season friendly between The New Saints (then known as "Total Network Solutions") and Chelsea on 9 August 2002. The Recreation Ground's record attendance in the league stands at 1,042, set at a Welsh Premier League game between The New Saints and Rhyl on 23 January 2005.
