= Cledwyn Hughes (author) =

Welsh writer (1920–1978)

John Cledwyn Hughes (1920–1978), who wrote under the name Cledwyn Hughes, was an Anglo-Welsh writer of novels, children's books, and literary-topographical books about Wales. He was also a prolific short-story writer who was published in a wide range of popular and literary magazines including The New Yorker, Argosy and Woman and Home.

The Oxford Companion to the Literature of Wales cites The Civil Strangers (Phoenix House, 1950) as his most distinguished work and notes the fineness of his topographical writing, and of his writing for children.

Hughes was born at Llansantffraid-ym-Mechain in Montgomeryshire, and died at Arthog, Merionethshire, where he and his wife Alyna lived from 1947. An archive of his papers is held at the National Library of Wales.

== Major works ==
=== Novels ===
- The Different Drummer and The Inn Closes for Christmas: two novels (Pilot Press, 1947)
- Wennon (Pilot Press, 1948)
- The Civil Strangers (Phoenix House, 1950)
- After the Holiday (Phoenix House, 1950)
- The House in the Cornfield - semi-autobiographical (Werner Laurie, 1957)

=== Topographical writing ===
- A Wanderer in North Wales (Phoenix House, 1949)
- The Northern Marches (Robert Hale, 1953)
- Poaching down the Dee (Robert Hale, 1953)
- Royal Wales (Phoenix House, 1957)
- West with the Tinkers (Odham Press, 1951)
- Portrait of Snowdonia (Robert Hale, 1967)
- The Batsford Colour Book of Wales (Batsford, 1975)

=== Children's books ===
- Gold and "The Moonspray" (Heinemann, 1953)
- The King Who Lived on Jelly (Routledge and Kegan Paul,1961)

=== Other full-length works ===
- Leonard Cheshire V. C. (Phoenix House, 1961)
- Ponies for Children (Routledge and Kegan Paul, 1962)
- Making an Orchard (Land Books, 1961)

=== International and translated editions ===
- He Dared not Look Behind (A A Wyn, 1949) – Title under which 'The Inn Closes for Christmas was published' in USA and Canada
- La Jambe de Cain (Gallimard, 1963) – French edition of the above
- The King Who Lived on Jelly (Special Edition, Georgian House, Melbourne, Australia, 1969)

== Short stories and broadcast works ==
Over 250 short stories are known to have been published by Cledwyn Hughes. The first recorded published story being in 1943 ('Their Secret Sorrows' in the Weekly Telegraph). The manuscripts of the majority of stories are available to researchers in the National Library of Wales archives.

=== Stories published 1943-1949 ===
The Confession	Selected Writing, No. 3, Nicholson and Watson 1946
The Housekeeper	Stories for All Moods, Pendulum Publications
The Necessity	Moore (ed.), Modern Reading 11-12, Wells Gardner, Darton, 1945
The Unqualified	Aistrop & Moore (eds.), Bugle Blast: A Third Anthology From the Services, Allen & Unwin, 1945
Open up Them Pearly Gates	Tattoo
The Basket	BBC Midland/Welsh Home Service, 20 Dec 1946
The Fifteen Shilling Marvel	Argosy, Nov 1946,
The Heart of Mr Thomas	Our Time, December
The Hedghog	Vaughan (ed.), Celtic Story, Pendulum, 1946
The Miracle	Life and Letters, March 1946
A Well Sung Carol	John Bull Magazine, Christmas Issue, 1947
Geekie's First Christmas	BBC Children's Hour, 21 December 1947, all regions
Life After Death	Cronos' [?] Ohio State University Review
Love Lit with Paraffin	John Bull Magazine, March? 1947
Pritchard's Bees	Wyatt (ed.), English Story 7th Series, Collins, 1947
Reece the Poles	John Bull Magazine, 15 November 1947
The Man who once Grew Christmas Trees	Harper's Bazaar Xmas Issue 1947
The Stepping Stones	Virginian Quarterly Review, June 1947
A Bucketful of Roses	Argosy, Oct 1948
An Armful of Wasps	John Bull Magazine, 26 June 1948
Cras and his Lucky Christmas	Lilliput Magazine, December 1948
Geekie's Wonderful Christmas	BBC Children's Hour, Welsh Home Service, 16 December 1948
How Shone the Tinker Retired	John Bull Magazine, 16 October 1948
Mr Pugh's Marmalade	Woman's Magazine, April 1949
None so Blind	John Bull Magazine, 26 March 1948
Poaching the Ungodly Way	Strand Magazine, accepted September 1947, Published April 1948
Preece and his Duty	John Bull Magazine, 17 June 1948
Salty Jones	BBC Midland Region, 26 November 1948
The Best Dressed Horse	Argosy, April 1948
The Bright Gentleman	John Bull Magazine, 4 September 1948
The Christmas Acceptance	Weldons Ladies Journal, December 1948
The Circus	John Bull Magazine, 21 Feb 1948
The Leaf which Never Died	BBC Children's Hour, 14 April 1949
The Little Bishop	Argosy, Aug 1948
The New Shearer	John Bull Magazine, 17 April 1948
The Poachers	The Strand, 115(688), April 1948
The Remarkable Cider	John Bull Magazine, 16 December 1948
The Saint's Well	John Bull Magazine, 7 August 1948
The Tomato Plant	John Bull Magazine, 3 February 1949
Thomas at the Fair	John Bull Magazine, 18 November 1948
Miss Rees	
A Little Rehearsal	John Bull Magazine, 15 April 1950
A Night Among the Roses	John Bull Magazine, 10 November 1949
A Tin Whistle at Christmas	John Bull Magazine, 23 December 1949
A Windmill and Twelve Cherry Trees	
Black Maggie	Argosy, Dec 1949
Counting his Sundays	Weldons Ladies Journal, July 1949
Geekie and the Cuckoo Clock	Woman's Illustrated, [dates?] 1949
Geekie, Father Christmas, and the Remarkable Snowman	Woman's Illustrated, 24 December 1949
Grower of lavender and professor of magic	English Story' edited by Woodrow Wyatt, London, Collins
The Black Horse	Pudney (ed.), The Pick of Today's Short Stories, Odhams, n.d.
The Carnival	John Bull Magazine, 9 September 1949
The Christmas Mattress	Sketch, 21 December 1949
The Curious Captain of the Golden Rhubarb	BBC Special Children's story for Xmas morning,
The Extraordinary Mr Ambrose	John Bull Magazine, 30 June 1949
The Visitation	Argosy, Jan 1949
Women from Distant Places	John Bull Magazine, 4 June 1949

=== Stories published 1950-1959 ===
A First Marvel	Weldons (accepted 11 September 1950]
Five Good Dogs with Cold Noses	Home Magazine
How Geekie Became a Chimney Sweep	Weldons, May 1955
Jenkins One Eye	John Bull Magazine, 21 January 1950
Miss Pugh and the Bishop	Lilliput Magazine, February 1951
The Atishoo Symphony Orchestra	Woman's Illustrated, [accepted 8 September 1950]
The Lamb with the Tongue of Gold	Woman's Illustrated, March 1956
The Return of Meri	John Bull Magazine, 1 November 1950
The Seller of Sunshine and Controller of Rainbows	Home Journal, February 1956
The Two Musicians	John Bull Magazine, 9 September 1950
Towzer's Toothache	Woman's Illustrated
All Tomorrow's Flowers	Argosy
Emma and the Strong Man	John Bull Magazine, Summer Pie, 12 June 1952
Geekie and the Firework Factory	Woman's Illustrated, [published 1956?]
Samuel Pugh's Bullfight	Lilliput Magazine, May 1951
The Dance	Pudney (ed.), The Pick of Today's Short Stories 3rdSeries, Odhams n.d.
Moses and the Policeman	John Bull Magazine, 15 November 1952
The Old Fashioned Farm	Good Housekeeping, November 1953
The Ploughing Match	John Bull Magazine, 9 May 1953
A Wheel for a Queen	John Bull Magazine 22 April 1953
An Umbrella from the Sea	John Bull Magazine 10 June 1953
The Last Thatcher	John Bull Magazine, 28 October 1953
The Almond Tumblers	Woman's journal, August 1956
The Corn Harvest	John Bull Magazine, 25 August 1954
The First Snow	Woman, 26 February 1955
The girl who wanted to dance	Brittania and Eve Magazine, October 1954
The Gramophone with the Green Horn	Pudney (ed.), The Pick of Today's Short Stories 5, Putnam, 1954
The Great Ash of Glas Coed	Argosy, June 1954
The Master of the Golden Game	John Bull Magazine, 5 May 1954
The Venerable Dog Event	Woman's Journal, August 1957
The White Pony	John Bull Magazine, 10 February 1954
Time to Visit the World	Weldons Ladies Journal, February 1954
How Geekie Saved Maurice the Mole	Woman and Home, September 1955
The Eternal Goddess	BBC Welsh Home Service, Tuesday 3, September 1957
The Young and the Old Victorias	John Bull Magazine, 12 November 1955
A Maythorn for a Monument	Brittania and Eve Magazine, February 1956
A Yellow Ribbon	John Bull Magazine
The Skipper's Wife	John Bull Magazine, 11 April 1956
A Relic of the War	Evening Standard, 27 November 1957
Champion at the Golden Eagle	John Bull Magazine, 10 August 1957
The Mountain Main	Lilliput Magazine, November 1957
The Singing Football Match	John Bull Magazine, 19 January 1957
A Final Danger	Argosy/Woman's Journal [author's own query],
A Punch on the Nose for London	Evening Standard, 5 November 1958
The Cockle Gatherer	Argosy, Sept 1958
The Perfect Canary	John Bull Magazine, 1 March 1958
A Song Before Winter	BBC Home Service, London, 18 November 1959, 10.30 pm
Only a Green Shutter	Home (Fleetway Publications), Month? 1959
The Stock Car Race	Good Housekeeping, January 1961
The Strong Room	Suspense, October 1959
The Sugar Enchantress	Homes and Gardens

=== Stories published 1960-1973 ===
Johnny's Miracle	BBC, Morning Story, Wales Region, 26 February 1960
A Dance on the Lawn	Saturday Evening Post, June 1961?
Jericho and the Jumble Sale	Woman's Journal, June 1961
The White Stranger	The Evening News, 27 July 1961
A Journey for a Fragment of Snow	
Our Miss Juliet	Housewife or Woman's Realm, September 1963
The Answer is not the echo	
Just a few Bees	Modern Caravan, June, 1964
An Emotion of the Sea	Homes and Gardens, October 1965
Jazz Pony	Homes and Gardens, October 1964
Mary will Answer the Puppet	Woman's Day, USA, December 1964
The Coming of the Honey	Homes and Gardens, August 1966
The Green Eye in the Window	Homes and Gardens, August 1965
The Pony with the Strong Voice	Woman's Realm, 20 March 1965
A Day by the Ocean	Parents' Magazine, February, 1965
A Talent for Devotion	Woman's Realm, 18 October 1965
An Occasion for Music	She Magazine, December 1965
A Remembrance of Innocent Days	Woman's Mirror, accepted 2 August 1966
A Sort of Weather from the Seasons of Love	Woman's Realm, 30 September 1967
A Little White Powder, as Important as Life Itself	Men Only, May 1967
Longing for the Glorious Years	Argosy, June 1967
Taking a Bird on Honeymoon	Argosy, Oct 1967
There's a Cow Outside	Homes and Gardens, August, 1967
A Universe of Roses and Dreams	? Accepted 23 November 1968
The Gentle Harpist [?]	Weekend, 13 August 1969
The Old Strollers' Carol Party	Argosy, Jan 1969
The Race for the White Rose	Argosy, May 1973
The Yard Man	Argosy, March 1973
Crying Off and On for a Fortnight	Rostrum, November/December 1972
A Handful of Leaves	Rostrum, March 1973
When the World is Calling	Anglo-Welsh Review, Spring (May), 1975
Night of the Summer Storm	Argosy, Aug 1973

=== Broadcast works ===
- "Charles Macintosh" - BBC Children's Hour
- "The Basket"- BBC Midlands/Wales
- "The Black Horse" - BBC French Service
- "Watkins and the Fairies", - BBC Children's Hour
- "Geekie's First Christmas" - BBC Children's Hour
- "Geekie's Wonderful Christmas" - BBC Children's Hour
- "Pritchard's Bees" - BBC, The Wednesday Story
- "Salty Jones" - BBC Midland Home Service and internationally
- "The Leaf which Never Died" - BBC Children's Hour
- "Grower of Lavender and Professor of Magic" - BBC Norwegian Service
- "The Curious Captain of the Golden Rhubarb" - BBC Children's Xmas Morning story read by Norman Shelley)
- "November Day" - Welsh Home Service
- "The Church by the Sea" with Donald Huston - BBC Home Service, Welsh
- "Seasons in Powys" - BBC Home Service Welsh
- "Spring Comes to Wales" with Donald Huston - BBC Home Service
- "The Eternal Goddess" - BBC Welsh Home Service
- "Winter Estuary" - BBC Welsh Home Service
- "The Lamb with the Tongue of Gold" - BBC Children's Hour
- "The Gramophone with the Green Horn: A story of the open road" and - BBC Saturday Matinee
- "A Song Before Winter" with Carleton Hobbs - BBC Home Service
- "A School by the Rose Garden" - produced by Wilbert Lloyd Roberts Welsh Home Service and Home Service
- "Christmas near a Green Mountain" - BBC Wales Home Service
- "Johnny's Miracle" - BBC Morning Story
- "The Green Eye in the Window" - BBC Morning Story
- "Jericho and the Jumble Sale" with Dillwyn wen - BBC Morning Story
- "Taking a Bird on Honeymoon" - BBC Morning Story
- "The Old Strollers' Carol Party" - South African Broadcasting Corporation

== Critical response and legacy ==
Hughes's writing had an international reach and received attention in a wide range of literary and popular publications. His writing is described in contemporary reviews as poetic, showing whimsy and melancholia, or at times a darker sentiment. The Spectator (7 February 1947) welcomed the first longer works by Hughes (The Inn Closes for Christmas and The Different Drummer) describing them as 'Two vivid short novels by a brilliant young Welshman whose short stories have already established his reputation'.
