= Mike Harris (businessman) =

Welsh businessman and football chairman

- Born: Welshpool, Wales
- Education: Buttington Trewern County Primary School; Welshpool High School
- Occupations: Entrepreneur; Football chairman
- Years active: 1980s-present
- Known for: Co-founder of Total Network Solutions; Chairman of The New Saints F.C. Co-founder of SiFi Networks

Mike Harris is a Welsh businessman and football chairman. He is the founder of Total Network Solutions, a telecom solutions provider that was acquired by British Telecom in 2005. In 2013, he founded SiFi Networks to provide open access Internet in North America.

Since the late 1990s, he has been involved with The New Saints F.C., becoming the club's chairman in 2003. The New Saints broke Ajax's top flight record of consecutive wins, after recording 27 wins in a row in 2016.

== Education and early career ==
Harris was born in Welshpool in Wales. He attended Buttington Trewern County Primary School, before Welshpool High School. He left school aged 16, securing an apprenticeship with British Telecom. The apprenticeship lasted three years, where he specialised as a strowger engineer. Around this time, he moved to Shrewsbury to work as part of the maintenance team for BT's telephone exchange.

== Business career ==
=== Total Network Solutions (1987-2005) ===
Harris worked in telephone maintenance, including trouble shooting, and in BT's computer centers implementing distributed data to the desktop until the late 1980s, when System X was introduced as a digital switching system to modernise the exchange. Harris saw a gap in the market where businesses were introducing voice and data systems to the desktop and saw the opportunity to set up his own business. Harris collaborated with Roger Samuels while working on a project for one of his clients, adopting Harris’ vision. In 1991, they decided to merge the two consultancies to form Total Network Solutions (TNS).

Total Network Solutions continued to offer the consultancy service Harris had been doing since 1988, but also offered the design, implementation and maintenance of telecom solutions. The new approach was to take products and the consultancy, combine them to create solutions and then take responsibility for delivering the solutions to business. TNS achieved half a million turnover in its first year. He and co-founder Samuels imported technology from the United States, which gave the company an edge over other providers in both cost and the advanced technology. By 1993, TNS had grown to £18 million turnover and a staff of 120 people. TNS featured - on three occasions - in the Financial Times' Top 100 Fastest Growing Companies during this period.

In the mid-1990s, TNS began to maintain Cisco Systems. This allowed them to secure numerous notable clients such as the University of Bath, Abbey National Bank, and Heinz Foods. They installed high speed lines for various university campuses and other large site institutions such as hospitals or councils. TNS also supplied and maintained datacomms for many early internet providers in the UK, such as BusinessNet, AOL, and Level Three. In 2000, Harris became the sole owner of TNS after buying out his business partner Samuels.

Harris and TNS then played a major role in the rollout of broadband infrastructure in the United Kingdom. This included many areas of the UK, such as Anglesey, which were overlooked by those managing fibre expansion. The success of TNS led to Harris winning the Ernst & Young Technology and Communication Entrepreneur of the Year in 2001 and also a nomination for the same award in 2003. In 2005, British Telecom acquired TNS from Harris in a multi-million pound deal.

=== SiFi Networks & other investments (2013-present) ===
Harris and Roland Pickstock co-founded SiFi Networks to provide privately funded open access, city-wide fibre networks in the United States. The aim was to offer an alternative to the telecomms solutions of the time, where low speeds and only one provider to choose from was common when the business was founded in 2013. In 2021, The company received investments of circa $1 billion from Patrizia and from Dutch pension fund, APG. The funds are being deployed to roll out of fibre networks in the US developing their fibre networks under their fibre city brand in the US, Future Fiber Networks LLC (“Future Fiber”). This has, to date, has included Fullerton, Placentia, East Hartford, Saratoga, New York and Kenosha, Wisconsin.

== The New Saints Football Club ==
In 2005, Total Network Solutions famously hosted Champions League winners Liverpool in the qualifying round in the defence of their title. Harris sold Total Network Solutions to British Telecom and exited the business he co-founded. At the time, he was serving as both the managing director of TNS and chairman of the Welsh football club of the same name.

Shortly after the sale to British Telecom, Harris announced the football club would be moving to Oswestry in Shropshire, England after TNS merged with Oswestry Town Football Club a couple of seasons earlier. The team was given the new name, The New Saints, keeping the well-known abbreviation of TNS. Following the establishment of The New Saints in their new Oswestry home, the football club went through a period of unrivalled success. By 2023, TNS had won the Welsh Premier League 15 times in the previous 23 seasons, making them the most successful Welsh football team in modern history. As the team became more successful on the pitch, so did the club's finances. Harris grew the annual turnover from £40,000 to £2 million a year.

Harris' success at TNS has meant he is often seen as a figurehead of Welsh football, and has been part of the talks for reforming the Welsh Premier League in recent years.

On 22 July, 2026, Harris was charged by the Football Association of Wales with multiple disciplinary offences after he posted an AI generated video of topless women on his Twitter account.

== Philanthropy ==
Harris formed The New Saints Football Club Foundation in 2013 to help those in the local community around the town of Oswestry, Shropshire. Following the model of many football community trusts, The New Saints Foundation benefits the local community by running numerous initiatives to promote health, wellbeing and inclusion, including free universal access summer camps which include free meals for the young people in the area.

The main aim of TNSFC Foundation is to make physical activity accessible to boost health and social inclusion, while also protecting children and young people from risk of harm. All children and young people can benefit from the Foundation, and sessions include rural youth clubs, fun football skills sessions for 4 to 15 year olds, and provision for disabled children and those with special educational needs.

TNSFC Foundation works with various partners and funders to lead and facilitate a diverse range of activities which will promote health, wellbeing and opportunity for the community it serves. The running costs of the Foundation are funded by investments from Harris, while activities and events are funded by fundraising activity and paid-for classes.

Currently, the Foundation works with 15 schools in the local area, providing PE lessons and multi-sport after school clubs during term time, as well as around 4,000 places and free meals annually for school holiday activities.

After school clubs are typically costed – however, TNSFC Foundation aims to make them as affordable as possible in comparison to other provision in the local area. This also allows the Foundation to work with disengaged young people, who may be at risk of crime, anti-social behaviour or face exclusion from school. The Foundation recently secured funding for a 12-month programme to work and support these children following a successful pilot project.

As well as supporting the local youth, TNSFC Foundation has also offered free meals to the older community in the local area and provides opportunities for older members of the community to get active e.g. through walking football and local walking initiatives.
