= Llansantffraid-ym-Mechain =

Village in Powys, Wales

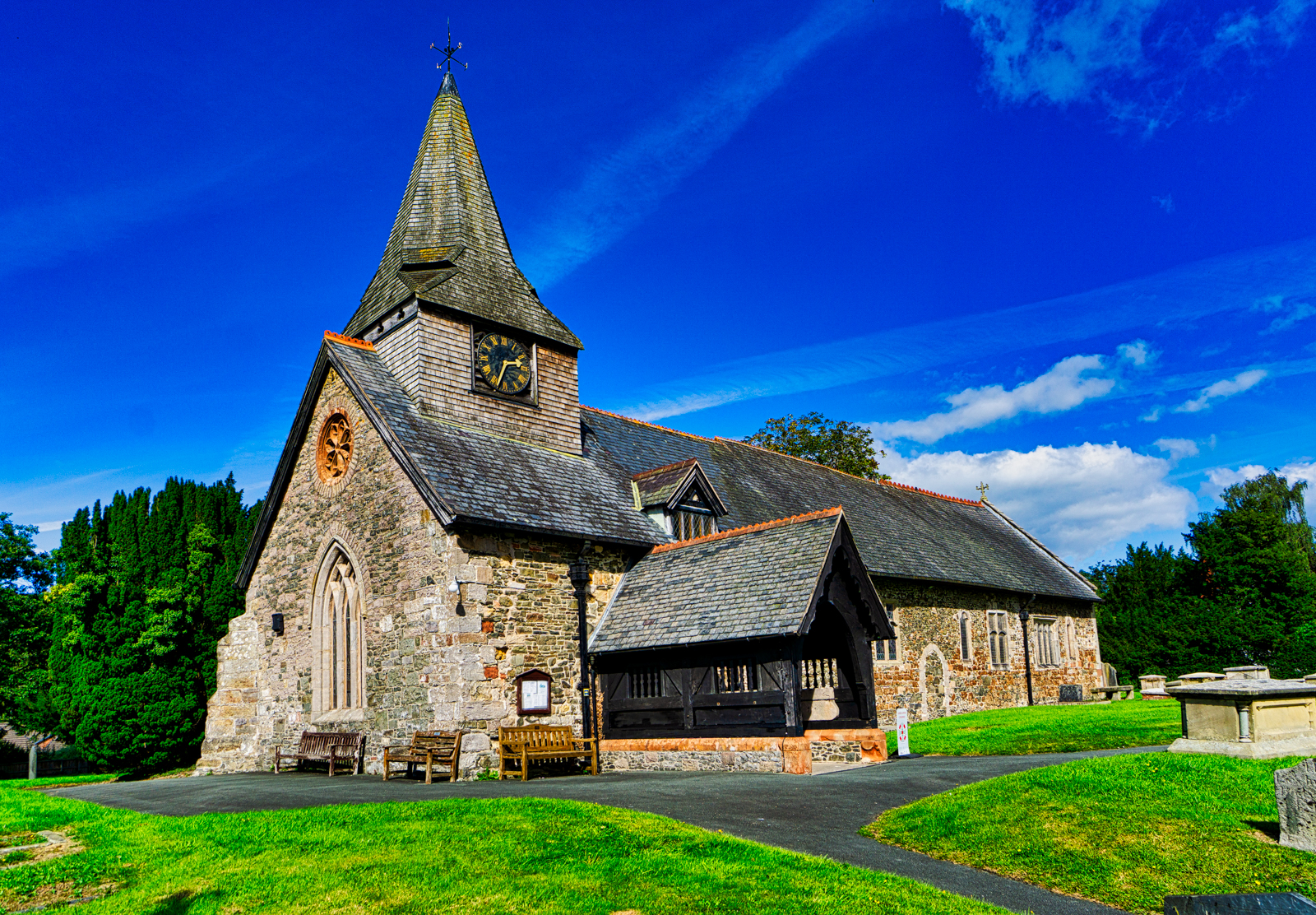
- St Ffraid's Church, Llansantffraid-ym-Mechain

- Location within Powys
- Population: 1,586
- OS grid reference: SJ220203
- Community: Llansantffraid
- Principal area: Powys
- Preserved county: Powys
- Country: Wales
- Sovereign state: United Kingdom
- Post town: LLANSANFFRAID
- Postcode district: SY22
- Dialling code: 01691
- Police: Dyfed-Powys
- Fire: Mid and West Wales
- Ambulance: Welsh
- UK Parliament: Montgomeryshire and Glyndŵr
- Senedd Cymru – Welsh Parliament: Montgomeryshire
- List of places UK Wales Powys 52.775°N 3.157°W Community map: Map of the Llansantffraid community

Llansantffraid-ym-Mechain is a large village in the community of Llansantffraid, in Powys, Mid Wales. It is close to the border with Shropshire in England, about 7 miles (11 km) south-west of Oswestry and 8 miles (13 km) north of Welshpool. It is on the A495 road and is at the confluence of the River Vyrnwy and the River Cain. The population as of the recent estimates was 1,586 . The community includes the village of Deuddwr and several hamlets.

Llansanffraid means "Church of Saint Bride" in the Welsh language; ym Mechain refers to its location in the medieval cantref of Mechain and distinguishes it from other places with the same or similar names.

The name is based on the story of St Bhrid, who is said to have floated across the Irish Sea on a sod of turf, or to have been carried to Scotland by two oystercatchers. The followers of St Bhrid possibly set up new settlements known by the Welsh as Llan Santes Ffraid, Church of (Lady) Saint Bhrid.

In recent years the spelling of the village name, with or without a "t", has been a contentious issue (as it has been at Llansantffraid Glyn Ceiriog).

The community of Llansantffraid was founded in 1987, from the previous communities of Llansantffraid Deythur and Llansantffraid Pool.

== History ==
=== Early settlers ===
Many finds of Bell Beaker pottery, dating from 2400 to 2000 BC, suggest settlement of the area in the Bronze Age. Earlier, Neolithic settlement is likely, though there are currently no such sites known in the immediate area. During the Iron Age, around 700 BC, a trend towards a sedentary lifestyle is evidenced by the increased number of settlements. A small hilltop enclosure was built around 400 BC where inhabitants grew wheat and barley, and kept cattle, sheep and pigs. Aerial photography of the area shows evidence that a pit alignment, possibly Iron Age, is present in the grounds of the nearby Bryn Tanat Hall Hotel.

=== The Romans ===
Archaeological evidence in the area includes a Roman fort in Bronhyddon field adjacent to Cae Hywel orchard. An archaeological excavation at this site revealed a barracks with attached centurion's house.

=== The historic Plas-Yn-Dinas ===
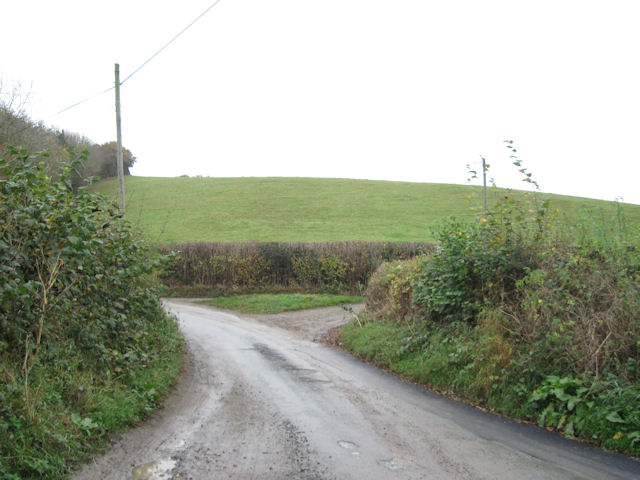
Plas-Yn-Dinas viewed from road

The Plas-Yn-Dinas, 5 km (3.1 mi) west of Offa's Dyke and above the flood plain of the Afon Fyrnwy, is a scheduled ancient monument. It was probably a timber castle but certainly a fortified manor house. It is first recorded in the 14th century as the residence of the lords of Mechain Is Coed. Some of the earthworks could be from the Roman period and it is reputed to be the site of the Roman station of Mediolanum.

=== Y Foel Camp ===
Y Foel Camp is situated on the summit of the Foel Hill, to the west of the Winllan Road. It has many hallmarks of an Iron Age fortification, and there are signs of a rampart and a ditch.

=== Skirmishes and battles ===
Two battles fought within this parish are recorded. Around the middle of the 5th century, a battle is said to have taken place in the township of Llanerch. Emrys wen Pascen induced the Saxons to attack the Welsh. Emerys Benaur was appointed head of the Welsh army, and his victory secured the naming of the township in his honour. These events have no known factual basis.

The second recorded battle was fought between Meredydd and Ithel, sons of Gruffydd ap Llywelyn, on one side and Bleddyn and Rhiwallon on the other. The battle was fought for the crown of Gwynedd and Powys. Ithel and Rhiwallon were slain and Meredydd took flight, leaving Bleddyn the sole king of North Wales and Powys.

== Evolution of the village name ==
The earliest written form in the Book of Llandaff, a 12th-century document, refers to 'Llann sanfreit' in 1066. With so many places named Llansanffraid in Wales it was necessary to add location details, hence Llansanffraid-ym-Mechain (in Mechain) and Llansanffraid Glyn Ceiriog, among others. The earliest written record of Llansanffraid-ym-Mechain is in 1254 as 'Llansanfret'.

In 1526 the name of the village appeared as 'Llansayntefrayde' in an English document. "The 'saynte' suggests an English influence on the Welsh name." The English language tithe maps of the early 1800s use two anglicised forms, 'Llansaintffraid' and 'Llansaintfraid'.

The first Ordnance Survey drawing map by Robert Dawson in 1830 records the spelling of the village name as 'Llansanffraid'.

Welsh place names were often anglicised. For example, when the railway arrived in the village in 1862, the station was called 'Llansaintffraid'. The Border Advertiser was originally a railway company publication to advertise the railway, but as it became a local newspaper it continued to use this spelling.

By the beginning of the 20th century, the 'i' was lost, and the spelling appears to change again. In 1863, Llansantffraid-ym-Mechain had a station on the Llanfyllin Branch Line which connected the village to both the small market town of Llanfyllin and Llanymynech, which was on the Oswestry and Newtown Railway. In 1922 when the Great Western Railway took over the Cambrian Railways, the station name changed to Llansantffraid. The station closed to passengers in 1965 along with the entire branch line as part of the Beeching cuts. The station had a single platform; the entire building remains as a restaurant. The former goods yard is now an industrial estate for Wynnstay, a farm supplies firm.

In 2008, the letter 't' was officially dropped by Powys County Council, which claimed it was correcting a "mistake". Nonetheless, the council's website still referred to the village as "Llansantffraid". On 30 September 2014, the council voted to restore the "missing" 't'. In May 2018, several signs were defaced with a blowtorch, including those found at the entrances to the village and direction signs at Llynclys and Llanyblodwel. The attacks were thought to have taken place overnight. In an interview with the Shropshire Star, Councillor Gwynfor Thomas stated: "It is so frustrating. We have just formed a committee to look at entering the village of the year committee next year and now this happens."

== Notable residents ==
- Kate Williams Evans (1866–1961) – suffragette and campaigner for women's rights
- John Cledwyn Hughes (1920–1978) – Anglo-Welsh writer
- Lol Crawley (born 1974) – cinematographer
- Reece Wiltshire-Fessey (born 2000) – singer

== Football team ==
The local football team, previously known as Total Network Solutions F.C., won the League of Wales in the 1999–2000 season, the first title since changing its name from Llansantffraid FC. Following the takeover of its sponsors, the team was renamed The New Saints F.C. for the 2006–07 season. The New Saints no longer play their football matches in Llansantffraid-ym-Mechain, but in Park Hall, a village in Shropshire, 2 miles (3 km) east of Oswestry. A new team was formed in the village in 2007 called Llansantffraid Village, because some of the old Llansantffraid board members who did not agree with the merger with Oswestry Town F.C., and decided to create a new club called Llansantffraid Village FC in order to give local youngsters the opportunity to play competitive football again and represent their own village. .

== Photographs ==
Photographs from around 1885

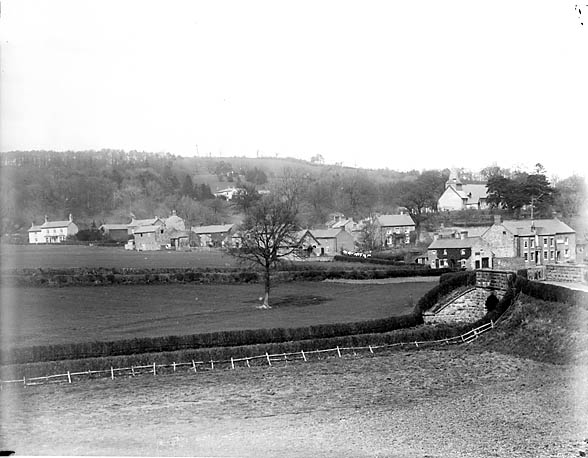
View of Llansantffraid across the river

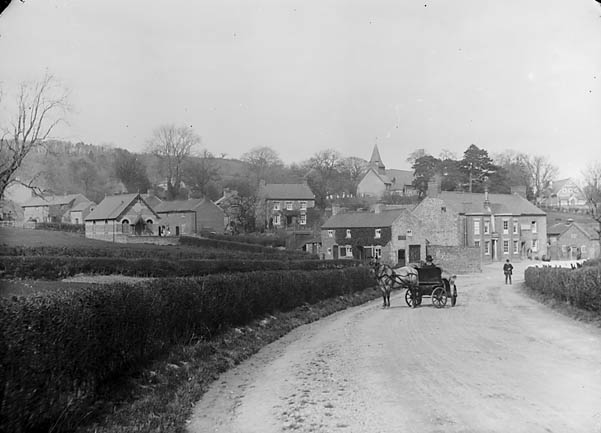
The main road through Llansantffraid

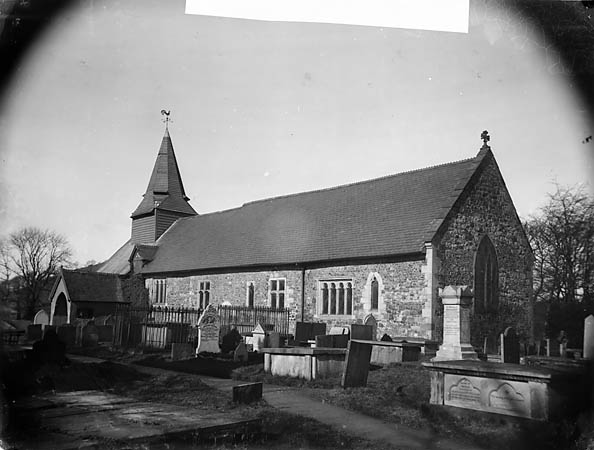
Church of St Ffraid

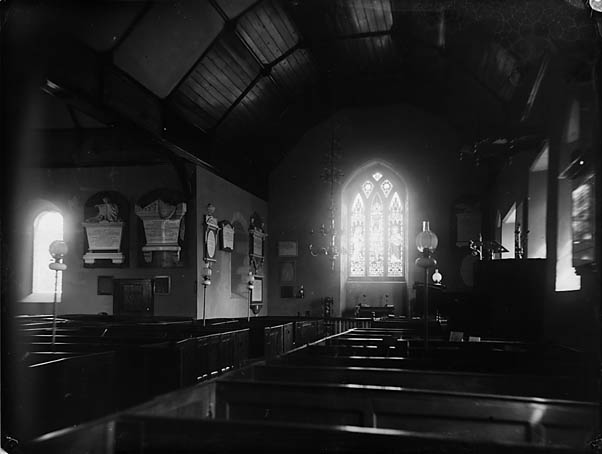
Interior of church of St Ffraid

== See also ==
- Recreation Ground, Llansantffraid-ym-Mechain
