= Bwlch-y-cibau =

Coordinates: 52.748229°N 3.218962°W

Bwlch-y-cibau: Welsh: Bwlch-y-Cibau
- Location within Powys
- OS grid reference: SJ178174
- Principal area: Powys
- Preserved county: Powys
- Country: Wales
- Sovereign state: United Kingdom
- Post town: LLANFYLLIN; LLANSANFFRAID
- Postcode district: SY22
- Dialling code: 01691
- Police: Dyfed-Powys
- Fire: Mid and West Wales
- Ambulance: Welsh
- UK Parliament: Montgomeryshire and Glyndŵr
- Senedd Cymru – Welsh Parliament: Montgomeryshire

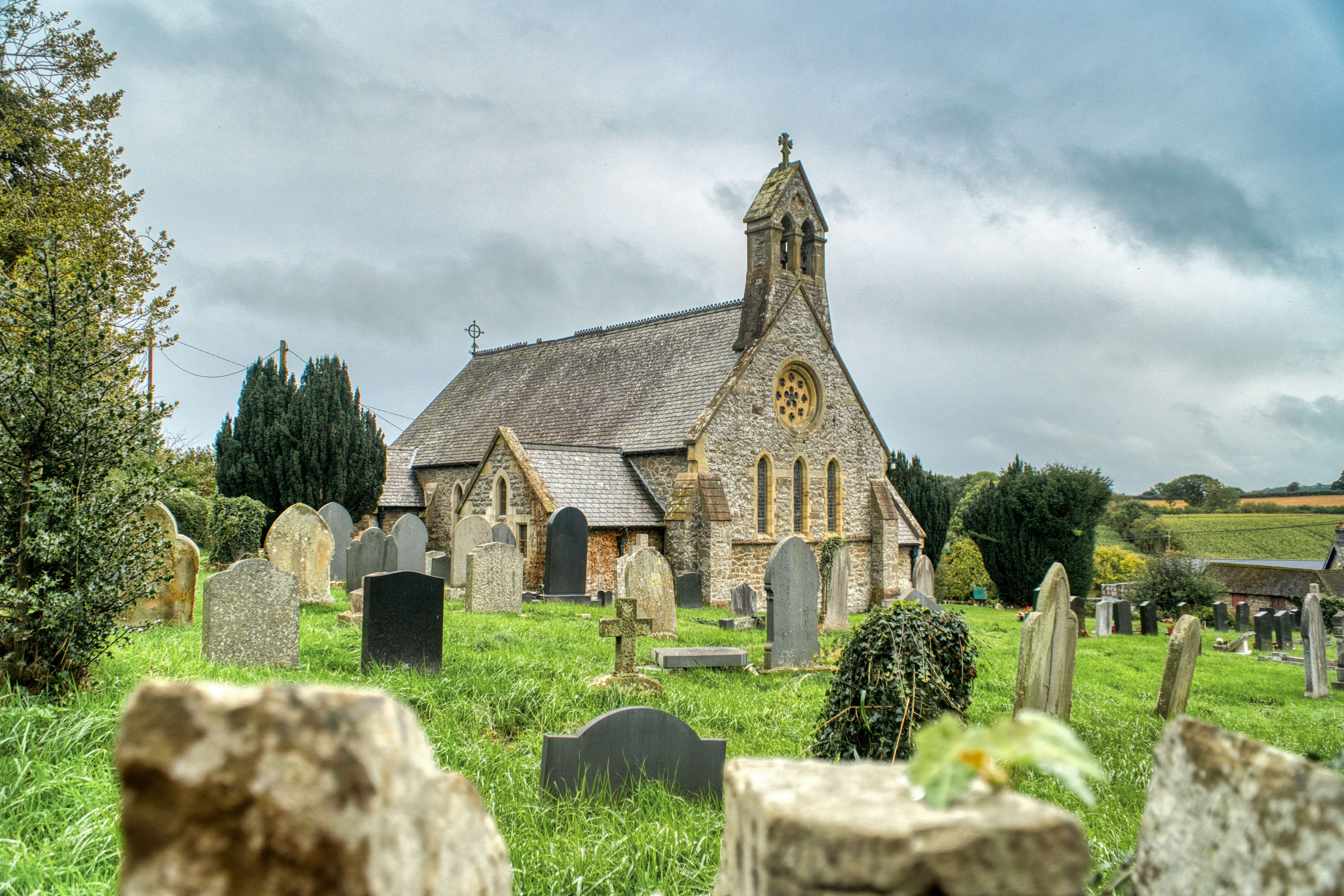
Christ Church Bwlch y Cibau

Bwlch-y-cibau (Welsh for 'pass of the husks') is a small village located between Llanfyllin and Welshpool. It is situated on the A490. It is in the community of Meifod.

== Amenities ==
The village is very rural with only a public house, a church and a former school house.

== Transport ==
The village also was served by the Llanfyllin Branch railway line which was situated on the B493 near Llanfechain. The stop was little more than a halt which was over a mile north of the village. It closed in 1965 along with the line. The nearest railway station is now Welshpool. The village is also served by the bus no. 76 which connects the village to Llanfyllin and Welshpool although only runs five services both ways a day from Monday to Saturday including one additional to serve the nearby Llanfyllin High School.
