= Ysgol Llanfyllin =

Location
- Llanfyllin, Powys; Wales
- Coordinates: 52.7638°N 3.2719°W

Information
- Type: Secondary School
- Opened: 2020
- Local authority: Powys County Council
- Head teacher: Dewi Owen
- Gender: Mixed
- Age: 4 to 18
- Enrolment: 678
- Language: English / Welsh bilingual
- Website: www.llanfyllin-hs.powys.sch.uk

Ysgol Llanfyllin is a bilingual all-through school for ages 4 to 18 in Llanfyllin, Powys. It opened in September 2010 after the merger of Llanfyllin County Primary School and Llanfyllin High School.

In September 2018, plans to merge the two schools were submitted to Powys County Council. It had been forecast that the combined pupil numbers would fall from 844 in January 2019 to 702 in 2023. The plans were approved in March 2019. Consultation for the merger ended with 63% supporting the merger and 29% against. In November 2019, the school's name was decided, and Llanfyllin High School headteacher Dewi Owen was named its headteacher.

As of May 2023, the school had 678 pupils and 424 surplus places. All bar one of the county's eleven secondary or all-through schools had surplus places.

== Notable former pupils ==
- Lol Crawley, cinematographer
