= Bryngwyn Halt railway station =

Disused railway station in Wales

Bryngwyn Halt
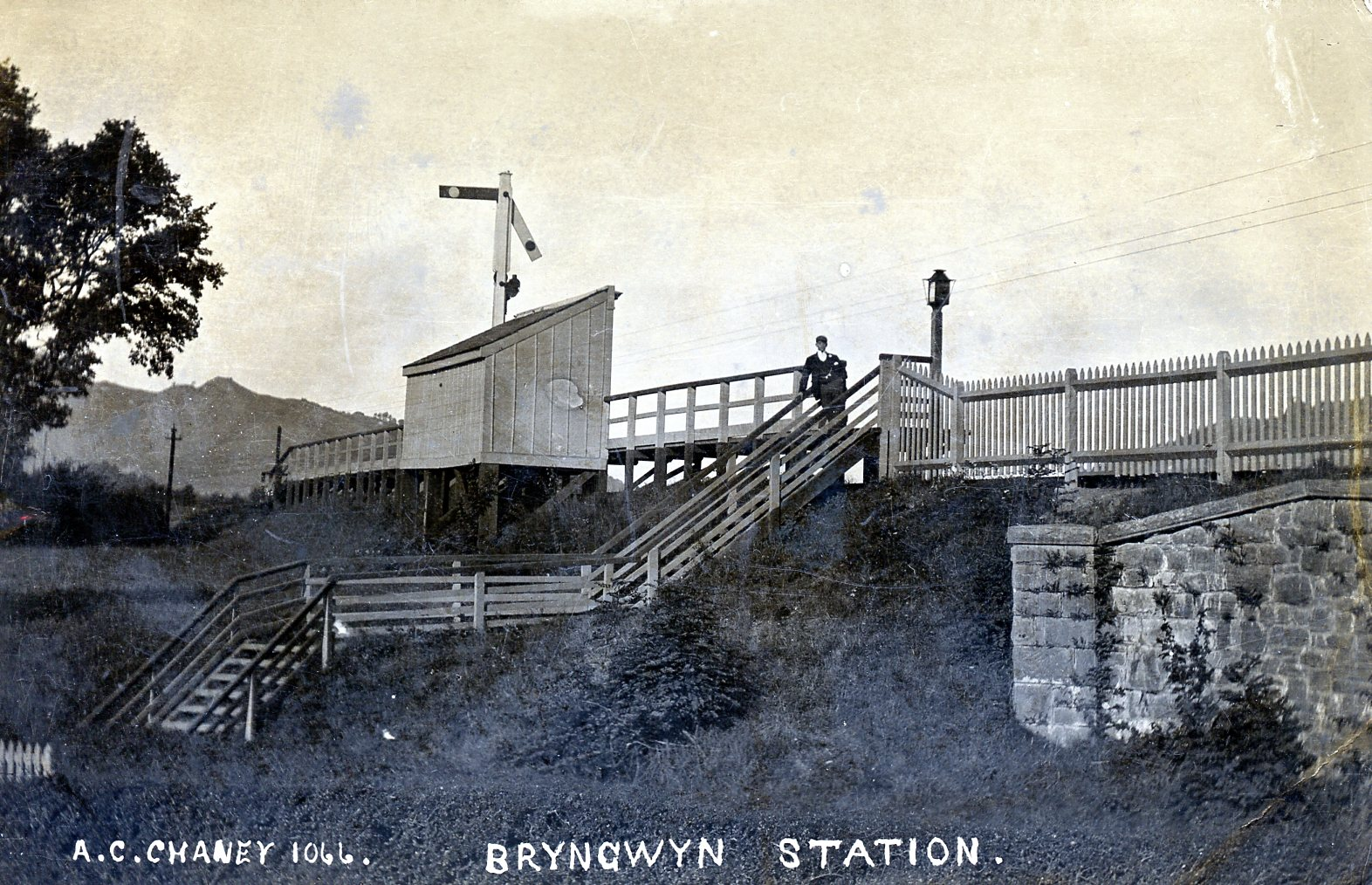

General information
- Location: Bwlch-y-cibau, Powys; Wales
- Coordinates: 52.7591°N 3.2277°W
- Grid reference: SJ172186
- Platforms: 1

Other information
- Status: Disused

History
- Original company: Cambrian Railways
- Pre-grouping: Cambrian Railways
- Post-grouping: Great Western Railway

Key dates
- 17 July 1863: Opened as Brongwyn
- ?: Renamed Bryngwyn
- 1923: Renamed Bryngwyn Halt
- 18 January 1965: Station closed
Location

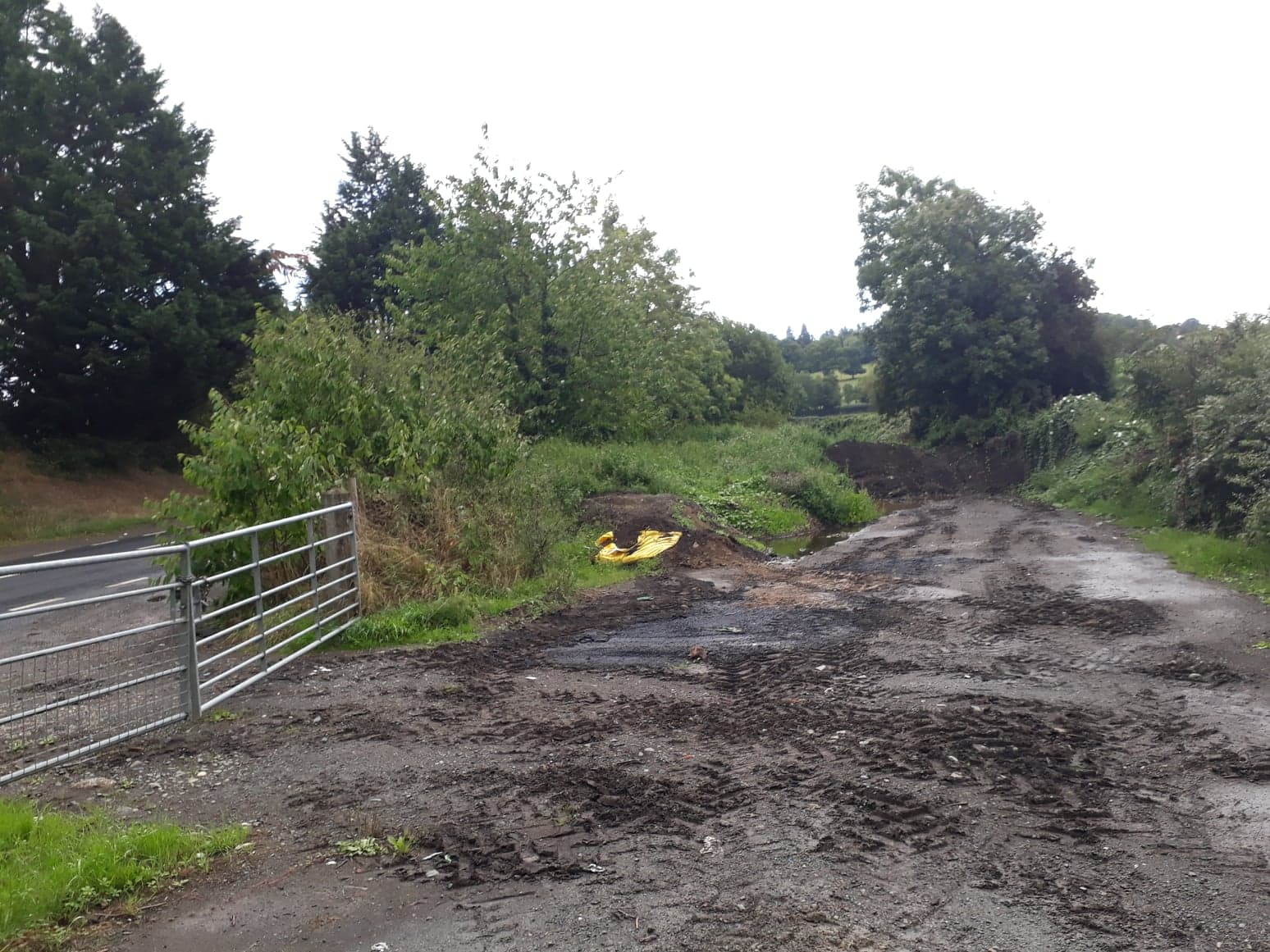
Bryngwyn Halt site in 2018

Bryngwyn Halt railway station is a disused station that was on the Llanfyllin Branch of the Cambrian Railways. It served the villages of Bwlch-y-cibau and Brynderwen between 1863 and 1965.

== History ==
The Llanfyllin Branch of the Cambrian Railways opened on 17 July 1863. The station was originally named Brongwyn; it was later renamed Bryngwyn. It was 6 3/4 miles (10.9 km) from Llanymynech, and took its name from Bryngwyn Hall. In 1866, there was one train on Tuesdays and one on Wednesdays. Originally provided with a wooden shelter, this was later replaced by one of corrugated iron. The platform was situated on an embankment on the west side of the Llanfechain road over bridge with step access to the road.

In 1923, the Great Western Railway renamed the station Bryngwyn Halt. It was closed by British Railways on 18 January 1965. No trace remains today.

Preceding station	Disused railways	Following station
Llanfyllin; Line and station closed	Cambrian Railways; Llanfyllin Branch	Llanfechain; Line and station closed
