= Llanfechain railway station =

Former railway station in Wales

Llanfechain
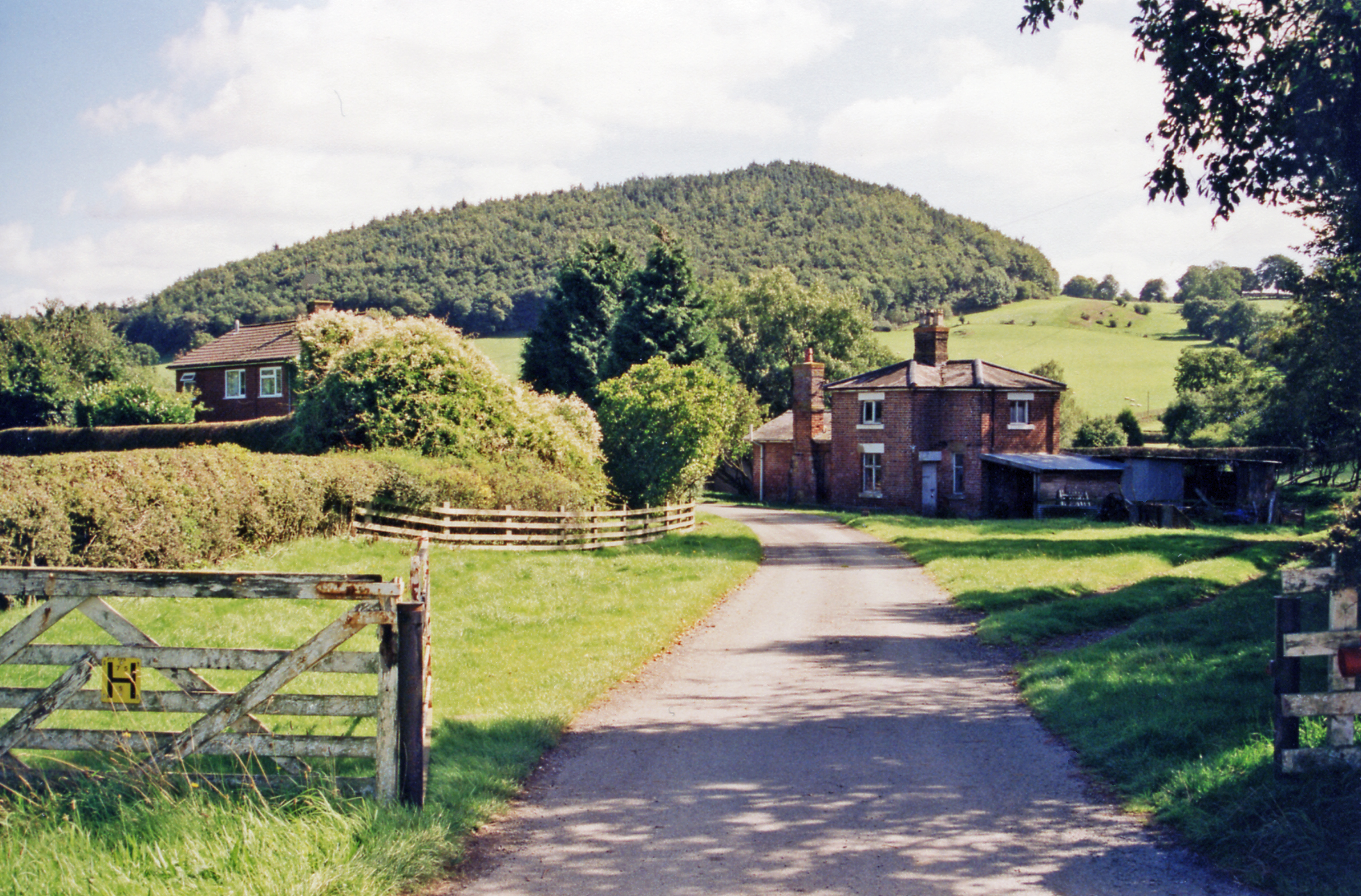
- Station remains in 1999

General information
- Location: Llanfechain, Powys; Wales
- Coordinates: 52.7750°N 3.1922°W
- Grid reference: SJ195204
- Platforms: 1

Other information
- Status: Disused

History
- Original company: Oswestry and Newtown Railway
- Pre-grouping: Cambrian Railways
- Post-grouping: Great Western Railway

Key dates
- 1865: Opened
- 1965: Closed
Location

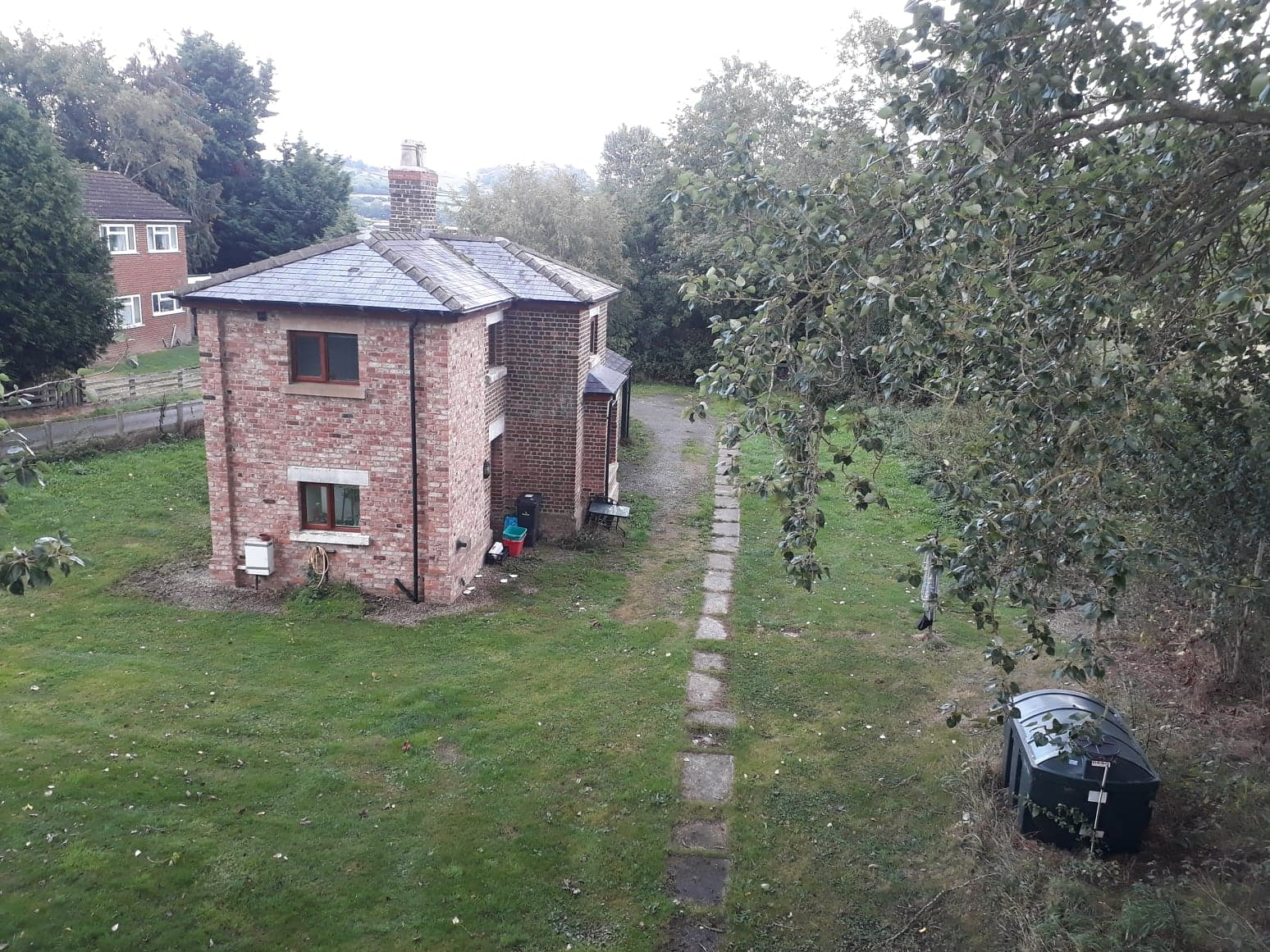
Llanfechain station in 2018

Llanfechain railway station is a former station in Llanfechain, Powys, Wales. The station opened in 1865 and closed in 1965. The station site is now a private residence and the trackbed filled in to platform level.

Preceding station	Disused railways	Following station
Bryngwyn Halt; Line and station closed	Cambrian Railways; Llanfyllin Branch	Llansantffraid; Line and station closed
