= Samaraweera =

Samaraweera is a surname of Sinhalese origin and primarily used in Sri Lanka, but is also used in southern India and Maldives. It may refer to:

- Dulip Samaraweera, Sri Lankan former international cricketer
- Mangala Samaraweera, Sri Lankan politician and former cabinet minister
- Rama Samaraweera, British-Sri Lankan wildlife artist
- Ravindra Samaraweera, a Sri Lankan politician
- S. A. Jayantha Samaraweera, a Sri Lankan politician
- Thilan Samaraweera, Sri Lankan international cricketer
