= Llansantffraid railway station =

Former railway station in Wales

Llansantffraid
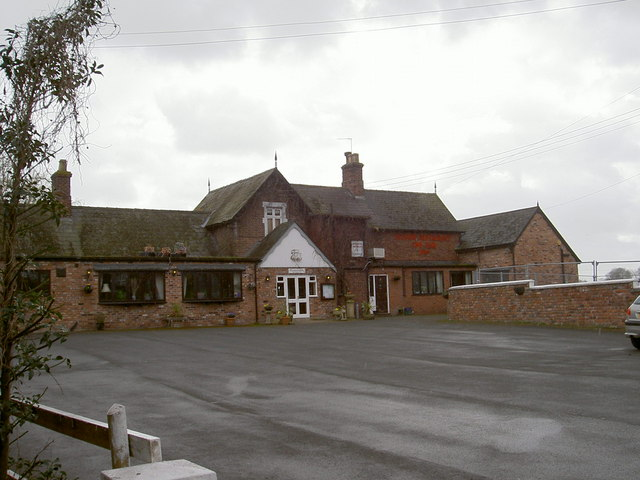
- The former station, now a restaurant

General information
- Location: Llansantffraid-ym-Mechain, Powys; Wales
- Coordinates: 52.7743°N 3.1521°W
- Grid reference: SJ222202
- Platforms: 1

Other information
- Status: Disused

History
- Original company: Oswestry and Newtown Railway
- Pre-grouping: Cambrian Railways
- Post-grouping: Great Western Railway

Key dates
- 1863: Opened
- 1965: Closed
Location

Llansantffraid railway station is a former station in Llansantffraid-ym-Mechain, Powys, Wales. The station opened in 1863 and closed in 1965. The station's two signal boxes, built by Dutton & Co., were moved to Oswestry and Shrewsbury.

When the railway arrived in the village in 1862, the station was called 'Llansaintffraid'. In 1922, when the Cambrian Railways amalgamated with the Great Western Railway, the station name changed to Llansantffraid.

== Present day ==
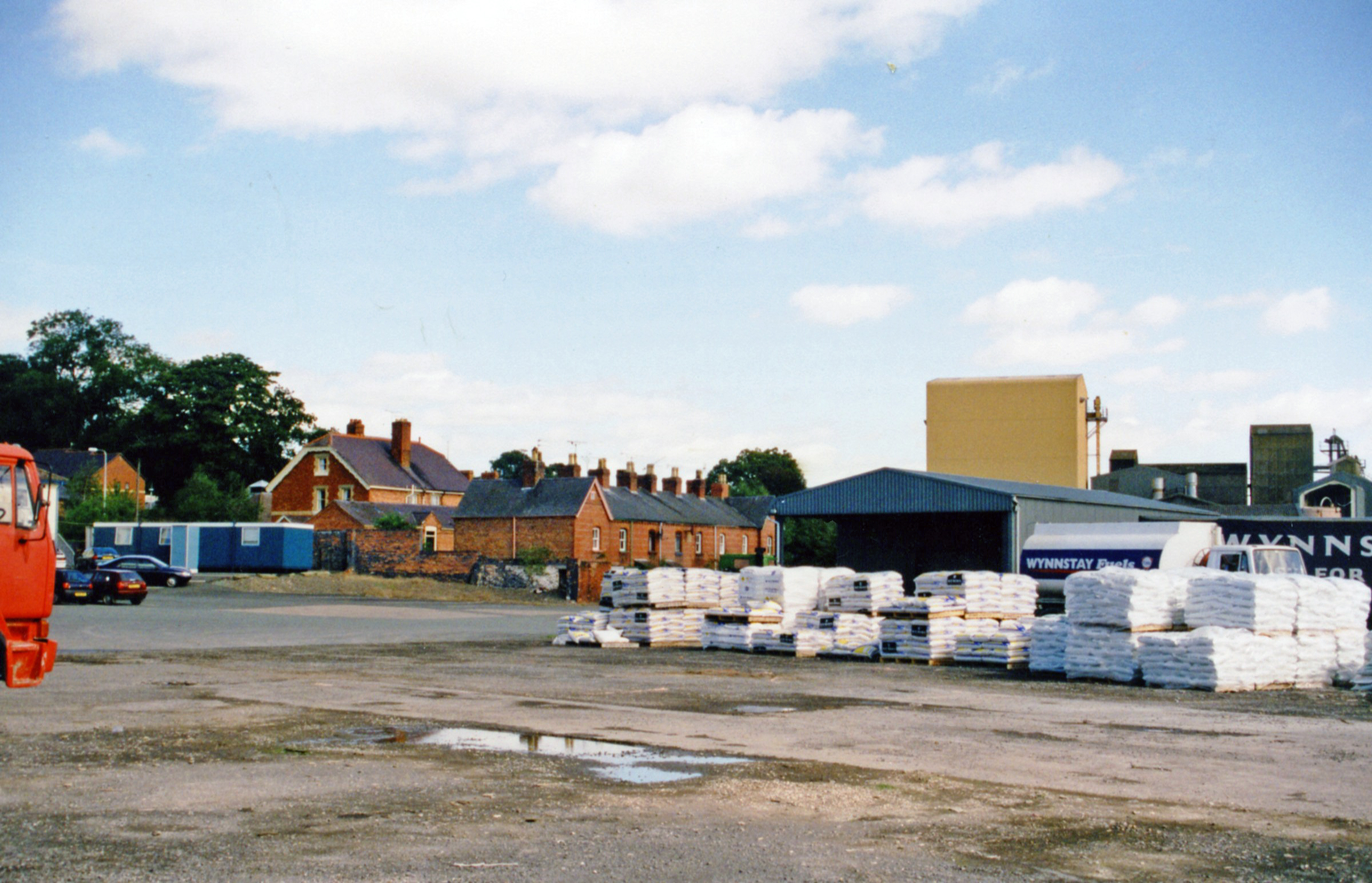
Former site in 1999

Much of the station site is still intact, with the platform retained as a conservatory onto the former trackbed, which has been converted into a children's play area. The station building is now a restaurant.

In 2025, the farm supplies company Wynnstay renovated the site, which is next to its headquarters, as a country store for farmers, gardeners and pet owners, with a Spar grocery on site too.

Preceding station	Disused railways	Following station
Llanfechain; Line and station closed	Cambrian Railways; Llanfyllin Branch	Carreghofa Halt; Line and station closed
