= Tomen yr Allt =

Motte and bailey castle near Llanfyllin in Powys, Wales

- Tomen yr Allt within Wales
- 52°46′49.33″N 3°17′45.71″W
- Type: Motte and Bailey Castle
- Periods: Medieval
- Satellite of: Cantref of Mechain
- Associated with: Lords of commote of Mechain Uwch Coed
- Location: Near Llanfyllin
- Region: Powys, Wales
- Part of: Kingdom of Powys until 1160, then Principality of Powys Wenwynwyn.

History
- Built: Possibly 10th century
- Abandoned: 1257 (keep destroyed)
- Event: Put under siege by Llywelyn ap Gruffudd in 1257

Site notes
- Material: Earthwork and timber
- Length: 40 m (130 ft)
- Width: 40 m (130 ft)
- Excavation dates: 1978
- Archaeologists: Clwyd-Powys Archaeological Trust
- Condition: Ruin - only earthworks remaining and very overgrown

Designations
- Designation: Cadw scheduled monument

Tomen yr Allt (or Domen yr Allt) was a Medieval motte and bailey defensive castle near Llanfyllin in Powys, Wales. "Tomen ar hallt" is modern Welsh for "mound on the wooded hillside."

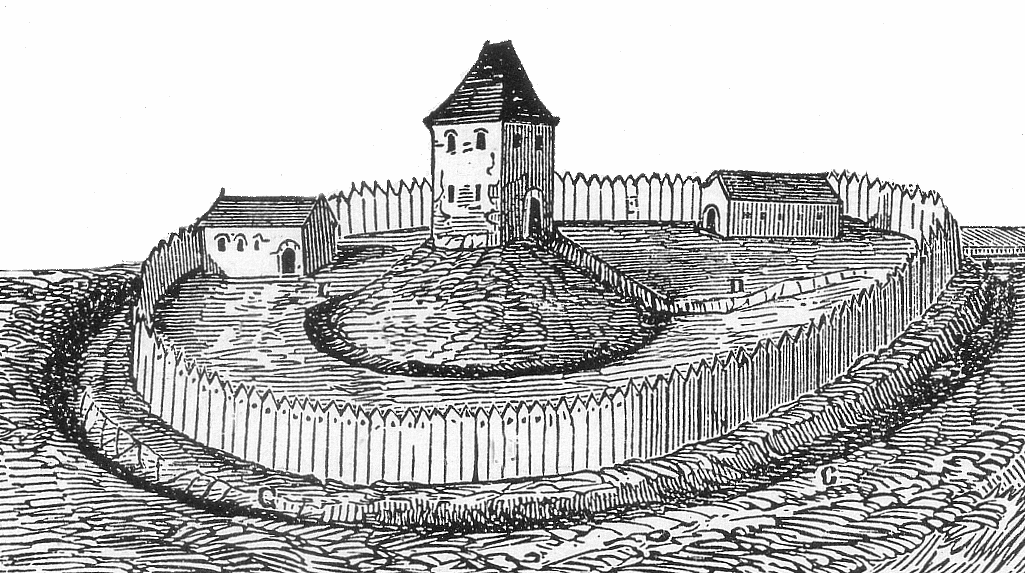
Motte and Bailey castle

== Description ==
The site is over 40 m (130 ft) in diameter; the central man-made earthwork mound (motte) is about 13 by 10 m (43 by 33 ft) and nearly 10 m (33 ft) high. There is a continuous stony ditch, which is doubled on the north-east side, away from the natural slope of the hill. The bank is flattened where it joins fields on the south-east side and no bailey is apparent in that section. Most of the earthworks remain and the keep of the castle was probably timber, as CPAT (Clwyd-Powys Archaeological Trust) found a piece of daub and the remains of a burnt layer in 1978. The site is a Cadw scheduled monument.

== History ==
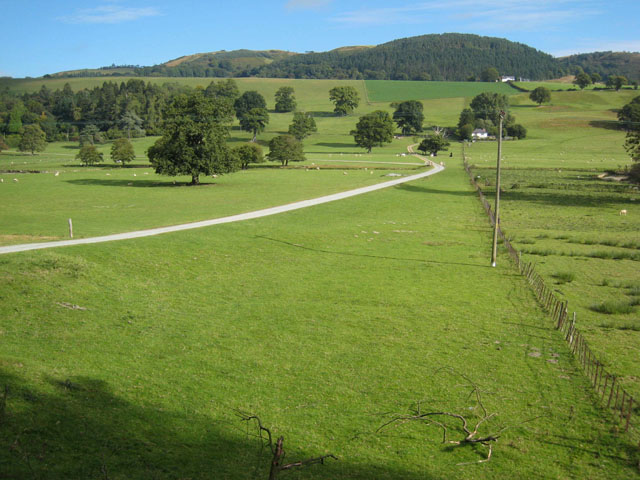
View from Bodfach Hall towards Tomen yr Allt (peak one third of the way across the skyline from the left)

Tomen yr Allt was the caput of the commote of Mechain Uwch Coed in the cantref of Mechain.

In 1160, when the Kingdom of Powys was divided, Mechain became part of the principality which later came to be known as Powys Wenwynwyn. By 1208, the region was controlled by Llywelyn the Great. After his death in 1241, his heir had to come to terms with Henry III of England, which resulted in Powys Wenwynwyn passing to the rule of Gruffydd ap Gwenwynwyn who was allied to Henry III.

Llywelyn ap Gruffudd, the grandson of Llywelyn the Great and the Prince of Gwynedd, began to expand his territory after 1255. In May 1257, Llywelyn ap Gruffudd was reported to have put the "castle of Bodyddon" under siege (Tomen yr Allt is less than 1 km east of Bodyddon and overlooks it). The intention was likely to bring the lords of Mechain to submission, and by 1258 they were indeed allied to Llywelyn. Presumably Tomen yr Allt is the "castle of Bodyddon" to which the reports refer, which was destroyed in 1257.

The site overlooks Bodfach Hall approximately 1 km south-east in the hamlet of Bodfach near Llanfyllin. Tomen yr Allt and the wooded area around it, known as Coed yr Allt, is on land which belonged to the historical estate of the hall. The original building on the site of the hall may have been constructed to replace the castle.
