= Bodfach =

Coordinates: 52.769372°N 3.289472°W

- Location within Powys
- OS grid reference: SJ 1310 1987
  - Cardiff: 89 mi (143 km)
  - London: 160 mi (260 km)
- Community: Llanfyllin
- Principal area: Powys
- Country: Wales
- Sovereign state: United Kingdom
- Post town: LLANFYLLIN
- Postcode district: SY22
- Police: Dyfed-Powys
- Fire: Mid and West Wales
- Ambulance: Welsh
- UK Parliament: Montgomeryshire and Glyndŵr
- Senedd Cymru – Welsh Parliament: Montgomeryshire

Bodfach is a hamlet in the community of Llanfyllin, Powys, Wales.

Nearby Bodfach Estate goes back to 1160 when by Einion Efell inherited the land from his father Madog ap Maredudd, Prince of Powys, following the destruction of the Tomen yr Allt motte and bailey castle which stood on the hill above Bodfach. The Woodland Trust, in partnership with the owners, have planted many new trees as part of a project to restore the character of this ancient royal landscape.

The annual 'Llanfyllin Show' is held at Bodfach.

== See also ==
- List of localities in Wales by population
