= Susannah Jane Rankin =

Welsh missionary (1897–1989)

- Born: Susannah Jane Ellis; 26 November 1897 near Llanfyllin, Montgomeryshire
- Died: 24 July 1989 (aged 91); Australia
- Occupations: Missionary, translator, educator, college administrator
- Spouse: Robert Rankin

Susannah Jane Rankin MBE (26 November 1897 – 24 July 1989, née Ellis) was a Welsh Congregational minister, religious educator, linguist and translator. She spent time as a missionary in Papua New Guinea. She translated works from Welsh and English to the Motu language.

== Early life and education ==
Susannah Jane Ellis was born at Pengorffwysfa farm, near Llanfyllin, Montgomeryshire, the daughter of Frank Ellis and Jane Ellis. In 1922, she was the first woman at the University of Wales to earn a Bachelor of Divinity, having studied at Bala-Bangor Theological Seminary. She was ordained in 1925 at Pendref, Llanfyllin.

== Career ==
After serving as a lecturer at Lawes Theological College in Fife Bay. In 1927, Rankin became an evangelist, posted to Port Moresby, Papua New Guinea. In 1928, she went to Kalaigoro to improve the mission work there. In 1930, she moved to Saroa to unite the coastal and inland missions. She taught English and studied the Motu language, and other local languages. She married her husband Robert Rankin, a fellow missionary, in Moru in 1932. They both returned to the mission station she had established at Saroa and where she would be involved in setting up primary schools. They would leave Saro and PNG in 1956 for a year's leave before returning to Veiru.

She and her husband, were appointed Professor and Principal at Chalmers Memorial Theological College after its establishment in 1957. Her husband died three years later, and she took over the role of Principal until 1964. After retiring in 1965, she returned to Moru and mission work. For her translation work from Welsh and English to the Motu language, Rankin received an Honorary M.A. degree from the University of Wales.

== Personal life ==
Susannah Ellis married Robert Rankin in 1932. Robert Rankin died in 1960, during a leave in Australia. Rankin died in Australia in 1989, aged 91 years.
