= River Cain =

River in north Powys, Wales

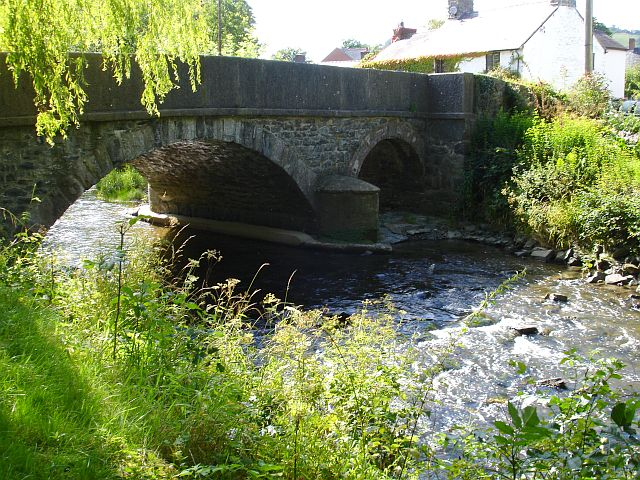
- Llanfechain Bridge over Afon Cain

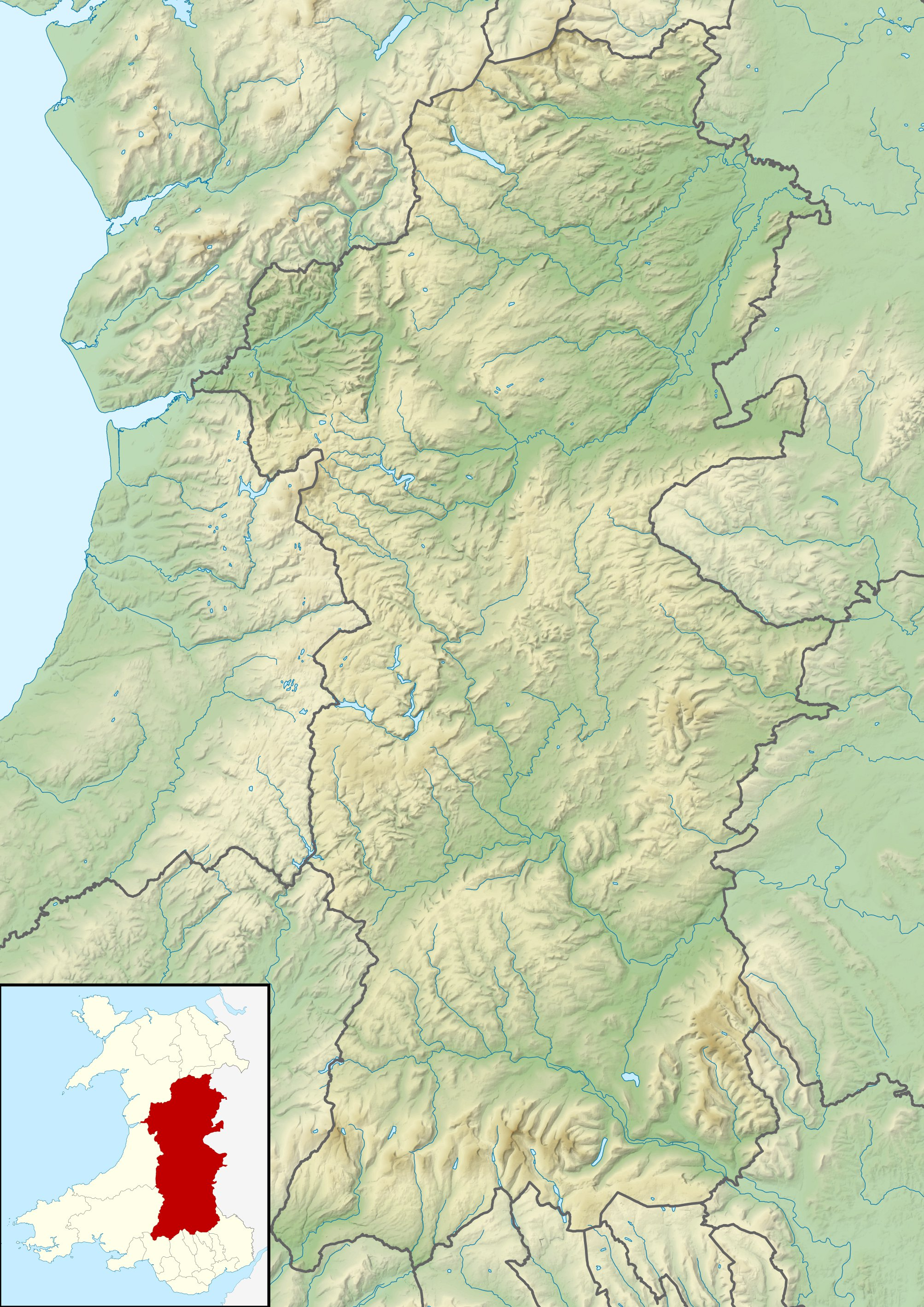
- Location of the mouth within Powys
- Native name: Afon Cain (Welsh)

Location
- Country: Wales
- Counties: Powys

Physical characteristics
- Source: Confluence of Nant Alan and Nant Fyllon
  - coordinates: 52.7706°N 3.2837°W
- Mouth
  - location: River Vyrnwy
  - coordinates: 52.774°N 3.147°W
- Length: 16 km (9.9 mi)

Basin features
- Tributaries
  - left: Nant Fyllon, River Abel, Nant Llys
  - right: Nant Alan, The Brogan

The River Cain (Welsh: Afon Cain) is a river in north Powys which flows into the River Vyrnwy.

Cain's source is just west of Llanfyllin, at the confluence of the Nant Alan and Nant Fyllon.

After flowing east through Llanfyllin, where it is joined by the small River Abel, it continues eastwards alongside the A490 highway. It then turns north-east to pass through Llanfechain and is joined by the Nant Llys before finally flowing east again. It is fed by the Brogan, before joining the Vyrnwy near Llansantffraid-ym-Mechain.

The Cain is 16 km long.

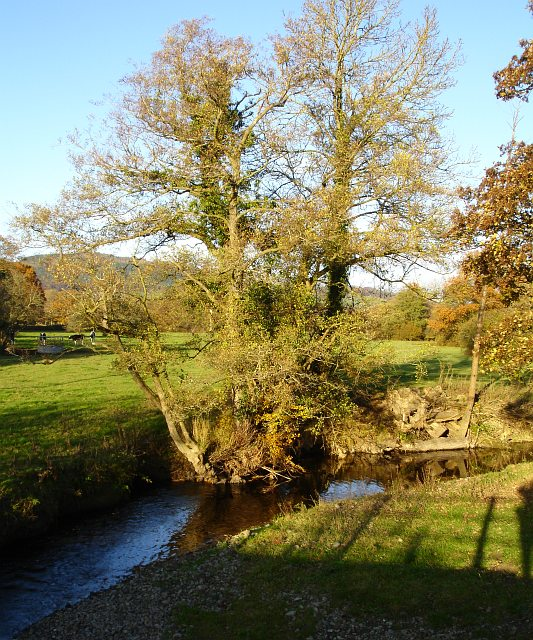
Afon Cain south of Llanfechain

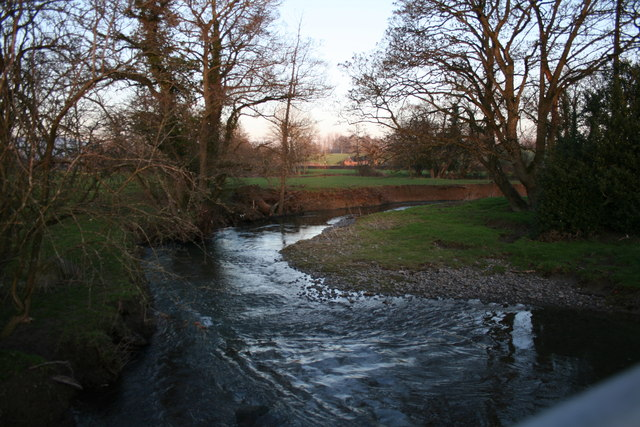
Afon Cain between Llanfyllin and Llanfechain
