= Llanfyllin railway station =

Former railway station in Wales

Llanfyllin
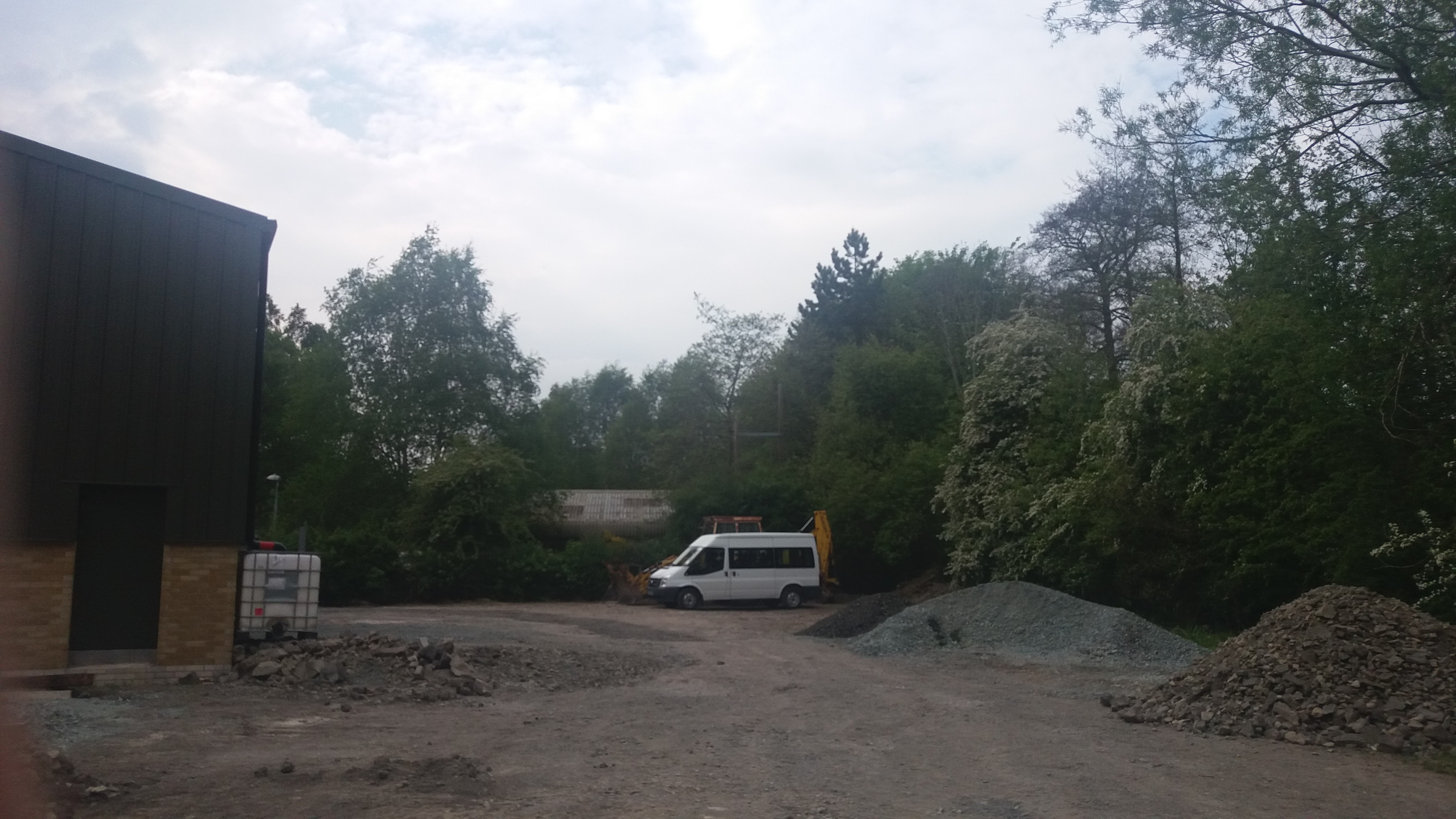
- Site of Llanfyllin station in 2017

General information
- Location: Llanfyllin, Powys; Wales
- Coordinates: 52.7639°N 3.2665°W
- Grid reference: SJ145192
- Platforms: 1

Other information
- Status: Disused

History
- Original company: Oswestry and Newtown Railway
- Pre-grouping: Cambrian Railways
- Post-grouping: Great Western Railway

Key dates
- 1863: Opened
- 1965: Closed
Location

Llanfyllin railway station is the former terminal station of the Llanfyllin Branch of Cambrian Railways, which served the town of Llanfyllin in Powys, Wales.

The whole line opened from Llanymynech via Llansantffraid, Llanfechain and Bryngwyn in 1863, to enable access to the limestone quarries along the Llanfyllin valley. After leaving Llanymynech station, the LB crossed the Ellesmere Canal and travelled due west to Llanfyllin.

The former CR mainline from Oswestry to Welshpool closed in 1965, and so also the branchline to Llanfyllin, under British Railways' Beeching Axe. The goods shed and station survive, albeit as part of the industrial estate which now occupies the old station site. The street leading to it is still called Station Road.

Preceding station	Disused railways	Following station
Terminus	Cambrian Railways; Llanfyllin Branch	Bryngwyn Halt; Line and station closed
