= Bala–Bangor Theological Seminary =

Coordinates: 53.228°N 4.134°W

Bala–Bangor was a theological seminary belonging to the Welsh Independents (Undeb yr Annibynwyr Cymraeg), an association of Welsh congregationalists. It was founded in 1841 at Llanuwchllyn, then moved to a permanent location at Bala, Gwynedd in 1842 under the principalship of Michael Jones (1787–1853), who was followed by his son Michael D. Jones (1822–1898).

During Michael D. Jones's principalship, a row broke out between two rival factions within Welsh congregationalism over the seminary's constitution – Michael D. Jones and his followers wanted to keep and adhere to the old constitution but Rev. John Thomas of Liverpool and his followers wanted to impose a new constitution upon the seminary. Michael D. Jones's argument was that Rev. John Thomas's plan would only lead to the presbyterizing of the seminary and of the Congregational churches in general. This row lead to a split and for a period the Congregationalists had two seminaries in Bala, Thomas Lewis's seminary at Plasyndre and Michael D. Jones's at Bodiwan. But by 1886 Thomas Lewis's seminary had moved to Bangor. Michael D. Jones retired in 1892 and this paved the way to unite the two seminaries once again and this time at Bangor thus explaining the seminary's eclectic name: "Bala-Bangor".

The seminary remained in Bangor until its closure in 1989 by which time it was under the principalship of R. Tudur Jones, the last in the distinguished line of Principals to serve the Congregational churches in Wales. The seminary was closed mainly because of lack of demand for two Congregational seminaries in Wales. The Memorial College (having moved from Brecon to Swansea and then to Aberystwyth) offered a more central location for a United College to serve the Congregational churches throughout Wales. Through the 1990s, the United College remained at Aberystwyth, until its closure – now Congregational training is based back in Bangor under the supervision of Rev. Euros Wyn Jones.

== Alumni ==
- Susannah Jane Rankin
