= Dudley Zoo =

- Interactive map of Dudley Zoo
- Date opened: 18 May 1937
- Location: Dudley, West Midlands, England
- Land area: 40 acre
- No. of animals: 1500+ (2017)
- No. of species: 200+ (2017)
- Major exhibits: Tigers, Chimpanzees, Lemur Wood
- Website: www.dudleyzoo.org.uk

Dudley Zoo & Castle (previously Dudley Zoological Gardens) is a 40-acre (16 ha) zoo within a 200-acre densely-wooded site located within the grounds of Dudley Castle in the town of Dudley, in the Black Country region of the West Midlands, England. The zoo opened to the public on 18 May 1937. It contains 12 modernist animal enclosures and other buildings designed by the architect Berthold Lubetkin and the Tecton Group. The zoo went into receivership in 1977 and was purchased by Dudley Metropolitan Borough Council. Dudley Zoo is now operated by Dudley and West Midlands Zoological Society, founded in 1978 and a registered charity.

== History ==
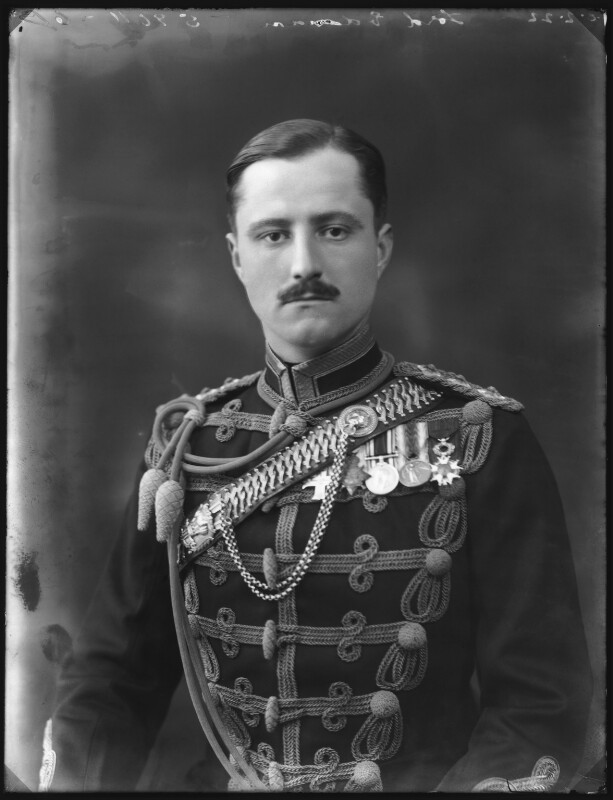
William Humble Eric Ward, the Third Earl of Dudley, created Dudley Zoo in the grounds of his ruined castle

A previous logo using the zoo's previous name.

The owner of Dudley Castle, William Ward, 3rd Earl of Dudley, decided to create a zoo in the castle grounds in the 1930s. The initial Board of the Dudley Zoological Society was made up of the Earl, Ernest Marsh (director of Marsh and Baxter) and Captain Frank Cooper, owner of Oxford Zoo, who wanted to sell his animals and it was Oxford Zoo, which closed in 1936, that supplied Dudley with the majority of its initial collection of animals. The zoo was built between 1935 and 1937, with Dr Geoffrey Vevers, the Superintendent at London Zoo acting as an advisor. Thirteen zoo buildings were designed by Berthold Lubetkin and engineering was carried out by Ove Arup. The steepness of much of the terrain and the presence of caverns produced by limestone mining in previous centuries presented the architects and builders with a number of difficulties. Further constraints were presented by the castle being a scheduled monument, its structure and immediate surroundings being protected by a government department, the Office of Works.

The architects chose a deliberately modern style for the animal enclosures, entrance and visitor refreshment facilities, making no attempt to match the appearance of the castle ruins. The main material chosen for the construction was pre-stressed reinforced concrete which gave the possibility of forming curved structures and projecting platforms. It was decided to avoid cages where possible and to display the animals in a deliberately artificial manner rather than create an imitation of natural surroundings.

The zoo opened on 18 May 1937. The opening day was a success, with over 250,000 people recorded as visiting the zoo on its opening day. 700,000 people visited the zoo in its first year.

The opening weeks of the zoo were not always positive as on 18 June 1937, a Malayan brown bear escaped from the zoo, biting a Dudley resident and was struck by a policeman's truncheon. The bear then spent a few hours in local gardens before recapture. Just 3 days later the animal made another escape, this time being shot dead in the castle grounds.

During his reign, King Edward VIII was a regular visitor to the zoo. The King was a close friend of the zoo's co-owner, William Ward, 3rd Earl of Dudley.

Elephant rides were one of the attractions of the zoo since it opened in 1937, as it was reported in April 1937 that two Indian elephants had been brought to Dudley Zoo with that purpose in mind. The zoo continued to have elephants until 9 April 2003 when the zoo’s last two African elephants, Flossie and Flora, were relocated to Planete Sauvage in south-west France.

A miniature railway was added in 1938 with two locomotives constructed by G & S Light Engineering, of Stourbridge. The locomotives ran on a track about 1 mile long, carrying up to 150 passengers.

In 1958 a chair lift was introduced to take visitors from near the entrance up the steep grass bank towards the elephant house. The chair lift was opened on 11 May 1958 by the comedian Richard Hearne. In 2000, the chairlift was put out of use due to safety concerns. It was relaunched in August 2012 following a Heritage Lottery Fund refurbish.

The zoo was bought by the Scotia leisure group in 1970. In 1977, the zoo went into receivership but was bought by Dudley Metropolitan Council. Finally, in 1978, The Dudley and West Midlands Zoological Society charity was set up to run the zoo, although the council still owns the grounds.

In 1979, the Penguin Pool had to be demolished because of damage to the concrete caused by the salty water. This was the one major original animal enclosure to unfortunately be lost.

On 23 October 2018 zoo staff shot dead an 8-year-old snow leopard named Margaash, after he had left his enclosure when a keeper failed to secure it. In a post to its website on 30 November 2018 the zoo confirmed that it was closed with no visitors on site at the time of the incident, and there is no suggestion that Margaash posed any immediate threat to any human. The zoo described the killing as "euthanasia". A backlash and protest followed as local people disagreed with the killing of Margaash, describing it as a "needless killing".

== Animals ==
A ring-tailed lemur at Dudley Zoo in 2026

Dudley Zoo was home to a gorilla named Bonzo from 1962 until his death in 1994. Due to his local fame and connection with the zoo's many visitors, a bust was erected of Bonzo in 2016.

In 2003, in common with other urban zoos, Dudley parted with their two female African elephants so that they could benefit from more spacious surroundings. The elephants were moved to West Midland Safari Park to benefit from a more spacious enclosure. The remaining large animals include giraffes, tigers, lions, reindeer, wallabies, and three snow leopards, the latest being born in May 2013. Primates are well represented, and there are several aviaries and a reptile house.

There was a time where Dudley Zoo housed polar bears and Southern elephant seals. Cuddles, a male orca, was housed at the zoo from 1971, until his death in February 1974. The dolphin and whale pools were modified seal and sea lions pools with the walls being built up to create more depth. However, these plans were in breach of the local planning laws and the zoo was ordered to return the pools to their original state. As the zoo was not prepared to invest in new purpose built pools Cuddles was put up for sale, but died before being moved, from long-term gastro-intestinal problems. The pools were returned to their original design and now house the zoo's sea lions.

== Modernist Architecture ==
One of the modernist structures at Dudley Zoo

The zoo buildings include twelve listed buildings, seven Grade II and five Grade II*, erected in 1937 by Berthold Lubetkin's Tecton Group which employed, among others, structural engineer Ove Arup. Most of the zoo buildings are in the International Style (architecture).

In 2011, the zoo announced refurbishment and renovation plans for the zoo's listed buildings and parts of the zoo itself; totalling £1.15 million. Initial funding for the project was met by the Heritage Lottery Fund.

In January 2013, newly released construction proposals indicated the entrance to the zoo would connect with the Black Country Museum and the Dudley Canal Trust, creating a single entrance for the three attractions. The new entrance was completed in September 2015. Focus will then shift to the bear pits, which zoo officials say will be renovated to provide "a dramatic backdrop in the landscape". This was the subject of an investigation by the Born Free Foundation in 2012.

In November 2018 a £6 million expansion of the zoo was announced, where tunnels running underneath the Castle Hill site from the Second World War could be brought back, so that visitors can glimpse the mining history of Dudley. The zoo's iconic 1930s Tecton buildings could also be refurbished with this £6 million expansion. The work began in 2020.

In February 2019 Dudley Zoo's Director, Derek Grove, announced plans to renovate animal enclosures and improve visitor facilities. These new renovations included; refurbishing the Lemur walk-through exhibit, adding a new indoor adventure playground, extending the Sumatran Tiger exhibit, and bringing back the European brown bears.

== Listed Lubetkin and Tecton Buildings at Dudley Zoo ==
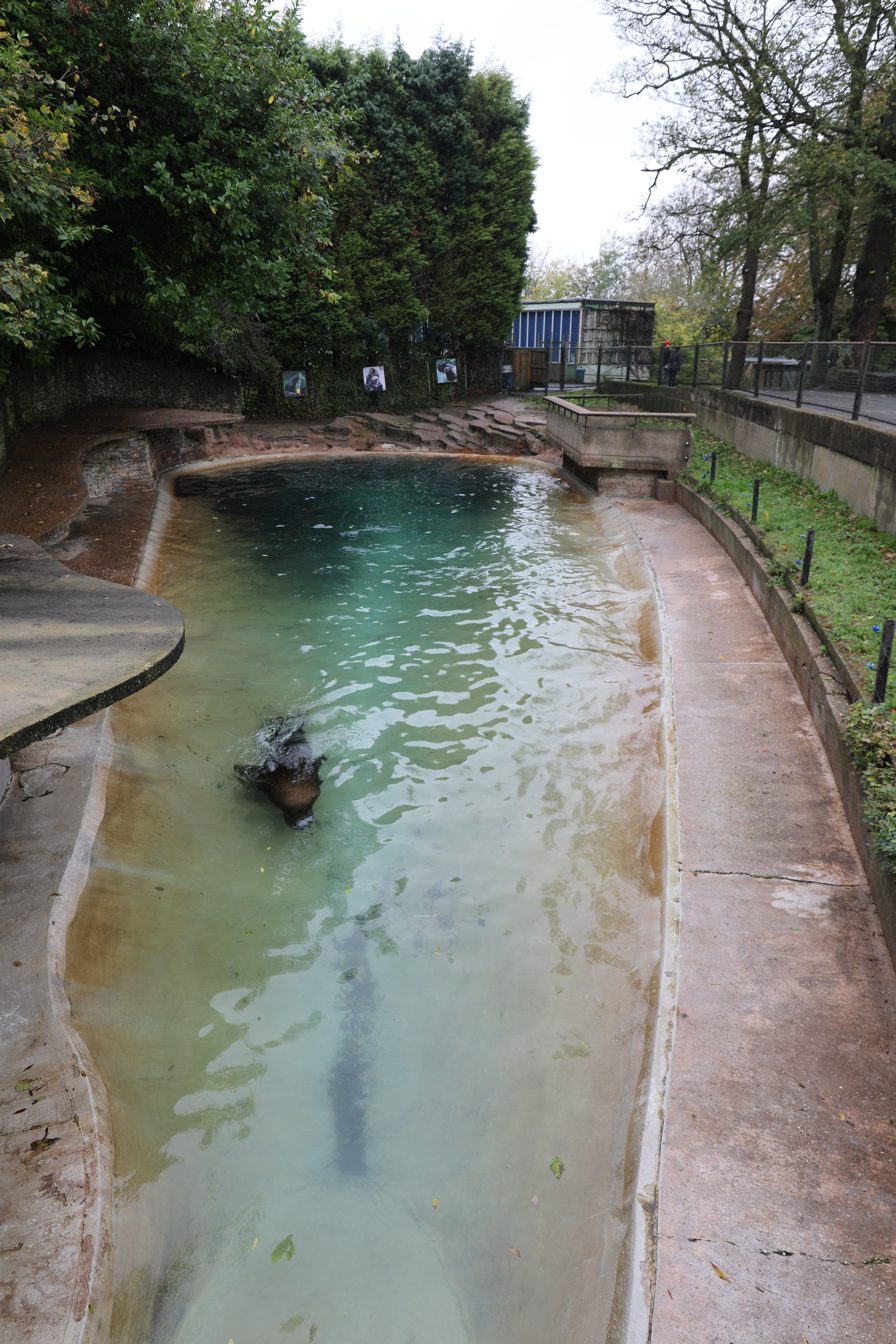
One of the sea lion pools at the zoo

- The Castle Restaurant
- The Elephant House
- The Entrance Gateway
- The Education Centre (formerly the Moat Café)
- Tropical Bird House
- Sea lion pools
- Brown bear ravine
- Kiosk south of the former brown bear pit
- Former Station Café, now the Safari Shop
- Polar Bear Pit and Lion and Tiger Ravines
- Kiosk east of the former brown bear pit
- The former reptiliary, now the Meerkat Enclosure

A further Tectron building, The Penguin Enclosure, was demolished in the 1960s.

== Artistic connections ==
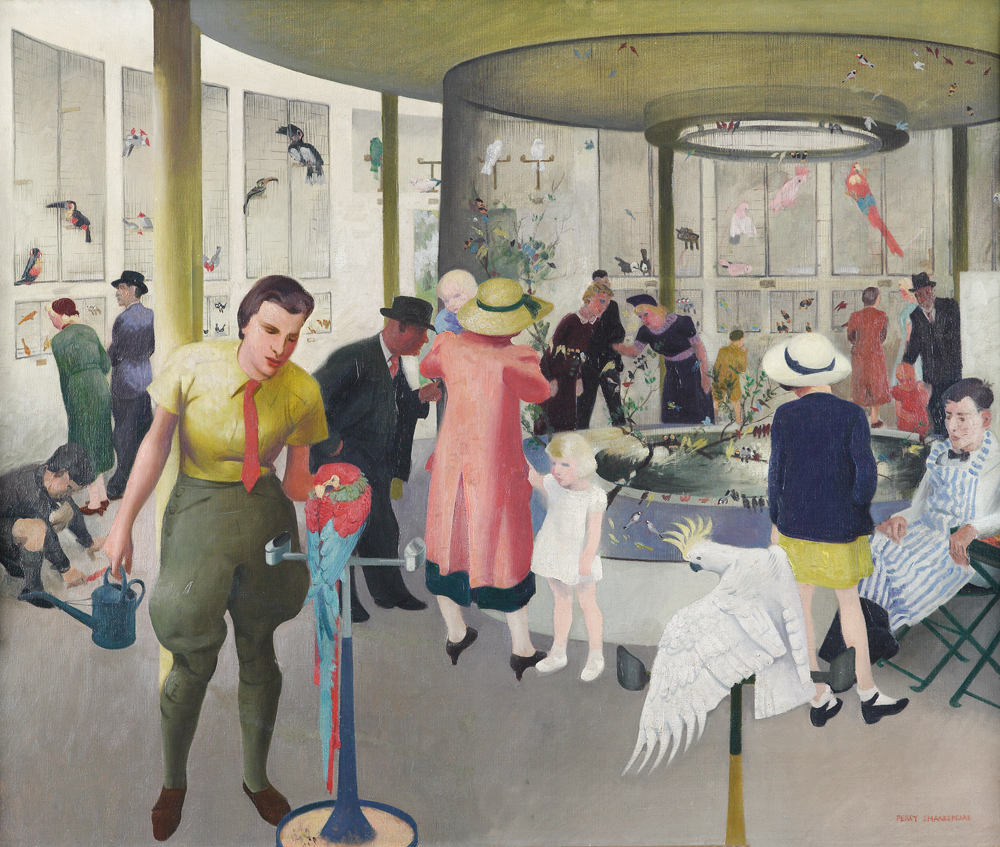
Tropical Bird House, Dudley Zoo (c. 1939, by Percy Shakespeare)

A painting by Percy Shakespeare, Tropical Bird House, Dudley Zoo (c.1939), is in Dudley Museum and Art Gallery.

In 2015, 89-year-old artist Rama Samaraweera, who was inspired to paint while a keeper at Dudley Zoo, donated three original oil paintings to the zoo to express his gratitude. His painting Clouded Leopard was a best-selling print in America in the 1970s. Animal Architecture (2015), a film by Adam Kossoff, narrated by Lenny Henry, explored the zoo and the restoration of Berthold Lubetkin's animal enclosures.

== Castle ==
Access to Dudley Castle, a Grade I listed building built in the 11th century, is included in the zoo entrance fee.

== Chairlift ==
A visitor chairlift was opened between the zoo's entrance and the castle on 11 May 1958 by Richard Hearne. It was taken out of use in 2000 due to health and safety concerns to the public.

In August 2012 the chairlift was reopened after a 12-week, £117,000 Heritage Lottery Fund restoration which included returning it to its original light cream colour.

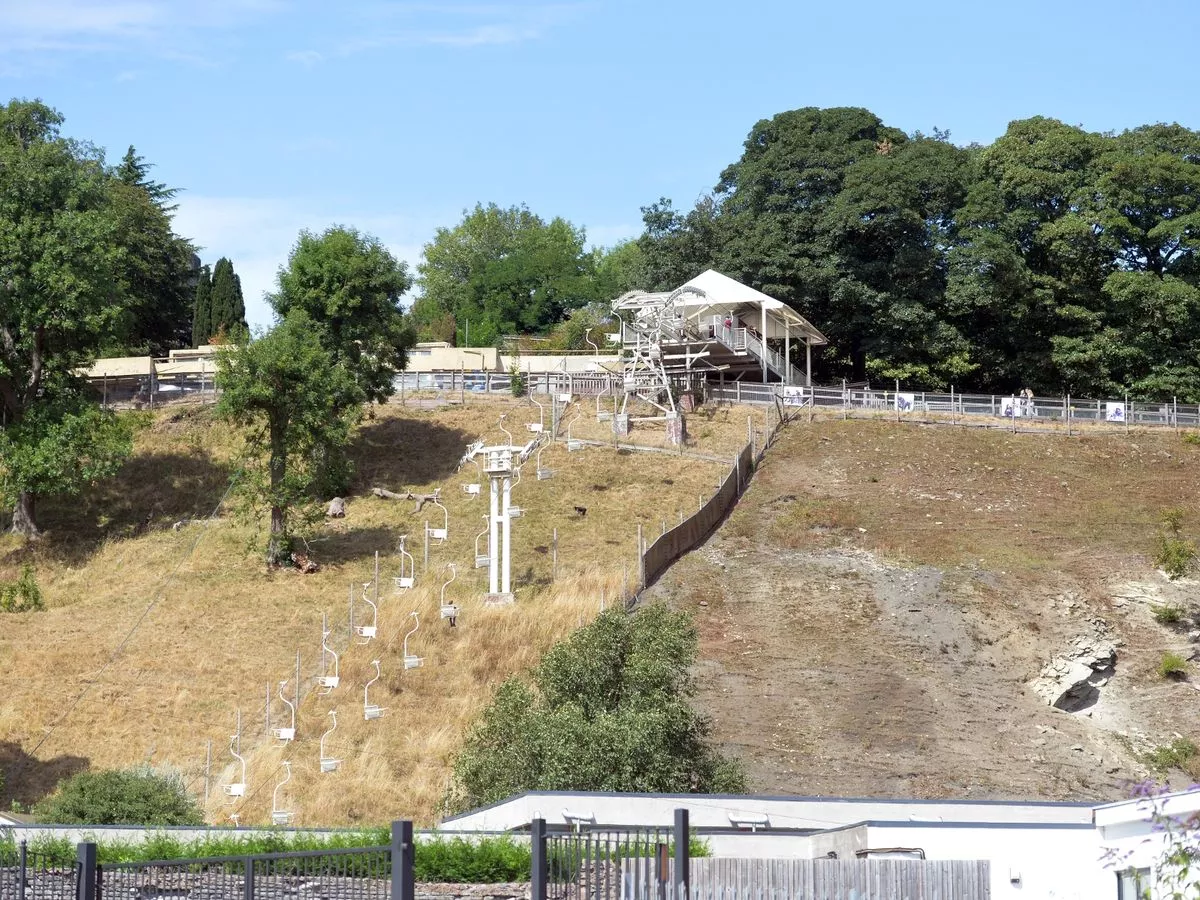
Chairlift at Dudley Zoo
