= Carreghofa Halt railway station =

Former railway station in Wales

Carreghofa Halt
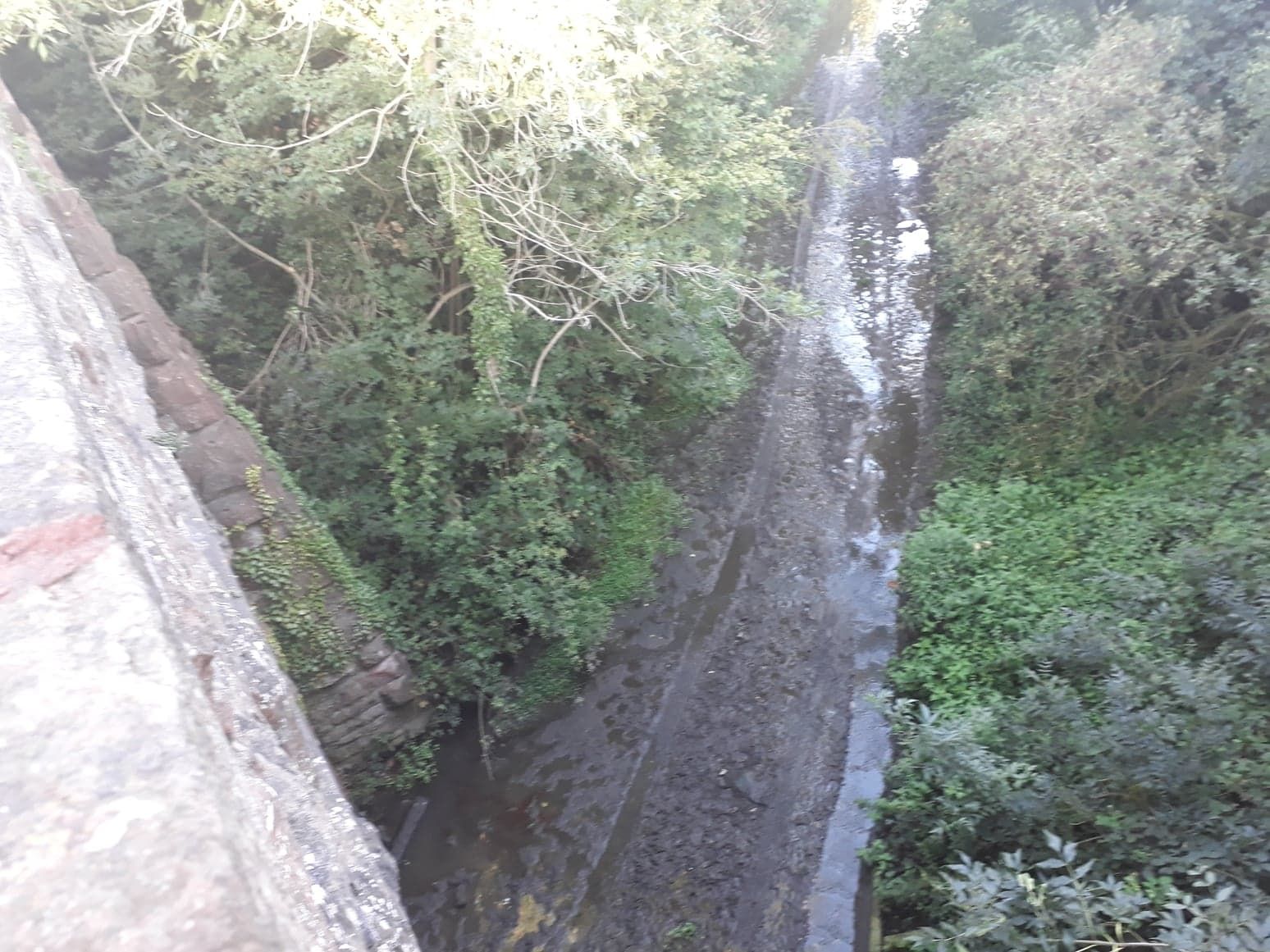

General information
- Location: Carreghofa, Powys; Wales
- Coordinates: 52.7783°N 3.0987°W
- Grid reference: SJ259206
- Platforms: 1

Other information
- Status: Disused

History
- Original company: Great Western Railway
- Post-grouping: Great Western Railway

Key dates
- 11 April 1938: Opened
- 18 January 1965: Closed
Location

Carreghofa Halt railway station is a disused station in Carreghofa, Powys, Wales. The station opened in 1938 and closed in 1965.

Preceding station	Disused railways	Following station
Blodwell Junction; Line and station closed	Great Western Railway; Nantmawr Branch	Llanymynech; Line and station closed
Llansantffraid; Line and station closed	Great Western Railway; Llanfyllin Branch	Llanymynech; Line and station closed
