= St Myllin's Well =

Well in Powys, Wales

Coordinates: 52°45′59″N 3°16′37″W

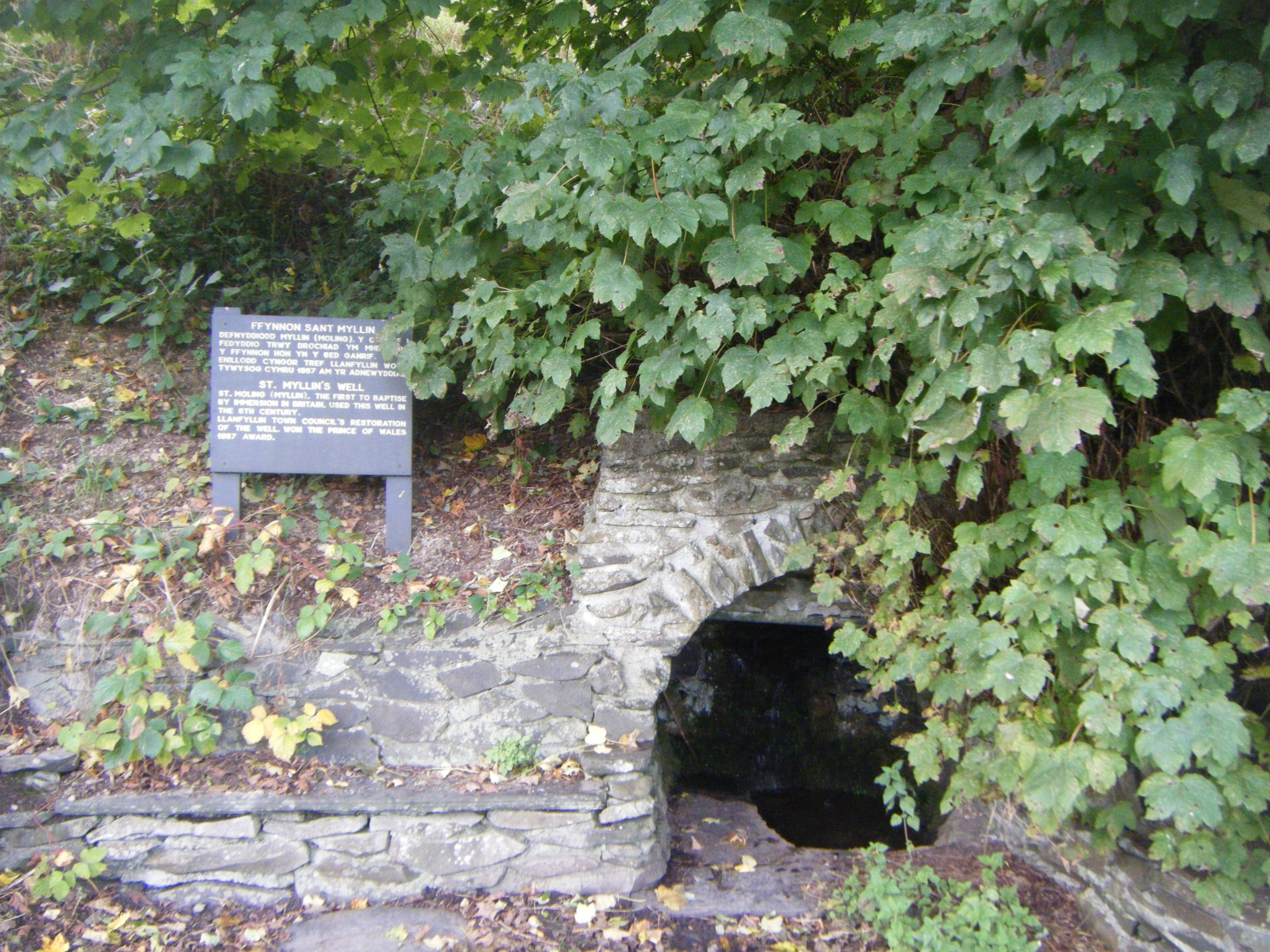
St Myllin's Well

St Myllin's Well, also known as Fynnon Coed y Llan (SJ1393819533), is a holy or sacred well located above the town of Llanfyllin in Powys, Wales.

Location of St Myllin's Well

== Description ==
This holy well was originally around 6 square feet or 0.558 square metres, however during restoration and its reconsecration in 1987 the well was reduced in size. The well site had become overgrown and the improvement works at the well and surroundings won the Prince of Wales Award that year. The water still flows from the well and runs into recently built small ponds.

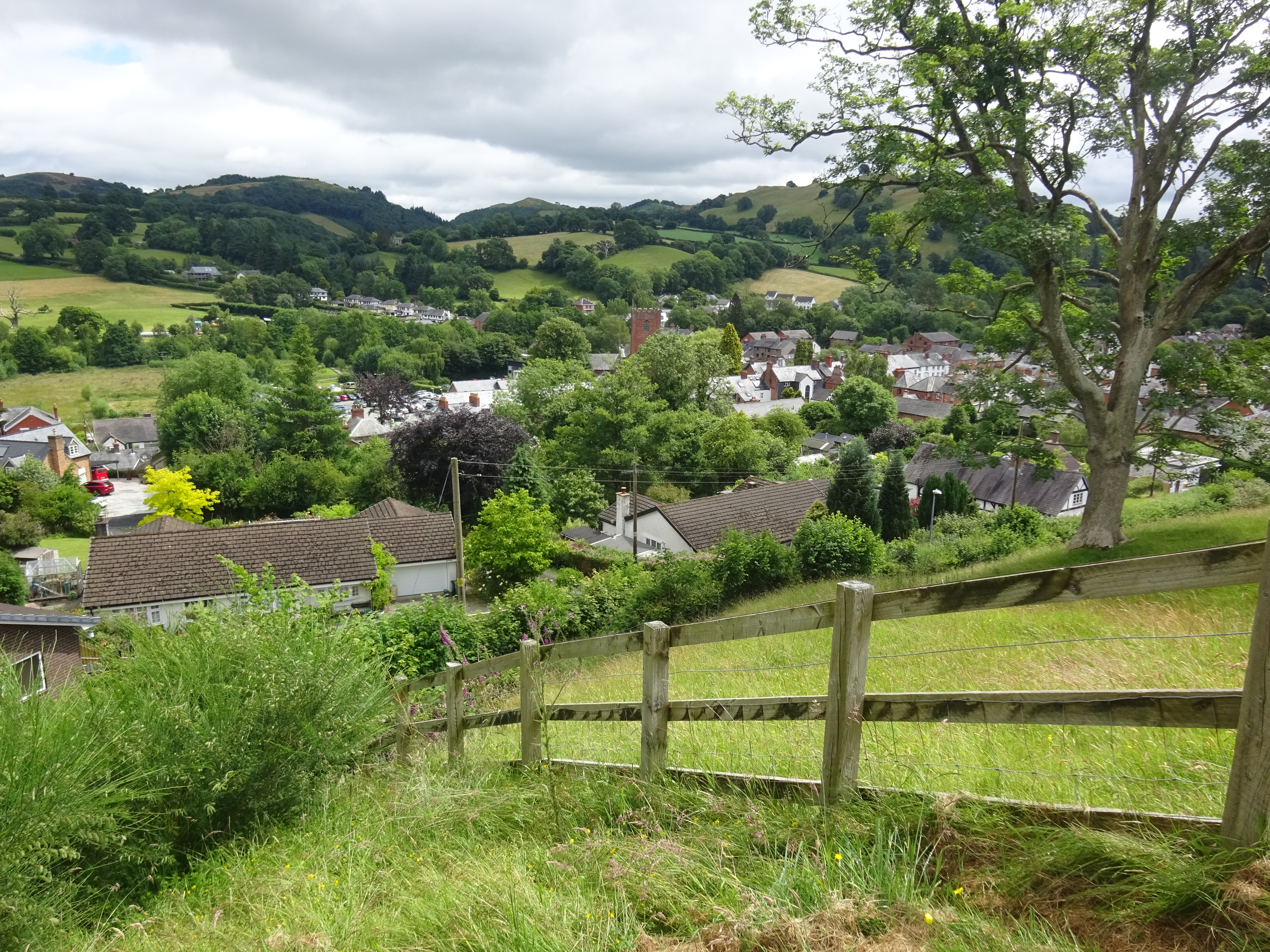
View of the town and church from St Myllin's Well.

== History ==
Myllin was a Celtic saint of the sixth or possibly seventh century, whose cell enclosure and wooden church were located at this hilly site and whose holy well can still be seen. Myllin is most likely to have been a local saint, with little influence beyond his immediate neighbourhood. The Fynnon Coed y Llan or Saint Myllin's Holy Well was also the parish well and the site where the saint is said to have been the first in Britain to baptise children and converted adult pagans by full body immersion. Myllin was for this reason known as 'Sant Mewn Llyn' or the 'Saint in the Lake' because of his being constantly in the water.

Llanfyllin's parish church in the town centre is dedicated to Saint Myllin. Another tradition, considered ill founded, is that Saint Myllin was an Irish bishop, named Moling Luachra (614–697), however no record of Moling Luachra travelling to Wales survives and it is thought therefore to be the local St Myllin hermit who was buried under the altar of Llanfyllin church as the bishop is said to have been buried at his monastery in Ireland.

=== St Myllin's Well and Local Traditions ===
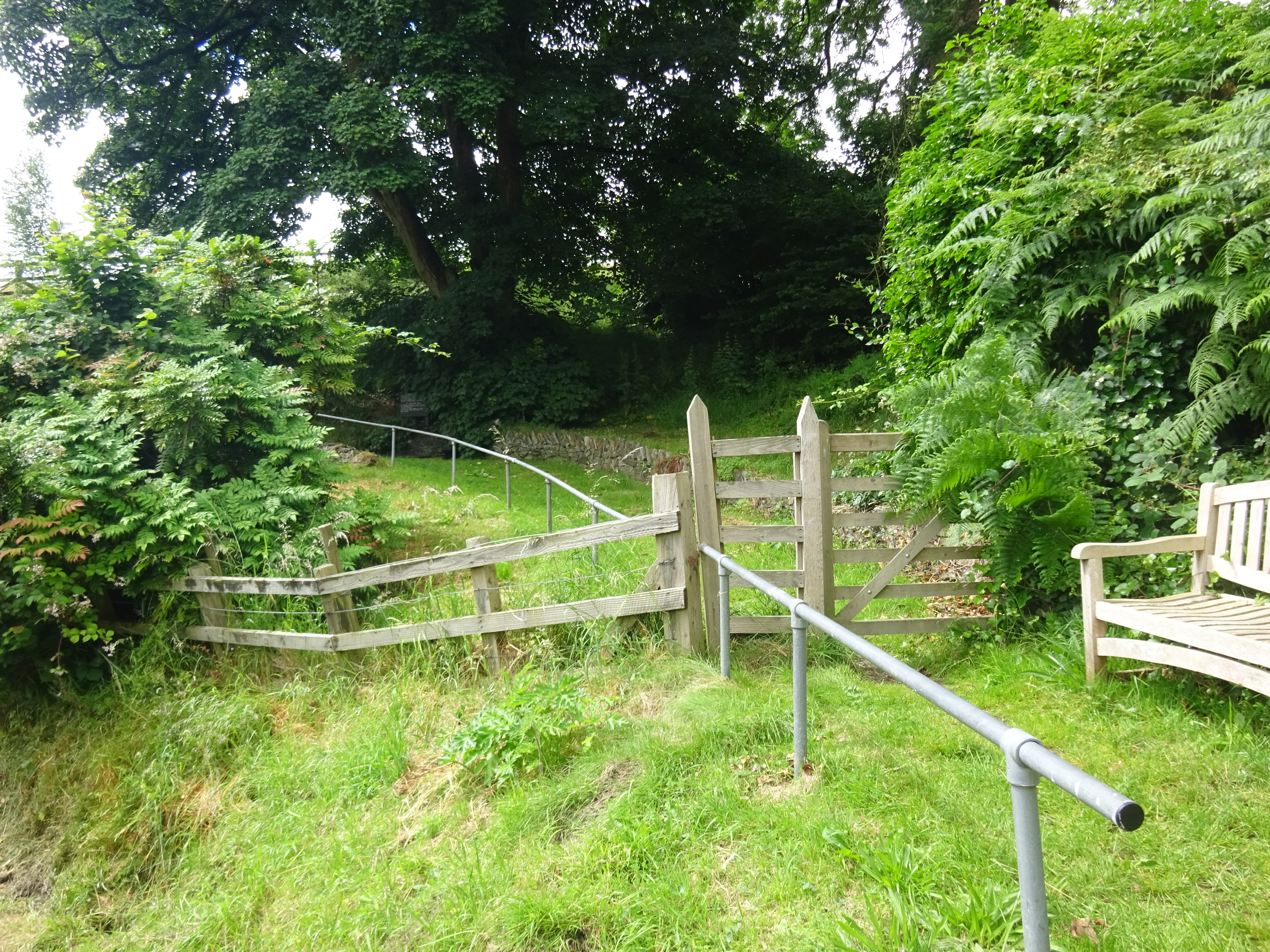
Access to the well site.

The Grade II listed St Myllin's well in Llanfyllin lies off Coed Llan Lane and below the Coed y Llan woodlands. As stated, it is dedicated to the saint who lived in the area in the 6th or 7th century who is said to have been a pioneer of baptism by total immersion.

People used to visit the well on Trinity Sunday to drink the well water sweetened with sugar and served by local maidens. Cakes and ale were served by the men in a tavern in the town. The sacred waters had healing properties and rags were dipped by visitors into the water and then hung on nearby bushes and trees. Fortunes could be told and wishes granted, both linked to the disintegration of the rags tied to the trees and bushes. A large sycamore tree grows at the site to this day.

== See also ==
- Llanfyllin
