= Rama Samaraweera =

English painter (1926–2021)

Rama "Sam" Samaraweera
- Born: 1926; Smethwick, England
- Died: 14 October 2021; Llanfyllin, Wales
- Known for: Painting

Rama "Sam" Samaraweera (1926 – 14 October 2021) was a British self-taught artist who lived and worked in Wales. He specialised in painting wildlife and was inspired by a year working as a keeper at Dudley Zoo. He is probably best known for his picture, "Clouded Leopard", a best-seller as a print.

== Early life ==
Samaraweera was born in 1926 in Smethwick. He drew animals as a child, encouraged by his father, a doctor from Ceylon (now Sri Lanka) who was a GP in Birmingham. He trained as a teacher and he and his wife Sue went to Jamaica where he lectured in art and English literature. After military service, in 1961 Samaraweera took a job at Dudley Zoo as a keeper. He was sacked after a year for spending too much time sketching the animals he was supposed to be looking after.

== Painter ==
The loss of the job provided the impetus to paint for a living. His Clouded Leopard became a best-selling print in America in the 1970s. During his painting career he exhibited at the Royal Academy, The Society of Wood Engravers, The Graphic Society, The Society of Wildlife Artists and The Pastel Society. He staged five one-man exhibitions, two in London. In 2015 he returned to Dudley Zoo to donate three oil paintings in gratitude for inspiring him to paint.

== Personal life ==
Samaraweera, a grandfather, lived in Llanfyllin, Powys, Wales, where he had a studio in which he painted every day. He celebrated his 90th birthday in 2016. His nephew, Phil Brooks, is Head of Photography at Dudley College. Samaraweera died on 14 October 2021 in Llanfyllin and was buried at Llanfyllin Cemetery on 8 November 2021.
