= Llanfyllin High School =

- Ysgol Uwchradd Llanfyllin

Location
- Llanfyllin, Powys; Wales
- Coordinates: 52.7638°N 3.2719°W

Information
- Type: Secondary School
- Closed: 2020
- Local authority: Powys County Council
- Head teacher: Dewi Owen
- Gender: Mixed
- Age: 11 to 18
- Enrolment: 824 (February 2016)
- Language: English / Welsh bilingual
- Website: www.llanfyllin-hs.powys.sch.uk

Llanfyllin High School (Welsh: Ysgol Uwchradd Llanfyllin) was a bilingual secondary school situated in the mid-Wales town of Llanfyllin. As of its final Estyn inspection in February 2016, it had 824 pupils, down from 1,001 in 2009.

Around one fifth of its pupils lived across the English border in Shropshire, and 18% spoke Welsh as a first language as of 2016. Only one pupil was learning English as a foreign language. The proportion of pupils with special educational needs was lower than the national average, and 6% qualified for free school meals, compared to a national average of 17.4%.

As a bilingual school, Llanfyllin High School had a Welsh language stream in which most subjects were taught in Welsh, and an English language stream in which most subjects were taught in English. Some courses were taught bilingually. A group of pupils in years 6 to 9 participated in a project named Trochi (Immersion) to increase their fluency in Welsh and allow them to transfer to the Welsh language stream.

The school closed in 2020, merging with Llanfyllin Community Primary School to form an all-through school, Ysgol Llanfyllin.
