= Llanfyllin =

Town in Powys, Wales

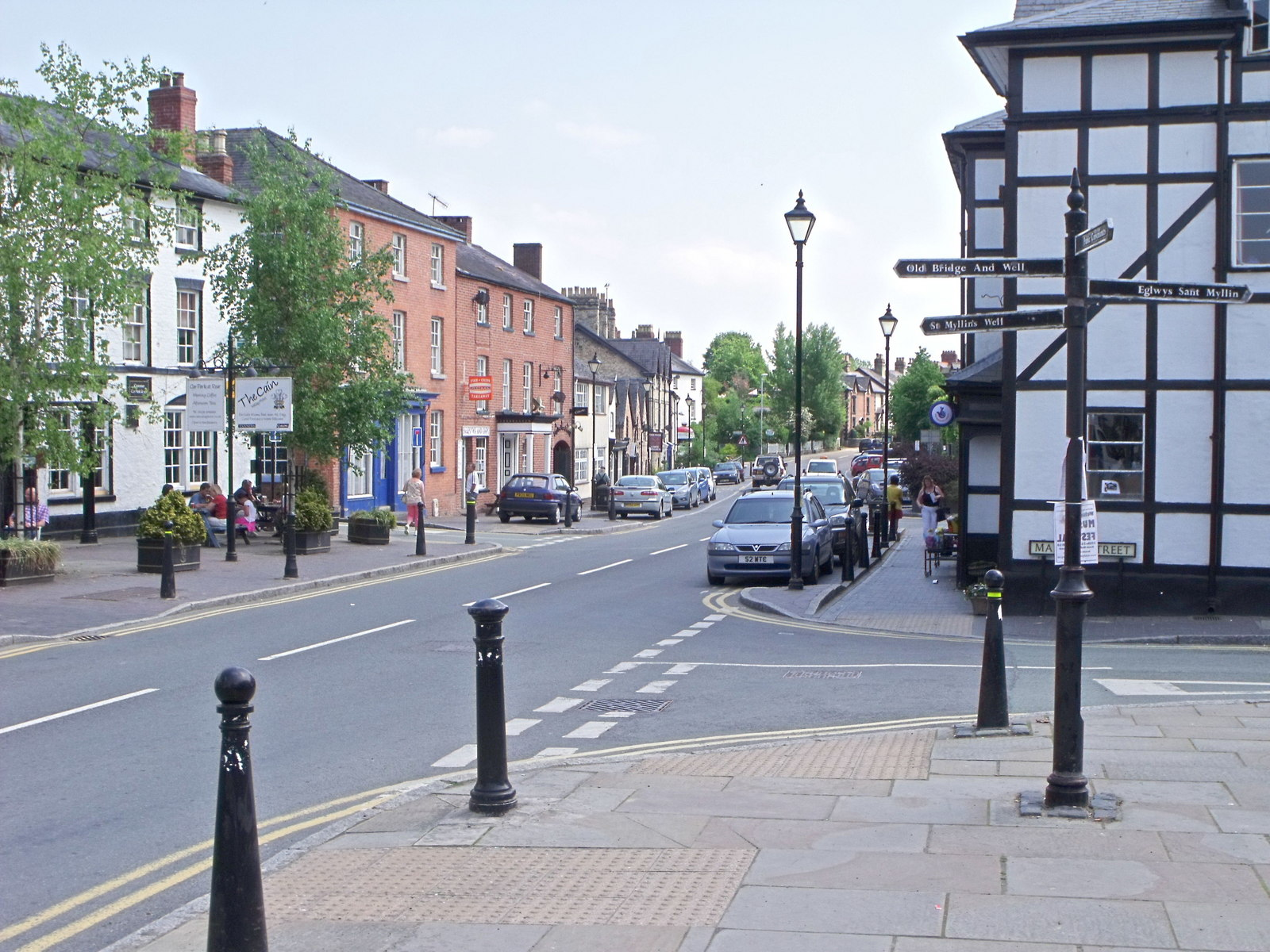
- Llanfyllin Town Centre

- Location within Powys
- Interactive map showing community boundary
- Area: 41.8 km^{2} (16.1 sq mi)
- Population: 1,585 (2021 census)
  - Density: 38/km^{2} (98/sq mi)
  - London: 180 mi (290 km)
- Principal area: Powys
- Preserved county: Powys
- Country: Wales
- Sovereign state: United Kingdom
- Post town: Llanfyllin
- Postcode district: SY22
- Police: Dyfed-Powys
- Fire: Mid and West Wales
- Ambulance: Welsh
- UK Parliament: Montgomeryshire and Glyndŵr
- Senedd Cymru – Welsh Parliament: Montgomeryshire
- Website: llanfyllin-tc.gov.wales

Llanfyllin (Welsh pronunciation: [ɬanˈvəɬɪn] – audio) is a market town and community in Powys, Wales. The community, which measures 41.8 square kilometres (16.1 sq mi), had a population at the 2021 census of 1,585 people in 694 households. The town's name means church or parish (llan) of St Myllin ('m' frequently mutates to 'f' in Welsh). The community includes the settlements of Bodfach, Ty Crwyn, Abernaint and several farms. Historically, Llanfyllin was part of Montgomeryshire.

== History ==
The town lies between Shrewsbury and Bala, for a long time the key market towns in this area of Wales and the Welsh borders. At nearby Bodyddon there is evidence of an early British settlement. Llanfyllin may be the "Mediolanum among the Ordovices" described in Ptolemy's Geography (c. AD 150), although others argue for Meifod or Caersws.

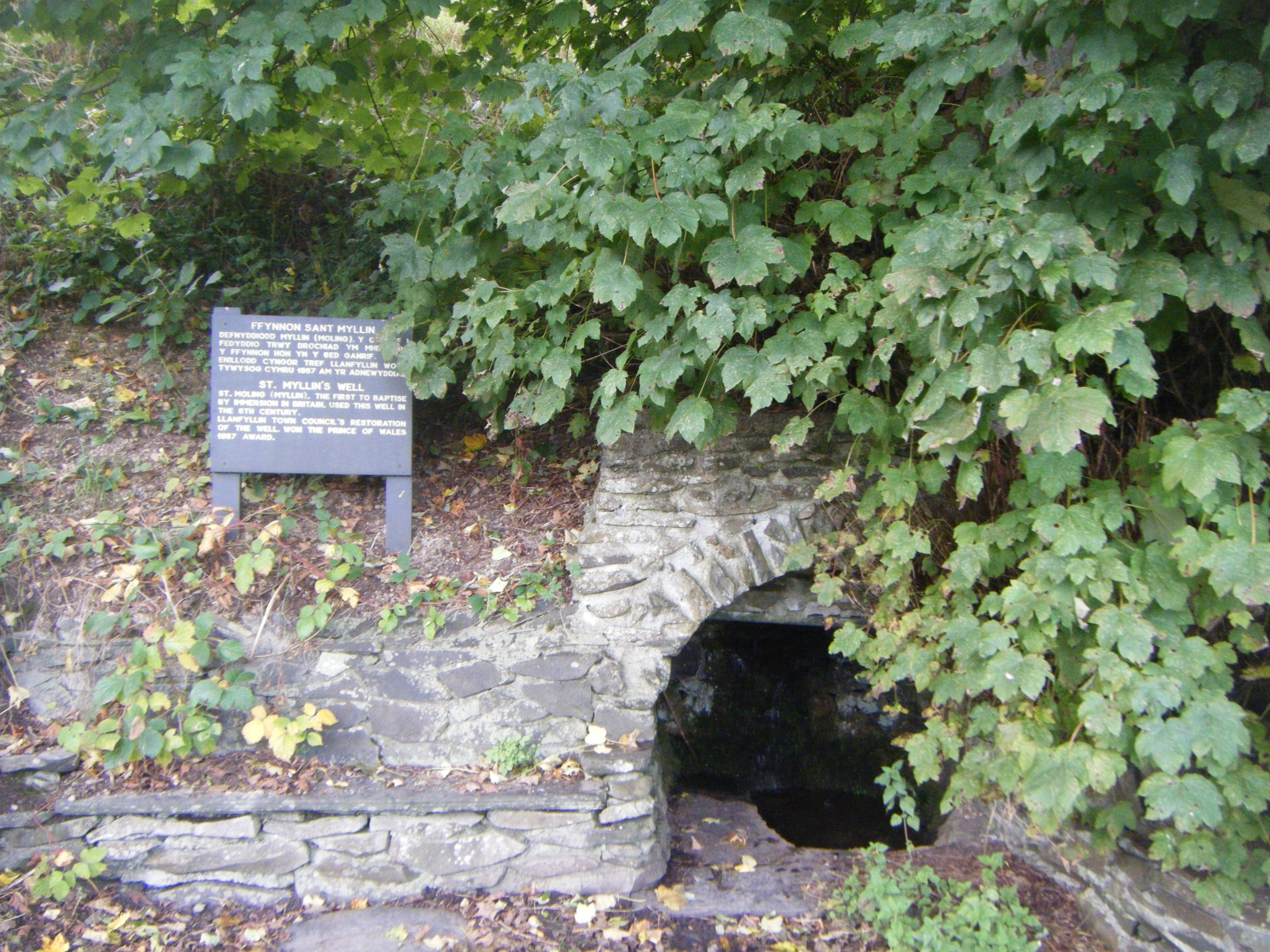
The holy well

The town is known for St Myllin's Well, a holy well. The well is dedicated to Saint Myllin, who is reputed to have baptised people here in the sixth century. The parish church is also dedicated to Saint Myllin. There is a tradition that Saint Myllin is the Irish bishop, Saint Mo Ling (also named Moling Luachra) (614–697). However, this is uncertain. There is no record of Mo Ling travelling to Wales, and there is a tradition that Myllin is buried under the altar of Llanfyllin church whereas Mo Ling is believed to have been buried at his monastery in Ireland.

The medieval motte-and-bailey castle of Tomen yr Allt was probably destroyed by Llywelyn ap Gruffudd in 1257. The castle earthworks are still present.

Llanfyllin was granted a charter as a market town in 1293 under Edward I. The charter was confirmed by Edward de Charlton, Lord of Powys under Henry V. Llanfyllin Town Hall, which dated from 1789, and served as the meeting place of the borough council, was demolished in 1960.

== Geography ==
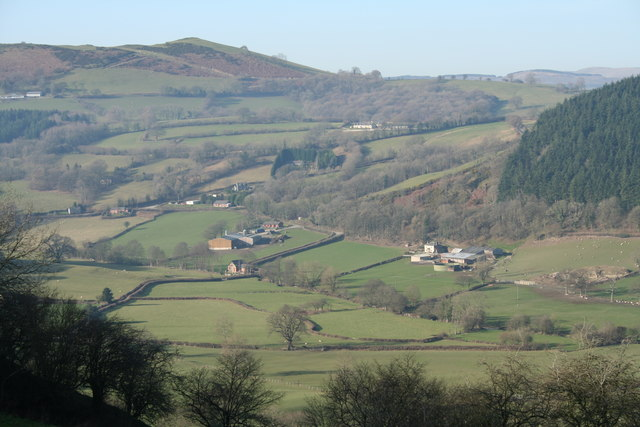
The valley of the River Cain near Llanfyllin

The town lies in the valley of the River Cain near the Berwyn Mountains in Montgomeryshire, 14 miles (23 km) southwest of Oswestry and 15 miles (24 km) from Montgomery. The River Cain is joined by the small River Abel in Llanfyllin (presumably named after Cain and Abel in the Bible), and meanders through the valley, flowing into the River Vyrnwy at Llansantffraid.

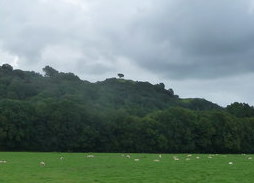
The Lonely Tree

Green Hall Hill stands above the town and was known for the Lonely Tree of Llanfyllin, a large Scots pine in an isolated position on the hilltop. It was estimated to have been 200 years old when it fell in a storm in February 2014.. It featured in several local traditions: it was hugged for good fortune, marriages were proposed at the tree and cremation ashes were scattered beneath it. It was named Wales Tree of the Year 2014 by the Woodland Trust.

== Governance ==
Llanfyllin Council forms the lowest tier of local government and as of 2026 has 15 councillors.

Llanfyllin is an electoral ward of Powys County Council. It is represented by one county councillor who, since 2008, has been Welsh Conservative Party representative Peter Lewis.

For centuries, Llanfyllin was part of Montgomeryshire, which was an administrative county until 1974, and a district of Powys from 1974 until 1996. From 1836 until 1974, Llanfyllin was a municipal borough.

== Demographics ==
Census population of Llanfyllin parish
Census	Population	Female	Male	Households	Source
2001	1,407	703	704	606	
2011	1,532	726	806	675	
2021	1,585	769	816	694	

== Landmarks ==
Llanfyllin is noteworthy for the quality and quantity of its buildings in locally made brick.

=== Church of St Myllin ===
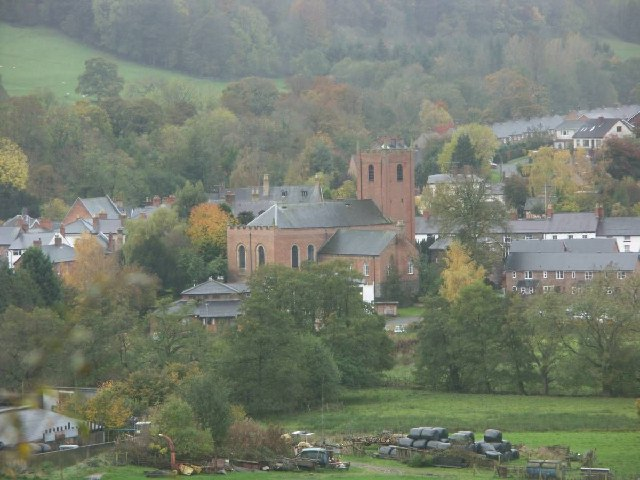
St Myllin's Church

The parish church of St Myllin (Church in Wales) was founded in the seventh century, according to tradition by St Myllin. The present building which dates to around 1706 is mainly of locally made red brick with battlements and a Welsh slate roof. It has a tower with six bells. It was adapted and extended by 1863 in the neo-Norman style, and restored in 1959.

=== Pendref Chapel ===
Pendref Chapel (Congregationalist) is said to be the oldest Welsh independent church in Powys. In 1640 its first minister was Vavasor Powell. The chapel was initially built in 1708; it was destroyed in the Jacobite rising of 1715, and was re-erected at government expense. The present building dates from 1829.

=== Rhosfawr hall house ===
A late-15th or early-16th century hall house at Rhosfawr (52.7844°N 3.3395°W) near Llanfyllin, it is a grade II* listed building. It has been used as a barn since the 17th century and has never been altered, and is perhaps the most complete and unaltered medium-sized hall house in Wales. It consists of four bays, crucks at the gables, a central truss, box-frame trusses and two tiers of trenched purlins with heavy curved wind braces. The central bays formed the hall.

=== The Hall ===
An historic house known as The Hall still exists on Vine Square within the town. Its origins as Plas Uchaf (Welsh for Upper Hall) are 16th century. It is a T-shaped two-storey timber-framed building with an attached open hall. It was remodelled in about 1599, adding a floor in the hall and stairs between the house and the hall. It was further remodelled in 1832 with the addition of an extra storey and three gables facing the square. King Charles I stayed at The Hall in November 1643. The Hall is Grade II listed.

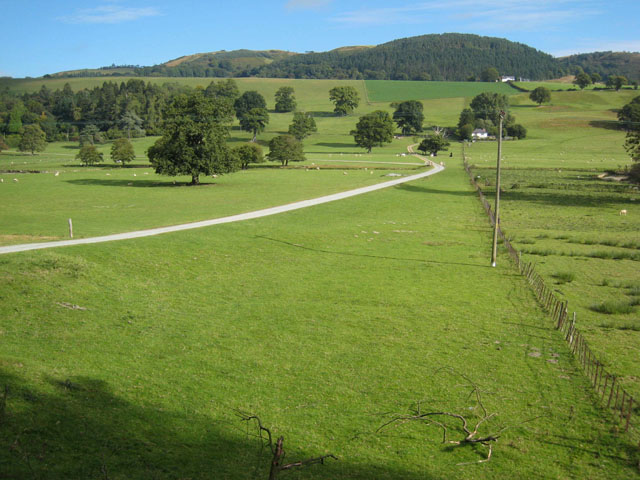
Bodfach Hall grounds

=== Bodfach Hall ===
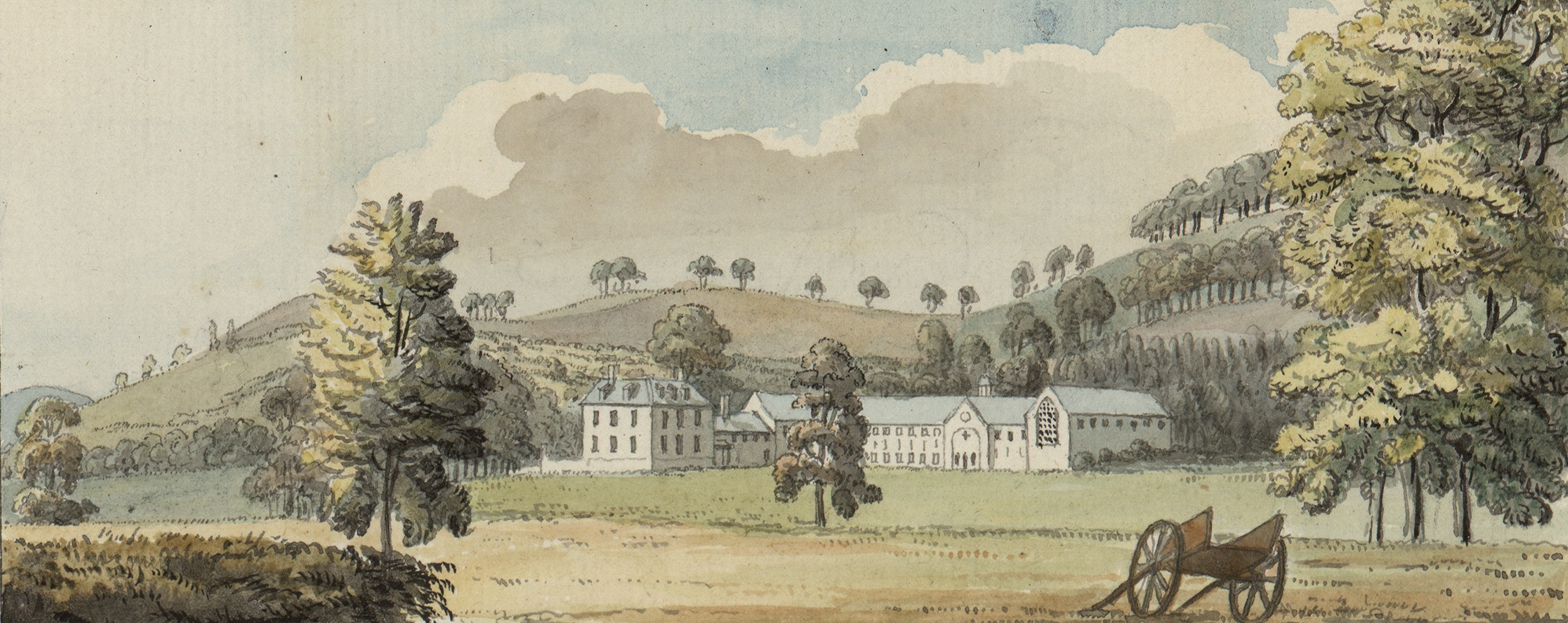
Bodfach house and grounds c.1781

Bodfach Hall is a grade II listed building about 1 km north-west of Llanfyllin in the hamlet of Bodfach. It is likely that a house was built on the site after the destruction in 1257 of Tomen yr Allt, a motte-and-bailey castle which stood on one of the hills above it. The property is first recorded in 1160 in the will of Madog ap Maredudd, Prince of Powys. Sion Kyffin, a descendant of Madog, extended a house on the site in 1661, as recorded in an inscription above an old door on the west of the house. The house was considerably modified and extended over the years and was rebuilt c. 1870. In 1945 the estate was broken up; most of the land was bought by its tenant farmers, and the hall and 33 acres were sold to one buyer to become an hotel. The grounds of the hall are listed at grade II on the Cadw/ICOMOS Register of Parks and Gardens of Special Historic Interest in Wales.

Llanfyllin Golf Club (now defunct) was founded in 1909 in Bodfach Park; the president was Sir John Lomax, the owner of Bodfach Hall and former High Sheriff of Montgomeryshire. It was a 9-hole course with a membership of 40 in 1914. It disappeared after World War I.

=== Llanfyllin Union Workhouse ===
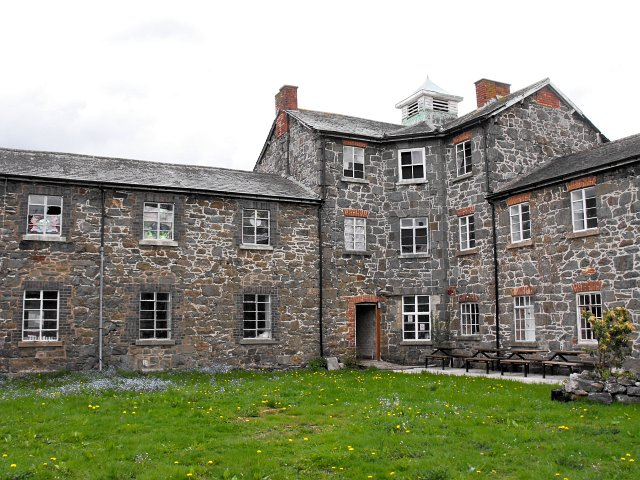
Llanfyllin Union Workhouse

The old Union Workhouse, known as Y Dolydd (Welsh for 'The Meadows')) locally, was built in 1838. This old Victorian building had stood empty since the mid-1980s until a local voluntary group, the Llanfyllin Workhouse Project, started to renovate it for community use. The first phase of the restoration was completed in 2021.

The Llanfyllin Workhouse Festival was held at the Union Workhouse until 2013.

== Education ==
The town has a primary school, and the bilingual Llanfyllin High School with approximately 1,000 pupils from the town and the surrounding area, about a quarter of whom travel from Shropshire, over the English border. The 2009 inspection of the high school reported GCSE examination results as well above the local and national average.

== Transport ==
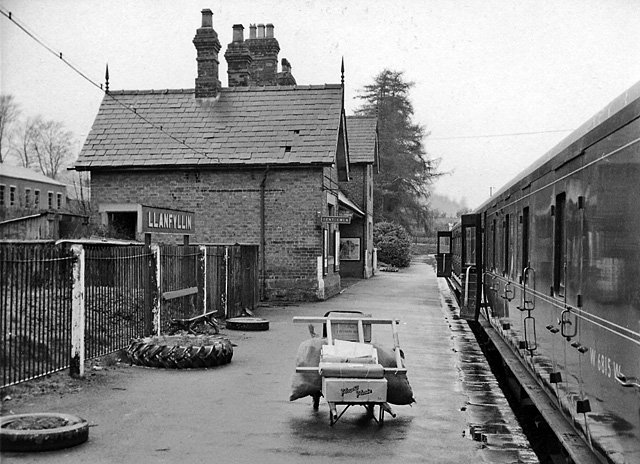
Llanfyllin railway station (closed 1965)

The town sits on the main route between Welshpool and Bala. The A490 road connects the town to Churchstoke and terminates just after passing through Llanfyllin.

The Llanfyllin branch of the Cambrian Railways opened in 1863, to provide access to the limestone quarries along the valley, terminating at Llanfyllin station. The main line from Oswestry to Newtown (Powys) closed in 1965, as did the branch line to Llanfyllin, under the Beeching cuts.

The main bus service is the number 76 to Welshpool operated by Tanat which runs Monday to Saturday.

== Notable people ==
- William Morgan (1545–1604), translator of the Bible into Welsh, was appointed rector of Llanfyllin in 1579. He was at the same time vicar of nearby Llanrhaeadr-ym-Mochnant. He was later Bishop of Llandaff and of St Asaph.
- Tomos Prys (Thomas Price) (c.1564–1634), soldier, sailor, buccaneer and poet, is said to have lived in The Hall.
- Roger Palmer, 1st Earl of Castlemaine (1634–1705), courtier, diplomat and politician lived in The Hall. He was the husband of Charles II's mistress Barbara Palmer and was James II's ambassador to the Vatican.
- David Miall Edwards (1873–1941), a Welsh Non-conformist writer and theologian.
- Clement Davies (1884–1962), leader of the Liberal Party, 1945 to 1956.
- Robert Richards (1884–1954), Labour politician and Under-Secretary of State for India, 1924. He attended the county school in the town.
- Susannah Jane Rankin (1897–1989), Congregational minister, linguist and missionary in Papua New Guinea.
- Rama Samaraweera (1926–2021), artist, lived, worked and died in Llanfyllin.
- Ryan Davies (1937–1977), entertainer, lived at the Union Workhouse as a child, when his parents were managing an old-people's home in the building.
- Elizabeth Vaughan (born 1937), soprano, was born in Llanfyllin.
- Eric Ramsay (football manager) (1991–), football manager, grew up in Llanfyllin and attended Llanfyllin High School.
