= Llanfyllin Branch =

Former railway line in Wales

Coordinates: 52.77889°N 3.09998°W

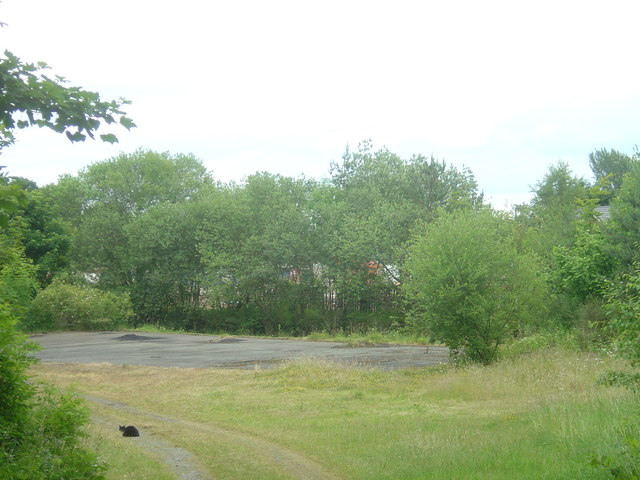
The former goods yard at Llanymynech railway station

The Llanfyllin Branch was a railway line extension of the Oswestry and Newtown Railway to access the limestone resources within the Llanfyllin area; it opened in 1863.

== Construction ==
Surveyed and engineered by a Mr Savin and his brother-in-law, Mr Ward, a stipulation of the authorising Act of Parliament was that the railway should not interfere with the existing access rights of: tramways of the mines; the Ellesmere Canal company branch; or the Tanat Valley Light Railway (TVLR). This necessitated the construction of two bridges on what was a relatively flat valley floor.

== Route ==
Branching off from the former Oswestry and Newtown Railway at Llanymynech station, the lines access was to the north of the station to provide sufficient clearance height before crossing the canal. Unable to justify the expense of an aqueduct to pass under the canal, trains would hence proceed up what was called the "Rock Siding" towards the Hoffmann kilns, before reversing onto the Llanfyllin branch.

After crossing the canal, the Llanfyllin branch diverged north on the loopline through Carreghofa Halt, before branching southwest before the junction of the loopline with the TVLR. The Nantmawr Branch was next on the loopline, while the Porth-y-waen branch was after the station at Porthywaen Halt, in fact not much more than a siding to serve the Porth-y-waen limestone quarry. The loopline then accessed the O&NR again, this time merging north via Llynclys junction towards Weston Wharf and onwards to the companies headquarters in the station at Oswestry.

After leaving the loopline, the Llanfyllin branch passed through: Llansantffraid; Llanfechain; Bryngwyn; before terminating at Llanfyllin.

=== Potteries, Shrewsbury and North Wales Railway ===
The last piece of transport to arrive in Llanymynech was the Potteries, Shrewsbury and North Wales Railway (Potts), which ran from Shrewsbury Abbey. To access the Nantmawr branch for similar mineral extraction purposes, it ran under the O&NR via a bridge, and the canal via an aqueduct.

However, the Potts ran into financial difficulties, and services were suspended in June 1880. On 28 January 1881 the CR came to an agreement with the Potts receiver and its Chief Engineer Richard Samuel Francis (who also owned the mineral rights along the Nantmawr valley), to maintain the stunted Nantmawr branch. The Cambrian would pay a royalty of 3d per ton, which was renewed but the toll was reduced to 2d a ton in January 1886.

On 11 April 1894 the CR agreed to build a 0.5-mile (0.80 km) deviation from the Llanfyllin branch to join the Nantmawr line at Wern. This enabled the CR to access the Potts aqueduct under the canal, and hence stop use of the "Rock Siding" with immediate effect. The CR also agreed to junction the Potts on the level with the CR mainline north of Llanymynech station. The Nantmawr branch reopened as a Cambrian subsidiary on 1 January 1896, and the deviation to the Llanfyllin branch followed on 27 January. A lease for 99 years followed on 12 April 1900, with the CR paying £555 a year: half itself, half from the TVLR which opened on 5 January 1904.

The "Rock Siding" continued to serve the kilns until their closure in 1914, after which it was used to store redundant wagons, until the siding was removed in 1939.

== Operations ==
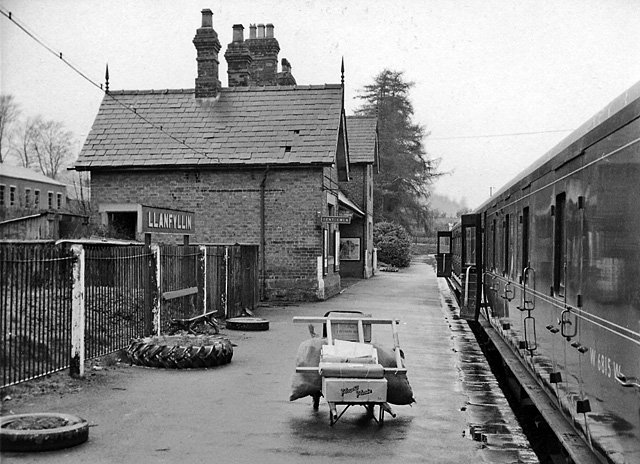
Llanfyllin station, 12 April 1960

The line opened for operations from 10 April 1863. It was worked by typical CR motive power of 0-6-0 and GWR 2301 Class "Dean Goods" up till the mid-1950s after which Ivatt Class 2 locomotives of the 46503–46527 series were almost exclusively used. Operations on the line were controlled by signal boxes at: Llanymynech; Llansantffraid; and Llanfyllin.

== Closure ==
After being controlled by the Great Western Railway from the Railways Act 1921, and then British Railways Western division from nationalisation in 1948 onwards, the former CR lines were vested to the London Midland Region of British Railways from 1963. The route from Llynclys junction south to Welshpool (Buttington Junction), closed on 18 January 1965.

The result was the simultaneous closure of the TVLR, as well as the Porthywaen and the Llanfyllin branches. A single line south from Oswestry to Llynclys junction enabled stone services to continue on the Nantmawr branch as far as Llanyblodwel quarry until 1988.

== Present ==
The line from Gobowen to Llanyblodwel remains in place, and forms the core revival plan of the Cambrian Heritage Railways to join with the enthusiast revived TVLR at Llanddu junction (Blodwel Quarry). Neither society has a plan at present to revive the Llanfyllin branch.
