= 2022–23 1. FC Kaiserslautern season =

1. FC Kaiserslautern
2022–23 season
- Head coach: Dirk Schuster
- Stadium: Fritz-Walter-Stadion
- 2. Bundesliga: 9th
- DFB-Pokal: First round
- Top goalscorer: League: Terrence Boyd (13); All: Terrence Boyd (13)
Home colours	Away colours	Third colours

The 2022–23 season was the 123rd season in the history of 1. FC Kaiserslautern and their first season back in the second division. The club participated in the 2. Bundesliga and DFB-Pokal.

== Players ==
Note: Flags indicate national team as defined under FIFA eligibility rules; some limited exceptions apply. Players may hold more than one non-FIFA nationality.

No.	Pos.	Nation	Player
1	GK	GER	Andreas Luthe
2	DF	GER	Boris Tomiak
4	MF	GER	Nicolai Rapp (on loan from Werder Bremen)
5	DF	GER	Kevin Kraus
7	MF	GER	Marlon Ritter
8	MF	GER	Jean Zimmer (captain)
9	FW	TUR	Muhammed Kiprit
10	MF	GER	Philipp Klement
11	MF	GER	Kenny Prince Redondo
13	FW	USA	Terrence Boyd
16	MF	GER	Julian Niehues
17	MF	GER	René Klingenburg
18	GK	GER	Julian Krahl
19	FW	GER	Daniel Hanslik

No.	Pos.	Nation	Player
20	DF	GER	Dominik Schad
21	MF	GER	Hendrick Zuck (vice-captain)
22	DF	GER	Lars Bünning
23	DF	GER	Philipp Hercher
25	FW	GER	Aaron Opoku
27	FW	GER	Lex-Tyger Lobinger
28	FW	FRA	Nicolas de Préville
30	GK	BIH	Avdo Spahic
31	FW	GER	Ben Zolinski
32	DF	GER	Robin Bormuth (on loan from Paderborn)
33	GK	GER	Jonas Weyand
35	FW	GER	Angelos Stavridis
37	DF	GER	Erik Durm
39	MF	GER	Aaron Basenach

=== Out on loan ===
Note: Flags indicate national team as defined under FIFA eligibility rules; some limited exceptions apply. Players may hold more than one non-FIFA nationality.

No. / Pos. / Nation / Player; — / DF / GER / Neal Gibs (at Astoria Walldorf until 30 June 2023)	No. / Pos. / Nation / Player; — / MF / TUR / Hikmet Çiftçi (at Göztepe until 30 June 2023)

== Pre-season and friendlies ==
Win Draw Loss

18 June 2022 Friendly	SV Rulzheim (Germany)	0–9	(Germany) 1. FC Kaiserslautern	Rülzheim, Germany
14:00 CEST (UTC+2)		Report	Kiprit 19'; Wunderlich 20'; Redondo 29', 44'; Hercher 34'; Boyd 55', 90'; Kraus 73'; Hanslik 88'	Stadium: Rülzheim Rasenplatz 1

28 June 2022 Friendly	1. FC Kaiserslautern (Germany)	3–4	(Switzerland) Lugano	Mals, Italy
17:30 CEST (UTC+2)				Stadium: Stadio Malles Venosta

2 July 2022 Friendly	1. FC Kaiserslautern (Germany)	3–0	(Germany) Unterhaching	Mals, Italy
15:30 CEST (UTC+2)	Zolinski 13'; Lobinger 54'; Wunderlich 67'	Report		Stadium: Stadio Malles Venosta

9 July 2022 Friendly	1. FC Kaiserslautern (Germany)	4–1	(Belgium) Eupen	Pirmasens, Germany
15:00 CEST (UTC+2)	Wunderlich 60'; Lobinger 64', 68'; Redondo 89'	Report	Offermann 84'	Stadium: Sportpark Husterhöhe; Attendance: 2,223

22 September 2022 Friendly	FK Pirmasens (Germany)	1–4	(Germany) 1. FC Kaiserslautern	Pirmasens, Germany
19:00 CEST (UTC+2)	Gutmann 81'		Kiprit 6'; Lobinger 34', 60'; Wunderlich 79'	Stadium: Sportpark Husterhöhe

16 December 2022 Friendly	1. FC Kaiserslautern (Germany)	2–0	(Germany) SV Wehen Wiesbaden	Kaiserslautern, Germany
13:30 CET (UTC+1)	Leibrock 61'; Hercher 71'	Report		Stadium: Fritz-Walter-Stadion Platz 4

5 January 2023 Friendly	1. FC Kaiserslautern (Germany)	1–2	(Hungary) Mezőkövesdi SE	Belek, Turkey
15:00 (UTC+3)

8 January 2023 Friendly	1. FC Kaiserslautern (Germany)	1–1	(Germany) 1860 Munich	Belek, Turkey
16:00 (UTC+3)

15 January 2023 Friendly	1. FC Kaiserslautern (Germany)	4–0	(Germany) Rot-Weiß Erfurt	Kaiserslautern, Germany
14:00 (CET) (UTC+1)				Stadium: Fritz-Walter-Stadion

== Competitions ==
=== Overall record ===
Competition	First match	Last match	Starting round	Final position	Record							
Competition	First match	Last match	Starting round	Final position	Pld	W	D	L	GF	GA	GD	Win %
2. Bundesliga	15 July 2022	28 May 2023	Matchday 1	9th	34	11	12	11	47	48	−1	32.35
DFB-Pokal	31 July 2022		First round	First round	1	0	0	1	1	2	−1	0.00
Total					35	11	12	12	48	50	−2	31.43

Source: Soccerway

=== 2. Bundesliga ===
==== League table ====
Pos	Team	Pld	W	D	L	GF	GA	GD	Pts
7	Karlsruher SC	34	13	7	14	56	53	+3	46
8	Holstein Kiel	34	12	10	12	58	61	−3	46
9	1. FC Kaiserslautern	34	11	12	11	47	48	−1	45
10	Hannover 96	34	12	8	14	50	55	−5	44
11	1. FC Magdeburg	34	12	7	15	48	55	−7	43

Source: DFB
Rules for classification: 1) Points; 2) Goal difference; 3) Goals scored; 4) Head-to-head results; 5) Head-to-head away goals scored; 6) Away goals scored; 7) Play-off.

==== Results summary ====
Overall								Home						Away					
Pld	W	D	L	GF	GA	GD	Pts	W	D	L	GF	GA	GD	W	D	L	GF	GA	GD
34	11	12	11	47	48	−1	45	6	6	5	26	26	0	5	6	6	21	22	−1

Source: DFB

==== Results by round ====
Round	1	2	3	4	5	6	7	8	9	10	11	12	13	14	15	16	17
Ground	H	A	H	H	A	H	A	H	A	H	A	H	A	H	A	H	A
Result	W	D	W	L	W	D	D	D	D	D	D	L	W	D	W	W	W
Position	5	5	2	8	4	6	6	7	7	7	8	9	8	7	7	7	4

Updated to match(es) played on 11 November 2022. Source: DFB
A = Away; H = Home; W = Win; D = Draw; L = Loss

==== Matches ====
The league fixtures were announced on 17 June 2022.

15 July 2022 1	1. FC Kaiserslautern	2–1	Hannover 96	Kaiserslautern
20:30 CEST (UTC+2)	Wunderlich 11'; Kraus 90+2'		Nielsen 80'	Stadium: Fritz-Walter-Stadion

23 July 2022 2	Holstein Kiel	2–2	1. FC Kaiserslautern	Kiel
13:00 CEST (UTC+2)	Reese 51', 57'		Hanslik 32'; Boyd 62'	Stadium: Holstein-Stadion

7 August 2022 3	1. FC Kaiserslautern	2–1	FC St. Pauli	Kaiserslautern
13:30 CEST (UTC+2)				Stadium: Fritz-Walter-Stadion

12 August 2022 4	1. FC Kaiserslautern	0–1	SC Paderborn	Kaiserslautern
18:30 CEST (UTC+2)	Ritter (yellow card) 34'; Zuck (red card) 49'; Tomiak (yellow card) 52'; Lobinger (yellow card) 90+2'	Report	Pieringer (yellow card) 52'; Schallenberg (yellow card) 63'; Huth (yellow card) 66'; Platte 82'	Stadium: Fritz-Walter-Stadion; Attendance: 33,098; Referee: (Germany) Matthias Jöllenbeck

21 August 2022 5	Greuther Fürth	1–3	1. FC Kaiserslautern	Fürth
13:30 CEST (UTC+2)	Raschl 13'	Report	Tomiak (yellow card) 29'; Durm (yellow card) 45'; Hercher 46'; Wunderlich 54'; Redondo 79'; Lobinger (yellow card) 81'	Stadium: Sportpark Ronhof Thomas Sommer; Attendance: 12,475; Referee: (Germany) Tobias Stieler

28 August 2022 6	1. FC Kaiserslautern	4–4	1. FC Magdeburg	Kaiserslautern
13:30 CEST (UTC+2)	Boyd 7'; Tomiak 40'; Hercher 47'; Wunderlich 66' (pen.); Zimmer (yellow card) 90+3'	Report	Kwarteng 11' 22'; El Hankouri 17'; Condé (yellow card) 64'; Bittroff (yellow card) 73'; Tomiak 79' (o.g.); Bell Bell (yellow card) 90+3'	Stadium: Fritz-Walter-Stadion; Attendance: 35,643; Referee: (Germany) Robin Braun

4 September 2022 7	Sandhausen	0–0	1. FC Kaiserslautern	Sandhausen
13:30 CEST (UTC+2)	Okoroji (yellow card) 23'; Papela (yellow card) 69'; Ajdini (yellow card) 76'	Report	Zimmer (yellow card) 23'; Durm (yellow card) 78'; Klement (yellow card) 90'	Stadium: BWT-Stadion am Hardtwald; Attendance: 11,378; Referee: (Germany) Benjamin Brand

11 September 2022 8	1. FC Kaiserslautern	3–3	Darmstadt	Kaiserslautern
13:30 CEST (UTC+2)	Luthe (yellow card) 45+1'; Redondo 74' 87'; Wunderlich 77' (pen.)	Report	Schnellhardt (yellow card) 36'; Kempe 45+2' (pen.); Tietz 49'; Schuhen (yellow card) 67'; Seydel (yellow card) 90' (goal) 90+1'	Stadium: Fritz-Walter-Stadion; Attendance: 38,380; Referee: (Germany) Marco Fritz

18 September 2022 9	1. FC Heidenheim	2–2	1. FC Kaiserslautern	Heidenheim an der Brenz
13:30 CEST (UTC+2)	Beste 17'; Busch 44' (yellow card) 61'	Report	Boyd 20' 60'; Luthe (red card) 41'; Niehues (yellow card) 67'; Durm (yellow card) 90+7'	Stadium: Voith-Arena; Attendance: 11,189; Referee: (Germany) Tobias Reichel

2 October 2022 10	1. FC Kaiserslautern	1–1	Eintracht Braunschweig	Kaiserslautern
13:30 CEST (UTC+2)	Niehues (yellow card) 52'; Tomiak 55'; Klement (yellow card) 73'	Report	Marx (yellow card) 40'; Lauberbach 52'	Stadium: Fritz-Walter-Stadion; Attendance: 33,000; Referee: (Germany) Robert Schröder

8 October 2022 11	Hamburg	1–1	1. FC Kaiserslautern	Hamburg
20:30 CEST (UTC+2)	Glatzel 24'	Report	Lobinger 82'	Stadium: Volksparkstadion; Attendance: 57,000; Referee: (Germany) Robert Hartmann (referee)

16 October 2022 12	1. FC Kaiserslautern	0–3	Jahn Regensburg	Kaiserslautern
13:30 CEST (UTC+2)	Zimmer (yellow card) 63'	Report	Albers 8' 57'; Stojanović (yellow card) 33'; Gimber (yellow card) 53'; Kennedy (yellow card) 67'; Owusu 85'	Stadium: Fritz-Walter-Stadion; Attendance: 33,060; Referee: (Germany) Martin Thomsen

21 October 2022 13	Hansa Rostock	0–2	1. FC Kaiserslautern	Rostock
18:30 CEST (UTC+2)	Schumacher (yellow card) 32'; Hinterseer (yellow card) 36'	Report	Tomiak (yellow card) 36'; Klement (yellow card) 48'; Boyd 67' 82'	Stadium: Ostseestadion; Attendance: 25,000; Referee: (Germany) Robert Kampka

29 October 2022 14	1. FC Kaiserslautern	0–0	1. FC Nürnberg	Kaiserslautern
13:00 CEST (UTC+2)	Zimmer (yellow card) 37'; Bormuth (yellow card) 51'	Report	Gyamerah (yellow card) 38'	Stadium: Fritz-Walter-Stadion; Attendance: 46,895; Referee: (Germany) Michael Bacher

5 November 2022 15	Arminia Bielefeld	2–3	1. FC Kaiserslautern	Bielefeld
20:30 CET (UTC+1)	Hack 60', 74' (pen.)	Report	Klement 54'; Opoku 57'; Hanslik 88'	Stadium: Schüco-Arena; Attendance: 24,651; Referee: (Germany) Patrick Alt

8 November 2022 16	1. FC Kaiserslautern	2–0	Karlsruher SC	Kaiserslautern
18:30 CET (UTC+1)	Boyd 34'; Redondo 86'	Report		Stadium: Fritz-Walter-Stadion; Attendance: 43,852; Referee: (Germany) Robert Schröder

11 November 2022 17	Fortuna Düsseldorf	1–2	1. FC Kaiserslautern	Düsseldorf
18:30 CET (UTC+1)	Karbownik 14'	Report	Kraus 50'; Klement 90+6'	Stadium: Merkur Spiel-Arena; Attendance: 44,422; Referee: (Germany) Benjamin Cortus

=== DFB-Pokal ===
31 July 2022 First round	1. FC Kaiserslautern	1–2 (a.e.t.)	SC Freiburg	Kaiserslautern
15:31 CEST (UTC+2)	Niehues (yellow card) 1'; Ritter 33', (yellow card) 112'; Wunderlich (yellow card) 39'; Lobinger (yellow card) 90'; Zuck (yellow card) 95'	Report	Lienhart (yellow card) 58'; Sallai 82'; Höfler (yellow card) 101'; Kyereh (yellow card) 106'; Dōan 111'	Stadium: Fritz-Walter-Stadion; Attendance: 38,317; Referee: Jörg Jablonksi
