= 2015–16 Borussia Dortmund season =

2015–16 season of Borussia Dortmund

Borussia Dortmund
2015–16 season
- Chairman: Hans-Joachim Watzke
- Head coach: Thomas Tuchel
- Stadium: Signal Iduna Park
- Bundesliga: 2nd
- DFB-Pokal: Runners-up
- UEFA Europa League: Quarter-finals
- Top goalscorer: League: Pierre-Emerick Aubameyang (25); All: Pierre-Emerick Aubameyang (39)
Home colours	Away colours	Third colours

The 2015–16 Borussia Dortmund season was the 105th season (and 106th overall year) in the football club's history and 40th consecutive and 49th overall season in the top flight of German football, the Bundesliga, having been promoted from the 2. Bundesliga in 1976.

In addition to the domestic league, Borussia Dortmund also participated in this season's editions of the domestic cup, the DFB-Pokal, and the second-tier continental cup, the UEFA Europa League. This was the 43rd season for the club in the Westfalenstadion, located in Dortmund, Germany. The stadium had a capacity of 81,359 for Bundesliga matches, and a capacity of 65,851 for continental matches. The season covered a period from 1 July 2015 to 30 June 2016.

The season was the first since 2000–01 without Sebastian Kehl, who retired after the 2014–15 season.

== Season overview ==
=== Background ===
Dortmund finished the previous season in seventh place in the Bundesliga, one of its worst finishes in recent years. It won the DFL-Supercup in the previous season, but was unable to qualify for this season. Dortmund also progressed to the round of 16 in the 2014–15 UEFA Champions League before being knocked out by Juventus. This season, Dortmund only qualified for the 2015–16 UEFA Europa League, the second-tier continental cup. They entered the competition in the third qualifying round. If they advance from this round, they must also get through the play-off round before qualifying for the group stage. Last season, Dortmund ended up as runners-up of the DFB-Pokal after losing to VfL Wolfsburg. Dortmund will begin the season with new coach Thomas Tuchel, who replaced Jürgen Klopp.

=== Pre-season ===
The pre-season began with training starting on 29 June 2015. The first pre-season friendly was on 3 July against VfL Rhede. The next day, the season opening event took place with another friendly match against "Team Gold". After this, Dortmund went on a tour of Asia from 5–11 July. They played in two friendlies against Kawasaki Frontale in Japan on 7 July and Johor Darul Ta'zim (Southern Tigers) in Malaysia on 9 July. They then returned to Germany to face VfL Bochum on 17 July before heading to Bad Ragaz in Switzerland for a training camp. This took place from 19–26 July. They faced FC Luzern on 21 July and Juventus on 25 July, the team who knocked them out of the previous edition of the Champions League. After the Swiss training camp, they returned to Germany.

=== July–August ===
Competitive matches began on 30 July with the first leg of the UEFA Europa League third qualifying round. The draw for who they will face took place on 17 July. Dortmund were drawn to Austria side Wolfsberger AC. The second leg will take place on 6 August. Round 1 of the DFB-Pokal will take place on 7–10 August, where Dortmund will face Chemnitzer FC away. Matchday 1 of the Bundesliga will then take place from 14–16 August. If Dortmund advances to the play-off round, they will play the first leg on 20 August and the second leg on 27 August. The draw would be talking place on 7 August.

In their first Bundesliga game, Dortmund convincingly beat Borussia Mönchengladbach 4–0 with goals from Marco Reus, Pierre-Emerick Aubameyang and two from Henrikh Mkhitaryan, allowing them to temporarily claim position second in the league, behind rivals Bayern Munich on goal difference.

== Players ==
Players and squad numbers last updated on 28 September 2015.
Note: Flags indicate national team as has been defined under FIFA eligibility rules. Players may hold more than one non-FIFA nationality.

No.	Nat.	Position(s)	Name
Goalkeepers
1	GK	GER	Roman Weidenfeller (vice-captain)
38	GK	SUI	Roman Bürki
39	GK	GER	Hendrik Bonmann
Defenders
3	DF	KOR	Park Joo-ho
4	DF	SRB	Neven Subotić
15	DF	GER	Mats Hummels (Captain)
25	DF	GRE	Sokratis Papastathopoulos
26	DF	POL	Łukasz Piszczek
28	DF	GER	Matthias Ginter
29	DF	GER	Marcel Schmelzer
37	DF	GER	Erik Durm
Midfielders
6	MF	GER	Sven Bender
8	MF	GER	İlkay Gündoğan
10	MF	ARM	Henrikh Mkhitaryan
14	MF	GER	Moritz Leitner
18	MF	TUR	Nuri Şahin
22	MF	USA	Christian Pulisic
23	MF	JPN	Shinji Kagawa
27	MF	GER	Gonzalo Castro
30	MF	GER	Felix Passlack
33	MF	GER	Julian Weigl
Forwards
11	FW	GER	Marco Reus (2nd vice-captain)
20	FW	COL	Adrián Ramos
17	FW	GAB	Pierre-Emerick Aubameyang

== Transfers ==
=== In ===
No.	Pos.	Nat.	Name	Age	EU	Moving from	Type	Transfer window	Ends	Transfer fee	Source
27	MF	(Germany)	Gonzalo Castro	28	EU	Bayer Leverkusen	Transfer	Summer	2019	€11 million	
33	MF	(Germany)	Julian Weigl	19	EU	1860 Munich	Transfer	Summer	2019	Undisclosed	
38	GK	(Switzerland)	Roman Bürki	24	EU	SC Freiburg	Transfer	Summer	2019	€3.5 million	
7	MF	(Germany)	Jonas Hofmann	22	EU	Mainz 05	Loan Return	Summer	2018	Free	
14	MF	(Germany)	Moritz Leitner	22	EU	VfB Stuttgart	Loan Return	Summer	2017	Free	
3	DF	(South Korea)	Park Joo-ho	28	EU	Mainz 05	Transfer	Summer	2018	Undisclosed	
9	MF	(Belgium)	Adnan Januzaj	20	EU	Manchester United (England)	Loan	Summer	2016	Free	

Total spending: ▼€20 million

=== Out ===
No.	Pos.	Nat.	Name	Age	EU	Moving to	Type	Transfer window	Transfer fee	Source
5	MF	(Germany)	Sebastian Kehl	35	EU		Retirement	Summer	Free	
21	MF	(Germany)	Oliver Kirch	33	EU	SC Paderborn	Transfer	Summer	Free	
33	GK	(Serbia)	Zlatan Alomerović	24	EU	1. FC Kaiserslautern	Transfer	Summer	Undisclosed	
22	GK	(Australia)	Mitchell Langerak	26	EU	VfB Stuttgart	Transfer	Summer	Undisclosed	
14	MF	(Serbia)	Miloš Jojić	23	EU	1. FC Köln	Transfer	Summer	Undisclosed	
40	LW	(Germany)	Jeremy Dudziak	20	EU	FC St. Pauli	Transfer	Summer	Undisclosed	
9	FW	(Italy)	Ciro Immobile	25	EU	Sevilla	Loan	Summer	Undisclosed	
23	MF	(Slovenia)	Kevin Kampl	27	EU	Bayer Leverkusen	Transfer	Summer	Undisclosed	
16	MF	(Poland)	Jakub Błaszczykowski	29	EU	Fiorentina (Italy)	Loan	Summer	Undisclosed (with a buy option)	
19	MF	(Germany)	Kevin Großkreutz	27	EU	Galatasaray (Turkey)	Transfer	Summer	Undisclosed	
7	LW	(Germany)	Jonas Hofmann	22	EU	Borussia Mönchengladbach	Transfer	Winter	Undisclosed	
9	FW	(Italy)	Ciro Immobile	25	EU	Sevilla	Transfer	Winter	Undisclosed	

== Statistics ==
=== Appearances and goals ===
No.	Pos	Nat	Player	Total		Bundesliga		DFB-Pokal		Europa League	
No.	Pos	Nat	Player	Apps	Goals	Apps	Goals	Apps	Goals	Apps	Goals
Goalkeepers
1	GK	(Germany) GER	Roman Weidenfeller	14	0	1	0	0	0	13	0
38	GK	(Switzerland) SUI	Roman Bürki	42	0	33	0	6	0	3	0
39	GK	(Germany) GER	Hendrik Bonmann	0	0	0	0	0	0	0	0
Defenders
3	DF	(South Korea) KOR	Park Joo-ho	9	1	4+1	0	0	0	4	1
4	DF	(Serbia) SRB	Neven Subotić	11	0	5+1	0	0	0	3+2	0
15	DF	(Germany) GER	Mats Hummels	50	3	29+1	2	6	0	14	1
25	DF	(Greece) GRE	Sokratis Papastathopoulos	40	1	23+2	1	4+1	0	8+2	0
26	DF	(Poland) POL	Łukasz Piszczek	38	2	16+4	0	5+1	1	10+2	1
28	DF	(Germany) GER	Matthias Ginter	40	4	21+3	3	2+3	0	8+3	1
29	DF	(Germany) GER	Marcel Schmelzer	47	0	22+4	0	6	0	13+2	0
35	DF	(Germany) GER	Pascal Stenzel	1	0	0	0	0	0	1	0
37	DF	(Germany) GER	Erik Durm	20	1	10+4	1	1+2	0	2+1	0
Midfielders
6	MF	(Germany) GER	Sven Bender	35	0	14+5	0	4+1	0	8+3	0
8	MF	(Germany) GER	İlkay Gündoğan	40	3	22+3	1	4+1	1	8+2	1
9	MF	(Belgium) BEL	Adnan Januzaj	12	0	0+6	0	0+1	0	3+2	0
10	MF	(Armenia) ARM	Henrikh Mkhitaryan	52	23	28+3	11	6	5	14+1	7
14	MF	(Germany) GER	Moritz Leitner	13	0	2+7	0	0+1	0	0+3	0
18	MF	(Turkey) TUR	Nuri Şahin	12	0	6+3	0	0	0	1+2	0
22	MF	(United States) USA	Christian Pulisic	12	2	4+5	2	0	0	0+3	0
23	MF	(Japan) JPN	Shinji Kagawa	46	13	26+3	9	2+3	1	8+4	3
27	MF	(Germany) GER	Gonzalo Castro	41	7	16+9	3	5	3	9+2	1
30	MF	(Germany) GER	Felix Passlack	3	0	2+1	0	0	0	0	0
33	MF	(Germany) GER	Julian Weigl	51	0	25+5	0	4+1	0	13+3	0
Forwards
11	FW	(Germany) GER	Marco Reus	43	23	24+2	12	4	2	13	9
17	FW	(Gabon) GAB	Pierre-Emerick Aubameyang	49	39	28+3	25	4	3	12+2	11
20	FW	(Colombia) COL	Adrián Ramos	39	10	9+18	9	3	1	2+7	0
Players transferred out during the season
7	MF	(Germany) GER	Jonas Hofmann	14	2	4+3	1	0+1	0	5+1	1
23	MF	(Slovenia) SLO	Kevin Kampl	3	0	0+1	0	0	0	1+1	0

Last updated: 21 May 2016
Source: Competitions

=== Goalscorers ===
This includes all competitive matches. The list is sorted by shirt number when total goals are equal.

No.	Pos	Squad No.	Nat	Name	Bundesliga	DFB-Pokal	UEFA Europa League	Total
1	FW	17	(Gabon)	Pierre-Emerick Aubameyang	25	3	11	39
2	MF	10	(Armenia)	Henrikh Mkhitaryan	11	5	7	23
3	FW	11	(Germany)	Marco Reus	12	2	9	23
4	MF	23	(Japan)	Shinji Kagawa	9	1	3	13
5	FW	21	(Colombia)	Adrián Ramos	9	1	0	10
6	MF	27	(Germany)	Gonzalo Castro	2	3	1	6
6	DF	28	(Germany)	Matthias Ginter	3	0	1	4
8	DF	3	(South Korea)	Park Joo-ho	0	0	1	1
9	MF	7	(Germany)	Jonas Hofmann	1	0	0	1
10	DF	26	(Poland)	Łukasz Piszczek	0	1	1	2
11	MF	8	(Germany)	İlkay Gündoğan	1	1	0	2
12	DF	15	(Germany)	Mats Hummels	2	0	0	2
13	MF	22	(United States)	Christian Pulisic	2	0	0	2
14	DF	25	(Greece)	Sokratis Papastathopoulos	1	0	0	1
15	DF	37	(Germany)	Erik Durm	1	0	0	1
	Own Goals				2	0	2	4
	Total				77	17	18	103

Last updated on 22 March 2016 Europa League excludes goal in Europa League Qualification

== Pre-season and friendlies ==
Win Draw Loss

3 July 2015 Friendly	VfL Rhede	0–5	Borussia Dortmund	Rhede
18:30 CEST (UTC+02:00)			Gündoğan 12'; Mkhitaryan 19'; Ioannidis 21'; Stenzel 52'; Maruoka 87'	Attendance: 7,500

4 July 2015 Friendly	Borussia Dortmund	17–0	Team Gold	Dortmund
14:30 CEST (UTC+02:00)	Błaszczykowski 4', 22'; Aubameyang 7', 13', 17'; Kampl 9'; Maruoka 48'; Sebastian Brendel 49'; Hofmann 50', 57', 63'; Reus 51'; Immobile 54', 69', 74'; Stenzel 56'; Castro 59'			Stadium: Westfalenstadion; Attendance: 41,200

7 July 2015 Friendly	Kawasaki Frontale	0–6	Borussia Dortmund	Kawasaki
13:00		Report	Kagawa 5', 36'; Aubameyang 53', 57'; Maruoka 59'; Stanković 80'	Stadium: Todoroki Athletics Stadium

9 July 2015 Friendly	Johor Darul Ta'zim	1–6	Borussia Dortmund	Johor Bahru
15:45 CEST (UTC+02:00)	Steven 40'	Report	Gündoğan 22'; Aubameyang 29'; Kampl 32'; Kagawa 74'; Dudziak 82'; Reus 90'	Stadium: Larkin Stadium

17 July 2015 Friendly	VfL Bochum	2–1	Borussia Dortmund	Bochum
20:00 CEST (UTC+02:00)	Terrazzino 33'; Hoogland 59'	Report	Dudziak 80'	Stadium: Ruhrstadion; Attendance: 28000; Referee: Sören Storks

21 July 2015 Friendly	FC Luzern	1–4	Borussia Dortmund	Lucerne
19:30 CEST (UTC+02:00)	Cirjak 70'	Report	Reus 10'; Kampl 22'; Hummels 51'; Leitner 69'	Stadium: Swissporarena; Attendance: 12258; Referee: Nikolaj Hänni

25 July 2015 Friendly	Borussia Dortmund	2–0	Juventus	St. Gallen
19:05 CEST (UTC+02:00)	Aubameyang 40'; Reus 64'	Report		Stadium: AFG Arena; Referee: A. Jaccottet

1 August 2015 Friendly	Borussia Dortmund	2–0	Real Betis	Wuppertal
15:30 CEST (UTC+02:00)	Ramos 36'; Kirch 85'	Report		Stadium: Stadion am Zoo

== Competitions ==
Win Draw Loss

=== Bundesliga ===
==== League table ====
Pos	Team	Pld	W	D	L	GF	GA	GD	Pts	Qualification or relegation
1	Bayern Munich (C)	34	28	4	2	80	17	+63	88	Qualification for the Champions League group stage
2	Borussia Dortmund	34	24	6	4	82	34	+48	78	Qualification for the Champions League group stage
3	Bayer Leverkusen	34	18	6	10	56	40	+16	60	Qualification for the Champions League group stage
4	Borussia Mönchengladbach	34	17	4	13	67	50	+17	55	Qualification for the Champions League play-off round
5	Schalke 04	34	15	7	12	51	49	+2	52	Qualification for the Europa League group stage (Note: Since the winners of the 2015–16 DFB-Pokal, Bayern Munich, qualified for the Champions League based on league position, the Europa League group stage spot was passed to the sixth-placed team, Mainz 05; and the Europa League third qualifying round spot was passed to the seventh-placed team, Hertha BSC.)

Source: DFB
Rules for classification: 1) Points; 2) Goal difference; 3) Goals scored; 4) Head-to-head points; 5) Head-to-head goal difference; 6) Head-to-head away goals scored; 7) Away goals scored; 8) Play-offs.
(C) Champions

==== Results summary ====
Overall								Home						Away					
Pld	W	D	L	GF	GA	GD	Pts	W	D	L	GF	GA	GD	W	D	L	GF	GA	GD
34	24	6	4	82	34	+48	78	14	3	0	49	14	+35	10	3	4	33	20	+13

Last updated: 14 May 2016.
Source: Bundesliga

==== Results by round ====
Round	1	2	3	4	5	6	7	8	9	10	11	12	13	14	15	16	17	18	19	20	21	22	23	24	25	26	27	28	29	30	31	32	33	34
Ground	H	A	H	A	H	A	H	A	A	H	A	H	A	H	A	H	A	A	H	A	H	A	H	A	H	H	A	H	A	H	A	H	A	H
Result	W	W	W	W	W	D	D	L	W	W	W	W	L	W	W	W	L	W	W	D	W	W	W	W	D	W	W	W	D	W	W	W	L	D
Position	2	1	1	1	1	2	2	2	2	2	2	2	2	2	2	2	2	2	2	2	2	2	2	2	2	2	2	2	2	2	2	2	2	2

Updated to match(es) played on 14 May 2016. Source: Bundesliga
A = Away; H = Home; W = Win; D = Draw; L = Loss

==== Matches ====
15 August 2015 1	Borussia Dortmund	4–0	Borussia Mönchengladbach	Dortmund
18:30 CEST (UTC+02:00)	Reus 15'; Aubameyang 21'; Mkhitaryan 33', 50'	Report	Xhaka (yellow card) 77'	Stadium: Signal Iduna Park; Attendance: 81,359; Referee: Tobias Stieler

23 August 2015 2	FC Ingolstadt	0–4	Borussia Dortmund	Ingolstadt
15:30 CEST (UTC+02:00)	Leckie (yellow card) 25'; Roger (yellow card) 29'	Report	Mkhitaryan (yellow card) 9'; Subotić (yellow card) 31'; Kagawa (yellow card) 37', (goal) 84'; Ginter 55'; Reus 60' (pen.); Aubameyang 90+1'	Stadium: Audi Sportpark; Attendance: 15,000; Referee: Christian Dingert

30 August 2015 3	Borussia Dortmund	3–1	Hertha BSC	Dortmund
15:30 CEST (UTC+02:00)	Hummels 27'; Aubameyang 51'; Ramos 90+3'	Report	Van den Bergh (yellow card) 45'; Weiser (yellow card) 50'; Kalou 78'	Stadium: Signal Iduna Park; Attendance: 80,500; Referee: Guido Winkmann

12 September 2015 4	Hannover 96	2–4	Borussia Dortmund	Hanover
15:30 CEST (UTC+02:00)	Sobiech 18', 53'; Felipe (yellow card) 84'; Zieler (yellow card) 85'; Sané (yellow card) 90+2'	Report	Aubameyang 35' (pen.), 85' (pen.); Mkhitaryan 44'; Hummels (yellow card) 56'; Felipe 67' (o.g.)	Stadium: HDI-Arena; Attendance: 49,000; Referee: Daniel Siebert

20 September 2015 5	Borussia Dortmund	3–0	Bayer Leverkusen	Dortmund
17:30 CEST (UTC+02:00)	Hofmann 19'; Kagawa 58'; Papastathopoulos (yellow card) 61'; Aubameyang 74' (pen.)	Report	Kampl (yellow card) 41'; Papadopoulos (yellow card) 71'; Wendell (yellow card) 73'	Stadium: Signal Iduna Park; Attendance: 81,359; Referee: Deniz Aytekin

23 September 2015 6	1899 Hoffenheim	1–1	Borussia Dortmund	Sinsheim
20:00 CEST (UTC+02:00)	Bičakčić (yellow card) 9'; Rudy 42'; Volland (yellow card) 82'	Report	Aubameyang 55'; Gündoğan (yellow card) 69'	Stadium: Wirsol Rhein-Neckar-Arena; Attendance: 29,700; Referee: Tobias Welz

27 September 2015 7	Borussia Dortmund	2–2	Darmstadt 98	Dortmund
17:30 CEST (UTC+02:00)	Aubameyang 63', 71'	Report	Heller 17', (yellow card) 54'; Wagner (yellow card) 45+4'; Sulu 90'	Stadium: Signal Iduna Park; Attendance: 81,359; Referee: Robert Hartmann

4 October 2015 8	Bayern Munich	5–1	Borussia Dortmund	Munich
17:30 CEST (UTC+02:00)	Alaba (yellow card) 4'; Müller 26', 35' (pen.); Lewandowski 46', 58'; Götze 66'; Boateng (yellow card) 78'; Kimmich (yellow card) 83'	Report	Aubameyang 37', (yellow card) 80'	Stadium: Allianz Arena; Attendance: 75,000; Referee: Marco Fritz

16 October 2015 9	Mainz 05	0–2	Borussia Dortmund	Mainz
20:30 CEST (UTC+02:00)	Jairo (yellow card) 59'; Brosinski (yellow card) 68'	Report	Mkhitaryan (yellow card) 10', (goal) 82'; Reus 18'	Stadium: Coface Arena; Attendance: 34,000; Referee: Tobias Stieler

25 October 2015 10	Borussia Dortmund	5–1	FC Augsburg	Dortmund
15:30 CET (UTC+01:00)	Aubameyang 18', 85', 90+1'; Reus 21', 33'	Report	Bobadilla 49'; Werner (yellow card) 60'; Feulner (yellow card) 73'	Stadium: Signal Iduna Park; Attendance: 81,359; Referee: Manuel Gräfe

31 October 2015 11	Werder Bremen	1–3	Borussia Dortmund	Bremen
15:30 CET (UTC+01:00)	Ujah 32'; Sternberg (yellow card) 55'; Fritz (yellow card) 60'; Gálvez (yellow card) 64'	Report	Reus 9', 72'; Mkhitaryan 44'	Stadium: Weserstadion; Attendance: 42,100; Referee: Tobias Welz

8 November 2015 12	Borussia Dortmund	3–2	Schalke 04	Dortmund
15:30 CET (UTC+01:00)	Kagawa 30'; Ginter 43'; Aubameyang 47', (yellow card) 48'; Schmelzer (yellow card) 82'; Weigl (yellow card) 89'	Report	Huntelaar 33', 71'; Goretzka (yellow card) 38'; Caiçara (yellow card) 46'; Di Santo (yellow card) 60'; Platte (yellow card) 90+1'	Stadium: Signal Iduna Park; Attendance: 79,956; Referee: Felix Brych

20 November 2015 13	Hamburger SV	3–1	Borussia Dortmund	Hamburg
20:45 CET (UTC+01:00)	Lasogga 19' (pen.); Holtby 41'; Hummels 55' (o.g.)	Report	Bürki (yellow card) 19'; Aubameyang 86'	Stadium: Volksparkstadion; Attendance: 57,000; Referee: Felix Zwayer

29 November 2015 14	Borussia Dortmund	4–1	VfB Stuttgart	Dortmund
15:30 CET (UTC+01:00)	Castro 3'; Aubameyang 19', 90+1'; Papastathopoulos (yellow card) 53'; Niedermeier 65' (o.g.)	Report	Didavi 40'	Stadium: Signal Iduna Park; Attendance: 81,359; Referee: Manuel Gräfe

5 December 2015 15	VfL Wolfsburg	1–2	Borussia Dortmund	Wolfsburg
18:30 CET (UTC+01:00)	Arnold (yellow card) 46'; Vieirinha (yellow card) 54'; Träsch (yellow card) 81'; R. Rodríguez 90+1' (pen.)	Report	Reus 32', (yellow card) 44'; Piszczek (yellow card) 90'; Kagawa 90+3'	Stadium: Volkswagen Arena; Attendance: 30,000; Referee: Tobias Stieler

13 December 2015 16	Borussia Dortmund	4–1	Eintracht Frankfurt	Dortmund
17:30 CET (UTC+01:00)	Mkhitaryan 24'; Aubameyang 57'; Hummels 61'; Ramos 86'	Report	Meier 6'; Medojević (yellow card) 28' (yellow-red card) 44'	Stadium: Signal Iduna Park; Attendance: 81,359; Referee: Christian Dingert

19 December 2015 17	1. FC Köln	2–1	Borussia Dortmund	Cologne
15:30 CET (UTC+01:00)	Lehmann (yellow card) 72'; Zoller 82', (yellow card) 83'; Modeste 90', (yellow card) 90+1'	Report	Papastathopoulos 18'; Aubameyang (yellow card) 67'	Stadium: RheinEnergieSTADION; Attendance: 50,000; Referee: Knut Kircher

23 January 2016 18	Borussia Mönchengladbach	1–3	Borussia Dortmund	Mönchengladbach
18:30 CET (UTC+01:00)	Raffael 58'; Elvedi (yellow card) 67'	Report	Reus 41'; Mkhitaryan 50'; Weigl (yellow card) 74'; Gündoğan 75'	Stadium: Stadion im Borussia-Park; Attendance: 54,010; Referee: Felix Brych

30 January 2016 19	Borussia Dortmund	2–0	FC Ingolstadt	Dortmund
15:30 CET (UTC+01:00)	Weigl (yellow card) 28'; Papastathopoulos (yellow card) 61'; Piszczek (yellow card) 71'; Aubameyang 77', 86'; Mkhitaryan (yellow card) 81'	Report	Bauer (yellow card) 26'; Morales (yellow card) 75'	Stadium: Signal Iduna Park; Attendance: 81,359; Referee: Guido Winkmann

6 February 2016 20	Hertha BSC	0–0	Borussia Dortmund	Berlin
15:30 CET (UTC+01:00)		Report	Weigl (yellow card) 9'; Piszczek (yellow card) 41'	Stadium: Olympiastadion; Attendance: 74,244; Referee: Marco Fritz

13 February 2016 21	Borussia Dortmund	1–0	Hannover 96	Dortmund
15:30 CET (UTC+01:00)	Mkhitaryan 57'; Kagawa (yellow card) 69'	Report	Prib (yellow card) 36'	Stadium: Signal Iduna Park; Attendance: 80,900; Referee: Günter Perl

21 February 2016 22	Bayer Leverkusen	0–1	Borussia Dortmund	Leverkusen
15:30 CET (UTC+01:00)	Kampl (yellow card) 25'; Hernández (yellow card) 53'; Papadopoulos (yellow card) 56'; Bellarabi (yellow card) 58'; Wendell (yellow card) 89'	Report	Aubameyang 64'; Durm (yellow card) 87'	Stadium: BayArena; Attendance: 30,210; Referee: Felix Zwayer

28 February 2016 23	Borussia Dortmund	3–1	1899 Hoffenheim	Dortmund
17:30 CET (UTC+01:00)	Mkhitaryan 80'; Ramos 85'; Aubameyang 90+2'	Report	Rudy 25', (red card) 58'	Stadium: Signal Iduna Park; Attendance: 81,359; Referee: Peter Sippel

2 March 2016 24	Darmstadt 98	0–2	Borussia Dortmund	Darmstadt
20:00 CET (UTC+01:00)		Report	Ramos 38'; Durm 53'; Subotić (yellow card) 81'	Stadium: Merck-Stadion am Böllenfalltor; Attendance: 17,000; Referee: Manuel Gräfe

5 March 2016 25	Borussia Dortmund	0–0	Bayern Munich	Dortmund
18:30 CET (UTC+01:00)	Bender (yellow card) 37'	Report	Alonso (yellow card) 22'	Stadium: Signal Iduna Park; Attendance: 81,359; Referee: Tobias Stieler

13 March 2016 26	Borussia Dortmund	2–0	Mainz 05	Dortmund
17:30 CET (UTC+01:00)	Reus 30'; Kagawa 73'	Report		Stadium: Signal Iduna Park; Attendance: 81,000; Referee: Deniz Aytekin

20 March 2016 27	FC Augsburg	1–3	Borussia Dortmund	Augsburg
17:30 CET (UTC+01:00)	Finnbogason 16'; Caiuby (yellow card) 33'; Gouweleeuw (yellow card) 87'; Kohr (yellow card) 88'; Klavan (yellow card) 90+2'	Report	Mkhitaryan (yellow card) 24', (goal) 45'; Castro 69'; Ramos 75'	Stadium: WWK ARENA; Attendance: 30,660; Referee: Christian Dingert

2 April 2016 28	Borussia Dortmund	3–2	Werder Bremen	Dortmund
18:30 CEST (UTC+02:00)	Aubameyang 53'; Kagawa 77'; Ramos 82'; Castro (yellow card) 90+1'	Report	S. García (yellow card) 15'; Yatabaré (yellow card) 50'; Gálvez (yellow card) 53', (goal) 69'; Junuzović 74'	Stadium: Signal Iduna Park; Attendance: 81,359; Referee: Tobias Welz

10 April 2016 29	Schalke 04	2–2	Borussia Dortmund	Gelsenkirchen
15:30 CEST (UTC+02:00)	Kolašinac (yellow card) 45'; Sané 51'; Riether (yellow card) 52'; Huntelaar 66' (pen.); Højbjerg (yellow card) 71'; Belhanda (yellow card) 81'; Neustädter (yellow card) 87'	Report	Şahin (yellow card) 31'; Kagawa 49'; Ginter 56'; Papastathopoulos (yellow card) 64'; Durm (yellow card) 72'	Stadium: Veltins-Arena; Attendance: 61,670; Referee: Felix Zwayer

17 April 2016 30	Borussia Dortmund	3–0	Hamburger SV	Dortmund
15:30 CEST (UTC+02:00)	Pulisic 38'; Ramos 44', 86'	Report	Adler (red card) 52'	Stadium: Signal Iduna Park; Attendance: 81,359; Referee: Marco Fritz

23 April 2016 31	VfB Stuttgart	0–3	Borussia Dortmund	Stuttgart
15:30 CEST (UTC+02:00)		Report	Kagawa 21'; Pulisic 45', (yellow card) 49'; Mkhitaryan 56'	Stadium: Mercedes-Benz Arena; Attendance: 60,000; Referee: Daniel Siebert

30 April 2016 32	Borussia Dortmund	5–1	VfL Wolfsburg	Dortmund
15:30 CEST (UTC+02:00)	Kagawa 7'; Ramos 9'; Weigl (yellow card) 44'; Reus (yellow card) 53', (goal) 59'; Aubameyang 77', 78'	Report	Schürrle 86'	Stadium: Signal Iduna Park; Attendance: 81,359; Referee: Robert Hartmann

7 May 2016 33	Eintracht Frankfurt	1–0	Borussia Dortmund	Frankfurt
15:30 CEST (UTC+02:00)	Aigner 14', (yellow card) 80'; Huszti (yellow card) 38'; Chandler (yellow card) 73'; Djakpa (yellow card) 76'; Stendera (yellow card) 85'	Report	Aubameyang (yellow card) 15'; Mkhitaryan (yellow card) 43'; Schmelzer (yellow card) 73'	Stadium: Commerzbank-Arena; Attendance: 51,500; Referee: Daniel Siebert

14 May 2016 34	Borussia Dortmund	2–2	1. FC Köln	Dortmund
15:30 CEST (UTC+02:00)	Castro 11'; Papastathopoulos (yellow card) 45'; Reus 75'	Report	Modeste 27'; Jojić 43'	Stadium: Signal Iduna Park; Attendance: 81,359; Referee: Michael Weiner

=== DFB-Pokal ===
9 August 2015 Round 1	Chemnitzer FC	0–2	Borussia Dortmund	Chemnitz
14:30 CEST (UTC+02:00)	Danneberg (yellow card) 62'	Report	Aubameyang 25'; Piszczek (yellow card) 77'; Mkhitaryan 82'	Stadium: Stadion an der Gellertstraße; Attendance: 12,500; Referee: Peter Sippel

28 October 2015 Round 2	Borussia Dortmund	7–1	SC Paderborn	Dortmund
19:00 CET (UTC+01:00)	Ramos 25'; Castro 30', 58'; Kagawa 43'; Gündoğan 55' (pen.); Piszczek 87'; Mkhitaryan 89'	Report	Lakić 21'; Wydra (yellow card) 84'	Stadium: Signal Iduna Park; Attendance: 74,605; Referee: Peter Sippel

16 December 2015 Round of 16	FC Augsburg	0–2	Borussia Dortmund	Augsburg
20:30 CET (UTC+01:00)	Kohr (yellow card) 72'	Report	Aubameyang 61'; Mkhitaryan 66'	Stadium: WWK ARENA; Attendance: 30,101; Referee: Manuel Gräfe

9 February 2016 Quarter-finals	VfB Stuttgart	1–3	Borussia Dortmund	Stuttgart
20:30 CET (UTC+01:00)	Rupp 21'; Niedermeier (yellow card) 34'; Großkreutz (yellow card) 46'; Didavi (yellow card) 62'	Report	Reus 5'; Aubameyang 31'; Papastathopoulos (yellow card) 83'; Mkhitaryan 89'	Stadium: Mercedes-Benz Arena; Attendance: 46,500; Referee: Tobias Stieler

20 April 2016 Semi-finals	Hertha BSC	0–3	Borussia Dortmund	Berlin
20:30 CEST (UTC+02:00)	Plattenhardt (yellow card) 72'	Report	Castro 20', (yellow card) 70'; Reus 75'; Mkhitaryan 83'	Stadium: Olympiastadion; Attendance: 76,233; Referee: Deniz Aytekin

21 May 2016 Final	Bayern Munich	0–0 (a.e.t.) (4–3 p)	Borussia Dortmund	Berlin
20:00 CEST (UTC+02:00)	Ribéry (yellow card) 39'; Kimmich (yellow card) 42'; Vidal (yellow card) 47'; Müller (yellow card) 109'	Report	Castro (yellow card) 39'; Hummels (yellow card) 74'; Papastathopoulos (yellow card) 99'	Stadium: Olympiastadion; Attendance: 74,322; Referee: Marco Fritz
	Penalties
	Vidal (penalty scored); Lewandowski (penalty scored); Kimmich (penalty missed); Müller (penalty scored); Douglas Costa (penalty scored)		(penalty scored) Kagawa; (penalty missed) Bender; (penalty missed) Papastathopoulos; (penalty scored) Aubameyang; (penalty scored) Reus

=== UEFA Europa League ===
==== Third qualifying round ====
30 July 2015 First leg	Wolfsberger AC (Austria)	0–1	(Germany) Borussia Dortmund	Klagenfurt, Austria
21:05 CEST (UTC+02:00)	Zündel (yellow card) 48'	Report	Hofmann 14'; Weigl (yellow card) 43'; Hummels (yellow card) 90+1'	Stadium: Wörthersee Stadion; Attendance: 30,250; Referee: Davide Massa (Italy)

6 August 2015 Second leg	Borussia Dortmund (Germany)	5–0 (6–0 agg.)	(Austria) Wolfsberger AC	Dortmund, Germany
20:30 CEST (UTC+02:00)	Reus (yellow card) 35', (goal) 48'; Aubameyang 64'; Mkhitaryan 73', 82', 86'	Report	Jacobo (yellow card) 29'; Sílvio (yellow card) 82'	Stadium: Signal Iduna Park; Attendance: 65,190; Referee: Marius Avram (Romania)

==== Play-off round ====
20 August 2015 First leg	Odd (Norway)	3–4	(Germany) Borussia Dortmund	Skien, Norway
20:30 CEST (UTC+02:00)	Samuelsen 2'; Nordkvelle 20'; Ruud 22'; Oldrup Jensen (yellow card) 42'	Report	Aubameyang 34', 76'; Kagawa 47'; Mkhitaryan 85'	Stadium: Skagerak Arena; Attendance: 12,436; Referee: Jorge Sousa (Portugal)

27 August 2015 Second leg	Borussia Dortmund (Germany)	7–2 (11–5 agg.)	(Norway) Odd	Dortmund, Germany
20:30 CEST (UTC+02:00)	Mkhitaryan 25'; Reus 27', 31', 57'; Kagawa 40', 90'; Gündoğan 51'	Report	Halvorsen 19', (yellow card) 23'; Berg 64'	Stadium: Signal Iduna Park; Attendance: 64,200; Referee: Yevhen Aranovsky (Ukraine)

==== Group stage ====
Pos	Team	Pld	W	D	L	GF	GA	GD	Pts	Qualification	KRA	DOR	PAOK	QAB
1	(Russia) Krasnodar	6	4	1	1	9	4	+5	13	Advance to knockout phase	—	1–0	2–1	2–1
2	(Germany) Borussia Dortmund	6	3	1	2	10	5	+5	10	Advance to knockout phase	2–1	—	0–1	4–0
3	(Greece) PAOK	6	1	4	1	3	3	0	7		0–0	1–1	—	0–0
4	(Azerbaijan) Gabala	6	0	2	4	2	12	−10	2		0–3	1–3	0–0	—

Source: Soccerway
Rules for classification: Group stage tiebreakers

17 September 2015 1	Borussia Dortmund (Germany)	2–1	(Russia) Krasnodar	Dortmund, Germany
19:00 CEST (UTC+02:00)	Ginter 45+1'; Kagawa (yellow card) 80'; Gündoğan (yellow card) 85'; Park 90+2'	Report	Kaboré (yellow card) 8'; Mamayev 12'; Jędrzejczyk (yellow card) 20'; Laborde (yellow card) 73'	Stadium: Signal Iduna Park; Attendance: 55,200; Referee: Liran Liany (Israel)

1 October 2015 2	PAOK (Greece)	1–1	(Germany) Borussia Dortmund	Thessaloniki, Greece
21:05 CEST (UTC+02:00)	Mak 34', (yellow card) 35'; Tzavellas (yellow card) 69'	Report	Mkhitaryan (yellow card) 33'; Weigl (yellow card) 35'; Subotić (yellow card) 52'; Castro 72'	Stadium: Toumba Stadium; Attendance: 25,663; Referee: Anthony Taylor (England)

22 October 2015 3	Gabala (Azerbaijan)	1–3	(Germany) Borussia Dortmund	Baku, Azerbaijan
17:00 CEST (UTC+02:00)	Stanković (yellow card) 68'; Zargarov (yellow card) 86'; Dodô 90+3'	Report	Aubameyang 31', 38', 72'; Papastathopoulos (yellow card) 47'; Bender (yellow card) 83'	Stadium: Bakcell Arena; Attendance: 10,500; Referee: Ivan Bebek (Croatia)

5 November 2015 4	Borussia Dortmund (Germany)	4–0	(Azerbaijan) Gabala	Dortmund, Germany
19:00 CET (UTC+01:00)	Bender (yellow card) 14'; Reus 28'; Aubameyang 45'; Zenjov 67' (o.g.); Mkhitaryan 70'	Report	Vernydub (yellow card) 8'; Meza (yellow card) 71'; Jamalov (yellow card) 86'; Zargarov (yellow card) 90+2'	Stadium: Signal Iduna Park; Attendance: 57,000; Referee: Sébastien Delferière (Belgium)

26 November 2015 5	Krasnodar (Russia)	1–0	(Germany) Borussia Dortmund	Krasnodar, Russia
17:00 CET (UTC+01:00)	Mamayev 2' (pen.); Pereyra (yellow card) 17'; Kaboré (yellow card) 53'; Jędrzejczyk (yellow card) 57'; Ari (yellow card) 90+4'	Report	Hummels (yellow card) 1'	Stadium: Kuban Stadium; Attendance: 30,150; Referee: Serdar Gözübüyük (Netherlands)

10 December 2015 6	Borussia Dortmund (Germany)	0–1	(Greece) PAOK	Dortmund, Germany
19:00 CET (UTC+01:00)	Januzaj (yellow card) 43'	Report	Mak 33'; Konstantinidis (yellow card) 36'	Stadium: Signal Iduna Park; Attendance: 55,200; Referee: Mattias Gestranius (Finland)

==== Knockout phase ====
===== Round of 32 =====
18 February 2016 First leg	Borussia Dortmund (Germany)	2–0	(Portugal) Porto	Dortmund, Germany
19:00 CET (UTC+01:00)	Piszczek 6'; Reus 71'	Report	Varela (yellow card) 58'; José Ángel (yellow card) 62'; Evandro (yellow card) 78'; Suk (yellow card) 90'	Stadium: Signal Iduna Park; Attendance: 65,851; Referee: Luca Banti (Italy)

25 February 2016 Second leg	Porto (Portugal)	0–1 (0–3 agg.)	(Germany) Borussia Dortmund	Porto, Portugal
21:05 CET (UTC+01:00)	Evandro (yellow card) 14'; Neves (yellow card) 56'; Pereira (yellow card) 90'	Report	Casillas 23' (o.g.); Bürki (yellow card) 58'; Şahin (yellow card) 59'	Stadium: Estádio do Dragão; Attendance: 32,707; Referee: Mark Clattenburg (England)

===== Round of 16 =====
10 March 2016 First leg	Borussia Dortmund (Germany)	3–0	(England) Tottenham Hotspur	Dortmund, Germany
19:00 CET (UTC+01:00)	Aubameyang 30'; Reus 61', 70'	Report	Carroll (yellow card) 35'; Lamela (yellow card) 67'	Stadium: Signal Iduna Park; Attendance: 65,848; Referee: Cüneyt Çakır (Turkey)

17 March 2016 Second leg	Tottenham Hotspur (England)	1–2 (1–5 agg.)	(Germany) Borussia Dortmund	London, England
21:05 CET (UTC+01:00)	Lamela (yellow card) 26'; Son 73'; Alderweireld (yellow card) 79'	Report	Aubameyang 24', 70'; Castro (yellow card) 65'	Stadium: White Hart Lane; Attendance: 34,593; Referee: Nicola Rizzoli (Italy)

===== Quarter-finals =====
7 April 2016 First leg	Borussia Dortmund (Germany)	1–1	(England) Liverpool	Dortmund, Germany
21:05 CEST (UTC+02:00)	Weidenfeller (yellow card) 45+5'; Hummels 48'; Reus (yellow card) 52'; Papastathopoulos (yellow card) 81'	Report	Can (yellow card) 9'; Origi 36'; Lallana (yellow card) 44'	Stadium: Signal Iduna Park; Attendance: 65,848; Referee: Carlos Velasco Carballo (Spain)

14 April 2016 Second leg	Liverpool (England)	4–3 (5–4 agg.)	(Germany) Borussia Dortmund	Liverpool, England
21:05 CEST (UTC+02:00)	Origi 48'; Coutinho 66'; Sakho 77', (yellow card) 90+2'; Lovren 90+1'	Report	Mkhitaryan 5'; Aubameyang 9'; Hummels (yellow card) 53'; Reus 57'; Piszczek (yellow card) 75'; Schmelzer (yellow card) 90+1'	Stadium: Anfield; Attendance: 42,984; Referee: Cüneyt Çakır (Turkey)

== Summary ==
Games played	54 (34Bundesliga) (4 DFB-Pokal) (16 Europa League)
Games won	39 (24 Bundesliga) (4 DFB-Pokal) (11 Europa League)
Games drawn	8 (6 Bundesliga) (2 Europa League)
Games lost	7 (4 Bundesliga) (3 Europa League)
Goals scored	140 (82 Bundesliga) (17 DFB-Pokal) (39 Europa League)
Goals conceded	54 (34 Bundesliga) (2 DFB-Pokal) (16 Europa League)
Goal difference	+86 (+48 Bundesliga) (+15 DFB-Pokal ) (+23 Europa League)
Clean sheets	20 (11 Bundesliga) (2 DFB-Pokal) (7 Europa League)
Yellow cards	44
Red cards	0
Top scorer	39 (Gabon) Pierre-Emerick Aubameyang
Winning Percentage	Overall: 39/54 (72.22%)
