= Durm =

Durm may refer to:

- Durham, North Carolina, United States
- Erik Durm (born 1992), German footballer
