= Oliver Kirch =

German footballer (born 1982)

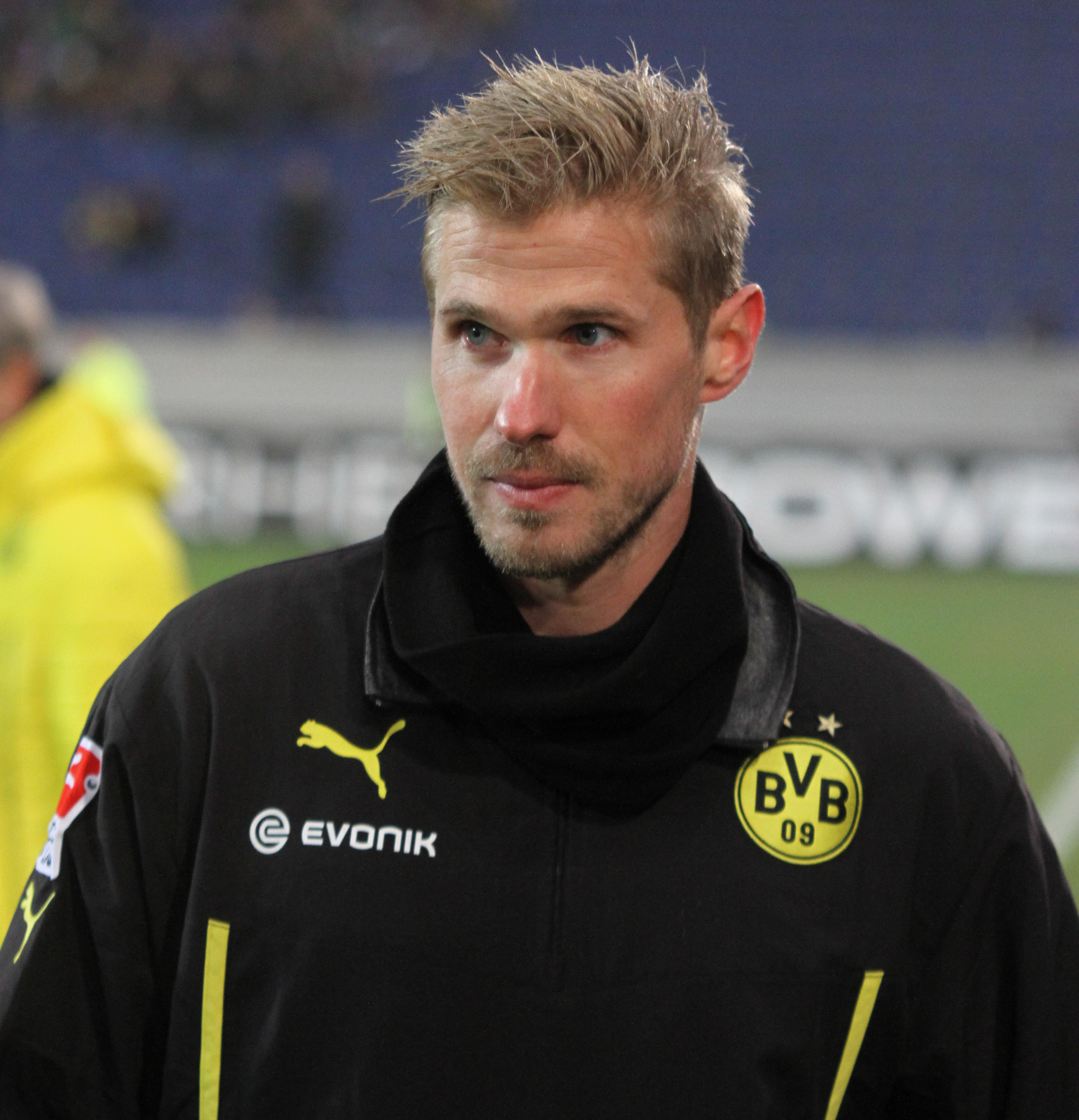
- Kirch in 2014

Personal information
- Full name: Oliver Kirch
- Date of birth: 21 August 1982 (age 44)
- Place of birth: Soest, West Germany
- Height: 1.82 m (6 ft 0 in)
- Positions: Midfielder; right back

Team information
- Current team: Arminia Bielefeld (manager)

Youth career
- 1992–1993: SuS Legden
- 1993–1996: SuS Stadtlohn
- 1996–2000: SpVgg Vreden

Senior career*
Years	Team	Apps	(Gls)
2000–2002	SpVgg Vreden	35	(5)
2002–2003	SC Verl	32	(3)
2003–2007	Borussia Mönchengladbach	22	(0)
2007–2010	Arminia Bielefeld	71	(7)
2010–2012	1. FC Kaiserslautern	52	(1)
2012–2013	Borussia Dortmund II	6	(0)
2012–2015	Borussia Dortmund	24	(1)
2015–2016	SC Paderborn	7	(0)
Total		249	(17)

Managerial career
- 2026–: Arminia Bielefeld
- * Club domestic league appearances and goals

Oliver Kirch (German pronunciation: [ˈɔlivɐ ˈkɪʁç]; born 21 August 1982) is a German retired footballer who played as a midfielder or right-back and current manager of Arminia Bielefeld.

== Club career ==
Kirch started playing football at age five and was enrolled at the academy of SuS Legden in 1992; spending nine years as an academy player. Kirch would go on to join the academy of SuS Stadtlohn and then the academy of SpVgg Vreden. Kirch made his senior professional debut playing for SC Verl in the 2002–03 season before joining Borussia Mönchengladbach in the 2003–04 season, where Kirch made eight appearances in his first professional season. In the 2007–08 Bundesliga season, Kirch left Borussia Mönchengladbach and moved to Arminia Bielefeld and in his first match, he scored his first Bundesliga goal.

Kirch joined 1. FC Kaiserslautern in the 2010–11 Bundesliga season, where he signed a three-year contract. On 21 April 2012, during the 32nd matchday of the 2010–11 Bundesliga season, Kirch scored his first goal of the season in Kaiserslautern's 2–1 away victory over Hertha BSC.

Kirch joined Borussia Dortmund in the 2012–13 Bundesliga season. He signed a two-year contract with the German champions Borussia Dortmund until 30 June 2014. He scored his first Bundesliga goal for Borussia Dortmund on match day 32 in a 2–2 draw against Bayer 04 Leverkusen. Afterwards, Kirch joined SC Paderborn 07 in the 2015–16 season, he signed a two-year contract. In July 2016, Kirch decided to end his career.

== Personal life ==
Kirch and fiancée Jana Flötotto were married in 2011; the civil marriage took place in December 2011 in Central Park in New York City, with the ecclesiastical taking place at the end of May 2012 at the Gütersloh Apostles Church in Gütersloh, North Rhine-Westphalia.

== Career statistics ==
Appearances and goals by club, season and competition
Club	Season	League			DFB-Pokal		Europe		Other		Total	
Club	Season	Division	Apps	Goals	Apps	Goals	Apps	Goals	Apps	Goals	Apps	Goals
SC Verl	2002–03	Regionalliga West	32	3	0	0	—		—		32	3
Borussia Mönchengladbach	2003–04	Bundesliga	8	0	1	0	—		—		9	0
Borussia Mönchengladbach	2004–05	Bundesliga	0	0	0	0	—		—		0	0
Borussia Mönchengladbach	2005–06	Bundesliga	0	0	0	0	—		—		0	0
Borussia Mönchengladbach	2006–07	Bundesliga	14	0	0	0	—		—		14	0
Borussia Mönchengladbach	Total		22	0	1	0	—		—		23	0
Arminia Bielefeld	2007–08	Bundesliga	25	3	3	0	—		—		28	3
Arminia Bielefeld	2008–09	Bundesliga	26	0	2	0	—		—		28	0
Arminia Bielefeld	2009–10	2. Bundesliga	20	4	1	0	—		—		21	4
Arminia Bielefeld	Total		71	7	6	0	—		—		77	7
1. FC Kaiserslautern	2010–11	Bundesliga	29	0	4	0	—		—		33	0
1. FC Kaiserslautern	2011–12	Bundesliga	23	1	3	0	—		—		26	1
1. FC Kaiserslautern	Total		52	1	7	0	—		—		59	1
Borussia Dortmund	2012–13	Bundesliga	4	0	0	0	2 (Note: Appearance(s) in UEFA Champions League)	0	0	0	6	0
Borussia Dortmund	2013–14	Bundesliga	8	1	3	0	1	0	0	0	12	1
Borussia Dortmund	2014–15	Bundesliga	6	0	2	0	3	0	1 (Note: Appearance(s) in DFL-Supercup)	0	12	0
Borussia Dortmund	Total		18	1	5	0	6	0	1	0	30	1
Borussia Dortmund II	2012–13	3. Liga	4	0	—		—		—		4	0
Borussia Dortmund II	2013–14	3. Liga	2	0	—		—		—		2	0
Borussia Dortmund II	Total		6	0	—		—		—		6	0
SC Paderborn	2015–16	2. Bundesliga	7	0	0	0	—		—		7	0
Career total			208	11	18	0	6	0	1	0	233	12

== Honours ==
=== Club ===
Borussia Dortmund

- DFL-Supercup: 2013, 2014
- UEFA Champions League Runners-up: 2012–13
