= Erik Durm =

German footballer (born 1992)

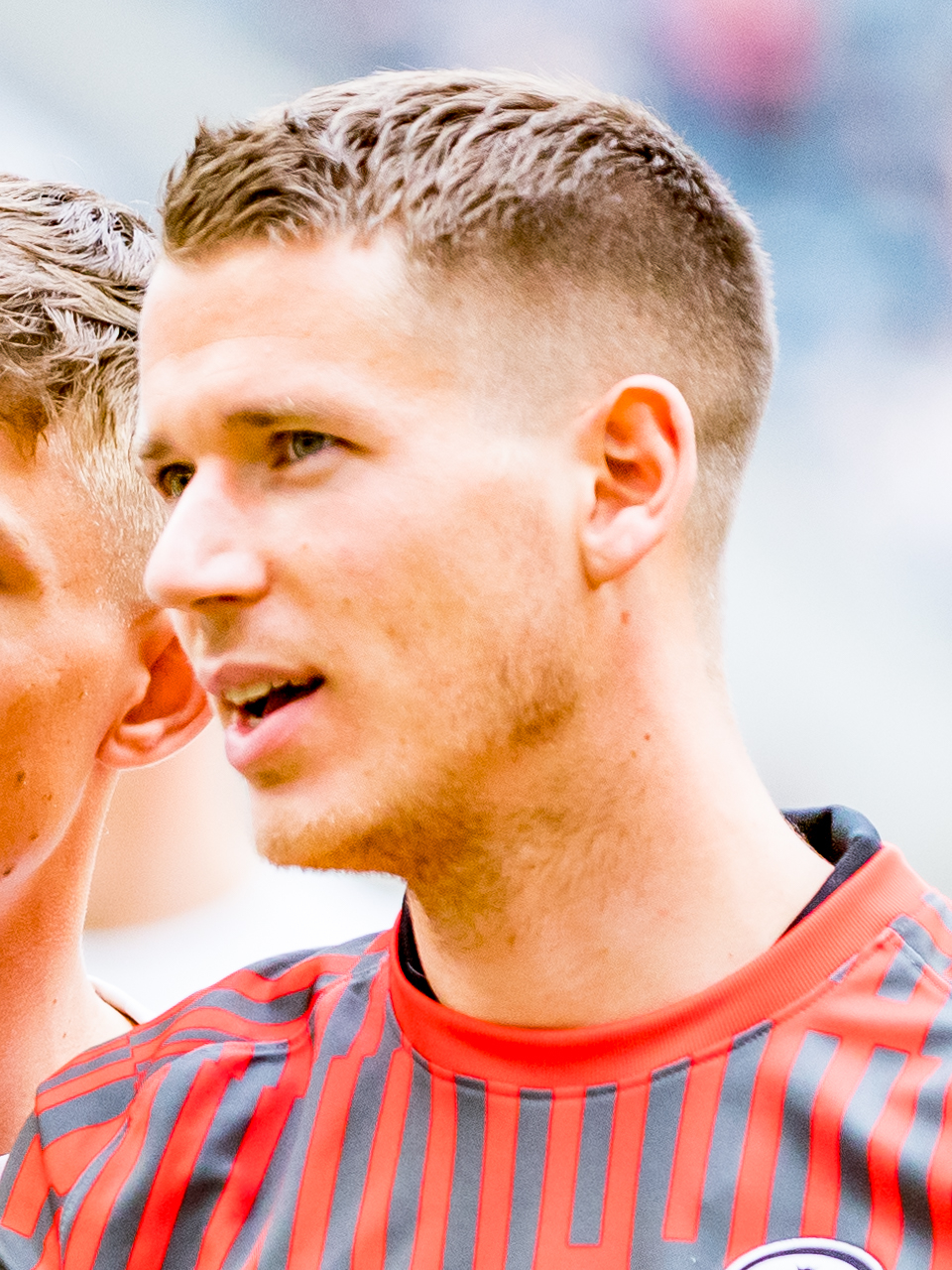
- Durm with Eintracht Frankfurt in 2022

Personal information
- Full name: Erik Durm
- Date of birth: 12 May 1992 (age 34)
- Place of birth: Pirmasens, Germany
- Height: 1.83 m (6 ft 0 in)
- Positions: Right-back; left-back

Youth career
- 1997–2008: SG Rieschweiler
- 2008–2010: Saarbrücken
- 2010–2011: Mainz 05

Senior career*
Years	Team	Apps	(Gls)
2010–2012	Mainz 05 II	33	(13)
2012–2015	Borussia Dortmund II	32	(2)
2013–2018	Borussia Dortmund	64	(2)
2018–2019	Huddersfield Town	28	(0)
2019–2022	Eintracht Frankfurt	37	(1)
2022–2024	1. FC Kaiserslautern	31	(0)
Total		225	(18)

International career
2011	Germany U19	2	(2)
2011	Germany U20	1	(0)
2013–2014	Germany U21	5	(0)
2014	Germany	7	(0)
Medal record
Men's Football
Representing Germany
FIFA World Cup
Winner	2014
- * Club domestic league appearances and goals

Erik Durm (born 12 May 1992) is a German former professional footballer who played as a full-back. He played for Borussia Dortmund, Huddersfield Town, Eintracht Frankfurt and Kaiserslautern. He made his senior debut for the Germany national team in 2014, and later that year was part of their squad that won the World Cup.

== Club career ==
=== Early career ===
Durm began his club career in 1998 at the academy of SG Rieschweiler, before joining the academy of 1. FC Saarbrücken in 2008 where he became youth league top scorer of the 2009–2010 season with 13 goals. In July 2010, Durm was enrolled at the academy of Mainz 05 and won the 2010–11 Youth Federation Cup in Germany and Durm debuted and played his only game of the 2010–11 season for the second team of Mainz 05 on 4 December 2010 against SV Elversberg in the German Regionalliga.

In the 2011–12 season, Durm succeeded to the second team of Mainz 05 and scored seven goals in Mainz 05 II's and his first 10 games. Then Durm went on to score two goals in a 1. FSV Mainz 05 II 3–0 away win on matchday 7 against the second team of Eintracht Frankfurt. Following the scoring of nine goals in the first half of the 2011–12 season, Durm scored four goals in the second half of the 2011–12 season and in January 2012, both Mainz 05 and Borussia Dortmund offered Durm a professional contract, but Durm declined the offer from Mainz 05 to sign with BVB.

=== Borussia Dortmund ===
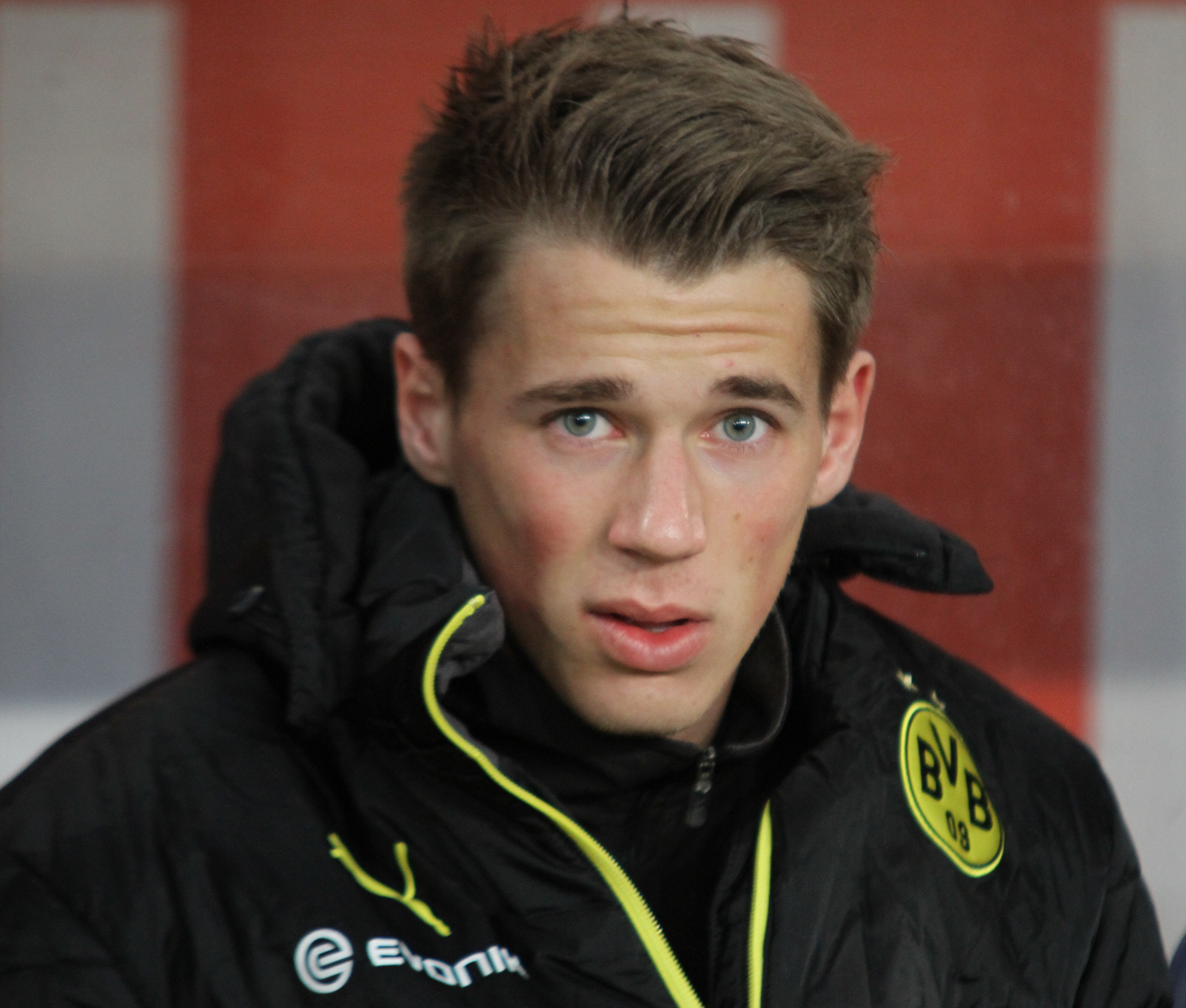
Durm with Borussia Dortmund in 2014

In the 2012–13 season, Durm signed a contract with Borussia Dortmund until June 2014 and Durm was inducted into Borussia Dortmund II competing in the German third league. In the 2012–13 3. Liga season, on 21 July 2012, Durm made his professional football debut in a game for Borussia Dortmund II against VfL Osnabrück. On 18 May 2013, Durm featured in the 38th and last matchday in a 1–0 away win over the second team of VfB Stuttgart.

In the 2013–14 Bundesliga season, Durm was inducted into Borussia Dortmund's first team and, on 10 August 2013, debuted for BVB in the Bundesliga; coming on in the 87th minute for Robert Lewandowski as a substitute in BVB's 4–0 win over FC Augsburg. Durm debuted in the UEFA Champions League on 1 October 2013 in a 3–0 victory over French club Olympique Marseille.

At the start of the 2014–15 season, Durm came on as a substitute in the 2014 DFL-Supercup. He scored his first Bundesliga goal in a 2–0 victory over Hertha Berlin on 9 May 2015.

=== Huddersfield Town ===
On 13 July 2018, it was announced that Durm had completed a transfer to Premier League side Huddersfield Town for an undisclosed fee. Durm signed a one-year contract, with the club having the option to extend for a further year.

=== Eintracht Frankfurt ===
On 3 July 2019, Durm joined Bundesliga club Eintracht Frankfurt on a four-year contract, with whom he'd win the Europa League in 2022, his final season at the club.

=== 1. FC Kaiserslautern ===
On 22 June 2022, Durm moved to 1. FC Kaiserslautern.

On 24 January 2024, Durm announced he had agreed the termination of his contract with Kaiserslautern citing injury problems and lack of playing time and would retire from playing with immediate effect, thus missing the DFB-Pokal final at the end of the season.

== International career ==
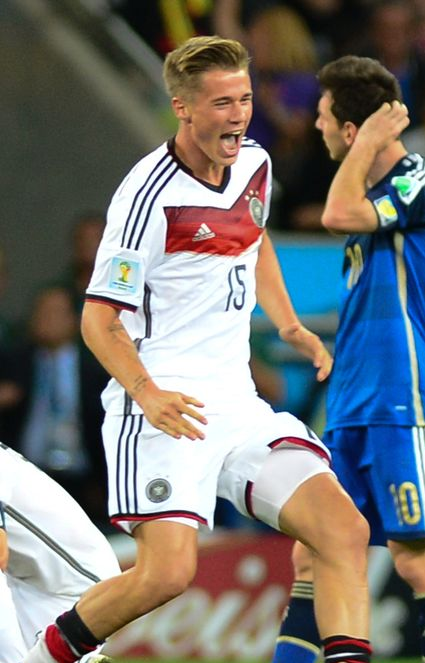
Durm celebrating Germany's win at the 2014 World Cup final

=== Youth ===
Durm played in 2011 for both the German under-19 team and the German under-20 team; and he debuted for the under-19 team on 31 May 2011 in a 3–0 victory against Hungary, and scored two goals. On 12 November 2011, Durm debuted for the German under-20 team against Poland. Durm debuted for the German under-21 team on 13 August 2013, in a 0–0 draw against France.

=== Senior ===
On 1 June 2014, Durm debuted for the German senior team in a 2–2 draw against Cameroon at the Borussia-Park in Mönchengladbach. He played 85 minutes before being substituted for Benedikt Höwedes. The following day, he was named in Germany's squad for the 2014 FIFA World Cup. The team won the tournament with Durm as an unused substitute for all of the games.

== Career statistics ==
=== Club ===
Appearances and goals by club, season and competition
Club	Season	League			Cup		Continental		Other		Total	
Club	Season	Division	Apps	Goals	Apps	Goals	Apps	Goals	Apps	Goals	Apps	Goals
Mainz 05 II	2010–11	Regionalliga West	1	0	—		—		—		1	0
Mainz 05 II	2011–12	Regionalliga West	32	13	—		—		—		32	13
Mainz 05 II	Total		33	13	—		—		—		33	13
Borussia Dortmund II	2012–13	3. Liga	28	2	—		—		—		28	2
Borussia Dortmund II	2013–14	3. Liga	2	0	—		—		—		2	0
Borussia Dortmund II	2014–15	3. Liga	2	0	—		—		—		2	0
Borussia Dortmund II	Total		32	2	—		—		—		32	2
Borussia Dortmund	2013–14	Bundesliga	19	0	3	0	7 (Note: Appearance(s) in UEFA Champions League)	0	0	0	29	0
Borussia Dortmund	2014–15	Bundesliga	18	1	4	0	5	0	1 (Note: Appearance in DFL-Supercup)	0	28	1
Borussia Dortmund	2015–16	Bundesliga	14	1	3	0	3 (Note: Appearance(s) in UEFA Europa League)	0	—		20	1
Borussia Dortmund	2016–17	Bundesliga	13	0	3	0	4	0	0	0	20	0
Borussia Dortmund	2017–18	Bundesliga	0	0	0	0	0	0	0	0	0	0
Borussia Dortmund	Total		64	2	13	0	19	0	1	0	97	2
Huddersfield Town	2018–19	Premier League	28	0	1	0	—		1 (Note: Appearance(s) in EFL Cup)	0	30	0
Eintracht Frankfurt	2019–20	Bundesliga	9	0	2	0	4	0	—		15	0
Eintracht Frankfurt	2020–21	Bundesliga	21	1	1	0	—		—		22	1
Eintracht Frankfurt	2021–22	Bundesliga	7	0	0	0	2	0	—		9	0
Eintracht Frankfurt	Total		37	1	3	0	6	0	—		46	1
1. FC Kaiserslautern	2022–23	2. Bundesliga	27	0	1	0	—		—		28	0
1. FC Kaiserslautern	2023–24	2. Bundesliga	4	0	2	0	—		—		6	0
1. FC Kaiserslautern	Total		31	0	3	0	0	0	—		34	0
Career total			225	18	20	0	25	0	2	0	272	18

=== International ===
Appearances and goals by national team and year
National team	Year	Apps	Goals
Germany	2014	7	0
Total		7	0

== Honours ==
Borussia Dortmund

- DFB-Pokal: 2017
- DFL-Supercup: 2013, 2014

Eintracht Frankfurt

- UEFA Europa League: 2022

1. FC Kaiserslautern

- DFB-Pokal runner-up: 2024

Germany

- FIFA World Cup: 2014
