= 2014–15 Borussia Dortmund season =

106th season in existence of Borussia Dortmund

Borussia Dortmund
2014–15 season
- President: Reinhard Rauball
- Head coach: Jürgen Klopp
- Stadium: Westfalenstadion
- Bundesliga: 7th
- DFB-Pokal: Runners-up
- DFL-Supercup: Winners
- UEFA Champions League: Round of 16
- Top goalscorer: League: Pierre-Emerick Aubameyang (16); All: Pierre-Emerick Aubameyang (23)
Home colours	Away colours	Third colours

The 2014–15 Borussia Dortmund season was the 106th season in the club's football history. In 2014–15, the club played in the Bundesliga, the top tier of German football. It was the club's 39th consecutive season in this league, having been promoted from the 2. Bundesliga in 1976. Dortmund also contested the DFB-Pokal and the UEFA Champions League.

== Players ==
=== First team squad ===
Note: Flags indicate national team as defined under FIFA eligibility rules; some limited exceptions apply. Players may hold more than one non-FIFA nationality.

No.	Pos.	Nation	Player
1	GK	GER	Roman Weidenfeller (vice-captain)
4	DF	SRB	Neven Subotić
5	MF	GER	Sebastian Kehl
6	MF	GER	Sven Bender
7	MF	JPN	Shinji Kagawa
8	MF	GER	İlkay Gündoğan
9	FW	ITA	Ciro Immobile
10	MF	ARM	Henrikh Mkhitaryan
11	FW	GER	Marco Reus (vice-captain)
14	MF	SRB	Miloš Jojić
15	DF	GER	Mats Hummels (captain)
16	MF	POL	Jakub Błaszczykowski
17	FW	GAB	Pierre-Emerick Aubameyang
18	MF	TUR	Nuri Şahin

No.	Pos.	Nation	Player
19	MF	GER	Kevin Großkreutz
20	FW	COL	Adrián Ramos
21	MF	GER	Oliver Kirch
22	GK	AUS	Mitchell Langerak
23	MF	SLO	Kevin Kampl
24	DF	GER	Marian Sarr
25	DF	GRE	Sokratis Papastathopoulos
26	DF	POL	Łukasz Piszczek
28	DF	GER	Matthias Ginter
29	DF	GER	Marcel Schmelzer
33	GK	GER	Zlatan Alomerović
37	DF	GER	Erik Durm
39	GK	GER	Hendrik Bonmann

== Transfers ==
=== In ===
Date	Pos.	Player	Age	Moving from	Fee	Notes
1 July 2014	FW	(South Korea) Ji Dong-won	23	(Germany) FC Augsburg	Free	
1 July 2014	FW	(Colombia) Adrián Ramos	28	(Germany) Hertha BSC	Undisclosed	
1 July 2014	MF	(Turkey) Nuri Şahin	25	(Spain) Real Madrid	Undisclosed	Previously on loan
1 July 2014	FW	(Italy) Ciro Immobile	24	(Italy) Torino	Undisclosed	
17 July 2014	DF	(Germany) Matthias Ginter	20	(Germany) SC Freiburg	Undisclosed	
31 August 2014	MF	(Japan) Shinji Kagawa	25	(England) Manchester United	Undisclosed	
1 January 2015	MF	(Slovenia) Kevin Kampl	24	(Austria) Red Bull Salzburg	Undisclosed	

=== Out ===
Date	Pos.	Player	Age	Moving to	Fee	Notes
30 June 2014	FW	(Poland) Robert Lewandowski	25	(Germany) Bayern Munich	Free	
30 June 2014	DF	(Germany) Manuel Friedrich	34	(India) Mumbai City	Free	
3 July 2014	FW	(Germany) Julian Schieber	25	(Germany) Hertha BSC	Undisclosed	
1 January 2015	FW	(South Korea) Ji Dong-won	23	(Germany) FC Augsburg	Undisclosed	

=== Loan out ===
Date	Pos.	Player	Age	To	Fee	Notes
1 July 2014	FW	(Germany) Marvin Ducksch	20	(Germany) SC Paderborn	Undisclosed	Until 30 June 2015
1 September 2014	MF	(Germany) Jonas Hofmann	22	(Germany) Mainz 05	Undisclosed	Until 30 June 2015
31 January 2015	DF	(Germany) Jannik Bandowski	20	(Germany) 1860 Munich	Undisclosed	Until 30 June 2016

== Friendlies ==
15 July 2014 Friendly	KSV Hessen Kassel	1–4	Borussia Dortmund	Kassel, Germany
18:30 CEST (UTC+02:00)	Lemke 38'	Report	Jordanov 63'; Mkhitaryan 66'; Harder 71'; Kirch 77'	Stadium: Auestadion; Attendance: 17,000

19 July 2014 Friendly	1. FC Heidenheim	3–4	Borussia Dortmund	Heidenheim an der Brenz, Germany
17:00 CEST (UTC+02:00)	Niederlechner 24'; Leipertz 38'; Mayer 66'	Report	Aubameyang 21'; Mkhitaryan 54', 71'; Gyau 86'	Stadium: Voith-Arena; Attendance: 9,000; Referee: Marcel Göpferich (Germany)

22 July 2014 Friendly	VfL Osnabrück	1–1	Borussia Dortmund	Osnabrück, Germany
19:00 CEST (UTC+02:00)	Feldhahn 34' (pen.)	Report	Mkhitaryan 65'	Stadium: Stadion an der Bremer Brücke; Attendance: 13,000; Referee: Aarne Aarnink (Germany)

27 July 2014 Friendly	Rot-Weiss Essen	1–5	Borussia Dortmund	Essen, Germany
17:00 CEST (UTC+02:00)	Soukou 30'	Report	Aubameyang 8', 10'; Subotić 22'; Mkhitaryan 25'; Immobile 30'	Stadium: Stadion Essen; Attendance: 17,000; Referee: Mark Frömel (Germany)

1 August 2014 Friendly	Borussia Dortmund	1–0	Chievo	Altach, Austria
18:30 CEST (UTC+02:00)	Aubameyang 73'	Report		Stadium: Stadion Schnabelholz; Attendance: 7,156; Referee: Robert Schörgenhofer (Austria)

3 August 2014 Friendly	Rapperswil-Jona	0–10	Borussia Dortmund	Rapperswil, Switzerland
17:00 CEST (UTC+02:00)		Report	Aubameyang 2', 15'; Ji 16', 37'; Mkhitaryan 26'; Ramos 39'; Maruoka 52'; Immobile 56', 89'; Hofmann 75' (pen.)	Stadium: Stadion Grünfeld; Attendance: 2,800

6 August 2014 Friendly	Śląsk Wrocław	0–3	Borussia Dortmund	Wrocław, Poland
18:00 CEST (UTC+02:00)		Report	Mkhitaryan 10'; Immobile 20'; Ramos 82'	Stadium: Stadion Miejski; Attendance: 34,200; Referee: Marek Opaliński (Poland)

10 August 2014 Friendly	Liverpool	4–0	Borussia Dortmund	Liverpool, England
13:15 CEST (UTC+02:00)	Sturridge 10'; Lovren 13'; Coutinho 49'; Henderson 61'	Report		Stadium: Anfield; Attendance: 43,980; Referee: Martin Atkinson (England)

26 August 2014 Friendly	Waldhof Mannheim	0–4	Borussia Dortmund	Mannheim, Germany
18:30 CEST (UTC+02:00)		Report	Immobile 32'; Stenzel 70'; Reus 85'; Özbek 86'	Stadium: Carl-Benz-Stadion; Attendance: 21,327; Referee: Markus Schmidt (Germany)

13 January 2015 Friendly	Borussia Dortmund	1–0	Sion	San Pedro del Pinatar, Spain
16:00 CET (UTC+01:00)	Stanković 58'	Report		Stadium: Estadio José Antonio Pérez; Attendance: 1,500; Referee: José Gallego (Spain)

17 January 2015 Friendly	Borussia Dortmund	1–0	Steaua București	Alicante, Spain
16:30 CET (UTC+01:00)	Błaszczykowski 84'	Report		Stadium: Estadio José Rico Pérez; Attendance: 5,000; Referee: Cristian Campo (Spain)

21 January 2015 Friendly	Utrecht	0–1	Borussia Dortmund	Utrecht, Netherlands
19:00 CET (UTC+01:00)		Report	Kampl 17'	Stadium: Stadion Galgenwaard; Attendance: 16,786; Referee: Serdar Gözübüyük (Netherlands)

24 January 2015 Friendly	Fortuna Düsseldorf	1–1	Borussia Dortmund	Düsseldorf, Germany
15:30 CET (UTC+01:00)	Pohjanpalo 41'	Report	Błaszczykowski 81' (pen.)	Stadium: Esprit Arena; Attendance: 23,699; Referee: Sören Storks (Germany)

== Competitions ==
=== Overall ===
Competition	Started round	Final position / round	First match	Last match
Bundesliga	—	7th	23 August 2014	23 May 2015
DFB-Pokal	Round 1	Runners-up	16 August 2014	30 May 2015
DFL-Supercup	Final	Winners	13 August 2014	
UEFA Champions League	Group stage	Round of 16	16 September 2014	18 March 2015

Updated to match played 30 May 2015
Source: Competitions

=== Overview ===
Competition	Record							
Competition	Pld	W	D	L	GF	GA	GD	Win %
Bundesliga	34	13	7	14	47	42	+5	38.24
DFB-Pokal	6	4	1	1	14	7	+7	66.67
DFL-Supercup	1	1	0	0	2	0	+2	100.00
UEFA Champions League	8	4	1	3	15	9	+6	50.00
Total	49	22	9	18	78	58	+20	44.90

Last updated: 30 May 2015
Source: Competitions

=== Bundesliga ===
==== League table ====
Pos	Team	Pld	W	D	L	GF	GA	GD	Pts	Qualification or relegation
5	FC Augsburg	34	15	4	15	43	43	0	49	Qualification for the Europa League group stage (Note: Since the winners of the 2014–15 DFB-Pokal, VfL Wolfsburg, qualified for the Champions League based on league position, the Europa League group stage spot was passed to the sixth-placed team, Schalke 04; and the Europa League third qualifying round spot was passed to the seventh-placed team, Borussia Dortmund.)
6	Schalke 04	34	13	9	12	42	40	+2	48	Qualification for the Europa League group stage
7	Borussia Dortmund	34	13	7	14	47	42	+5	46	Qualification for the Europa League third qualifying round
8	1899 Hoffenheim	34	12	8	14	49	55	−6	44	
9	Eintracht Frankfurt	34	11	10	13	56	62	−6	43	

Source: DFB
Rules for classification: 1) points; 2) goal difference; 3) number of goals scored

==== Results summary ====
Overall								Home						Away					
Pld	W	D	L	GF	GA	GD	Pts	W	D	L	GF	GA	GD	W	D	L	GF	GA	GD
34	13	7	14	47	42	+5	46	9	3	5	26	15	+11	4	4	9	21	27	−6

Last updated: 23 May 2015.
Source: Bundesliga matches

==== Results by round ====
Round	1	2	3	4	5	6	7	8	9	10	11	12	13	14	15	16	17	18	19	20	21	22	23	24	25	26	27	28	29	30	31	32	33	34
Ground	H	A	H	A	H	A	H	A	H	A	H	A	A	H	A	H	A	A	H	A	H	A	H	A	H	A	H	A	H	H	A	H	A	H
Result	L	W	W	L	D	L	L	L	L	L	W	D	L	W	L	D	L	D	L	W	W	W	W	D	D	W	L	L	W	W	D	W	L	W
Position	17	8	4	10	8	12	13	14	15	17	15	16	18	14	16	16	17	18	18	16	15	12	10	10	10	10	10	10	9	8	9	7	7	7

Updated to match(es) played on 23 May 2015. Source: Bundesliga matches
A = Away; H = Home; W = Win; D = Draw; L = Loss

==== Matches ====
23 August 2014 1	Borussia Dortmund	0–2	Bayer Leverkusen	Dortmund
18:30 CEST (UTC+02:00)	Jojić (yellow card) 64'	Report	Bellarabi 1'; Jedvaj (yellow card) 45'; Toprak (yellow card) 51'; Kießling 90+5'	Stadium: Westfalenstadion; Attendance: 80,667; Referee: Deniz Aytekin

29 August 2014 2	FC Augsburg	2–3	Borussia Dortmund	Augsburg
20:30 CEST (UTC+02:00)	Werner (yellow card) 43'; Verhaegh (yellow card) 43'; Bobadilla 82'; Matavž 89'	Report	Reus 11'; Papastathopoulos 14'; Jojić (yellow card) 54'; Subotić (yellow card) 70'; Bender (yellow card) 73'; Ramos 78'	Stadium: SGL arena Attendance: 30,660; Referee: Knut Kircher

13 September 2014 3	Borussia Dortmund	3–1	SC Freiburg	Dortmund
15:30 CEST (UTC+02:00)	Papastathopoulos (yellow card) 19'; Ramos 34'; Kagawa 41'; Aubameyang 78'	Report	Kempf (yellow card) 59'; Krmaš (yellow card) 84'; Frantz (yellow card) 85'; Zulechner (yellow card) 87'; Sorg 90'	Stadium: Westfalenstadion; Attendance: 80,200; Referee: Bastian Dankert

20 September 2014 4	Mainz 05	2–0	Borussia Dortmund	Mainz
18:30 CEST (UTC+02:00)	Okazaki 66', (yellow card) 70'; Ginter 74' (o.g.); Geis (yellow card) 82'	Report	Großkreutz (yellow card) 78'	Stadium: Coface Arena; Attendance: 34,000; Referee: Günter Perl

24 September 2014 5	Borussia Dortmund	2–2	VfB Stuttgart	Dortmund
20:00 CEST (UTC+02:00)	Papastathopoulos (yellow card) 61'; Subotić (yellow card) 81'; Aubameyang 73'; Immobile 86'	Report	Didavi 48', 68'; Romeu (yellow card) 64'; Gentner (yellow card) 85'	Stadium: Westfalenstadion; Attendance: 79,000; Referee: Manuel Gräfe

27 September 2014 6	Schalke 04	2–1	Borussia Dortmund	Gelsenkirchen
15:30 CEST (UTC+02:00)	Matip 10', (yellow card) 88'; Choupo-Moting 23'	Report	Aubameyang 26'; Subotić (yellow card) 53'	Stadium: Veltins-Arena; Attendance: 61,153; Referee: Peter Gagelmann

4 October 2014 7	Borussia Dortmund	0–1	Hamburger SV	Dortmund
15:30 CEST (UTC+02:00)	Papastathopoulos (yellow card) 20'; Jojić (yellow card) 62'	Report	Holtby (yellow card) 15'; Lasogga 35'; Müller (yellow card) 51'; Drobný (yellow card) 61'; Ostrzolek (yellow card) 67'	Stadium: Westfalenstadion; Attendance: 80,667; Referee: Felix Zwayer

18 October 2014 8	1. FC Köln	2–1	Borussia Dortmund	Cologne
15:30 CEST (UTC+02:00)	Vogt 40'; Zoller 74'; Lehmann (yellow card) 78'	Report	Mkhitaryan (yellow card) 25'; Hummels (yellow card) 33'; Immobile 48'; Papastathopoulos (yellow card) 72'	Stadium: RheinEnergieStadion; Attendance: 50,000; Referee: Marco Fritz

25 October 2014 9	Borussia Dortmund	0–1	Hannover 96	Dortmund
15:30 CEST (UTC+02:00)	Mkhitaryan (yellow card) 51'; Reus (yellow card) 80'; Gündoğan (yellow card) 80'	Report	Joselu (yellow card) 36'; Schmiedebach (yellow card) 50'; Gülselam (yellow card) 51' (yellow-red card) 89'; Kiyotake 61'; Marcelo (yellow card) 68'; Zieler (yellow card) 90+2'	Stadium: Westfalenstadion; Attendance: 80,667; Referee: Tobias Stieler

1 November 2014 10	Bayern Munich	2–1	Borussia Dortmund	Munich
18:30 CET (UTC+01:00)	Alonso (yellow card) 36'; Lewandowski 72'; Robben 85' (pen.)	Report	Reus 31'; Piszczek (yellow card) 62'; Subotić (yellow card) 85'	Stadium: Allianz Arena; Attendance: 71,000; Referee: Manuel Gräfe

9 November 2014 11	Borussia Dortmund	1–0	Borussia Mönchengladbach	Dortmund
17:30 CET (UTC+01:00)	Kramer 58' (o.g.); Durm (yellow card) 83'; Papastathopoulos (yellow card) 83'; Immobile (yellow card) 90'	Report	Nordtveit (yellow card) 15'; Kramer (yellow card) 66'	Stadium: Westfalenstadion; Attendance: 80,667; Referee: Felix Brych

22 November 2014 12	SC Paderborn	2–2	Borussia Dortmund	Paderborn
15:30 CET (UTC+01:00)	Rupp 60'; Bakalorz (yellow card) 64'; Hartherz (yellow card) 76'; Sağlık 81', (yellow card) 85'	Report	Aubameyang 12', (yellow card) 84'; Reus 45+1'	Stadium: Benteler Arena; Attendance: 15,000; Referee: Wolfgang Stark

30 November 2014 13	Eintracht Frankfurt	2–0	Borussia Dortmund	Frankfurt
16:30 CET (UTC+01:00)	Meier 5'; Aigner (yellow card) 66'; Seferovic 78'; Lanig (yellow card) 85'	Report	Ginter (yellow card) 77'; Großkreutz (yellow card) 82'	Stadium: Commerzbank-Arena; Attendance: 51,500; Referee: Peter Gagelmann

5 December 2014 14	Borussia Dortmund	1–0	1899 Hoffenheim	Dortmund
20:30 CET (UTC+01:00)	Gündoğan 17'; Kehl (yellow card) 23'	Report	Süle (yellow card) 26'; Schwegler (yellow card) 63'; Salihović (yellow card) 85'; Polanski (yellow card) 88'	Stadium: Westfalenstadion; Attendance: 80,000; Referee: Felix Zwayer

13 December 2014 15	Hertha BSC	1–0	Borussia Dortmund	Berlin
15:30 CET (UTC+01:00)	Schieber 40'; Brooks (yellow card) 72'; Kraft (yellow card) 87'	Report	Piszczek (yellow card) 53'	Stadium: Olympiastadion; Attendance: 75,254; Referee: Günter Perl

17 December 2014 16	Borussia Dortmund	2–2	VfL Wolfsburg	Dortmund
20:00 CET (UTC+01:00)	Aubameyang 8'; Subotić (yellow card) 74'; Immobile 76'	Report	De Bruyne 29'; Naldo 85'	Stadium: Westfalenstadion; Attendance: 80,467; Referee: Tobias Welz

20 December 2014 17	Werder Bremen	2–1	Borussia Dortmund	Bremen
15:30 CET (UTC+01:00)	Selke 3'; Bartels 62'	Report	Hummels 69'	Stadium: Weserstadion; Attendance: 42,100; Referee: Manuel Gräfe

31 January 2015 18	Bayer Leverkusen	0–0	Borussia Dortmund	Leverkusen
18:30 CET (UTC+01:00)	Drmić (yellow card) 13'	Report	Schmelzer (yellow card) 31'; Kampl (yellow card) 39'	Stadium: BayArena; Attendance: 30,210; Referee: Knut Kircher

4 February 2015 19	Borussia Dortmund	0–1	FC Augsburg	Dortmund
20:00 CET (UTC+01:00)		Report	Werner (yellow card) 23'; Bobadilla 50'; Janker (red card) 64'	Stadium: Westfalenstadion; Attendance: 80,667; Referee: Marco Fritz

7 February 2015 20	SC Freiburg	0–3	Borussia Dortmund	Freiburg im Breisgau
15:30 CET (UTC+01:00)	Frantz (yellow card) 62'	Report	Reus 9'; Piszczek (yellow card) 34'; Kagawa (yellow card) 50'; Aubameyang 56', 72'	Stadium: Dreisamstadion; Attendance: 24,000; Referee: Felix Brych

13 February 2015 21	Borussia Dortmund	4–2	Mainz 05	Dortmund
20:30 CET (UTC+01:00)	Subotić 49'; Reus 55'; Aubameyang 71'; Şahin 78'	Report	Soto 1'; Brosinski (yellow card) 48'; Mallı 56'	Stadium: Westfalenstadion; Attendance: 80,200; Referee: Tobias Stieler

20 February 2015 22	VfB Stuttgart	2–3	Borussia Dortmund	Stuttgart
20:30 CET (UTC+01:00)	Klein 32' (pen.); Dié (yellow card) 84'; Niedermeier 90+1'	Report	Kagawa (yellow card) 8'; Aubameyang 25'; Gündoğan 39'; Piszczek (yellow card) 75'; Reus 89'	Stadium: Mercedes-Benz Arena; Attendance: 60,000; Referee: Deniz Aytekin

28 February 2015 23	Borussia Dortmund	3–0	Schalke 04	Dortmund
15:30 CET (UTC+01:00)	Schmelzer (yellow card) 76'; Aubameyang 78', (yellow card) 79'; Mkhitaryan 79'; Reus 86'	Report	Höwedes (yellow card) 44'; Höger (yellow card) 75'	Stadium: Westfalenstadion; Attendance: 79,500; Referee: Felix Zwayer

7 March 2015 24	Hamburger SV	0–0	Borussia Dortmund	Hamburg
15:30 CET (UTC+01:00)	Behrami (yellow card) 31'; Müller (yellow card) 41'; Diekmeier (yellow card) 67'; Cléber (yellow card) 73'; Van der Vaart (yellow card) 83'	Report	Mkhitaryan (yellow card) 63'; Subotić (yellow card) 83'	Stadium: Volksparkstadion; Attendance: 57,000; Referee: Peter Gagelmann

14 March 2015 25	Borussia Dortmund	0–0	1. FC Köln	Dortmund
18:30 CET (UTC+01:00)	Aubameyang (yellow card) 71'; Schmelzer (yellow card) 85'	Report		Stadium: Westfalenstadion; Attendance: 80,667; Referee: Markus Schmidt

21 March 2015 26	Hannover 96	2–3	Borussia Dortmund	Hanover
15:30 CET (UTC+01:00)	Stindl 31', 82'; Bittencourt (yellow card) 49' (yellow-red card) 55'; Sané (yellow card) 71'	Report	Aubameyang 19', 61'; Subotić (yellow card) 46'; Kagawa 57'	Stadium: Niedersachsenstadion; Attendance: 49,000; Referee: Felix Brych

4 April 2015 27	Borussia Dortmund	0–1	Bayern Munich	Dortmund
18:30 CEST (UTC+02:00)	Aubameyang (yellow card) 21'; Schmelzer (yellow card) 28'	Report	Schweinsteiger (yellow card) 19'; Lewandowski 36'; Alonso (yellow card) 75'; Rode (yellow card) 90'	Stadium: Westfalenstadion; Attendance: 80,667; Referee: Knut Kircher

11 April 2015 28	Borussia Mönchengladbach	3–1	Borussia Dortmund	Mönchengladbach
15:30 CEST (UTC+02:00)	Wendt 1'; Brouwers (yellow card) 12'; Raffael 32'; Nordtveit 67'	Report	Gündoğan 77'	Stadium: Borussia-Park; Attendance: 54,010; Referee: Manuel Gräfe

18 April 2015 29	Borussia Dortmund	3–0	SC Paderborn	Dortmund
15:30 CEST (UTC+02:00)	Hummels (yellow card) 7'; Mkhitaryan 48'; Aubameyang 55'; Kagawa 80'	Report		Stadium: Westfalenstadion; Attendance: 80,667; Referee: Felix Brych

25 April 2015 30	Borussia Dortmund	2–0	Eintracht Frankfurt	Dortmund
15:30 CEST (UTC+02:00)	Aubameyang 24' (pen.); Bender (yellow card) 27'; Kagawa 32'; Mkhitaryan (yellow card) 42'; Papastathopoulos (yellow card) 46'	Report	Kittel (yellow card) 25'; Zambrano (yellow card) 42'; Madlung (yellow card) 58'	Stadium: Westfalenstadion; Attendance: 80,667; Referee: Michael Weiner

2 May 2015 31	1899 Hoffenheim	1–1	Borussia Dortmund	Sinsheim
15:30 CEST (UTC+02:00)	Firmino (yellow card) 26'; Volland 33'	Report	Hummels 35'; Kehl (yellow card) 48'; Kampl (yellow card) 55'; Durm (yellow card) 72'	Stadium: Rhein-Neckar Arena; Attendance: 30,150; Referee: Jochen Drees

9 May 2015 32	Borussia Dortmund	2–0	Hertha BSC	Dortmund
15:30 CEST (UTC+02:00)	Subotić 9', (yellow card) 54'; Kehl (yellow card) 35'; Durm 47'	Report	Haraguchi (yellow card) 26'; Skjelbred (yellow card) 53'; Lustenberger (yellow card) 76'	Stadium: Westfalenstadion; Attendance: 80,667; Referee: Tobias Stieler

16 May 2015 33	VfL Wolfsburg	2–1	Borussia Dortmund	Wolfsburg
15:30 CEST (UTC+02:00)	Caligiuri 1'; Benaglio (yellow card) 11'; Naldo 49'; Perišić (yellow card) 71'; Arnold (yellow card) 83'; De Bruyne (yellow card) 90+2'	Report	Aubameyang 11' (pen.); Subotić (yellow card) 62'; Gündoğan (yellow card) 72'	Stadium: Volkswagen Arena; Attendance: 30,000; Referee: Marco Fritz

23 May 2015 34	Borussia Dortmund	3–2	Werder Bremen	Dortmund
15:30 CEST (UTC+02:00)	Kagawa 15'; Aubameyang 17'; Mkhitaryan 42'	Report	Öztunalı 26'; Gebre Selassie 85'	Stadium: Westfalenstadion; Attendance: 80,667; Referee: Manuel Gräfe

=== DFB-Pokal ===
16 August 2014 Round 1	Stuttgarter Kickers	1–4	Borussia Dortmund	Stuttgart
15:30 CEST (UTC+02:00)	Edwini-Bonsu 60'	Report	Mkhitaryan 30', (yellow card) 75'; Aubameyang 55', 78'; Ramos (yellow card) 84', (goal) 89'	Stadium: Mercedes-Benz Arena; Attendance: 37,000; Referee: Peter Sippel

28 October 2014 Round 2	FC St. Pauli	0–3	Borussia Dortmund	Hamburg
20:30 CET (UTC+01:00)	Gonther (yellow card) 85'; Maier (yellow card) 85'	Report	Immobile 33'; Reus 44'; Kehl (yellow card) 84'; Kagawa 86'	Stadium: Millerntor-Stadion; Attendance: 29,063; Referee: Günter Perl

3 March 2015 Round 3	Dynamo Dresden	0–2	Borussia Dortmund	Dresden
20:30 CET (UTC+01:00)	Vržogić (yellow card) 49'; Fiél (yellow card) 75'	Report	Immobile 50', 90'; Błaszczykowski (yellow card) 84'	Stadium: Glücksgas Stadium; Attendance: 30,500; Referee: Tobias Welz

7 April 2015 Quarterfinals	Borussia Dortmund	3–2 (a.e.t.)	1899 Hoffenheim	Dortmund
20:30 CEST (UTC+02:00)	Subotić 19'; Aubameyang 57'; Kehl 107', (yellow card) 117'; Błaszczykowski (yellow card) 112'	Report	Volland 21', (yellow card) 89'; Firmino 27', (yellow card) 90+2'; Schipplock (yellow card) 53'; Schwegler (yellow card) 55'; Bičakčić (yellow card) 112'	Stadium: Westfalenstadion; Attendance: 80,667; Referee: Deniz Aytekin

28 April 2015 Semifinals	Bayern Munich	1–1 (a.e.t.) (0–2 p)	Borussia Dortmund	Munich
20:30 CEST (UTC+02:00)	Lewandowski 29'; Rafinha (yellow card) 64'; Alonso (yellow card) 72'; Benatia (yellow card) 113'	Report	Aubameyang 75'; Kampl (yellow card) 90' (yellow-red card) 108'; Papastathopoulos (yellow card) 101'; Langerak (yellow card) 120+5'	Stadium: Allianz Arena; Attendance: 75,000; Referee: Peter Gagelmann
	Penalties
	Lahm (penalty missed); Alonso (penalty missed); Götze (penalty missed); Neuer (penalty missed)		(penalty scored) Gündoğan; (penalty scored) Kehl; (penalty missed) Hummels
See also: Der Klassiker

30 May 2015 Final	Borussia Dortmund	1–3	VfL Wolfsburg	Berlin
20:00 CEST (UTC+02:00)	Aubameyang 5'; Mkhitaryan (yellow card) 61'; Schmelzer (yellow card) 84'	Report	Luiz Gustavo 22'; De Bruyne 33', (yellow card) 88'; Dost 38'; Vieirinha (yellow card) 90+3'	Stadium: Olympiastadion; Attendance: 75,815; Referee: Felix Brych

=== DFL-Supercup ===
13 August 2014 Final	Borussia Dortmund	2–0	Bayern Munich	Dortmund
18:00 CEST (UTC+02:00)	Mkhitaryan 23'; Aubameyang 62'	Report	Højbjerg (yellow card) 45'; Boateng (yellow card) 73'; Lahm (yellow card) 85'	Stadium: Westfalenstadion; Attendance: 80,667; Referee: Peter Gagelmann

=== UEFA Champions League ===
==== Group stage ====
Pos	Team	Pld	W	D	L	GF	GA	GD	Pts	Qualification	DOR	ARS	AND	GAL
1	(Germany) Borussia Dortmund	6	4	1	1	14	4	+10	13	Advance to knockout phase	—	2–0	1–1	4–1
2	(England) Arsenal	6	4	1	1	15	8	+7	13	Advance to knockout phase	2–0	—	3–3	4–1
3	(Belgium) Anderlecht	6	1	3	2	8	10	−2	6	Transfer to Europa League	0–3	1–2	—	2–0
4	(Turkey) Galatasaray	6	0	1	5	4	19	−15	1		0–4	1–4	1–1	—

Source: UEFA
Rules for classification: Group stage tiebreakers

16 September 2014 1	Borussia Dortmund (Germany)	2–0	(England) Arsenal	Dortmund, Germany
20:45 CEST (UTC+02:00)	Mkhitaryan (yellow card) 5'; Immobile 45'; Aubameyang 48'	Report	Özil (yellow card) 54'; Wilshere (yellow card) 88'	Stadium: Westfalenstadion; Attendance: 65,851; Referee: Olegário Benquerença (Portugal)

1 October 2014 2	Anderlecht (Belgium)	0–3	(Germany) Borussia Dortmund	Anderlecht, Belgium
20:45 CEST (UTC+02:00)	Suárez (yellow card) 17'	Report	Immobile 3'; Ramos 69', 79'	Stadium: Constant Vanden Stock Stadium; Attendance: 18,649; Referee: Paolo Tagliavento (Italy)

22 October 2014 3	Galatasaray (Turkey)	0–4	(Germany) Borussia Dortmund	Istanbul, Turkey
20:45 CEST (UTC+02:00)	Sneijder (yellow card) 25'; Kaya (yellow card) 68'	Report	Aubameyang 6', 18'; Reus 41'; Ramos 83'	Stadium: Türk Telekom Arena; Attendance: 36,324; Referee: Antonio Mateu Lahoz (Spain)

4 November 2014 4	Borussia Dortmund (Germany)	4–1	(Turkey) Galatasaray	Dortmund, Germany
20:45 CET (UTC+01:00)	Reus 39'; Papastathopoulos 56'; Immobile 74'; Kaya 85' (o.g.)	Report	İnan (yellow card) 45'; Balta (yellow card) 64' (goal) 70'; Džemaili (yellow card) 90+2'	Stadium: Westfalenstadion; Attendance: 65,851; Referee: Pavel Královec (Czech Republic)

26 November 2014 5	Arsenal (England)	2–0	(Germany) Borussia Dortmund	London, England
20:45 CET (UTC+01:00)	Sanogo 2'; Arteta (yellow card) 15'; Sánchez 57'	Report	Subotić (yellow card) 13'; Piszczek (yellow card) 37'	Stadium: Emirates Stadium; Attendance: 59,902; Referee: Viktor Kassai (Hungary)

9 December 2014 6	Borussia Dortmund (Germany)	1–1	(Belgium) Anderlecht	Dortmund, Germany
20:45 CET (UTC+01:00)	Immobile 58'	Report	Mitrović 84'	Stadium: Westfalenstadion; Attendance: 65,851; Referee: Alberto Undiano Mallenco (Spain)

==== Knockout phase ====
===== Round of 16 =====
24 February 2015 First leg	Juventus (Italy)	2–1	(Germany) Borussia Dortmund	Turin, Italy
20:45 CET (UTC+01:00)	Tevez 13'; Morata 43'; Vidal (yellow card) 48'; Pereyra (yellow card) 79'	Report	Reus 18'	Stadium: Juventus Stadium; Attendance: 41,182; Referee: Antonio Mateu Lahoz (Spain)

18 March 2015 Second leg	Borussia Dortmund (Germany)	0–3 (1–5 agg.)	(Italy) Juventus	Dortmund, Germany
20:45 CET (UTC+01:00)	Reus (yellow card) 73'	Report	Tevez 3', 79'; Morata 70'	Stadium: Westfalenstadion; Attendance: 65,851; Referee: Milorad Mažić (Serbia)

== Statistics ==
=== Appearances and goals ===
No.	Pos	Nat	Player	Total		Bundesliga		DFB-Pokal		Champions League		DFL-Supercup	
No.	Pos	Nat	Player	Apps	Goals	Apps	Goals	Apps	Goals	Apps	Goals	Apps	Goals
Goalkeepers
1	GK	(Germany) GER	Roman Weidenfeller	32	0	25	0	0	0	7	0	0	0
22	GK	(Australia) AUS	Mitchell Langerak	17	0	9	0	6	0	1	0	1	0
33	GK	(Germany) GER	Zlatan Alomerović	0	0	0	0	0	0	0	0	0	0
39	GK	(Germany) GER	Hendrik Bonmann	0	0	0	0	0	0	0	0	0	0
Defenders
4	DF	(Serbia) SRB	Neven Subotić	40	3	24+4	2	5	1	7	0	0	0
15	DF	(Germany) GER	Mats Hummels	32	2	23+1	2	4	0	3+1	0	0	0
25	DF	(Greece) GRE	Sokratis Papastathopoulos	32	2	19+2	1	4	0	6	1	1	0
26	DF	(Poland) POL	Łukasz Piszczek	30	0	19+3	0	1+1	0	5	0	1	0
28	DF	(Germany) GER	Matthias Ginter	20	0	9+5	0	0	0	2+3	0	1	0
29	DF	(Germany) GER	Marcel Schmelzer	33	0	22	0	4	0	6	0	1	0
37	DF	(Germany) GER	Erik Durm	28	1	18	1	5	0	3+1	0	0+1	0
40	MF	(Germany) GER	Jeremy Dudziak	3	0	0+3	0	0	0	0	0	0	0
Midfielders
5	MF	(Germany) GER	Sebastian Kehl	32	1	20+1	0	3+3	1	4	0	1	0
6	MF	(Germany) GER	Sven Bender	32	0	14+6	0	2+3	0	6	0	0+1	0
7	MF	(Japan) JPN	Shinji Kagawa	39	6	23+5	5	5	1	4+1	0	1	0
8	MF	(Germany) GER	İlkay Gündoğan	33	3	22+1	3	4	0	4+2	0	0	0
10	MF	(Armenia) ARM	Henrikh Mkhitaryan	42	5	21+7	3	4+2	1	7	0	1	1
14	MF	(Serbia) SRB	Miloš Jojić	14	0	5+5	0	1+1	0	0+2	0	0	0
16	MF	(Poland) POL	Jakub Błaszczykowski	20	0	6+7	0	3+1	0	0+3	0	0	0
18	MF	(Turkey) TUR	Nuri Şahin	9	1	6+1	1	0	0	2	0	0	0
19	MF	(Germany) GER	Kevin Großkreutz	23	0	12+5	0	1+1	0	4	0	0	0
21	MF	(Germany) GER	Oliver Kirch	12	0	5+1	0	2	0	0+3	0	1	0
23	MF	(Slovenia) SLO	Kevin Kampl	16	0	8+5	0	0+2	0	1	0	0	0
31	MF	(Japan) JPN	Mitsuru Maruoka	1	0	0+1	0	0	0	0	0	0	0
38	MF	(United States) USA	Joe Gyau	1	0	0+1	0	0	0	0	0	0	0
Forwards
9	FW	(Italy) ITA	Ciro Immobile	34	10	9+15	3	2+1	3	5+1	4	1	0
11	FW	(Germany) GER	Marco Reus	29	11	18+2	7	5	1	4	3	0	0
17	FW	(Gabon) GAB	Pierre-Emerick Aubameyang	46	25	31+2	16	4	5	7+1	3	1	1
20	FW	(Colombia) COL	Adrián Ramos	29	6	6+12	2	1+3	1	0+6	3	0+1	0
Players transferred out during the season
7	MF	(Germany) GER	Jonas Hofmann	2	0	0+2	0	0	0	0	0	0	0
-	DF	(Germany) GER	Jannik Bandowski	0	0	0	0	0	0	0	0	0	0
-	FW	(South Korea) KOR	Ji Dong-won	0	0	0	0	0	0	0	0	0	0

Last updated: 30 May 2015
Source: Competitions

=== Goalscorers ===
This includes all competitive matches. The list is sorted by shirt number when total goals are equal.

Rank	Pos	No.	Nat	Name	Bundesliga	DFB-Pokal	DFB-Supercup	UEFA Champions League	Total
1	FW	17	(Gabon)	Pierre-Emerick Aubameyang	16	5	1	3	25
2	MF	11	(Germany)	Marco Reus	7	1	0	3	11
3	FW	9	(Italy)	Ciro Immobile	3	3	0	4	10
4	FW	20	(Colombia)	Adrián Ramos	2	1	0	3	6
4	MF	7	(Japan)	Shinji Kagawa	5	1	0	0	6
6	MF	10	(Armenia)	Henrikh Mkhitaryan	3	1	1	0	5
8	DF	4	(Serbia)	Neven Subotić	2	1	0	0	3
8	MF	8	(Germany)	İlkay Gündoğan	3	0	0	0	3
9	DF	25	(Greece)	Sokratis Papastathopoulos	1	0	0	1	2
9	DF	15	(Germany)	Mats Hummels	2	0	0	0	1
11	MF	18	(Turkey)	Nuri Şahin	1	0	0	0	1
11	MF	5	(Germany)	Sebastian Kehl	0	1	0	0	1
11	DF	37	(Germany)	Erik Durm	1	0	0	0	1
Own goal					1	0	0	1	2
TOTALS					47	10	2	14	73

Last updated on 7 April 2015 ( i.e. including vs Hoffenheim)
