= Sportpark Husterhöhe =

Multi-use stadium in Pirmasens, Germany

Coordinates: 49.2176882°N 7.5963593°E

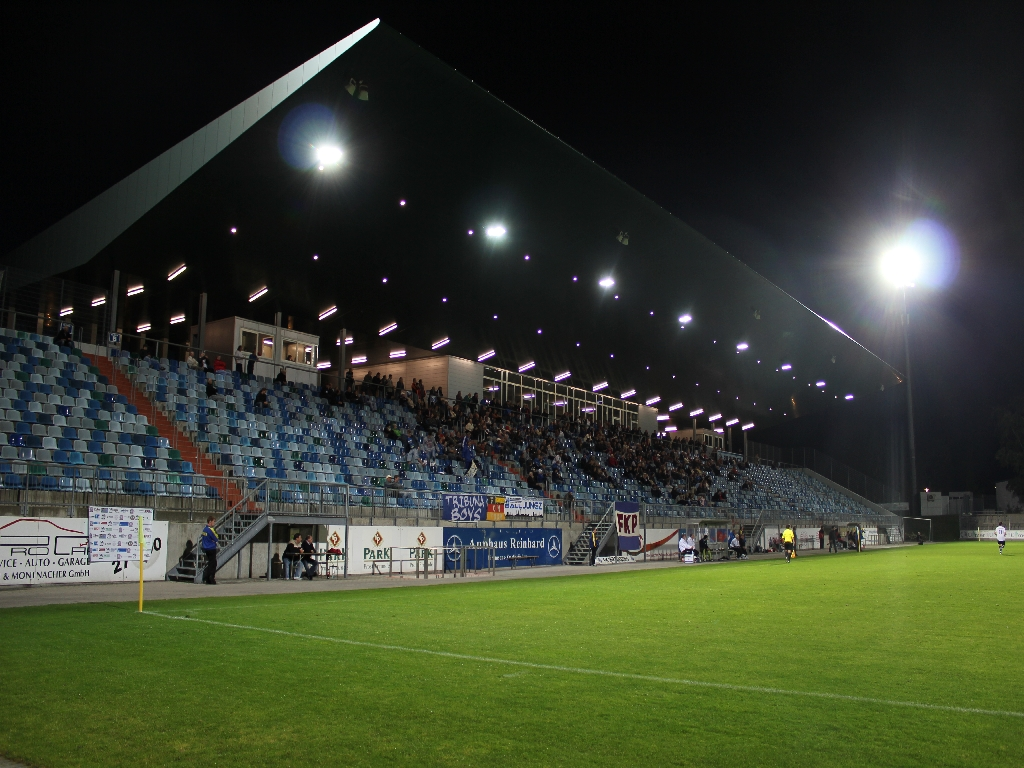
10 11 fkp idaroberstein

Sportpark Husterhöhe is a multi-use stadium in Pirmasens, Germany. It is currently used mostly for football matches and is the home stadium of FK Pirmasens. The stadium is able to hold 10,000 people and opened in 2004. On 5 September 2009, the stadium hosted Germany U-20's 6–1 win over South Africa U-20.
