= Avdo Spahić =

Bosnian footballer

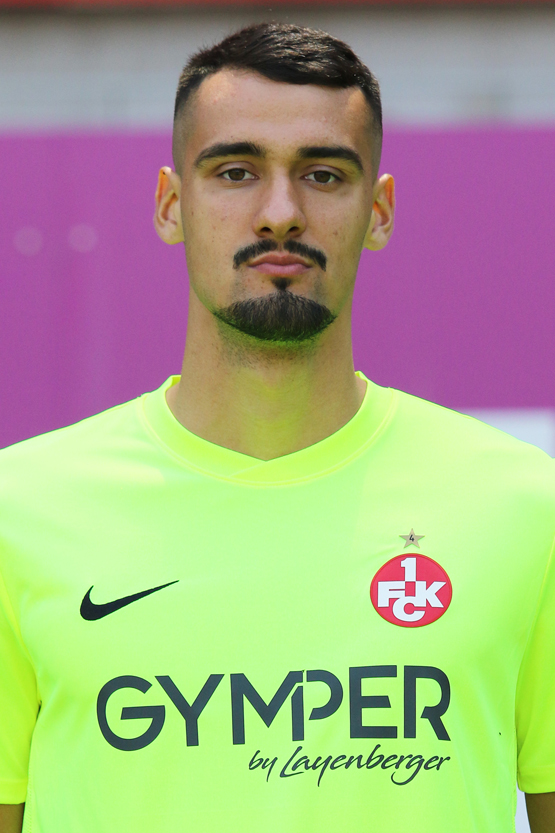
- Spahić with 1. FC Kaiserslautern in 2019

Personal information
- Date of birth: 12 February 1997 (age 29)
- Place of birth: Berlin, Germany
- Height: 1.90 m (6 ft 3 in)
- Position: Goalkeeper

Team information
- Current team: 1. FC Kaiserslautern
- Number: 1

Youth career
- SFC Stern
- –2014: Tennis Borussia Berlin
- 2014–2016: Energie Cottbus

Senior career*
Years	Team	Apps	(Gls)
2015–2019	Energie Cottbus	76	(0)
2015–2016	Energie Cottbus II	8	(0)
2019–2026	1. FC Kaiserslautern	46	(0)

International career
2015	Bosnia and Herzegovina U19	1	(0)
- * Club domestic league appearances and goals as of 17 May 2026

Avdo Spahić (born 12 February 1997) is a professional footballer who plays as a goalkeeper. Born in Germany, he has represented Bosnia at youth level.

== Club career ==
Born in Berlin, Spahić spent five years at Energie Cottbus before joining 1. FC Kaiserslautern in 2019.

== Career statistics ==
As of match played 5 July 2023

Appearances and goals by club, season and competition
Club	Season	League			Cup		Europe		Other		Total	
Club	Season	Division	Apps	Goals	Apps	Goals	Apps	Goals	Apps	Goals	Apps	Goals
Energie Cottbus	2014–15	3. Liga	0	0	—		—		—		0	0
Energie Cottbus	2015–16	3. Liga	0	0	0	0	—		—		0	0
Energie Cottbus	2016–17	Regionalliga Nordost	20	0	—		—		—		20	0
Energie Cottbus	2017–18	Regionalliga Nordost	28	0	0	0	—		—		28	0
Energie Cottbus	2018–19	3. Liga	30	0	1	0	—		—		31	0
Energie Cottbus	Total		78	0	1	0	—		—		79	0
1. FC Kaiserslautern	2019–20	3. Liga	5	0	0	0	—		—		5	0
1. FC Kaiserslautern	2020–21	3. Liga	35	0	1	0	—		—		36	0
1. FC Kaiserslautern	2021–22	3. Liga	3	0	0	0	—		0	0	3	0
1. FC Kaiserslautern	2022–23	2. Bundesliga	3	0	0	0	—		—		3	0
1. FC Kaiserslautern	2023–24	2. Bundesliga	0	0	0	0	—		—		1	0
1. FC Kaiserslautern	Total		46	0	1	0	—		0	0	47	0
Career total			124	0	2	0	0	0	0	0	126	0
