= List of 1. FC Kaiserslautern seasons =

1. FC Kaiserslautern is a German football club based in Kaiserslautern, Rhineland-Palatinate.

== Seasons ==
Season	League										DFB-Pokal	Other		Top goalscorer(s)	
Season	Division	Tier	Pld	W	D	L	GF	GA	Pts	Pos	DFB-Pokal	Other		Player(s)	Goals
1963–64	Bundesliga	1	30	10	6	14	48	69	26	12th	R2	—		(Germany) Erich Meier	11
1964–65	Bundesliga	1	30	11	3	16	41	53	25	13th	R2	—		(Germany) Helmut Kapitulski	9
1965–66	Bundesliga	1	34	8	10	16	42	65	26	15th	SF	—		(Germany) Manfred Rummel	11
1966–67	Bundesliga	1	34	13	12	9	43	42	38	5th	R2	—		(Germany) Willy Reitgaßl	9
1967–68	Bundesliga	1	34	8	12	14	39	67	28	16th	R1	—		(Germany) Helmut Kapitulski (Germany) Gerd Roggensack	10
1968–69	Bundesliga	1	34	12	6	16	45	47	30	15th	SF	—		(Germany) Heinz-Dieter Hasebrink	12
1969–70	Bundesliga	1	34	10	12	12	44	55	32	10th	R1	—		(Germany) Otto Geisert	9
1970–71	Bundesliga	1	34	15	4	15	54	57	34	8th	R2	—		(Germany) Karlheinz Vogt	22
1971–72	Bundesliga	1	34	14	7	13	59	53	35	7th	RU	—		(Socialist Federal Republic of Yugoslavia) Idriz Hošić	13
1972–73	Bundesliga	1	34	12	10	12	58	68	34	9th	QF	UEFA Cup	QF	(Socialist Federal Republic of Yugoslavia) Idriz Hošić (Germany) Wolfgang Seel	10
1973–74	Bundesliga	1	34	15	8	11	80	69	38	16th	QF	—		(Germany) Klaus Toppmöller	21
1974–75	Bundesliga	1	34	13	5	16	56	55	31	13th	R3	—		(Sweden) Roland Sandberg	22
1975–76	Bundesliga	1	34	15	7	12	66	60	37	7th	RU	—		(Germany) Klaus Toppmöller	22
1976–77	Bundesliga	1	34	12	5	17	53	59	29	13th	R3	UEFA Cup	R2	(Germany) Klaus Toppmöller	19
1977–78	Bundesliga	1	34	16	4	14	64	63	36	8th	R3	—		(Germany) Klaus Toppmöller	21
1978–79	Bundesliga	1	34	16	11	7	62	47	43	3rd	R3	—		(Germany) Klaus Toppmöller	17
1979–80	Bundesliga	1	34	18	5	11	75	53	41	3rd	R2	UEFA Cup	QF	(Germany) Rainer Geye	17
1980–81	Bundesliga	1	34	17	10	7	60	37	44	4th	RU	UEFA Cup	R2	(Germany) Friedhelm Funkel	13
1981–82	Bundesliga	1	34	16	10	8	70	61	42	4th	R1	UEFA Cup	SF	(Germany) Hans-Peter Briegel	13
1982–83	Bundesliga	1	34	14	13	7	57	44	41	6th	R1	UEFA Cup	QF	(Germany) Thomas Allofs (Germany) Norbert Eilenfeldt	11
1983–84	Bundesliga	1	34	12	6	16	68	69	30	12th	R2	UEFA Cup	R1	(Germany) Thomas Allofs	15
1984–85	Bundesliga	1	34	11	11	12	56	60	33	11th	R1	—		(Germany) Thomas Allofs	19
1985–86	Bundesliga	1	34	10	10	14	49	54	30	11th	QF	—		(Germany) Thomas Allofs	16
1986–87	Bundesliga	1	34	15	7	12	64	51	37	7th	R1	—		(Germany) Frank Hartmann	17
1987–88	Bundesliga	1	34	11	7	16	53	62	29	14th	R3	—		(Germany) Harald Kohr	16
1988–89	Bundesliga	1	34	10	13	11	47	44	33	9th	QF	—		(Germany) Harald Kohr	13
1989–90	Bundesliga	1	34	10	11	13	42	55	31	12th	W	—		(Germany) Stefan Kuntz	15
1990–91	Bundesliga	1	34	19	10	5	72	45	48	1st	R2	UEFA Cup Winners' Cup	R1	(Germany) Stefan Kuntz	11
1990–91	Bundesliga	1	34	19	10	5	72	45	48	1st	R2	DFL-Supercup	RU	(Germany) Stefan Kuntz	11
1991–92	Bundesliga	1	38	17	10	11	58	42	44	5th	QF	European Cup	R2	(Bosnia and Herzegovina) Demir Hotić (Germany) Stefan Kuntz	11
1991–92	Bundesliga	1	38	17	10	11	58	42	44	5th	QF	DFL-Supercup	W	(Bosnia and Herzegovina) Demir Hotić (Germany) Stefan Kuntz	11
1992–93	Bundesliga	1	34	13	9	12	50	40	35	8th	R2	UEFA Cup	R3	(Germany) Marcel Witeczek	10
1993–94	Bundesliga	1	34	18	7	9	64	36	43	2nd	QF	—		(Germany) Stefan Kuntz	18
1994–95	Bundesliga	1	34	17	12	5	58	41	46	4th	SF	UEFA Cup	R2	(Czech Republic) Pavel Kuka	16
1995–96	Bundesliga	1	34	6	18	10	31	37	36	16th	W	UEFA Cup	R2	(Czech Republic) Pavel Kuka	10
1996–97	2. Bundesliga	2	34	19	11	4	74	28	68	1st	R1	UEFA Cup Winners' Cup	R1	(Czech Republic) Pavel Kuka	14
1996–97	2. Bundesliga	2	34	19	11	4	74	28	68	1st	R1	DFL-Supercup	RU	(Czech Republic) Pavel Kuka	14
1997–98	Bundesliga	1	34	19	11	4	63	39	68	1st	R3	—		(Germany) Olaf Marschall	21
1998–99	Bundesliga	1	34	19	6	9	62	37	63	5th	R2	UEFA Champions League	QF	(Germany) Olaf Marschall	12
1999–2000	Bundesliga	1	34	15	5	14	54	59	50	5th	R3	UEFA Cup	R3	(France) Youri Djorkaeff	11
2000–01	Bundesliga	1	34	15	5	14	49	54	50	8th	R2	UEFA Cup	SF	(Germany) Miroslav Klose (Czech Republic) Vratislav Lokvenc	9
2001–02	Bundesliga	1	34	17	5	12	62	53	56	7th	QF	—		(Germany) Miroslav Klose	16
2002–03	Bundesliga	1	34	10	10	14	40	42	40	14th	RU	UEFA Intertoto Cup	R3	(Germany) Miroslav Klose	9
2003–04	Bundesliga	1	34	11	6	17	39	62	36	15th	R1	UEFA Cup	R1	(Germany) Miroslav Klose	10
2004–05	Bundesliga	1	34	12	6	16	43	52	42	12th	R2	—		(Turkey) Halil Altıntop (Greece) Ioannis Amanatidis (Iran) Ferydoon Zandi	6
2005–06	Bundesliga	1	34	8	9	17	47	71	33	16th	R3	—		(Turkey) Halil Altıntop	20
2006–07	2. Bundesliga	2	34	13	14	7	48	34	53	6th	R2	—		(Algeria) Noureddine Daham (Hungary) Tamás Hajnal	7
2007–08	2. Bundesliga	2	34	9	12	13	37	37	39	13th	R2	—		(Canada) Josh Simpson	6
2008–09	2. Bundesliga	2	34	15	7	12	53	48	52	7th	R1	—		(Slovakia) Erik Jendrišek	14
2009–10	2. Bundesliga	2	34	19	10	5	56	28	67	1st	R3	—		(Slovakia) Erik Jendrišek	15
2010–11	Bundesliga	1	34	13	7	14	48	51	46	7th	QF	—		(Croatia) Srđan Lakić	16
2011–12	Bundesliga	1	34	4	11	19	24	54	23	18th	R3	—		(Israel) Itay Shechter	4
2012–13	2. Bundesliga	2	34	15	13	6	55	33	58	3rd	R2	—		(Cameroon) Mohammadou Idrissou	18
2013–14	2. Bundesliga	2	34	15	9	10	55	39	54	4th	SF	—		(Cameroon) Mohammadou Idrissou	16
2014–15	2. Bundesliga	2	34	14	14	6	45	31	56	4th	R3	—		(Germany) Philipp Hofmann (Croatia) Srđan Lakić (Finland) Alexander Ring	6
2015–16	2. Bundesliga	2	34	12	9	13	49	47	45	10th	R2	—		(Norway) Ruben Yttergård Jenssen (Poland) Kacper Przybyłko	7
2016–17	2. Bundesliga	2	34	10	11	13	29	33	41	13th	R1	—		(England) Osayamen Osawe (Cameroon) Jacques Zoua	6
2017–18	2. Bundesliga	2	34	9	8	17	42	55	35	18th	R2	—		(Sweden) Sebastian Andersson	12
2018–19	3. Liga	3	38	13	12	13	49	51	51	9th	R1	—		(Germany) Christian Kühlwetter	15
2019–20	3. Liga	3	38	14	13	11	59	54	55	10th	R3	—		(Germany) Christian Kühlwetter	17
2020–21	3. Liga	3	38	8	19	11	47	52	43	14th	R1	—		(Germany) Marvin Pourié	11
2021–22	3. Liga	3	38	18	9	9	56	27	63	3rd	R1	—		(United States) Terrence Boyd	15
2022–23	2. Bundesliga	2	34	11	12	11	47	48	45	9th	R1	—		(United States) Terrence Boyd	13
2023–24	2. Bundesliga	2	34	11	6	17	59	64	39	13th	RU	—		(Germany) Ragnar Ache	16
2024–25	2. Bundesliga	2	34	15	8	11	56	55	53	7th	R1	—		(Germany) Ragnar Ache	18
2025–26	2. Bundesliga	2	34	16	4	14	52	47	52	6th	R3	—		(Croatia) Ivan Prtajin	11
