= Muhammed Kiprit =

Turkish footballer

Personal information
- Full name: Muhammed Enes Kiprit
- Date of birth: 9 July 1999 (age 27)
- Place of birth: Berlin, Germany
- Height: 1.84 m (6 ft 0 in)
- Position: Forward

Team information
- Current team: Pendikspor
- Number: 99

Youth career
- 2014–2015: Tennis Borussia Berlin
- 2015–2019: Hertha BSC

Senior career*
Years	Team	Apps	(Gls)
2017–2020	Hertha BSC II	43	(25)
2019	→ Wacker Innsbruck (loan)	5	(0)
2020–2021	KFC Uerdingen	36	(9)
2021–2023	1. FC Kaiserslautern	26	(3)
2023–2026	Manisa	78	(7)
2024	→ Şanlıurfaspor (loan)	8	(0)
2026–	Pendikspor	3	(1)

International career^{‡}
2016–2017	Turkey U19	2	(0)
2018	Germany U19	1	(0)
2018–2019	Turkey U21	4	(1)
- * Club domestic league appearances and goals as of 31 October 2026 ‡ National team caps and goals as of 17:41, 29 May 2022 (UTC)

Muhammed Enes Kiprit (born 9 July 1999) is a professional footballer who plays as a forward for TFF 1. Lig club Pendikspor. He represented both Germany and, most recently, Turkey at youth level.

== Club career ==
A youth product of Hertha BSC, Kiprit signed his first professional contract with them on 11 May 2018. Kiprit was loaned to Wacker Innsbruck in Austria in February 2019. Kiprit made his professional debut with Wacker Innsbruck in a 3–0 Austrian Football Bundesliga loss to FC Admira Wacker Mödling on 23 February 2019.

He signed for KFC Uerdingen on a two-year contract in September 2020. He scored 9 goals in 36 appearances in the 3. Liga.

Kiprit moved to 1. FC Kaiserslautern in July 2021.

On 11 September 2023, Kiprit signed a three-year contract with Manisa in the TFF First League.

== International career ==
Kiprit was born in Germany and is of Turkish descent, and represented both countries at a youth level. Originally a youth international for Turkey, Kiprit represented the Germany national under-19 team once in 2018. He then switched back to represent the Turkey U21s.
