= Mike Wunderlich =

German footballer

Personal information
- Date of birth: 25 March 1986 (age 40)
- Place of birth: Cologne, West Germany
- Height: 1.84 m (6 ft 0 in)
- Position: Attacking midfielder

Youth career
- –2004: Viktoria Köln
- 2004–2005: 1. FC Köln

Senior career*
Years	Team	Apps	(Gls)
2005–2009	1. FC Köln II	94	(26)
2009–2010	Rot-Weiss Essen	46	(12)
2010–2012	FSV Frankfurt	28	(5)
2011–2012	→ Viktoria Köln (loan)	34	(32)
2012–2021	Viktoria Köln	263	(140)
2021–2022	1. FC Kaiserslautern	51	(11)
2023	Viktoria Köln	20	(4)
Total		536	(230)
- * Club domestic league appearances and goals

Mike Wunderlich (born 25 March 1986) is a German former professional footballer who played as an attacking midfielder.

== Career ==
=== Early career ===
Wunderlich began his career playing for the youth academy of FC Viktoria Köln, until 2004 when he transferred to 1. FC Köln. After one year playing for the FC's youth academy, he was called up to the reserve team in 2005. In 2006, Wunderlich made his senior debut in Regionalliga match against VfB Lübeck. He would go on to play fifteen more matches that season. After playing all but two of 1. FC Köln's Regionalliga matches in the first half of the 2008–09 season, he transferred to Rot-Weiss Essen, another Regionalliga team.

=== Rot-Weiss Essen and FSV Frankfurt ===
Wunderlich would play one and a half season for Essen, before joining second division club FSV Frankfurt over the summer break in 2010. He seemed to have found his footing in Frankfurt, playing very well in the 2010–11 season. However, after the season, he requested to be sent back (on loan) to the fifth-league tier of Viktoria Köln to help him recover from burn out.

=== Viktoria Köln ===
In early 2012 he stated that he was not up to handling the pressures of professional football, and asked to remain with Viktoria Köln. His outstanding performance helped Viktoria Köln to be promoted to the newly formed Regionalliga (fourth league) at the end of the 2011–12 season, and get off to a very good start to the 2012–13 season.

Wunderlich was the top scorer of the 2016–17 Regionalliga West season with 29 goals as Viktoria finished as champions, thus qualifying for the promotion play-offs. He scored from the penalty-spot in the first leg of the club play-off tie against FC Carl Zeiss Jena but it was not enough as they lost on away goals after a 3–3 aggregate result.

Wunderlich was restricted to just 16 matches during the 2018–19 Regionalliga season but contributed 10 goals as Viktoria again secured the Regionalliga West championship and this time won promotion to the 3. Liga.

=== 1. FC Kaiserslautern ===
In June 2021 it was announced Wunderlich would join 3. Liga side 1. FC Kaiserslautern for the 2021–22 season.

=== Return to Viktoria Köln ===
On 14 December 2022, the return of Wunderlich to Viktoria Köln on 1 January 2023 was announced.

== Honours ==
Viktoria Köln

- Regionalliga West: 2016–17, 2018–19
- Middle Rhine Cup: 2013–14, 2014–15, 2015–16, 2017–18

Individual

- Regionalliga West top scorer: 2016–17
