= Neal Gibs =

German footballer (born 2002)

Personal information
- Full name: Neal Sixten Gibs
- Date of birth: 1 January 2002 (age 24)
- Place of birth: Landstuhl, Germany
- Height: 1.80 m (5 ft 11 in)
- Position: Full-back

Team information
- Current team: 1. FC Kaiserslautern II
- Number: 22

Youth career
- –2013: VfB Reichenbach
- 2013–2021: 1. FC Kaiserslautern

Senior career*
| Years | Team | Apps | (Gls) |
| 2021–2026 | 1. FC Kaiserslautern | 6 | (0) |
| 2021– | 1. FC Kaiserslautern II | 80 | (9) |
| 2022–2023 | → FC Astoria Walldorf (loan) | 24 | (1) |
| 2023–2024 | → SGV Freiberg (loan) | 29 | (0) |
- * Club domestic league appearances and goals as of 24 September 2026

Neal Sixten Gibs (born 1 January 2002) is a German professional footballer who plays as a full-back for Regionalliga Südwest club 1. FC Kaiserslautern II.

== Career ==
Gibs joined 1. FC Kaiserslautern in 2013 at the age of 11. He signed his first professional contract with the club in May 2021.

On 16 August 2022, Gibs extended his contract with Kaiserslautern and was loaned to FC Astoria Walldorf for the 2022–23 season.
