= 2012–13 Borussia Dortmund II season =

Borussia Dortmund II
2012–13 season
- Head Coach: David Wagner
- Stadium: Stadion Rote Erde, Dortmund, NRW
- 3. Liga: 16th
- Top goalscorer: Rico Benatelli (8)

The 2012–13 Borussia Dortmund II season is their first professional season since promotion last season.

== Review and events ==
The 2012–13 Borussia Dortmund II season began on 21 July 2012 with a loss against VfL Osnabrück. It was scheduled to end against VfB Stuttgart II on 18 May 2013.

== Match results ==
=== Legend ===
Win Draw Loss Postponed

=== 3. Liga ===
==== League results and fixtures ====
Match	Date	Time	Venue	City	Opponent	Result^{1}	Attendance	Goalscorers		Source
Match	Date	Time	Venue	City	Opponent	Result^{1}	Attendance	Borussia Dortmund II	Opponent	Source
1	21 July	14:00	Osnatel-Arena	Osnabrück	VfL Osnabrück	0–2	11,500	—		
2	28 July	14:00	Stadion Rote Erde	Dortmund	Arminia Bielefeld	1–1	5,500	Benatelli 23'		
3	3 August	19:00	New Tivoli	Aachen	Alemannia Aachen	1–1	19,543	Halstenberg 41' (pen.)		
4	7 August	19:00	Stadion Rote Erde	Dortmund	Wacker Burghausen	2–1	2,250	Benatelli 20', 42'		
5	11 August	14:00	Stadion Rote Erde	Dortmund	1. FC Saarbrücken	1–2	3,150	Demirbay 77'		
6	25 August	14:00	Sparda Bank Hessen Stadium	Offenbach	Kickers Offenbach	0–3	7,091	—		
7	28 August	14:00	Stadion Rote Erde	Dortmund	Karlsruher SC	0–3	3,130	—		
8	1 September	14:00	Steigerwaldstadion	Erfurt	Rot-Weiß Erfurt	0–5	4,082	—		
9	16 September	14:00	Stadion Rote Erde	Dortmund	Stuttgarter Kickers	1–1	1,610	Meißner 45'+1' (pen.)	Leist 68'	
10	22 September	14:00	Generali Sportpark	Unterhaching	SpVgg Unterhaching	3–4	1,750	Demirbay 50'; Baykan 70'; Benatelli 74'	Rohracker 16'; Yılmaz 39', 90'; Fischer 77'	
11	25 September	19:00	Stadion Rote Erde	Dortmund	Babelsberg 03	0–0	310	—	—	
12	29 September	14:00	Preußenstadion	Münster	Preußen Münster	0–1	7,224			
13					Chemnitzer FC					
14					Darmstadt 98					
15					Hansa Rostock					
16					Wehen Wiesbaden					
17					1. FC Heidenheim					
18					Hallescher FC					
19					VfB Stuttgart II					
20					VfL Osnabrück					
21					Arminia Bielefeld					
22					Alemannia Aachen					
23					Wacker Burghausen					
24					1. FC Saarbrücken					
25					Kickers Offenbach					
26					Karlsruher SC					
27					Rot-Weiß Erfurt					
28					Stuttgarter Kickers					
29					SpVgg Unterhaching					
30					Babelsberg 03					
31					Preußen Münster					
32					Chemnitzer FC					
33					Darmstadt 98					
34					Hansa Rostock					
35					Wehen Wiesbaden					
36					1. FC Heidenheim					
37					Hallescher FC					
38					VfB Stuttgart II					

==== Table ====
===== Summary table =====
Overall								Home						Away					
Pld	W	D	L	GF	GA	GD	Pts	W	D	L	GF	GA	GD	W	D	L	GF	GA	GD
38	9	14	15	39	58	−19	41	5	9	5	19	22	−3	4	5	10	20	36	−16

Last updated: 30 April 2013.
Source: kicker.de
