= Mitsuru Maruoka =

Japanese footballer

Personal information
- Full name: Mitsuru Maruoka
- Date of birth: 6 January 1996 (age 30)
- Place of birth: Tokushima, Japan
- Height: 1.70 m (5 ft 7 in)
- Position: Midfielder

Team information
- Current team: ASC Hokkaido

Youth career
- 2008–2010: Kawauchi Kita Junior High School
- 2011–2013: Cerezo Osaka

Senior career*
Years	Team	Apps	(Gls)
2014–2019	Cerezo Osaka	7	(0)
2014–2015	→ Borussia Dortmund (loan)	1	(0)
2014–2015	→ Borussia Dortmund II (loan)	39	(4)
2016–2017	→ Cerezo Osaka U23 (loan)	29	(2)
2017	→ V-Varen Nagasaki (loan)	5	(1)
2018	→ Renofa Yamaguchi (loan)	12	(1)
2019	Cerezo Osaka U23	21	(2)
2020–2021	BG Pathum United	12	(0)
2022	Gimpo FC	7	(0)
2022–2024	RANS Nusantara	63	(18)
2024–2025	Bali United	24	(2)
2025	Basara Hyogo	3	(0)
2025–	ASC Hokkaido	0	(0)

International career
2011–2013	Japan U17	10	(1)
2014	Japan U20	2	(0)
Medal record
Cerezo Osaka
Winner	J.League Cup	2017
Winner	Emperor's Cup	2017
BG Pathum United
Winner	Thai League 1	2020
- * Club domestic league appearances and goals as of 6 September 2025

Mitsuru Maruoka (Japanese: 丸岡 満; born 6 January 1996) is a Japanese professional footballer who plays as a midfielder for Hokkaido Soccer League club ASC Hokkaido.

== Club career ==
Maruoka joined Borussia Dortmund in January 2014 on a one and a half year loan from Cerezo Osaka. He made his professional debut in the 3. Liga with the club's reserve team on 25 January 2014 against SpVgg Unterhaching.

Maruoka joined newcomer K League 2 club Gimpo FC in december 2021 after a season in BG Pathum United.

== Personal life ==
Mitsuru's brother, Satoru plays for ReinMeer Aomori in Japan Football League.

== Career statistics ==
As of 10 May 2025

Club	Season	League		Cup		League Cup		Total	
Club	Season	Apps	Goals	Apps	Goals	Apps	Goals	Apps	Goals
Borussia Dortmund II	2013–14	8	0	–		–		8	0
Borussia Dortmund II	2014–15	18	1	–		–		18	1
Borussia Dortmund II	2015–16	13	3	–		–		13	3
Borussia Dortmund	2014–15	1	0	0	0	–		1	0
Cerezo Osaka	2016	3	0	0	0	–		3	0
Cerezo Osaka U23	2016	24	2	–		–		24	2
Cerezo Osaka	2017	4	0	0	0	4	0	8	0
Cerezo Osaka U23	2017	5	0	–		–		5	0
V-Varen Nagasaki	2017	5	1	–		–		5	1
Renofa Yamaguchi	2018	12	1	0	0	–		12	1
Cerezo Osaka	2019	0	0	0	0	0	0	0	0
Cerezo Osaka U23	2019	21	2	–		–		21	2
BG Pathum United	2020–21	12	0	0	0	0	0	12	0
Gimpo FC	2022	7	0	0	0	–		7	0
RANS Nusantara	2022–23	34	7	0	0	–		34	7
RANS Nusantara	2023–24	29	11	0	0	–		29	11
Bali United	2024–25	24	2	0	0	–		24	2
Career total		220	31	0	0	4	0	224	31

== Honours ==
=== Club ===
BG Pathum United

- Thai League 1: 2020–21
