= 2010–11 1. FC Nürnberg season =

1. FC Nürnberg
2010–11 season
- Manager: Dieter Hecking
- Stadium: Frankenstadion
- Bundesliga: 6th
- DFB-Pokal: quarter final
- Top goalscorer: League: Christian Eigler (8); All: Julian Schieber (10)
- Highest home attendance: 48,548 vs various opponents
- Lowest home attendance: 33,111 vs Hannover 96
- Average home league attendance: 42,020
Home colours	Away colours	Third colours

The 2010–11 1. FC Nürnberg season was the 111th season in the club's football history.

== Match results ==
=== Legend ===
Win Draw Loss

=== Bundesliga ===
21 August 2010 1	Borussia Mönchengladbach	1–1	1. FC Nürnberg	Mönchengladbach
15:30 CEST (UTC+02)	Idrissou 31'	Match Report	15' Hegeler	Stadium: Borussia Park; Attendance: 42,202; Referee: Peter Gagelmann; Man of the Match: Idrissou

28 August 2010 2	1. FC Nürnberg	1–2	SC Freiburg	Nuremberg
15:30 CEST (UTC+02)	Schieber 15'	Match Report	40', 53' (pen.) Cissé	Stadium: Frankenstadion; Attendance: 36,780; Referee: Tobias Welz; Man of the Match: Cissé

11 September 2010 3	Hamburger SV	1–1	1. FC Nürnberg	Hamburg
15:30 CEST (UTC+02)	Mathijsen 61'	Match Report	82' (pen.) Pinola	Stadium: Volksparkstadion; Attendance: 54,099; Referee: Markus Wingenbach; Man of the Match: Nilsson

19 September 2010 4	Bayer Leverkusen	0–0	1. FC Nürnberg	Leverkusen
17:30 CEST (UTC+02)		Match Report		Stadium: BayArena; Attendance: 23,963; Referee: Knut Kircher; Man of the Match: Schäfer

22 September 2010 5	1. FC Nürnberg	2–1	VfB Stuttgart	Nuremberg
20:00 CEST	Schieber 3'; Pinola 90'	Match Report	85' Cacau	Stadium: Frankenstadion; Attendance: 36,790; Referee: Dr. Jochen Drees; Man of the Match: Pinola

25 September 2010 6	Eintracht Frankfurt	2–0	1. FC Nürnberg	Frankfurt
15:30 CEST	Gekas 17'; Chris 88'	Match Report		Stadium: Commerzbank-Arena; Attendance: 43,100; Referee: Michael Weiner; Man of the Match: Köhler

2 October 2010 7	1. FC Nürnberg	2–1	FC Schalke 04	Nuremberg
15:30 CEST (UTC+02)	Frantz 62'; Wolf 84'	Match Report	74' Huntelaar	Stadium: Frankenstadion; Attendance: 48,548 (sell-out); Referee: Marco Fritz; Man of the Match: Wolf

16 October 2010 8	FC St. Pauli	3–2	1. FC Nürnberg	Hamburg
15:30 CEST (UTC+02)	Asamoah 45'; Ebbers 59'; Bruns 82'	Match Report	Ekici 48'; Wolf 62'	Stadium: Millerntor-Stadion; Attendance: 24,343 (sell-out); Referee: Peter Gagelmann; Man of the Match: Asamoah

23 October 2010 9	1. FC Nürnberg	2–1	VfL Wolfsburg	Nuremberg
15:30 CEST (UTC+02)	Gündoğan 11'; Frantz 63'	Match Report	28' Grafite	Stadium: Frankenstadion; Attendance: 40,127; Referee: Guido Winkmann; Man of the Match: Gündoğan

30 October 2010 10	Werder Bremen	2–3	1. FC Nürnberg	Bremen
15:30 CEST (UTC+02)	Hugo Almeida 5'; Pizarro 90'	Match Report	45', 73' Gündoğan; 47' Ekici	Stadium: Weserstadion; Attendance: 35,500 (sell-out); Referee: Christian Dingert; Man of the Match: Schieber

6 November 2010 11	1. FC Nürnberg	3–1	1. FC Köln	Nuremberg
15:30 CEST (UTC+02)	Hegeler 11'; Gündoğan 43'; Schieber 90'	Match Report	17' Geromel	Stadium: Frankenstadion; Attendance: 41,789; Referee: Markus Schmidt; Man of the Match: Hegeler

14 November 2010 12	Bayern Munich	3–0	1. FC Nürnberg	Munich
17:30 CET (UTC+01)	Gómez 10', 75'; Lahm 57' (pen.)	Match Report		Stadium: Allianz Arena; Attendance: 69,000 (sell-out); Referee: Thorsten Kinhöfer; Man of the Match: Gómez

20 November 2010 13	1. FC Nürnberg	1–3	1. FC Kaiserslautern	Nuremberg
15:30 CET (UTC+01)	Mak 67'	Match Report	4' Rivić; 12' Iličević; 33' Lakić	Stadium: Frankenstadion; Attendance: 40,711; Referee: Tobias Welz; Man of the Match: Iličević

26 November 2010 14	Mainz 05	3–0	1. FC Nürnberg	Mainz
20:30 CET (UTC+01)	Schürrle 27'; Noveski 54'; Allagui 86'	Match Report		Stadium: Stadion am Bruchweg; Attendance: 20,300 (sell-out); Referee: Peter Gagelmann; Man of the Match: Schürrle

5 December 2010 15	1. FC Nürnberg	0–2	Borussia Dortmund	Nuremberg
17:30 CET (UTC+01)		Match Report	23' Hummels; 88' Lewandowski	Stadium: Frankenstadion; Attendance: 48,548 (sell-out); Referee: Michael Weiner; Man of the Match: Hummels

11 December 2010 16	1899 Hoffenheim	1–1	1. FC Nürnberg	Sinsheim
15:30 CET (UTC+01)	Compper 55'	Match Report	87' Eigler	Stadium: Rhein-Neckar Arena; Attendance: 30,150 (sell-out); Referee: Marc Seemann; Man of the Match: Compper

18 December 2010 17	1. FC Nürnberg	3–1	Hannover 96	Nuremberg
15:30 CET (UTC+01)	Cherundolo 28' (o.g.); Wolf 31'; Schieber 82'	Match Report	76' (pen.) Pinto	Stadium: Frankenstadion; Attendance: 33,111; Referee: Guido Winkmann; Man of the Match: Gündoğan

15 January 2011 18	1. FC Nürnberg	0–1	Borussia Mönchengladbach	Nuremberg
15:30 CET (UTC+01)		Match Report	8' Neustädter	Stadium: Frankenstadion; Attendance: 37,464; Referee: Babak Rafati; Man of the Match: Heimeroth

22 January 2011 19	SC Freiburg	1–1	1. FC Nürnberg	Freiburg
15:30 CET (UTC+01)	Flum 32'	Match Report	56' Schieber	Stadium: Badenova-Stadion; Attendance: 20,000; Referee: Marco Fritz; Man of the Match: Flum

29 January 2011 20	1. FC Nürnberg	2–0	Hamburger SV	Nuremberg
15:30 CET (UTC+01)	Simons 59' (pen.); Cohen 70'	Match Report		Stadium: Frankenstadion; Attendance: 36,202; Referee: Tobias Welz; Man of the Match: Simons

5 February 2011 21	1. FC Nürnberg	1–0	Bayer Leverkusen	Nuremberg
15:30 CET (UTC+01)	Eigler 60'	Match Report		Stadium: Frankenstadion; Attendance: 34,113; Referee: Knut Kircher; Man of the Match: Eigler

12 February 2011 22	VfB Stuttgart	1–4	1. FC Nürnberg	Stuttgart
15:30 CET (UTC+01)	Funk 45'	Match Report	11' Simons; 28' Schieber; 51' Chandler; 62' Ekici	Stadium: Mercedes-Benz Arena; Attendance: 38,000; Referee: Manuel Gräfe; Man of the Match: Schieber

18 February 2011 23	1. FC Nürnberg	3–0	Eintracht Frankfurt	Nuremberg
20:45 CET (UTC+01)	Schieber 67'; Mak 87'; Cohen 90'	Match Report		Stadium: Frankenstadion; Attendance: 40,853; Referee: Thorsten Kinhöfer; Man of the Match: Wollscheid

26 February 2011 24	Schalke 04	1–1	1. FC Nürnberg	Gelsenkirchen
15:30 CET (UTC+01)	Raúl 37'	Match Report	52' Hegeler	Stadium: Veltins-Arena; Attendance: 61,431; Referee: Marco Fritz; Man of the Match: Schäfer

5 March 2011 25	1. FC Nürnberg	5–0	FC St. Pauli	Nuremberg
15:30 CET (UTC+01)	Wollscheid 3'; Eigler 14', 17', 86', 87'	Match Report		Stadium: Frankenstadion; Attendance: 45,109; Referee: Markus Wingenbach; Man of the Match: Eigler

12 March 2011 26	VfL Wolfsburg	1–2	1. FC Nürnberg	Wolfsburg
15:30 CET (UTC+01)	Mandžukić 22'	Match Report	45' Wollscheid; 90' Nilsson	Stadium: Volkswagen Arena; Attendance: 27,316; Referee: Guido Winkmann; Man of the Match: Wollscheid

19 March 2011 27	1. FC Nürnberg	1–3	Werder Bremen	Nuremberg
15:30 CET (UTC+01)	Gündoğan 30'	Match Report	27' (pen.), 89' (pen.) Wagner; 50' Pizarro	Stadium: Frankenstadion; Attendance: 48,548 (sell-out); Referee: Michael Weiner; Man of the Match: Frings

3 April 2011 28	1. FC Köln	1–0	1. FC Nürnberg	Cologne
15:30 CET (UTC+01)	Novaković 90'	Match Report		Stadium: RheinEnergieStadion; Attendance: 49,000; Referee: Florian Meyer; Man of the Match: Novakovič

9 April 2011 29	1. FC Nürnberg	1–1	Bayern Munich	Nuremberg
15:30 CET (UTC+01)	Eigler 60'	Match Report	5' Müller	Stadium: Frankenstadion; Attendance: 48,548 (sell-out); Referee: Knut Kircher; Man of the Match: Eigler

16 April 2011 30	1. FC Kaiserslautern	0–2	1. FC Nürnberg	Kaiserslautern
15:30 CET (UTC+01)		Match Report	34' Eigler; 90' Mak	Stadium: Fritz-Walter-Stadion; Attendance: 49,780 (sell-out); Referee: Guido Winkmann; Man of the Match: Eigler

24 April 2011 31	1. FC Nürnberg	0–0	Mainz 05	Nuremberg
17:30 CET (UTC+01)		Match Report		Stadium: Frankenstadion; Attendance: 48,548 (sell-out); Referee: Manuel Gräfe; Man of the Match: Schürrle

30 April 2011 32	Borussia Dortmund	2–0	1. FC Nürnberg	Dortmund
15:30 CET (UTC+01)	Barrios 32'; Lewandowski 43'	Match Report		Stadium: Westfalenstadion; Attendance: 80,720 (sell-out); Referee: Markus Schmidt; Man of the Match: Hummels

7 May 2011 33	1. FC Nürnberg	1–2	1899 Hoffenheim	Nuremberg
15:30 CEST (UTC+02)	Wollscheid 16'	Match Report	40' Firmino; 86' Sigurðsson	Stadium: Frankenstadion; Attendance: 48,548 (sell-out); Referee: Peter Gagelmann; Man of the Match: Sigurðsson

14 May 2011 34	Hannover 96	3–1	1. FC Nürnberg	Hannover
15:30 CEST (UTC+02)	Haggui 30'; Rausch 60'; Ya Konan 76' (pen.)	Match Report	25' Wießmeier	Stadium: AWD-Arena; Attendance: 49,000 (sell-out); Referee: Knut Kircher; Man of the Match: Schlaudraff

=== DFB-Pokal ===
15 August 2010 1	Eintracht Trier	0–2	1. FC Nürnberg	Trier
16:00 CEST (UTC+02)		Match Report	15' Bunjaku; 90' Ekici	Stadium: Moselstadion; Attendance: 5,200; Referee: Guido Winkmann

27 October 2010 2	SV Elversberg	0–3	1. FC Nürnberg	Elversberg
20:30 CEST (UTC+02)		Match Report	43' Schieber; 50' (pen.) Pinola; 74' Simons	Stadium: Waldstadion an der Kaiserlinde; Attendance: 3,600; Referee: Patrick Ittrich; Man of the Match: Schieber

19 January 2011 3	Kickers Offenbach	0–2	1. FC Nürnberg	Offenbach
19:15 CET (UTC+01)		Match Report	21', 63' Simons	Stadium: Stadion am Bieberer Berg; Attendance: 24,000 (sell-out); Referee: Markus Schmidt; Man of the Match: Ekici

25 January 2011 4	Schalke 04	3–2 (a.e.t.)	1. FC Nürnberg	Gelsenkirchen
20:30 CET (UTC+01)	Gavranović 15'; Rakitić 58'; Draxler 119'	Match Report	4', 32' Schieber	Stadium: Veltins-Arena; Attendance: 49,191; Referee: Peter Gagelmann; Man of the Match: Kluge

== Player information ==
=== Roster and statistics ===
Squad Season 2010–11 Sources:
Player					Bundesliga		DFB-Pokal		Totals	
Player	Nat.	Birthday	at FCN since	Previous club	Matches	Goals	Matches	Goal	Matches	Goals
Goalkeepers
Raphael Schäfer	(Germany)	30 January 1979	2008	VfB Stuttgart	34	0	4	0	38	0
Alexander Stephan	(Germany)	15 September 1986	2006	1. FC Nürnberg II	1	0	0	0	1	0
Defenders
Per Nilsson	(Sweden)	15 September 1982	2010	1899 Hoffenheim	19	1	2	0	21	1
Andreas Wolf	(Germany)	12 June 1982	2002	1. FC Nürnberg II	30	3	4	0	34	3
Dominic Maroh	(Germany)	4 March 1987	2008	SSV Reutlingen	8	0	2	0	10	0
Juri Judt	(Germany)	24 July 1986	2008	Greuther Fürth	24	0	4	0	28	0
Pascal Bieler	(Germany)	26 February 1986	2008	Hertha BSC	4	0	0	0	4	0
Javier Pinola	(Argentina)	24 February 1983	2005	Racing Club	28	2	4	1	32	3
Timothy Chandler	(United States)	29 March 1990	2010	Eintracht Frankfurt	14	1	2	0	16	1
Philipp Wollscheid	(Germany)	6 March 1989	2009	1. FC Nürnberg II	19	3	2	0	21	3
Marvin Plattenhardt	(Germany)	26 January 1992	2010	1. FC Nürnberg II	9	0	0	0	9	0
Midfielders
Timmy Simons	(Belgium)	11 December 1976	2010	PSV	34	2	4	3	38	5
Marek Mintál	(Slovakia)	2 September 1977	2003	MŠK Žilina	17	0	3	0	20	0
Jens Hegeler	(Germany)	22 January 1988	2010	Bayer Leverkusen	34	3	4	0	38	3
Róbert Mak	(Slovakia)	8 March 1991	2010	Manchester City	22	3	0	0	22	3
Mike Frantz	(Germany)	14 October 1986	2008	1. FC Saarbrücken	14	2	2	0	16	2
Almog Cohen	(Israel)	1 September 1988	2010	Maccabi Netanya	25	2	2	0	27	2
Dario Vidošić	(Australia)	8 April 1987	2007	Brisbane Roar	5	0	0	0	5	0
İlkay Gündoğan	(Germany)	24 October 1990	2009	VfL Bochum II	25	5	1	0	26	5
Markus Mendler	(Germany)	7 January 1993	2010	1. FC Nürnberg youth	6	0	1	0	7	0
Julian Wießmeier	(Germany)	4 November 1992	2011	1. FC Nürnberg youth	1	1	0	0	1	1
Mehmet Ekici	(Turkey)	25 March 1990	2010	Bayern Munich	32	3	4	1	36	4
Forwards
Christian Eigler	(Germany)	1 January 1984	2008	Arminia Bielefeld	32	8	4	0	36	8
Albert Bunjaku	(Switzerland)	29 November 1983	2009	Rot-Weiß Erfurt	3	0	1	1	4	1
Nassim Ben Khalifa	(Switzerland)	13 January 1992	2011	VfL Wolfsburg	1	0	0	0	1	0
Isaac Boakye	(Ghana)	26 November 1981	2008	VfL Wolfsburg	2	0	0	0	2	0
Julian Schieber	(Germany)	13 February 1989	2010	VfB Stuttgart	29	7	4	3	33	10
Rubin Okotie	(Austria)	6 June 1987	2010	Austria Wien	4	0	2	0	6	0

== Kits ==
Home	Away	Away Alternate	Third	Third Alternate

Type	Shirt	Shorts	Socks	First appearance / Info
Home	Dark red	Black	Black	
Away	White	White	White	
Away Alt.	White	White	Red	Bundesliga, Match 34, 14 May against Hannover 96
Third	Black	Black	Black	
Third Alt.	Black	Black	White	Bundesliga, Match 12, 14 November against Bayern Munich
