= Moritz Leitner =

German footballer (born 1992)

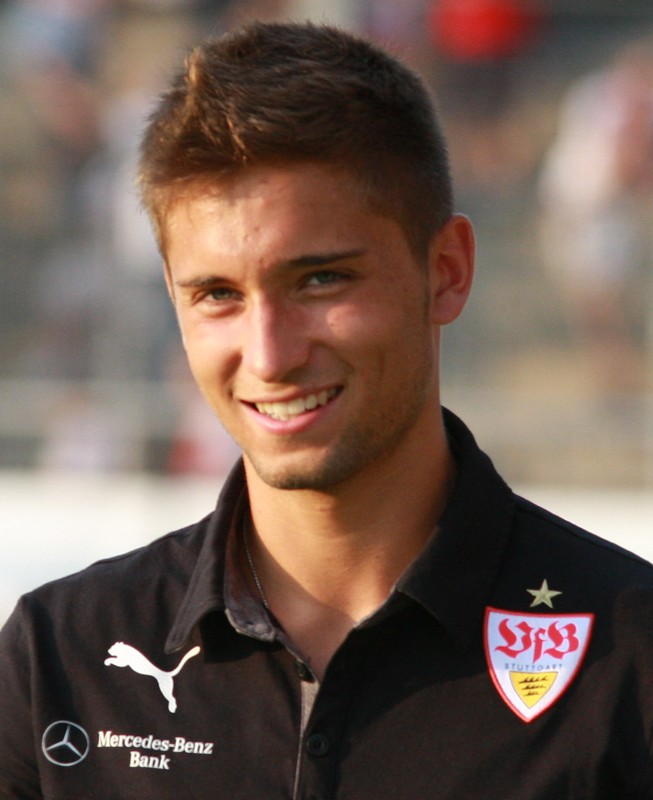
- Leitner with VfB Stuttgart in 2013

Personal information
- Full name: Moritz Leitner
- Date of birth: 8 December 1992 (age 33)
- Place of birth: Munich, Germany
- Position: Midfielder

Youth career
- 1995–1998: FC Unterföhring
- 1998–2010: 1860 Munich

Senior career*
Years	Team	Apps	(Gls)
2010–2011	1860 Munich	16	(0)
2011–2016	Borussia Dortmund	46	(1)
2011	→ FC Augsburg (loan)	9	(0)
2013–2015	→ VfB Stuttgart (loan)	40	(2)
2016–2017	Lazio	2	(0)
2017–2018	FC Augsburg	6	(0)
2018	→ Norwich City (loan)	12	(0)
2018–2021	Norwich City	38	(2)
2021–2022	Zürich	9	(0)

International career^{‡}
2008	Austria U17	1	(0)
2010–2011	Germany U19	8	(7)
2013	Germany U20	2	(2)
2011–2015	Germany U21	24	(7)
- * Club domestic league appearances and goals as of 20:08, 27 May 2022 (UTC) ‡ National team caps and goals as of 18:05, 28 June 2015 (UTC)

Moritz Leitner (born 8 December 1992) is a German professional footballer who plays as a midfielder. He has previously played for Borussia Dortmund, 1860 Munich, FC Augsburg, Lazio, Norwich City and Zürich. He has been capped at youth international level by Germany and Austria.

== Club career ==
=== 1860 Munich ===
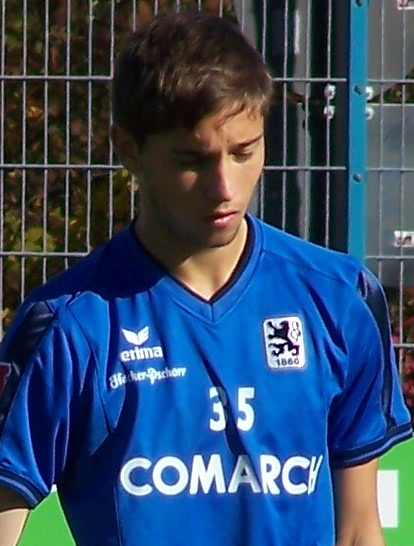
Leitner playing for 1860 Munich.

Born in Munich, Leitner started his football career at FC Unterföhring, joining them at the age of two. As a six-year-old, he moved to 1860 Munich.

Leitner made his professional debut for his childhood club 1860 Munich on 14 August 2010, coming on as a substitute for Aleksandar Ignjovski in a DFB-Pokal match against SC Verl, setting up an equaliser for Stefan Aigner. By the end of 2010, Leitner had made eighteen appearances in all competitions. Prior to his departure in January, his form dipped and he was often relegated to the substitute bench.

=== Borussia Dortmund ===
In October 2010, it was announced that Leitner would move to Borussia Dortmund when the transfer window opened in January 2011. He signed a four-year contract with the club, keeping him there until 2015.

Leitner immediately joined FC Augsburg on loan. When his loan spell at Augsburg came to an end, he returned to Borussia Dortmund and was given the number seven shirt. Having been an unused substitute from the start of the season, he made his Borusssia Dortmund debut on 24 September 2011, coming on as a second-half substitute in a 2–1 win over Mainz 05. Leitner made a handful of first team appearances between 22 October 2011 and 26 November 2011, when he suffered a back injury that kept him out throughout 2012. On 22 January 2012, he made his return to the first team, setting up a goal in a 5–1 win over Hamburger SV. Although he suffered another injury later in the season, Leitner made 22 appearances in his first season although, because of competition in the playmaker position, only four as a starter in the 2011–12 season. In those 22 games, he made two assists.

Leitner made his first start of the 2012–13 season in a 2–1 loss against Bayern Munich in the DFL-Supercup. After the departure of Shinji Kagawa, he received more game time, making 30 appearances. Due to the impressive performances of Mario Götze, however, only ten of these were as a starter and he spent most of the 2012–13 season on the substitutes bench. He appeared as an unused substitute in the UEFA Champions League Final against Bayern Munich. He made three assists with no goals scored. Leitner hinted at leaving Borussia Dortmund to get first team football in the 2013–14 season.

After two seasons on loan at Stuttgart, Leitner's future at Borussia Dortmund became uncertain following the arrival of Thomas Tuchel. In the first half of the season, he played for the club's reserve side. His first appearance came on 1 October 2015 - a 1–1 draw against PAOK in the UEFA Europa League. In second half of the season Leitner played for the first team due to an injury crisis. He went on to make twelve appearances in all competitions.

==== Loan to Augsburg ====
Shortly after joining Borussia Dortmund, Leitner joined FC Augsburg on loan until the end of the 2010–11 season in January 2011.

He made his Augsburg debut in a 2–0 win over Ingolstadt 04 on 16 January 2011, setting up one goal. After being sidelined with an elbow injury, Leitner made 9 appearances for the club.

==== Loan to Stuttgart ====
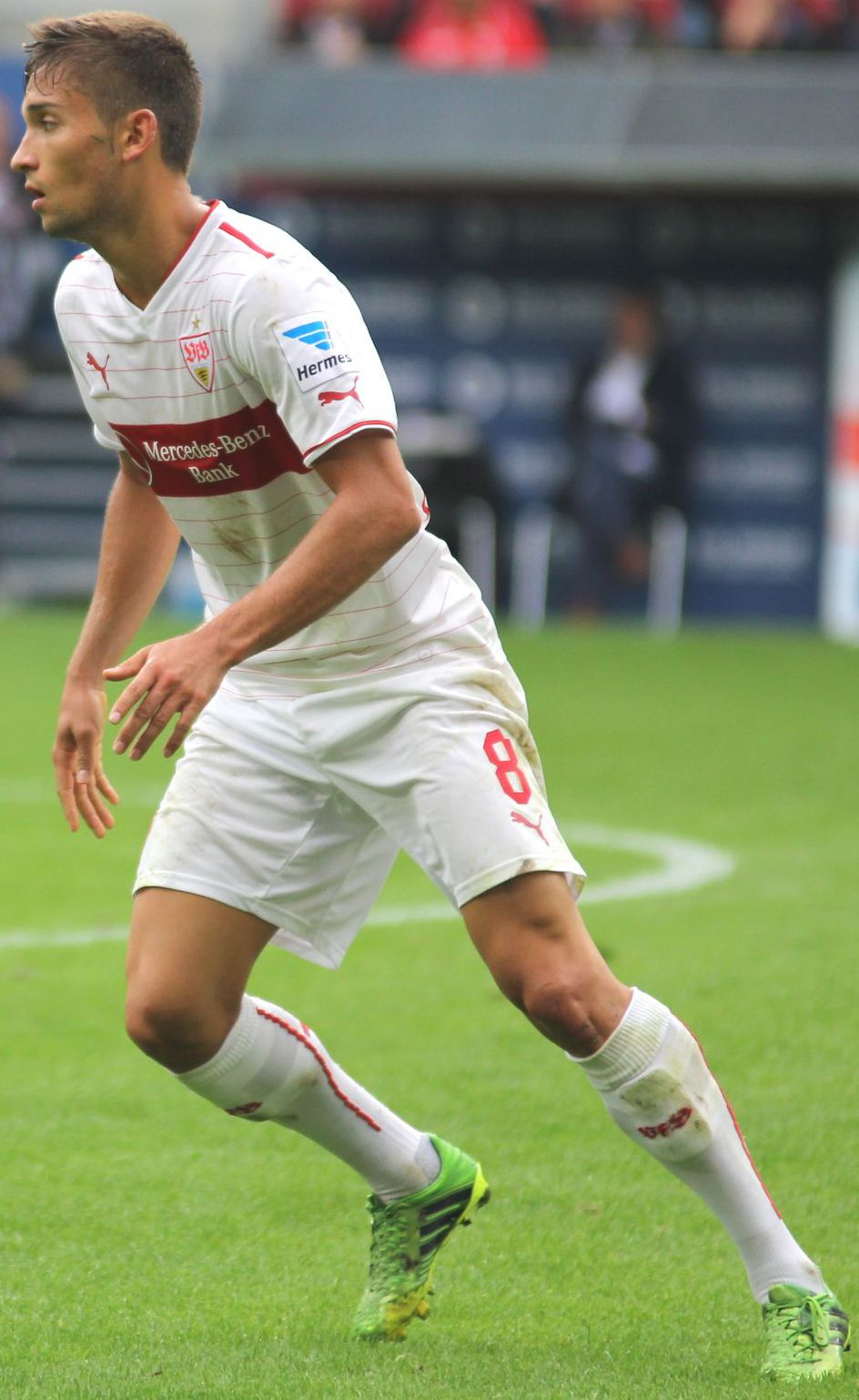
Leitner playing for VfB Stuttgart.

On 1 July 2013, Moritz Leitner joined VfB Stuttgart on loan until June 2015.

He made his Stuttgart debut in their first game of the Bundesliga season in a 3–2 loss against Mainz 05. He suffered a knee injury in training in September 2013. He returned to the first team on 1 November 2013, playing against his parent club in a 6–1 loss. On 1 February 2014, Leitner scored his first Bundesliga goal in Stuttgart's 2–1 defeat to Bayer Leverkusen. He was sent off for a second bookable offence in a 4–1 loss against 1899 Hoffenheim on 15 February 2014. Having suffered injuries throughout the season, Leitner finished his first season with Stuttgart with 24 appearances and one goal in all competitions.

In his second season at Stuttgart, Leitner continued to be a first team regular. He scored his first goal of the season in a 3–2 loss against Hertha BSC on 3 October 2014. During a 3–3 draw against Bayer 04 Leverkusen on 18 October 2014, Leitner suffered a thigh injury and was sidelined as a result. As the 2014–15 season progressed, his first team opportunities came under threat when he fell out with manager Huub Stevens, resulting in Leitner being dropped from the first team. Leitner was also demoted to the reserve side for the rest of the season. He made 20 appearances and scored once in all competitions.

Just before the end of the season, it was announced that Leitner would return to his parent club when the 2014–15 season ended.

=== Lazio ===
On 12 August 2016, Lazio signed Leitner from Borussia Dortmund for a fee of €1.5 million. He was signed to replace Ogenyi Onazi, who had joined Turkish Süper Lig club Trabzonspor.

On 1 October 2016, he made his Lazio debut, coming on as a late substitute in a 3–0 win over Udinese. Leitner made another appearance on 26 October 2016 in a 4–1 win over Cagliari. Leitner spent the first half of the season on the bench. He made two appearances for Lazio.

=== FC Augsburg ===
On 31 January 2017, Leitner was signed by Bundesliga side FC Augsburg on a four-year deal for a reported fee of €2 million. Upon joining the club, he was given the number five shirt.

Leitner did not appear in the first team immediately, due to issues in adapting to the club's playing style. On 17 February 2017, he made his second debut for Augsburg in a 3–1 loss against Bayer 04 Leverkusen. Leitner made his first start on 12 March 2017 in a 3–0 loss against Schalke 04. He made six appearances for the club in the 2016–17 season.

=== Norwich City ===
Having failed to make an appearance in the first half of the 2017–18 season, Leitner was loaned to EFL Championship side Norwich City on 25 January 2018 for six months. His debut for Norwich City was as a substitute in a 0–1 win over Brentford on 27 January 2018. On 26 June 2018, Leitner joined the club permanently on a four-year deal for an undisclosed fee. He scored the equaliser in the first East Anglian derby of the 2018–19 season, the game finishing 1–1. With Norwich, he won promotion to the Premier League in the 2018–19 season. Afterwards, he fell out of favour and only made nine appearances in the top flight, as the club suffered relegation after one season. Despite this, Leitner remained out of the squad and made no appearances as the Canaries secured another Championship title for the 2020–21 season.

=== Zürich ===
On 7 August 2021, Leitner signed a one-year contract with Swiss Super League club Zürich. On 21 May 2022, Zürich announced that Leitner's contract will not be extended.

== International career ==
Having made one appearance for Austria U17 - against Estonia U17 on 21 May 2008, a 7–0 win - Leitner appeared to switch nationality.

In September 2010, Leitner received German citizenship, making him eligible to play for Germany. He made his debut for the U19 national side in a 3–0 win over Denmark U19. Leitner scored two goals in a 10–0 win over Andorra U19 on 8 October 2010 and another in a 2–1 win over Northern Ireland U19 three days later. He later went on to score four more goals for the German U19s, including one in a 5–0 win over Macedonia U19.

Leitner made his debut for Germany U21 in a 4–1 win over Cyprus U21 on 9 August 2011. Leitner scored his first Germany U21 goal on 10 October 2011 in an 8–0 win over San Marino U21. He captained the team three times. Leitner was also included in the UEFA European Under-21 Championship squad, playing once in the tournament.

In March 2013, Leitner was called up by Germany U20. He scored in both legs against Switzerland U21.

== Personal life ==
Leitner's father, Erwin Feldberger (born 1943), comes from the Baden-Württemberg town of Burladingen. His mother comes from Austria. His father was also a footballer. Leitner is one of two children and grew up in the suburb of Oberföhring.

== Career statistics ==
As of the start of the 2020–21 campaign

Appearances and goals by club, season and competition
Club	Season	League			Cup		Continental		Other (Note: Includes German Super Cup.)		Total		Ref.
Club	Season	Division	Apps	Goals	Apps	Goals	Apps	Goals	Apps	Goals	Apps	Goals	Ref.
1860 Munich	2010–11	2. Bundesliga	16	0	2	0	—		—		18	0	
FC Augsburg (loan)	2010–11	2. Bundesliga	9	0	0	0	—		—		9	0	
Borussia Dortmund II	2011–12	Regionalliga West	2	0	—		—		—		2	0	
Borussia Dortmund II	2015–16	Regionalliga West	8	3	—		—		—		8	3	
Borussia Dortmund II	Total		10	3	—		—		—		10	3	—
Borussia Dortmund	2011–12	Bundesliga	17	0	2	0	3	0	1	0	23	0	
Borussia Dortmund	2012–13	Bundesliga	25	0	1	0	4	0	1	0	31	0	
Borussia Dortmund	2015–16	Bundesliga	8	0	1	0	3	0	—		12	0	
Borussia Dortmund	Total		50	0	4	0	10	0	2	0	66	0	—
VfB Stuttgart (loan)	2013–14	Bundesliga	21	1	1	0	2	0	—		24	1	
VfB Stuttgart (loan)	2014–15	Bundesliga	19	1	1	0	—		—		20	1	
VfB Stuttgart (loan)	Total		40	2	2	0	2	0	—		44	2	—
VfB Stuttgart II (loan)	2014–15	3. Liga	1	0	—		—		—		1	0	
Lazio	2016–17	Serie A	2	0	0	0	—		—		2	0	
FC Augsburg	2016–17	Bundesliga	6	0	0	0	—		—		6	0	
Norwich City (loan)	2017–18	Championship	12	0	0	0	—		—		12	0	
Norwich City	2018–19	Championship	29	2	2	0	—		—		31	2	
Norwich City	2019–20	Premier League	9	0	1	0	—		—		10	0	
Norwich City	2020–21	Championship	0	0	0	0	0	0	—		0	0	
Norwich City	Total		50	2	3	0	0	0	0	0	53	2	—
Career total			184	7	11	0	12	0	2	0	209	7	—

== Honours ==
Borussia Dortmund

- Bundesliga: 2011–12
- DFB-Pokal: 2011–12
- UEFA Champions League runner-up: 2012–13

Norwich City

- EFL Championship: 2018–19
