= 2012–13 Borussia Dortmund season =

104th season in existence of Borussia Dortmund

Borussia Dortmund
2012–13 season
- President: Reinhard Rauball
- Head coach: Jürgen Klopp
- Stadium: Westfalenstadion
- Bundesliga: 2nd
- DFB-Pokal: Quarter-finals
- DFL-Supercup: Runners-up
- UEFA Champions League: Runners-up
- Top goalscorer: League: Robert Lewandowski (24); All: Robert Lewandowski (36)
- Highest home attendance: 80,645 vs Werder Bremen (24 August 2012)
- Lowest home attendance: 62,000 vs Manchester City (4 December 2012)
Home colours	Away colours	Third colours

The 2012–13 Borussia Dortmund season was the 104th season in the club's football history. In 2012–13 the club played in the Bundesliga, the top tier of German football. It was the club's 37th consecutive season in this league, having been promoted from the 2. Bundesliga in 1976.

== Review and events ==
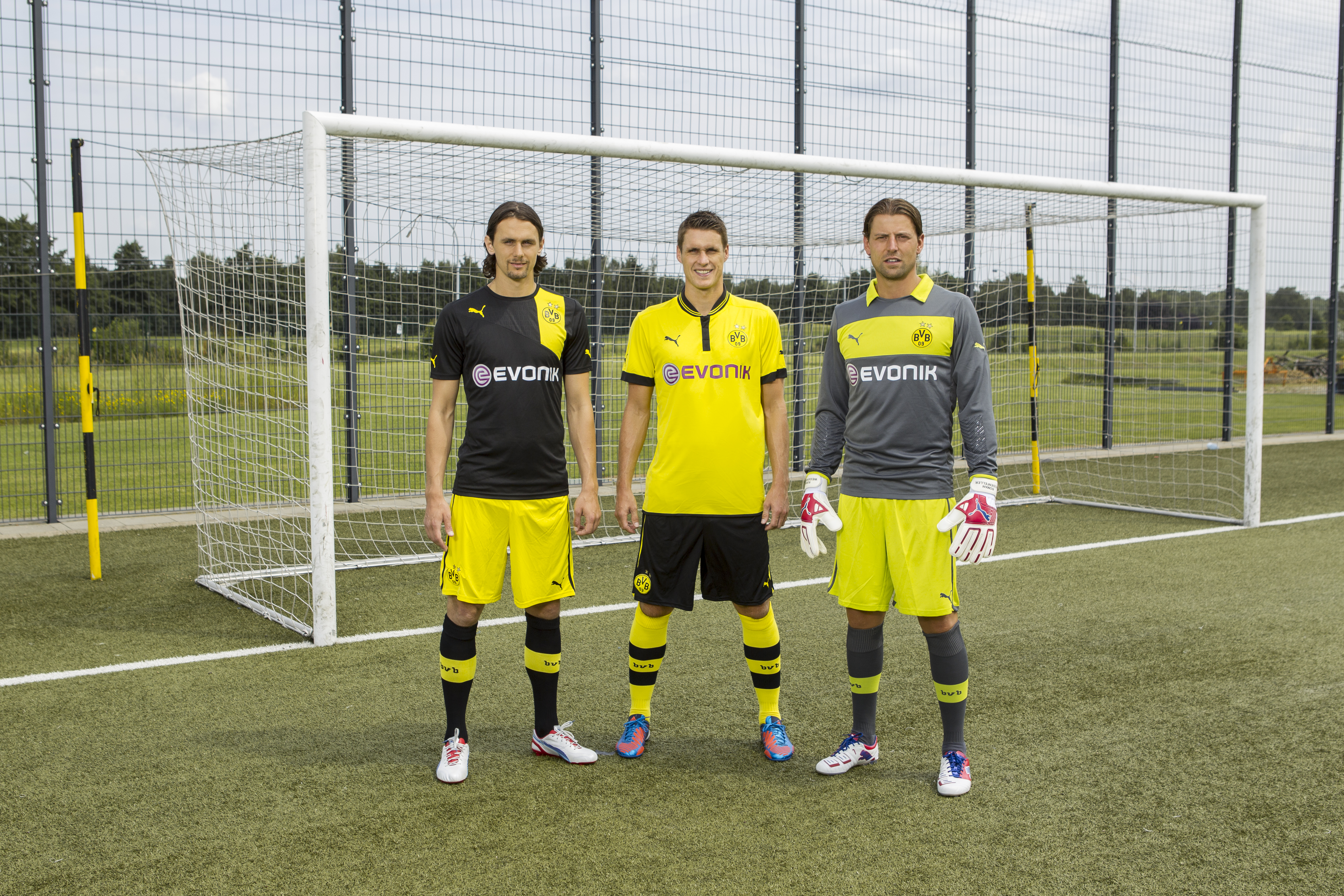
Neven Subotić, Sebastian Kehl and Roman Weidenfeller wearing BVB's new Puma colours.

The 2012–13 Borussia Dortmund season started on 18 August 2012 with a win against FC Oberneuland. Borussia Dortmund qualified for the 2012–13 UEFA Champions League and were tied in a group with Ajax, Manchester City and Real Madrid; despite being labelled the "group of death", they topped the group by three points. The club's opening league match was against Werder Bremen on 25 August and their opening Champions League match was against Ajax on 18 September. Hamburger SV end the club's 31-match unbeaten streak on 22 September. On 30 April, Borussia Dortmund reached the Champions League Final after defeating group stage opponents Real Madrid 4–3 on aggregate. However, Real Madrid manager José Mourinho was critical of referee Howard Webb not giving Mats Hummels a red card after handling the ball, claiming that he spared Hummels for the Final. On 25 May, in the first all-German Champions League Final, Dortmund lost 2–1 to Bayern Munich.

== Competitions ==
=== Overall ===
Competition	Started round	Current position / round	Final position / round	First match	Last match
DFL-Supercup	Final	—	Runners-up	12 August 2012	
Bundesliga	—	—	2nd	24 August 2012	18 May 2013
DFB-Pokal	Round 1	—	Quarter-finals	18 August 2012	27 February 2013
UEFA Champions League	Group stage	—	Runners-up	18 September 2012	25 May 2013

Updated to match played 25 May 2013
Source: Competitions

=== Friendlies ===
==== Pre-season ====
11 July 2012	SV Meppen	1–2	Borussia Dortmund	Meppen, Germany
18:45	Wigger 53'	Report	Amini 63'; Hofmann 77'	Stadium: MEP-Arena; Attendance: 10,558

14 July 2012	Club Brugge	3–1	Borussia Dortmund	Bruges, Belgium
14:30	Refaelov 4'; Jorgensen 18'; Vázquez 90'	Report	Bittencourt 25'	Stadium: Jan Breydel Stadium; Attendance: 24,000; Referee: Geldof (Belgium)

18 July 2012	Rot-Weiß Erfurt	0–4	Borussia Dortmund	Erfurt, Germany
19:00		Report	Schieber 14'; Durm 53'; Santana 72'; Leitner 76' (pen.)	Stadium: Steigerwaldstadion; Attendance: 15,601; Referee: Norbert Giese (Germany)

21 July 2012	1. FC Nürnberg	4–2	Borussia Dortmund	Nuremberg, Germany
16:00	Balitsch 30'; Mintál 44' (pen.); Polter 70'; Frantz 88'	Report	Kehl 15'; Błaszczykowski 62'	Stadium: Stadion Nürnberg; Attendance: 31,051; Referee: Deniz Aytekin (Germany)

25 July 2012	St. Gallen	1–2	Borussia Dortmund	St. Gallen, Switzerland
20:00	Čavušević 54'	Report	Lewandowski 18'; Großkreutz 82'	Stadium: AFG Arena; Attendance: 9,321; Referee: Adrien Jaccottet (Switzerland)

29 July 2012	Legia Warsaw	0–1	Borussia Dortmund	Warsaw, Poland
17:00		Report	Lewandowski 4'	Stadium: Pepsi Arena; Attendance: 10,000; Referee: Szymon Marciniak (Poland)

1 August 2012	Preußen Münster	2–4	Borussia Dortmund	Münster, Germany
19:00	Kühne 12' (pen.); Königs 33'	Report	Lewandowski 53', 63'; Perišić 56' (pen.); Piszczek 61'	Stadium: Preußenstadion; Attendance: 15,050

===== Liga-total-Cup =====
4 August 2012	Hamburger SV	0–1	Borussia Dortmund	Hamburg
16:45		Report	Błaszczykowski 42'	Stadium: Imtech Arena; Attendance: 41,000; Referee: Hans-Joachim Osmers (Germany)

5 August 2012	Borussia Dortmund	3–3 (4–5 p)	Werder Bremen	Hamburg
20:35	Reus 22'; Lewandowski 24', 25'		Füllkrug 3'; Ekici 5'; Hunt 49' (pen.)	Stadium: Imtech Arena; Attendance: 39,175; Referee: Felix Zwayer (Germany)
	Penalties
	Subotić (penalty missed); Halstenberg (penalty scored); Kehl (penalty scored); Owomoyela (penalty scored); Perišić (penalty scored); Großkreutz (penalty missed)		(penalty scored) Hunt; (penalty missed) Fritz; (penalty scored) Wurtz; (penalty scored) Junuzović; (penalty scored) Füllkrug; (penalty scored) Prödl

==== Mid-season friendlies ====
4 September 2012	Preußen Borghorst	0–7	Borussia Dortmund	Steinfurt, Germany
18:30		Report	Schieber 10'; Löwe 27' (pen.), 80'; Kehl 40'; Großkreutz 48'; Bakalorz 68'; Baykan 71'	Attendance: 3,500

7 September 2012	VfB Hüls	0–3	Borussia Dortmund	Marl, Germany
18:30		Report	Großkreutz 42'; Demirbay 70'; Löwe 80'	Stadium: Loekampstadion; Attendance: 1,350

10 October 2012	TuS Koblenz	1–2	Borussia Dortmund	Koblenz, Germany
19:00	Dzaka 41'	Report	Hofmann 75'; Schieber 87'	Stadium: Stadion Oberwerth; Attendance: 4,734

=== Bundesliga ===
==== League table ====
Pos	Team	Pld	W	D	L	GF	GA	GD	Pts	Qualification or relegation
1	Bayern Munich (C)	34	29	4	1	98	18	+80	91	Qualification for the Champions League group stage
2	Borussia Dortmund	34	19	9	6	81	42	+39	66	Qualification for the Champions League group stage
3	Bayer Leverkusen	34	19	8	7	65	39	+26	65	Qualification for the Champions League group stage
4	Schalke 04	34	16	7	11	58	50	+8	55	Qualification for the Champions League play-off round
5	SC Freiburg	34	14	9	11	45	40	+5	51	Qualification for the Europa League group stage

Source: Bundesliga.de, kicker.de
Rules for classification: 1) points; 2) goal difference; 3) number of goals scored.
(C) Champions

==== Results summary ====
Overall								Home						Away					
Pld	W	D	L	GF	GA	GD	Pts	W	D	L	GF	GA	GD	W	D	L	GF	GA	GD
34	19	9	6	80	42	+38	66	10	3	4	39	19	+20	9	6	2	41	23	+18

Last updated: 18 May 2013.
Source: Competitive matches

==== Results by round ====
Round	1	2	3	4	5	6	7	8	9	10	11	12	13	14	15	16	17	18	19	20	21	22	23	24	25	26	27	28	29	30	31	32	33	34
Ground	H	A	H	A	A	H	A	H	A	H	A	H	A	H	A	H	A	A	H	A	H	H	A	H	A	H	A	H	A	H	A	H	A	H
Result	W	D	W	L	D	W	D	L	W	D	W	W	W	D	D	L	W	W	W	W	L	W	D	W	L	W	W	W	W	W	W	D	D	L
Position	3	6	5	4	6	3	4	4	4	5	4	4	2	3	3	3	3	3	3	2	2	2	2	2	2	2	2	2	2	2	2	2	2	2

Updated to match(es) played on 18 May 2013. Source: Competitive matches
A = Away; H = Home; W = Win; D = Draw; L = Loss

==== Matches ====
24 August 2012 1	Borussia Dortmund	2–1	Werder Bremen	Dortmund
20:30	Reus 11'; Gündoğan (yellow card) 21'; Kehl (yellow card) 62'; Götze 81'	Report	Ignjovski (yellow card) 29'; Junuzović (yellow card) 59'; Gebre Selassie 75'	Stadium: Westfalenstadion; Attendance: 80,645; Referee: Felix Zwayer (Berlin)

1 September 2012 2	1. FC Nürnberg	1–1	Borussia Dortmund	Nuremberg
15:30	Pekhart 31'; Klose (yellow card) 65'; Balitsch (yellow card) 70'	Report	Błaszczykowski 40'; Piszczek (yellow card) 71'; Großkreutz (yellow card) 90'	Stadium: Stadion Nürnberg; Attendance: 50,000; Referee: Tobias Welz (Wiesbaden)

15 September 2012 3	Borussia Dortmund	3–0	Bayer Leverkusen	Dortmund
15:30	Hummels 29'; Błaszczykowski 39'; Schmelzer (yellow card) 71'; Lewandowski 78'	Report	Carvajal (yellow card) 72'; Wollscheid (yellow card) 78'	Stadium: Westfalenstadion; Attendance: 80,645; Referee: Felix Brych (Munich)

22 September 2012 4	Hamburger SV	3–2	Borussia Dortmund	Hamburg
15:30	Son 2', 59'; Van der Vaart (yellow card) 23'; Badelj (yellow card) 37'; Iličević 55'; Adler (yellow card) 90'	Report	Perišić 46', 60'; Schmelzer (yellow card) 90'	Stadium: Imtech Arena; Attendance: 57,000; Referee: Günter Perl

25 September 2012 5	Eintracht Frankfurt	3–3	Borussia Dortmund	Frankfurt
20:00	Aigner 49'; Inui 51'; Zambrano (yellow card) 58'; Anderson 73'; Schwegler (yellow card) 88'	Report	Piszczek 24'; Reus 28'; Götze 54'; Lewandowski (yellow card) 80'	Stadium: Commerzbank-Arena; Attendance: 51,500; Referee: Florian Meyer

29 September 2012 6	Borussia Dortmund	5–0	Borussia Mönchengladbach	Dortmund
18:30	Reus 35', 70'; Subotić 40'; Gündoğan 79'; Błaszczykowski 85'	Report	Nordtveit (yellow card) 90'	Stadium: Westfalenstadion; Attendance: 80,645; Referee: Wolfgang Stark (Ergolding)

7 October 2012 7	Hannover 96	1–1	Borussia Dortmund	Hannover
17:30	Sobiech (yellow card) 10'; Cherundolo (yellow card) 54'; Schlaudraff (yellow card) 79'; Stindl (yellow card) 82'; Diouf 86'	Report	Lewandowski 26'	Stadium: AWD-Arena; Attendance: 49,000; Referee: Peter Gagelmann

20 October 2012 8	Borussia Dortmund	1–2	Schalke 04	Dortmund
15:30	Lewandowski 55'		Afellay 14'; Höger 48'	Stadium: Westfalenstadion; Attendance: 80,645; Referee: Felix Brych (Munich)

27 October 2012 9	SC Freiburg	0–2	Borussia Dortmund	Freiburg
15:30			Subotić 54'; Götze 83'	Stadium: Mage Solar Stadion; Attendance: 24,000; Referee: Marco Fritz (Korb)

3 November 2012 10	Borussia Dortmund	0–0	VfB Stuttgart	Dortmund
15:30		Report		Stadium: Westfalenstadion; Attendance: 80,645; Referee: Felix Zwayer (Berlin)

10 November 2012 11	FC Augsburg	1–3	Borussia Dortmund	Augsburg
15:30	Langkamp (yellow card) 40'; Vogt (yellow card) 58'; Mölders 82'		Reus 9'; Bender; Lewandowski 51', 71'; Weidenfeller (yellow card) 86'	Stadium: SGL arena Attendance: 30,660; Referee: Manuel Gräfe (Berlin)

17 November 2012 12	Borussia Dortmund	3–1	Greuther Fürth	Dortmund
15:30	Lewandowski 3', 15' (pen.); Götze 42'		Stieber 5'	Stadium: Westfalenstadion; Attendance: 80,645; Referee: Dr. Jochen Drees (Münster-Sarmsheim)

24 November 2012 13	Mainz 05	1–2	Borussia Dortmund	Mainz
15:30	Caligiuri 4'		Lewandowski 11', 43'	Stadium: Coface Arena; Attendance: 34,000; Referee: Knut Kircher (Rottenburg)

27 November 2012 14	Borussia Dortmund	1–1	Fortuna Düsseldorf	Dortmund
20:00	Błaszczykowski 43'; Subotić (yellow card) 65'		Paurević (yellow card) 74' (yellow-red card) 87'; Reisinger 78'; Kruse (yellow card) 89'	Stadium: Westfalenstadion; Attendance: 80,100; Referee: Deniz Aytekin (Oberasbach)

1 December 2012 15	Bayern Munich	1–1	Borussia Dortmund	Munich
	Kroos 67'		Götze 74'	Stadium: Allianz Arena; Attendance: 71,000; Referee: Peter Gagelmann (Bremen)

8 December 2012 16	Borussia Dortmund	2–3	VfL Wolfsburg	Dortmund
15:30	Reus 6'; Schmelzer (red card) 35'; Reus (yellow card) 49'; Błaszczykowski 61' (pen.); Gündoğan (yellow card) 64'; Götze (yellow card) 83'		Diego 36' (pen.); Naldo 41'; Kjær (yellow card) 61'; Josué (yellow card) 63'; Dost 73'; Kahlenberg (yellow card) 90'	Stadium: Westfalenstadion; Attendance: 80,645; Referee: Wolfgang Stark

16 December 2012 17	1899 Hoffenheim	1–3	Borussia Dortmund	Sinsheim
15:30	Schipplock 35'; Weis (yellow card) 53'		Götze 26'; Großkreutz 58'; Lewandowski 66'	Stadium: Rhein-Neckar Arena; Attendance: 30,150; Referee: Florian Meyer (Burgdorf)

19 January 2013 18	Werder Bremen	0–5	Borussia Dortmund	Bremen
18:30			Reus 9'; Götze 19', (yellow card) 40'; Santana (yellow card) 38', (goal) 48'; Lewandowski 81'; Błaszczykowski 85'	Stadium: Weserstadion; Attendance: 42,100; Referee: Knut Kircher (Rottenburg)

25 January 2013 19	Borussia Dortmund	3–0	1. FC Nürnberg	Dortmund
20:30	Błaszczykowski 18' (pen.), 21'; Lewandowski 88'			Stadium: Westfalenstadion; Attendance: 80,100; Referee: Michael Weiner

3 February 2013 20	Bayer Leverkusen	2–3	Borussia Dortmund	Leverkusen
17:30	Leno (yellow card) 8'; Carvajal (yellow card) 54'; Reinartz 58', 62', (yellow card) 76'; Boenisch (yellow card) 67'; Toprak (yellow card) 75'		Reus 3'; Błaszczykowski 9' (pen.); Lewandowski 63'; Langerak (yellow card) 86'	Stadium: BayArena; Attendance: 30,210; Referee: Deniz Aytekin

9 February 2013 21	Borussia Dortmund	1–4	Hamburger SV	Dortmund
15:30	Lewandowski 17', (red card) 31'; Götze (yellow card) 82'		Rudņevs 18', 62'; Aogo (yellow card) 22'; Son 26', 89'; Van der Vaart (yellow card) 31'; Bruma (red card) 60'	Stadium: Westfalenstadion; Attendance: 80,645; Referee: Manuel Gräfe (Berlin)

16 February 2013 22	Borussia Dortmund	3–0	Eintracht Frankfurt	Dortmund
18:30	Reus 8', 10', 65'; Schieber (yellow card) 27' (yellow-red card) 31'; Subotić (yellow card) 51'; Hummels (yellow card) 89'		Lakić (yellow card) 43'; Inui (yellow card) 54' (yellow-red card) 74'	Stadium: Westfalenstadion; Attendance: 80,500; Referee: Felix Brych (Munich)

24 February 2013 23	Borussia Mönchengladbach	1–1	Borussia Dortmund	Mönchengladbach
15:30	Marx (yellow card) 26'; Ter Stegen (yellow card) 30'; Younes 67'; Jantschke (yellow card) 88'		Götze 31' (pen.); Santana (yellow card) 89'	Stadium: Borussia-Park; Attendance: 54,010; Referee: Günter Perl (Munich)

2 March 2013 24	Borussia Dortmund	3–1	Hannover 96	Dortmund
15:30	Lewandowski 8', 21'; Schieber 72'		Abdellaoue 41'; Schmiedebach (yellow card) 58'; Schulz (yellow card) 86'	Stadium: Westfalenstadion; Attendance: 80,645; Referee: Tobias Welz (Wiesbaden)

9 March 2013 25	Schalke 04	2–1	Borussia Dortmund	Gelsenkirchen
15:30	Draxler 12'; Huntelaar (yellow card) 32', (goal) 35'; Kolašinac (yellow card) 61'; Höger (yellow card) 90+1'		Lewandowski 59'	Stadium: Veltins-Arena; Attendance: 61,673; Referee: Peter Gagelmann (Bremen)

16 March 2013 26	Borussia Dortmund	5–1	SC Freiburg	Dortmund
15:30	Lewandowski 41', 45+1'; Şahin 45', 73'; Subotić (yellow card) 74'; Bittencourt 78'		Schmid 28'; Schuster (yellow card) 40'; Mujdža (yellow card) 79'	Stadium: Westfalenstadion; Attendance: 80,645; Referee: Michael Weiner (Ottenstein)

30 March 2013 27	VfB Stuttgart	1–2	BV Borussia Dortmund	Stuttgart
15:30	Harnik (yellow card) 23'; Niedermeier (yellow card) 33' (yellow-red card) 69'; Maxim 63'; Boka (yellow card) 81'		Piszczek 29'; Götze (yellow card) 70'; Lewandowski 82'; Großkreutz (yellow card) 84'	Stadium: Mercedes-Benz Arena; Attendance: 55,000; Referee: Deniz Aytekin (Oberasbach)

6 April 2013 28	Borussia Dortmund	4–2	FC Augsburg	Dortmund
15:30	Schieber 22', 52', (yellow card) 46'; Subotić 64'; Lewandowski 90+2'		Hahn (yellow card) 24'; Baier 43'; Vogt 45'; Klavan (yellow card) 76'	Stadium: Westfalenstadion; Attendance: 80,400; Referee: Markus Schmidt (Stuttgart)

13 April 2013 29	Greuther Fürth	1–6	Borussia Dortmund	Fürth
15:30	Prib 71'		Götze 12', 45'; Gündoğan 15', 33'; Błaszczykowski 28'; Santana (yellow card) 75'; Lewandowski 80'	Stadium: Trolli Arena; Attendance: 18,000; Referee: Marco Fritz (Korb)

20 April 2013 30	Borussia Dortmund	2–0	Mainz 05	Dortmund
15:30	Reus 1'; Reus (yellow card) 37'; Hummels (yellow card) 41'; Schmelzer (yellow card) 79'; Lewandowski 87'		Bell (yellow card) 68'; Zimling (yellow card) 78'; Wetklo (yellow card) 90'	Stadium: Westfalenstadion; Attendance: 80,000; Referee: Florian Meyer (Burgdorf)

27 April 2013 31	Fortuna Düsseldorf	1–2	Borussia Dortmund	Düsseldorf
18:30	Kruse (yellow card) 40'; Ilsø (yellow card) 50'; Van den Bergh (yellow card) 56'; Reisinger (yellow card) 74'; Bodzek 88'		Şahin 20'; Schieber (yellow card) 51'; Błaszczykowski 70'	Stadium: Esprit Arena; Attendance: 54,000; Referee: Michael Weiner (Ottenstein)

5 May 2013 32	Borussia Dortmund	1–1	Bayern Munich	Dortmund
18:30	Großkreutz 11'; Błaszczykowski (yellow card) 64'		Tymoshchuk (yellow card) 10'; Gómez 23'; Luiz Gustavo (yellow card) 39'; Boateng (yellow card) 45+1'; Rafinha (yellow card) 62' (yellow-red card) 64'; Can (yellow card) 85'	Stadium: Westfalenstadion; Attendance: 80,645; Referee: Peter Gagelmann (Bremen)

11 May 2013 33	VfL Wolfsburg	3–3	Borussia Dortmund	Wolfsburg
15:30	Perišić 14', 22'; Naldo 26'; Polák (yellow card) 63'		Bender 5'; Reus (yellow card) 44', (goal) 84', 87'; Gündoğan (yellow card) 62'	Stadium: Volkswagen Arena; Attendance: 30,000; Referee: Günter Perl (Pullach)

18 May 2013 34	Borussia Dortmund	1–2	1899 Hoffenheim	Dortmund
15:30	Lewandowski 6'; Weidenfeller (red card) 80'; Reus (yellow card) 85'		Rudy (yellow card) 26'; Vestergaard (yellow card) 30'; Schipplock (yellow card) 71'; Salihović 77' (pen.), 82' (pen.); Firmino (yellow card) 80'	Stadium: Westfalenstadion; Attendance: 80,645; Referee: Jochen Drees (Münster-Sarmsheim)

=== DFB-Pokal ===
18 August 2012 Round 1	FC Oberneuland	0–3	Borussia Dortmund	Bremen
15:30 CEST (UTC+02:00)		Report	Reus 11'; Błaszczykowski 39'; Perišić 68'	Stadium: Weserstadion; Attendance: 19,325; Referee: Florian Meyer (Burgdorf)

30 October 2012 Round 2	VfR Aalen	1–4	Borussia Dortmund	Aalen
20:30 CET (UTC+01:00)	Klauß 87'		Hummels 22'; Schmelzer 32'; Götze 50'; Schieber 79'	Stadium: Scholz-Arena; Attendance: 13,251; Referee: Günter Perl (Pullach)

19 December 2012 Round 3	Borussia Dortmund	5–1	Hannover 96	Dortmund
20:30 CET (UTC+01:00)	Götze 2', 40', 84'; Błaszczykowski 18'; Lewandowski 90'	Report	Diouf 79'	Stadium: Westfalenstadion; Attendance: 77,615; Referee: Felix Brych (Munich)

27 February 2013 Quarter-finals	Bayern Munich	1–0	Borussia Dortmund	Munich
20:30 CET (UTC+01:00)	Robben 43'; Martínez (yellow card) 63'; Kroos (yellow card) 67'; Mandžukić (yellow card) 78'			Stadium: Allianz Arena; Attendance: 71,000; Referee: Knut Kircher (Hirschau)

=== DFL-Supercup ===
12 August 2012	Bayern Munich	2–1	Borussia Dortmund	Munich
20:00 CEST (UTC+02:00)	Mandžukić 6', (yellow card) 68'; Müller 11'; Luiz Gustavo (yellow card) 28'; Can (yellow card) 38'; Robben (yellow card) 82'	Report	Schmelzer (yellow card) 42'; Lewandowski 75'	Stadium: Allianz Arena; Attendance: 69,000; Referee: Michael Weiner (Germany)

=== UEFA Champions League ===
==== Group stage ====
Pos	Team	Pld	W	D	L	GF	GA	GD	Pts	Qualification	DOR	RMA	AJX	MCI
1	(Germany) Borussia Dortmund	6	4	2	0	11	5	+6	14	Advance to knockout phase	—	2–1	1–0	1–0
2	(Spain) Real Madrid	6	3	2	1	15	9	+6	11	Advance to knockout phase	2–2	—	4–1	3–2
3	(Netherlands) Ajax	6	1	1	4	8	16	−8	4	Transfer to Europa League	1–4	1–4	—	3–1
4	(England) Manchester City	6	0	3	3	7	11	−4	3		1–1	1–1	2–2	—

Source: Soccerway

18 September 2012 1	Borussia Dortmund (Germany)	1–0	(Netherlands) Ajax	Dortmund, Germany
20:45 CEST (UTC+02:00)	Lewandowski 87'	Report	Sana (yellow card) 37'; Van Rhijn (yellow card) 57'	Stadium: Westfalenstadion; Attendance: 65,829; Referee: Paolo Tagliavento (Italy)

3 October 2012 2	Manchester City (England)	1–1	(Germany) Borussia Dortmund	Manchester, England
20:45 CEST (UTC+02:00)	Kompany (yellow card) 28'; Y. Touré (yellow card) 85'; Balotelli 90' (pen.)	Report	Błaszczykowski (yellow card) 58'; Reus 61', (yellow card) 90'	Stadium: City of Manchester Stadium; Attendance: 43,657; Referee: Pavel Královec (Czech Republic); Man of the Match: Joe Hart

24 October 2012 3	Borussia Dortmund (Germany)	2–1	(Spain) Real Madrid	Dortmund, Germany
20:45 CEST (UTC+02:00)	Lewandowski 36'; Schmelzer 64'; Gündoğan (yellow card) 90+3'	Report	Ronaldo 38'; Ramos (yellow card) 47'; Alonso (yellow card) 62'	Stadium: Westfalenstadion; Attendance: 65,829; Referee: Viktor Kassai (Hungary)

6 November 2012 4	Real Madrid (Spain)	2–2	(Germany) Borussia Dortmund	Madrid, Spain
20:45 CET (UTC+01:00)	Pepe 34'; Özil 89'	Report	Reus 28'; Arbeloa 45' (o.g.); Großkreutz (yellow card) 57'; Hummels (yellow card) 66'	Stadium: Santiago Bernabéu Stadium; Attendance: 74,932; Referee: Cüneyt Çakır (Turkey)

21 November 2012 5	Ajax (Netherlands)	1–4	(Germany) Borussia Dortmund	Amsterdam, Netherlands
20:45 CET (UTC+01:00)	Enoh (yellow card) 19'; Moisander (yellow card) 85'; Hoesen 87'	Report	Reus 8'; Götze 36', (yellow card) 53'; Lewandowski 43', 64'	Stadium: Amsterdam Arena; Attendance: 47,500; Referee: Pedro Proença (Portugal); Man of the Match: Mario Götze

4 December 2012 6	Borussia Dortmund (Germany)	1–0	(England) Manchester City	Dortmund, Germany
20:45 CET (UTC+01:00)	Schieber 57'	Report	García (yellow card) 30'; Barry (yellow card) 58'; Balotelli (yellow card) 90+2'	Stadium: Westfalenstadion; Attendance: 65,829; Referee: Milorad Mažić (Serbia); Man of the Match: Błaszczykowski

==== Knockout phase ====
===== Round of 16 =====
13 February 2013 First leg	Shakhtar Donetsk (Ukraine)	2–2	(Germany) Borussia Dortmund	Donetsk, Ukraine
20:45 CET (UTC+01:00)	Srna 31'; Douglas Costa 68'; Fernandinho (yellow card) 70'	Report	Lewandowski 41'; Hummels 87'	Stadium: Donbas Arena; Attendance: 49,050; Referee: Howard Webb (England)

5 March 2013 Second leg	Borussia Dortmund (Germany)	3–0 (5–2 agg.)	(Ukraine) Shakhtar Donetsk	Dortmund, Germany
20:45 CET (UTC+01:00)	Santana 31'; Götze 37'; Błaszczykowski 59'	Report	Kucher (yellow card) 15'	Stadium: Westfalenstadion; Attendance: 65,829; Referee: Damir Skomina (Slovenia)

===== Quarter-finals =====
3 April 2013 First leg	Málaga (Spain)	0–0	(Germany) Borussia Dortmund	Málaga, Spain
20:45 CEST (UTC+02:00)	Antunes (yellow card) 19'; Weligton (yellow card) 31'; Iturra (yellow card) 78'	Report	Großkreutz (yellow card) 17'	Stadium: La Rosaleda Stadium; Attendance: 28,963; Referee: Jonas Eriksson (Sweden)

9 April 2013 Second leg	Borussia Dortmund (Germany)	3–2 (3–2 agg.)	(Spain) Málaga	Dortmund, Germany
20:45 CEST (UTC+02:00)	Bender (yellow card) 10'; Lewandowski 40'; Schmelzer (yellow card) 60'; Reus 90+1'; Santana 90+3'	Report	Joaquín 25'; Gámez (yellow card) 62'; Eliseu 82'; Toulalan (yellow card) 88'	Stadium: Westfalenstadion; Attendance: 65,829; Referee: Craig Thomson (Scotland)

===== Semi-finals =====
24 April 2013 First leg	Borussia Dortmund (Germany)	4–1	(Spain) Real Madrid	Dortmund, Germany
20:45 CEST (UTC+02:00)	Lewandowski 8', 50', 55', 66' (pen.), (yellow card) 70'	Report	Ronaldo 43'; Khedira (yellow card) 54'; Özil (yellow card) 64'; Ramos (yellow card) 90+2'	Stadium: Westfalenstadion; Attendance: 65,829; Referee: Björn Kuipers (Netherlands); Man of the Match: Lewandowski

30 April 2013 Second leg	Real Madrid (Spain)	2–0 (3–4 agg.)	(Germany) Borussia Dortmund	Madrid, Spain
20:45 CEST (UTC+02:00)	Coentrão (yellow card) 26'; Higuaín (yellow card) 43'; Ramos (yellow card) 79', (goal) 88'; Khedira (yellow card) 81'; Benzema 83'	Report	Gündoğan (yellow card) 43'; Bender (yellow card) 45+1'; Weidenfeller (yellow card) 83'	Stadium: Santiago Bernabéu Stadium; Attendance: 69,429; Referee: Howard Webb (England)

===== Final =====
25 May 2013 Final	Borussia Dortmund (Germany)	1–2	(Germany) Bayern Munich	London, England
20:45 CEST (UTC+02:00)	Gündoğan 68' (pen.); Großkreutz (yellow card) 79'	Report	Dante (yellow card) 29'; Mandžukić 60'; Ribéry (yellow card) 73'; Robben 89'	Stadium: Wembley Stadium; Attendance: 86,299; Referee: Nicola Rizzoli (Italy); Man of the Match: Robben

== Squad information ==
N	Pos.	Nat.	Name	Age	EU	Since	App	Goals	Ends	Transfer fee	Notes
1	GK	(Germany)	Roman Weidenfeller (vice-captain)	46	EU	2002	346	0	2013	Free transfer	
4	CB	(Serbia)	Neven Subotić	37	EU	2008	191	15	2016	€0.8M	
5	DM	(Germany)	Sebastian Kehl (captain)	46	EU	2001	300	19	2013	€3.2M	
6	DM	(Germany)	Sven Bender	37	EU	2009	122	3	2017		
7	AM	(Germany)	Moritz Leitner	33	EU	2011	54	0	2015		
8	DM	(Germany)	İlkay Gündoğan	36	EU	2011	81	8	2015	€5.5M	Second nationality: Turkey
9	CF	(Poland)	Robert Lewandowski	38	EU	2010	139	75	2014	€4.75M	
10	AM	(Germany)	Mario Götze	34	EU	2009	116	30	2016	Youth system	
11	FW	(Germany)	Marco Reus	37	EU	2012	47	24	2017	€17M	Originally from youth system
15	CB	(Germany)	Mats Hummels	37	EU	2008	191	19	2017	€4M	
16	AM	(Poland)	Jakub Błaszczykowski	40	EU	2007	208	29	2016	€3M	
18	DM	(Turkey)	Nuri Şahin	38	EU	2013	19	3	2014	Youth system	Second nationality: Germany
19	AM	(Germany)	Kevin Großkreutz	38	EU	2009	163	24	2014		
20	GK	(Australia)	Mitchell Langerak	38	Non-EU	2010	9	0	2016		
21	DF	(Germany)	Oliver Kirch	44	EU	2012	6	0	2016	€0.35M	
23	CF	(Germany)	Julian Schieber	37	EU	2012	37	5	2016	€5.5M	
26	RB	(Poland)	Łukasz Piszczek	41	EU	2010	132	6	2017	free	
27	DF	(Brazil)	Felipe Santana	40	Non-EU	2008	113	8	2014	€2M	
29	LB	(Germany)	Marcel Schmelzer	38	EU	2007	172	3	2017	Youth system	

- Last updated: 25 May 2013
- Source: [], Players transfer, Wikipedia players' articles (for player numbers, appearances, and goals)
- Ordered by squad number.

=== Squad and statistics ===
As of 25 May 2013

No.	Pos	Nat	Player	Total		Bundesliga		DFB-Pokal		DFL-Supercup		Champions League	
No.	Pos	Nat	Player	Apps	Goals	Apps	Goals	Apps	Goals	Apps	Goals	Apps	Goals
1	GK	(Germany) GER	Roman Weidenfeller	49	0	31	0	4	0	1	0	13	0
3	DF	(Germany) GER	Marc Hornschuh	0	0	0	0	0	0	0	0	0	0
4	DF	(Serbia) SRB	Neven Subotić	41	3	25	3	4	0	1	0	11	0
5	MF	(Germany) GER	Sebastian Kehl	34	0	19+3	0	2+1	0	0	0	5+4	0
6	MF	(Germany) GER	Sven Bender	32	1	15+5	1	1	0	0	0	9+2	0
7	MF	(Germany) GER	Moritz Leitner	31	0	8+17	0	1	0	1	0	1+3	0
8	MF	(Germany) GER	İlkay Gündoğan	45	4	26+2	3	4	0	1	0	11+1	1
9	FW	(Poland) POL	Robert Lewandowski	49	36	29+2	24	4	1	1	1	12+1	10
10	MF	(Germany) GER	Mario Götze	44	16	23+5	10	3+1	4	0+1	0	11	2
11	FW	(Germany) GER	Marco Reus	49	19	27+5	14	3	1	1	0	13	4
14 (44 in Champions League)	MF	(Croatia) CRO	Ivan Perišić	23	3	5+9	2	2+1	1	0+1	0	1+4	0
15	DF	(Germany) GER	Mats Hummels	42	3	28	1	2	1	1	0	10+1	1
16	MF	(Poland) POL	Jakub Błaszczykowski	41	14	23+4	11	2+1	2	1	0	8+2	1
18	MF	(Turkey) TUR	Nuri Şahin	18	3	9+6	3	0	0	0	0	0+3	0
19	MF	(Germany) GER	Kevin Großkreutz	44	2	19+10	2	3+1	0	1	0	6+4	0
20	GK	(Australia) AUS	Mitchell Langerak	3	0	3	0	0	0	0	0	0	0
21	MF	(Germany) GER	Oliver Kirch	6	0	2+2	0	0	0	0	0	1+1	0
22	DF	(Germany) GER	Patrick Owomoyela	0	0	0	0	0	0	0	0	0	0
23	FW	(Germany) GER	Julian Schieber	37	5	6+17	3	0+4	1	0+1	0	1+8	1
24	DF	(Germany) GER	Chris Löwe	0	0	0	0	0	0	0	0	0	0
25	DF	(Germany) GER	Thomas Meißner	0	0	0	0	0	0	0	0	0	0
26	DF	(Poland) POL	Łukasz Piszczek	46	2	28+1	2	4	0	1	0	12	0
27	DF	(Brazil) BRA	Felipe Santana	31	3	15+6	1	2+1	0	0	0	5+2	2
28	MF	(Australia) AUS	Mustafa Amini	0	0	0	0	0	0	0	0	0	0
29	DF	(Germany) GER	Marcel Schmelzer	46	2	29	0	3	1	1	0	13	1
31	MF	(Germany) GER	Marvin Bakalorz	0	0	0	0	0	0	0	0	0	0
32	MF	(Germany) GER	Leonardo Bittencourt	7	1	2+3	1	0+1	0	0	0	0+1	0
33	GK	(Germany) GER	Zlatan Alomerović	0	0	0	0	0	0	0	0	0	0
34	FW	(Germany) GER	Marvin Ducksch	0	0	0	0	0	0	0	0	0	0
35	MF	(Germany) GER	Jonas Hofmann	3	0	2+1	0	0	0	0	0	0	0
38	MF	(Hungary) HUN	Bálint Bajner	1	0	0+1	0	0	0	0	0	0	0

=== Goal scorers ===
All competitions

Scorer	Goals
(Poland) Robert Lewandowski	36 (1)*
(Germany) Marco Reus	19
(Germany) Mario Götze	16
(Poland) Jakub Błaszczykowski	14
(Germany) Julian Schieber	5
(Germany) İlkay Gündoğan	4
(Serbia) Neven Subotić	3
(Croatia) Ivan Perišić	3
(Germany) Mats Hummels	3
(Turkey) Nuri Şahin	3
(Brazil) Felipe Santana	3
(Germany) Kevin Großkreutz	2
(Poland) Łukasz Piszczek	2
(Germany) Marcel Schmelzer	2
(Germany) Sven Bender	1
(Germany) Leonardo Bittencourt	1

Bundesliga

Scorer	Goals
(Poland) Robert Lewandowski	24
(Germany) Marco Reus	14
(Poland) Jakub Błaszczykowski	11
(Germany) Mario Götze	10
(Serbia) Neven Subotić	3
(Germany) İlkay Gündoğan	3
(Turkey) Nuri Şahin	3
(Germany) Julian Schieber	3
(Croatia) Ivan Perišić	2
(Germany) Kevin Großkreutz	2
(Poland) Łukasz Piszczek	2
(Germany) Sven Bender	1
(Germany) Mats Hummels	1
(Brazil) Felipe Santana	1
(Germany) Leonardo Bittencourt	1

DFB-Pokal

Scorer	Goals
(Germany) Mario Götze	4
(Poland) Jakub Błaszczykowski	2
(Poland) Robert Lewandowski	1
(Germany) Marco Reus	1
(Croatia) Ivan Perišić	1
(Germany) Mats Hummels	1
(Germany) Julian Schieber	1
(Germany) Marcel Schmelzer	1

Champions League

Scorer	Goals
(Poland) Robert Lewandowski	10
(Germany) Marco Reus	4
(Germany) Mario Götze	2
(Brazil) Felipe Santana	2
(Germany) İlkay Gündoğan	1
(Germany) Mats Hummels	1
(Poland) Jakub Błaszczykowski	1
(Germany) Julian Schieber	1
(Germany) Marcel Schmelzer	1

()* = Goals in DFL Supercup
Last updated: 26 May 2013

=== Transfers ===
In:

Out:

No.	Pos.	Nation	Player
11	FW	GER	Marco Reus (from Borussia Mönchengladbach)
21	MF	GER	Oliver Kirch (from 1. FC Kaiserslautern)
23	FW	GER	Julian Schieber (from VfB Stuttgart)
28	FW	AUS	Mustafa Amini (loan return from Central Coast Mariners)
32	MF	GER	Leonardo Bittencourt (from Energie Cottbus)

No.	Pos.	Nation	Player
2	DF	GER	Julian Koch (on loan to MSV Duisburg)
6	MF	GER	Florian Kringe (to FC St. Pauli)
8	MF	BRA	Antônio da Silva (to MSV Duisburg)
18	FW	PAR	Lucas Barrios (to Guangzhou Evergrande)
23	MF	JPN	Shinji Kagawa (to Manchester United)
37	FW	USA	Terrence Boyd (to Rapid Wien)
41	GK	GER	Johannes Focher (to Sturm Graz)
--	FW	GER	Marco Stiepermann (to Energie Cottbus, previously on loan at Alemannia Aachen)
--	DF	GER	Lasse Sobiech (on loan to Greuther Fürth, previously on loan at FC St. Pauli)
--	FW	GER	Daniel Ginczek (on loan to FC St. Pauli, previously on loan at VfL Bochum)
--	FW	BUL	Dimitar Rangelov (to Luzern, previously on loan at Energie Cottbus)

==== On loan ====
Note: Flags indicate national team as defined under FIFA eligibility rules; some limited exceptions apply. Players may hold more than one non-FIFA nationality.

No.	Pos.	Nation	Player
—	FW	GER	Daniel Ginczek (at FC St. Pauli until 30 June 2013)
—	DF	GER	Julian Koch (at MSV Duisburg until 30 June 2013)
—	DF	GER	Lasse Sobiech (at Greuther Fû until 30 June 2013)

For recent transfers, see List of German football transfers summer 2012 and List of German football transfers winter 2011–12.

=== Winter transfers ===
In:

No.	Pos.	Nation	Player
18	MID	TUR	Nuri Şahin (on loan from Real Madrid)

Out:

No.	Pos.	Nation	Player
14	MID	CRO	Ivan Perišić (to VfL Wolfsburg)
24	LB	GER	Chris Löwe (to 1. FC Kaiserslautern)
