= Julian Schieber =

German footballer

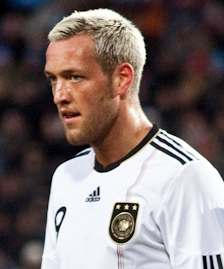
- Schieber playing for Germany U21 in 2010.

Personal information
- Full name: Julian Schieber
- Date of birth: 13 February 1989 (age 37)
- Place of birth: Backnang, West Germany
- Height: 1.86 m (6 ft 1 in)
- Position: Striker

Youth career
- SV Unterweissach
- 2005–2006: TSG Backnang
- 2006–2008: VfB Stuttgart

Senior career*
| Years | Team | Apps | (Gls) |
| 2008–2009 | VfB Stuttgart II | 23 | (13) |
| 2008–2012 | VfB Stuttgart | 49 | (6) |
| 2010–2011 | → 1. FC Nürnberg (loan) | 29 | (7) |
| 2012–2014 | Borussia Dortmund | 35 | (3) |
| 2014–2018 | Hertha BSC | 43 | (10) |
| 2018–2021 | FC Augsburg | 11 | (1) |
| Total | | 190 | (40) |

International career
| 2009–2010 | Germany U21 | 7 | (5) |
Medal record
Borussia Dortmund
| Runner-up | UEFA Champions League | 2013 |
| Winner | DFL-Supercup | 2013 |
- * Club domestic league appearances and goals as of 7 August 2021.

Julian Schieber (German pronunciation: [ˈjuːli̯an ˈʃiːbɐ]; born 13 February 1989) is a German retired footballer who played as a striker.

== Club career ==
=== VfB Stuttgart ===
Schieber made his Bundesliga debut in a match at Energie Cottbus on 6 December 2008. On 21 January 2009, he extended his contract at VfB Stuttgart until the summer of 2011.

In February 2009, Schieber played his first international (UEFA Cup) match for Stuttgart against FC Zenit St. Petersburg. On 15 August 2009, he scored his first Bundesliga goal in the Baden-Württemberg derby against SC Freiburg (final score 4–2). He also scored twice on 26 September 2009 in a match in Frankfurt am Main against Eintracht Frankfurt (final score 3–0).

In July 2010, Schieber was loaned out to 1. FC Nürnberg until the end of the season.

=== Borussia Dortmund ===
In the 2012–13 season, Schieber moved to Borussia Dortmund. On 4 December 2012, he scored his first European goal in a 1–0 win for Dortmund against Manchester City. In April 2013, Schieber scored two goals in a 4–2 win for Dortmund against FC Augsburg. In June, he and his team lost the final of the UEFA Champions League with a last-minute 2–1 against Bayern Munich.

On 27 July 2013, Schieber won the 2013 DFL-Supercup with Dortmund 4–2 against rivals Bayern Munich.

=== Hertha BSC ===
On 3 July 2014, he signed a 4-year contract with Hertha BSC. He scored his first goal in a 4–2 win against FC Viktoria Köln on 16 August 2014.

On 13 December, he scored the only goal of the game in a victory over his former club Dortmund, which pushed them into a relegation play-off place.

== International career ==
Schieber made his debut for the German under-21 team on 4 September 2009, against San Marino, he scored twice in a 6–0 win.

== Career statistics ==
As of matches played on 30 June 2018.

| Club | Season | League | | | Cup^{1} | | Continental^{2} | | Other^{3} | | Total | | Ref. |
| Club | Season | Division | Apps | Goals | Apps | Goals | Apps | Goals | Apps | Goals | Apps | Goals | Ref. |
|---|---|---|---|---|---|---|---|---|---|---|---|---|---|
| VfB Stuttgart | 2008–09 | Bundesliga | 12 | 0 | 0 | 0 | 1 | 0 | — | | 13 | 0 | |
| VfB Stuttgart | 2009–10 | Bundesliga | 19 | 3 | 3 | 1 | 7 | 0 | — | | 29 | 4 | |
| VfB Stuttgart | 2011–12 | Bundesliga | 18 | 3 | 2 | 0 | — | | — | | 20 | 3 | |
| VfB Stuttgart | Totals | | 49 | 6 | 5 | 1 | 8 | 0 | — | | 62 | 7 | — |
| VfB Stuttgart II | 2008–09 | 3. Liga | 18 | 9 | — | | | | | | 18 | 9 | |
| VfB Stuttgart II | 2009–10 | 3. Liga | 5 | 4 | — | | | | | | 5 | 4 | |
| VfB Stuttgart II | Totals | | 23 | 13 | — | | | | | | 23 | 13 | — |
| 1. FC Nürnberg (loan) | 2010–11 | Bundesliga | 29 | 7 | 4 | 3 | — | | | | 33 | 10 | |
| Borussia Dortmund | 2012–13 | Bundesliga | 23 | 3 | 4 | 1 | 9 | 1 | 1 | 0 | 37 | 5 | |
| Borussia Dortmund | 2013–14 | Bundesliga | 12 | 0 | 4 | 1 | 4 | 0 | 0 | 0 | 20 | 1 | |
| Borussia Dortmund | Totals | | 35 | 3 | 8 | 2 | 13 | 1 | 1 | 0 | 57 | 6 | — |
| Borussia Dortmund II | 2013–14 | 3. Liga | 1 | 0 | — | | — | | — | | 1 | 0 | |
| Hertha BSC | 2014–15 | Bundesliga | 16 | 7 | 2 | 1 | — | | — | | 18 | 8 | |
| Hertha BSC | 2015–16 | Bundesliga | 6 | 0 | 1 | 0 | — | | — | | 7 | 0 | |
| Hertha BSC | 2016–17 | Bundesliga | 18 | 3 | 3 | 0 | 1 | 0 | — | | 22 | 3 | |
| Hertha BSC | 2017–18 | Bundesliga | 3 | 0 | 1 | 1 | 0 | 0 | — | | 4 | 1 | |
| Hertha BSC | Totals | | 43 | 10 | 7 | 2 | 1 | 0 | — | | 51 | 12 | — |
| Hertha BSC II | 2017–18 | Regionalliga Nordost | 1 | 0 | — | | | | | | 1 | 0 | |
| Career totals | | | 180 | 39 | 24 | 8 | 22 | 1 | 1 | 0 | 227 | 49 | — |

- 1.Includes German Cup.
- 2.Includes UEFA Champions League and UEFA Europa League.
- 3.Includes German Super Cup.

== Honours ==
=== Club ===
Borussia Dortmund

- DFL-Supercup: 2013
- UEFA Champions League Runners-up: 2012–13
