= Mario Götze =

German footballer (born 1992)

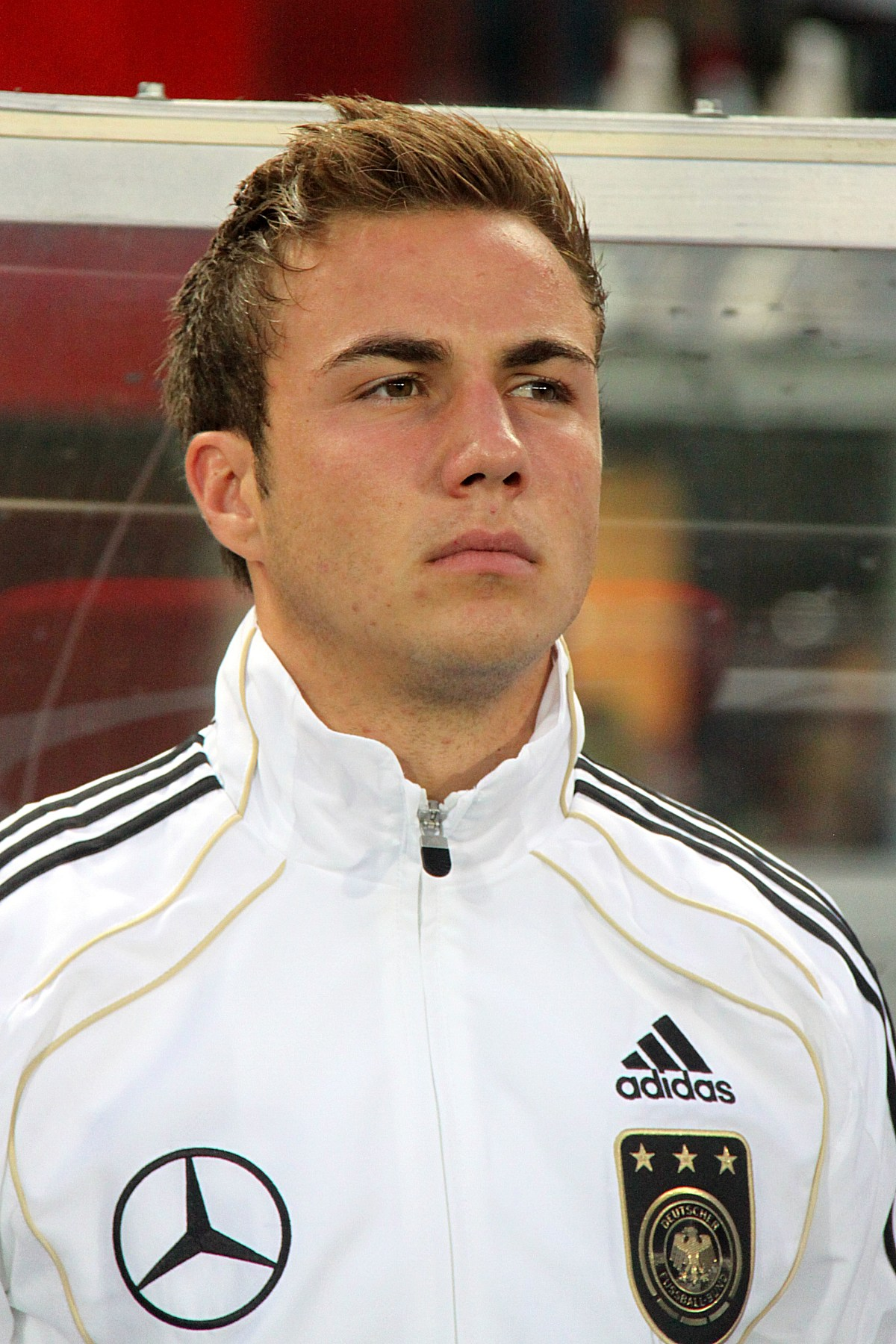
- Götze with Germany in 2011

Personal information
- Full name: Mario Götze
- Date of birth: 3 June 1992 (age 34)
- Place of birth: Memmingen, Germany
- Height: 1.76 m (5 ft 9 in)
- Positions: Attacking midfielder; winger; forward

Team information
- Current team: Eintracht Frankfurt
- Number: 27

Youth career
- 1995–1998: SC Ronsberg
- 1998–2001: FC Eintracht Hombruch
- 2001–2009: Borussia Dortmund

Senior career*
Years	Team	Apps	(Gls)
2009–2013	Borussia Dortmund	83	(22)
2013–2016	Bayern Munich	73	(22)
2016–2020	Borussia Dortmund	75	(13)
2020–2022	PSV Eindhoven	47	(9)
2022–	Eintracht Frankfurt	113	(9)

International career
2007	Germany U15	2	(0)
2007–2008	Germany U16	8	(3)
2008–2009	Germany U17	13	(5)
2009	Germany U21	2	(0)
2010–2023	Germany	66	(17)
Medal record
Men's football
Representing Germany
FIFA World Cup
Winner	2014 Brazil
UEFA European Championship
Third place	2012 Poland-Ukraine
UEFA European Under-17 Championship
Winner	2009 Germany
- * Club domestic league appearances and goals as of 19:30, 1 November 2026 (UTC)

Mario Götze (German pronunciation: [ˈmaːʁi̯o ˈɡœtsə]; born 3 June 1992) is a German professional footballer who plays as a midfielder or forward for Bundesliga club Eintracht Frankfurt.

He played for Borussia Dortmund between 2009 and 2013, winning the Bundesliga title in 2010–11 and the Bundesliga and DFB-Pokal double in 2011–12, and was a member of the team which reached the 2013 UEFA Champions League final. In April 2013, a €37 million bid from Bayern Munich triggered a release clause in Götze's contract, making him the second-most expensive German player at the time, behind Mesut Özil. He spent three seasons with the club where he won a further three league titles, two DFB-Pokal trophies and a winners' medal in each of the FIFA Club World Cup and UEFA Super Cup. He then returned to Dortmund in 2016, where he added another DFB-Pokal title and a DFL-Supercup to his name. He joined PSV Eindhoven in 2020, spending two seasons there before joining Eintracht Frankfurt.

Götze was first selected for the Germany national team in 2010, at the age of 18. He was included in the squad for UEFA Euro 2012 and, two years later, scored the winning goal in the 2014 FIFA World Cup final in Brazil. He also represented Germany at UEFA Euro 2016 and the 2022 World Cup.

== Club career ==
=== Borussia Dortmund ===
==== Early life ====
Götze is a product of Dortmund's youth academy, first entering the club as an eight-year-old. He made his Bundesliga debut on 21 November 2009 in a scoreless draw against Mainz 05, coming on as a substitute for Jakub Błaszczykowski in the 88th minute. During the winter break of the 2009–10 Bundesliga season, Dortmund manager Jürgen Klopp promoted Götze to the first team. He finished the 2009–10 season with five appearances. Götze took his chance and was an important player in Dortmund's Bundesliga-winning squad of the 2010–11 season. He finished 2010–11 season with eight goals in 41 appearances. In 2010, German Football Association's then technical director Matthias Sammer described Götze as "one of the best talents Germany has ever had."

He played in the 2011 German Super Cup' losing to Schalke 04. In January 2012, Götze was diagnosed with a hip injury; cartilage in Götze's hip had inflamed under stress.

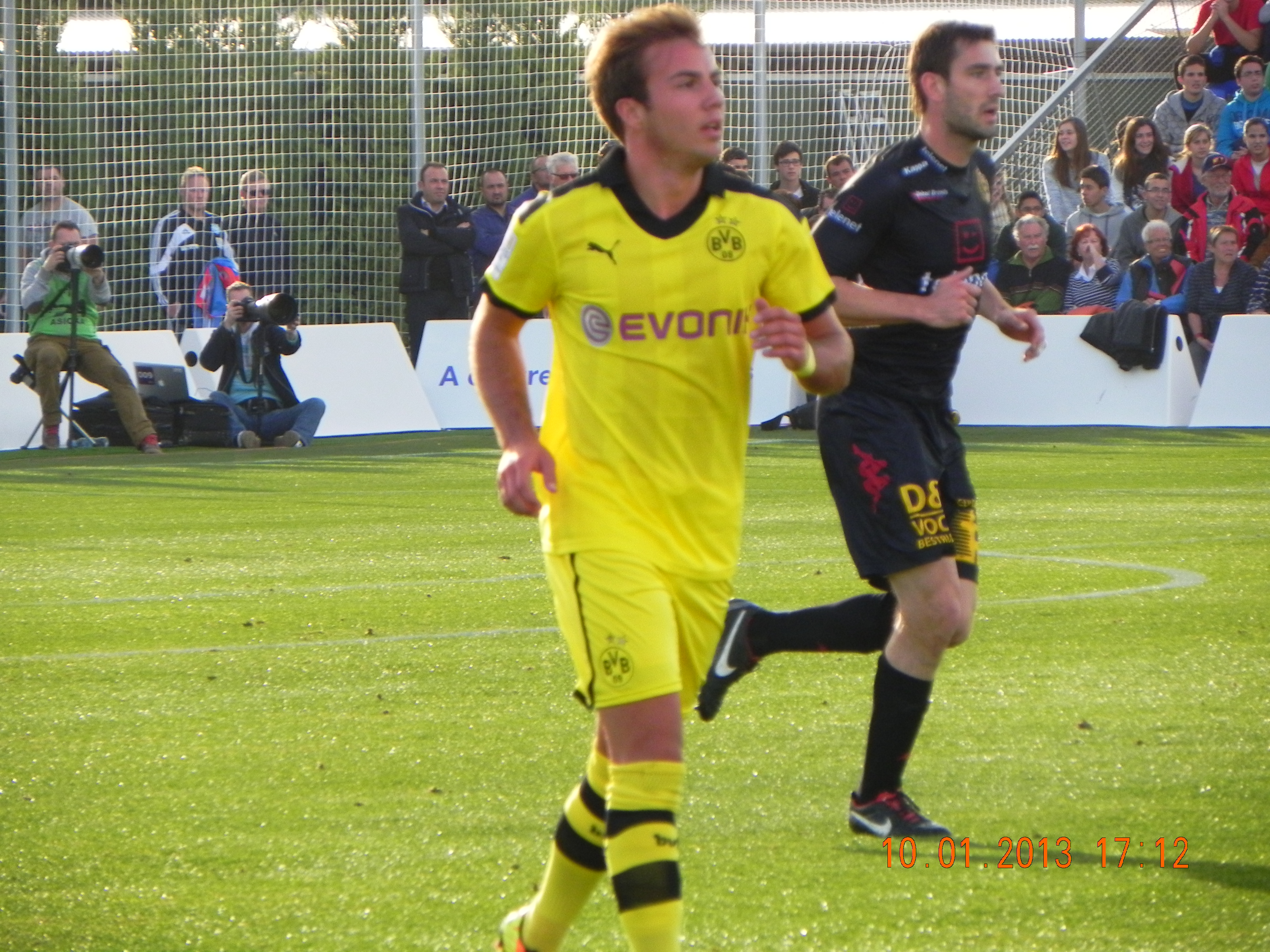
Götze playing for Borussia Dortmund in 2013

On 27 March 2012, Götze signed a new contract with Borussia Dortmund, keeping him at Dortmund until 2016. His contract, however, contained a release clause from the club, triggered by a fixed transfer fee of at least €37 million. Götze spoke about his contract extension, saying, "Everyone knows how comfortable I feel in Dortmund. The club are far from finished with their recent resurgence. And I want to be part of this development."

In April 2012, Götze made the squad for the first time since his hip injury but was an unused substitute against rivals Schalke 04. He played his first game since his hip injury when he came on as a substitute against Borussia Mönchengladbach.

Götze won the Bundesliga with Borussia Dortmund in 2012 as Dortmund set a Bundesliga record by earning the most points in a season with 81, a record later broken by Bayern Munich in 2012–13. Götze also won the DFB-Pokal with Dortmund (5–2) against rivals Bayern Munich in 2012. Götze finished the season with seven goals in all competitions.

==== 2012–13 season ====
Götze kicked off his season by losing the 2012 German Super Cup. On the first day of the 2012–13 season, he came on as a substitute and scored the winner against Werder Bremen in a 2–1 win for Dortmund. On 19 December, he netted a hat-trick, powering Dortmund to a 5–1 defeat of Hannover 96 in the third round of the DFB-Pokal.

At Barcelona Lionel Messi, Andrés Iniesta and Xavi are building a triangle, but as a classic duo there is nobody better than the prolific Reus and Götze. How they split Ajax in the Champions League impressed me. I hope they do not succeed in Munich.

— Former German captain and head coach Franz Beckenbauer on Reus and Götze partnership, December 2012

Götze provided an assist and netted a goal in Dortmund's 3–0 second leg defeat of Shakhtar Donetsk on 5 March 2013, completing a 5–2 aggregate victory over the Ukrainian champions as Dortmund progressed to the quarter-finals of the Champions League. The result meant that Dortmund had advanced to the quarter-finals for the first time in 15 years. Götze was ruled out of the final against Bayern Munich at Wembley Stadium, London, as he suffered thigh injury against Real Madrid in the second leg of the semi-final, which his side lost 2–0 but still progressed to the final through an aggregate score of 4–3. His Dortmund side lost the final 2–1 after a late Arjen Robben goal sealed Bayern's victory.

=== Bayern Munich ===
==== Signing ====
On 23 April 2013, it was announced that Götze was moving on 1 July 2013 to rivals Bayern Munich after the team had triggered Götze's release clause of €37 million. The transfer made Götze the most expensive German player of all time. Mesut Özil eventually broke the record later in the summer, transferring to Arsenal for €50 million. Dortmund coach Jürgen Klopp claimed that the reason behind Götze's transfer to Bayern was the playmaker's wish to play under manager Pep Guardiola, formerly of Barcelona. Klopp admitted his annoyance at the timing of the announcement of Götze's move, as it was barely 36 hours before Dortmund's Champions League semi-final with Real Madrid. Klopp later said that Dortmund had no chance of convincing Götze to stay with Dortmund, as he claimed, "He [Götze] is a Pep Guardiola favourite."

==== 2013–14 season ====
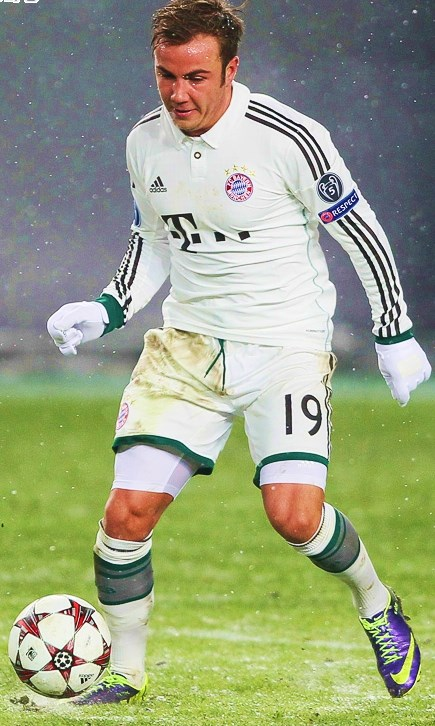
Götze playing for Bayern Munich in 2013

On 11 August 2013, Götze made his Bayern Munich debut, coming on as a substitute for Mitchell Weiser in the 60th minute. Götze netted two goals to help Bayern get a 4–1 win against Hungarian champions Győri ETO in a friendly match.

He made his league debut for the club in a Bundesliga home match against 1. FC Nürnberg on 24 August, which Bayern won 2–0. On 19 October, Götze came on as a substitute and made two assists to help Bayern from a one-goal deficit to get a 4–1 win against 1. FSV Mainz 05.

On 23 October, Götze scored his first competitive goal for Bayern in a 5–0 Champions League group stage win over Viktoria Plzeň at the Allianz Arena. He also assisted Bastian Schweinsteiger in the game. On 26 October 2013, Götze came on as a substitute for Toni Kroos in the 25th minute and scored his first Bundesliga goal for Bayern Munich with a header in a 3–2 win against Hertha BSC. On 2 November, he made his return to starting line-up in a 2–1 away win for Bayern against TSG 1899 Hoffenheim.

On 23 November, Götze came off the bench and scored the first goal of a 3–0 away victory over former club Borussia Dortmund. He did not celebrate the goal out of respect to Dortmund. In the team's next fixture against CSKA Moscow, Götze scored the second goal of 3–1 away win in the 2013–14 UEFA Champions League group stage.

On 7 December, Götze helped Bayern by netting a goal in the closing minute, as well as assisting Thomas Müller, in a dominant 7–0 away victory over Werder Bremen. Three days later, on 10 December, he'd score a goal against Manchester City in the UCL group phase, making it 2–0 in the 12th minute. On 17 December, Götze scored a long-range goal in the 47th minute against the AFC champion Guangzhou Evergrande, helping Bayern win 3–0 and advance to 2013 FIFA Club World Cup Final, where he came on as an 80th-minute substitute. Bayern won the match 2–0.

On 24 January 2014, Götze started as a "false 9" and scored his first goal in the second half of the season against Borussia Mönchengladbach, a 2–0 Bayern victory. On 25 March, he scored in a 3–1 win over Hertha BSC as Bayern were confirmed as Bundesliga champions. On 3 May 2014, he scored a brace and assisted two in their 4–1 away win against Hamburger SV. On 17 May, he played the full 120 minute match against former club Borussia Dortmund in 2014 DFB-Pokal Final. Bayern won 2–0 in extra time to win their second major title in the season. Götze's debut season with Bayern has yielded a mixture of success and frustration, scoring 15 goals.

==== 2014–15 season ====
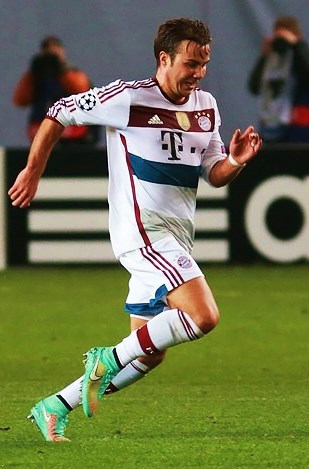
Götze playing for Bayern Münich in 2014

After helping Germany win the 2014 FIFA World Cup, Götze began the 2014–15 season on 14 August 2014, coming on as substitute in a 2–0 loss against Borussia Dortmund in 2014 DFL-Supercup. On 17 August, he opened his scoring account in their first 2014–15 DFB-Pokal win against SC Preußen Münster. On 22 August, he started and played for 62 minutes in their 2–1 home season opener victory against Wolfsburg. On 23 September, he scored twice in Bayern's 4–0 home win against SC Paderborn.

On 18 October, Götze netted another brace in their 6–0 home win against Werder Bremen. On 28 October, FIFA announced that Götze was included in the 23-man shortlist for 2014 FIFA Ballon d'Or. On 22 November, he scored a stylistic long range goal in their 4–0 win against Hoffenheim, later voted Bundesliga goal of the week. On 14 February 2015, Götze scored his third brace of the season and assisted one in their dominating 8–0 win against Hamburger SV.

On 28 April 2015, Götze was one of four Bayern players to miss in a 2–0 penalty shootout defeat to Borussia Dortmund in the DFB-Pokal semi-final. In May 2015, Franz Beckenbauer criticised Götze for poor performances and lack of determination in playing. After a couple of weeks, Götze's teammate Arjen Robben backed him up for all the negative criticism. "You need to make certain experiences as a player," the Netherlands international said. "How you cope with certain situations also makes you strong as a player. Criticism can be good for your development too. You need to fight through the situation." He finished the season with 15 goals in 48 appearances in all competitions.

==== 2015–16 season ====
On 1 August 2015, he started his season by coming on as a substitute in the 84th minute. On 9 August 2015, Götze scored with a goal in Bayern's 3–1 DFB-Pokal win over FC Nöttingen. In the next four games, he struggled to make a significant impact in the squad. On 16 September, Götze, coming on as a substitute in 79th minute, scored the second goal against Olympiacos in the 2015–16 Champions League as his club earned a 3–0 away win. After the game, Bayern coach Pep Guardiola praised Götze for his performance.

On 22 September 2015, Götze assisted the last goal in Bayern's 5–1 win against Wolfsburg. On 29 September, Götze was a threat throughout the whole game and he scored a goal against Croatian champions Dinamo Zagreb. Bayern earned a 5–0 win. On 4 October, Götze scored and assisted a goal against Borussia Dortmund to help Bayern to a 5–1 victory. He scored six goals in 21 appearances during the 2015–16 season.

=== Return to Borussia Dortmund ===
==== 2016–17 season ====
On 21 July 2016, Götze confirmed his return to Dortmund on a four-year contract. He also stated that he regretted his decision to join Bayern Munich three years before. On 11 September 2016, Götze played his official comeback in 1–0 loss against RB Leipzig. Despite the loss, he was praised for his promising return. Three days later, he scored his first goal for Dortmund since his return to his boyhood club, with his previous goal in a competitive game for the club coming in the 6–1 Bundesliga win over Greuther Furth in April 2013. He scored the opener of the historic 6–0 away win against Legia Warszawa in the Champions League group stage.

After a long time of re-adapting to the Dortmund system, Götze managed to find his form when their side faced Bayern Munich on 20 November 2016. Götze assisted the only goal of the game, and earned a 1–0 victory. Almost a month later, he scored his first Bundesliga goal since his return to Dortmund in a 2–2 draw against TSG 1899 Hoffenheim. In February 2017, Götze was dropped from the Dortmund team with a mystery illness, identified in media reports as myopathy, a metabolic disease which can cause fatigue and weight gain. The illness was said to explain some of Götze's fitness problems over the previous several seasons with Bayern and on his return to Dortmund. He finished the season with two goals in 16 appearances.

==== 2017–18 season ====
After his absence due to metabolic illness, Götze returned to the field on 14 July 2017 where Dortmund successfully defeated Urawa Reds 3–2 in a friendly match. On 19 August 2017, he made his first start in seven months in a 3–0 away win against VfL Wolfsburg to start their 2017–18 Bundesliga season; he assisted a goal, and played industriously. After the match, Dortmund's coach Peter Bosz hailed Götze's performance, but stated that he needs to be careful with his midfielder in order to gain full recovery. He finished the season with two goals in 32 appearances.

==== 2018–19 season ====
On 9 February 2019, Götze scored his 50th Bundesliga goal in a 3–3 draw with Hoffenheim, extending his record of never having lost a match in which he scored to 43 matches.

==== 2019–20 season ====
On the opening day of the 2019–20 Bundesliga campaign, Götze made his 200th competitive appearance for Dortmund, coming on as a second-half substitute for Reus in a 5–1 win over Augsburg.

On 23 May 2020, Borussia Dortmund sporting director Michael Zorc stated that Götze would leave the club at the end of the season. His last appearance for the team was in a 1–0 defeat against Bayern Munich, three days later after his decision to leave. He bid farewell to the club at the Westfalenstadion prior to Dortmund's final match against 1899 Hoffenheim.

=== PSV ===
On 6 October 2020, Götze joined PSV on a free transfer, signing a two-year deal. Götze scored on his PSV debut, a 3–0 away win at PEC Zwolle on 18 October. Götze was described by kicker as the best player in the Eredivisie after his first few months, but his season was affected by injuries.

On 21 July 2021, Götze scored twice against Galatasaray in the first leg of their UEFA Champions League second qualifying round tie. On 7 August, Götze scored in a 4–0 Johan Cruyff Shield win over rivals Ajax, in turn helping to end Ajax's 17 game unbeaten streak.

On 6 September 2021, Götze signed a new contract with PSV, keeping him at the club until 2024.

=== Eintracht Frankfurt ===
On 21 June 2022, Götze signed a three-year contract with Eintracht Frankfurt. Later that year, on 28 August, he scored his first goal in a 4–3 away win over Werder Bremen. On 2 June 2023, he extended his contract with the club until 2026.

On 27 October 2024, he made his 300th Bundesliga appearance, scoring in a 1–1 away draw against Union Berlin. On 13 March 2025, Götze scored his first European goals for Frankfurt, in a 4–1 win over Ajax Amsterdam in the UEFA Europa League. While his first goal resembled his 2014 World Cup final goal against Argentina, his second goal was scored from 40 metres afar.

On 1 April 2026, he renewed his contract with the club until 2028.

== International career ==
=== Senior career ===
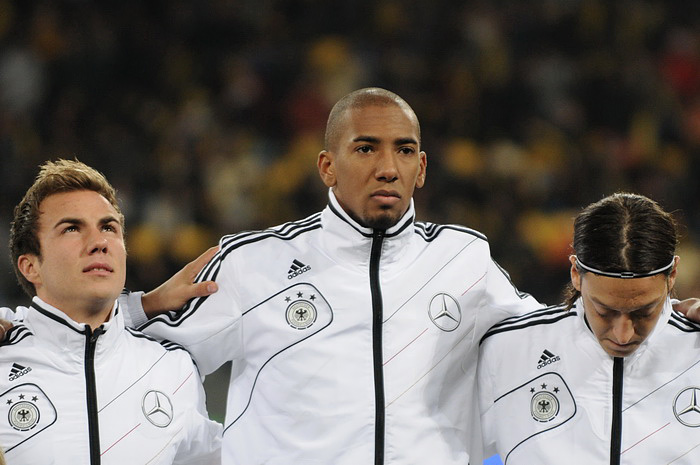
Götze (left) lining up for Germany with Jérôme Boateng (centre) and Mesut Özil (right) in 2011

After ascending through several youth teams, Götze was called up for his first senior match for Germany against Sweden, on 17 November 2010. He made his debut that day, coming on in the 78th minute in a goalless draw, substituting for his Dortmund teammate Kevin Großkreutz and becoming the youngest German international since Uwe Seeler. Götze and André Schürrle, who came on simultaneously, are the first two German players to be born in reunified Germany. He made his second appearance for the national team in a friendly match against Italy on 9 February 2011.

Götze's first goal for Germany was against Brazil on 10 August 2011; at 19 years and 68 days, he became the joint-youngest goalscorer for the Germany national team in the post-war era along with Klaus Stürmer, who scored on debut against France on 16 October 1954. He was included in the 23-man squad for UEFA Euro 2012 on 28 May 2012. Götze made his tournament debut in a 4–2 victory after coming on as a substitute in the 80th minute against Greece.

=== 2014 World Cup ===
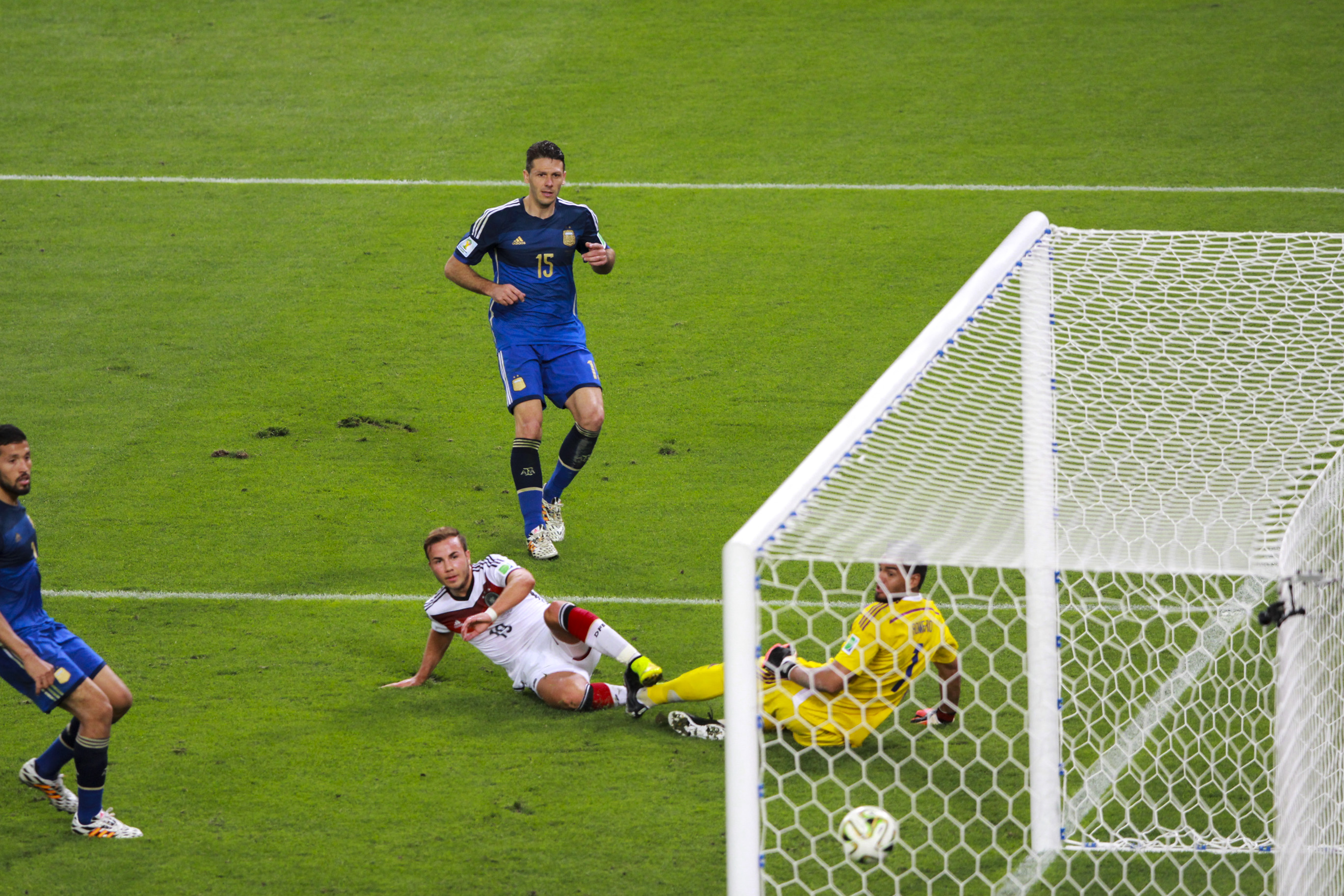
Götze beats Argentina's Sergio Romero (in yellow) to score the winning goal for Germany as Ezequiel Garay (left) and Martín Demichelis (centre) look on during the 2014 World Cup final.

Götze contributed four goals in 2014 FIFA World Cup qualifying, and was named in Germany's squad for the tournament finals. Götze was named in the starting line-up against Portugal in the team's opening match, winning the penalty kick for Germany's opening goal on his World Cup debut. In the team's second match, he scored the opening goal and was named the Man of the Match in a 2–2 draw with Ghana. Götze played just 14 minutes in the 1–0 win against the United States, half of the Round of 16 win against Algeria and seven minutes in their quarter-final 1–0 win over France. He did not play in Germany's record-breaking 7–1 victory against Brazil in the semi-finals.

In the World Cup final against Argentina, German Manager Joachim Löw substituted 36-year-old Miroslav Klose after 88 minutes with Götze and told him, "Show the world you are better than Messi and can decide the World Cup." Götze scored the only goal of the match in the 113th minute, controlling André Schürrle's cross on his chest before volleying the ball into the net, giving Germany their fourth World Cup. He became the first substitute to score a World Cup winning goal, and the youngest player to score in a World Cup Final since fellow German Wolfgang Weber in 1966, who was also 22. Götze was also named the Man of the Match.

=== Euro 2016, hiatus and 2022 World Cup ===
Götze featured at UEFA Euro 2016, appearing in four matches of Germany's semifinalists campaign. Having started every group game, he played just over 20 minutes in the knockout phase. Pundits widely criticised his performances for being nondescript. During this time, Götze also took part in a collaboration between the German Football Association and The LEGO Group, who in May 2016 released a Europe-exclusive collectible minifigure series, with Götze featured as the fifteenth of sixteen minifigures in the collection.

In the lead up to the 2018 FIFA World Cup, he played in a friendly against France in November 2017 after a one-year absence from the national team, but ultimately did not make the squad for the final tournament.

On 10 November 2022, Götze was named in Germany's 2022 FIFA World Cup squad by manager Hansi Flick. The selection was met with surprise, as it marked his return to the national side after five years. He would only play 34 minutes in the entire tournament, featuring in Germany's first and last group stage matches against Japan and Costa Rica as a substitute. Germany would not qualify for the knockout phase. His last match for the national team was on 25 March 2023, playing the second half in a 2–0 friendly win over Peru, getting subbed on for Florian Wirtz.

== Style of play ==
Götze is capable of playing as either a left or right winger, attacking midfielder and also as a "false 9". Götze was considered to be one of the best young players in the world, possessing speed, technique, dribbling skills and playmaking capabilities. In his first stint at Dortmund, under manager Jürgen Klopp, Götze often played different roles in the team's 4–2–3–1 formation. Following the departure of fellow playmaker Shinji Kagawa in 2012, during the 2012–13 season, Klopp assigned Götze as central attacking midfielder. For Germany, Götze's talent has been used by German coach Joachim Löw in the "false 9" role. In more recent seasons with Dortmund, coach Lucien Favre has also used Götze in this role.

In 2010, the German Football Association's then-Technical Director Matthias Sammer described Götze as "one of the best talents Germany has ever had." One year later, German football legend Franz Beckenbauer described Götze as "German Messi" for his speed and style of play. However, Götze's pace deteriorated before the peak age of an average professional footballer, and this was seen as one of the reasons for his second departure from Borussia Dortmund. In 2012, Franz Beckenbauer spoke about Götze, along with Marco Reus, saying, "...as a classic duo there is nobody better than the prolific Götze and Reus."

== Outside football ==
=== Personal life ===
Götze was born in Memmingen, Bavaria to parents Jürgen and Astrid Götze. His father is a professor at the Dortmund University of Technology. As a result of his father’s profession, Götze spent 18 months in the United States while his father collaborated on a paper for Rice University. His older brother Fabian, is former professional footballer who left Dortmund's youth system in 2010. Their younger brother, Felix, currently plays for SC Paderborn.

Götze has been in a relationship with German lingerie model Ann-Kathrin Brömmel since July 2012. The couple were engaged in 2017 and married in May 2018. They had a son in 2020 and a daughter in 2023. Götze is Christian.

=== Health problems ===
In early March 2017, it was reported that Götze had been suffering from a metabolic disorder. The health condition was later found out to be myopathy, a muscular disorder which affects the fibres in the muscles, meaning they do not function correctly.

Speaking about discovering the health condition Götze released a statement via the Borussia Dortmund official website which read, "I'm currently undergoing treatment and will do everything in my power to be back in training and helping my team to achieve our common goals as soon as possible".

=== Sponsorship ===
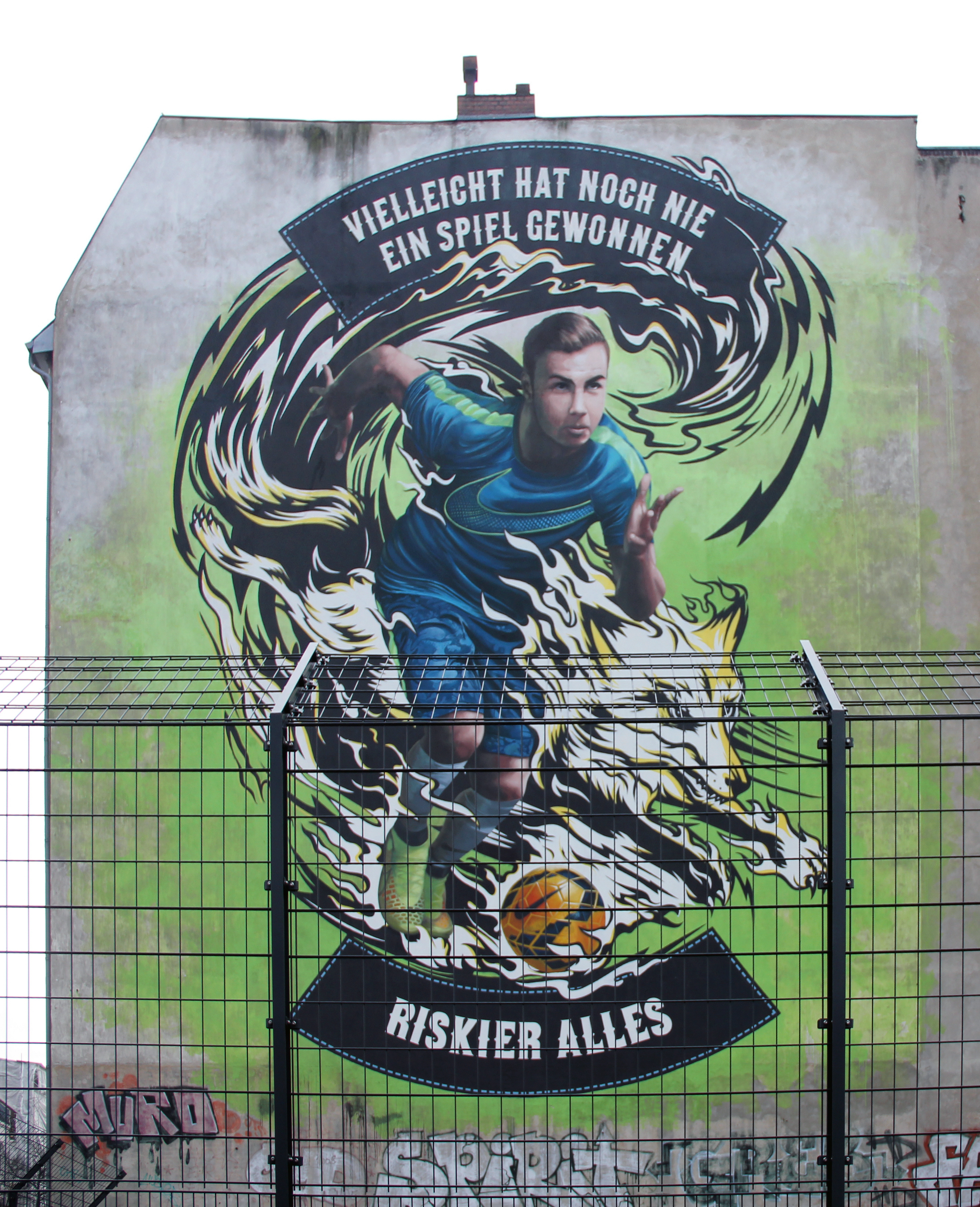
Mural of Götze commissioned by Nike in Charlottenburg, Berlin

In 2011, Götze signed a sponsorship kit deal with sportswear and equipment supplier Nike. He appeared in an advert for the Nike Green Speed II alongside Eden Hazard, Theo Walcott, Raheem Sterling, Christian Eriksen and Stephan El Shaarawy in November 2012. In March 2014, Götze was one of the first players to wear Nike Magista boots.

Götze appeared as part of a Galaxy XI in an advertisement for South Korean company Samsung alongside Cristiano Ronaldo, Lionel Messi, Wayne Rooney, Radamel Falcao and Iker Casillas in a team managed by former German international defender Franz Beckenbauer. On 14 August 2014, Konami announced that they had featured Götze on the front cover of Pro Evolution Soccer 2015.

== Career statistics ==
=== Club ===
As of match played 1 November 2026

Appearances and goals by club, season and competition
Club	Season	League			National cup (Note: Includes DFB-Pokal, KNVB Cup)		Europe		Other		Total	
Club	Season	Division	Apps	Goals	Apps	Goals	Apps	Goals	Apps	Goals	Apps	Goals
Borussia Dortmund	2009–10	Bundesliga	5	0	0	0	—		—		5	0
Borussia Dortmund	2010–11	Bundesliga	33	6	2	0	6 (Note: Appearances in UEFA Europa League)	2	—		41	8
Borussia Dortmund	2011–12	Bundesliga	17	6	2	1	6 (Note: Appearances in UEFA Champions League)	0	1 (Note: Appearance in DFL-Supercup)	0	26	7
Borussia Dortmund	2012–13	Bundesliga	28	10	4	4	11	2	1	0	44	16
Borussia Dortmund	Total		83	22	8	5	23	4	2	0	116	31
Bayern Munich	2013–14	Bundesliga	27	10	4	1	11	3	3 (Note: One appearance in UEFA Super Cup, two appearances and one goal in FIFA Club World Cup)	1	45	15
Bayern Munich	2014–15	Bundesliga	32	9	4	2	11	4	1	0	48	15
Bayern Munich	2015–16	Bundesliga	14	3	2	1	4	2	1	0	21	6
Bayern Munich	Total		73	22	10	4	26	9	5	1	114	36
Borussia Dortmund	2016–17	Bundesliga	11	1	1	0	4	1	0	0	16	2
Borussia Dortmund	2017–18	Bundesliga	23	2	0	0	9	0	0	0	32	2
Borussia Dortmund	2018–19	Bundesliga	26	7	2	0	6	0	—		34	7
Borussia Dortmund	2019–20	Bundesliga	15	3	2	0	4	0	0	0	21	3
Borussia Dortmund	Total		75	13	5	0	23	1	0	0	103	14
PSV Eindhoven	2020–21	Eredivisie	18	5	1	0	6	1	—		25	6
PSV Eindhoven	2021–22	Eredivisie	29	4	5	2	17 (Note: Six appearances and three goals in UEFA Champions League, five appearances and one goal in UEFA Europa League, six appearances and one goal in UEFA Europa Conference League)	5	1 (Note: Appearance in Johan Cruyff Shield)	1	52	12
PSV Eindhoven	Total		47	9	6	2	23	6	1	1	77	18
Eintracht Frankfurt	2022–23	Bundesliga	32	3	6	0	7	0	1 (Note: Appearance in UEFA Super Cup)	0	46	3
Eintracht Frankfurt	2023–24	Bundesliga	30	3	2	1	9 (Note: Appearances in UEFA Europa Conference League)	0	—		41	4
Eintracht Frankfurt	2024–25	Bundesliga	24	3	3	0	8	2	—		35	5
Eintracht Frankfurt	2025–26	Bundesliga	21	0	1	0	7	0	—		29	0
Eintracht Frankfurt	2026–27	Bundesliga	6	0	2	1	—		—		8	1
Eintracht Frankfurt	Total		113	9	14	2	31	2	1	0	159	13
Career total			391	75	43	13	125	21	11	2	568	112

=== International ===
Appearances and goals by national team and year
National team	Year	Apps	Goals
Germany	2010	1	0
Germany	2011	11	2
Germany	2012	8	1
Germany	2013	6	3
Germany	2014	15	7
Germany	2015	7	3
Germany	2016	14	1
Germany	2017	1	0
Germany	2018	0	0
Germany	2019	0	0
Germany	2020	0	0
Germany	2021	0	0
Germany	2022	2	0
Germany	2023	1	0
Total		66	17

Scores and results list Germany's goal tally first, score column indicates score after each Götze goal.

List of international goals scored by Mario Götze
No.	Date	Venue	Opponent	Score	Result	Competition
1	10 August 2011	Mercedes-Benz Arena, Stuttgart, Germany	Brazil	2–0	3–2	Friendly
2	2 September 2011	Veltins-Arena, Gelsenkirchen, Germany	Austria	6–2	6–2	UEFA Euro 2012 qualifying
3	7 September 2012	AWD-Arena, Hanover, Germany	Faroe Islands	1–0	3–0	2014 FIFA World Cup qualification
4	22 March 2013	Astana Arena, Astana, Kazakhstan	Kazakhstan	2–0	3–0	2014 FIFA World Cup qualification
5	26 March 2013	Frankenstadion, Nuremberg, Germany	Kazakhstan	2–0	4–1	2014 FIFA World Cup qualification
6	15 October 2013	Friends Arena, Solna, Sweden	Sweden	2–2	5–3	2014 FIFA World Cup qualification
7	5 March 2014	Mercedes-Benz Arena, Stuttgart, Germany	Chile	1–0	1–0	Friendly
8	6 June 2014	Coface Arena, Mainz, Germany	Armenia	5–1	6–1	Friendly
9	6 June 2014	Coface Arena, Mainz, Germany	Armenia	6–1	6–1	Friendly
10	21 June 2014	Castelão, Fortaleza, Brazil	Ghana	1–0	2–2	2014 FIFA World Cup
11	13 July 2014	Estádio do Maracanã, Rio de Janeiro, Brazil	Argentina	1–0	1–0 (a.e.t.)	2014 FIFA World Cup
12	3 September 2014	Esprit Arena, Düsseldorf, Germany	Argentina	2–4	2–4	Friendly
13	14 November 2014	Frankenstadion, Nuremberg, Germany	Gibraltar	3–0	4–0	UEFA Euro 2016 qualifying
14	10 June 2015	RheinEnergieStadion, Cologne, Germany	United States	1–0	1–2	Friendly
15	4 September 2015	Commerzbank-Arena, Frankfurt, Germany	Poland	2–0	3–1	UEFA Euro 2016 qualifying
16	4 September 2015	Commerzbank-Arena, Frankfurt, Germany	Poland	3–1	3–1	UEFA Euro 2016 qualifying
17	29 March 2016	Allianz Arena, Munich, Germany	Italy	2–0	4–1	Friendly

== Honours ==
Borussia Dortmund

- Bundesliga: 2010–11, 2011–12
- DFB-Pokal: 2011–12, 2016–17
- DFL-Supercup: 2019
- UEFA Champions League runner-up: 2012–13

Bayern Munich

- Bundesliga: 2013–14, 2014–15, 2015–16
- DFB-Pokal: 2013–14, 2015–16
- UEFA Super Cup: 2013
- FIFA Club World Cup: 2013

PSV Eindhoven

- KNVB Cup: 2021–22
- Johan Cruyff Shield: 2021

Eintracht Frankfurt

- DFB-Pokal runner-up: 2022–23
- UEFA Super Cup runner-up: 2022

Germany U17

- UEFA European Under-17 Championship: 2009

Germany

- FIFA World Cup: 2014
- UEFA European Championship bronze: 2012

Individual

- Ballon d'Or: 2014 (15th place)
- UEFA European Under-17 Football Championship Golden Player: 2009
- UEFA European Under-17 Football Championship Team of the tournament: 2009
- Fritz Walter Medal: U17 Gold Medal 2009
- Fritz Walter Medal: U18 Gold Medal 2010
- Bundesliga Young Player of the Year: 2010–11
- kicker Bundesliga Team of the Season: 2010–11, 2012–13
- VDV Newcomer of the Season: 2010–11
- Golden Boy: 2011
- Goal of the Month (Germany): July 2014
- Goal of the Year (Germany): 2014

Orders

- Silbernes Lorbeerblatt: 2014
