= Christian Eigler =

German footballer (born 1984)

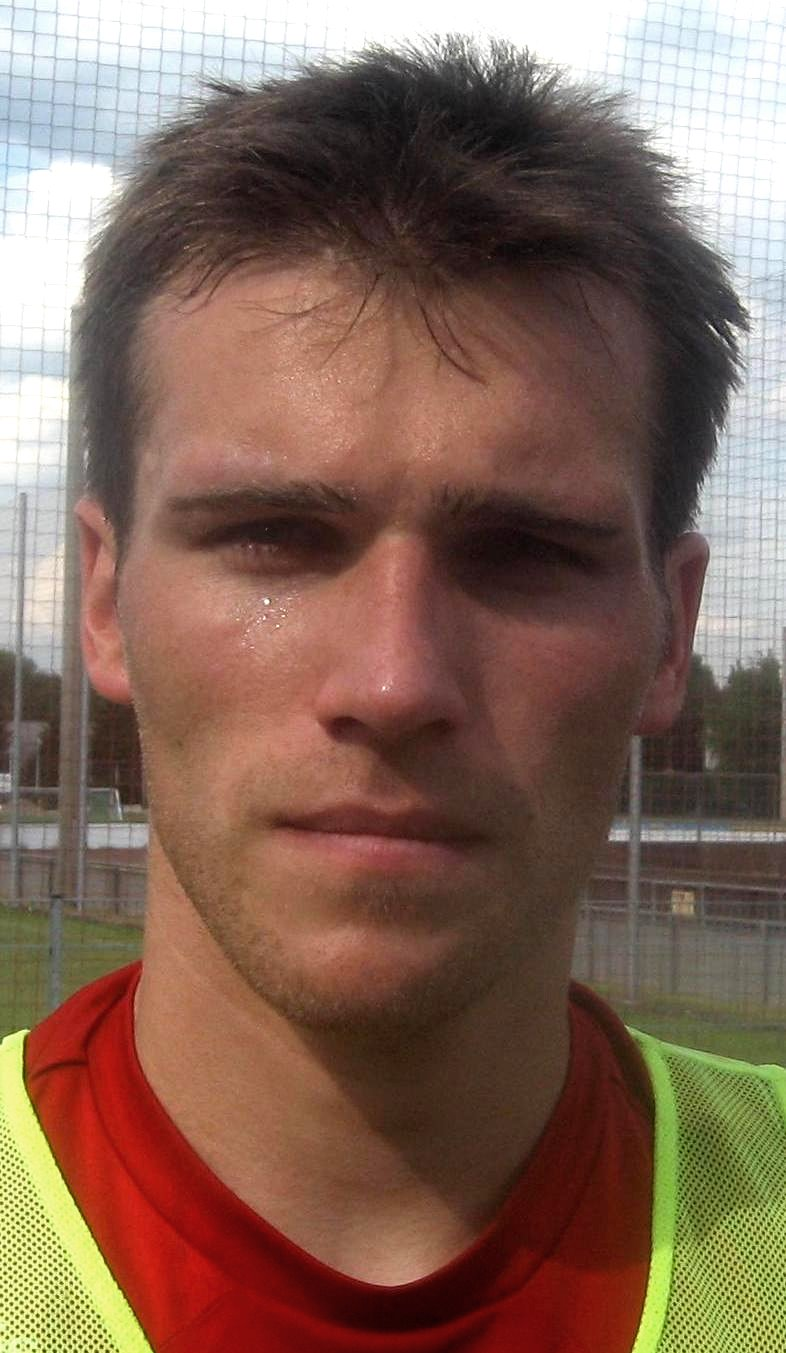
- Eigler in 2009

Personal information
- Date of birth: 1 January 1984 (age 42)
- Place of birth: Roth, West Germany
- Height: 1.85 m (6 ft 1 in)
- Position: Forward

Youth career
- –1993: SV Unterreichenbach
- 1993–1999: 1. FC Nürnberg
- 2000–2002: SV Unterreichenbach

Senior career*
Years	Team	Apps	(Gls)
2002–2006	Greuther Fürth	89	(27)
2006–2008	Arminia Bielefeld	56	(12)
2008–2012	1. FC Nürnberg	111	(20)
2012–2015	FC Ingolstadt 04	48	(8)
Total		304	(67)

International career
2006	Germany U21	1	(0)
- * Club domestic league appearances and goals

Christian Eigler (born 1 January 1984) is a German former professional footballer who played as a forward.

== Career ==
Eigler was born in Roth. He started his professional career at Greuther Fürth. He finished the 2005–06 2. Bundesliga season with 18 goals, which made him top scorer of the league and took part in the 2006 UEFA European Under-21 Football Championship with the German squad.

He moved to Greuther Fürth's rivals 1. FC Nürnberg in 2008, when Thomas von Heesen was coach there. He had previously played in another squad for which von Heesen has had responsibility for some time, Arminia Bielefeld. His professional playing career ended in 2015 after his three-year stay at FC Ingolstadt 04.
