= Mehmet Ekici =

Turkish footballer

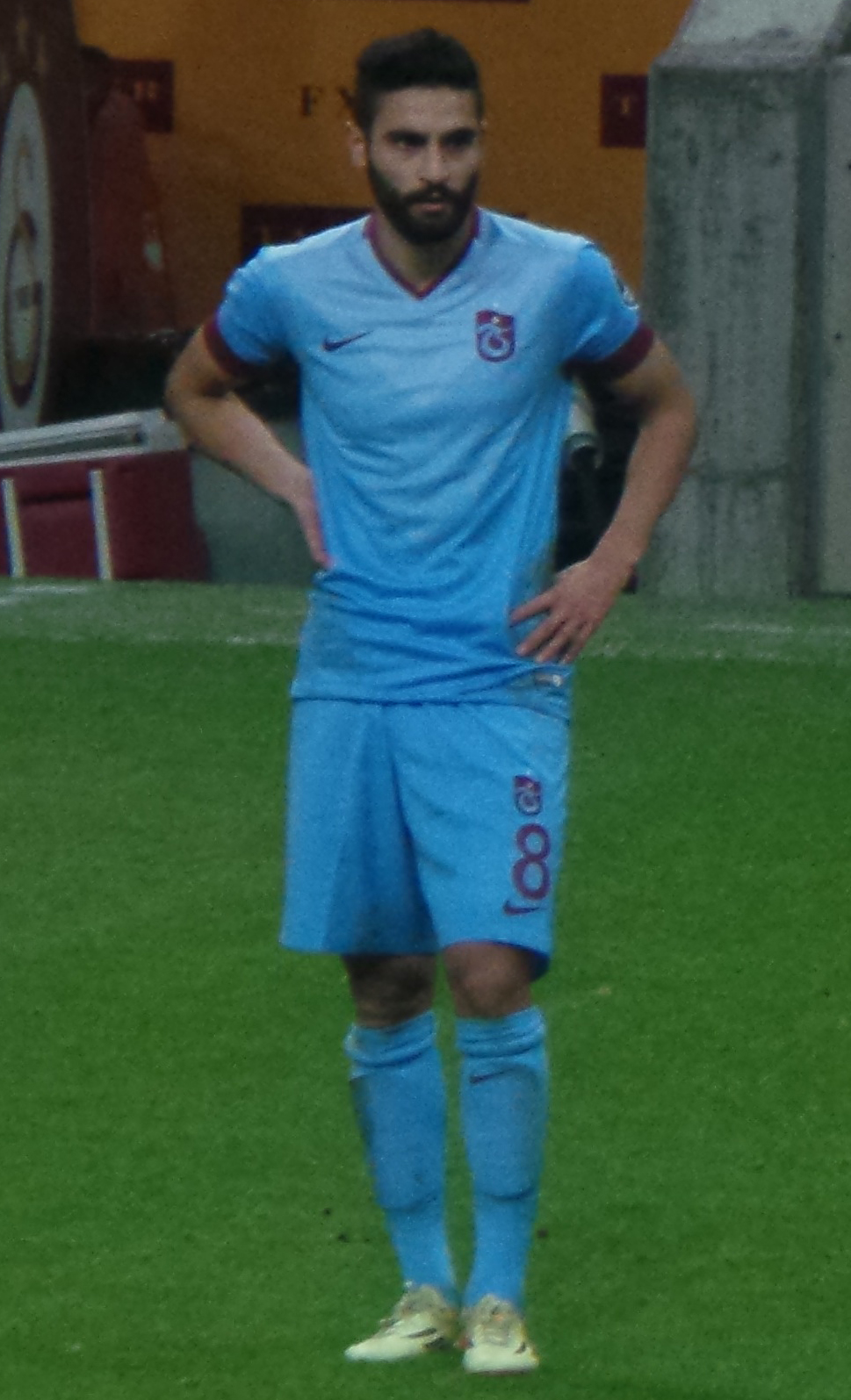
- Ekici in 2014

Personal information
- Date of birth: 25 March 1990 (age 36)
- Place of birth: Munich, West Germany
- Height: 1.80 m (5 ft 11 in)
- Position: Central midfielder

Youth career
- 1995–1997: SpVgg Unterhaching
- 1997–2009: Bayern Munich

Senior career*
Years	Team	Apps	(Gls)
2008–2010	Bayern Munich II	70	(18)
2010–2011	Bayern Munich	0	(0)
2010–2011	→ 1. FC Nürnberg (loan)	32	(3)
2011–2014	Werder Bremen	41	(4)
2014–2017	Trabzonspor	62	(16)
2017–2020	Fenerbahçe	38	(3)

International career^{‡}
2007	Germany U17	3	(0)
2007	Germany U18	1	(2)
2008	Germany U19	1	(0)
2009	Germany U20	4	(1)
2010	Germany U21	3	(0)
2010–2015	Turkey	12	(0)
Medal record
Bayern Munich
Winner	Bundesliga	2010
Winner	DFB-Pokal	2010
Runner-up	UEFA Champions League	2010
Germany U-17
Third place	FIFA Under-17 World Cup	2007
- * Club domestic league appearances and goals as of 14 March 2020 ‡ National team caps and goals as of 8 June 2018

Mehmet Ekici (Turkish pronunciation: [mehˈmet eˈcidʒi]; born 25 March 1990) is a professional footballer who most recently played as a central midfielder for Fenerbahçe.

He previously played for Werder Bremen, 1. FC Nürnberg, Bayern Munich, and Trabzonspor. Born in Germany, Ekici played for Germany for Under-17 to Under-21 level before switching to represent Turkey in senior competition.

== Club career ==
=== Bayern Munich ===
Ekici made his debut for Bayern Munich's first team in the 2008 T-Home Super Cup. He was named in Bayern Munich's squad for both the 2008–09 and 2009–10 UEFA Champions League. In January 2010, it was announced that Ekici would train with the first-team for the rest of the 2009–10 season, along with reserve teammates David Alaba and Diego Contento, and on 1 February, he followed Contento in signing a contract with the senior team. He scored 12 goals in 29 matches for the reserve team during the 2009–10 season. He was an unused substitute for a few first-team matches before injury ruled him out at the end of the season.

==== Nürnberg (loan) ====
In July 2010, he joined 1. FC Nürnberg on a season-long loan.

=== Werder Bremen ===
On 18 May 2011, Ekici transferred to Werder Bremen for a reported fee of around €5 million. He scored his first goal for Bremen on 17 September, against his former club 1. FC Nürnberg in a match that ended in a 1–1 draw. On 1 September 2013, he scored two goals leading his team to a 4–1 win over VfB Stuttgart.

=== Trabzonspor ===
Ekici joined Trabzonspor on 15 August 2014 for a fee of €1.5 million. He made his league debut on 31 August 2014 against Kayseri Erciyesspor, which ended in a 0–0 draw.

He left the club at the end of the 2016–17 season when his contract ran out. In his time at Trabzonspor, he made 83 appearances scoring 16 goals in all competitions.

=== Fenerbahçe ===
On 5 June 2017, Fenerbahçe announced the signing of Ekici.

== International career ==
Although he has represented Germany, the nation of his birth, at youth and U21 levels, he has elected to play for Turkey at the senior level. He was called up to the Turkish side by Guus Hiddink for the friendly match against the Netherlands. On 29 March 2011, Ekici represented Turkey in his first major international match against Austria where he played right-wing with Turkish play-maker Arda Turan on the left-wing, which resulted in Turkey winning the match 2–0 and getting their UEFA Euro 2012 qualification back on-track. Ekici went with Dutch manager Guus Hiddink to 1. FC Nürnberg to try to persuade his close friend İlkay Gündoğan to follow in his paths in playing for Turkey.

== Career statistics ==
=== Club ===
As of 14 March 2020.

Appearances and goals by club, season and competition
Club	Season	League			Cup		Continental		Total	
Club	Season	Division	Apps	Goals	Apps	Goals	Apps	Goals	Apps	Goals
Bayern Munich II	2007–08	Regionalliga Süd	9	0	—		—		9	0
Bayern Munich II	2008–09	3. Liga	32	6	—		—		32	6
Bayern Munich II	2009–10	3. Liga	29	12	—		—		29	12
Bayern Munich II	Total		70	18	—		—		70	18
1. FC Nürnberg (loan)	2010–11	Bundesliga	32	3	4	1	—		36	4
Werder Bremen	2011–12	Bundesliga	21	1	1	0	—		22	1
Werder Bremen	2012–13	Bundesliga	9	2	0	0	—		9	2
Werder Bremen	2013–14	Bundesliga	11	1	1	0	—		12	1
Werder Bremen	Total		41	4	2	0	—		43	4
Trabzonspor	2014–15	Süper Lig	29	9	6	0	7	1	42	10
Trabzonspor	2015–16	Süper Lig	18	4	2	0	2	1	22	5
Trabzonspor	2016–17	Süper Lig	15	3	4	0	—		19	3
Trabzonspor	Total		62	16	12	0	9	2	83	18
Fenerbahçe	2017–18	Süper Lig	9	0	2	0	0	0	11	0
Fenerbahçe	2018–19	Süper Lig	21	3	3	2	1	0	25	5
Fenerbahçe	2019–20	Süper Lig	5	0	4	0	0	0	9	0
Fenerbahçe	Total		35	3	9	2	1	0	45	5
Career total			239	44	27	3	10	2	277	49

== Honours ==
Bayern Munich

- Bundesliga: 2009–10
- DFB-Pokal: 2009–10

Individual

- Süper Lig Team of the Season: 2014–15
