= 2011 DFL-Supercup =

- Match programme cover
Schalke 04	Borussia Dortmund
0	0
- Schalke 04 won 4–3 on penalties
- Date: 23 July 2011
- Venue: Veltins-Arena, Gelsenkirchen
- Referee: Knut Kircher (Rottenburg)
- Attendance: 61,673

The 2011 DFL-Supercup was the second DFL-Supercup, an annual football match contested by the winners of the previous season's Bundesliga and DFB-Pokal competitions. It was a Revierderby between 2010–11 Bundesliga winners Borussia Dortmund, and 2010–11 DFB-Pokal winners Schalke 04. The match was played at Gelsenkirchen on 23 July 2011.

Schalke 04 prevailed on penalties, following a scoreless match after 90 minutes. There was no extra time played.

== Teams ==
In the following table, matches until 1996 were in the DFB-Supercup era, since 2010 were in the DFL-Supercup era.

Team	Qualification	Previous appearances (bold indicates winners)
Schalke 04	2010–11 DFB-Pokal winners	1 (2010) (Note: One-time winners and three-time runners-up in the DFL-Ligapokal.)
Borussia Dortmund	2010–11 Bundesliga champions	3 (**1989**, **1995**, **1996**) (Note: Winners of the unofficial 2008 German Supercup. One-time runners-up in the DFL-Ligapokal.)

== Match ==
=== Details ===
23 July 2011
20:30 CEST

Schalke 04	0–0	Borussia Dortmund
	Report
Penalties
Holtby (penalty scored); Edu (penalty scored); Höwedes (penalty scored); Jurado (penalty scored)	4–3	(penalty scored) Gündoğan; (penalty scored) Hummels; (penalty missed) Großkreutz; (penalty scored) Leitner; (penalty missed) Perišić

Veltins-Arena, Gelsenkirchen
Attendance: 61,673
Referee: Knut Kircher (Rottenburg)

**Schalke 04**	**Borussia Dortmund**

GK	1	(Germany) Ralf Fährmann
RB	12	(Germany) Marco Höger
CB	4	(Germany) Benedikt Höwedes (c)
CB	14	(Greece) Kyriakos Papadopoulos
LB	23	(Austria) Christian Fuchs
RW	11	(Germany) Alexander Baumjohann	(yellow card) 85'	(substituted off) 89'
CM	32	(Cameroon) Joël Matip
CM	10	(Germany) Lewis Holtby
LW	31	(Germany) Julian Draxler		(substituted off) 46'
SS	7	(Spain) Raúl
CF	25	(Netherlands) Klaas-Jan Huntelaar		(substituted off) 69'
Substitutions:
GK	36	(Germany) Lars Unnerstall
DF	22	(Japan) Atsuto Uchida
MF	16	(Czech Republic) Jan Morávek		(substituted on) 69'
MF	18	(Spain) José Manuel Jurado		(substituted on) 46'
MF	24	(Germany) Peer Kluge
MF	40	(Ghana) Anthony Annan
FW	9	(Brazil) Edu		(substituted on) 89'
Manager:
(Germany) Ralf Rangnick

GK	1	(Germany) Roman Weidenfeller
RB	26	(Poland) Łukasz Piszczek
CB	27	(Brazil) Felipe Santana
CB	15	(Germany) Mats Hummels
LB	24	(Germany) Chris Löwe		(substituted off) 77'
DM	5	(Germany) Sebastian Kehl (c)		(substituted off) 75'
DM	21	(Germany) İlkay Gündoğan
RW	11	(Germany) Mario Götze		(substituted off) 75'
AM	23	(Japan) Shinji Kagawa
LW	19	(Germany) Kevin Großkreutz	(yellow card) 66'
CF	9	(Poland) Robert Lewandowski
Substitutions:
GK	20	(Australia) Mitchell Langerak
DF	28	(Germany) Marc Hornschuh
MF	7	(Germany) Moritz Leitner		(substituted on) 77'
MF	14	(Croatia) Ivan Perišić		(substituted on) 75'
MF	22	(Germany) Sven Bender		(substituted on) 75'
FW	10	(Egypt) Mohamed Zidan
FW	13	(France) Damien Le Tallec
Manager:
(Germany) Jürgen Klopp

== See also ==
- 2011–12 Bundesliga
- 2011–12 DFB-Pokal
