= 2011–12 Borussia Dortmund season =

2011–12 season of Borussia Dortmund

Borussia Dortmund
2011–12 season
- President: Reinhard Rauball
- Head coach: Jürgen Klopp
- Bundesliga: 1st
- DFL-Supercup: Runners-up
- DFB-Pokal: Winners
- UEFA Champions League: Group stage
- Top goalscorer: League: Robert Lewandowski (22); All: Robert Lewandowski (30)
Home colours	Away colours	Third colours

The 2011–12 Borussia Dortmund season began on 23 July 2011 with a Revierderby loss against Schalke 04 in the DFL-Supercup. It ended with Dortmund completing the league and cup double with Bayern Munich as runners-up.

== Transfers ==
=== Summer 2011 ===
In:

No.	Pos.	Nation	Player
2	DF	GER	Julian Koch (loan return from MSV Duisburg)
7	MF	GER	Moritz Leitner (loan return from FC Augsburg)
14	MF	CRO	Ivan Perišić (from Club Brugge)
21	MF	GER	İlkay Gündoğan (from 1. FC Nürnberg)
24	DF	GER	Chris Löwe (from Chemnitzer FC)
31	MF	GER	Marvin Bakalorz (from Borussia Dortmund II)
36	MF	GER	Mario Vrančić (from Borussia Dortmund II)
-	MF	AUS	Mustafa Amini (from Central Coast Mariners)

Out:

No.	Pos.	Nation	Player
2	DF	GER	Lasse Sobiech (on loan to FC St. Pauli)
8	MF	TUR	Nuri Şahin (to Real Madrid)
11	FW	BUL	Dimitar Rangelov (on loan to Energie Cottbus)
14	MF	GER	Markus Feulner (to 1. FC Nürnberg)
17	DF	BRA	Dedê (to Eskişehirspor)
28	FW	GER	Daniel Ginczek (on loan to VfL Bochum)
39	FW	GER	Marco Stiepermann (on loan to Alemannia Aachen)
—	MF	AUS	Mustafa Amini (on loan to Central Coast Mariners)

=== Winter 2011–12 ===
In:

No.	Pos.	Nation	Player

Out:

No.	Pos.	Nation	Player
10	FW	EGY	Mohamed Zidan (to Mainz 05)
13	FW	FRA	Damien Le Tallec (to Nantes)
28	DF	GER	Marc Hornschuh (on loan to FC Ingolstadt)

== Statistics ==
=== Goals and appearances ===
No.	Pos	Nat	Player	Total		Bundesliga		UEFA Champions League		DFB-Pokal		DFL-Supercup	
No.	Pos	Nat	Player	Apps	Goals	Apps	Goals	Apps	Goals	Apps	Goals	Apps	Goals
1	GK	(Germany) GER	Roman Weidenfeller (vice-captain)	42	0	32	0	6	0	3	0	1	0
2	DF	(Germany) GER	Julian Koch	0	0	0	0	0	0	0	0	0	0
4	DF	(Serbia) SRB	Neven Subotić	33	0	25	0	4	0	4	0	0	0
5	MF	(Germany) GER	Sebastian Kehl (captain)	38	3	27	3	5	0	5	0	1	0
6	MF	(Germany) GER	Florian Kringe	2	0	1	0	0	0	1	0	0	0
7	MF	(Germany) GER	Moritz Leitner	23	0	17	0	3	0	2	0	1	0
8	MF	(Brazil) BRA	Antônio da Silva	8	0	5	0	2	0	1	0	0	0
9	FW	(Poland) POL	Robert Lewandowski	46	30	34	22	6	1	5	7	1	0
11	MF	(Germany) GER	Mario Götze	26	7	17	6	6	0	2	1	1	0
14	MF	(Croatia) CRO	Ivan Perišić	40	9	28	7	6	1	5	1	1	0
15	DF	(Germany) GER	Mats Hummels	45	2	33	1	6	1	5	0	1	0
16	MF	(Poland) POL	Jakub Błaszczykowski	39	7	29	6	5	1	5	0	0	0
18	FW	(Paraguay) PAR	Lucas Barrios	25	5	18	4	3	0	4	1	0	0
19	MF	(Germany) GER	Kevin Großkreutz	42	8	31	7	5	1	5	0	1	0
20	GK	(Australia) AUS	Mitchell Langerak	4	0	2	0	0	0	2	0	0	0
21	MF	(Germany) GER	İlkay Gündoğan	35	4	28	3	2	0	4	1	1	0
22	MF	(Germany) GER	Sven Bender	31	1	24	1	4	0	2	0	1	0
23	MF	(Japan) JPN	Shinji Kagawa	42	16	31	13	6	1	4	2	1	0
24	DF	(Germany) GER	Chris Löwe	11	0	7	0	1	0	2	0	1	0
25	DF	(Germany) GER	Patrick Owomoyela	12	1	11	1	0	0	1	0	0	0
26	DF	(Poland) POL	Łukasz Piszczek	44	4	32	4	6	0	5	0	1	0
27	DF	(Brazil) BRA	Felipe Santana	17	1	13	1	3	0	0	0	1	0
29	DF	(Germany) GER	Marcel Schmelzer	36	1	28	1	5	0	3	0	0	0
31	MF	(Germany) GER	Marvin Bakalorz	0	0	0	0	0	0	0	0	0	0
36	MF	(Germany) GER	Mario Vrančić	0	0	0	0	0	0	0	0	0	0
41	GK	(Germany) GER	Johannes Focher	0	0	0	0	0	0	0	0	0	0
Players sold or loaned out after the start of the season:
10	FW	(Egypt) EGY	Mohamed Zidan	3	0	2	0	1	0	0	0	0	0
13	FW	(France) FRA	Damien Le Tallec	0	0	0	0	0	0	0	0	0	0
28	DF	(Germany) GER	Marc Hornschuh	0	0	0	0	0	0	0	0	0	0

== Competitions ==
Win Draw Loss

=== DFL-Supercup ===
23 July 2011	Schalke 04	0–0 (a.e.t.) (4–3 p)	Borussia Dortmund	Gelsenkirchen
20:00 CEST (UTC+02:00)		Report		Stadium: Veltins-Arena; Attendance: 61,673

=== Bundesliga ===
==== League table ====
Pos	Team	Pld	W	D	L	GF	GA	GD	Pts	Qualification or relegation
1	Borussia Dortmund (C)	34	25	6	3	80	25	+55	81	Qualification to Champions League group stage
2	Bayern Munich	34	23	4	7	77	22	+55	73	Qualification to Champions League group stage
3	Schalke 04	34	20	4	10	74	44	+30	64	Qualification to Champions League group stage
4	Borussia Mönchengladbach	34	17	9	8	49	24	+25	60	Qualification to Champions League play-off round
5	Bayer Leverkusen	34	15	9	10	52	44	+8	54	Qualification to Europa League group stage (Note: The 2011–12 DFB-Pokal champions (Borussia Dortmund) and runners-up (Bayern Munich) qualified for the 2012–13 UEFA Champions League, thus the three Europa League places were distributed through league positions.)

Source: kicker
Rules for classification: 1) points; 2) goal difference; 3) number of goals scored.
(C) Champions

==== Results summary ====
Overall								Home						Away					
Pld	W	D	L	GF	GA	GD	Pts	W	D	L	GF	GA	GD	W	D	L	GF	GA	GD
34	25	6	3	80	25	+55	81	14	2	1	44	12	+32	11	4	2	36	13	+23

Last updated: 5 May 2012.
Source: Competitive matches

==== Results by matchday ====
Matchday	1	2	3	4	5	6	7	8	9	10	11	12	13	14	15	16	17	18	19	20	21	22	23	24	25	26	27	28	29	30	31	32	33	34
Ground	H	A	H	A	H	A	A	H	A	H	A	H	H	A	A	H	H	A	H	A	A	H	A	H	A	H	A	H	A	A	H	H	H	A
Result	W	L	W	D	L	L	W	W	W	W	D	W	W	W	D	D	W	W	W	W	W	W	W	W	D	W	W	D	W	W	W	W	W	W
Position	3	7	6	6	11	11	8	6	3	2	3	2	2	1	2	2	2	2	2	1	1	1	1	1	1	1	1	1	1	1	1	1	1	1
Points	3	3	6	7	7	7	10	13	16	19	20	23	26	29	30	31	34	37	40	43	46	49	52	55	56	59	62	63	66	69	72	75	78	81

Source: Premier League
A = Away; H = Home; W = Win; D = Draw; L = Loss
Notes: Positions show the situation at the end of the corresponding Game Weeks (GW), not the position at the conclusion of matches or game days.

==== Matches ====
5 August 2011 1	Borussia Dortmund	3–1	Hamburger SV	Dortmund
20:40	Großkreutz 17', 48'; Götze 29'	Report	Tesche 79'	Stadium: Signal Iduna Park; Attendance: 80,720; Referee: Felix Brych

13 August 2011 2	1899 Hoffenheim	1–0	Borussia Dortmund	Sinsheim
15:30	Salihović 9'	Report		Stadium: Rhein-Neckar Arena; Attendance: 30,150; Referee: Deniz Aytekin

20 August 2011 3	Borussia Dortmund	2–0	1. FC Nürnberg	Dortmund
15:30	Lewandowski 50'; Großkreutz 80'	Report		Stadium: Signal Iduna Park; Attendance: 78,400; Referee: Felix Zwayer

27 August 2011 4	Bayer Leverkusen	0–0	Borussia Dortmund	Leverkusen
18:30		Report		Stadium: BayArena; Attendance: 30,210; Referee: Wolfgang Stark

10 September 2011 5	Borussia Dortmund	1–2	Hertha BSC	Dortmund
15:30	Lewandowski 88'	Report	Raffael 49'; Niemeyer 80'	Stadium: Signal Iduna Park; Attendance: 80,720; Referee: Marco Fritz

18 September 2011 6	Hannover 96	2–1	Borussia Dortmund	Hanover
15:30	Haggui 87'; Ya Konan 89'	Report	Kagawa 63'	Stadium: AWD-Arena; Attendance: 49,000; Referee: Peter Gagelmann

24 September 2011 7	Mainz 05	1–2	Borussia Dortmund	Mainz
15:30	Müller 33'	Report	Perišić 64'; Piszczek 90'	Stadium: Coface Arena; Attendance: 34,000; Referee: Michael Weiner

1 October 2011 8	Borussia Dortmund	4–0	FC Augsburg	Dortmund
15:30	Lewandowski 30', 44', 78'; Götze 75'	Report		Stadium: Signal Iduna Park; Attendance: 80,720; Referee: Babak Rafati

14 October 2011 9	Werder Bremen	0–2	Borussia Dortmund	Bremen
20:30		Report	Perišić 42'; Owomoyela 72'	Stadium: Weserstadion; Attendance: 42,000; Referee: Florian Meyer

22 October 2011 10	Borussia Dortmund	5–0	1. FC Köln	Dortmund
15:30	Kagawa 7'; Schmelzer 25'; Lewandowski 44', 50'; Kehl 66'	Report		Stadium: Signal Iduna Park; Attendance: 80,200; Referee: Felix Brych

29 October 2011 11	VfB Stuttgart	1–1	Borussia Dortmund	Stuttgart
15:45	Tasci 22'	Report	Piszczek 45+1'	Stadium: Mercedes-Benz Arena; Attendance: 60,000; Referee: Manuel Gräfe

5 November 2011 12	Borussia Dortmund	5–1	VfL Wolfsburg	Dortmund
15:30	Götze 12', 78'; Kagawa 45'; Bender 61'; Lewandowski 66'	Report	Hleb 59'	Stadium: Signal Iduna Park; Attendance: 80,720; Referee: Dr. Jochen Drees

19 November 2011 13	Bayern Munich	0–1	Borussia Dortmund	Munich
18:30		Report	Götze 65'	Stadium: Allianz Arena; Attendance: 69,000; Referee: Peter Gagelmann

26 November 2011 14	Borussia Dortmund	2–0	Schalke 04	Dortmund
15:30	Lewandowski 16'; Santana 61'	Report		Stadium: Signal Iduna Park; Attendance: 80,720; Referee: Florian Meyer

3 December 2011 15	Borussia Mönchengladbach	1–1	Borussia Dortmund	Mönchengladbach
15:30	Hanke 72'	Report	Lewandowski 40'	Stadium: Borussia-Park; Attendance: 54,047; Referee: Felix Zwayer

11 December 2011 16	Borussia Dortmund	1–1	1. FC Kaiserslautern	Dortmund
15:30	Kagawa 27'	Report	Şahan 60'	Stadium: Signal Iduna Park; Attendance: 80,720; Referee: Deniz Aytekin

17 December 2011 17	SC Freiburg	1–4	Borussia Dortmund	Freiburg
15:30	Rosenthal 34'	Report	Lewandowski 7', 70'; Gündoğan 44'; Großkreutz 59'	Stadium: Mage Solar Stadion; Attendance: 24,000; Referee: Günter Perl

22 January 2012 18	Hamburger SV	1–5	Borussia Dortmund	Hamburg
15:30	Guerrero 86'	Report	Großkreutz 16'; Lewandowski 37', 83'; Błaszczykowski 58', 76' (pen.)	Stadium: Imtech Arena; Attendance: 57,000; Referee: Wolfgang Stark

28 January 2012 19	Borussia Dortmund	3–1	1899 Hoffenheim	Dortmund
15:30	Kagawa 16', 55'; Großkreutz 31'	Report	Johnson 63'	Stadium: Signal Iduna Park; Attendance: 80,500; Referee: Knut Kircher

3 February 2012 20	1. FC Nürnberg	0–2	Borussia Dortmund	Nuremberg
20:30		Report	Kehl 48'; Barrios 82'	Stadium: Frankenstadion; Attendance: 46,000; Referee: Florian Meyer

11 February 2012 21	Borussia Dortmund	1–0	Bayer Leverkusen	Dortmund
15:30	Kagawa 45'	Report		Stadium: Signal Iduna Park; Attendance: 80,000; Referee: Günter Perl

18 February 2012 22	Hertha BSC	0–1	Borussia Dortmund	Berlin
15:30		Report	Großkreutz 45'	Stadium: Olympiastadion; Attendance: 74,244; Referee: Marco Fritz

26 February 2012 23	Borussia Dortmund	3–1	Hannover 96	Dortmund
17:30	Lewandowski 26', 54'; Perišić 90+2'	Report	Ya Konan 60'	Stadium: Signal Iduna Park; Attendance: 80,720; Referee: Manuel Gräfe

3 March 2012 24	Borussia Dortmund	2–1	Mainz 05	Dortmund
18:30	Błaszczykowski 26'; Kagawa 77'	Report	Zidan 74'	Stadium: Signal Iduna Park; Attendance: 80,720; Referee: Peter Gagelmann

10 March 2012 25	FC Augsburg	0–0	Borussia Dortmund	Augsburg
18:30		Report		Stadium: SGL arena Attendance: 30,660; Referee: Knut Kircher

17 March 2012 26	Borussia Dortmund	1–0	Werder Bremen	Dortmund
15:30	Kagawa 8'	Report		Stadium: Signal Iduna Park; Attendance: 80,720; Referee: Deniz Aytekin

25 March 2012 27	1. FC Köln	1–6	Borussia Dortmund	Cologne
17:30	Novaković 13'	Report	Piszczek 26'; Kagawa 47', 80'; Lewandowski 52'; Gündoğan 79'; Perišić 84'	Stadium: RheinEnergieStadion; Attendance: 50,000; Referee: Felix Zwayer

30 March 2012 28	Borussia Dortmund	4–4	VfB Stuttgart	Dortmund
20:30	Kagawa 33'; Błaszczykowski 49'; Hummels 82'; Perišić 87'		Ibišević 71'; Schieber 77', 79'; Gentner 90+2'	Stadium: Signal Iduna Park; Attendance: 80,720; Referee: Michael Weiner

7 April 2012 29	VfL Wolfsburg	1–3	Borussia Dortmund	Wolfsburg
17:30	Mandžukić 61'		Lewandowski 22', 90'; Gündoğan 49'	Stadium: Volkswagen Arena; Attendance: 30,000; Referee: Christian Dingert

11 April 2012 30	Borussia Dortmund	1–0	Bayern Munich	Dortmund
20:00	Lewandowski 77'			Stadium: Signal Iduna Park; Attendance: 80,720; Referee: Knut Kircher

14 April 2012 31	Schalke 04	1–2	Borussia Dortmund	Gelsenkirchen
15:30	Farfán 9'	Report	Piszczek 17'; Kehl 63'	Stadium: Veltins-Arena; Attendance: 61,673; Referee: Manuel Gräfe

21 April 2012 32	Borussia Dortmund	2–0	Borussia Mönchengladbach	Dortmund
18:30	Perišić 23'; Kagawa 59'			Stadium: Signal Iduna Park; Attendance: 80,720; Referee: Florian Meyer

28 April 2012 33	1. FC Kaiserslautern	2–5	Borussia Dortmund	Kaiserslautern
15:30	Santana 16' (o.g.); De Wit 49'		Barrios 18', 26', 55'; Götze 33'; Perišić 76'	Stadium: Fritz-Walter-Stadion; Attendance: 49,780; Referee: Markus Schmidt

5 May 2012 34	Borussia Dortmund	4–0	SC Freiburg	Dortmund
15:30	Błaszczykowski 5', 39'; Lewandowski 20', 27'			Stadium: Signal Iduna Park; Attendance: 80,720; Referee: Peter Sippel

=== DFB-Pokal ===
30 July 2011 Round 1	SV Sandhausen	0–3	Borussia Dortmund	Sandhausen
19:30 CEST (UTC+02:00)		Report	Lewandowski 10', 90'; Kagawa 56'	Stadium: Hardtwaldstadion; Attendance: 10,231; Referee: Tobias Christ

25 October 2011 Round 2	Borussia Dortmund	2–0	Dynamo Dresden	Dortmund
20:45 CEST (UTC+02:00)	Lewandowski 30'; Götze 65'	Report		Stadium: Signal Iduna Park; Attendance: 73,100; Referee: Peter Gagelmann

20 December 2011 Round 3	Fortuna Düsseldorf	0–0 (a.e.t.) (4–5 p)	Borussia Dortmund	Düsseldorf
20:30 CET (UTC+01:00)		Report	Owomoyela (yellow card) 34' (red card)	Stadium: Esprit Arena; Attendance: 54,000; Referee: Manuel Gräfe
	Penalties
	Jovanović (penalty scored); Langeneke (penalty scored); Lambertz (penalty scored); Bröker (penalty missed); Rösler (penalty scored)		(penalty scored) Hummels; (penalty scored) Błaszczykowski; (penalty scored) Kehl; (penalty scored) Gündoğan; (penalty scored) Perišić

7 February 2012 Quarter-finals	Holstein Kiel	0–4	Borussia Dortmund	Kiel
20:30 CET (UTC+01:00)		Report	Lewandowski 11'; Kagawa 18'; Barrios 80'; Perišić 87'	Stadium: Holstein-Stadion; Attendance: 11,386; Referee: Felix Zwayer

20 March 2012 Semi-finals	Greuther Fürth	0–1 (a.e.t.)	Borussia Dortmund	Fürth
20:30 CET (UTC+01:00)		Report	Gündoğan 120'	Stadium: Trolli Arena; Attendance: 15,500; Referee: Florian Meyer

12 May 2012 Final	Borussia Dortmund	5–2	Bayern Munich	Berlin
20:00 CEST (UTC+02:00)	Kagawa 3'; Hummels 41' (pen.); Lewandowski 45+1', 58', 81'		Robben 25' (pen.); Ribéry 75'	Stadium: Olympiastadion; Attendance: 75,708; Referee: Peter Gagelmann

=== UEFA Champions League ===
==== Group stage ====
Pos	Team	Pld	W	D	L	GF	GA	GD	Pts	Qualification
1	(England) Arsenal	6	3	2	1	7	6	+1	11	Advance to knockout phase
2	(France) Marseille	6	3	1	2	7	4	+3	10	Advance to knockout phase
3	(Greece) Olympiacos	6	3	0	3	8	6	+2	9	Transfer to Europa League
4	(Germany) Borussia Dortmund	6	1	1	4	6	12	−6	4	

Source: Soccerway

13 September 2011 1	Borussia Dortmund (Germany)	1–1	(England) Arsenal	Dortmund, Germany
20:45 CEST (UTC+02:00)	Schmelzer (yellow card) 76'; Perišić 88'; Bender (yellow card) 90+4'	Report	Van Persie 42'; Sagna (yellow card) 75'	Stadium: Signal Iduna Park; Attendance: 65,590; Referee: Gianluca Rocchi (Italy)

28 September 2011 2	Marseille (France)	3–0	(Germany) Borussia Dortmund	Marseille, France
20:45 CEST (UTC+02:00)	A. Ayew 20', 69' (pen.); Morel (yellow card) 60'; Rémy 62'; J. Ayew (yellow card) 79' (yellow-red card) 90+3'	Report	Hummels (yellow card) 58'	Stadium: Stade Vélodrome; Attendance: 26,142; Referee: Jonas Eriksson (Sweden)

19 October 2011 3	Olympiacos (Greece)	3–1	(Germany) Borussia Dortmund	Piraeus, Greece
20:45 CEST (UTC+02:00)	Holebas 8'; Djebbour 40'; Modesto 78'	Report	Lewandowski 26'; Schmelzer (yellow card) 58'	Stadium: Karaiskakis Stadium; Attendance: 33,334; Referee: Bas Nijhuis (Netherlands)

1 November 2011 4	Borussia Dortmund (Germany)	1–0	(Greece) Olympiacos	Dortmund, Germany
20:45 CET (UTC+01:00)	Großkreutz 7'; Perišić (yellow card) 73'	Report	Mellberg (yellow card) 52'; Papadopoulos (yellow card) 59'; Orbaiz (yellow card) 74'	Stadium: Signal Iduna Park; Attendance: 65,590; Referee: Vladislav Bezborodov (Russia)

23 November 2011 5	Arsenal (England)	2–1	(Germany) Borussia Dortmund	London, England
20:45 CET (UTC+01:00)	Van Persie 49', 86'; Walcott (yellow card) 63'; Ramsey (yellow card) 76'; Benayoun (yellow card) 78'	Report	Schmelzer (yellow card) 53'; Kagawa 90+2'	Stadium: Emirates Stadium; Attendance: 59,531; Referee: Frank De Bleeckere (Belgium)

6 December 2011 6	Borussia Dortmund (Germany)	2–3	(France) Marseille	Dortmund, Germany
20:45 CET (UTC+01:00)	Błaszczykowski 23'; Hummels 32' (pen.); Santana (yellow card) 68'	Report	Mbia (yellow card) 29'; Amalfitano (yellow card) 44'; Rémy 45+4'; A. Ayew (yellow card) 73', (goal) 85'; Diarra (yellow card) 75'; Valbuena (yellow card) 82', (goal) 87'	Stadium: Signal Iduna Park; Attendance: 65,000; Referee: Howard Webb (England)

== See also ==
- 2011 DFL-Supercup
- 2011–12 Bundesliga
- 2011–12 UEFA Champions League
- 2011–12 DFB-Pokal
- Borussia Dortmund
