= 2009–10 Borussia Dortmund season =

2009–10 season of Borussia Dortmund

Borussia Dortmund
2009–10 season
- Manager: Jürgen Klopp
- Stadium: Westfalenstadion
- Bundesliga: 5th
- DFB-Pokal: Round of 16
- Top goalscorer: Lucas Barrios (19)
Home colours	Away colours	Third colours

During the 2009–10 German football season, Borussia Dortmund competed in the Bundesliga.

== Season summary ==
Dortmund finished in fifth, one place higher than in last season. This saw them qualify for the Europa League.

== First-team squad ==
Squad at end of season

Note: Flags indicate national team as defined under FIFA eligibility rules; some limited exceptions apply. Players may hold more than one non-FIFA nationality.

No.	Pos.	Nation	Player
1	GK	GER	Roman Weidenfeller
4	DF	SRB	Neven Subotić (Note: Subotić was born in Banja Luka, SFR Yugoslavia (now Bosnia and Herzegovina), but was raised in Germany from the age of five and then the United States from the age of 10, and also qualified to represent Serbia internationally through his parents. He represented the United States at U-17 and U-20 level before making his international debut for Serbia in March 2009.)
5	MF	GER	Sebastian Kehl (captain)
7	MF	BRA	Tinga
8	MF	TUR	Nuri Şahin (Note: Şahin was born in Lüdenscheid, Germany, but also qualified to represent Turkey internationally through his parents and represented them at U-16, U-17, U-19 and U-21 level before making his international debut for Turkey in 2005.)
9	FW	PAR	Nelson Valdez
10	FW	EGY	Mohamed Zidan
11	FW	BUL	Dimitar Rangelov
13	MF	FRA	Damien Le Tallec
14	MF	GER	Markus Feulner
15	DF	GER	Mats Hummels
16	MF	POL	Jakub Błaszczykowski
17	DF	BRA	Dedê
18	FW	PAR	Lucas Barrios (Note: Barrios was born in San Fernando, Argentina, but also qualified to represent Paraguay internationally after gaining citizenship and made his international debut for Paraguay in 2010.)
19	DF	GER	Kevin Großkreutz
20	GK	GER	Marc Ziegler
21	DF	GER	Uwe Hünemeier

No.	Pos.	Nation	Player
22	MF	GER	Sven Bender
23	FW	GER	Christopher Kullmann
25	DF	GER	Patrick Owomoyela
26	FW	GER	Daniel Ginczek
27	DF	BRA	Felipe Santana
28	MF	POL	Sebastian Tyrała (Note: Tyrała was born in Racibórz, Poland, but also qualified to represent Germany internationally and represented them at U-19 level before making his international debut for Poland in December 2008.)
29	DF	GER	Marcel Schmelzer
30	MF	HUN	Tamás Hajnal
31	MF	GER	Mario Götze
33	DF	GER	David Vržogić
34	FW	GER	Bajram Sadrijaj
36	MF	GER	Yasin Öztekin (Note: Öztekin was born in Dortmund, Germany, but also qualified to represent Turkey internationally and would make his international debut for Turkey in June 2015.)
39	MF	GER	Marco Stiepermann
40	GK	GER	Marcel Höttecke
41	GK	GER	Johannes Focher
44	DF	GER	Marc Hornschuh
45	MF	GER	Julian Koch

=== Left club during season ===
Note: Flags indicate national team as defined under FIFA eligibility rules; some limited exceptions apply. Players may hold more than one non-FIFA nationality.

No.	Pos.	Nation	Player
6	MF	GER	Florian Kringe (on loan to Hertha Berlin)

== Competitions ==
=== Bundesliga ===
==== League table ====
Pos	Team	Pld	W	D	L	GF	GA	GD	Pts	Qualification or relegation
3	Werder Bremen	34	17	10	7	71	40	+31	61	Qualification to Champions League play-off round
4	Bayer Leverkusen	34	15	14	5	65	38	+27	59	Qualification to Europa League play-off round
5	Borussia Dortmund	34	16	9	9	54	42	+12	57	Qualification to Europa League play-off round
6	VfB Stuttgart	34	15	10	9	51	41	+10	55	Qualification to Europa League third qualifying round (Note: Since both finalists of the 2009–10 DFB-Pokal were qualified for the 2010–11 UEFA Champions League, the 6th-placed team will qualify for the 3rd qualifying round of the 2010–11 UEFA Europa League.)
7	Hamburger SV	34	13	13	8	56	41	+15	52	

Source: kicker.de (in German)
Rules for classification: 1) points; 2) goal difference; 3) number of goals scored.

==== Results summary ====
Overall								Home						Away					
Pld	W	D	L	GF	GA	GD	Pts	W	D	L	GF	GA	GD	W	D	L	GF	GA	GD
34	16	9	9	54	42	+12	57	10	4	3	29	14	+15	6	5	6	25	28	−3

Source: Soccerway

==== Matches ====
8 August 2009 1	Borussia Dortmund	1–0	1. FC Köln	Dortmund
15:30 CEST (UTC+2)	Matip 75' (o.g.)	Report	Brečko (yellow card) 65'	Stadium: Signal Iduna Park; Referee: Wolfgang Stark; Assistant referees: Mike Pickel, Jan-Hendrik Salver; Fourth official: Bibiana Steinhaus

15 August 2009 2	Hamburger SV	4–1	Borussia Dortmund	Hamburg
15:30 CEST (UTC+2)	Demel 3'; Zé Roberto 10'; Guerrero 12'; Berg 72'	Report	Valdez 4'; Hajnal (yellow card) 31'	Stadium: HSH Nordbank Arena; Referee: Michael Kempter; Assistant referees: Mark Borsch, Tobias Welz; Fourth official: Carsten Kadach

22 August 2009 3	Borussia Dortmund	1–1	VfB Stuttgart	Dortmund
15:30 CEST (UTC+2)	Barrios (yellow card) 17'; Valdez 27', (yellow card) 81'	Report	Niedermeier 47'; Hitzlsperger (yellow card) 66'; Gebhart (yellow card) 82'	Stadium: Signal Iduna Park; Referee: Helmut Fleischer; Assistant referees: Sönke Glindemann, Guido Kleve; Fourth official: Thorsten Schriever

29 August 2009 4	Eintracht Frankfurt	1–1	Borussia Dortmund	Frankfurt
15:30 CEST (UTC+2)	Franz (yellow card) 54'; Amanatidis 68'	Report	Hummels (yellow card) 47'; Şahin (yellow card) 60'; Zidan 61'; Hajnal (yellow card) 76'	Stadium: Commerzbank-Arena; Referee: Florian Meyer; Assistant referees: Holger Henschel, Carsten Kadach; Fourth official: Markus Wingenbach

12 September 2009 5	Borussia Dortmund	1–5	Bayern Munich	Dortmund
15:30 CEST (UTC+2)	Hummels 10'	Report	Gómez 36'; Schweinsteiger 49'; Ribéry 65'; Müller 78', 88'	Stadium: Signal Iduna Park; Referee: Knut Kircher; Assistant referees: Robert Kempter, Stefan Lupp; Fourth official: Marco Fritz

19 September 2009 6	Hannover 96	1–1	Borussia Dortmund	Hanover
15:30 CEST (UTC+2)	Ya Konan 48', (yellow card) 48'; Cherundolo (yellow card) 77'; Balitsch (yellow card) 88'	Report	Şahin 45'	Stadium: AWD-Arena; Referee: Günter Perl; Assistant referees: Josef Maier, Georg Schalk; Fourth official: Matthias Anklam

26 September 2009 7	Borussia Dortmund	0–1	Schalke 04	Dortmund
15:30 CEST (UTC+2)		Report	Farfán 31'; Moritz (yellow card) 85'	Stadium: Signal Iduna Park; Referee: Wolfgang Stark; Assistant referees: Mike Pickel, Jan-Hendrik Salver; Fourth official: Felix Zwayer

3 October 2009 8	Borussia Mönchengladbach	0–1	Borussia Dortmund	Mönchengladbach
18:30 CEST (UTC+2)	Levels (yellow card) 88'	Report	Barrios 38'; Hajnal (yellow card) 69'	Stadium: Borussia-Park; Referee: Manuel Gräfe; Assistant referees: Christian Dingert, Markus Hacker; Fourth official: Thomas Metzen

18 October 2009 9	Borussia Dortmund	2–0	VfL Bochum	Dortmund
17:30 CEST (UTC+2)	Barrios 20'; Valdez (yellow card) 30'; Subotić 51'; Şahin (yellow card) 72'	Report	Azaouagh (yellow card) 29'; Mavraj (yellow card) 50'; Dabrowski (yellow card) 53'; Epalle (yellow card) 54'	Stadium: Signal Iduna Park; Referee: Michael Weiner; Assistant referees: Thomas Frank, Norbert Grudzinski; Fourth official: Christoph Bornhorst

23 October 2009 10	Bayer Leverkusen	1–1	Borussia Dortmund	Leverkusen
20:30 CEST (UTC+2)	Barnetta (yellow card) 30'; Friedrich (yellow card) 63', (goal) 64'; Kroos (yellow card) 72'; Reinartz (yellow card) 90+2'	Report	Barrios 8', (yellow card) 57'; Owomoyela (yellow card) 36'	Stadium: BayArena; Referee: Babak Rafati; Assistant referees: Holger Henschel, Patrick Ittrich; Fourth official: Thorsten Schriever

30 October 2009 11	Borussia Dortmund	2–0	Hertha BSC	Dortmund
20:30 CET (UTC+1)	Şahin 60' (pen.); Rangelov (yellow card) 79'; Bender (yellow card) 85'; Barrios 90+1'	Report	Ebert (yellow card) 77'	Stadium: Signal Iduna Park; Referee: Felix Brych; Assistant referees: Marco Achmüller, Robert Hartmann; Fourth official: Guido Kleve

8 November 2009 12	Werder Bremen	1–1	Borussia Dortmund	Bremen
17:30 CET (UTC+1)	Özil 36'; Bargfrede (yellow card) 73'	Report	Barrios 54', (yellow card) 66'; Valdez (yellow card) 57'	Stadium: Weserstadion; Referee: Manuel Gräfe; Assistant referees: Christian Dingert, Markus Hacker; Fourth official: Kai Voss

21 November 2009 13	Borussia Dortmund	0–0	Mainz 05	Dortmund
18:30 CET (UTC+1)	Schmelzer (yellow card) 88'	Report		Stadium: Signal Iduna Park; Referee: Michael Weiner; Assistant referees: Thomas Frank, Norbert Grudzinski; Fourth official: Stefan Trautmann

28 November 2009 14	1899 Hoffenheim	1–2	Borussia Dortmund	Sinsheim
15:30 CET (UTC+1)	Compper (yellow card) 40'; Ba 49'; Šimunić (yellow card) 78'; Maicosuel (red card) 81'; Salihović (yellow card) 89'	Report	Błaszczykowski 2'; Subotić (yellow card) 30'; Schmelzer (yellow card) 54'; Şahin 79' (pen.); Bender (yellow card) 83'	Stadium: Rhein-Neckar-Arena; Referee: Michael Kempter; Assistant referees: Mark Borsch, Tobias Welz; Fourth official: Wolfgang Walz

5 December 2009 15	Borussia Dortmund	4–0	1. FC Nürnberg	Dortmund
15:30 CET (UTC+1)	Großkreutz 8', (yellow card) 11'; Barrios 13'; Zidan 36'; Hummels 62', (yellow card) 65'	Report	Pinola (yellow card) 45+1'; Wolf (yellow card) 46'; Judt (yellow card) 60'	Stadium: Signal Iduna Park; Referee: Peter Gagelmann; Assistant referees: Matthias Anklam, Sascha Thielert; Fourth official: Christian Schößling

13 December 2009 16	VfL Wolfsburg	1–3	Borussia Dortmund	Wolfsburg
17:30 CET (UTC+1)	Grafite 55'; Josué (yellow card) 71'	Report	Barrios 8', 10'; Owomoyela 36'; Şahin (yellow card) 43'; Großkreutz (yellow card) 89'	Stadium: Volkswagen Arena; Referee: Knut Kircher; Assistant referees: Stefan Lupp, Tobias Stieler; Fourth official: Tim Sönder

19 December 2009 17	Borussia Dortmund	1–0	SC Freiburg	Dortmund
15:30 CET (UTC+1)	Barrios 19'	Report	Banović (yellow card) 40'	Stadium: Signal Iduna Park; Referee: Peter Sippel; Assistant referees: Guido Kleve, Christian Leicher; Fourth official: Frederick Assmuth

17 January 2010 18	1. FC Köln	2–3	Borussia Dortmund	Cologne
17:30 CET (UTC+1)	Podolski (yellow card) 45+4'; Womé (yellow card) 50'; Maniche (yellow card) 69'; Mondragón (yellow card) 78'; McKenna 82'; Mohamad 88'	Report	Valdez (yellow card) 12'; Hummels 28', 45+5'; Großkreutz (yellow card) 62', (goal) 90+1'; Schmelzer (yellow card) 87'	Stadium: RheinEnergieStadion; Referee: Florian Meyer; Assistant referees: Carsten Kadach, Frank Willenborg; Fourth official: Stefan Trautmann

23 January 2010 19	Borussia Dortmund	1–0	Hamburger SV	Dortmund
18:30 CET (UTC+1)	Valdez 36'; Subotić (yellow card) 48'	Report	Mathijsen (yellow card) 35'; Boateng (yellow card) 57'; Rozehnal (yellow card) 90+2'	Stadium: Signal Iduna Park; Referee: Manuel Gräfe; Assistant referees: Christian Dingert, Markus Hacker; Fourth official: Mark Borsch

31 January 2010 20	VfB Stuttgart	4–1	Borussia Dortmund	Stuttgart
15:30 CET (UTC+1)	Santana 14' (o.g.); Marica (yellow card) 32', (penalty missed) 48', 86'; Pogrebnyak (yellow card) 50'; Kuzmanović 77'; Träsch 89'	Report	Şahin (yellow card) 33'; Barrios 55', (yellow card) 61'; Santana (yellow card) 65'; Schmelzer (yellow card) 76'	Stadium: Mercedes-Benz Arena; Referee: Peter Gagelmann; Assistant referees: Matthias Anklam, Daniel Siebert; Fourth official: Josef Maier

7 February 2010 21	Borussia Dortmund	2–3	Eintracht Frankfurt	Dortmund
17:30 CET (UTC+1)	Hummels 17'; Barrios 57'; Valdez (yellow card) 61'	Report	Köhler 8'; Spycher (yellow card) 42'; Jung 65'; Franz (yellow card) 66'; Meier 74'	Stadium: Signal Iduna Park; Referee: Wolfgang Stark; Assistant referees: Mike Pickel, Jan-Hendrik Salver; Fourth official: Christian Leicher

13 February 2010 22	Bayern Munich	3–1	Borussia Dortmund	Munich
18:30 CET (UTC+1)	Van Bommel 21'; Robben 50'; Gómez 65'	Report	Zidan 5'	Stadium: Allianz Arena; Referee: Knut Kircher; Assistant referees: Mark Borsch, Christian Dingert; Fourth official: Arno Blos

20 February 2010 23	Borussia Dortmund	4–1	Hannover 96	Dortmund
15:30 CET (UTC+1)	Barrios (yellow card) 37'; Hummels (yellow card) 39'; Subotić 43'; Eggimann 60' (o.g.); Valdez 77'; Großkreutz 88'	Report	Koné 81'	Stadium: Signal Iduna Park; Referee: Lutz Wagner; Assistant referees: Bastian Dankert, Daniel Siebert; Fourth official: Frederick Assmuth

26 February 2010 24	Schalke 04	2–1	Borussia Dortmund	Gelsenkirchen
20:30 CET (UTC+1)	Kurányi (yellow card) 54'; Höwedes 66'; Rakitić 83'; Schmitz (yellow card) 89'	Report	Şahin 47' (pen.); Valdez (yellow card) 56'; Błaszczykowski (yellow card) 68'; Bender (yellow card) 76'; Großkreutz (yellow card) 90+2'	Stadium: Veltins-Arena; Referee: Manuel Gräfe; Assistant referees: Markus Hacker, Tobias Welz; Fourth official: Stefan Trautmann

6 March 2010 25	Borussia Dortmund	3–0	Borussia Mönchengladbach	Dortmund
18:30 CET (UTC+1)	Großkreutz 13'; Zidan 54', 70'	Report	Bradley (yellow card) 50'; Dante (yellow card) 67'; Bobadilla (yellow card) 89'	Stadium: Signal Iduna Park; Referee: Michael Weiner; Assistant referees: Thomas Frank, Norbert Grudzinski; Fourth official: Harm Osmers

13 March 2010 26	VfL Bochum	1–4	Borussia Dortmund	Bochum
15:30 CET (UTC+1)	Marić (red card) 33'; Holtby 53'	Report	Kehl 18'; Zidan 27'; Błaszczykowski (yellow card) 32'; Şahin (yellow card) 59'; Barrios 74', 77'	Stadium: RewirpowerSTADION; Referee: Wolfgang Stark; Assistant referees: Mike Pickel, Jan-Hendrik Salver; Fourth official: Torsten Bauer

20 March 2010 27	Borussia Dortmund	3–0	Bayer Leverkusen	Dortmund
18:30 CET (UTC+1)	Barrios 50', 60'; Rangelov 87'	Report	Vidal (yellow card) 55'	Stadium: Signal Iduna Park; Referee: Florian Meyer; Assistant referees: Carsten Kadach, Frank Willenborg; Fourth official: Holger Henschel

27 March 2010 28	Hertha BSC	0–0	Borussia Dortmund	Berlin
15:30 CET (UTC+1)		Report	Kehl (yellow card) 55'; Błaszczykowski (yellow card) 61'; Hajnal (yellow card) 81'	Stadium: Olympiastadion; Referee: Lutz Wagner; Assistant referees: Bastian Dankert, Georg Schalk; Fourth official: Bibiana Steinhaus

3 April 2010 29	Borussia Dortmund	2–1	Werder Bremen	Dortmund
15:30 CEST (UTC+2)	Großkreutz 9'; Subotić 22'; Błaszczykowski (yellow card) 60'	Report	Hunt 65'; Bargfrede (yellow card) 89'	Stadium: Signal Iduna Park; Referee: Babak Rafati; Assistant referees: Holger Henschel, Patrick Ittrich; Fourth official: Christoph Bornhorst

10 April 2010 30	Mainz 05	1–0	Borussia Dortmund	Mainz
15:30 CEST (UTC+2)	Szalai 30'; Fathi (yellow card) 83'; Müller (yellow card) 90+4'	Report	Schmelzer (yellow card) 84'; Barrios (yellow card) 90+4'	Stadium: Bruchwegstadion; Referee: Deniz Aytekin; Assistant referees: Christian Leicher, Thorsten Schiffner; Fourth official: Walter Hofmann

18 April 2010 31	Borussia Dortmund	1–1	1899 Hoffenheim	Dortmund
15:30 CEST (UTC+2)	Weidenfeller (yellow card) 38'; Valdez 57'; Dedé (yellow card) 62'	Report	Luiz Gustavo (yellow card) 38'; Šimunić (yellow card) 39'; Ibertsberger (yellow card) 61'; Ibišević 89'	Stadium: Signal Iduna Park; Referee: Wolfgang Stark; Assistant referees: Mike Pickel, Jan-Hendrik Salver; Fourth official: Norbert Grudzinski

24 April 2010 32	1. FC Nürnberg	2–3	Borussia Dortmund	Nuremberg
15:30 CEST (UTC+2)	Pinola (yellow card) 26'; Frantz 30'; Eigler 84'	Report	Barrios 27', 62', 77'	Stadium: easyCredit-Stadion; Referee: Knut Kircher; Assistant referees: Robert Kempter, Stefan Lupp; Fourth official: Alexander Schlutius

1 May 2010 33	Borussia Dortmund	1–1	VfL Wolfsburg	Dortmund
15:30 CEST (UTC+2)	Şahin (penalty missed) 35'; Stiepermann 81'	Report	Džeko 69'; Grafite (yellow card) 75'; Hasebe (yellow card) 90'	Stadium: Signal Iduna Park; Referee: Felix Brych; Assistant referees: Marco Achmüller, Robert Hartmann; Fourth official: Frederick Assmuth

8 May 2010 34	SC Freiburg	3–1	Borussia Dortmund	Freiburg
15:30 CEST (UTC+2)	Idrissou (yellow card) 24', (goal) 60'; Banović (yellow card) 29'; Cissé 70', 90+4'	Report	Barrios 47'; Hummels (yellow card) 68'; Stiepermann (yellow card) 88'	Stadium: Badenova-Stadion; Referee: Günter Perl; Assistant referees: Josef Maier, Georg Schalk; Fourth official: Karl Valentin

=== DFB-Pokal ===
1 August 2009 First round	SpVgg Weiden	1–3	Borussia Dortmund	Weiden in der Oberpfalz
15:30 CEST	Méndez 79'	Report	Barrios 24'; Şahin 46'; Zidan 90+2'	Stadium: Stadion am Wasserwerk; Attendance: 9,765; Referee: Tobias Stieler

22 September 2009 Second round	Karlsruher SC	0–3	Borussia Dortmund	Karlsruhe
20:30 CEST		Report	Zidan 3'; Barrios 22', 51'	Stadium: Wildparkstadion; Attendance: 24,864; Referee: Robert Hartmann

27 October 2009 Round of 16	VfL Osnabrück	3–2	Borussia Dortmund	Osnabrück
20:30 CET	Barletta 37', 42'; Siegert 69'	Report	Şahin 55'; Barrios 90+6'	Stadium: Stadion an der Bremer Brücke; Attendance: 16,130; Referee: Guido Winkmann
