= Patrick Owomoyela =

German footballer (born 1979)

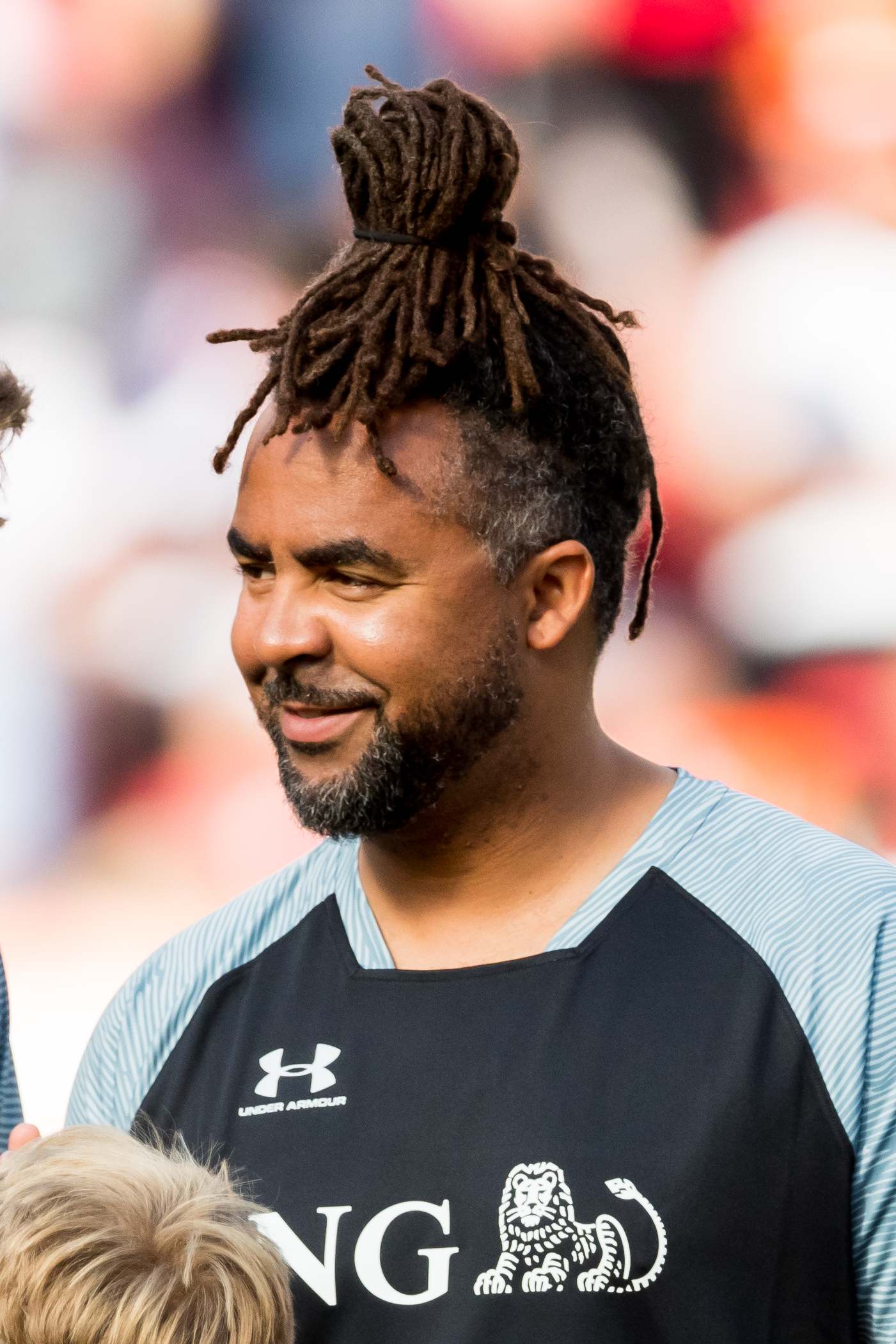
- Owomoyela in 2019

Personal information
- Full name: Patrick Olaiya Olukayode Owomoyela
- Date of birth: 5 November 1979 (age 47)
- Place of birth: Hamburg, West Germany
- Height: 1.87 m (6 ft 2 in)
- Position: Right back

Senior career*
Years	Team	Apps	(Gls)
2000–2001	Lüneburger SK	34	(3)
2001–2002	VfL Osnabrück	33	(1)
2002–2003	SC Paderborn	23	(4)
2003–2005	Arminia Bielefeld	63	(8)
2005–2008	Werder Bremen	50	(0)
2007	Werder Bremen II	1	(0)
2008–2013	Borussia Dortmund	76	(3)
2011–2013	Borussia Dortmund II	8	(2)
2014	Hamburger SV II	12	(0)
Total		300	(21)

International career
2004–2006	Germany	11	(0)
Medal record
Borussia Dortmund
Winner	Bundesliga	2011
Winner	Bundesliga	2012
Winner	DFB-Pokal	2012
- * Club domestic league appearances and goals

Patrick Olaiya Olukayode Owomoyela (German pronunciation: [ˈpatʁɪk ʔovomoˈjɛlaː]; born 5 November 1979) is a German former professional footballer who played mainly as a right-back. He previously played for Lüneburger SK, VfL Osnabrück, SC Paderborn 07, Arminia Bielefeld, SV Werder Bremen, Borussia Dortmund and Hamburger SV II. He was capped by Germany at international level and was a member of the squad at the 2005 FIFA Confederations Cup.

== Club career ==
Owomoyela began his career in lower league German football. In 2003, he made the step up to Arminia Bielefeld, then in the 2. Bundesliga.

Great performances for Bielefeld in the 2004–05 season earned Owomoyela interest from German top clubs, and ahead of the 2005–06 season, he joined SV Werder Bremen. In his first season, Owomoyela was the undisputed starter at right back and helped Bremen reach second in the Bundesliga. With the arrival of Clemens Fritz the following season, however, he lost his starting position due to injuries and bad displays. Owomoyela was finally transferred to Borussia Dortmund at the beginning of the 2008–09 season, where he looked to reestablish himself in German top-flight football.

== International career ==
Owomoyela debuted for Jürgen Klinsmann's Germany national side in an Asian tour, playing 90 minutes in a 3–0 win over Japan, on 16 December 2004, in Yokohama. He later was selected in the Bundestrainer's team for the Confederations Cup in 2005, but was unused there and was finally overlooked for Germany's World Cup final squad. In total he collected eleven caps.

== Post-retirement ==
Following his retirement, Owomoyela became an English language commentator for Bundesliga and DFB-Pokal international broadcasts.

== Personal life ==
In addition to his football skills, Owomoyela is also a basketball player, having played in the German regional league before switching to football full-time. He was born to a German mother and a Nigerian father. His name "Olukayode" stems from the Yoruba words "Olu", a diminutive form of "Oluwa" or Olorun meaning "God" and "Kayode" meaning "to bring joy", which translates to "God brings me joy and happiness".

In the run-up to the 2006 World Cup, the National Democratic Party of Germany (NPD) distributed leaflets showing a Germany jersey with the number 25, and the slogan "White - not just a jersey colour! For a real NATIONAL team!". Owomoyela and the German Football Association filed charges, interpreting the leaflet as directed to Owomoyela due to his squad number and the colour of his skin. In April 2009, NPD leader Udo Voigt and two others were convicted of incitement to racial hatred and defamation, and given suspended prison sentences. The convictions were overturned by the Berlin State Court in March 2011, judging that the number alone was not enough to link the leaflet to Owomoyela, and that "white" has other meanings including good moral character.

In 2021, Owomoyela featured in Schwarze Adler, a documentary detailing the experiences of Black players in German professional football.

== Career statistics ==
=== Club ===
Appearances and goals by club, season and competition
Club	Season	League			DFB-Pokal		Europe		Other		Total	
Club	Season	Division	Apps	Goals	Apps	Goals	Apps	Goals	Apps	Goals	Apps	Goals
Lüneburger SK	2000–01	Regionalliga Nord	34	3	0	0	–		–		34	3
VfL Osnabrück	2001–02	Regionalliga Nord	33	1	1	0	–		–		34	1
SC Paderborn	2002–03	Regionalliga Nord	23	4	1	0	–		–		24	4
Arminia Bielefeld	2003–04	2. Bundesliga	33	3	1	0	–		–		34	3
Arminia Bielefeld	2004–05	Bundesliga	30	5	4	1	–		–		34	6
Arminia Bielefeld	Total		63	8	5	1	0	0	0	0	68	9
Werder Bremen	2005–06	Bundesliga	32	0	4	0	10 (Note: Appearances in UEFA Champions League)	0	–		46	0
Werder Bremen	2006–07	Bundesliga	9	0	1	0	6	0	1 (Note: Appearance in DFB-Ligapokal)	0	17	0
Werder Bremen	2007–08	Bundesliga	9	0	1	0	3	0	–		13	0
Werder Bremen	Total		50	0	6	0	19	0	1	0	76	0
Werder Bremen II	2006–07	Regionalliga Nord	1	0	0	0	–		–		1	0
Werder Bremen II	2007–08	Regionalliga Nord	0	0	1	0	–		–		1	0
Werder Bremen II	Total		1	0	1	0	0	0	0	0	2	0
Borussia Dortmund	2008–09	Bundesliga	26	1	0	0	–		–		26	1
Borussia Dortmund	2009–10	Bundesliga	33	1	3	0	–		–		36	1
Borussia Dortmund	2010–11	Bundesliga	6	0	1	0	3 (Note: Appearances in UEFA Europa League)	0	–		10	0
Borussia Dortmund	2011–12	Bundesliga	11	1	1	0	0	0	–		12	1
Borussia Dortmund	2012–13	Bundesliga	0	0	0	0	0	0	–		0	0
Borussia Dortmund	Total		76	3	5	0	3	0	0	0	84	3
Borussia Dortmund II	2010–11	Regionalliga West	3	0	0	0	–		–		3	0
Borussia Dortmund II	2011–12	Regionalliga West	3	2	0	0	–		–		3	2
Borussia Dortmund II	2012–13	3. Liga	2	0	0	0	–		–		2	0
Borussia Dortmund II	Total		8	2	0	0	0	0	0	0	8	2
Hamburger SV II	2013–14	Regionalliga Nord	12	0	0	0	–		–		12	0
Career total			300	21	19	1	22	0	1	0	342	22

=== International ===
Appearances and goals by national team and year
National team	Year	Apps	Goals
Germany	2004	3	0
Germany	2005	7	0
Germany	2006	1	0
Total		11	0

== Honours ==
Werder Bremen

- DFL-Ligapokal: 2006

Borussia Dortmund

- Bundesliga: 2010–11, 2011–12
- DFB-Pokal: 2011–12
