= Kevin Großkreutz =

German footballer (born 1988)

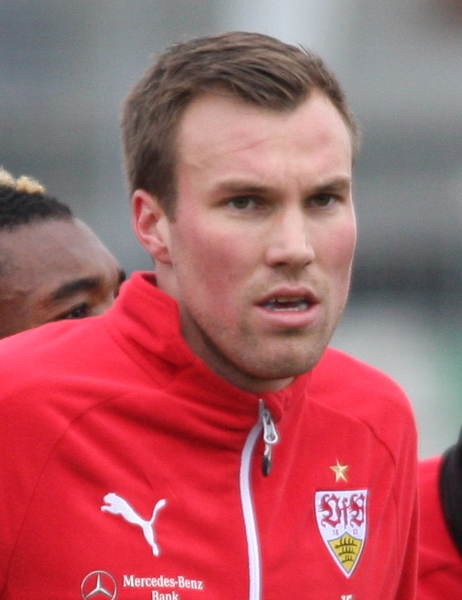
- Großkreutz with VfB Stuttgart in 2016

Personal information
- Full name: Kevin Großkreutz
- Date of birth: 19 July 1988 (age 38)
- Place of birth: Dortmund, West Germany
- Height: 1.86 m (6 ft 1 in)
- Positions: Right-back; winger

Team information
- Current team: Eichinghofen
- Number: 19

Youth career
- 1992–1995: DJK Rot-Weiß Obereving
- 1995–1999: VfL Kemminghausen
- 1999–2002: FC Merkur 07 Dortmund
- 2002–2003: Borussia Dortmund
- 2003–2006: Rot Weiss Ahlen

Senior career*
Years	Team	Apps	(Gls)
2006–2007	Rot Weiss Ahlen II	2	(2)
2006–2009	Rot Weiss Ahlen	94	(24)
2009–2015	Borussia Dortmund	176	(23)
2015	Borussia Dortmund II	6	(0)
2016	Galatasaray	0	(0)
2016–2017	VfB Stuttgart	26	(1)
2017–2018	Darmstadt 98	27	(3)
2018–2020	KFC Uerdingen	45	(0)
2021–2023	TuS Bövinghausen	52	(9)
2023–2025	SV Wacker Obercastrop	50	(5)
2025–	Eichlinghofen	0	(0)

International career
2010	Germany U21	1	(1)
2010–2014	Germany	6	(0)
Medal record
Men's football
Representing Germany
FIFA World Cup
Winner	2014 Brazil
- * Club domestic league appearances and goals as of 17 February 2023

Kevin Großkreutz (born 19 July 1988) is a semi-retired German professional footballer who plays as a right back and winger for TuS Eichlinghofen.

He made his senior debut at Rot Weiss Ahlen, and in 2009 joined Borussia Dortmund of the Bundesliga, making 233 appearances for them across all competitions and scoring 27 goals. His honours during his time at the Westfalenstadion included two consecutive Bundesliga titles, including a double in 2012.

In summer 2015, after featuring sparingly at Borussia Dortmund, Großkreutz moved to Süper Lig club Galatasaray where he did not make a single appearance in half a season. He returned to the Bundesliga signing with VfB Stuttgart in January 2016. In March 2017 his contract was terminated after he was involved in a bar fight. A month later, he joined 2. Bundesliga side Darmstadt 98. After one season with Darmstadt 98, he spent two seasons with KFC Uerdingen 05 in the 3. Liga before joining TüS Bövninghausen in January 2021

A full international for Germany between 2010 and 2014, he was part of their team which won the 2014 FIFA World Cup.

== Club career ==
=== Early career ===
Großkreutz began his career with the Dortmund clubs DJK Rot-Weiß Obereving, VfL Kemminghausen and FC Merkur 07. In 2002, he joined Borussia Dortmund, where he played until he moved to Rot Weiss Ahlen. Promoted to first team in 2006, he led the club to promotion to the 2. Bundesliga in 2008. He scored 12 goals and was named in the German sports magazine's kicker XI of the year. Großkreutz performed in the 2nd tier of the German league pyramid well too and went up to the German top-flight after the 2008-09 season.

=== Borussia Dortmund ===
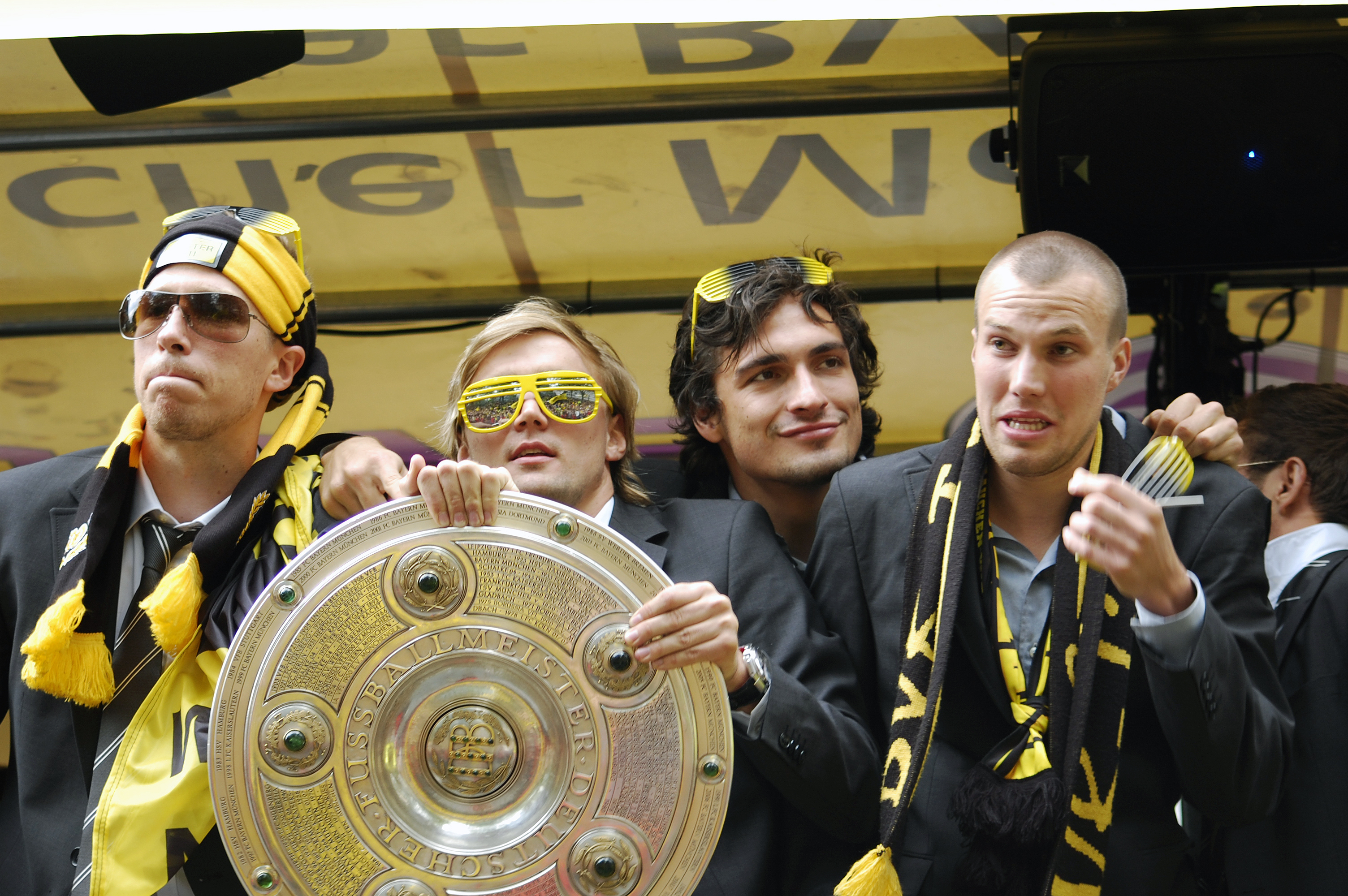
Borussia Dortmund players (from left to right: Marco Stiepermann, Marcel Schmelzer, Mats Hummels and Kevin Großkreutz) celebrate winning the Bundesliga in 2011.

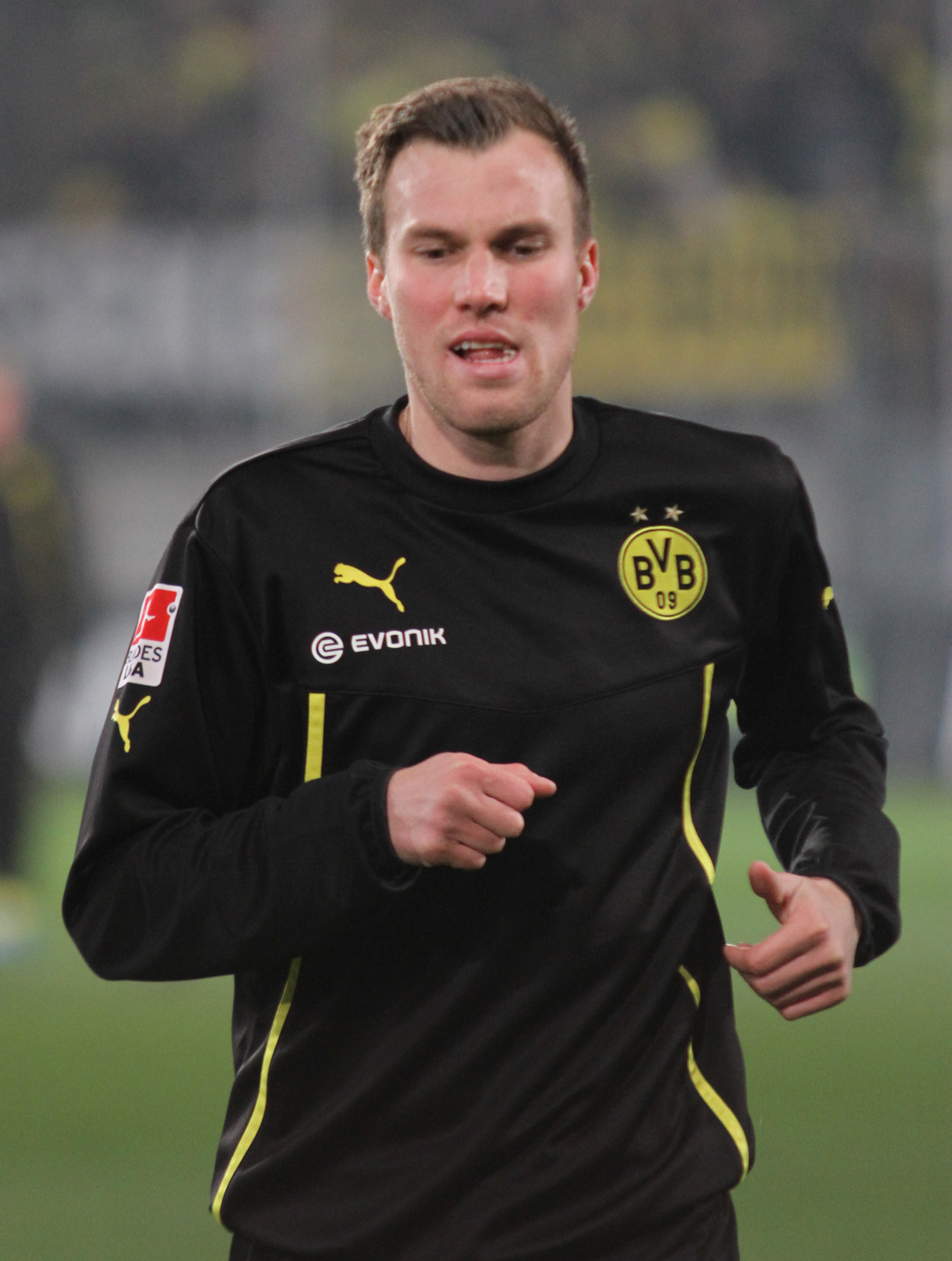
Großkreutz with Borussia Dortmund in 2014

He opened his account with Dortmund on 5 December 2009 in a 4–0 victory over 1. FC Nürnberg. Sven Bender provided him with a diagonal pass that Großkreutz tucked past Alexander Stephan in goal to give Dortmund a 1–0 lead on eight minutes.

Großkreutz opened his goalscoring account for the new season on 22 September 2010, finishing a nice play as Dortmund thrashed 1. FC Kaiserslautern 5–0. In the following round of fixtures, Dortmund faced promoted side FC St. Pauli at the Millerntor-Stadion in Hamburg. Großkreutz scored two goals on either side of a Shinji Kagawa strike as Dortmund won 3–1 with Großkreutz being named man of the match. On 29 November 2010, Großkreutz signed a four-year contract extension to stay with Dortmund until July 2014. He was involved in all three goals on 14 January 2011, scoring two and providing an assist for Mario Götze, as Dortmund defeated Bayer Leverkusen 3–1 at the BayArena. Großkreutz had a phenomenal second season with Dortmund, netting eight goals and managing seven assists as die Borussen lifted the Bundesliga title.

Großkreutz figured in Borussia Dortmund's 4–2 victory over Bayern Munich on 27 July 2013, at BVB's Signal Iduna Park, Dortmund to lift the 2013 DFL-Supercup.

On 11 December 2013, Großkreutz scored the winning goal away to Marseille in a 2–1 UEFA Champions League win to qualify Dortmund for the knockout phase.

From April to August 2015, Großkreutz was demoted to Borussia Dortmund II, for whom he played 6 times in lower divisions. In September 2015 he was sold to Galatasaray. However, the deal was not completed before the closure of the transfer window.

=== Galatasaray ===
On 2 September 2015, it was announced by FIFA that Galatasaray had failed to submit the relevant documentation for Großkreutz before the transfer window closed. As a result FIFA refused to sanction Großkreutz's proposed move from Borussia Dortmund to Galatasaray, and the player was ineligible to play any matches until 1 January 2016. Großkreutz signed a three-year contract worth an average of about €1.6 million per season, plus €20,000 per match bonus. Dortmund received a €1.5 million transfer fee and an extra €250,000 if Galatasaray qualified for the UEFA Champions League.

=== VfB Stuttgart ===
On 6 January 2016, having not made a single competitive appearance for Galatasaray, Großkreutz returned to Germany to join VfB Stuttgart for about €2.2 million.

On 3 March 2017, the contract of Großkreutz was mutually terminated hours after he got into a bar fight. Großkreutz said in a statement on the club website that he "made a mistake" and he wants "nothing to do with football for the time being."

=== Darmstadt 98 ===
In April 2017, one month after his departure from VfB Stuttgart, Großkreutz signed with 2. Bundesliga club SV Darmstadt 98 for the 2017–18 season until 2019. He gave his pre-season debut in a warm-up fixture against SG Modau on 23 June 2017.

=== KFC Uerdingen ===
On 5 July 2018, Großkreutz joined KFC Uerdingen 05. His contract was terminated by the club in October 2020.

On 24 January 2021, Großkreutz announced his retirement from professional football.

=== TuS Bövinghausen ===
On 26 January 2021, Großkreutz joined TuS Bövinghausen in the sixth-tier Westfalenliga. At the end of the 2021–22 season, the club was promoted to the fifth-tier Oberliga Westfalen. On 27 August 2022, Großkreutz extended his contract with the club until 2025.

== International career ==
Großkreutz made his full international debut in a friendly match against Malta on 13 May 2010, helping set up striker Cacau for one of his two goals in a 3–0 win. He next appeared for Germany as a starter against Sweden in a 0–0 draw on 18 November 2010.

In June 2014, he was named in Germany's squad for the 2014 FIFA World Cup. Germany went on to win the tournament, though Großkreutz did not make any appearance during the competition. His sixth and last cap came later in this summer in an international friendly against World Cup final opponent Argentina.

== Personal life ==
Großkreutz is a lifelong Borussia Dortmund supporter, growing up and living in the Dortmund area until his move away from the club.

== Career statistics ==
=== Club ===
Appearances and goals by club, season and competition
Club	Season	League			DFB-Pokal		Europe		Other		Total	
Club	Season	Division	Apps	Goals	Apps	Goals	Apps	Goals	Apps	Goals	Apps	Goals
Rot Weiss Ahlen II	2006–07	Oberliga Westfalen	2	2	—		—		—		2	2
Rot Weiss Ahlen	2006–07	Regionalliga Nord	27	6	—		—		—		27	6
Rot Weiss Ahlen	2007–08	Regionalliga Nord	35	12	1	0	—		—		36	12
Rot Weiss Ahlen	2008–09	2. Bundesliga	32	6	1	0	—		—		33	6
Rot Weiss Ahlen	Total		94	24	2	0	0	0	0	0	96	24
Borussia Dortmund	2009–10	Bundesliga	32	5	1	0	—		—		33	5
Borussia Dortmund	2010–11	Bundesliga	34	8	2	1	7 (Note: Appearances in UEFA Europa League)	0	—		43	9
Borussia Dortmund	2011–12	Bundesliga	31	7	6	0	5 (Note: Appearances in UEFA Champions League)	1	1 (Note: Appearance in DFL-Supercup)	0	43	8
Borussia Dortmund	2012–13	Bundesliga	29	2	4	0	10	0	1	0	44	2
Borussia Dortmund	2013–14	Bundesliga	33	1	6	1	10	1	1	0	50	3
Borussia Dortmund	2014–15	Bundesliga	17	0	2	0	4	0	—		23	0
Borussia Dortmund	Total		176	23	21	2	36	2	3	0	236	27
Borussia Dortmund II	2014–15	3. Liga	2	0	—		—		—		2	0
Borussia Dortmund II	2015–16	Regionalliga West	4	0	—		—		—		4	0
Borussia Dortmund II	Total		6	0	0	0	0	0	0	0	6	0
Galatasaray	2015–16	Süper Lig	0	0	0	0	0	0	0	0	0	0
VfB Stuttgart	2015–16	Bundesliga	10	0	1	0	—		—		11	0
VfB Stuttgart	2016–17	2. Bundesliga	16	1	1	0	—		—		17	1
VfB Stuttgart	Total		26	1	2	0	0	0	0	0	28	1
Darmstadt 98	2017–18	2. Bundesliga	27	3	1	0	—		—		28	3
KFC Uerdingen	2018–19	3. Liga	33	0	0	0	—		—		33	0
KFC Uerdingen	2019–20	3. Liga	12	0	1	0	—		—		13	0
KFC Uerdingen	Total		45	0	1	0	0	0	0	0	46	0
Career total			376	53	27	2	36	2	3	0	442	57

=== International ===
Appearances and goals by national team and year
National team	Year	Apps	Goals
Germany	2010	2	0
Germany	2011	1	0
Germany	2012	0	0
Germany	2013	0	0
Germany	2014	3	0
Total		6	0

== Honours ==
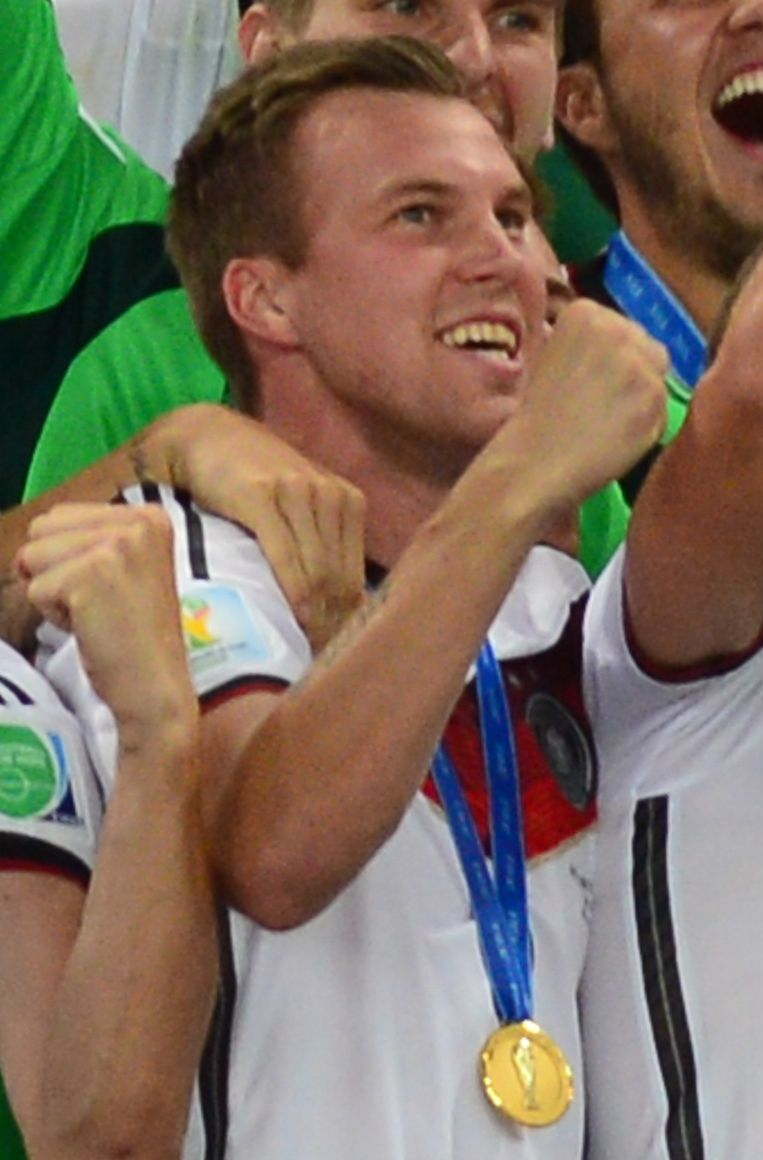
Großkreutz after the 2014 FIFA World Cup Final

Borussia Dortmund

- Bundesliga: 2010–11, 2011–12
- DFB-Pokal: 2011–12
- DFL-Supercup: 2013, 2014
- UEFA Champions League runner-up: 2012–13

Germany

- FIFA World Cup: 2014
