= Damien Le Tallec =

French footballer (born 1990)

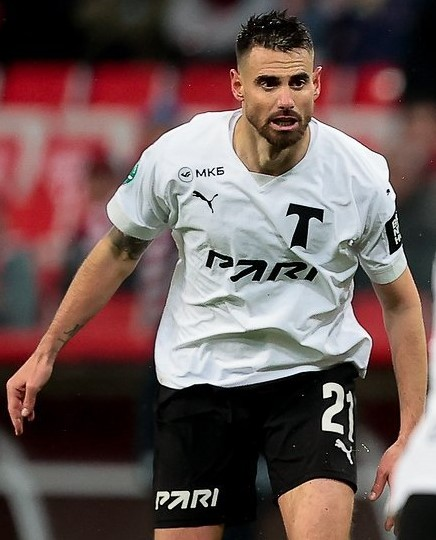
- Le Tallec with Torpedo Moscow in 2022

Personal information
- Full name: Damien Le Tallec
- Date of birth: 19 April 1990 (age 36)
- Place of birth: Poissy, France
- Height: 1.87 m (6 ft 2 in)
- Positions: Defensive midfielder; centre-back

Team information
- Current team: Zenit Saint Petersburg (advisor)

Youth career
- 1995–2005: Le Havre
- 2005–2008: Rennes

Senior career*
Years	Team	Apps	(Gls)
2009	Rennes	0	(0)
2009–2011	Borussia Dortmund	4	(0)
2009–2011	→ Borussia Dortmund II	43	(14)
2012	Nantes	8	(0)
2012–2014	Hoverla Uzhhorod	41	(7)
2014–2015	Mordovia Saransk	44	(1)
2016–2018	Red Star Belgrade	76	(6)
2018–2021	Montpellier	87	(5)
2021–2022	AEK Athens	24	(1)
2022	Torpedo Moscow	9	(0)
2023	Sochaux	10	(0)
2023	Hanoi FC	5	(0)
Total		351	(34)

International career
2007	France U17	9	(5)
2008	France U18	1	(0)
2008–2009	France U19	5	(1)

Managerial career
- 2024–: Zenit Saint Petersburg (advisor)
- * Club domestic league appearances and goals

Damien Le Tallec (born 19 April 1990) is a French professional football official and a former centre-back. He works as an advisor with the Russian club Zenit St. Petersburg.

A former France youth international, Le Tallec appeared with the under-17s, under-18s, and under-19s across his career. Although initially fielded as a second striker and occasionally on the wings, in his later career, he has primarily played as a defensive midfielder and centre-back.

== Club career ==
=== Early career ===
Le Tallec was born in Poissy. He began his career at Le Havre joining the club at only five years of age. He spent a full decade at the club and began drawing interests from several clubs in Ligue 1. He eventually joined Stade Rennais.

=== Rennes ===
Le Tallec quickly established himself at the club joining fellow prospects Yann M'Vila, Yohann Lasimant, Abdoul Camara, and Yacine Brahimi as the club's most promising players. The foursome were particularly instrumental in the club's successes on the youth level, helping their age groups win the 2006 edition of the under-16 Tournoi Carisport, as well as capturing the under-18 championship for the 2006–07 season, and also winning the Coupe Gambardella in 2008, scoring an impressive eight goals in seven matches. In the Coupe Gambardella final against Bordeaux, he scored the final goal in the team's convincing 3–0 victory. Following the 2006–07 season, on 11 August, Le Tallec, alongside teammates M'Vila and Camara, signed his first professional contract, agreeing to a three-year deal. He spent the entire season in the reserves, before being officially promoted to the senior squad and assigned the number 22 shirt for the 2008–09 season.

Though on the first-team, Le Tallec began the season with the club's Championnat de France amateur team. He appeared in 22 matches, scoring four goals, helping the side finish 1st among professional clubs in their group, thus qualifying for the playoffs, where they lost to Lyon in the semi-finals.

=== Borussia Dortmund ===
Following the season, news came that Le Tallec had become unsettled at Rennes, primarily due to his limited first-team opportunities at the club. Eager to begin his professional career, he was primarily linked to La Liga club Valencia and was reportedly in the process of joining the club, but due to a shake up in the club's front office, the move was put on hold and eventually called off. He was later linked with moves to German clubs Hertha BSC and VfB Stuttgart. Two months later, on 8 August 2009, another German club, Borussia Dortmund, announced that they had signed the player to a three-year contract and that he will be gradually introduced to the first team.

=== Nantes ===
On 31 January 2012, Le Tallec returned to France, signing with Nantes in Ligue 2.

=== Hoverla ===
The following two seasons, Le Tallec played with FC Hoverla Uzhhorod in the Ukrainian Premier League. The club had just won the second tier last season and were searching for reinforcements, among them, Le Tallec. Despite the fact that during the two seasons Le Tallec spent in Hoverla, Hoverla performed rather mid-down table, Le Tallec was regular and his performances caught the attention of numerous clubs.

=== Mordovia ===
In the summer of 2014, Le Tallec moved to Russia and signed with Premier League side FC Mordovia Saransk. Mordovia had just won the second tier and got promoted to the Premier League. Same as in Hoverla, at Mordovia, Le Tallec also performed regularly. By the winter-break of the 2015–16 season, coach Miodrag Božović, a specialist of Russian football as he had just spent 8 years coaching in Russian Premier League, was in held of Serbian side Red Star Belgrade, who were forming a strong team in order to take the title from their main rivals FK Partizan, who had become chronic winners in the last decade, and in that built-up of the team, Božović made a priority of signing both Mordovia players, Le Tallec and Mitchell Donald, and both ended up moving to Belgrade.

=== Red Star Belgrade ===
On 29 January 2016, Le Tallec signed a 2.5-year contract with Red Star Belgrade. In his league debut with Red Star less than a month later, he scored a goal against FK Mladost Lučani. At the end of his first season at Red Star, they won the Serbian championship and qualified for a berth in the Champions League qualifying rounds.

Having played most of the former season as central midfielder, along Mitchell Donald, since start of the 2016–17 season, Le Tallec was often adapted as central defender by Red Star coach Miodrag Božović. While with Red Star Belgrade, Le Tallec made 104 appearances and scored 7 goals in all competitions and won 2 Serbian SuperLiga titles, between 2016 and 2018. In May 2018, Le Tallec announced that he would leave the club definitely in the summer the same year, after the end of his contract.

=== Montpellier ===
On 20 June 2018, Le Tallec returned to his home country and signed with Ligue 1 club Montpellier.

=== AEK Athens ===
On 9 July 2021, Le Tallec was announced as the new signing of Greek Super League club AEK Athens, having signed a two-year contract, with the option for one more year extension once it's over.

On 12 September, he scored the opening goal with a header in the 7th minute against Ionikos, in a game which ended in a 3–0 win for the hosts.

=== Torpedo Moscow ===
On 30 August 2022, Le Tallec returned to Russia and signed with Torpedo Moscow. His contract with Torpedo was terminated by mutual consent on 13 January 2023.

=== Sochaux ===
On 31 January 2023, Le Tallec signed a contract with Sochaux-Montbéliard until 30 June 2024.

=== Hanoi FC ===
On 8 September 2023, Le Tallec joined Vietnamese side Hanoi FC on a short-term contract. He made his debut in a 4–2 away loss against Pohang Steelers on 20 September.

== International career ==
Le Tallec has featured for all of France's national youth teams, beginning with the under-15 team, earning his first selection in March 2006. He was a member of the under-17 team that reached the semi-finals at the 2007 UEFA European Under-17 Football Championship, before losing to England. He scored two goals in the tournament, both of them in the same game against Germany. He later played with the same under-17 team at the 2007 FIFA U-17 World Cup held in South Korea. Le Tallec appeared in all five matches, scoring four goals, one against Haiti, a brace against Tunisia in the Round of 16, and one against Spain whom defeated France on penalties in the quarterfinals. In total with the under-17s, Le Tallec scored 14 goals in 18 appearances.

With the under-19 team, Le Tallec appeared in 15 matches, scoring 6 goals. He scored three of those goals during the qualification process for the UEFA U-19 Championship against the Republic of Ireland, Liechtenstein, and Romania. The victory over Romania assured qualification to the tournament. At the tournament, held in Ukraine, Le Tallec appeared in all four matches, helping France reach the semi-finals before suffering defeat to England.

In 2019, Le Tallec started the process of applying for Russian citizenship, and said he would be honoured if he were to be called up to the Russia national team after the process was complete. In April 2020, he was granted permanent residency in Russia before receiving Russian citizenship in October. It was reported that he was not eligible to play for Russia as he had already played in official international matches for the youth teams of France.

== Post-playing career ==
On 24 April 2024, Le Tallec was appointed as an advisor to the chairman of the board of the Russian champions Zenit St. Petersburg, responsible for partnership and scouting in Europe, Africa and the Near East.

== Personal life ==
Le Tallec is the younger brother of Anthony Le Tallec, and cousin of Florent Sinama Pongolle.

== Career statistics ==
As of match played 6 December 2023

Appearances and goals by club, season and competition
Club	Season	League			Cup		Continental		Other		Total	
Club	Season	Division	Apps	Goals	Apps	Goals	Apps	Goals	Apps	Goals	Apps	Goals
Rennes	2008–09	Ligue 1	0	0	0	0	0	0	0	0	0	0
Borussia Dortmund	2009–10	Bundesliga	4	0	1	0	—		—		5	0
Borussia Dortmund	2010–11	Bundesliga	0	0	1	0	2	0	—		3	0
Borussia Dortmund	2011–12	Bundesliga	0	0	0	0	0	0	0	0	0	0
Borussia Dortmund	Total		4	0	2	0	2	0	0	0	8	0
Borussia Dortmund II	2009–10	3. Liga	8	2	—		—		—		8	2
Borussia Dortmund II	2010–11	Regionalliga West	24	11	—		—		—		24	11
Borussia Dortmund II	2011–12	Regionalliga West	11	1	—		—		—		11	1
Borussia Dortmund II	Total		43	14	—		—		—		43	14
Nantes	2011–12	Ligue 2	8	0	—		—		—		8	0
Hoverla	2012–13	Ukrainian Premier League	20	5	2	0	—		—		22	5
Hoverla	2013–14	Ukrainian Premier League	21	2	1	0	—		—		22	2
Hoverla	Total		41	7	3	0	—		—		44	7
Mordovia	2014–15	Russian Premier League	29	1	2	0	—		—		31	1
Mordovia	2015–16	Russian Premier League	15	1	0	0	—		—		15	1
Mordovia	Total		44	2	2	0	—		—		46	2
Red Star Belgrade	2015–16	Serbian SuperLiga	14	2	—		—		—		14	2
Red Star Belgrade	2016–17	Serbian SuperLiga	36	3	6	1	6	0	—		48	4
Red Star Belgrade	2017–18	Serbian SuperLiga	26	1	1	0	15	0	—		42	1
Red Star Belgrade	Total		76	6	7	1	21	0	—		104	7
Montpellier	2018–19	Ligue 1	36	3	1	0	—		0	0	37	3
Montpellier	2019–20	Ligue 1	28	2	3	0	—		2	0	33	2
Montpellier	2020–21	Ligue 1	23	0	4	0	—		—		27	0
Montpellier	Total		87	5	8	0	—		2	0	97	5
AEK Athens	2021–22	Super League Greece	24	1	4	0	2	0	—		30	1
Torpedo Moscow	2022–23	Premier League	9	0	2	0	—		—		11	0
Sochaux	2022–23	Ligue 2	10	0	0	0	—		—		10	0
Hanoi FC	2023–24	V.League 1	0	0	0	0	5	0	—		5	0
Career total			346	35	28	1	30	0	2	0	406	36

== Honours ==
Rennes

- Coupe Gambardella: 2008

Borussia Dortmund

- Bundesliga: 2010–11

Red Star Belgrade

- Serbian SuperLiga: 2015–16, 2017–18
