= Sven Bender =

German footballer (born 1989)

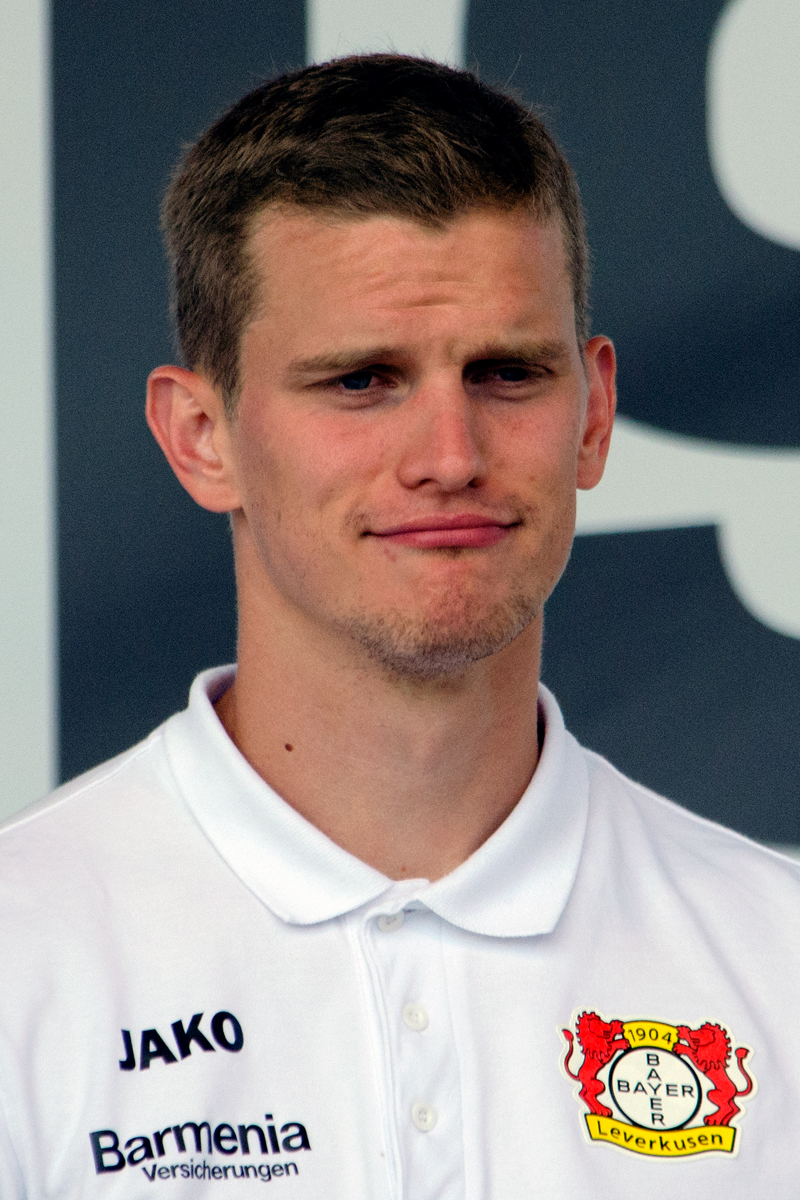
- Bender with Bayer Leverkusen in 2018

Personal information
- Full name: Sven Bender
- Date of birth: 27 April 1989 (age 37)
- Place of birth: Rosenheim, West Germany
- Height: 1.86 m (6 ft 1 in)
- Positions: Centre-back; defensive midfielder

Team information
- Current team: Germany (assistant coach)

Youth career
- 1993–1999: TSV Brannenburg
- 1999–2002: SpVgg Unterhaching
- 2002–2006: 1860 Munich

Senior career*
Years	Team	Apps	(Gls)
2006–2007	1860 Munich II	16	(2)
2006–2009	1860 Munich	65	(1)
2009–2012	Borussia Dortmund II	4	(0)
2009–2017	Borussia Dortmund	158	(4)
2017–2021	Bayer Leverkusen	107	(4)
Total		350	(11)

International career
2005–2006	Germany U17	10	(0)
2007–2008	Germany U19	11	(1)
2009	Germany U20	3	(2)
2010–2013	Germany	7	(0)
2016	Germany Olympic	6	(0)

Managerial career
- 2023–2024: Borussia Dortmund (assistant)
- 2024–2026: SpVgg Unterhaching
- 2026–: Germany (assistant)
Medal record
Olympic Games
Silver medal – second place	2016 Rio de Janeiro	Team
- * Club domestic league appearances and goals

Sven Bender (German pronunciation: [ˈsvɛn ˈbɛndɐ]; born 27 April 1989) is a German professional football coach and former player who played as a centre-back or defensive midfielder. He is currently the assistant coach of the Germany national team.

He is the twin brother of fellow coach and former player Lars Bender.

== Club career ==
=== Early career ===
Having been a product of their academy since the age of 4, Bender played from 1993 to 1999 in the youth of TSV Brannenburg. From 1999 to 2002, he was part of SpVgg Unterhaching youth teams. In summer 2002, Bender moved to the 1860 München youth team.

=== 1860 Munich ===
He started his football career on the U-14 team and played for all of 1860 München's youth teams in three years. In November 2007, Bender extended his contract with the club until 2011. In 2009, Munich had to sell both Lars and Sven Bender, due to club's financial problem. Sven moved to Borussia Dortmund and Lars moved to Bayer Leverkusen. Sven played 65 games and scored 1 goal for 1860 Munich.

=== Borussia Dortmund ===
On 1 July 2009, Bender joined Borussia Dortmund, where he signed a four-year contract that tied him to the club until 2013. Bender made his Bundesliga debut on 19 September 2009 in a game against Hannover 96. His biggest rival for the spot in the defensive midfield suffered several injuries and Bender established himself in the starting eleven very quickly. He scored his first Bundesliga goal on 12 February 2011 against 1. FC Kaiserslautern and extended his contract until 2017. The years 2011 and 2012 were very successful for Bender, as he was an important player in Dortmund's midfield and helped the team win the national championship in both years as well as the DFB-Pokal in 2012. On 6 January 2013, Bender extended his contract with Dortmund, keeping him at the club until 2017. During the 2012–13 season, he was struggling with several injuries which made Dortmund sign Nuri Şahin in January 2013. After treatment of his injury, Bender got another opponent for his position. He was on his way to becoming the number one player on his position and shared a place with team's captain Sebastian Kehl and helped the team to reach 2013 UEFA Champions League Final, although they were defeated by their domestic rivals Bayern Munich. On 27 July 2013, Bender won the 2013 DFL-Supercup with Dortmund 4–2 against Bayern Munich. In February 2014, he suffered injury after a loss against Hamburger SV, which eventually ruled him out for the rest season. On 21 February 2016, Bender signed a five-year contract extension to keep him at the club until 2021.

=== Bayer Leverkusen ===
On 13 July 2017, Bender ended his eight-year stay at Borussia Dortmund, signing a four-year contract with fellow Bundesliga side Bayer Leverkusen until July 2021, and re-uniting with his brother Lars. Nearing the conclusion of the 2020–21 season, Leverkusen announced that both Sven and Lars would depart Leverkusen and retire from professional football after the end of the season. In May 2021, Sven Bender started the last match of his career against former club Borussia Dortmund, where he played until coming off for his brother Lars, who later scored a penalty in an eventual 1–3 loss.

== International career ==
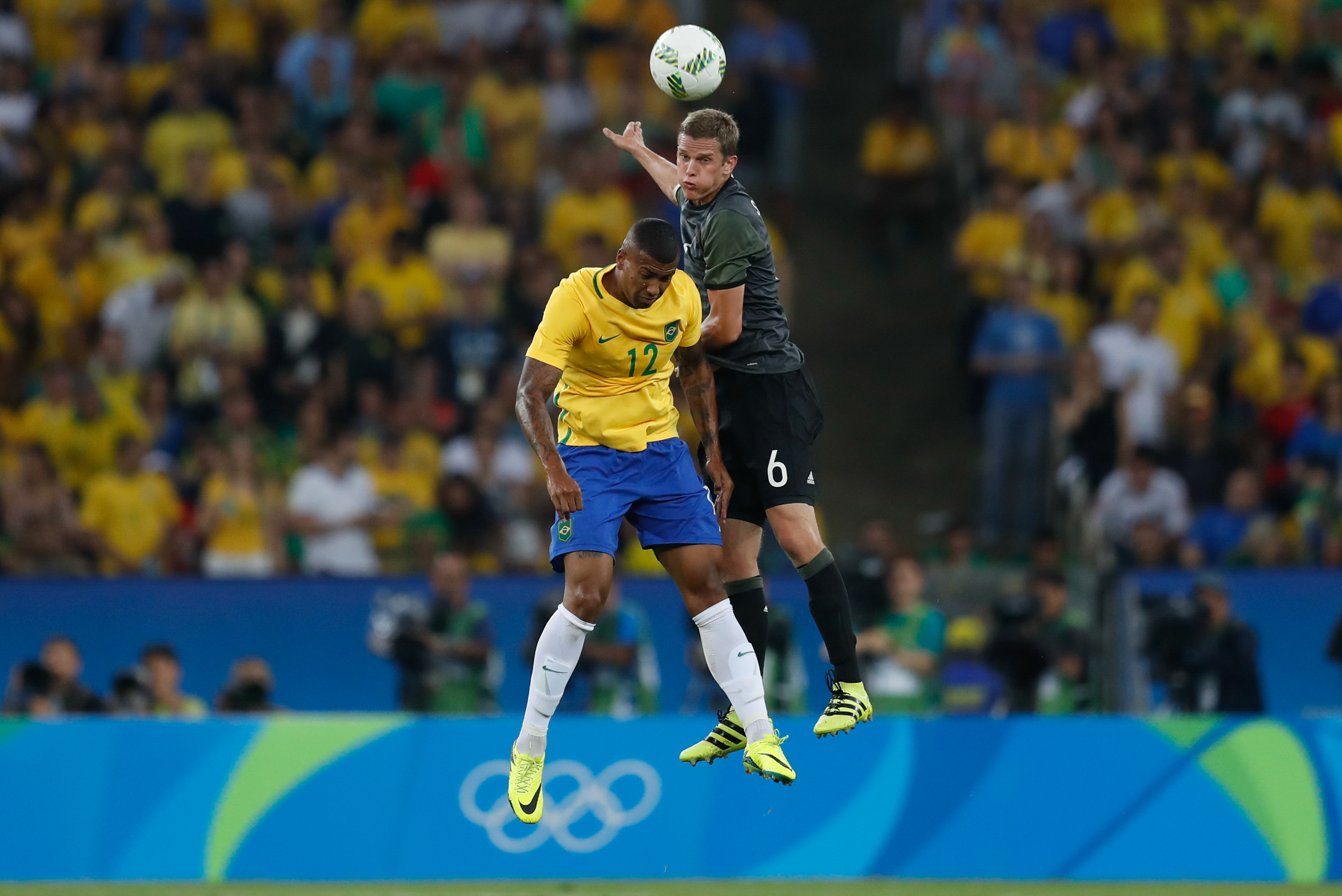
Bender playing for Germany against Brazil in 2016

At under-19 level, Bender was a part of the team that won the 2008 European Under-19 Championship. He and his twin brother Lars were named jointly as players of the tournament. Bender made his debut for the senior team in a friendly match against Australia in March 2011. He appeared in several more friendly games and nominated for the Euro 2012 but did not make the squad's final. In February 2014, Bender suffered an Osteitis pubis injury that ruled him out for the 2014 FIFA World Cup. His last internationals therefore were two friendlies in late 2013. In mid-July on 2016, despite not being called up for the senior team since 2013, he made the spot for Germany Olympic football team for the 2016 Summer Olympics as one of three over 23 years old players along with his brother and Nils Petersen, where Germany won the silver medal.

== Coaching career ==
In June 2022, the German Football Association appointed him as the new assistant coach of the Germany U-16 national team. During the summer of 2023, he became assistant coach of the German U-17s.

On 29 December 2023, Bender left his job at the German Football Association and, along with his past teammate Nuri Şahin, was appointed as assistant manager to Edin Terzić at their former club Borussia Dortmund, signing a contract until the end of the season.

He became the interim head coach of SpVgg Unterhaching in December 2024 for the remainder of the year. He took over the same role in March 2025.

On 24 July 2026, Bender was appointed as Jürgen Klopp's assistant coach with the Germany national team.

== Career statistics ==
=== Club ===
Appearances and goals by club, season and competition
Club	Season	League			DFB-Pokal		Europe		Other		Total	
Club	Season	Division	Apps	Goals	Apps	Goals	Apps	Goals	Apps	Goals	Apps	Goals
1860 Munich II	2006–07	Regionalliga Süd	15	2	—		—		—		15	2
1860 Munich II	2007–08	Regionalliga Süd	1	0	—		—		—		1	0
1860 Munich II	Total		16	2	0	0	0	0	0	0	16	2
1860 Munich	2006–07	2. Bundesliga	13	0	0	0	—		—		13	0
1860 Munich	2007–08	2. Bundesliga	27	1	3	0	—		—		30	1
1860 Munich	2008–09	2. Bundesliga	25	0	1	0	—		—		26	0
1860 Munich	Total		65	1	4	0	0	0	0	0	69	1
Borussia Dortmund II	2009–10	3. Liga	3	0	—		—		—		3	0
Borussia Dortmund II	2012–13	3. Liga	1	0	—		—		—		1	0
Borussia Dortmund II	Total		4	0	0	0	0	0	0	0	4	0
Borussia Dortmund	2009–10	Bundesliga	19	0	0	0	—		—		19	0
Borussia Dortmund	2010–11	Bundesliga	31	1	1	0	7 (Note: Appearance(s) in UEFA Europa League)	0	—		39	1
Borussia Dortmund	2011–12	Bundesliga	24	1	3	0	4 (Note: Appearance(s) in UEFA Champions League)	0	1 (Note: Appearance in DFL-Supercup)	0	32	1
Borussia Dortmund	2012–13	Bundesliga	20	1	1	0	11	0	0	0	32	1
Borussia Dortmund	2013–14	Bundesliga	19	1	2	0	5	0	1	0	27	1
Borussia Dortmund	2014–15	Bundesliga	20	0	5	0	6	0	1	0	32	0
Borussia Dortmund	2015–16	Bundesliga	19	0	5	0	11	0	—		35	0
Borussia Dortmund	2016–17	Bundesliga	6	0	1	0	1	0	0	0	8	0
Borussia Dortmund	Total		158	4	18	0	45	0	3	0	224	4
Bayer Leverkusen	2017–18	Bundesliga	29	2	5	0	—		—		34	2
Bayer Leverkusen	2018–19	Bundesliga	27	0	2	0	3	0	—		32	0
Bayer Leverkusen	2019–20	Bundesliga	33	2	5	1	9	1	—		47	4
Bayer Leverkusen	2020–21	Bundesliga	18	0	1	0	1	0	—		20	0
Bayer Leverkusen	Total		107	4	13	1	13	1	0	0	133	6
Career total			350	11	35	1	58	1	3	0	446	13

== Personal life ==
On 20 June 2015, Bender married Simone Dettendorfer, his long time girlfriend since 2008.

== Honours ==
Player
Borussia Dortmund

- Bundesliga: 2010–11, 2011–12
- DFB-Pokal: 2011–12, 2016–17
- DFL-Supercup: 2013, 2014
- UEFA Champions League runner-up: 2012–13

Germany

- UEFA European Under-19 Championship: 2008
- Olympic Silver Medal: 2016

Coach (assistant)
Germany

- UEFA European Under-17 Championship: 2023
- FIFA Under-17 World Cup: 2023

Borussia Dortmund

- UEFA Champions League runner-up: 2023–24

Individual

- Fritz Walter Medal U17 Bronze Medal 2006
- UEFA European Under-19 Football Championship Golden Player: 2008
