= Peter Gagelmann =

German football referee

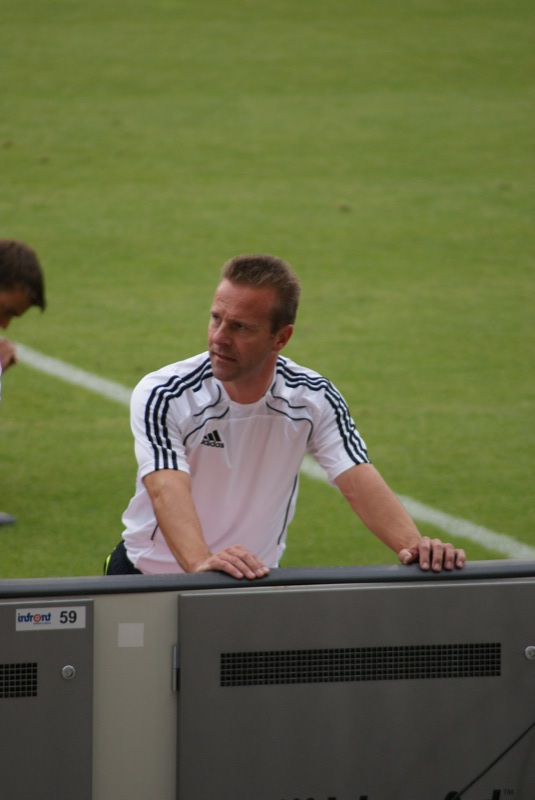
- Gagelmann in 2010
- Full name: Peter Gagelmann
- Born: 9 June 1968 (age 58)

Domestic
- Years: League
- 1999–2015: Bundesliga Referee
- 1998–2015: 2. Bundesliga Referee

Peter Gagelmann (born 9 June 1968) is a former German football referee from Bremen.

Gagelmann was a German Football Association referee for over 20 years, overseeing more than 200 Bundesliga matches during a 15-year period. He made his debut in the 2. Bundesliga in 1998, and oversaw his first Bundesliga match in 2000. Gagelmann retired from officiating in 2015 because he reached the age limit for German referees, which is 47.

Gagelmann was involved in controversy after a 2013–14 Bundesliga match between FC Augsburg and FC Bayern Munich where the Augsburg players and training staff claimed the referee insulted them.

Gagelmann now lives in Bremen and works as an employee at an event management company.
