= Mohamed Zidan =

Egyptian footballer (born 1981)

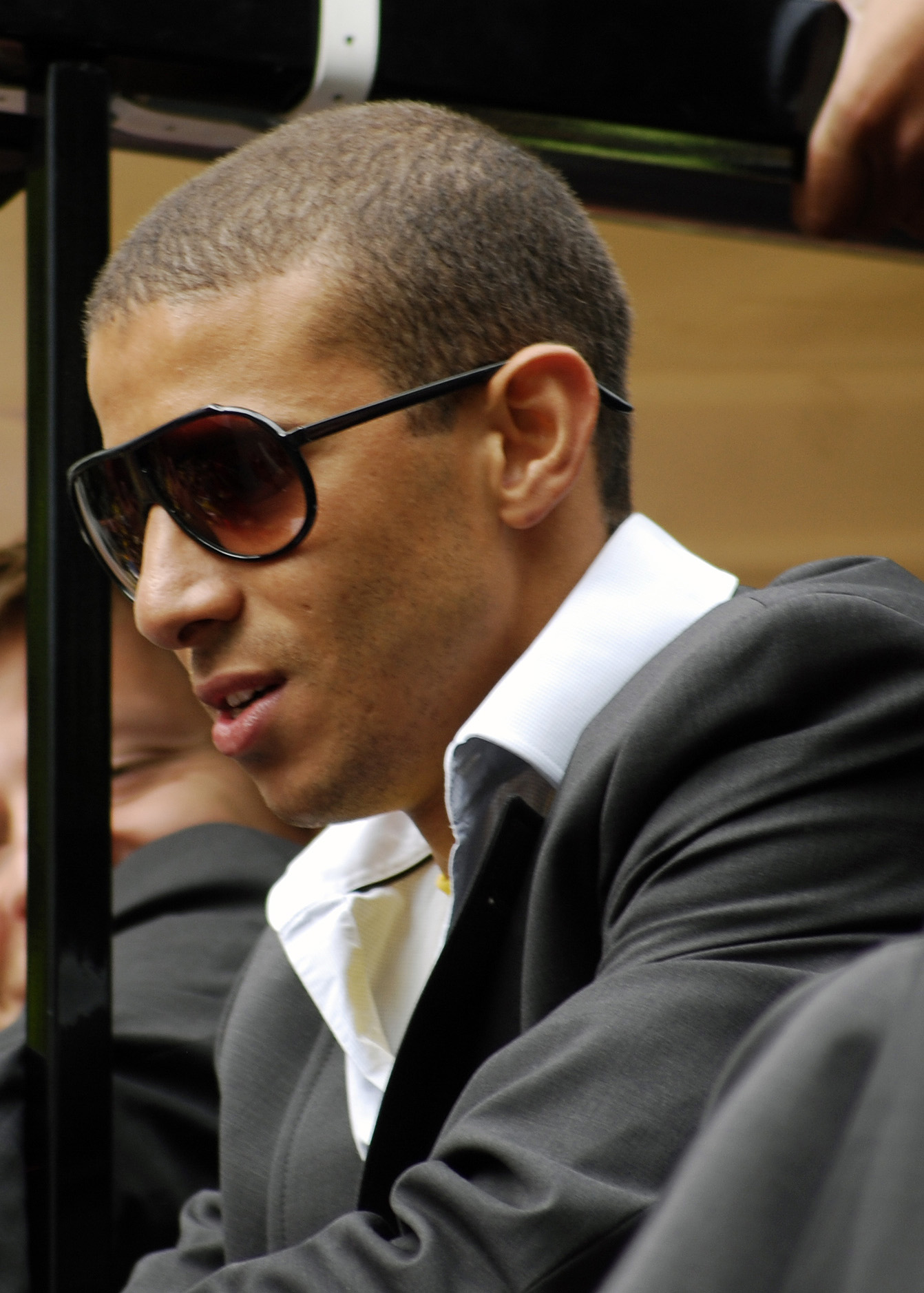
- Zidan celebrating Dortmund's Bundesliga win in 2011

Personal information
- Full name: Mohamed Abdallah Mohamed Zidan
- Date of birth: 11 December 1981 (age 44)
- Place of birth: Port Said, Egypt
- Height: 1.72 m (5 ft 8 in)
- Position: Striker

Youth career
- 1989–1999: Al Masry

Senior career*
Years	Team	Apps	(Gls)
1999–2003	AB	51	(12)
2003–2005	Midtjylland	47	(30)
2004–2005	→ Werder Bremen (loan)	10	(2)
2005–2007	Werder Bremen	5	(1)
2005–2006	→ Mainz 05 (loan)	26	(9)
2007	Mainz 05	15	(13)
2007–2008	Hamburger SV	21	(2)
2008–2012	Borussia Dortmund	66	(13)
2012	Mainz 05	12	(7)
2012–2013	Baniyas	9	(3)
2014–2015	El Entag El Harby	3	(0)
Total		244	(90)

International career
2005–2012	Egypt	41	(11)
Medal record
Men's football
Representing Egypt
Africa Cup of Nations
Winner	2008 Ghana
Winner	2010 Angola
- * Club domestic league appearances and goals

Mohamed Abdallah Mohamed Zidan (Arabic: محمد عبد الله محمد زيدان; born 11 December 1981) is an Egyptian former professional footballer who played as a striker.

== Club career ==
=== Early career ===
Mohamed Zidan was born in Port Said to an Egyptian family. His career started as a striker for his hometown club El Masry in 1998. Al-Masry dropped Zidan because of a perceived lack of passing ability, leading to his family moving to Denmark. In his first year in Denmark, while training with B93 for a contract, he played a few games for the Danish-Turkish club FC Anatolien, now Kokkedal BK, in Nivå in Northern Zealand. Zidan was scouted by the Danish Superliga club Akademisk Boldklub (AB) while he was juggling a ball at a Danish park in 1999. In June 2003, he moved to the league rivals FC Midtjylland (FCM), as AB experienced financial hardship. At FCM, he became the league's top scorer in the 2003–04 season, and won the Rookie of the year award, becoming Player of the Year the following season. In all, he scored 30 goals in 47 appearances for FC Midtjylland, and especially his nine goals in the first three games of FCM's newly built SAS Arena stadium, made the stadium colloquially known as "Zidan Arena".

=== Werder Bremen and Mainz 05 ===
Zidan's performance in the Danish League had resulted in interest among several top European clubs in signing the striker. In the winter break of the 2004–05 season, he was loaned by German club Werder Bremen for the remainder of the 2004–05, with an option to buy in the summer. In the summer of 2005 he was bought by Werder for a fee believed to be around €3.5 million. On 31 August 2005, Zidan was loaned out to Mainz for the 2005–06 season. He went on to score nine goals in 26 appearances, seven as a substitute for Mainz. In the 2006–07 pre-season friendly matches, he retained his form with Werder Bremen, starting six of the seven matches he had played and scored four goals. Zidan's performance in the semi-final match of the 2006 DFB-Ligapokal against Hamburger SV on 1 August 2006, including bagging a goal in the 50th minute, earned him the man of the match award and ensured his club's qualification to the cup final.

However, after a trail of injuries, Zidan was on the receiving end of less playing time. After months of speculations, following the limited playing time and injuries, Werder Bremen announced on 16 January 2007 that Zidan would be transferred to Mainz for a reported 2.8 million Euros fee, which made it the largest ever purchase in the club's history, passing his medical on 17 January 2007. He scored six goals in the first 5 matches with his new club, catapulting the team from last, to 10th place on 1 March 2007 with 27 points. The Egyptian talent also received 50% of votes by the Kicker magazine, and earned himself the title of "Player of the month" in February in Germany, while Mainz became "Team of the Month" in the German Bundesliga.

Fans of Mainz loved Zidan since his loan spell with the red shirt in which he managed to dazzle them with his skills, talent, and goals. The most notable show of talent was in a game against Bayern Munich during the 2005–06 season. Zidan earned a man of the match award when he dribbled past Philipp Lahm and scored against Oliver Kahn. Whilst loaned to Mainz, Zidan scored a goal against the club he was contracted to, Werder Bremen, in 14 seconds. This marked it as the fastest goal scored in the Bundesliga season and is ranked sixth among the fastest scored goals in the Bundesliga's history.

In an interview with Bild in Germany, Zidan admitted that he had high aspirations and had ambitions to play in either "Barcelona, Real Madrid, Liverpool or Manchester United". He stated that he wanted to play for Barcelona within the next three years to play alongside Brazilian sensation Ronaldinho or Liverpool to play with Steven Gerrard.

During the 2007 season Zidan contributed many spectacular goals, but could not save Mainz from relegation. The club had only been able to score 34 goals in the entire season, 13 of which, despite having played for less than half of a season, came from the Egyptian forward's feet. Unfortunately Zidan's hard-work and valuable solo contribution was insufficient to prevent Mainz from the depths of despair of being relegated to the second division. However, Zidan's work was noticed by number of top established clubs based in Spain, France and England as well as German champions VfB Stuttgart.

=== Hamburger SV ===
Zidan's run of good form during the 2006–07 season fueled many transfer rumors, and major clubs as Hamburger SV, newly crowned German champions VfB Stuttgart and several Spanish clubs were named as possible future clubs. Mainz manager Christian Heidel was very keen to keep Zidan at the club, so the club could mount a promotion challenge for the 2007–08 2. Bundesliga season.

On 3 June 2007, Zidan passed a medical and thereby completed his move to HSV. He said that he always wanted a move to the north-German club, because he still has many ties to Denmark. The transfer fee was suspected to be about €5.8 million.

Zidan was handed the number 7 shirt, a number previously worn by Hamburger SV prized player and Iranian captain, Mehdi Mahdavikia. Zidan proved himself as a capable striker and could adjust to the new team in friendly games, often scoring when substituted or scoring four goals when he played the full game. Mohamed Zidan scored his first official goal for Hamburger SV in the away DFB-Pokal match versus Holstein Kiel. However several appearances in Hamburg's start to the Bundesliga saw Zidan goalless, and often substituted off before the full 90 minutes of the game. Zidan however proved himself as a dangerous striker and playmaker, as he was brought on as a substitute against Bavarian giants Bayern Munich in the 74th minute. Zidan scored his first Bundesliga goal for HSV in the 87th minute, with the goal bearing a lot of significance as it ended Bayern's early undefeated run in the competition and was the first goal that Oliver Kahn had conceded up until then and was also the third goal that Zidan has scored against Bayern during his years in the Bundesliga.

He also scored Hamburg's only goal in the game against Real Madrid in the Emirates Cup which took place in the summer of 2008, and later only played one competitive game for Hamburg during the 2008–09 season, as a late substitute in the first round of the DFB-Pokal against FC Ingolstadt 04.

=== Borussia Dortmund ===
Eventually, his time at Hamburg turned out to be for a short period. On 17 August 2008, Zidan's transfer from Hamburg to Borussia Dortmund was confirmed by both clubs' official websites as part of a deal that also saw Croatian international Mladen Petrić moving in the opposite direction, with both players signing four-year contracts. Dortmund also confirmed they had received an officially undisclosed transfer fee, which were believed to be worth around 5 million euro. His transfer to Dortmund reunited him with former Mainz coach, Jürgen Klopp, who was in charge of the club during Zidan's two successful spells there in 2005–06 and the second half of the 2006–07 season. He received the number 10 shirt. His first appearance with Borussia Dortmund was on 23 August 2008 against Bayern Munich in a game which ended 1–1. On 17 April 2010, Zidan suffered an injury in his knee that prevented him from playing for almost 6 months. On 3 May 2011, Borussia Dormund were crowned champions of the Bundesliga for the first time since 2002.

=== Return to Mainz ===
On 31 January 2012, Zidan left Borussia Dortmund and signed a new contract with his former club Mainz. He scored once in each of his first six games for Mainz, becoming the first player in the history of the Bundesliga to score in each of his first six games with his new club. This surpassed VfB Stuttgart striker Fredi Bobic who had scored in the first five games for his new club in the 1994–1995 season opener. On 10 April 2012, he scored once and assisted two goals against Köln in a 4–0 win. At the end of the season, Zidan refused to sign a contract extension by rejecting a one-year offer, claiming that he wanted a two-year offer.

=== Baniyas ===
On 31 July 2012, Zidan signed for Emirati club Baniyas, signing a two-year contract. In January 2013 he was omitted from the Baniyas roster for the rest of the season and decided to have his contract terminated. He was not registered in the club's squad list for the next season, so he did not play a single match in the 2013–14 Season. He left the club after his contract expired. He later described his stay in UAE as the biggest mistake in his life.

== International career ==
Weeks before the 2006 Africa Cup of Nations in Egypt, the Egyptian Football Association sent a fax on 23 December 2005 to Mainz, asking for an international call-up for Zidan. There was no answer from Mainz or the player for that matter, and as a consequence he drew much criticism from the Egyptian fans and officials. He had allegedly chosen not to represent Egypt, as he felt he would lose his starting spot with Mainz. However, in an interview, after Egypt had won the African Cup of Nations in 2008, he stated that he did not play in 2006 was caused by a leg injury.

In a January 2006 interview with the Danish tabloid newspaper BT, Zidan criticized the Egyptian Football Association for contacting Mainz during Christmas time when everybody was on holiday, and said that the Egyptian national team should have talked to him personally, as they had with Tottenham Hotspur striker Mido. He also said that the Egyptian head coach Shehata had not treated him well, and that the whole thing seemed too unprofessional for him. In April 2006, Hassan Shehata declared he would never again invite Mohamed Zidan to join the national team. He stated, "Zidan refused to join the team when we needed him most, before the Nations Cup. You can never count on these kind of players". During this time there was also talk about Zidan wanting to play for the Denmark national team, if Egypt did not want him.

However, on 5 August 2006, just 11 days before Egypt's friendly match against Uruguay, Shehata backed down from his decision by calling up Zidan for the national team. However, Zidan remained doubtful for the friendly match against Uruguay due to an injury that forced him to miss Werder Bremen's season opener. Zidan was called to represent Egypt in the 2008 Africa Cup of Nations qualification match against Burundi, where he scored his first international goal only five minutes after kick-off.

In Egypt's 2008 Africa Cup of Nations opening Group C match against Cameroon, in a match hotly billed as the Group C decider for top and second spots in the group, Zidan turned in a strong performance, scoring two goals – helping the African Champions' cause for defending their title during an impressive 4–2 victory.

Zidan was not out of the woods yet when it comes to controversy as he was reportedly injured in training with the national team before their match with Angola, ART reporter said that he thought that Zidan is being "spoilt", and that he refused to continue the warm up and treatment for him before the game, this was denied by Shawky Gharib the Egyptian Head Coach, Zidan and the Manager; Hassan Shehata.

After missing a few games and a few starts after the display in the opening Cameroon game, Zidan was used as a substitute on numerous occasions, always posing a great threat to the opposition. He was used in the 2008 Africa Cup of Nations in Ghana as a striker, sometimes a lone striker, a winger and as an offensive midfielder. One of the most notable plays was in the final against Cameroon, when he applied pressure on veteran defender Rigobert Song and effectively wrestled the ball out of the defender's legs and managed to supply Mohamed Aboutrika for the winning goal.

In Egypt's opening 2009 FIFA Confederations Cup game, Zidan scored two goals against Brazil in a 4–3 loss.

He was called up to rejoin Egypt national team for the 2010 Africa Cup of Nations in Angola. He was Egypt's striker along with Emad Moteab. He played in the opening Group C match against Nigeria. He scored his a goal against Algeria in the semifinal, in a match that ended 4–0 to Egypt, and where he also assisted Mohamed Abdel-Shafy for the 3–0 goal. He supplied the final's winning goal, once again, but not to Aboutrika this time; this time it was Mohamed Nagy Gedo who got the winning goal.

On 3 March 2010, Zidan scored the only goal for Egypt in a 3–1 loss to England. Zidan is unlikely to play for Egypt again after refusing to play a crucial qualifiers match against Central African Republic to fly off to China for a discussion with a Chinese club.

== Personal life ==
Zidan also holds German citizenship.

He was married to his long-time girlfriend Stina, who holds Danish citizenship, in 2014 in Germany. They have two children together, born in 2009 and 2014.

In 2015, Zidan moved back to Cairo. In 2017, he married his current wife, Menas. They have a son born in 2018.

== Career as an analyst ==
In 2014, Zidane worked as an analyst at beIN SPORTS channel for matches involving German clubs.

== Career statistics ==
=== Club ===
Appearances and goals by club, season and competition
Club	Season	League			National cup (Note: Includes Danish Cup, DFB-Pokal, UAE President's Cup)		Continental		Other		Total	
Club	Season	Division	Apps	Goals	Apps	Goals	Apps	Goals	Apps	Goals	Apps	Goals
AB	2000–01	Danish Superliga	5	0	—		—		—		5	0
AB	2001–02	Danish Superliga	17	1	—		—		—		17	1
AB	2002–03	Danish Superliga	29	11	—		—		—		29	11
AB	Total		51	12	—		—		—		51	12
Midtjylland	2003–04	Danish Superliga	30	19	1	0	—		—		31	19
Midtjylland	2004–05	Danish Superliga	17	11	2	3	—		—		19	14
Midtjylland	Total		47	30	3	3	—		—		50	33
Werder Bremen (loan)	2004–05	Bundesliga	10	2	—		—		—		10	2
Mainz 05 (loan)	2005–06	Bundesliga	26	9	3	1	1	0	—		30	10
Werder Bremen	2006–07	Bundesliga	5	1	2	1	1	0	—		8	2
Mainz 05	2006–07	Bundesliga	15	13	—		—		—		15	13
Hamburger SV	2007–08	Bundesliga	21	2	3	1	9	1	—		33	4
Hamburger SV	2008–09	Bundesliga	—		1	0	—		—		1	0
Hamburger SV	Total		21	2	4	1	9	1	—		34	4
Borussia Dortmund	2008–09	Bundesliga	29	7	1	0	1	0	—		31	7
Borussia Dortmund	2009–10	Bundesliga	27	6	3	2	—		—		30	8
Borussia Dortmund	2010–11	Bundesliga	8	0	—		1	0	—		9	0
Borussia Dortmund	2011–12	Bundesliga	2	0	—		1	0	—		3	0
Borussia Dortmund	Total		66	13	4	2	3	0	—		73	15
Mainz 05	2011–12	Bundesliga	12	7	—		—		—		12	7
Baniyas	2012–13	UAE Pro League	9	3	2	1	—		—		11	4
El Entag El Harby	2015–16	Egyptian Premier League	3	0	—		—		—		3	0
Career total			265	92	18	9	14	1	—		297	102

=== International ===
Appearances and goals by national team and year
National team	Year	Apps	Goals
Egypt	2005	3	0
Egypt	2006	2	1
Egypt	2007	4	1
Egypt	2008	8	2
Egypt	2009	9	2
Egypt	2010	9	3
Egypt	2011	3	0
Egypt	2012	3	2
Total		41	11

Scores and results list Egypt's goal tally first, score column indicates score after each Zidan goal.

List of international goals scored by Mohamed Zidan
No.	Date	Venue	Opponent	Score	Result	Competition
1	2 September 2006	Cairo International Stadium, Cairo, Egypt	Burundi	1–0	4–1	2008 Africa Cup of Nations qualification
2	25 March 2007	Cairo International Stadium, Cairo, Egypt	Mauritania	1–0	3–0	2008 Africa Cup of Nations qualification
3	22 January 2008	Baba Yara Stadium, Kumasi, Ghana	Cameroon	2–0	4–2	2008 Africa Cup of Nations
4	22 January 2008	Baba Yara Stadium, Kumasi, Ghana	Cameroon	3–0	4–2	2008 Africa Cup of Nations
5	15 June 2009	Free State Stadium, Bloemfontein, South Africa	Brazil	1–1	3–4	2009 FIFA Confederations Cup
6	15 June 2009	Free State Stadium, Bloemfontein, South Africa	Brazil	3–3	3–4	2009 FIFA Confederations Cup
7	28 January 2010	Estádio Nacional de Ombaka, Benguela, Angola	Algeria	2–0	4–0	2010 Africa Cup of Nations
8	3 March 2010	Wembley Stadium, London, England	England	1–0	1–3	Friendly
9	17 November 2010	Cairo International Stadium, Cairo, Egypt	Australia	3–0	3–0	Friendly
10	1 June 2012	Borg El Arab Stadium, Alexandria, Egypt	Mozambique	2–0	2–0	2014 FIFA World Cup qualification
11	15 June 2012	Borg El Arab Stadium, Alexandria, Egypt	Central African Republic	1–0	2–3	2013 Africa Cup of Nations qualification

== Honours ==
Werder Bremen

- DFL-Ligapokal: 2006

Hamburger SV

- UEFA Intertoto Cup: 2007

Borussia Dortmund

- Bundesliga: 2010–11, 2011–12

Egypt

- Africa Cup of Nations: 2008, 2010

Individual

- Danish Superliga top scorer: 2003–04 (shared)
- FC Midtjylland Player of the Year: 2003–04, 2004–05
- Africa Cup of Nations Best XI: 2010
