= Knut Kircher =

German football referee

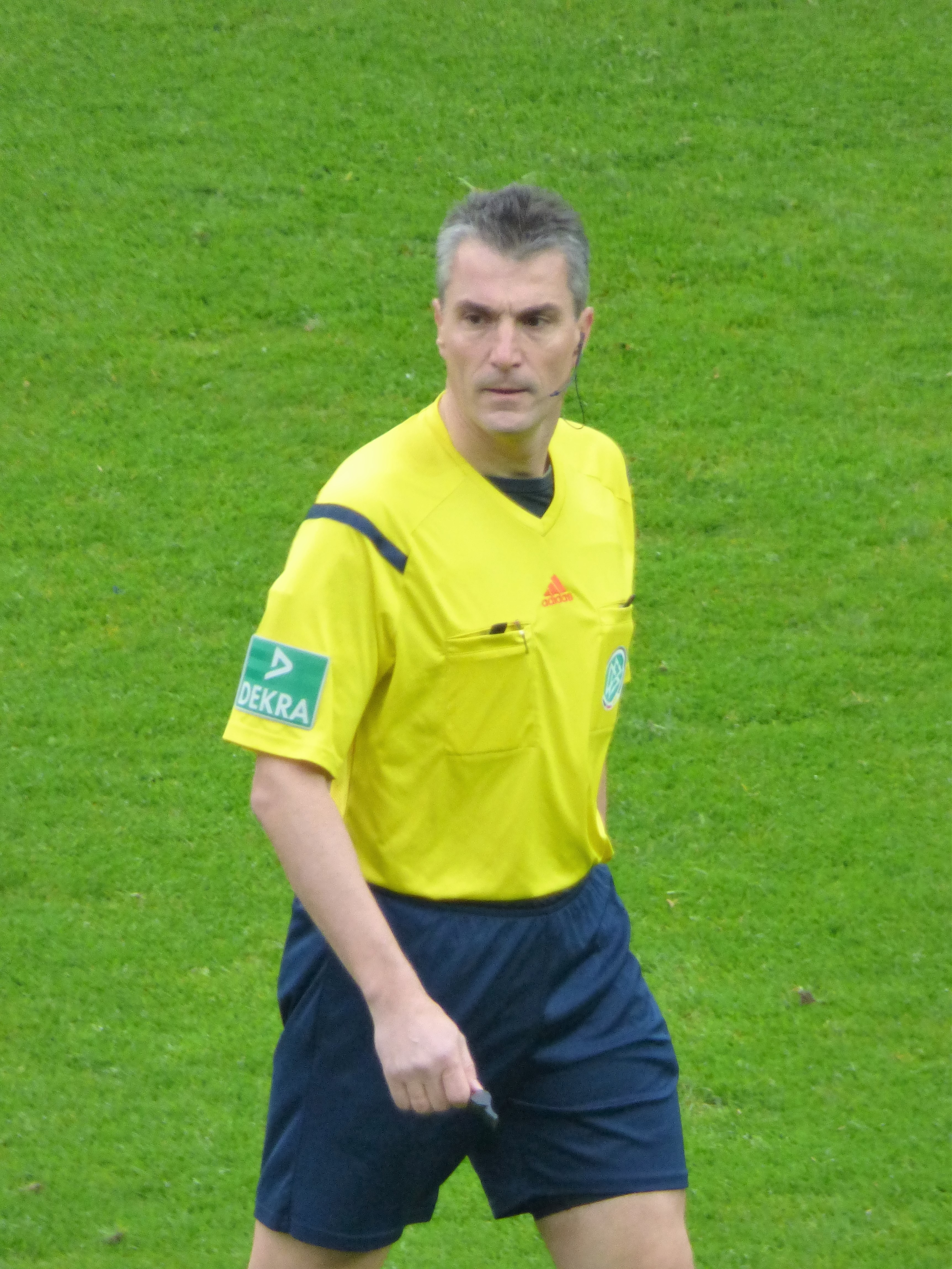
- Kircher in 2016
- Born: 2 February 1969 (age 57); Hirschau, West Germany
- Other occupation: Mechanical engineer

Domestic
Years	League	Role
1997–2016	DFB	Referee
1998–2016	2. Bundesliga	Referee
2002–2016	Bundesliga	Referee

International
Years	League	Role
2004–2012	FIFA listed	Referee

Knut Kircher (born 2 February 1969) is a former German football referee who is based in Rottenburg am Neckar. He refereed for TSV Hirschau of the Württemberg Football Association.

== Refereeing career ==
In 1998, he became a referee in the 2. Bundesliga. Kircher was then promoted to referee in the German Bundesliga for the 2001–02 season. In 2004, he became a FIFA referee. He officiated his first match on 8 September 2004; the World Cup qualifying match between Andorra and Romania (1–5).

Kircher retired from officiating in 2016 because he reached the age limit for German referees, which is 47. His final Bundesliga match officiated was between Bayern Munich and Hannover 96.

== Personal life ==
Kircher studied at and graduated from the University Albstadt-Sigmaringen engineering department. He lives in Rottenburg, and is married with three children. His main job is working at Daimler AG, where he lectures.
