= Marc Hornschuh =

German footballer

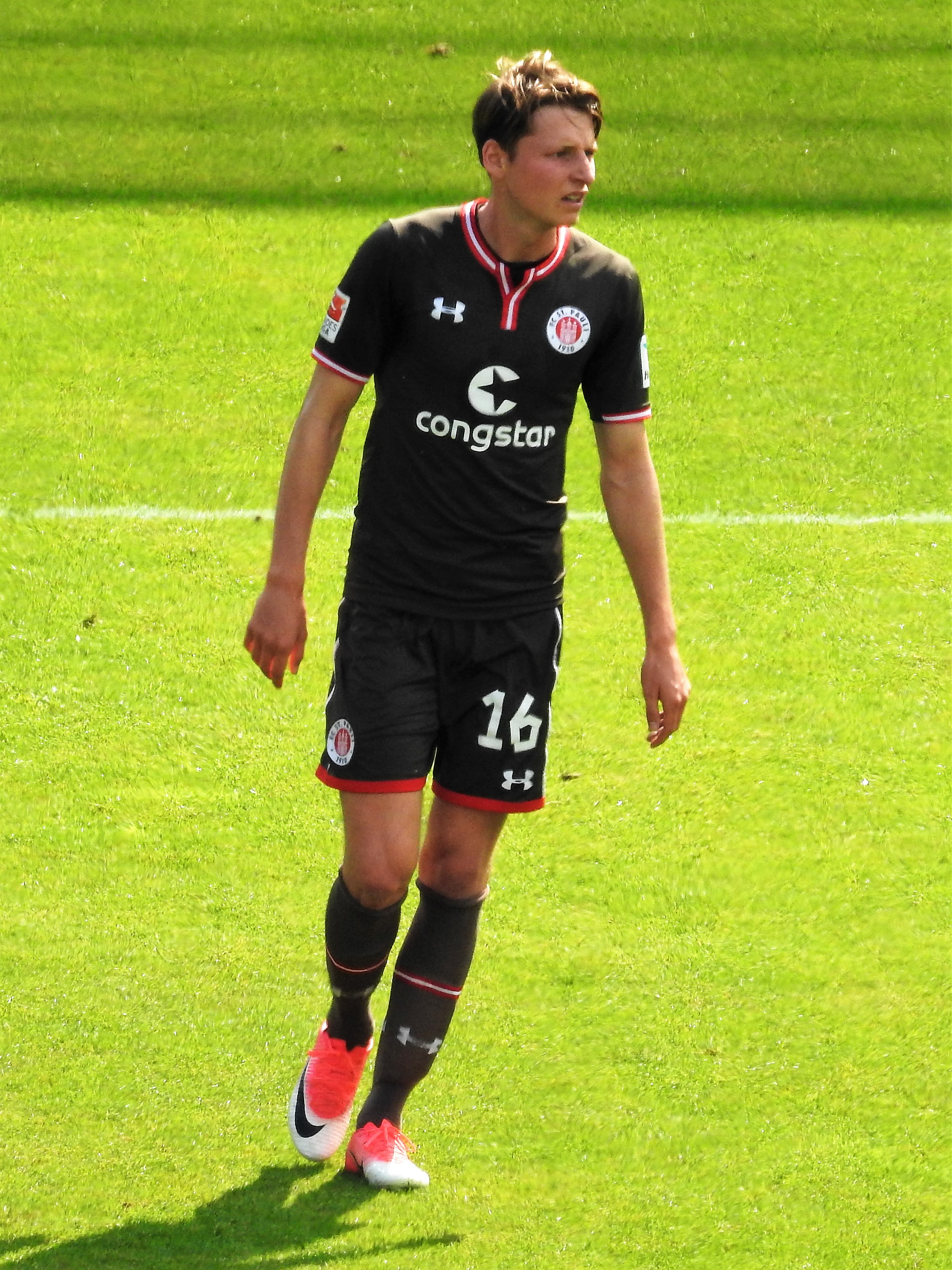
- Hornschuh playing for FC St. Pauli in 2017

Personal information
- Date of birth: 2 March 1991 (age 35)
- Place of birth: Dortmund, Germany
- Height: 1.87 m (6 ft 2 in)
- Position: Centre back

Team information
- Current team: SC Freiburg II
- Number: 23

Youth career
- 1994–2002: DJK TuS Körne
- 2002–2009: Borussia Dortmund

Senior career*
Years	Team	Apps	(Gls)
2009–2015	Borussia Dortmund II	141	(5)
2012	→ Ingolstadt 04 (loan)	2	(0)
2012	→ Ingolstadt 04 II (loan)	1	(0)
2015–2020	FC St. Pauli	57	(2)
2020–2021	Hamburger SV II	10	(0)
2021–2024	FC Zürich	55	(1)
2024–	SC Freiburg II	26	(0)

International career
2008–2009	Germany U18	11	(0)
2009–2010	Germany U19	12	(0)
2010–2012	Germany U21	11	(0)
- * Club domestic league appearances and goals as of 8 March 2026

Marc Hornschuh (born 2 March 1991) is a German professional footballer who plays as a centre back for SC Freiburg II in the Regionalliga Südwest.

== Career ==
On 23 March 2015, Borussia Dortmund II captain Hornschuh agreed to join second-tier FSV Frankfurt on a free transfer at the end of the season, after 15 years with Borussia Dortmund, signing a two-year contract until 30 June 2017.

On 31 August 2015, Hornschuh signed a one-year contract with FC St. Pauli. In March 2016 he chose to extend his contract until 2020. In his time with the club, he struggled with injuries.
