= 2011–12 DFB-Pokal =

Tournament details
- Country: Germany
- Teams: 64

Final positions
- Champions: Borussia Dortmund
- Runners-up: Bayern Munich

Tournament statistics
- Matches played: 63
- Goals scored: 224 (3.56 per match)
- Top goal scorer(s): Robert Lewandowski (7 goals)

The 2011–12 DFB-Pokal was the 69th season of the annual German football cup competition. It commenced on 29 July 2011 with the first of six rounds and concluded on 12 May 2012 with the final at the Olympiastadion in Berlin.

Since both finalists have qualified for the UEFA Champions League, the 2012–13 UEFA Europa League (group stage) spot was given to the fifth-placed Bundesliga team. Schalke 04 were the reigning holders, but they were beaten by Borussia Mönchengladbach in the round of 16.

== Participating clubs ==
The following 64 teams competed in the first round:

Bundesliga the 18 clubs of the 2010–11 season	2. Bundesliga; the 18 clubs of the 2010–11 season	3. Liga; the top 4 clubs of the 2010–11 season
SV Werder Bremen; Borussia Dortmund; Eintracht Frankfurt; SC Freiburg; Hamburger SV; Hannover 96; TSG 1899 Hoffenheim; 1. FC Kaiserslautern; 1. FC Köln; Bayer 04 Leverkusen; 1. FSV Mainz 05; Borussia Mönchengladbach; FC Bayern Munich; 1. FC Nürnberg; FC Schalke 04; VfB Stuttgart; FC St. Pauli; VfL Wolfsburg	Alemannia Aachen; FC Erzgebirge Aue; FC Augsburg; 1. FC Union Berlin; Arminia Bielefeld; VfL Bochum; FC Energie Cottbus; MSV Duisburg; Fortuna Düsseldorf; FSV Frankfurt; SpVgg Greuther Fürth; Hertha BSC; FC Ingolstadt 04; Karlsruher SC; TSV 1860 Munich; Rot-Weiß Oberhausen; VfL Osnabrück; SC Paderborn 07	Eintracht Braunschweig; Dynamo Dresden; F.C. Hansa Rostock; SV Wehen Wiesbaden
Winners of 21 regional cup competitions
Baden SV Sandhausen; Bavaria (Note: The three regions with the most participating teams in their league competitions (Bavaria, Lower Saxony, Westphalia) are allowed to enter two teams for the competition.) SSV Jahn Regensburg (CW) SpVgg Unterhaching (Note: Bavarian Cup runners-up SV Wacker Burghausen had to compete in a play-off against SpVgg Unterhaching, the winners of the match between the losing semi-finalists, for the second Bavarian spot; this play-off was won by Unterhaching.); Berlin BFC Dynamo; Brandenburg SV Babelsberg 03; Bremen FC Oberneuland; Hamburg Eimsbütteler TV; Hesse KSV Hessen Kassel (Note: Since SV Wehen Wiesbaden will enter the competition via their league placement, runners-up Hessen Kassel will inherit the spot reserved for the cup winners.)	Lower Rhine Rot-Weiss Essen; Lower Saxony Kickers Emden VfB Oldenburg (Note: Since Eintracht Braunschweig will enter the competition via their league placement, VfB Oldenburg and TSV Ottersberg as losing semi-finalists played a single match to determine the second Lower Saxony participant. This match was won by Oldenburg.); Mecklenburg-Vorpommern FC Anker Wismar (Note: Since F.C. Hansa Rostock will enter the competition via their league placement, runners-up Anker Wismar will inherit the spot reserved for the cup winners.); Middle Rhine Germania Windeck; Rhineland Eintracht Trier; Saarland; 1. FC Saarbrücken; Saxony RB Leipzig	Saxony-Anhalt Hallescher FC; Schleswig-Holstein Holstein Kiel; South Baden FC Teningen; Southwest SVN Zweibrücken; Thuringia ZFC Meuselwitz; Westphalia SC Wiedenbrück 2000 (CW) Rot Weiss Ahlen; Württemberg; 1. FC Heidenheim 1846

== Schedule ==
The rounds of the 2011–12 competition are scheduled as follows:

Round	Draw date	Matches
First round	11 June 2011	29 July–1 August 2011
Second round	6 August 2011	25–26 October 2011
Round of 16		20–21 December 2011
Quarter-finals		7–8 February 2012
Semi-finals		20–21 March 2012
Final		12 May 2012 at Olympiastadion, Berlin

== Draw ==
The draws for the different rounds are conducted as following: For the first round, the participating teams will be split into two pots. The first pot contains all teams which have qualified through their regional cup competitions, the best four teams of the 3rd Liga and the bottom four teams of the Second Bundesliga. Every team from this pot will be drawn to a team from the second pot, which contains all remaining professional teams. The teams from the first pot will be set as the home team in the process.

The two-pot scenario will also be applied for the second round, with the remaining 3rd Liga/amateur teams in the first pot and the remaining professional teams in the other pot. Once one pot is empty, the remaining pairings will be drawn from the other pot with the first-drawn team for a match serving as hosts. For the remaining rounds, the draw will be conducted from just one pot. Any remaining 3rd Liga/amateur team will be the home team if drawn against a professional team. In every other case, the first-drawn team will serve as hosts.

== Matches ==
=== First round ===
The draw was made on 11 June 2011.

As in the 2010–11 competition, Hallescher FC will have to move their first-round match against Eintracht Frankfurt to another ground because re-building of their own Kurt-Wabbel-Stadion has not yet been completed. After several attempts of moving the tie to other locations, including Paul Greifzu Stadium at nearby Dessau-Roßlau and Frankenstadion at Nuremberg, were unsuccessful because of security concerns, the match will eventually be played at cross-town Stadion am Bildungszentrum, the current home ground of the club. Anker Wismar will also have to move their tie against Hannover 96 from their own Paul-Bürger-Stadion because of security requirements. The match will be played at Lohmühle, Lübeck. Other matches have been moved for capacity reasons, including FC Teningen–FC Schalke 04 (to be played at Badenova-Stadion in nearby Freiburg), SC Wiedenbrück 2000–1. FC Köln (to be played at Heidewaldstadion, Gütersloh), SVN Zweibrücken–1. FSV Mainz 05 (to be played at Waldstadion, Homburg) and Germania Windeck–1899 Hoffenheim (Sportpark Höhenberg, Cologne). Headlines made Hamburg Cup winner Eimsbütteler TV, who lost almost its complete first and second teams because of disagreements over how to split the money earned from reaching the first round. ETV was forced to field a side predominantly made up of players from its under-19 side.

All times CEST

29 July 2011	Rot-Weiss Essen	2–2 (a.e.t.) (4–3 p)	1. FC Union Berlin	Essen
20:30	Brauer 22'; Koep 71'	Report (in German)	82' Zoundi; 90+1' Terodde	Stadium: Georg-Melches-Stadion; Attendance: 15,000; Referee: Robert Kempter (Sauldorf)
	Penalties
	Jasmund (penalty scored); Rodenberg (penalty missed); Brauer (penalty scored); Heppke (penalty scored); Wagner (penalty scored)		(penalty missed) Terodde; (penalty scored) Menz; (penalty missed) Ede; (penalty scored) Silvio; (penalty scored) Karl

29 July 2011	RB Leipzig	3–2	VfL Wolfsburg	Leipzig
20:30	Frahn 6', 17', 45'	Report (in German)	25' Lakić; 28' Salihamidžić	Stadium: Red Bull Arena; Attendance: 31,212; Referee: Markus Wingenbach (Diez)

29 July 2011	1. FC Saarbrücken	1–3 (a.e.t.)	Erzgebirge Aue	Saarbrücken
20:30	Lerandy 79'	Report (in German)	35' (pen.) Paulus; 100' Hochscheidt; 119' Könnecke	Stadium: Ludwigspark; Attendance: 7,136; Referee: Frank Willenborg (Osnabrück)

29 July 2011	Jahn Regensburg	1–3	Borussia Mönchengladbach	Regensburg
20:30	Schweinsteiger 31' (pen.)	Report (in German)	14' Stranzl; 22' Reus; 70' De Camargo	Stadium: Jahnstadion; Attendance: 10,388; Referee: Tobias Welz (Wiesbaden)

29 July 2011	Wehen Wiesbaden	1–2	VfB Stuttgart	Wiesbaden
20:30	Janjić 28' (pen.)	Report (in German)	6' Bičakčić; 50' Kuzmanović	Stadium: BRITA-Arena; Attendance: 11,600; Referee: Robert Hartmann (Wangen im Allgäu)

29 July 2011	VfL Osnabrück	2–3 (a.e.t.)	1860 Munich	Osnabrück
20:30	Wegkamp 1'; Mauersberger 34'	Report (in German)	11' (pen.), 107' Lauth; 47' Volland	Stadium: Stadion an der Bremer Brücke; Attendance: 11,000; Referee: Florian Steuer (Menden)

30 July 2011	BFC Dynamo	0–3	1. FC Kaiserslautern	Berlin
15:30		Report (in German)	18' Iličević; 22' Tiffert; 50' Petsos	Stadium: Friedrich-Ludwig-Jahn-Sportpark; Attendance: 10,104; Referee: Babak Rafati

30 July 2011	Hallescher FC	0–2	Eintracht Frankfurt	Halle
15:30		Report (in German)	85' (pen.), 90' Gekas	Stadium: Stadion am Bildungszentrum; Attendance: 2,800; Referee: Daniel Siebert

30 July 2011	1. FC Heidenheim 1846	2–1	Werder Bremen	Heidenheim an der Brenz
15:30	Sauter 57'; Schnatterer 59'	Report (in German)	33' Rosenberg	Stadium: Voith-Arena; Attendance: 10,000; Referee: Jochen Drees

30 July 2011	Dynamo Dresden	4–3 (a.e.t.)	Bayer Leverkusen	Dresden
15:30	Schuppan 68'; Koch 70', 86'; Schnetzler 117'	Report (in German)	6' Derdiyok; 12' Sam; 49' Schürrle	Stadium: Glücksgas Arena; Attendance: 24,500; Referee: Günter Perl

30 July 2011	Eintracht Trier	2–1	FC St. Pauli	Trier
15:30	Kulabas 16'; Hauswald 89'	Report (in German)	88' Sağlık	Stadium: Moselstadion; Attendance: 8,457; Referee: Bibiana Steinhaus

30 July 2011	Arminia Bielefeld	1–5	1. FC Nürnberg	Bielefeld
15:30	Jerat 15'	Report (in German)	26', 35', 40' Feulner; 65' Mak; 71' Pekhart	Stadium: Bielefelder Alm; Attendance: 12,000; Referee: Norbert Grudzinski

30 July 2011	Rot Weiss Ahlen	0–10	SC Paderborn	Ahlen
15:30		Report (in German)	12', 29' Alushi; 23' (pen.) Krösche; 30', 71', 83' Taylor; 79' Kara; 84' Meha; 86' Proschwitz	Stadium: Wersestadion; Attendance: 3,002; Referee: Christian Bandurski

30 July 2011	SV Babelsberg 03	0–2	MSV Duisburg	Potsdam
15:30		Report (in German)	6' (o.g.) Stroh-Engel; 30' Domovchiyski	Stadium: Karl-Liebknecht-Stadion; Attendance: 3,256; Referee: Martin Petersen

30 July 2011	VfB Oldenburg	1–2	Hamburger SV	Oldenburg
15:30	Ferrulli 34'	Report (in German)	26' Westermann; 72' Petrić	Stadium: Marschweg-Stadion; Attendance: 15,552; Referee: Peter Gagelmann

30 July 2011	Holstein Kiel	3–0	Energie Cottbus	Kiel
19:30	Sykora 15'; Kazior 32'; Herrmann 59'	Report (in German)		Stadium: Holstein-Stadion; Attendance: 7,219; Referee: Robert Kampka

30 July 2011	SV Sandhausen	0–3	Borussia Dortmund	Sandhausen
19:30		Report (in German)	10', 90' Lewandowski; 56' Kagawa	Stadium: Hardtwald; Attendance: 10,231; Referee: Tobias Christ

30 July 2011	Kickers Emden	1–5 (a.e.t.)	FSV Frankfurt	Emden
19:30	Janßen 45' (pen.)	Report (in German)	35' Yelen; 93', 112' Gueye; 111', 118' Benyamina	Stadium: Embdena-Stadion; Attendance: 3,000; Referee: Marcel Unger

30 July 2011	Hansa Rostock	2–2 (a.e.t.) (3–5 p)	VfL Bochum	Rostock
19:30	Jänicke 36'; Košťál 55'	Report (in German)	52' Aydın; 72' Ginczek	Stadium: DKB-Arena; Attendance: 12,700; Referee: Markus Schmidt
	Penalties
	Wiemann (penalty missed); Langen (penalty scored); Lartey (penalty scored); Ziegenbein (penalty scored)		(penalty scored) Kefkir; (penalty scored) Aydın; (penalty scored) Freier; (penalty scored) Federico; (penalty scored) Maltritz

30 July 2011	Rot-Weiß Oberhausen	1–2 (a.e.t.)	FC Augsburg	Oberhausen
19:30	Kullmann 24'	Report (in German)	33' Verhaegh; 120' De Roeck	Stadium: Niederrheinstadion; Attendance: 3,786; Referee: Marco Fritz

31 July 2011	FC Oberneuland	1–4	FC Ingolstadt	Bremen
14:30	G. Aktas 35'	Report (in German)	10', 71' Hartmann; 19' (pen.) Leitl; 87' Ikeng	Stadium: Stadion Vinnenweg; Attendance: 750; Referee: Patrick Ittrich

31 July 2011	SpVgg Unterhaching	3–2	SC Freiburg	Unterhaching
14:30	Sternisko 17'; Tunjić 47' (pen.), 87' (pen.)	Report (in German)	9' Makiadi; 74' Reisinger	Stadium: Generali Sportpark; Attendance: 5,000; Referee: Guido Winkmann

31 July 2011	Karlsruher SC	3–1	Alemannia Aachen	Karlsruhe
14:30	Milchraum 26'; Kempe 83'; Krebs 90+4'	Report (in German)	7' (pen.) Kratz	Stadium: Wildparkstadion; Attendance: 15,118; Referee: Deniz Aytekin

31 July 2011	Eimsbütteler TV	0–10	Greuther Fürth	Hamburg
14:30		Report (in German)	17' Mavraj; 19', 25', 76', 85' Sararer; 54', 71' Tyrała; 66' (pen.) Nehrig; 80' Nöthe; 88' C. Rahn	Stadium: Stadion Hoheluft; Attendance: 2,000; Referee: Thomas Metzen

31 July 2011	Anker Wismar	0–6	Hannover 96	Lübeck
14:30		Report (in German)	12', 25' Abdellaoue; 34', 36' Stindl; 71', 76' Stoppelkamp	Stadium: Lohmühle; Attendance: 7,000; Referee: Peter Sippel

31 July 2011	ZFC Meuselwitz	0–4	Hertha BSC	Meuselwitz
16:00		Report (in German)	22', 26' Ramos; 49' Ottl; 56' Ebert	Stadium: bluechip-Arena; Attendance: 7,707; Referee: Thorsten Schriever

31 July 2011	Germania Windeck	1–3 (a.e.t.)	1899 Hoffenheim	Cologne
16:00	Buchholz 36'	Report (in German)	51' (pen.) Salihović; Johnson 98'; Babel 116'	Stadium: Sportpark Höhenberg; Attendance: 3,500; Referee: Bastian Dankert

31 July 2011	FC Teningen	1–11	Schalke 04	Freiburg
17:30	Kirstein 20'	Report (in German)	3', 22', 39', 64' Huntelaar; 7' Papadopoulos; 13', 32' Raúl; 57', 75' Holtby; 70', 79' Gavranović	Stadium: Badenova-Stadion; Attendance: 21,000; Referee: Tobias Stieler

31 July 2011	Hessen Kassel	0–3	Fortuna Düsseldorf	Kassel
17:30		Report (in German)	25' Bröker; 80' Rösler; 86' O. Fink	Stadium: Auestadion; Attendance: 14,850; Referee: Benjamin Cortus

31 July 2011	SVN Zweibrücken	1–2 (a.e.t.)	Mainz 05	Homburg
17:30	Maul 116'	Report (in German)	95' Slišković; 115' Allagui	Stadium: Waldstadion; Attendance: 12,000; Referee: Harm Osmers

31 July 2011	SC Wiedenbrück 2000	0–3	1. FC Köln	Gütersloh
17:30		Report (in German)	23', 45' Novaković; 78' Jajalo	Stadium: Heidewaldstadion; Attendance: 12,200; Referee: Christian Leicher

1 August 2011	Eintracht Braunschweig	0–3	Bayern Munich	Braunschweig
20:30		Report (in German)	9' (pen.) Gómez; 39' (pen.) Schweinsteiger; 83' Müller	Stadium: Eintracht-Stadion; Attendance: 23,645; Referee: Felix Zwayer

=== Second round ===
The draw for this round took place on 6 August 2011. The matches were played on 25–26 October 2011.

25 October 2011	RB Leipzig	0–1	FC Augsburg	Leipzig
19:00		Report	62' Brinkmann	Stadium: Red Bull Arena; Attendance: 34,341; Referee: Florian Meyer

25 October 2011	SpVgg Unterhaching	1–4	VfL Bochum	Unterhaching
19:00	Bigalke 69' (pen.)	Report	7' Dabrowski; 22' Ginczek; 75' Federico; 78' Jong Tae-se	Stadium: Generali Sportpark; Attendance: 3,150; Referee: Martin Petersen

25 October 2011	1. FC Heidenheim 1846	0–0 (a.e.t.) (3–4 p)	Borussia Mönchengladbach	Heidenheim an der Brenz
19:00		Report		Stadium: Voith-Arena; Attendance: 10,000; Referee: Markus Wingenbach
	Penalties
	Sauter (penalty scored); Krebs (penalty scored); Spann (penalty missed); Schittenhelm (penalty scored); Tausendpfund (penalty missed)		(penalty scored) Daems; (penalty scored) Dante; (penalty scored) Nordtveit; (penalty scored) Stranzl

25 October 2011	Fortuna Düsseldorf	3–0	1860 Munich	Düsseldorf
19:00	Benjamin 15'; Rösler 39', 90+1'	Report		Stadium: Esprit Arena; Attendance: 34,413; Referee: Jochen Drees

25 October 2011	Eintracht Trier	1–2 (a.e.t.)	Hamburger SV	Trier
20:30	Kulabas 9'	Report	63' Berg; 110' Aogo	Stadium: Moselstadion; Attendance: 10,300; Referee: Robert Hartmann

25 October 2011	Greuther Fürth	4–0	SC Paderborn	Fürth
20:30	Peković 5'; Nöthe 29'; Occéan 35'; Pektürk 79'	Report		Stadium: Trolli Arena; Attendance: 6,150; Referee: Markus Schmidt

25 October 2011	1899 Hoffenheim	2–1	1. FC Köln	Sinsheim
20:30	Obasi 40'; Musona 50'	Report	6' Jajalo	Stadium: Rhein-Neckar-Arena; Attendance: 16,000; Referee: Knut Kircher

25 October 2011	Borussia Dortmund	2–0	Dynamo Dresden	Dortmund
20:45	Lewandowski 30'; Götze 65'	Report		Stadium: Signal Iduna Park; Attendance: 73,100; Referee: Peter Gagelmann

26 October 2011	Holstein Kiel	2–0	MSV Duisburg	Kiel
19:00	Kazior 54'; Sykora 58'	Report		Stadium: Holstein-Stadion; Attendance: 8,981; Referee: Christian Fischer

26 October 2011	Rot-Weiss Essen	0–3	Hertha BSC	Essen
19:00		Report	64' Ramos; 72' Lasogga; 86' Rukavytsya	Stadium: Georg-Melches-Stadion; Attendance: 14,000; Referee: Deniz Aytekin

26 October 2011	Hannover 96	0–1 (a.e.t.)	Mainz 05	Hanover
19:00		Report	93' Ivanschitz	Stadium: AWD-Arena; Attendance: 30,100; Referee: Felix Brych

26 October 2011	Karlsruher SC	0–2	Schalke 04	Karlsruhe
19:00		Report	81' Huntelaar; 83' Matip	Stadium: Wildparkstadion; Attendance: 28,916; Referee: Günter Perl

26 October 2011	Erzgebirge Aue	1–2	1. FC Nürnberg	Aue
20:30	König 78'	Report	64' Esswein; 68' Wießmeier	Stadium: Erzgebirgsstadion; Attendance: 13,000; Referee: Thorsten Kinhöfer

26 October 2011	Bayern Munich	6–0	FC Ingolstadt	Munich
20:30	Müller 33'; Alaba 49'; Petersen 52', 71'; Matip 82' (o.g.); Usami 90'	Report		Stadium: Allianz Arena; Attendance: 63,000; Referee: Guido Winkmann

26 October 2011	VfB Stuttgart	3–0	FSV Frankfurt	Stuttgart
20:30	Hemlein 4'; Cacau 38'; Traoré 89'	Report		Stadium: Mercedes-Benz Arena; Attendance: 18,270; Referee: Christian Leicher

26 October 2011	Eintracht Frankfurt	0–1 (a.e.t.)	1. FC Kaiserslautern	Frankfurt
20:30		Report	119' Sukuta-Pasu	Stadium: Commerzbank-Arena; Attendance: 46,000; Referee: Wolfgang Stark

=== Round of 16 ===
The draw for this round took place on 30 October 2011. The matches were played on 20–21 December 2011.

20 December 2011	VfL Bochum	1–2	Bayern Munich	Bochum
19:00	Federico 26'	Report	52' Kroos; 90+1' Robben	Stadium: Rewirpower-Stadion; Attendance: 29,299; Referee: Michael Weiner

20 December 2011	1. FC Nürnberg	0–1	Greuther Fürth	Nuremberg
19:00		Report	15' Prib	Stadium: Easycredit-Stadion; Attendance: 48,548; Referee: Knut Kircher

20 December 2011	1899 Hoffenheim	2–1	FC Augsburg	Sinsheim
20:30	Salihović 23'; Ibišević 49'	Report	36' Oehrl	Stadium: Rhein-Neckar-Arena; Attendance: 10,000; Referee: Thorsten Kinhöfer

20 December 2011	Fortuna Düsseldorf	0–0 (a.e.t.) (4–5 p)	Borussia Dortmund	Düsseldorf
20:30		Report		Stadium: Esprit Arena; Attendance: 54,000; Referee: Manuel Gräfe
	Penalties
	Jovanović (penalty scored); Langeneke (penalty scored); Lambertz (penalty scored); Bröker (penalty missed); Rösler (penalty scored)		(penalty scored) Hummels; (penalty scored) Błaszczykowski; (penalty scored) Kehl; (penalty scored) Gündoğan; (penalty scored) Perišić

21 December 2011	Hertha BSC	3–1	1. FC Kaiserslautern	Berlin
19:00	Ramos 43'; Lasogga 59'; Ebert 90+1'	Report	51' Shechter	Stadium: Olympiastadion; Attendance: 40,944; Referee: Florian Meyer

21 December 2011	Holstein Kiel	2–0	Mainz 05	Kiel
19:00	Ujah 6' (o.g.); Müller 64'	Report		Stadium: Holstein-Stadion; Attendance: 10,649; Referee: Günter Perl

21 December 2011	VfB Stuttgart	2–1	Hamburger SV	Stuttgart
20:30	Cacau 23', 62'	Report	54' (o.g.) Kvist	Stadium: Mercedes-Benz Arena; Attendance: 38,600; Referee: Peter Gagelmann

21 December 2011	Borussia Mönchengladbach	3–1	Schalke 04	Mönchengladbach
20:30	Arango 18'; Reus 56', 88'	Report	70' Draxler	Stadium: Borussia-Park; Attendance: 54,057; Referee: Wolfgang Stark

=== Quarter-finals ===
The draw for this round took place on 21 December 2011. The matches were played on 7–8 February 2012.

All times CET

7 February 2012	Holstein Kiel	0–4	Borussia Dortmund	Kiel
20:30		Report	11' Lewandowski; 18' Kagawa; 80' Barrios; 87' Perišić	Stadium: Holstein-Stadion; Attendance: 11,386; Referee: Felix Zwayer (Berlin)

8 February 2012	1899 Hoffenheim	0–1	Greuther Fürth	Sinsheim
19:00		Report	44' Occéan	Stadium: Rhein-Neckar-Arena; Attendance: 14,000; Referee: Marco Fritz (Korb)

8 February 2012	Hertha BSC	0–2 (a.e.t.)	Borussia Mönchengladbach	Berlin
19:00		Report	101' (pen.) Daems; 120' Wendt	Stadium: Olympiastadion; Attendance: 47,465; Referee: Felix Brych (Munich)

8 February 2012	VfB Stuttgart	0–2	Bayern Munich	Stuttgart
20:30		Report	30' Ribéry; 46' Gómez	Stadium: Mercedes-Benz Arena; Attendance: 57,500; Referee: Florian Meyer (Burgdorf)

=== Semi-finals ===
The draw for this round took place on 11 February 2012. The matches were played on 20–21 March 2012.

All times CET

20 March 2012
20:30

Greuther Fürth	0–1 (a.e.t.)	Borussia Dortmund
	Report	120' Gündoğan

Trolli Arena, Fürth
Attendance: 15,500
Referee: Florian Meyer (Burgdorf)

21 March 2012
20:30

Borussia Mönchengladbach	0–0 (a.e.t.)	Bayern Munich
	Report
Penalties
Daems (penalty scored); Herrmann (penalty scored); Dante (penalty missed); Nordtveit (penalty missed)	2 – 4	(penalty scored) Alaba; (penalty scored) Ribéry; (penalty scored) Lahm; (penalty scored) Kroos

Borussia-Park, Mönchengladbach
Attendance: 54,049
Referee: Thorsten Kinhöfer (Herne)

=== Final ===
12 May 2012
20:00 CEST

Borussia Dortmund	5–2	Bayern Munich
Kagawa 3'; Hummels 41' (pen.); Lewandowski 45+1', 58', 81'	Report	Robben 25' (pen.); Ribéry 75'

Olympiastadion, Berlin
Attendance: 75,708
Referee: Peter Gagelmann (Bremen)

== Top goalscorers ==
Final statistics.

7 goals

- (Poland) Robert Lewandowski (Borussia Dortmund)

5 goals

- (Netherlands) Klaas-Jan Huntelaar (Schalke 04)

4 goals

- (Colombia) Adrián Ramos (Hertha BSC)
- (Turkey) Sercan Sararer (Greuther Fürth)

3 goals

- (Germany) Cacau (VfB Stuttgart)
- (Germany) Markus Feulner (1. FC Nürnberg)
- (Germany) Daniel Frahn (RB Leipzig)
- (Germany) Marco Reus (Borussia Mönchengladbach)
- (Germany) Sascha Rösler (Fortuna Düsseldorf)
- (United States) Matthew Taylor (SC Paderborn)
