= Florian Krebs =

Florian Krebs may refer to:

- Florian Krebs (footballer, born 1988)
- Florian Krebs (footballer, born 1999)
