= Shinji Kagawa =

Japanese footballer (born 1989)

Shinji Kagawa 香川 真司
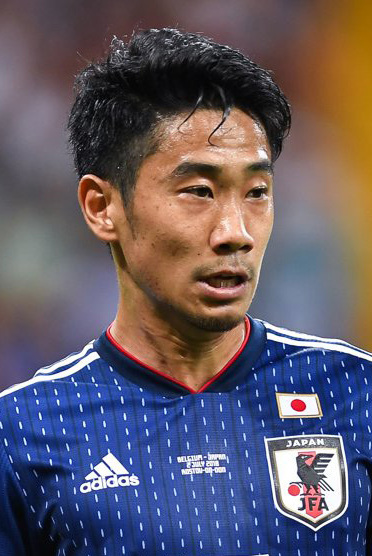
- Kagawa with Japan in 2018

Personal information
- Full name: Shinji Kagawa
- Date of birth: 17 March 1989 (age 37)
- Place of birth: Kobe, Japan
- Height: 1.75 m (5 ft 9 in)
- Position: Midfielder

Team information
- Current team: Cerezo Osaka
- Number: 8

Youth career
- 1994–1999: Marino FC
- 1999–2001: Kobe NK FC
- 2001–2005: FC Miyagi Barcelona
- 2005–2007: Cerezo Osaka

Senior career*
Years	Team	Apps	(Gls)
2007–2010	Cerezo Osaka	125	(55)
2010–2012	Borussia Dortmund	49	(21)
2012–2014	Manchester United	38	(6)
2014–2019	Borussia Dortmund	99	(20)
2018	Borussia Dortmund II	1	(0)
2019	→ Beşiktaş (loan)	14	(4)
2019–2020	Real Zaragoza	33	(4)
2021	PAOK	6	(0)
2022–2023	Sint-Truiden	18	(2)
2023–	Cerezo Osaka	94	(6)

International career^{‡}
2006–2008	Japan U19	4	(0)
2007	Japan U20	2	(0)
2008	Japan U23	3	(0)
2008–2019	Japan	97	(31)
Medal record
Men's football
Representing Japan
AFC Asian Cup
Winner	2011 Qatar
- * Club domestic league appearances and goals as of 10 August 2026 ‡ National team caps and goals as of 9 August 2019 (UTC)

Shinji Kagawa (Japanese: 香川 真司, Kagawa Shinji [kaꜜɡawa ɕiꜜndʑi]; born 17 March 1989) is a Japanese professional footballer who plays as a midfielder for J1 League club Cerezo Osaka. He is widely regarded as one of the best Japanese players of all time.

Kagawa began his professional career in Japan with Cerezo Osaka, where he became the first midfielder in J.League history to claim the top scorer title, playing as a shadow striker. In the 2009 season, he formed a partnership with Takashi Inui, which played a role in his emergence as the J2 League's top scorer. He led the J2 League in both goals and assists that season.

He joined Borussia Dortmund in 2010. After two years with Dortmund, Kagawa signed for Manchester United on a four-year contract. Two years later, he returned to Dortmund. He later played for Beşiktaş in Turkey, Real Zaragoza in Spain, PAOK in Greece, and Sint-Truiden in Belgium before returning to Japan, rejoining Cerezo Osaka at the end of January 2023. Kagawa holds the record for most appearances and goals by a Japanese player in UEFA club competitions.

Since making his senior international debut in May 2008, he has won over 90 caps and scored over 30 goals. On 29 November 2012, Kagawa was named the Asian Football Confederation's International Player of the Year.

== Club career ==
Kagawa was born in Kobe, Hyōgo Prefecture. He started playing football at the age of five. He played for Marino Football Club from 1994 to 1999, Kobe NK Football Club from 1999 to 2001, and FC Miyagi Barcelona in Sendai from 2001 to 2005.

=== Cerezo Osaka ===
Cerezo Osaka noticed his talent and signed him at the age of 17. He was the first player in Japan to sign a professional contract before graduating from high school, except players promoted from youth teams of the J.League clubs. In 2007, he gained a regular position but the club missed promotion to the J.League Division 1. He became the top scorer of J.League Division 2 and drew widespread attention in 2009.

=== Borussia Dortmund ===
==== 2010–11 season ====
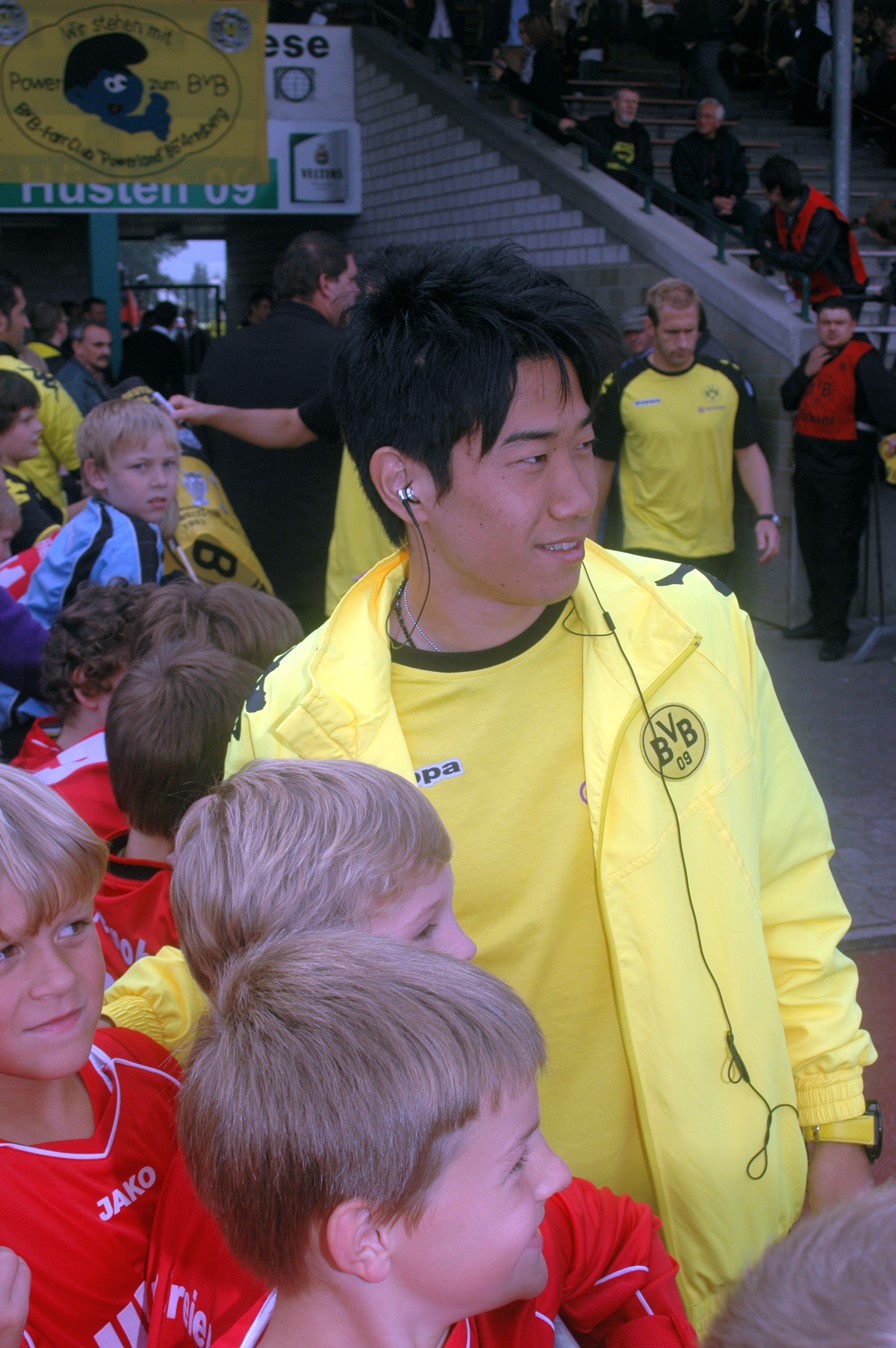
Kagawa with Borussia Dortmund in 2011

In the summer of 2010, Kagawa transferred from Cerezo to Borussia Dortmund for €350,000. The relatively low cost of the transfer was because of a release clause in Kagawa's contract with Cerezo, which allowed him to leave the club cheaply if he had an opportunity to play in Europe.

On 23 August 2010, he made his debut appearance in the Bundesliga, starting for his new club Dortmund. After scoring his first two competitive goals for the club in the UEFA Europa League qualifying tie against Qarabağ, he continued this form with his first goal in the Bundesliga against VfL Wolfsburg, which Dortmund won 2–0. In the Revierderby against arch-rivals Schalke 04, Kagawa said before the match that he would score two goals, which he then did as Dortmund won 3–1.

Kagawa missed the second half of the Bundesliga season because of an injury he picked up during international duty with Japan. His strong effort in the first half of the season helped his side finish as champions of the Bundesliga, and he was named in the Bundesliga Best XI, scoring eight goals in 18 appearances.

==== 2011–12 season ====
Kagawa was back in time for the start of the 2011–12 Bundesliga campaign and quickly found his way back into the starting line-up. Kagawa scored his first goal of the new Bundesliga season on 18 September, coming in a 2–1 loss to Hannover 96, as Dortmund gave up two goals in the last three minutes. On 22 October, Kagawa opened the scoring in the seventh minute as Dortmund won against Köln 5–0 at the Signal Iduna Park. Kagawa scored again on 5 November, as Dortmund brushed aside VfL Wolfsburg 5–1 and moved within two points of league leaders Bayern Munich. Kagawa scored a late consolation against Arsenal in a 2–1 loss in the group stage of the Champions League.

On 28 January 2012, Kagawa scored twice in Dortmund's 3–1 win against Hoffenheim. Kagawa scored the only goal of the game against Werder Bremen on 17 March, heading in a pass from İlkay Gündoğan in the eighth minute. Kagawa scored two goals in Dortmund's 6-1 win against Köln on 25 March, keeping Dortmund five points ahead of Bayern in the title race. Borussia Dortmund went on to win the league title with 81 points, setting a Bundesliga record. Kagawa also scored a goal and provided an assist for Dortmund against rivals Bayern Munich in their victory in the 2012 DFB-Pokal final. He scored a total of 13 goals and recorded 12 assists in the 2011-12 season.

=== Manchester United ===
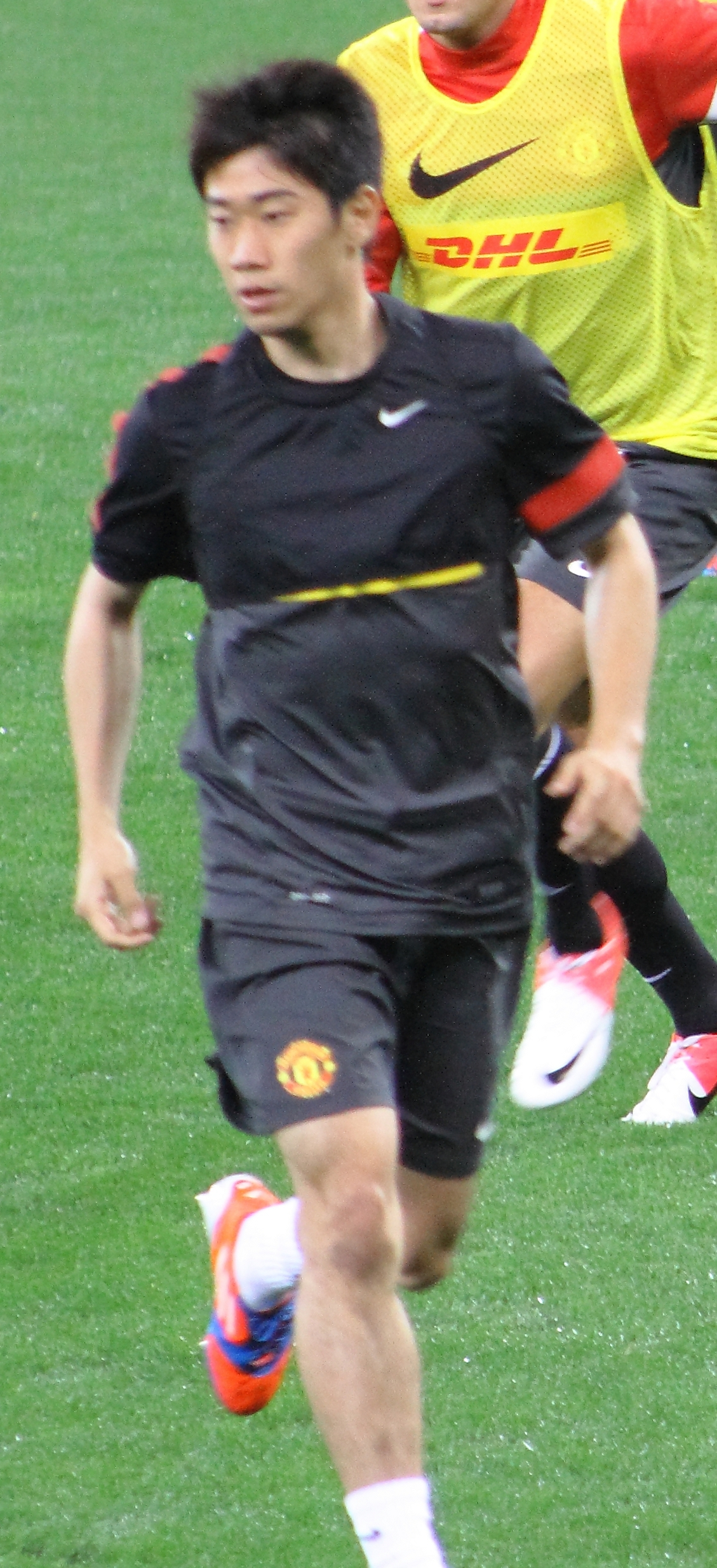
Kagawa training with Manchester United in 2012

On 5 June 2012, Manchester United announced that they had reached an agreement with Borussia Dortmund and Kagawa for his transfer, a deal that made him the first Japanese player to join the club. The fee was reported to be an initial £12 million, with a further £5 million in possible add-ons. The transfer was completed on 22 June after Kagawa passed his medical at Manchester United and received his UK work permit. On 3 July, it was revealed that Kagawa would wear the number 26 shirt for United. Kagawa spoke about his former club, Borussia Dortmund, saying: "I will carry this club, their great fans, and the whole city in my heart forever and will follow their results with great interest."

On 18 July 2012, Kagawa was handed a two-minute appearance to mark his Manchester United debut in Durban, South Africa, against AmaZulu in a pre-season friendly match. Kagawa made his first start for the Red Devils against Ajax Cape Town on 21 July 2012, and scored his first goal against Shanghai Shenhua four days later.

His Premier League debut was on 20 August 2012, playing the full 90 minutes of United's 1–0 defeat away to Everton. He scored his first goal against Fulham on 25 August in his home debut for the club. After Tom Cleverley's shot was parried by Fulham goalkeeper Mark Schwarzer, Kagawa scored on the rebound from close range. On 19 September, Kagawa was given his first Champions League start as United played against Galatasaray. He provided an assist for the winning goal scored by Michael Carrick in a 1–0 win. On 23 October, he set up Javier Hernández for United's first goal in an eventual 3–2 Champions League victory against Braga. He twisted his knee during the match, which left him sidelined for two months. Kagawa returned from injury in January 2013.

On 2 March 2013, Kagawa scored his first hat-trick for United and also became the first Asian player to score a hat-trick in the Premier League, in his team's 4–0 home win against Norwich City. On 22 April, Kagawa played a part in the title-winning match against Aston Villa in which United won 3–0; he became the first Japanese player to win a Premier League title. On 12 May, Kagawa was included in the United squad to play against Swansea City in Alex Ferguson's last home game before retirement, which United won 2–1. On the same day, Kagawa received his Premier League medal and was voted Man of the Match.

=== Return to Dortmund ===
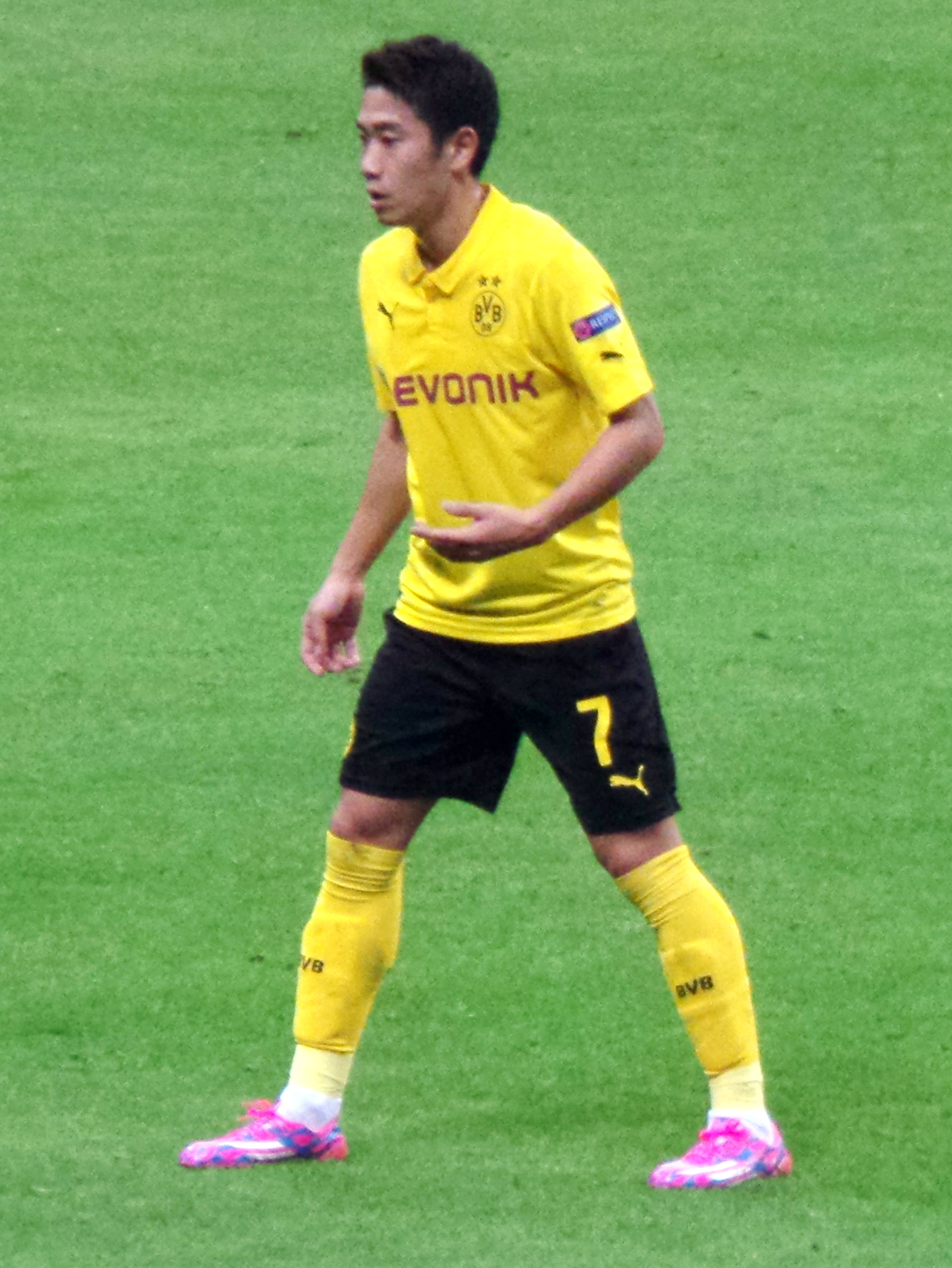
Kagawa playing for Borussia Dortmund in 2014

On 31 August 2014, Kagawa officially returned to his former club, Borussia Dortmund, for an undisclosed fee thought to be around £6.5 million, signing a contract until 30 June 2018. He was assigned the shirt number 7 which was vacated by Jonas Hofmann, who had left Dortmund to join Mainz 05 on loan. On his return debut, Kagawa scored a goal and set up another to help Dortmund win 3–1 against SC Freiburg.

On 14 July 2017, Kagawa extended his contract with Dortmund until 2020.

In the first half of the 2018–19 season, a combination of injury and coach Lucien Favre's preference to play Marco Reus as a central attacking midfielder meant Kagawa played just four times for Dortmund. That led to Kagawa joining Turkish club Beşiktaş on loan for the remainder of the season.

=== Real Zaragoza ===
On 9 August 2019, Kagawa completed a transfer to Real Zaragoza of Spain's Segunda División, penning a two-year contract. He debuted for the club on 17 August 2019, in the 2019–20 Segunda División opening match against Tenerife at La Romareda, which Zaragoza won 2–0. Eight days later, he scored his first goal in a 1–1 draw against Ponferradina.

On 2 October 2020, Kagawa's contract was terminated by Zaragoza.

=== PAOK ===
On 27 January 2021, Kagawa joined Super League Greece club PAOK on a one-and-a-half-year contract. PAOK won the Greek Cup that season, with Kagawa playing in three matches and giving one assist in the competition. On 18 December 2021, due to not being part of Răzvan Lucescu's plans, despite some opportunities at the start of the 2021–22 season, Kagawa mutually terminated his contract with the club. He received no recompense for the remaining six months of his contract. Kagawa left PAOK after almost a year, having only 12 appearances in competitive games, of which only three were as a starter.

=== Sint-Truiden ===
On 10 January 2022, Kagawa signed with Belgian club Sint-Truiden.

Shinji Kagawa made a total of 18 competitive appearances for Belgian club Sint-Truiden across two seasons (2021–2022 and 2022–2023). A breakdown of his time with the club:

2021-2022 Season: six appearances in the Belgian Jupiler Pro League.

2022-2023 Season: 12 appearances across all competitions, where he scored two goals.

=== Return to Cerezo Osaka ===
On 31 January 2023, Kagawa returned to Japan, joining his boyhood club Cerezo Osaka on a free transfer. On 12 March, on his first start for the club in 14 years, he scored his first goal in a 2–1 win against Sagan Tosu, securing their first win of the season.

Under head coach Arthur Papas, he made a notable impact in the opening match of the 2025 J.League season—the Osaka Derby—by scoring one goal and providing one assist in a 5–2 victory.

== International career ==
Kagawa played as a member of the Japan under-20 national team in the 2007 FIFA U-20 World Cup held in Canada.

In 2008, he was selected to play as a member of the Japan under-23 team for the 2008 Summer Olympics.

On 24 May 2008, he made his senior international debut in a friendly Kirin Cup match. Japan won the match against Ivory Coast 1–0. However, he was not selected in Takeshi Okada's final 23-man squad for the 2010 FIFA World Cup in South Africa. In September 2010, he scored the only goal of the game in Japan's win over Paraguay in Yokohama.

Kagawa was included in the 2011 AFC Asian Cup by coach Alberto Zaccheroni. In the quarter-final against Qatar, he scored two goals. The game ended in 3–2 win for Japan. In the semi-final against South Korea, Kagawa broke his metatarsal bone and missed the final where Japan beat Australia after extra-time.

Kagawa was named in Japan's 23-man squad for the 2013 FIFA Confederations Cup and scored the second goal for his country during the group stage match against Italy, which ended in a 4–3 loss. He was selected for his first World Cup in 2014, but made little impact as Japan was eliminated in the group stage.

At the 2015 AFC Asian Cup, Kagawa scored Japan's second goal during a 2–0 victory against Jordan in the group stage and was named as man of the match.

Kagawa participated in Japan's quarter-final match against the United Arab Emirates. After the match ended 1–1 after extra time, Kagawa, who was Japan's final kicker in the penalty shoot-out, hit the post with his kick, as Japan ended up losing the shoot-out 5–4.

Kagawa was included in Japan's World Cup squad ahead of the 2018 FIFA World Cup in Russia. On 19 June, he scored a penalty against Colombia in an eventual 2-1 victory for Japan.

== Style of play ==
Kagawa is a versatile attacking midfielder who can play through the middle or on either flank. He is known for his passing, movement, and positioning during attack.

While playing for Japan, he has featured in left midfield and central attacking roles. From 2023 onward, Kagawa has primarily been deployed as a central midfielder.

== Career statistics ==
=== Club ===
As of match played 25 August 2025

Appearances and goals by club, season and competition
Club	Season	League			National cup (Note: Includes Emperor's Cup, DFB-Pokal, FA Cup, Copa del Rey, Greek Football Cup)		League cup (Note: Includes J.League Cup, Football League Cup)		Continental		Other		Total	
Club	Season	Division	Apps	Goals	Apps	Goals	Apps	Goals	Apps	Goals	Apps	Goals	Apps	Goals
Cerezo Osaka	2006	J.League Division 1	0	0	0	0	0	0	—		—		0	0
Cerezo Osaka	2007	J.League Division 2	35	5	1	2	—		—		—		36	7
Cerezo Osaka	2008	J.League Division 2	35	16	0	0	—		—		—		35	16
Cerezo Osaka	2009	J.League Division 2	44	27	0	0	—		—		—		44	27
Cerezo Osaka	2010	J.League Division 1	11	7	—		1	0	—		—		12	7
Cerezo Osaka	Total		125	55	1	2	1	0	—		—		127	57
Borussia Dortmund	2010–11	Bundesliga	18	8	2	0	—		8 (Note: Appearances in UEFA Europa League)	4	—		28	12
Borussia Dortmund	2011–12	Bundesliga	31	13	5	3	—		6 (Note: Appearance(s) in UEFA Champions League)	1	1 (Note: Appearance in DFL-Supercup)	0	43	17
Borussia Dortmund	Total		49	21	7	3	—		14	5	1	0	71	29
Manchester United	2012–13	Premier League	20	6	3	0	0	0	3	0	—		26	6
Manchester United	2013–14	Premier League	18	0	1	0	2	0	8	0	1 (Note: Appearance in FA Community Shield)	0	30	0
Manchester United	2014–15	Premier League	0	0	—		1	0	—		—		1	0
Manchester United	Total		38	6	4	0	3	0	11	0	1	0	57	6
Borussia Dortmund	2014–15	Bundesliga	28	5	5	1	—		5	0	—		38	6
Borussia Dortmund	2015–16	Bundesliga	29	9	5	1	—		12	3	—		46	13
Borussia Dortmund	2016–17	Bundesliga	21	1	3	2	—		5	3	1	0	30	6
Borussia Dortmund	2017–18	Bundesliga	19	5	3	1	—		5	0	0	0	27	6
Borussia Dortmund	2018–19	Bundesliga	2	0	1	0	—		1	0	0	0	4	0
Borussia Dortmund	Total		99	20	17	5	—		28	6	1	0	145	31
Borussia Dortmund II	2018–19	Regionalliga	1	0	—		—		—		—		1	0
Beşiktaş (loan)	2018–19	Süper Lig	14	4	—		—		0	0	—		14	4
Zaragoza	2019–20	Segunda División	31	4	3	0	—		—		2 (Note: Appearances in La Liga promotion play-offs)	0	36	4
PAOK	2020–21	Super League Greece	5	0	3	0	—		—		—		8	0
PAOK	2021–22	Super League Greece	1	0	—		—		3 (Note: Appearances in UEFA Europa Conference League)	0	—		4	0
PAOK	Total		6	0	3	0	—		3	0	0	0	12	0
Sint-Truiden	2021–22	Belgian Pro League	6	0	—		—		—		—		6	0
Sint-Truiden	2022–23	Belgian Pro League	12	2	0	0	—		—		—		12	2
Sint-Truiden	Total		18	2	0	0	—		—		—		18	2
Cerezo Osaka	2023	J1 League	34	2	1	0	4	0	—		—		39	2
Cerezo Osaka	2024	J1 League	10	1	1	0	2	0	—		—		13	1
Cerezo Osaka	2025	J1 League	22	2	0	0	5	2	—		—		27	4
Cerezo Osaka	Total		66	5	2	0	11	2	—		—		79	7
Career total			447	117	37	10	15	2	56	11	5	0	560	140

=== International ===
As of 10 June 2019

Appearances and goals by national team and year
National team	Year	Apps	Goals
Japan	2008	6	1
Japan	2009	4	1
Japan	2010	7	1
Japan	2011	11	6
Japan	2012	9	3
Japan	2013	16	4
Japan	2014	10	3
Japan	2015	14	4
Japan	2016	7	4
Japan	2017	5	2
Japan	2018	6	2
Japan	2019	2	0
Total		97	31

Scores and results list Japan's goal tally first, score column indicates score after each Kagawa goal.

List of international goals scored by Shinji Kagawa
No.	Date	Venue	Opponent	Score	Result	Competition
1	9 October 2008	Denka Big Swan Stadium, Niigata City, Japan	United Arab Emirates	1–0	1–1	Friendly
2	4 February 2009	National Olympic Stadium, Tokyo, Japan	Finland	3–0	5–1	Friendly
3	4 September 2010	Nissan Stadium, Yokohama, Japan	Paraguay	1–0	1–0	Friendly
4	21 January 2011	Thani bin Jassim Stadium, Al Rayyan, Qatar	Qatar	1–1	3–2	2011 AFC Asian Cup
5	21 January 2011	Thani bin Jassim Stadium, Al Rayyan, Qatar	Qatar	2–2	3–2	2011 AFC Asian Cup
6	10 August 2011	Sapporo Dome, Sapporo, Japan	South Korea	1–0	3–0	Friendly
7	10 August 2011	Sapporo Dome, Sapporo, Japan	South Korea	3–0	3–0	Friendly
8	11 October 2011	Nagai Stadium, Osaka, Japan	Tajikistan	4–0	8–0	2014 FIFA World Cup qualification
9	11 October 2011	Nagai Stadium, Osaka, Japan	Tajikistan	7–0	8–0	2014 FIFA World Cup qualification
10	23 May 2012	Shizuoka Stadium, Fukuroi, Japan	Azerbaijan	1–0	2–0	Friendly
11	8 June 2012	Saitama Stadium 2002, Saitama, Japan	Jordan	4–0	6–0	2014 FIFA World Cup qualification
12	12 October 2012	Stade de France, Saint-Denis, France	France	1–0	1–0	Friendly
13	26 March 2013	King Abdullah Stadium, Amman, Jordan	Jordan	1–2	1–2	2014 FIFA World Cup qualification
14	20 June 2013	Itaipava Arena Pernambuco, São Lourenço da Mata, Brazil	Italy	2–0	3–4	2013 FIFA Confederations Cup
15	14 August 2013	Miyagi Stadium, Rifu, Japan	Uruguay	1–3	2–4	Friendly
16	10 September 2013	Saitama Stadium 2002, Saitama, Japan	Ghana	1–1	3–1	Friendly
17	5 March 2014	National Olympic Stadium, Tokyo, Japan	New Zealand	2–0	4–2	Friendly
18	2 June 2014	Raymond James Stadium, Tampa, United States	Costa Rica	2–1	3–1	Friendly
19	7 June 2014	Raymond James Stadium, Tampa, United States	Zambia	2–2	4–3	Friendly
20	20 January 2015	Melbourne Rectangular Stadium, Melbourne, Australia	Jordan	2–0	2–0	2015 AFC Asian Cup
21	3 September 2015	Saitama Stadium 2002, Saitama, Japan	Cambodia	3–0	3–0	2018 FIFA World Cup qualification
22	8 September 2015	Azadi Stadium, Tehran, Iran	Afghanistan	1–0	6–0	2018 FIFA World Cup qualification
23	8 September 2015	Azadi Stadium, Tehran, Iran	Afghanistan	3–0	6–0	2018 FIFA World Cup qualification
24	29 March 2016	Saitama Stadium 2002, Saitama, Japan	Syria	2–0	5–0	2018 FIFA World Cup qualification
25	29 March 2016	Saitama Stadium 2002, Saitama, Japan	Syria	4–0	5–0	2018 FIFA World Cup qualification
26	3 June 2016	Toyota Stadium, Toyota, Japan	Bulgaria	2–0	7–2	2016 Kirin Challenge Cup
27	3 June 2016	Toyota Stadium, Toyota, Japan	Bulgaria	3–0	7–2	2016 Kirin Challenge Cup
28	28 March 2017	Saitama Stadium 2002, Saitama, Japan	Thailand	1–0	4–0	2018 FIFA World Cup qualification
29	10 October 2017	Nissan Stadium, Yokohama, Japan	Haiti	3–3	3–3	2017 Kirin Challenge Cup
30	12 June 2018	Tivoli-Neu, Innsbruck, Austria	Paraguay	4–2	4–2	Friendly
31	19 June 2018	Mordovia Arena, Saransk, Russia	Colombia	1–0	2–1	2018 FIFA World Cup

== Honours ==
Borussia Dortmund

- Bundesliga: 2010–11, 2011–12
- DFB-Pokal: 2011–12, 2016–17

Manchester United

- Premier League: 2012–13
- FA Community Shield: 2013

Japan

- AFC Asian Cup: 2011

Individual

- Bundesliga Player of the Hinrunde: 2010
- kicker Bundesliga Team of the Season: 2010–11, 2011–12
- kicker Bundesliga first half of the 2012 season, only one selected for world class.
- VDV Team of the Season: 2011–12
- ESM Team of the Season: 2011–12
- AFC Asian International Player of the Year: 2012
- Bundesliga Team of the Season: 2015–16
- IFFHS Asian Men's Team of All Time: 2021
