= 2012 DFB-Pokal final =

Association football match

- Match programme cover
- Event: 2011–12 DFB-Pokal
Borussia Dortmund	Bayern Munich
5	2
- Date: 12 May 2012
- Venue: Olympiastadion, Berlin
- Referee: Peter Gagelmann (Bremen)
- Attendance: 75,708
- Weather: Clear; 11 °C (52 °F); 41% humidity

The 2011–12 DFB-Pokal, the 62nd season of Germany's premier football cup competition, came to a close on 12 May 2012 when Borussia Dortmund played against Bayern Munich at the Olympiastadion in Berlin.

Borussia Dortmund won 5–2, their third DFB-Pokal triumph and the completion of their first Bundesliga and DFB-Pokal double.

== Route to the final ==
The DFB-Pokal began with 64 teams in a single-elimination knockout cup competition. There were a total of five rounds leading up to the final. Teams were drawn against each other, and the winner after 90 minutes advanced. If still tied, 30 minutes of extra time were played. If the score was still level, a penalty shoot-out was used to determine the winner.

Note: In all results below, the score of the finalist is given first (H: home; A: away).

Borussia Dortmund		Round	Bayern Munich	
Opponent	Result	2011–12 DFB-Pokal	Opponent	Result
SV Sandhausen (A)	3–0	First round	Eintracht Braunschweig (A)	3–0
Dynamo Dresden (H)	2–0	Second round	FC Ingolstadt (H)	6–0
Fortuna Düsseldorf (A)	0–0 (a.e.t.) (5–4 p)	Round of 16	VfL Bochum (A)	2–1
Holstein Kiel (A)	4–0	Quarter-finals	VfB Stuttgart (A)	2–0
Greuther Fürth (A)	1–0 (a.e.t.)	Semi-finals	Borussia Mönchengladbach (A)	0–0 (a.e.t.) (4–2 p)

== Match ==
=== Details ===
12 May 2012
20:00 CEST

Borussia Dortmund	5–2	Bayern Munich
Kagawa 3'; Hummels 41' (pen.); Lewandowski 45+1', 58', 81'	Report	Robben 25' (pen.); Ribéry 75'

Olympiastadion, Berlin
Attendance: 75,708
Referee: Peter Gagelmann (Bremen)

Borussia Dortmund	Bayern Munich

GK	1	(Germany) Roman Weidenfeller	(yellow card) 23'	(substituted off) 34'
RB	26	(Poland) Łukasz Piszczek
CB	4	(Serbia) Neven Subotić
CB	15	(Germany) Mats Hummels	(yellow card) 83'
LB	29	(Germany) Marcel Schmelzer
CM	21	(Germany) İlkay Gündoğan
CM	5	(Germany) Sebastian Kehl (c)
RW	16	(Poland) Jakub Błaszczykowski		(substituted off) 84'
AM	23	(Japan) Shinji Kagawa		(substituted off) 81'
LW	19	(Germany) Kevin Großkreutz
CF	9	(Poland) Robert Lewandowski
Substitutes:
GK	20	(Australia) Mitchell Langerak		(substituted on) 34'
DF	27	(Brazil) Felipe Santana
MF	7	(Germany) Moritz Leitner
MF	11	(Germany) Mario Götze
MF	14	(Croatia) Ivan Perišić		(substituted on) 84'
MF	22	(Germany) Sven Bender		(substituted on) 81'
FW	18	(Paraguay) Lucas Barrios
Manager:
(Germany) Jürgen Klopp

GK	1	(Germany) Manuel Neuer
RB	21	(Germany) Philipp Lahm (c)
CB	17	(Germany) Jérôme Boateng
CB	28	(Germany) Holger Badstuber	(yellow card) 51'
LB	27	(Austria) David Alaba		(substituted off) 69'
CM	31	(Germany) Bastian Schweinsteiger	(yellow card) 70'
CM	30	(Brazil) Luiz Gustavo		(substituted off) 46'
RW	10	(Netherlands) Arjen Robben
AM	39	(Germany) Toni Kroos
LW	7	(France) Franck Ribéry
CF	33	(Germany) Mario Gómez
Substitutes:
GK	22	(Germany) Hans-Jörg Butt
DF	13	(Brazil) Rafinha
DF	26	(Germany) Diego Contento		(substituted on) 69'
MF	23	(Croatia) Danijel Pranjić
MF	25	(Germany) Thomas Müller		(substituted on) 46'
MF	44	(Ukraine) Anatoliy Tymoshchuk
FW	11	(Croatia) Ivica Olić
Manager:
(Germany) Jupp Heynckes

Assistant referees:
Matthias Anklam (Buchholz in der Nordheide)
Sascha Thielert (Buchholz in der Nordheide)
Fourth official:
Marco Fritz (Korb)

Match rules

- 90 minutes.
- 30 minutes of extra time if necessary.
- Penalty shoot-out if scores still level.
- Seven named substitutes, of which up to three may be used.
