= İlkay Gündoğan =

German footballer (born 1990)

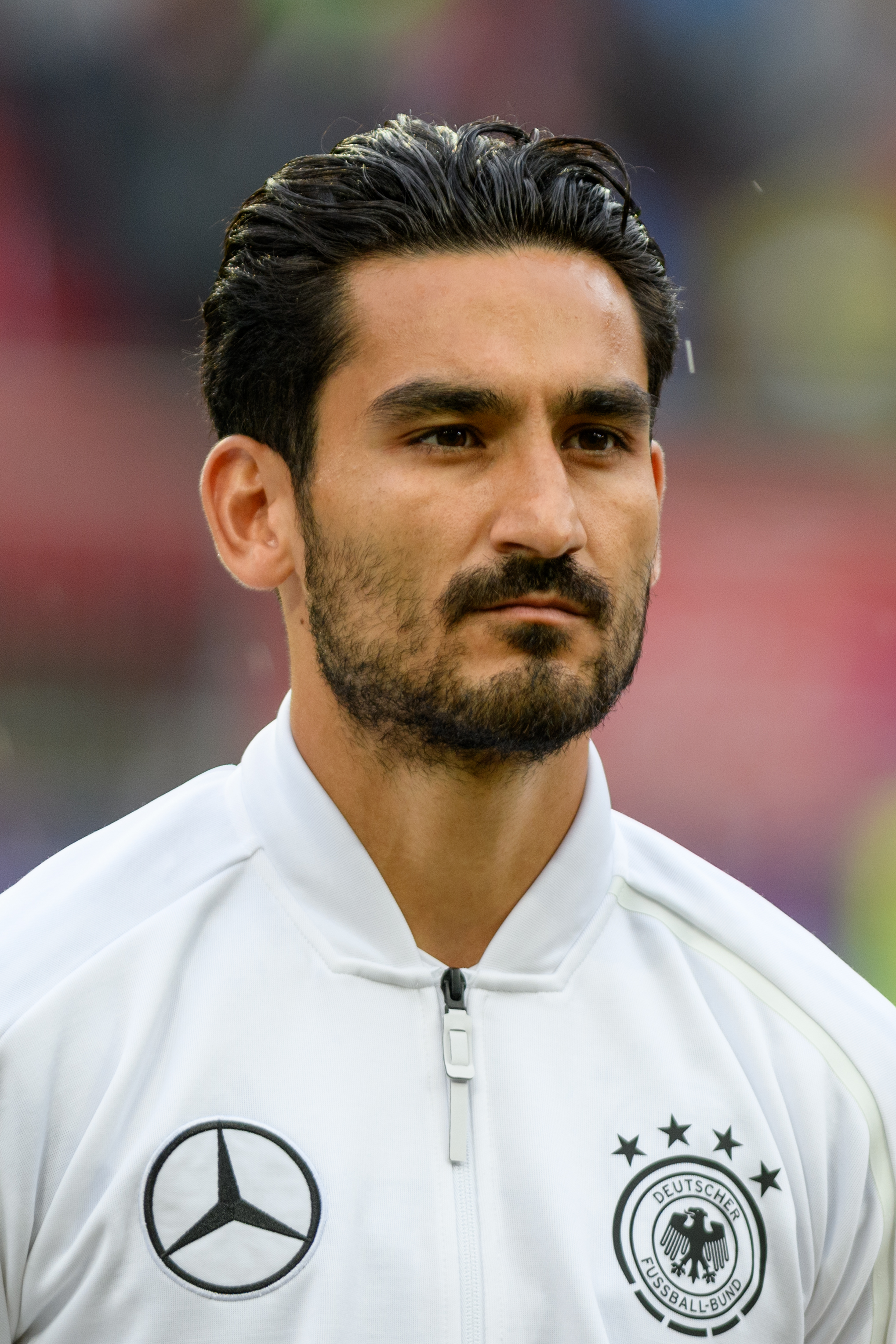
- Gündoğan lining up for Germany in 2018

Personal information
- Full name: İlkay Gündoğan
- Date of birth: 24 October 1990 (age 36)
- Place of birth: Gelsenkirchen, North Rhine-Westphalia, Germany
- Height: 1.80 m (5 ft 11 in)
- Position: Midfielder

Team information
- Current team: Galatasaray
- Number: 20

Youth career
- 1994–1998: SV Gelsenkirchen-Hessler 06
- 1998–1999: Schalke 04
- 1999–2004: SV Gelsenkirchen-Hessler 06
- 2004–2005: SSV Buer
- 2005–2008: VfL Bochum

Senior career*
Years	Team	Apps	(Gls)
2008–2009	VfL Bochum II	2	(1)
2009–2011	1. FC Nürnberg	48	(6)
2011–2016	Borussia Dortmund	105	(10)
2012	Borussia Dortmund II	1	(0)
2016–2023	Manchester City	188	(44)
2023–2024	Barcelona	36	(5)
2024–2025	Manchester City	33	(1)
2025–	Galatasaray	24	(2)

International career
2008	Germany U18	7	(0)
2008–2009	Germany U19	6	(0)
2009–2010	Germany U20	2	(0)
2010–2012	Germany U21	8	(1)
2011–2024	Germany	82	(19)
Medal record
Men's football
Representing Germany
UEFA European Championship
Bronze medal – third place	2012	Team
- * Club domestic league appearances and goals as of 23:47, 17 May 2026 (UTC)

İlkay Gündoğan (Turkish: [ilˈkaj ˈɟyndoan]; born 24 October 1990) is a German professional footballer who plays as a midfielder for Süper Lig club Galatasaray.

A youth academy graduate of VfL Bochum, Gündoğan joined 1. FC Nürnberg in 2009. In 2011, he signed for Borussia Dortmund, where he went on to make over 150 appearances, winning a Bundesliga and DFB-Pokal double in his debut season and scoring in the 2013 UEFA Champions League final they lost to Bayern Munich. Gündoğan signed for Manchester City in 2016, where he would go on to make over 300 appearances and win five Premier League titles, four EFL Cups, two FA Cups, and the Champions League. Appointed club captain in 2022, he led the team to a continental treble in the 2022–23 season, before departing the club. After a season in Spain with Barcelona, he rejoined Manchester City in 2024.

Gündoğan made his debut for the Germany national team in 2011, after previously being capped by the under-18, under-19, under-20, and under-21 teams. He was in Germany's squads for the UEFA European Championship in 2012, 2020, and 2024 (for which he was captain), and the FIFA World Cup in 2018 and 2022.

== Early life ==
İlkay Gündoğan was born on 24 October 1990 in Gelsenkirchen, North Rhine-Westphalia, to Turkish parents. His grandfather on his father's side was a guest worker who moved from Balıkesir, Turkey, to the Ruhr region of Germany to work as a miner. Meanwhile, his wife stayed in Turkey with their children where they grew up and went to school.

== Club career ==
=== Early career ===
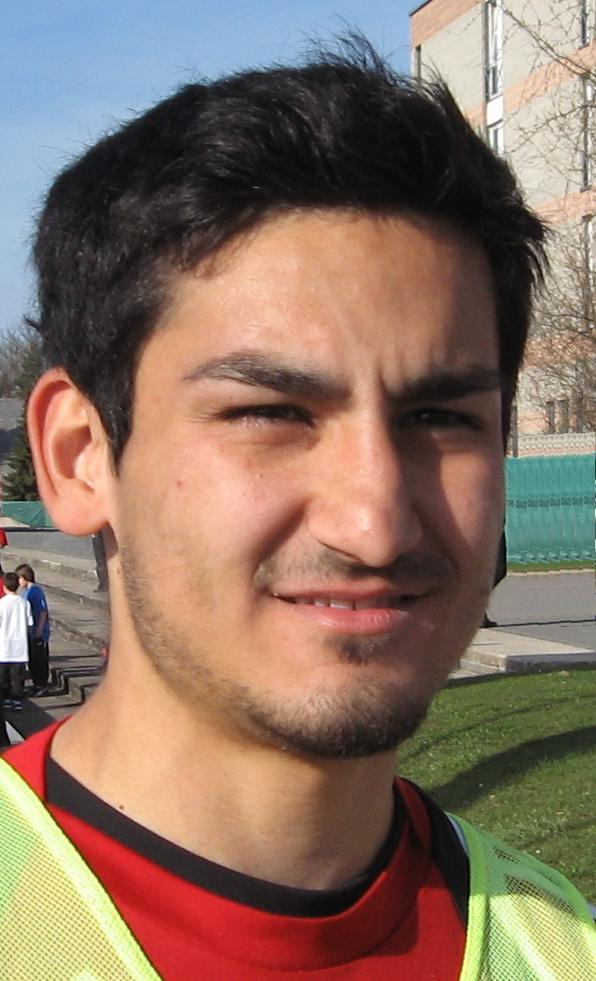
Gündoğan with 1. FC Nürnberg in 2010

Having grown up in Gelsenkirchen, Gündoğan's boyhood affiliation was with Schalke 04, with which he had a brief spell as an eight-year old before being forced to take a break from the sport altogether because of growth problems. He subsequently confessed that this was one of the worst disappointments in his life, one which led him to reject Schalke when the club offered to sign him up again when he was 13-years old, fearing he would be somehow disappointed again.

Gündoğan eventually came through VfL Bochum's youth academy. In 2008, he began playing for the club's reserve team before signing for 2. Bundesliga club 1. FC Nürnberg in 2009. In his fourth Bundesliga match, on 19 September 2009, away against Bayern Munich, he made his first assist. His first goal for Nürnberg came on 20 February 2010 in a home match against Bayern Munich.

=== Borussia Dortmund ===
==== 2011–2013: Domestic double and UEFA Champions League final ====
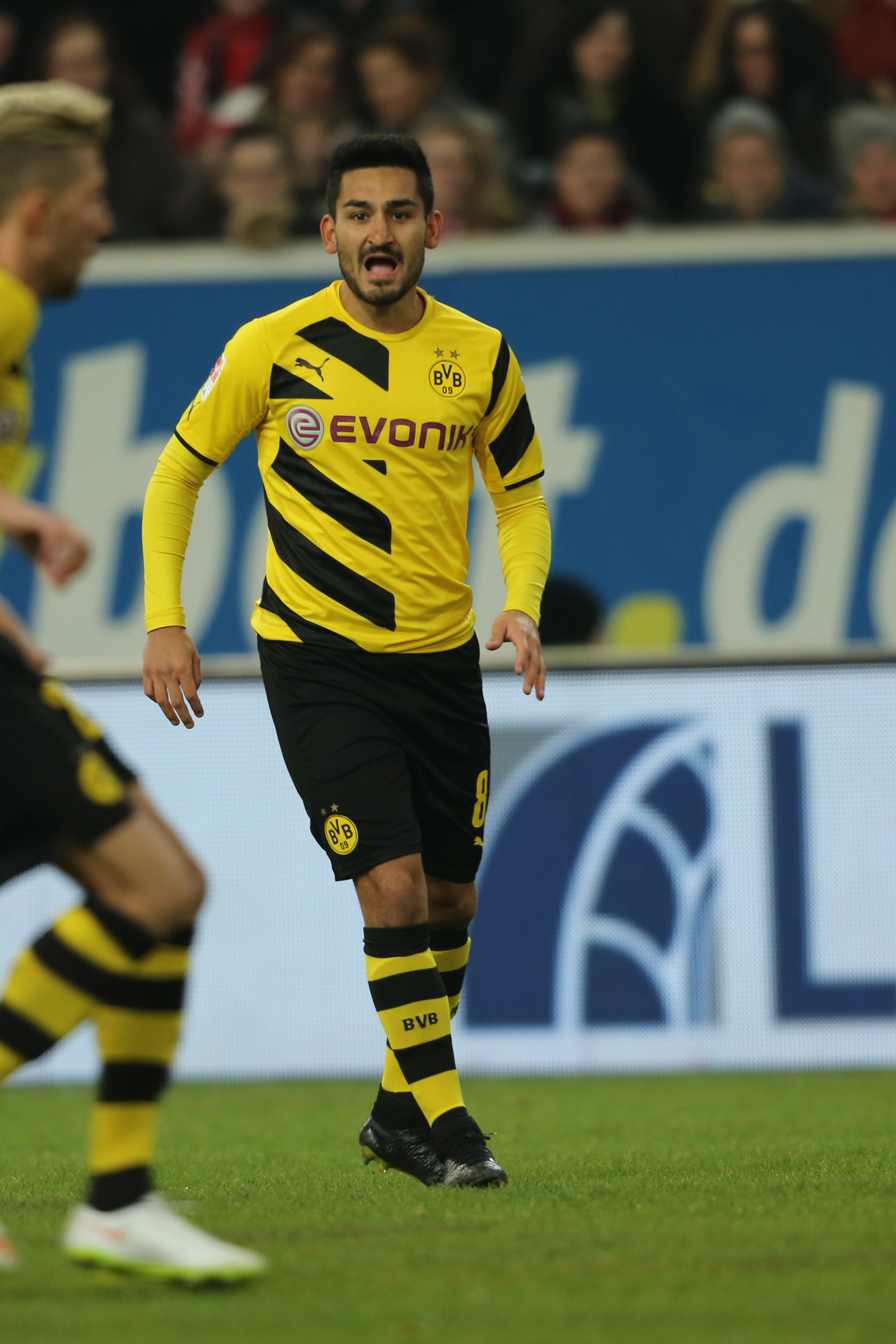
Gündoğan playing for Borussia Dortmund in 2015

On 5 May 2011, Gündoğan signed a four-year contract with another Bundesliga club, Borussia Dortmund. He made his debut on 23 July in the 2011 DFL-Supercup against Schalke. After a 0–0 draw at Arena AufSchalke, he scored Dortmund's first attempt in the penalty shoot-out, which they went on to lose 4–3. On 17 December, he scored his first goal for Dortmund in a 4–1 victory away to SC Freiburg. He played once for the club's reserves on 22 February 2012, being replaced at half time by Rico Benatelli in an eventual 2–1 win over 1. FC Kaiserslautern II at the Stadion Rote Erde. On 20 March, Gündoğan scored a 120th-minute goal which saw Dortmund defeat Greuther Fürth and progress to the 2012 DFB-Pokal final. He played the entire final on 12 May, a 5–2 victory over Bayern Munich that gave Dortmund their first domestic double.

In the 2012–13 season, Gündoğan was one of the central figures of Borussia Dortmund as they reached the 2013 UEFA Champions League final. He was praised for his play in the two semi-final matches against Real Madrid. On 25 May 2013, he scored the equaliser from the penalty spot in the 69th minute to keep Dortmund's hopes alive against Bayern Munich in the Champions League final played at Wembley Stadium in London. This was his first regular-time penalty kick in a game for Dortmund. Bayern Munich went on to win 2–1.

==== 2013–2016: Contract extensions and DFB-Pokal final ====
Gündoğan scored in the 2013 DFL-Supercup on 27 July as Dortmund won 4–2 against rivals Bayern Munich. In August, a back injury picked up while on international duty ruled him out for a full year. Gündoğan signed a new contract with Dortmund in April 2014, to keep him at the club until 2016.

Gündoğan scored in the penalty-shootout victory over Bayern Munich on 28 April 2015, which sent Dortmund to the 2015 DFB-Pokal final. Two days later, it was announced he and Dortmund would not be renewing their contract after its expiration on 30 June 2015. However, on 1 July 2015, Gündoğan signed a contract extension to keep him at Dortmund until June 2017.

=== Manchester City ===
==== 2016–2017: First season and long-term injury ====
On 2 June 2016, Gündoğan signed for Premier League club Manchester City on a four-year contract, for an estimated transfer fee of £20 million. He was the club's first signing under former Bayern Munich manager Pep Guardiola. Gündoğan made his debut on 14 September, playing for the first time in four months in a 2016–17 Champions League group stage game at home to Borussia Mönchengladbach. City won 4–0; Gündoğan won a penalty that was converted by Sergio Agüero. Three days later, Gündoğan started in the squad and scored with a low, right-footed shot against AFC Bournemouth in a 4–0 home win. He scored a brace and set up Agüero's goal against West Bromwich Albion in a 4–0 win at The Hawthorns on 29 October 2016. He continued his run of form by scoring twice against Barcelona in a 3–1 win at home in the group stages of the Champions League.

On 14 December, in a 2016–17 Premier League game against Watford, Gündoğan was substituted in the 44th minute with knee ligament damage. Guardiola stated the player would be out injured for "several months." It was later confirmed Gündoğan tore his cruciate ligament in the right knee and would miss the remainder of the season.

==== 2017–2022: Consecutive Premier League titles ====
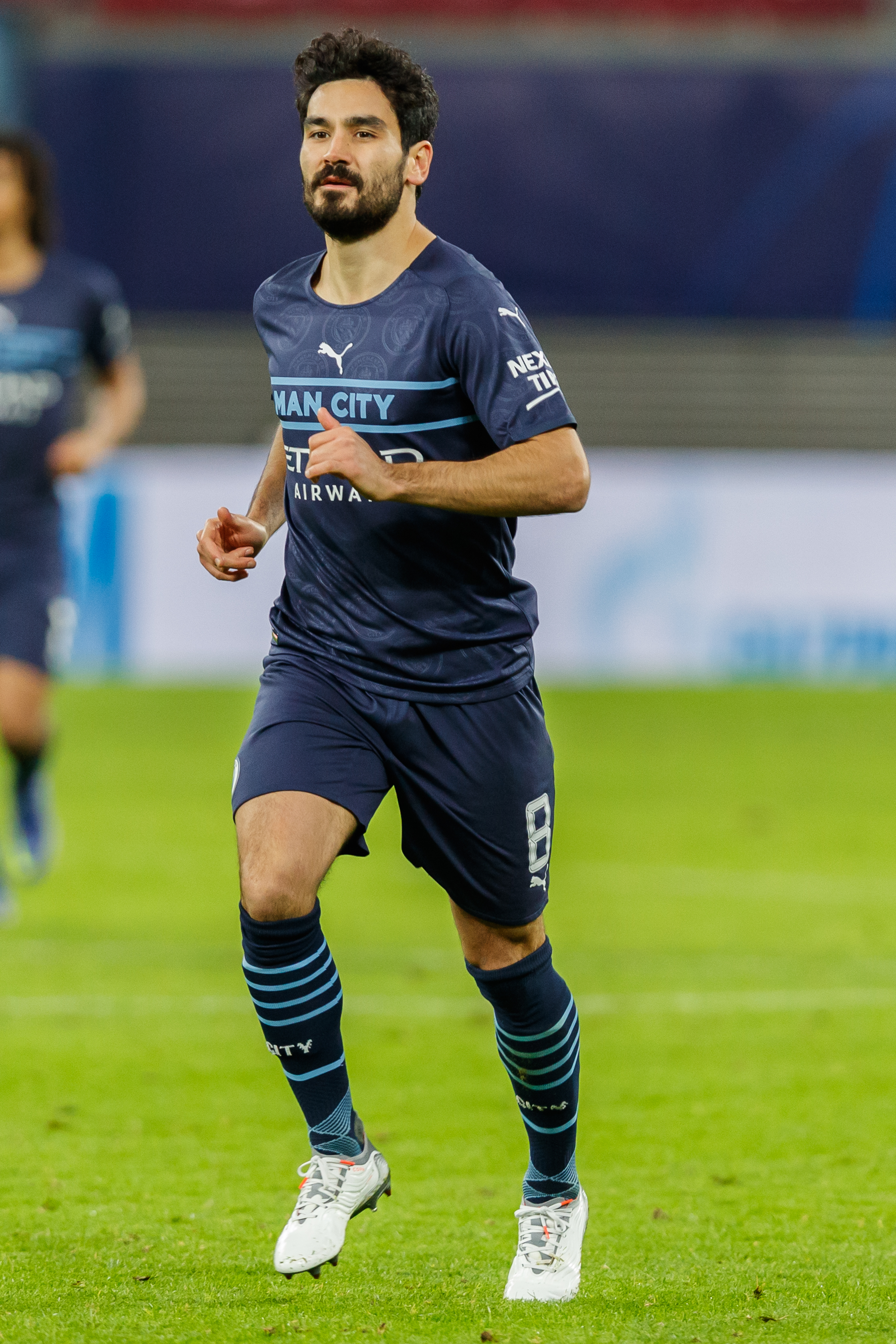
Gündoğan playing for Manchester City in 2021

On 16 September 2017, Gündoğan made his first appearance for Manchester City in nine months, coming on as a substitute in the team's 6–0 2017–18 Premier League win away at Watford. Three months later, he scored his first goal of the season with a header, assisted by Leroy Sané, a goal that gave City the lead in their 4–1 win against Tottenham Hotspur. On 13 February 2018, he scored a brace, with one goal in each half, as City won 4–0 against FC Basel in the away leg of their round-of-sixteen tie in the 2017–18 Champions League. On 4 March, he set two Premier League passing records in a 1–0 home win over Chelsea: one for most passes attempted (174), and one for most passes completed (167) in a single game. The previous holder of both records had been his former City teammate Yaya Touré, who completed 157 passes from 168 attempts against Stoke City in December 2011.

In August 2019, Gündoğan signed a four-year contract extension with City. On 21 September 2020, he tested positive for COVID-19, which obliged him to self-isolate for ten days. This was announced on the same day that City's first game of the season against Wolverhampton Wanderers was to be played. After recovering, he came back to the squad and scored his first Premier league goal of the season on 15 December in a 1–1 home draw against West Bromwich Albion.

On 7 February 2021, Gündoğan scored twice in a 4–1 away league-win over Liverpool, sealing City's first win at Anfield since 2003. On 12 February, he received the Premier League Player of the Month award for his performances throughout January. On 12 March, he received the award for a second consecutive month, with four goals and one assist in five games. In doing so, he became the first player for City to win back-to-back awards for the club. He was City's highest goalscorer of the league season with 13 goals. On 29 May, he played in the 2021 Champions League final, which ended in a 1–0 defeat against Chelsea. On 22 May 2022, he scored two goals in a 3–2 home victory against Aston Villa on the final day of the 2021–22 Premier League, a result that secured a sixth Premier League title for the club.

==== 2022–2023: Treble-winning captain and initial farewell ====
Gündoğan was chosen by his teammates as club captain on 14 August 2022, replacing the departing Fernandinho. On 6 May 2023, he scored both goals in a 2–1 win over Leeds United, which secured his club's 10th league win in a row during the 2022–23 Premier League. On 14 May, Gündoğan scored twice against Everton, one of his goals being a clever flick and the other being a well-taken free kick. Guardiola commented that the player had shown "again and again his quality and his importance". Such performances contributed greatly to City eventually winning in the league title.

On 3 June 2023, Gündoğan scored the quickest goal in FA Cup final history, with a long-range volley within 12 seconds of the 2023 final against Manchester United. The match ended as a 2–1 victory for City, with Gündoğan scoring his brace with another volley in the 51st minute. Gündoğan scored a third goal in the 72nd minute, though it was disallowed for offside. Owing to his performance in the match, he was praised as "magnificent" by journalist Phil McNulty, and was voted as man of the match by readers of BBC Sport. Amidst rumours of potential exits to Barcelona or Arsenal, Guardiola restated his belief that Gündoğan should stay, saying that the director of football for Manchester City, Txiki Begiristain, was "working on" a new contract for the midfielder. On 10 June, he won his first Champions League title after a 1–0 victory over Inter Milan in the final, becoming the first captain of the club to lift the European Cup. On 26 June, City announced the departure of Gündoğan after seven years.

=== Barcelona ===
On 26 June 2023, Gündoğan signed for La Liga club Barcelona on a two-year contract on a free transfer. He scored his first goal for Barcelona on 28 October in the sixth minute against Real Madrid, becoming the second oldest player to score for the club in an El Clásico fixture, aged 33 years and 4 days, only behind Sergio Agüero.

=== Return to Manchester City ===
On 23 August 2024, after spending a single season away from the club, Gündoğan rejoined Manchester City, signing a one-year deal. Later that year, on 23 October, he featured in his 100th Champions League match in a 5–0 victory over Sparta Prague. On 25 May 2025, Gündoğan scored his first Premier League goal since returning to the club in a 2–0 victory against Fulham on the final day of the season. On 22 June, he scored a brace in City's 6–0 win against Al Ain in the FIFA Club World Cup group stage.

=== Galatasaray ===
On 2 September 2025, Gündoğan joined Süper Lig club Galatasaray on a free transfer, signing a two-year deal. A month later, on 4 October, he netted his first goal in a 1–1 draw with Beşiktaş.

== International career ==
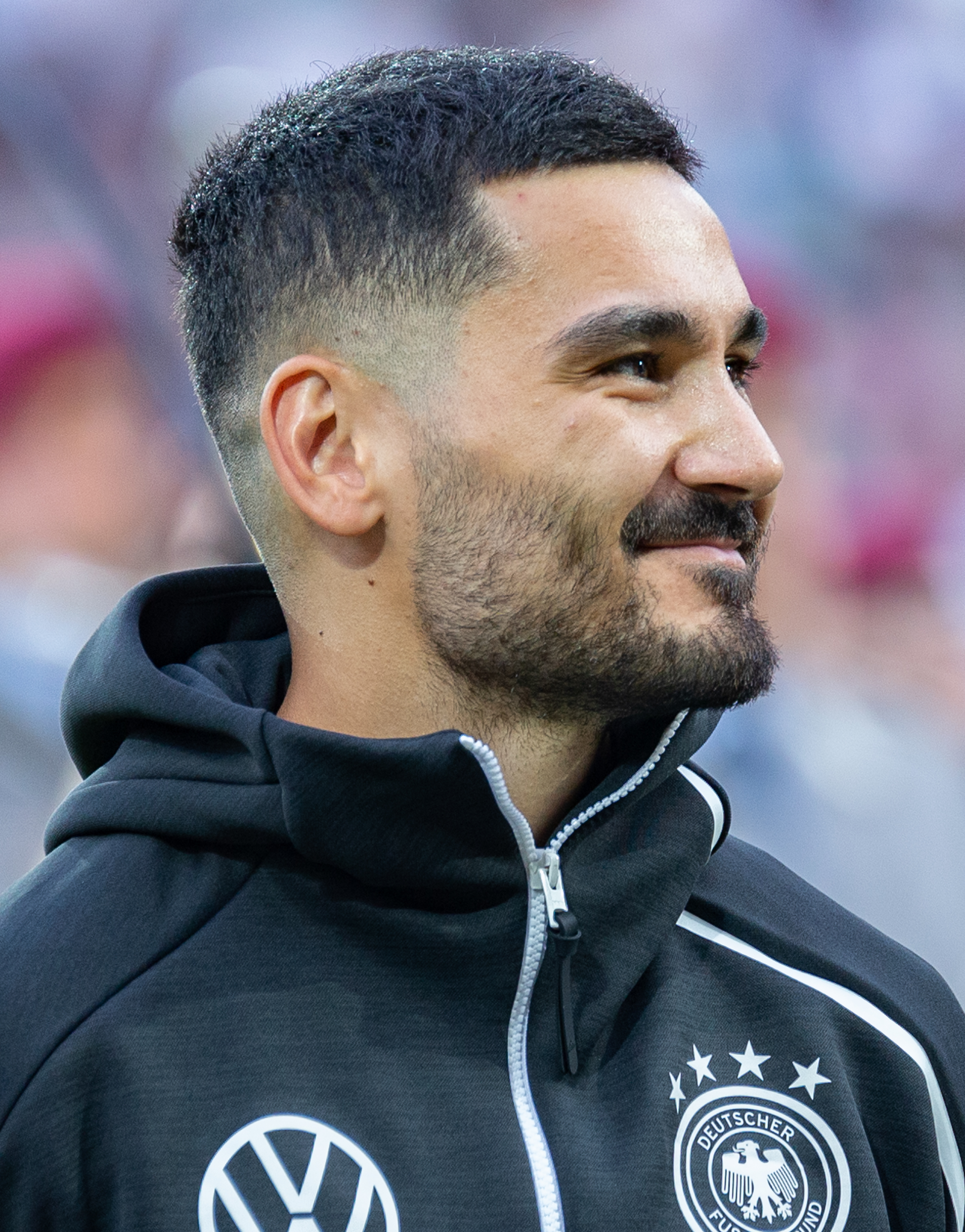
Gündoğan lining up for Germany in 2019

After years of playing for different youth teams, Gündoğan received his first call-up to the Germany senior team in August 2011 for a friendly match against Brazil, but did not feature in the game. On 11 October, he made his debut for Germany after coming on as a substitute for captain Philipp Lahm for the last six minutes of a 3–1 victory against Belgium in a UEFA Euro 2012 qualifying match at the Esprit Arena in Düsseldorf.

In May 2012, he was selected in the German squad for Euro 2012. Germany reached the semi-finals, although Gündoğan did not play. On 26 March 2013, Gündoğan scored his first goal for Germany in a 4–1 2014 FIFA World Cup qualifier against Kazakhstan at the Grundig Stadion in Nuremberg. He scored his second goal in his next match, a friendly on 14 August at the Fritz-Walter-Stadion in Kaiserslautern, as Germany came from 2–0 down to draw 3–3 against Paraguay. However, he was taken off with a back injury that ruled him out for the next year and forced him to miss the 2014 World Cup, which Germany would go on to win.

Gündoğan returned to international football on 25 March 2015 in a 2–2 draw with Australia in a friendly. He participated in the Euro 2016 qualifying campaign, scoring in a 7–0 away victory against Gibraltar on 14 June 2015, and a 3–2 win against Scotland at Hampden Park on 7 September. On 6 May 2016, it was announced Gündoğan would be unable to participate at Euro 2016 due to injury. He made the team's squad, announced in June 2018, for the 2018 World Cup in Russia. On 19 May 2021, he was selected to the squad for UEFA Euro 2020.

On 10 November 2022, Gündoğan was selected in the 26-man squad for the 2022 FIFA World Cup in Qatar. In Germany's opening match of the tournament against Japan, Gündoğan scored a penalty to give Germany a 1–0 lead, but Japan went on to win 2–1. Due to the absence of Manuel Neuer, he was named captain of the national team by coach Hansi Flick in September 2023. After the return of Neuer from injury, new coach Julian Nagelsmann confirmed that Gündogǎn would retain the captaincy, with Joshua Kimmich and Thomas Müller serving as the team's vice-captains.

Gündoğan was named in Germany's squad for UEFA Euro 2024. On 14 June, he captained Germany to a 5–1 victory against Scotland in the opening match of Euro 2024 in Munich. This made him the first German footballer of Turkish descent to serve as captain of the national team at a major tournament finals. On 19 June, Gündoğan was awarded Player of the Match in a 2–0 victory against Hungary, in which he scored a goal and provided an assist, securing his country's qualification to the knockout phase. On 19 August 2024, Gündoğan announced his retirement from international football.

== Style of play ==
Known for his vision, athleticism and leadership, Gündoğan's Manchester City manager, Pep Guardiola, described him as "one of the best players [he had] worked with". Jürgen Klopp, Gündoğan's former coach at Borussia Dortmund, has described Gündoğan as an "intelligent and complete midfielder with numerous strengths". Although Gündoğan had a tough start at Dortmund, where he admitted "things hadn't gone as well as I had thought", his "willingness to learn" and "great attitude", according to Klopp, allowed him to play a pivotal role in his later career at the club in the deep-lying playmaker role. He was able to fit into Dortmund's "explosive" style "by combining creativity and outstanding passing with the defensive attributes and tireless energy needed".

In his earlier years, Gündoğan was often deployed as a wide midfielder, but later established himself in a more central role at Dortmund. Regarding this positional switch, he commented: "I came to the conclusion that playing wide wasn't my strength. I feel fine playing as a defensive or central midfielder, but I also believe that I can hold my own as a playmaker." In a 2016 UEFA profile, Philip Röber also observed that Gündoğan "excels in possession-based teams and can dictate a side's tempo." At Manchester City, Gündoğan was deployed in a variety of midfield positions, including in a holding role. Although he was not statistically as productive as his other midfield teammates, specifically in terms of the number of goals and assists, he drew praise in the media for his ability to circulate possession and create space for other players. Throughout his career, Gündoğan often struggled with injuries.

== Personal life ==
Gündoğan married Sara Arfaoui in 2022. In 2023, the couple gave birth to a son named Kais. Gündoğan's cousin Naz Aydemir is a volleyball player.

Gündoğan is a Muslim. In May 2018, he met Turkish President Recep Tayyip Erdoğan in London, along with Mesut Özil and Cenk Tosun, two other England-based, German-born players of Turkish descent. Gündoğan was criticised for referring to Erdoğan as "my president", despite not being a citizen of Turkey. The incident caused political controversy in Germany, and Gündoğan was jeered by German fans when playing for the national team weeks later.

Years after leaving Nuremberg, Gündoğan has not lost contact to 1. FC Nürnberg nor the local school where he passed his Abitur in 2011. He recalls those years as some of the best of his professional life, stating: "I had my arguably happiest time as a footballer at the beginning of my career at age 18/19 with 1. FC Nürnberg."

In September 2025, he graduated in the inaugural cohort of students from the PFA Business School, with an award from the University of Portsmouth.

== Career statistics ==
=== Club ===
As of match played 17 May 2026

Appearances and goals by club, season and competition
Club	Season	League			National cup (Note: Includes DFB-Pokal, FA Cup, Copa del Rey, Turkish Cup)		League cup (Note: Includes EFL Cup)		Europe		Other		Total	
Club	Season	Division	Apps	Goals	Apps	Goals	Apps	Goals	Apps	Goals	Apps	Goals	Apps	Goals
VfL Bochum II	2008–09	Regionalliga West	2	1	—		—		—		—		2	1
1. FC Nürnberg	2008–09	2. Bundesliga	1	0	—		—		—		—		1	0
1. FC Nürnberg	2009–10	Bundesliga	22	1	2	1	—		—		2 (Note: Appearances in Bundesliga relegation play-offs)	1	26	3
1. FC Nürnberg	2010–11	Bundesliga	25	5	1	0	—		—		—		26	5
1. FC Nürnberg	Total		48	6	3	1	—		—		2	1	53	8
Borussia Dortmund	2011–12	Bundesliga	28	3	5	1	—		2 (Note: Appearances in UEFA Champions League)	0	1 (Note: Appearance in DFL-Supercup)	0	36	4
Borussia Dortmund	2012–13	Bundesliga	28	3	4	0	—		12	1	1	0	45	4
Borussia Dortmund	2013–14	Bundesliga	1	0	1	0	—		0	0	1	1	3	1
Borussia Dortmund	2014–15	Bundesliga	23	3	4	0	—		6	0	0	0	33	3
Borussia Dortmund	2015–16	Bundesliga	25	1	5	1	—		10 (Note: Appearances in UEFA Europa League)	1	—		40	3
Borussia Dortmund	Total		105	10	19	2	—		30	2	3	1	157	15
Borussia Dortmund II	2011–12	Regionalliga West	1	0	—		—		—		—		1	0
Manchester City	2016–17	Premier League	10	3	0	0	0	0	6	2	—		16	5
Manchester City	2017–18	Premier League	30	4	3	0	6	0	9	2	—		48	6
Manchester City	2018–19	Premier League	31	6	6	0	4	0	8	0	1 (Note: Appearance in FA Community Shield)	0	50	6
Manchester City	2019–20	Premier League	31	2	4	1	5	0	9	2	1	0	50	5
Manchester City	2020–21	Premier League	28	13	4	1	2	0	12	3	—		46	17
Manchester City	2021–22	Premier League	27	8	4	2	1	0	10	0	1	0	43	10
Manchester City	2022–23	Premier League	31	8	3	2	3	0	13	1	1	0	51	11
Manchester City	Total		188	44	24	6	21	0	67	10	4	0	304	60
Barcelona	2023–24	La Liga	36	5	3	0	—		10	0	2 (Note: Appearances in Supercopa de España)	0	51	5
Manchester City	2024–25	Premier League	33	1	6	0	1	0	10	2	4 (Note: Appearances in FIFA Club World Cup)	2	54	5
Galatasaray	2025–26	Süper Lig	24	2	4	0	—		8	0	2 (Note: Appearances in Turkish Super Cup)	0	38	2
Career total			437	69	59	9	22	0	125	14	17	4	660	96

=== International ===
Appearances and goals by national team and year
National team	Year	Apps	Goals
Germany	2011	1	0
Germany	2012	3	0
Germany	2013	4	2
Germany	2015	8	2
Germany	2016	4	0
Germany	2017	2	0
Germany	2018	7	0
Germany	2019	8	3
Germany	2020	5	1
Germany	2021	12	6
Germany	2022	12	3
Germany	2023	7	1
Germany	2024	9	1
Total		82	19

Germany score listed first, score column indicates score after each Gündoğan goal

List of international goals scored by İlkay Gündoğan
No.	Date	Venue	Cap	Opponent	Score	Result	Competition	Ref.
1	26 March 2013	Grundig Stadion, Nuremberg, Germany	7	Kazakhstan	3–0	4–1	2014 FIFA World Cup qualification	
2	14 August 2013	Fritz-Walter-Stadion, Kaiserslautern, Germany	8	Paraguay	1–2	3–3	Friendly	
3	13 June 2015	Estádio Algarve, Faro, Portugal	11	Gibraltar	3–0	7–0	UEFA Euro 2016 qualifying	
4	7 September 2015	Hampden Park, Glasgow, Scotland	13	Scotland	3–2	3–2	UEFA Euro 2016 qualifying	
5	11 June 2019	Opel Arena, Mainz, Germany	33	Estonia	4–0	8–0	UEFA Euro 2020 qualifying	
6	13 October 2019	Lilleküla Stadium, Tallinn, Estonia	35	Estonia	1–0	3–0	UEFA Euro 2020 qualifying	
7	13 October 2019	Lilleküla Stadium, Tallinn, Estonia	35	Estonia	2–0	3–0	UEFA Euro 2020 qualifying	
8	6 September 2020	St. Jakob-Park, Basel, Switzerland	39	Switzerland	1–0	1–1	2020–21 UEFA Nations League A	
9	25 March 2021	MSV-Arena, Duisburg, Germany	43	Iceland	3–0	3–0	2022 FIFA World Cup qualification	
10	31 March 2021	MSV-Arena, Duisburg, Germany	45	North Macedonia	1–1	1–2	2022 FIFA World Cup qualification	
11	7 June 2021	Merkur Spiel-Arena, Düsseldorf, Germany	46	Latvia	2–0	7–1	Friendly	
12	11 November 2021	Volkswagen Arena, Wolfsburg, Germany	53	Liechtenstein	1–0	9–0	2022 FIFA World Cup qualification	
13	14 November 2021	Vazgen Sargsyan Republican Stadium, Yerevan, Armenia	54	Armenia	2–0	4–1	2022 FIFA World Cup qualification	
14	14 November 2021	Vazgen Sargsyan Republican Stadium, Yerevan, Armenia	54	Armenia	3–0	4–1	2022 FIFA World Cup qualification	
15	14 June 2022	Borussia-Park, Mönchengladbach, Germany	60	Italy	2–0	5–2	2022–23 UEFA Nations League A	
16	26 September 2022	Wembley Stadium, London, England	62	England	1–0	3–3	2022–23 UEFA Nations League A	
17	23 November 2022	Khalifa International Stadium, Al Rayyan, Qatar	64	Japan	1–0	1–2	2022 FIFA World Cup	
18	14 October 2023	Pratt & Whitney Stadium, East Hartford, United States	70	United States	1–1	3–1	Friendly	
19	19 June 2024	MHPArena, Stuttgart, Germany	79	Hungary	2–0	2–0	UEFA Euro 2024	

== Honours ==
Borussia Dortmund

- Bundesliga: 2011–12
- DFB-Pokal: 2011–12; runner-up: 2014–15
- DFL-Supercup: 2013
- UEFA Champions League runner-up: 2012–13

Manchester City

- Premier League: 2017–18, 2018–19, 2020–21, 2021–22, 2022–23
- FA Cup: 2018–19, 2022–23; runner-up: 2024–25
- EFL Cup: 2017–18, 2018–19, 2019–20, 2020–21
- FA Community Shield: 2018, 2019
- UEFA Champions League: 2022–23; runner-up: 2020–21

Galatasaray

- Süper Lig: 2025–26

Germany

- UEFA European Championship bronze: 2012

Individual

- UEFA Champions League Squad of the Season: 2020–21
- PFA Premier League Team of the Year: 2020–21
- La Liga Team of the Season: 2023–24
- Bundesliga Team of the Season: 2012–13
- kicker Bundesliga Team of the Season: 2012–13
- ESM Team of the Season: 2012–13, 2020–21
- Premier League Game Changer of the Season: 2021–22
- Footballer of the Year in Germany: 2023
- Premier League Player of the Month: January 2021, February 2021
- Manchester City Goal of the Season: 2022–23
