= Roland Sternisko =

German footballer

Personal information
- Date of birth: 10 April 1988 (age 38)
- Place of birth: Würzburg, Germany
- Position: Defensive midfielder

Youth career
- SV Waldbrunn
- Würzburger Kickers
- 1. FC Schweinfurt 05
- –2007: Würzburger FV

Senior career*
Years	Team	Apps	(Gls)
2007–2009	Würzburger FV	16	(3)
2009–2011	1860 Munich II	60	(7)
2011–2014	SpVgg Unterhaching	33	(3)
- * Club domestic league appearances and goals as of 1 July 2014

Roland Sternisko (born 10 April 1988) is a German former footballer who played as a midfielder. He played in the 3. Liga for SpVgg Unterhaching. Before that, he was at TSV 1860 Munich II.
