= Christian Sauter (footballer) =

German footballer

Personal information
- Date of birth: 11 February 1988 (age 38)
- Place of birth: Bad Saulgau, Germany
- Height: 1.77 m (5 ft 10 in)
- Position: Midfielder

Senior career*
Years	Team	Apps	(Gls)
2006–2008	VfB Stuttgart II	7	(1)
2008	SSV Reutlingen 05	13	(2)
2008–2011	SSV Ulm 1846	64	(9)
2011–2014	1. FC Heidenheim	58	(2)
2014–2016	1. FC Saarbrücken	44	(1)
2016–2018	SSV Ulm 1846	53	(3)
- * Club domestic league appearances and goals as of 11 June 2014

Christian Sauter (born 11 February 1988) is a German professional footballer who plays as a midfielder.

== Career ==
Sauter has played for VfB Stuttgart II, SSV Reutlingen 05, SSV Ulm 1846 and 1. FC Heidenheim.
