= Florian Krebs (footballer, born 1988) =

German footballer

Personal information
- Date of birth: 15 November 1988 (age 37)
- Place of birth: Speyer, West Germany
- Height: 1.93 m (6 ft 4 in)
- Position: Centre-back

Youth career
- FC Leimersheim
- –2006: Karlsruher SC

Senior career*
Years	Team	Apps	(Gls)
2006–2009	Karlsruher SC II	71	(3)
2009–2014	1. FC Heidenheim	103	(4)
2014	VfL Osnabrück	6	(0)
2014–2015	Hallescher FC	4	(0)
2015–2021	SSV Ulm	133	(7)
Total		317	(14)
- * Club domestic league appearances and goals

Florian Krebs (born 15 November 1988) is a German former professional footballer who played as a centre-back.
