= 2008–09 Borussia Dortmund season =

2008–09 season of Borussia Dortmund

Borussia Dortmund
2008–09 season
- Manager: Jürgen Klopp
- Bundesliga: 6th
- DFB-Pokal: Round of 16
- UEFA Cup: First round
- Top goalscorer: League: All: Alexander Frei (12)
Home colours	Away colours	Third colours

During the 2008–09 German football season, Borussia Dortmund competed in the Bundesliga.

== Season summary ==
In Jürgen Klopp's first season in charge of Dortmund, they rose to 6th in the final table, but were 2 points shy of qualifying for the revamped UEFA Europa League. Notably, they were one of only two teams to go the league season unbeaten at home (the other being champions Wolfsburg).

== Players ==
=== First-team squad ===
Squad at end of season

Note: Flags indicate national team as defined under FIFA eligibility rules; some limited exceptions apply. Players may hold more than one non-FIFA nationality.

No.	Pos.	Nation	Player
1	GK	GER	Roman Weidenfeller
3	DF	KOR	Lee Young-pyo
4	DF	SRB	Neven Subotić (Note: Subotić was born in Banja Luka, Yugoslavia (now Bosnia and Herzegovina), but was raised in Germany and the United States and also qualified to represent Serbia internationally, and represented the United States at U-17 and U-20 level before making his international debut for Serbia in March 2009.)
5	MF	GER	Sebastian Kehl (captain)
6	MF	GER	Florian Kringe
7	MF	BRA	Tinga
9	FW	PAR	Nelson Valdez
10	FW	EGY	Mohamed Zidan
13	FW	SUI	Alexander Frei
15	DF	GER	Mats Hummels (on loan from Bayern Munich)
16	MF	POL	Jakub Błaszczykowski
17	DF	BRA	Dedê
20	GK	GER	Marc Ziegler

No.	Pos.	Nation	Player
22	MF	GER	Kevin-Prince Boateng (Note: Boateng was born in West Berlin, West Germany, and represented them at U-19, U-20 and U-21 level, but also qualified to represent Ghana internationally through his father and made his international debut for Ghana in June 2010.) (on loan from Tottenham Hotspur)
23	MF	TUR	Nuri Şahin (Note: Şahin was born in Lüdenscheid, Germany, but also qualified to represent Turkey internationally through his parents and represented them at U-16, U-17, U-19 and U-21 level before making his international debut for Turkey in 2005.)
24	DF	GER	Daniel Gordon (Note: Gordon was born in Dortmund, West Germany, but also qualified to represent Jamaica internationally and made his international debut for Jamaica in June 2013.)
25	DF	GER	Patrick Owomoyela
27	DF	BRA	Felipe Santana
29	DF	GER	Marcel Schmelzer
30	MF	HUN	Tamás Hajnal
32	DF	GER	Uwe Hünemeier
34	FW	GER	Bajram Sadrijaj
36	MF	GER	Yasin Öztekin (Note: Öztekin was born in Dortmund, West Germany, but also qualified to represent Turkey internationally and made his international debut for Turkey in June 2015.)
39	FW	GER	Christopher Kullmann
42	MF	BIH	Damir Vrančić (Note: Vrančić was born in Slavonski Brod, Yugoslavia (now Croatia), but also qualified to represent Bosnia and Herzegovina internationally and made his international debut for Bosnia and Herzegovina in May 2012.)

=== Left club during season ===
Note: Flags indicate national team as defined under FIFA eligibility rules; some limited exceptions apply. Players may hold more than one non-FIFA nationality.

No.	Pos.	Nation	Player
8	MF	GER	Giovanni Federico (on loan to Karlsruhe)
10	FW	CRO	Mladen Petrić (Note: Petrić was born in Brčko, Yugoslavia (now Bosnia and Herzegovina), but also qualified to represent Croatia internationally and made his international debut for Croatia in November 2001.) (to Hamburg)
11	MF	RSA	Delron Buckley (on loan to Mainz)
14	DF	SRB	Antonio Rukavina (on loan to 1860 Munich)

No.	Pos.	Nation	Player
19	FW	ARG	Diego Klimowicz (to VfL Bochum)
21	DF	CRO	Robert Kovač (Note: Kovač was born in West Berlin, West Germany, but also qualified to represent Croatia internationally through his parents and made his international debut for Croatia in 1999.) (to Dinamo Zagreb)
22	MF	GER	Marc-André Kruska (to Club Brugge)
31	GK	GER	Lukas Kruse (to Augsburg)

== Transfers ==
=== In ===
- Felipe Santana - Figueirense, 16 May, €2,000,000
- Mohamed Zidan - Hamburg, 17 August, €5,000,000 + Mladen Petrić
- Lee Young-pyo - Tottenham Hotspur, 27 August, undisclosed
- Kevin-Prince Boateng - Tottenham Hotspur, 11 January, loan
- Neven Subotić - Mainz, 4 June
- Tamás Hajnal - Karlsruhe, July, €1,300,000
- Patrick Owomoyela - Werder Bremen
- Christopher Kullmann - Magdeburg
- Damir Vrančić - Mainz
- Bajram Sadrijaj - TSG Thannhausen

=== Out ===
- Mladen Petrić - Hamburg, 17 August, part-exchange
- Robert Kovač - Dinamo Zagreb, 29 January, €450,000
- Delron Buckley - Mainz, January, loan
- Giovanni Federico - Karlsruhe, January, loan
- Antonio Rukavina - 1860 Munich, February, loan
- Diego Klimowicz - VfL Bochum, January
- Lukas Kruse - Augsburg, February
- Christopher Nöthe - Rot-Weiß Oberhausen, loan
- Markus Brzenska - MSV Duisburg, loan
- Christian Wörns - retired
- Philipp Degen - released (later joined Liverpool)
- Alexander Bade - released
- Sahr Senesie (Note: Senesie was born in Koindu, Sierra Leone, but also qualified to represent Germany internationally and represented them at U-20 and U-21 level.) - released
- Martin Amedick - Kaiserslautern
- Christian Eggert - FSV Frankfurt
- Marc-André Kruska - Club Brugge

== Competitions ==
=== Bundesliga ===
==== League table ====
Pos	Team	Pld	W	D	L	GF	GA	GD	Pts	Qualification or relegation
4	Hertha BSC	34	19	6	9	48	41	+7	63	Qualification to Europa League play-off round
5	Hamburger SV	34	19	4	11	49	47	+2	61	Qualification to Europa League third qualifying round
6	Borussia Dortmund	34	15	14	5	60	37	+23	59	
7	1899 Hoffenheim	34	15	10	9	63	49	+14	55	
8	Schalke 04	34	14	8	12	47	35	+12	50	

Source: kicker (in German)
Rules for classification: 1) points; 2) goal difference; 3) number of goals scored.
