= 2010–11 Borussia Dortmund season =

2010–11 season of Borussia Dortmund

Borussia Dortmund
2010–11 season
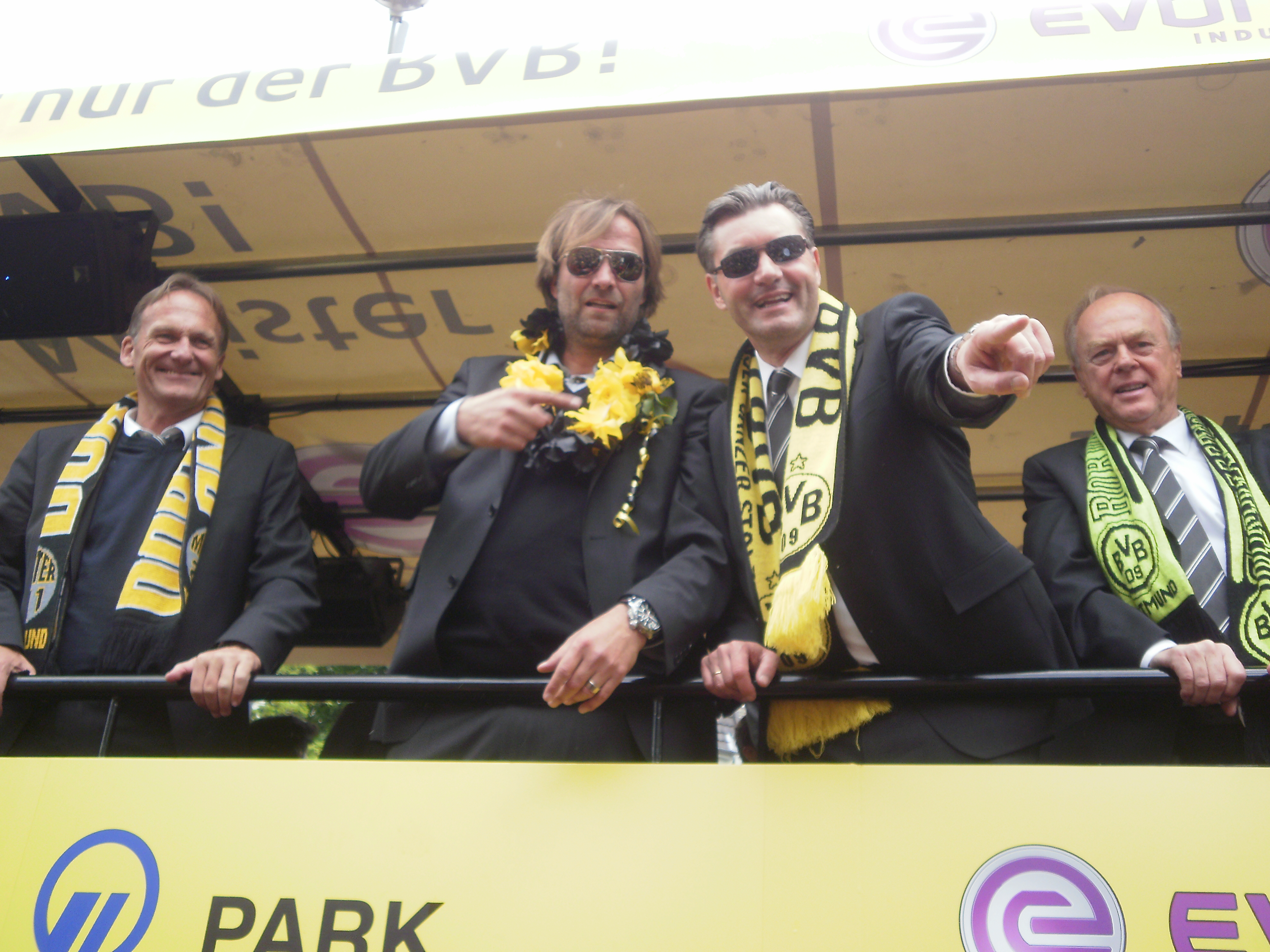
- Jürgen Klopp (second from left) celebrating the club's title win
- President: Reinhard Rauball
- Head coach: Jürgen Klopp
- Bundesliga: 1st
- DFB-Pokal: Second round
- UEFA Europa League: Group stage
- Top goalscorer: League: Lucas Barrios (16); All: Lucas Barrios (21)
| Home colours | Away colours | Third colours |

The 2010–11 Borussia Dortmund season began on 14 August 2010 with a DFB-Pokal match against Wacker Burghausen, and ended on 14 May 2011, the last matchday of the Bundesliga, with a match against Eintracht Frankfurt.

Dortmund were eliminated in the second round of the DFB-Pokal and in the group stage of the UEFA Europa League. Dortmund were crowned league champions on 30 April 2011, two weeks before the final matches were played.

== Season ==
In March 2011, three suspected explosive devices were discovered and defused or made safe near Borussia Dortmund's stadium, Signal Iduna Park. German police arrested a 25-year-old man in Cologne after he was found to have sent anonymous tips to the police about planned attacks.

The final match against Eintracht Frankfurt was oversubscribed. Up until March 31, the club have received 301,752 requests for tickets, in addition to their 50,000 season-ticket holders. Borussia Dortmund set a deadline of 10 April for applications for the game. A ballot determined who got the final 21,000 tickets.

== Transfers ==
=== Summer transfers ===
In:

| No. | Pos. | Nation | Player |
|---|---|---|---|
| 2 | DF | GER | Lasse Sobiech (from Borussia Dortmund U-19) |
| 6 | MF | GER | Florian Kringe (loan return from Hertha BSC) |
| 7 | FW | POL | Robert Lewandowski (from Lech Poznań) |
| 20 | GK | AUS | Mitchell Langerak (from Melbourne Victory) |
| 23 | MF | JPN | Shinji Kagawa (from Cerezo Osaka) |
| 26 | MF | POL | Łukasz Piszczek (from Hertha BSC) |
| 28 | FW | GER | Daniel Ginczek (from Borussia Dortmund U-19) |
| 32 | MF | BRA | Antônio da Silva (from Karlsruher SC) |
| 39 | FW | GER | Marco Stiepermann (from Borussia Dortmund U-19) |
| 44 | DF | GER | Marc Hornschuh (from Borussia Dortmund U-19) |

Out:

| No. | Pos. | Nation | Player |
|---|---|---|---|
| 7 | MF | BRA | Tinga (to Internacional) |
| 9 | FW | PAR | Nelson Valdez (to Hércules) |
| 20 | GK | GER | Marc Ziegler (to VfB Stuttgart) |
| 21 | DF | GER | Uwe Hünemeier (to Energie Cottbus) |
| 28 | MF | POL | Sebastian Tyrała (to VfL Osnabrück) |
| 33 | MF | GER | David Vržogić (to Rot-Weiss Ahlen) |
| 34 | FW | GER | Bajram Sadrijaj (released) |
| 39 | FW | GER | Christopher Kullmann (to Borussia Dortmund II) |
| 40 | GK | GER | Marcel Höttecke (to Union Berlin) |
| 45 | MF | GER | Julian Koch (on loan to MSV Duisburg) |

=== Winter transfers ===
In:

| No. | Pos. | Nation | Player |
|---|---|---|---|
| -- | MF | GER | Moritz Leitner (from 1860 Munich) |

Out:

| No. | Pos. | Nation | Player |
|---|---|---|---|
| 30 | MF | HUN | Tamás Hajnal (on loan to VfB Stuttgart) |
| 36 | MF | TUR | Yasin Öztekin (to Gençlerbirliği) |
| -- | MF | GER | Moritz Leitner (on loan to FC Augsburg) |

== Statistics ==
=== Goals and appearances ===
| No. | Pos | Nat | Player | Total | | Bundesliga | | UEFA Europa League | | DFB-Pokal | |
| No. | Pos | Nat | Player | Apps | Goals | Apps | Goals | Apps | Goals | Apps | Goals |
|---|---|---|---|---|---|---|---|---|---|---|---|
| 1 | GK | (Germany) GER | Roman Weidenfeller | 43 | 0 | 33 | 0 | 8 | 0 | 2 | 0 |
| 2 | DF | (Germany) GER | Lasse Sobiech | 0 | 0 | 0 | 0 | 0 | 0 | 0 | 0 |
| 4 | DF | (Serbia) SRB | Neven Subotić | 41 | 3 | 31 | 1 | 8 | 1 | 2 | 1 |
| 5 | MF | (Germany) GER | Sebastian Kehl (C) | 9 | 0 | 6 | 0 | 2 | 0 | 1 | 0 |
| 6 | MF | (Germany) GER | Florian Kringe | 0 | 0 | 0 | 0 | 0 | 0 | 0 | 0 |
| 7 | FW | (Poland) POL | Robert Lewandowski | 43 | 9 | 33 | 8 | 8 | 1 | 2 | 0 |
| 8 | MF | (Turkey) TUR | Nuri Şahin | 40 | 7 | 30 | 6 | 8 | 1 | 2 | 0 |
| 10 | FW | (Egypt) EGY | Mohamed Zidan | 9 | 0 | 8 | 0 | 1 | 0 | 0 | 0 |
| 13 | FW | (France) FRA | Damien Le Tallec | 3 | 0 | 0 | 0 | 2 | 0 | 1 | 0 |
| 14 | MF | (Germany) GER | Markus Feulner | 9 | 1 | 6 | 1 | 2 | 0 | 1 | 0 |
| 15 | DF | (Germany) GER | Mats Hummels | 42 | 6 | 32 | 5 | 8 | 1 | 2 | 0 |
| 16 | MF | (Poland) POL | Jakub Błaszczykowski | 38 | 3 | 29 | 3 | 8 | 0 | 1 | 0 |
| 17 | DF | (Brazil) BRA | Dedé | 5 | 0 | 4 | 0 | 1 | 0 | 0 | 0 |
| 18 | FW | (Paraguay) PAR | Lucas Barrios | 41 | 21 | 32 | 16 | 7 | 4 | 2 | 1 |
| 19 | FW | (Germany) GER | Kevin Großkreutz | 43 | 9 | 34 | 8 | 7 | 0 | 2 | 1 |
| 20 | GK | (Australia) AUS | Mitchell Langerak | 1 | 0 | 1 | 0 | 0 | 0 | 0 | 0 |
| 22 | MF | (Germany) GER | Sven Bender | 39 | 1 | 31 | 1 | 7 | 0 | 1 | 0 |
| 23 | MF | (Japan) JPN | Shinji Kagawa | 28 | 12 | 18 | 8 | 8 | 4 | 2 | 0 |
| 25 | DF | (Germany) GER | Patrick Owomoyela | 10 | 0 | 6 | 0 | 3 | 0 | 1 | 0 |
| 26 | DF | (Poland) POL | Łukasz Piszczek | 41 | 0 | 33 | 0 | 7 | 0 | 1 | 0 |
| 27 | DF | (Brazil) BRA | Felipe Santana | 13 | 0 | 13 | 0 | 0 | 0 | 0 | 0 |
| 28 | FW | (Germany) GER | Daniel Ginczek | 0 | 0 | 0 | 0 | 0 | 0 | 0 | 0 |
| 29 | DF | (Germany) GER | Marcel Schmelzer | 43 | 0 | 34 | 0 | 7 | 0 | 2 | 0 |
| 30 | MF | (Hungary) HUN | Tamás Hajnal | 0 | 0 | 0 | 0 | 0 | 0 | 0 | 0 |
| 31 | MF | (Germany) GER | Mario Götze | 41 | 8 | 33 | 6 | 6 | 2 | 2 | 0 |
| 32 | MF | (Brazil) BRA | Antônio da Silva | 27 | 1 | 22 | 1 | 4 | 0 | 1 | 0 |
| 39 | FW | (Germany) GER | Marco Stiepermann | 4 | 0 | 4 | 0 | 0 | 0 | 0 | 0 |
| 41 | GK | (Germany) GER | Johannes Focher | 0 | 0 | 0 | 0 | 0 | 0 | 0 | 0 |
| 44 | DF | (Germany) GER | Marc Hornschuh | 0 | 0 | 0 | 0 | 0 | 0 | 0 | 0 |

Last updated: 14 May 2011

== Competitions ==
Win Draw Loss

=== Bundesliga ===
==== League table ====
| Pos | Team | Pld | W | D | L | GF | GA | GD | Pts | Qualification or relegation |
|---|---|---|---|---|---|---|---|---|---|---|
| 1 | Borussia Dortmund (C) | 34 | 23 | 6 | 5 | 67 | 22 | +45 | 75 | Qualification to Champions League group stage |
| 2 | Bayer Leverkusen | 34 | 20 | 8 | 6 | 64 | 44 | +20 | 68 | Qualification to Champions League group stage |
| 3 | Bayern Munich | 34 | 19 | 8 | 7 | 81 | 40 | +41 | 65 | Qualification to Champions League play-off round |
| 4 | Hannover 96 | 34 | 19 | 3 | 12 | 49 | 45 | +4 | 60 | Qualification to Europa League play-off round |
| 5 | FSV Mainz 05 | 34 | 18 | 4 | 12 | 52 | 39 | +13 | 58 | Qualification to Europa League third qualifying round |

Source: kicker
Rules for classification: 1) points; 2) goal difference; 3) number of goals scored.
(C) Champions

==== Matches ====
| 22 August 2010 1 | Borussia Dortmund | 0–2 | Bayer Leverkusen | Dortmund |
| 17:30 | | Report | Barnetta 19'; Augusto 22' | Stadium: Signal Iduna Park; Attendance: 73,300; Referee: Florian Meyer |

| 29 August 2010 2 | Stuttgart | 1–3 | Borussia Dortmund | Stuttgart |
| 17:30 | Cacau 69' | Report | Boulahrouz 5' (o.g.); Barrios 26'; Götze 37' | Stadium: Mercedes-Benz Arena; Attendance: 40,500; Referee: Peter Gagelmann |

| 11 September 2010 3 | Borussia Dortmund | 2–0 | VfL Wolfsburg | Dortmund |
| 15:30 | Şahin 50'; Kagawa 67' | Report | | Stadium: Signal Iduna Park; Attendance: 73,600; Referee: Deniz Aytekin |

| 19 September 2010 4 | Schalke 04 | 1–3 | Borussia Dortmund | Gelsenkirchen |
| 17:30 | Huntelaar 89' | Report | Kagawa 20', 58'; Lewandowski 86' | Stadium: Veltins-Arena; Attendance: 60,069; Referee: Manuel Gräfe |

| 22 September 2010 5 | Borussia Dortmund | 5–0 | 1. FC Kaiserslautern | Dortmund |
| 20:00 | Barrios 31', 88'; Großkreutz 38'; Hummels 65'; Lewandowski 75' | Report | | Stadium: Signal Iduna Park; Attendance: 70,100; Referee: Marco Fritz |

| 25 September 2010 6 | FC St. Pauli | 1–3 | Borussia Dortmund | St. Pauli |
| 15:30 | Hennings 26' | Report | Großkreutz 17', 60'; Kagawa 50' | Stadium: Millerntor-Stadion; Attendance: 24,082; Referee: Wolfgang Stark |

| 3 October 2010 7 | Borussia Dortmund | 2–0 | Bayern Munich | Dortmund |
| 17:30 | Barrios 52'; Şahin 60' | Report | | Stadium: Signal Iduna Park; Attendance: 80,720; Referee: Florian Meyer |

| 15 October 2010 8 | 1. FC Köln | 1–2 | Borussia Dortmund | Cologne |
| 20:30 | Podolski 82' | Report | Błaszczykowski 20'; Şahin 90+1' | Stadium: RheinEnergieStadion; Attendance: 50,000; Referee: Günter Perl |

| 24 October 2010 9 | Borussia Dortmund | 1–1 | 1899 Hoffenheim | Dortmund |
| 15:30 | Da Silva 90+3' | Report | Ba 9' | Stadium: Signal Iduna Park; Attendance: 80,720; Referee: Wolfgang Stark |

| 31 October 2010 10 | Mainz 05 | 0–2 | Borussia Dortmund | Mainz |
| 15:30 | | Report | Götze 26'; Barrios 67' | Stadium: Coface Arena; Attendance: 20,300; Referee: Michael Weiner |

| 7 November 2010 11 | Hannover 96 | 0–4 | Borussia Dortmund | Hanover |
| 15:30 | | Report | Kagawa 11'; Barrios 72'; Lewandowski 81'; Błaszczykowski 90+1' | Stadium: AWD-Arena; Attendance: 49,000; Referee: Felix Brych |

| 12 November 2010 12 | Borussia Dortmund | 2–0 | Hamburger SV | Dortmund |
| 20:30 | Kagawa 49'; Barrios 70' | Report | | Stadium: Signal Iduna Park; Attendance: 80,720; Referee: Deniz Aytekin |

| 20 November 2010 13 | SC Freiburg | 1–2 | Borussia Dortmund | Freiburg |
| 15:30 | Hummels 27' (o.g.) | Report | Lewandowski 75'; Mujdža 79' (o.g.) | Stadium: Mage Solar Stadion; Attendance: 24,000; Referee: Marco Fritz |

| 27 November 2010 14 | Borussia Dortmund | 4–1 | Borussia Mönchengladbach | Dortmund |
| 18:30 | Subotić 45+1'; Kagawa 52'; Großkreutz 77'; Barrios 88' | Report | Reus 33' | Stadium: Signal Iduna Park; Attendance: 79,200; Referee: Manuel Gräfe |

| 5 December 2010 15 | 1. FC Nürnberg | 0–2 | Borussia Dortmund | Nuremberg |
| 17:30 | | Report | Hummels 23'; Lewandowski 88' | Stadium: Frankenstadion; Attendance: 48,548; Referee: Michael Weiner |

| 11 December 2010 16 | Borussia Dortmund | 2–0 | Werder Bremen | Dortmund |
| 18:30 | Şahin 9'; Kagawa 70' | Report | | Stadium: Signal Iduna Park; Attendance: 80,720; Referee: Florian Meyer |

| 18 December 2010 17 | Eintracht Frankfurt | 1–0 | Borussia Dortmund | Frankfurt |
| 15:30 | Gekas 87' | Report | | Stadium: Commerzbank-Arena; Attendance: 51,500; Referee: Deniz Aytekin |

| 14 January 2011 18 | Bayer Leverkusen | 1–3 | Borussia Dortmund | Leverkusen |
| 20:30 | Kießling 80' | Report | Großkreutz 49', 53'; Götze 55' | Stadium: BayArena; Attendance: 30,210; Referee: Peter Gagelmann |

| 22 January 2011 19 | Borussia Dortmund | 1–1 | VfB Stuttgart | Dortmund |
| 15:30 | Götze 43' | Report | Pogrebnyak 84' | Stadium: Signal Iduna Park; Attendance: 80,720; Referee: Felix Brych |

| 29 January 2011 20 | VfL Wolfsburg | 0–3 | Borussia Dortmund | Wolfsburg |
| 15:30 | | Report | Barrios 2'; Şahin 40'; Hummels 71' | Stadium: Volkswagen Arena; Attendance: 30,000; Referee: Knut Kircher |

| 4 February 2011 21 | Borussia Dortmund | 0–0 | Schalke 04 | Dortmund |
| 20:30 | | Report | | Stadium: Signal Iduna Park; Attendance: 80,720; Referee: Michael Weiner |

| 12 February 2011 22 | 1. FC Kaiserslautern | 1–1 | Borussia Dortmund | Kaiserslautern |
| 18:30 | Morávek 90' | Report | Bender 82' | Stadium: Fritz-Walter-Stadion; Attendance: 49,780; Referee: Florian Meyer |

| 19 February 2011 23 | Borussia Dortmund | 2–0 | FC St. Pauli | Dortmund |
| 15:30 | Barrios 39'; Gunesch 49' (o.g.) | Report | | Stadium: Signal Iduna Park; Attendance: 80,720; Referee: Peter Sippel |

| 26 February 2011 24 | Bayern Munich | 1–3 | Borussia Dortmund | Munich |
| 18:30 | Luiz Gustavo 16' | Report | Barrios 9'; Şahin 18'; Hummels 60' | Stadium: Allianz Arena; Attendance: 69,000; Referee: Manuel Gräfe |

| 4 March 2011 25 | Borussia Dortmund | 1–0 | 1. FC Köln | Dortmund |
| 20:30 | Lewandowski 44' | Report | | Stadium: Signal Iduna Park; Attendance: 80,720; Referee: Günter Perl |

| 12 March 2011 26 | 1899 Hoffenheim | 1–0 | Borussia Dortmund | Sinsheim |
| 15:30 | Ibišević 63' | Report | | Stadium: Rhein-Neckar Arena; Attendance: 30,150; Referee: Jochen Drees |

| 19 March 2011 27 | Borussia Dortmund | 1–1 | Mainz 05 | Dortmund |
| 18:30 | Hummels 8' | Report | Slišković 89' | Stadium: Signal Iduna Park; Attendance: 80,720; Referee: Felix Brych |

| 2 April 2011 28 | Borussia Dortmund | 4–1 | Hannover 96 | Dortmund |
| 15:30 | Götze 59'; Barrios 64', 73'; Großkreutz 83' | Report | Abdellaoue 57' | Stadium: Signal Iduna Park; Attendance: 80,720; Referee: Manuel Gräfe |

| 9 April 2011 29 | Hamburger SV | 1–1 | Borussia Dortmund | Hamburg |
| 15:30 | Van Nistelrooy 39' (pen.) | Report | Błaszczykowski 90+2' | Stadium: Imtech Arena; Attendance: 57,000; Referee: Peter Gagelmann |

| 17 April 2011 30 | Borussia Dortmund | 3–0 | SC Freiburg | Dortmund |
| 17:30 | Götze 23'; Lewandowski 43'; Großkreutz 78' | Report | | Stadium: Signal Iduna Park; Attendance: 80,720; Referee: Felix Zwayer |

| 23 April 2011 31 | Borussia Mönchengladbach | 1–0 | Borussia Dortmund | Mönchengladbach |
| 18:30 | Idrissou 35' | Report | | Stadium: Borussia-Park; Attendance: 54,057; Referee: Wolfgang Stark |

| 30 April 2011 32 | Borussia Dortmund | 2–0 | 1. FC Nürnberg | Dortmund |
| 15:30 | Barrios 32'; Lewandowski 43' | Report | | Stadium: Signal Iduna Park; Attendance: 80,720; Referee: Markus Schmidt |

| 7 May 2011 33 | Werder Bremen | 2–0 | Borussia Dortmund | Bremen |
| 15:30 | Silvestre 6'; Pizarro 63' | Report | | Stadium: Weserstadion; Attendance: 40,600; Referee: Günter Perl |

| 14 May 2011 34 | Borussia Dortmund | 3–1 | Eintracht Frankfurt | Dortmund |
| 15:30 | Barrios 68', 90'; Russ 73' (o.g.) | Report | Rode 46' | Stadium: Signal Iduna Park; Attendance: 80,720; Referee: Peter Gagelmann |

=== DFB-Pokal ===
| 14 August 2010 Round 1 | Wacker Burghausen | 0–3 | Borussia Dortmund | Burghausen |
| 15:30 CEST (UTC+02:00) | | | Barrios 5'; Subotić 14'; Großkreutz 48' | Stadium: Wacker Arena; Attendance: 10,000; Referee: Marco Fritz |

| 27 October 2010 Round 2 | Kickers Offenbach | 0–0 (a.e.t.) (4–2 p) | Borussia Dortmund | Offenbach am Main |
| 20:30 CEST (UTC+02:00) | | | | Stadium: Stadion am Bieberer Berg; Attendance: 25,000; Referee: Knut Kircher |
| | Penalties |
| | Haas (penalty missed); Feldhahn (penalty scored); Kopilas (penalty scored); Rathgeber (penalty scored); Mehić (penalty scored) | | (penalty scored) Şahin; (penalty missed) Barrios; (penalty scored) Le Tallec; (penalty missed) Lewandowski |

=== UEFA Europa League ===
==== Play-off round ====
| 19 August 2010 First Leg | Borussia Dortmund (Germany) | 4–0 | (Azerbaijan) Qarabağ | Dortmund, Germany |
| 21:05 CEST (UTC+02:00) | Kagawa 13', 41'; Barrios 21', 29' | Report | | Stadium: Signal Iduna Park; Attendance: 47,800; Referee: Cristian Balaj (Romania) |

| 26 August 2010 Second Leg | Qarabağ (Azerbaijan) | 0–1 (0–5 agg.) | (Germany) Borussia Dortmund | Baku, Azerbaijan |
| 21:05 CEST (UTC+02:00) | | Report | Barrios 90+1' | Stadium: Tofiq Bahramov Stadium; Attendance: 17,000; Referee: Serge Gumienny (Belgium) |

==== Group stage ====
| Pos | Team | Pld | W | D | L | GF | GA | GD | Pts | Qualification | PSG | SEV | DOR | KAR |
|---|---|---|---|---|---|---|---|---|---|---|---|---|---|---|
| 1 | (France) Paris Saint-Germain | 6 | 3 | 3 | 0 | 9 | 4 | +5 | 12 | Advance to knockout phase | — | 4–2 | 0–0 | 2–0 |
| 2 | (Spain) Sevilla | 6 | 3 | 1 | 2 | 10 | 7 | +3 | 10 | Advance to knockout phase | 0–1 | — | 2–2 | 4–0 |
| 3 | (Germany) Borussia Dortmund | 6 | 2 | 3 | 1 | 10 | 7 | +3 | 9 | | 1–1 | 0–1 | — | 3–0 |
| 4 | (Ukraine) Karpaty Lviv | 6 | 0 | 1 | 5 | 4 | 15 | −11 | 1 | | 1–1 | 0–1 | 3–4 | — |

Source: Soccerway

| 16 September 2010 1 | Karpaty Lviv (Ukraine) | 3–4 | (Germany) Borussia Dortmund | Lviv, Ukraine |
| 21:05 CEST (UTC+02:00) | Holodyuk 44'; Kopolovets 52'; Kozhanov 78' | Report | Şahin 12' (pen.); Götze 27', 90+2'; Barrios 87' | Stadium: Ukraina Stadium; Attendance: 27,700; Referee: Claudio Circhetta (Switzerland) |

| 30 September 2010 2 | Borussia Dortmund (Germany) | 0–1 | (Spain) Sevilla | Dortmund, Germany |
| 19:00 CEST (UTC+02:00) | | Report | Cigarini 45+1' | Stadium: Signal Iduna Park; Attendance: 49,100; Referee: Mike Dean (England) |

| 21 October 2010 3 | Borussia Dortmund (Germany) | 1–1 | (France) Paris Saint-Germain | Dortmund, Germany |
| 19:00 CEST (UTC+02:00) | Şahin 50' (pen.) | Report | Chantôme 87' | Stadium: Signal Iduna Park; Attendance: 50,200; Referee: Jonas Eriksson (Sweden) |

| 4 November 2010 4 | Paris Saint-Germain (France) | 0–0 | (Germany) Borussia Dortmund | Paris, France |
| 21:05 CET (UTC+01:00) | | Report | | Stadium: Parc des Princes; Attendance: 27,700; Referee: Pavel Královec (Czech Republic) |

| 2 December 2010 5 | Borussia Dortmund (Germany) | 3–0 | (Ukraine) Karpaty Lviv | Dortmund, Germany |
| 19:00 CET (UTC+01:00) | Kagawa 5'; Hummels 49'; Lewandowski 89' | Report | | Stadium: Signal Iduna Park; Attendance: 40,100; Referee: Eric Braamhaar (Netherlands) |

| 15 December 2010 6 | Sevilla (Spain) | 2–2 | (Germany) Borussia Dortmund | Seville, Spain |
| 21:05 CET (UTC+01:00) | Romaric 31'; Kanouté 35' | Report | Kagawa 4'; Subotić 49' | Stadium: Ramón Sánchez Pizjuán Stadium; Attendance: 27,062; Referee: Aleksei Nikolaev (Russia) |

== See also ==
- 2010–11 Bundesliga
- 2010–11 UEFA Europa League
- 2010–11 DFB-Pokal
- Borussia Dortmund
