= Sagers =

Sagers is a surname. Notable people with the surname include:

- Aaron Sagers (born 1977), American television presenter, entertainment journalist, and author
- Douglas Sagers, American politician

== See also ==
- Sager
