= Zagel =

Zagel or Zägel is a surname. Notable people with the surname include:

- Ernst Zägel (1936–2020), German footballer
- James Zagel (1941–2023), American judge

== See also ==
- Sagel
