= 2014–15 FC Schalke 04 season =

Schalke 04
2014–15 season
- President: Clemens Tönnies
- Head coach: Jens Keller (until 7 October 2014); Roberto Di Matteo (from 7 October 2014)
- Stadium: Veltins-Arena
- Bundesliga: 6th
- DFB-Pokal: First round
- UEFA Champions League: Round of 16
- Top goalscorer: League: Klaas-Jan Huntelaar; Eric Maxim Choupo-Moting (9 each); All: Klaas-Jan Huntelaar (14 goals)
Home colours	Away colours	Third colours

The 2014–15 FC Schalke 04 season was the 111th season in the club's football history. In 2014–15 the club played in the Bundesliga, the top tier of German football. It was the club's 23rd consecutive season in the Bundesliga, having been promoted from the 2. Bundesliga in 1991.

Schalke 04 finished third in the previous season, meaning that they automatically qualified for the Group Stage of the UEFA Champions League.

== Background ==
=== Transfers ===
The transfer window started very early for Schalke 04 when they announced the signing of 23-year-old goalkeeper Fabian Giefer on a pre-contract from Fortuna Düsseldorf, who currently play in the 2. Bundesliga. This was the first signing of the new season and Giefer joined up with the squad officially on 1 July 2014.

==== In ====
No.	Pos.	Name	Age	NAT	EU	Moving from	Type	Transfer Window	Contract ends	Transfer fee	Sources
31	DF	Matija Nastasić	21	Serbia	Yes	Manchester City	Loan	Winter	2015	Free	
28	GK	Christian Wetklo	34	Germany	Yes	Darmstadt 98	Transfer	Summer	2015	Free	
13	FW	Eric Maxim Choupo-Moting	25	Germany	Yes	Mainz 05	Transfer	Summer	2017	Free	
34	GK	Fabian Giefer	24	Germany	Yes	Fortuna Düsseldorf	Transfer	Summer	2018	Free	
15	DF	Dennis Aogo	27	Germany	Yes	Hamburger SV	Transfer	Summer	2017	€1,900,000	
18	MF	Sidney Sam	26	Germany	Yes	Bayer Leverkusen	Transfer	Summer	2018	€2,500,000	
40	GK	Timon Wellenreuther	18	Germany	Yes	Youth system	Promoted	Summer	2017	—	
37	MF	Pascal Itter	19	Germany	Yes	Youth system	Promoted	Summer	2017	—	
2	DF	Marvin Friedrich	18	Germany	Yes	Youth system	Promoted	Summer	2017	—	
29	FW	Donis Avdijaj	17	Germany	Yes	Youth system	Promoted	Summer	2019	—	
29	FW	Philipp Hofmann	21	Germany	Yes	FC Ingolstadt	End of loan	Summer	2016	—	
36	GK	Lars Unnerstall	23	Germany	Yes	FC Aarau	End of loan	Summer	2015	—	—
27	MF	Tranquillo Barnetta	29	Switzerland	Yes	Eintracht Frankfurt	End of loan	Summer	2015	—	—

==== Out ====
No.	Pos.	Name	Age	NAT	EU	Moving to	Type	Transfer Window	Transfer fee	Sources
5	DF	Felipe Santana	28	Brazil	No	Olympiacos	Loan	Winter	Free	
30	MF	René Klingenburg	21	Germany	Yes	Viktoria Köln	Transfer	Winter	Free	
29	FW	Donis Avdijaj	18	Germany	Yes	Sturm Graz	Loan	Winter	Free	
11	MF	Christian Clemens	23	Germany	Yes	Mainz 05	Loan	Winter	€400,000	
34	GK	Timo Hildebrand	35	Germany	Yes	Eintracht Frankfurt	Transfer	Summer	Free	
40	MF	Anthony Annan	28	Ghana	No	HJK	Transfer	Summer	Free	
14	DF	Kyriakos Papadopoulos	22	Greece	Yes	Bayer Leverkusen	Loan	Summer	€1,000,000	
28	FW	Ádám Szalai	26	Hungary	Yes	1899 Hoffenheim	Transfer	Summer	€6,000,000	
2	DF	Tim Hoogland	29	Germany	Yes	Fulham	Transfer	Summer	Free	
29	FW	Philipp Hofmann	21	Germany	Yes	1. FC Kaiserslautern	Transfer	Summer	€1,000,000	
36	GK	Lars Unnerstall	23	Germany	Yes	Fortuna Düsseldorf	Transfer	Summer	€200,000	
15	DF	Dennis Aogo	27	Germany	Yes	Hamburger SV	End of loan	Summer	—	—

=== Squad ===
Squad Season 2014–15
No.	Player	Nat.	Age	Birthplace	Previous club
Goalkeepers
1	Ralf Fährmann	Germany	26	Karl-Marx-Stadt	Eintracht Frankfurt
28	Christian Wetklo	Germany	35	Marl	Darmstadt 98
34	Fabian Giefer	Germany	25	Adenau	Fortuna Düsseldorf
40	Timon Wellenreuther	Germany	19	Karlsruhe	Schalke 04 Youth system
Defenders
2	Marvin Friedrich	Germany	19	Kassel	Schalke 04 Youth system
4	Benedikt Höwedes (C)	Germany	27	Haltern	Schalke 04 Youth system
5	Felipe Santana	Brazil	29	Rio Claro, São Paulo	Borussia Dortmund
6	Sead Kolašinac	Bosnia and Herzegovina	21	Karlsruhe	Schalke 04 Youth system
15	Dennis Aogo	Germany	28	Karlsruhe	Hamburger SV
22	Atsuto Uchida	Japan	27	Kannami, Shizuoka	Kashima Antlers
23	Christian Fuchs	Austria	29	Neunkirchen	Mainz 05
24	Kaan Ayhan	Turkey	20	Gelsenkirchen	Schalke 04 Youth system
31	Matija Nastasić	Serbia	22	Valjevo	Manchester City
32	Joël Matip	Cameroon	23	Bochum	Schalke 04 Youth system
Midfielders
3	Jan Kirchhoff	Germany	24	Frankfurt	Bayern Munich
7	Max Meyer	Germany	19	Oberhausen	Schalke 04 Youth system
8	Leon Goretzka	Germany	20	Bochum	VfL Bochum
9	Kevin-Prince Boateng	Ghana	28	Berlin	Milan
10	Julian Draxler	Germany	21	Gladbeck	Schalke 04 Youth system
11	Christian Clemens	Germany	23	Cologne	1. FC Köln
12	Marco Höger	Germany	25	Cologne	Alemannia Aachen
17	Jefferson Farfán	Peru	30	Lima	PSV
18	Sidney Sam	Germany	27	Kiel	Bayer Leverkusen
19	Leroy Sané	Germany	19	Essen	Schalke 04 Youth system
27	Tranquillo Barnetta	Switzerland	30	St. Gallen	Eintracht Frankfurt
30	René Klingenburg	Germany	21	Rot-Weiß Oberhausen	Schalke 04 Youth system
33	Roman Neustädter	Russia	27	Dnipropetrovsk	Borussia Mönchengladbach
37	Pascal Itter	Germany	20	Schwalmstadt	Schalke 04 Youth system
Forwards
13	Eric Maxim Choupo-Moting	Cameroon	26	Hamburg	Mainz 05
20	Chinedu Obasi	Nigeria	28	Enugu	1899 Hoffenheim
25	Klaas-Jan Huntelaar	Netherlands	31	Voor-Drempt	Milan
29	Donis Avdijaj	Germany	18	Osnabrück	Schalke 04 Youth system
36	Felix Platte	Germany	19	Höxter	Schalke 04 Youth system
Last updated: 14 February 2015

=== Kits ===
Home	Home Alt.	Away	Away Alt.	Third	2015–16 Third

Type	Shirt	Shorts	Socks	Record						
Type	Shirt	Shorts	Socks	G	W	D	L	GF	GA	GD
Home	Blue	White	Blue	24	11	6	7	33	32	+1
Home Alt.	Blue	Blue	Blue	7	2	2	3	10	12	-2
Away	White	Navy	White	5	2	0	3	6	7	-1
Away Alt.	White	White	White	2	1	0	1	2	2	0
Third	Green	Black	Black	4	0	3	1	5	6	-1
2015–16 Third	Green-Black	Black	Black	1	0	0	1	0	2	-2
				43	16	11	16	56	61	-5
Updated: 23 May 2015

== Friendlies ==
Date	Kickoff	Stadium	City	Opponent	Result	Attendance	Goalscorers		Source
Date	Kickoff	Stadium	City	Opponent	Result	Attendance	Schalke 04	Opponent	Source
Pre-season friendlies
5 July 2014	15:00	Lohrheidestadion	Wattenscheid	DJK TuS Hordel	5–0	2,000	Sam 12'; Höger 20'; Avdijaj 43'; Obasi 55' (pen.); Borgmann 77'	—	
10 July 2014	19:00	Stadion Große Wiese	Arnsberg	HSK-Auswahl	7–0	3,000	Meyer 2', 55'; Obasi 20'; Höger 24', 34'; Avdijaj 65', 75'	—	
19 July 2014	18:00	DKB-Arena	Rostock	Hansa Rostock	3–0	12,500	Sam 69'; Kirchhoff 72'; Hodja 74'	—	
23 July 2014	18:00	Joseph-März-Stadion	Rosenheim	SB/DJK Rosenheim	11–1	2,300	Obasi 2'; Choupo-Moting 8', 26'; Barnetta 10', 32'; Höger 24', 28'; Kolašinac 36'; Meyer 59', 60'; Avdijaj 84'	Aykac 25'	
29 July 2014	18:00	Kufstein-Arena	Kufstein	Stoke City	2–1	4,000	Matip 58'; Barnetta 86'	Bojan 55'	
5 August 2014	19:00	rewirpowerSTADION	Bochum	VfL Bochum	1–1	6,764	Aogo 89'	Gregoritsch 61'	
9 August 2014	18:30 (LT 17:30)	White Hart Lane	London	Tottenham Hotspur	1–2	36,000	Boateng 80'	Adebayor 29'; Soldado 66'	
4 September 2014	18:30	Stadion am Haarwasen	Haiger	Veltins-Auswahl	6–0	4,000	Obasi 47', 55'; Barnetta 50'; Neustädter 56'; Boateng 57'; Kehrer 89'	—	
Mid-season-break friendlies
10 January 2015	15:30 (LT 17:30)	Suheim Bin Hamad Stadium	Doha	Ajax	0–2	300	—	Milik 64'; El Ghazi 90+3'	
15 January 2015	14:00 (LT 16:00)	Aspire Academy, Place 4	Doha	Al-Merrikh SC	2–2	300	Huntelaar 60'; Sané 72'	Gabir 57' (pen.); Mohamed 88'	
24 January 2015	15:30	Ernst Happel Stadium	Vienna	Rapid Wien	1–2	9.700	Fuchs 27'	Schobesberger 48'; Alar 82'	

== 2014 Schalke 04 Cup ==
The 2014 UEFA Schalke Cup, commonly known as the 2014 Schalke 04 Cup, was a club association football competition organised by UEFA and Swiss company Kentaro AG. It was also hosted by Bundesliga club Schalke 04 and was held at the Veltins-Arena, the club's home ground.

=== Standings ===
Pos	Team	Pld	W	D	L	GF	GA	GD	Pts	Result
1	(Spain) Málaga	2	2	0	0	5	1	+4	6	Champion
2	(England) Newcastle United	2	1	0	1	4	4	0	3	
3	(England) West Ham United	2	0	1	1	0	2	−2	2	
4	(Germany) Schalke 04	2	0	1	1	1	3	−2	1	

Source: Matches
Rules for classification: (1) points; (2) goal difference; (3) goals scored

=== Matches ===
2 August 2014
15:30 CEST

Málaga (Spain)	3–1	(England) Newcastle United
Darder 25'; Castillejo 32', 43'	Report	Obertan 60'

Veltins-Arena, Gelsenkirchen
Referee: Christian Bandurski

2 August 2014
17:45 CEST

Schalke 04 (Germany)	0-0	(England) West Ham United
	Report
Penalties
Neustädter (penalty scored); Meyer (penalty scored); Papadopoulos (penalty scored); Santana (penalty missed); Aogo (penalty scored); Itter (penalty scored); Sobottka (penalty scored); Borgmann (penalty missed)	6–7	Nolan (penalty scored); Collins (penalty scored); Vaz Tê (penalty missed); Lee (penalty scored); Poyet (penalty scored); O'Brien (penalty scored); Potts (penalty scored); Lletget (penalty scored)

Veltins-Arena, Gelsenkirchen
Referee: Guido Winkmann

3 August 2014
15:30 CEST

Málaga (Spain)	2–0	(England) West Ham United
Rescaldani 22'; Luis Alberto 24'	Report

Veltins-Arena, Gelsenkirchen
Referee: Arne Aarnink

3 August 2014
17:45 CEST

Schalke 04 (Germany)	1–3	(England) Newcastle United
Avdijaj 90+1'	Report	Rivière 18'; Aarons 54'; Cabella 72'

Veltins-Arena, Gelsenkirchen
Referee: Thorsten Kinhöfer

== Competitions ==
=== Overview ===
Competition	First match	Last match	Starting round	Final position	Record							
Competition	First match	Last match	Starting round	Final position	G	W	D	L	GF	GA	GD	Win %
Bundesliga	23 August 2014	23 May 2015	Matchday 1	6th	34	13	9	12	42	40	+2	38.24
DFB-Pokal	18 August 2014	18 August 2014	First round	First round	1	0	0	1	1	2	−1	0.00
UEFA Champions League	17 September 2014	10 March 2015	Group stage	Round of 16	8	3	2	3	13	19	−6	37.50
UEFA Schalke Cup	2 August 2014	3 May 2015	Matchday 1	4th	2	0	0	2	1	3	−2	0.00
Total					45	16	11	18	57	64	−7	35.56
Updated: 23 May 2015

=== Bundesliga ===
==== League table ====
Pos	Team	Pld	W	D	L	GF	GA	GD	Pts	Qualification or relegation
4	Bayer Leverkusen	34	17	10	7	62	37	+25	61	Qualification for the Champions League play-off round
5	FC Augsburg	34	15	4	15	43	43	0	49	Qualification for the Europa League group stage (Note: Since the winners of the 2014–15 DFB-Pokal, VfL Wolfsburg, qualified for the Champions League based on league position, the Europa League group stage spot was passed to the sixth-placed team, Schalke 04; and the Europa League third qualifying round spot was passed to the seventh-placed team, Borussia Dortmund.)
6	Schalke 04	34	13	9	12	42	40	+2	48	Qualification for the Europa League group stage
7	Borussia Dortmund	34	13	7	14	47	42	+5	46	Qualification for the Europa League third qualifying round
8	1899 Hoffenheim	34	12	8	14	49	55	−6	44	

Source: DFB
Rules for classification: 1) points; 2) goal difference; 3) number of goals scored

==== Results summary ====
Overall								Home						Away					
Pld	W	D	L	GF	GA	GD	Pts	W	D	L	GF	GA	GD	W	D	L	GF	GA	GD
34	13	9	12	42	40	+2	48	10	5	2	26	14	+12	3	4	10	16	26	−10

Last updated: 23 May 2015.
Source: Matches

==== Matches ====
Matchday	Date	Kickoff	Stadium	Opponent	Result	Attendance	Goalscorers		Table		Source
Matchday	Date	Kickoff	Stadium	Opponent	Result	Attendance	Schalke 04	Opponent	Pos.	Pts.	Source
1	23 August 2014	15:30	A	Hannover 96	1–2	49.000	Huntelaar 47'	Prib 67'; Joselu 70'	14	0	
2	30 August 2014	18:30	H	Bayern Munich	1–1	61.973	Höwedes 62'	Lewandowski 10'	13	1	
3	13 September 2014	18:30	A	Borussia Mönchengladbach	1–4	54.010	Choupo-Moting 52' (pen.)	Hahn 17', 50'; Kruse 56'; Raffael 79'	16	1	
4	20 September 2014	15:30	H	Eintracht Frankfurt	2–2	61.798	Choupo-Moting 40' (pen.); Draxler 50'	Meier 15'; Russ 24'	16	2	
5	23 September 2014	20:00	A	Werder Bremen	3–0	40.139	Meyer 48'; Neustädter 51'; Barnetta 85'	—	13	5	
6	27 September 2014	15:30	H	Borussia Dortmund	2–1	61.000	Matip 10'; Choupo-Moting 23'	Aubameyang 26'	10	8	
7	4 October 2014	15:30	A	1899 Hoffenheim	1–2	30.000	Huntelaar 83'	Elyounoussi 13'; Szalai 29'	11	8	
8	18 October 2014	18:30	H	Hertha BSC	2–0	61.973	Huntelaar 19'; Draxler 65'	—	9	11	
9	25 October 2014	18:30	A	Bayer Leverkusen	0–1	30.210	—	Çalhanoğlu 53'	12	11	
10	31 October 2014	20:30	H	FC Augsburg	1–0	60.954	Huntelaar 37'	—	8	14	
11	8 November 2014	15:30	A	SC Freiburg	0–2	24.000	—	Günter 22'; Schmid 68'	11	14	
12	22 November 2014	15:30	H	VfL Wolfsburg	3–2	60.989	Choupo-Moting 10', 22'; Fuchs 25'	Olić 37'; Bendtner 74'	7	17	
13	29 November 2014	15:30	H	Mainz 05	4–1	60.904	Huntelaar 9', 25', 61'; Barnetta 54'	Okazaki 44'	6	20	
14	6 December 2014	15:30	A	VfB Stuttgart	4–0	44.700	Choupo-Moting 1', 21', 61'; Meyer 10'	—	4	23	
15	13 December 2014	15:30	H	1. FC Köln	1–2	61.516	Sané 85'	Ujah 47'; Lehmann 67' (pen.)	6	23	
16	17 December 2014	20:00	A	SC Paderborn	2–1	15.000	Choupo-Moting 44'; Neustädter 78'	Ayhan 31' (o.g.)	5	26	
17	20 December 2014	15:30	H	Hamburger SV	0–0	61.973	—	—	5	27	
18	31 January 2015	15:30	H	Hannover 96	1–0	61.646	Höger 32'	—	4	30	
19	3 February 2015	20:00	A	Bayern Munich	1–1	75.000	Höwedes 72'	Robben 67'	6	31	
20	6 February 2015	20:40	H	Borussia Mönchengladbach	1–0	61.973	Barnetta 11'	—	3	34	
21	14 February 2015	18:30	A	Eintracht Frankfurt	0–1	50.400	—	Piazon 65'	4	34	
22	21 February 2015	15:30	H	Werder Bremen	1–1	61.973	Meyer 61'	Prödl 90+2'	4	35	
23	28 February 2015	15:30	A	Borussia Dortmund	0–3	79.500	—	Aubameyang 78'; Mkhitaryan 79'; Reus 86'	5	35	
24	7 March 2015	15:30	H	1899 Hoffenheim	3–1	60.607	Fuchs 12'; Meyer 41', 53'	Volland 73'	5	38	
25	14 March 2015	15:30	A	Hertha BSC	2–2	59.156	Sané 40'; Matip 90'	Ben-Hatira 21'; Haraguchi 81'	5	39	
26	21 March 2015	18:30	H	Bayer Leverkusen	0–1	61.973	—	Bellarabi 35'	5	39	
27	5 April 2015	15:30	A	FC Augsburg	0–0	30.660	—	—	5	40	
28	11 April 2015	15:30	H	SC Freiburg	0–0	61.471	—	—	5	41	
29	19 April 2015	17:30	A	VfL Wolfsburg	1–1	30.000	Sané 53'	De Bruyne 78'	5	42	
30	24 April 2015	20:30	A	Mainz 05	0–2	34.000	—	Bell 28', 31'	5	42	
31	2 May 2015	15:30	H	VfB Stuttgart	3–2	61.973	Huntelaar 9', 78'; Klein 89' (o.g.)	Harnik 22'; Kostić 51'	5	45	
32	10 May 2015	17:30	A	1. FC Köln	0–2	46.500	—	Risse 34'; Gerhardt 89'	6	45	
33	16 May 2015	15:30	H	SC Paderborn	1–0	61.973	Hünemeier 88' (o.g.)	—	5	48	
34	23 May 2015	15:30	A	Hamburger SV	0–2	57.000	—	Olić 49'; Rajković 58'	6	48	

=== UEFA Champions League ===
==== Group stage ====
===== Table =====
Pos	Team	Pld	W	D	L	GF	GA	GD	Pts	Qualification	CHE	SCH	SPO	MRB
1	(England) Chelsea	6	4	2	0	17	3	+14	14	Advance to knockout phase	—	1–1	3–1	6–0
2	(Germany) Schalke 04	6	2	2	2	9	14	−5	8	Advance to knockout phase	0–5	—	4–3	1–1
3	(Portugal) Sporting CP	6	2	1	3	12	12	0	7	Transfer to Europa League	0–1	4–2	—	3–1
4	(Slovenia) Maribor	6	0	3	3	4	13	−9	3		1–1	0–1	1–1	—

Source: UEFA
Rules for classification: Group stage tiebreakers

===== Matches =====
Matchday	Date	Kickoff	Stadium	Opponent	Result	Attendance	Goalscorers		Table		Source
Matchday	Date	Kickoff	Stadium	Opponent	Result	Attendance	Schalke 04	Opponent	Pos.	Pts	Source
1	17 September 2014	20:45 (LT 19:45)	A	Chelsea	1–1	40.648	Huntelaar 62'	Fàbregas 11'	1	1	
2	30 September 2014	20:45	H	Maribor	1–1	47.997	Huntelaar 56'	Bohar 38'	2	2	
3	21 October 2014	20:45	H	Sporting CP	4–3	49.943	Obasi 34'; Huntelaar 51'; Höwedes 60'; Choupo-Moting 90+3' (pen.)	Nani 16'; A. Silva 64' (pen.), 78'	2	5	
4	5 November 2014	20:45 (LT 19:45)	A	Sporting CP	2–4	35.473	Slimani 17' (o.g.); Aogo 88'	Sarr 26'; Jefferson 52'; Nani 72'; Slimani 90+1'	2	5	
5	25 November 2014	20:45	H	Chelsea	0–5	54.442	—	Terry 2'; Willian 29'; Kirchhoff 44' (o.g.); Drogba 76'; Ramires 78'	3	5	
6	10 December 2014	20:45	A	Maribor	1–0	12.516	Meyer 62'	—	2	8	

==== Knockout phase ====
===== Round of 16 =====
Leg	Date	Kickoff	Stadium	Opponent	Result	Agg. score	Attendance	Goalscorers		Source
Leg	Date	Kickoff	Stadium	Opponent	Result	Agg. score	Attendance	Schalke 04	Opponent	Source
1	18 February 2014	20:45	H	Real Madrid	0–2	—	54.442	—	Ronaldo 26'; Marcelo 79'	
2	10 March 2014	20:45	A	Real Madrid	4–3	4–5	69.986	Fuchs 20'; Huntelaar 40', 84'; Sané 57'	Ronaldo 25', 45'; Benzema 52'	

=== DFB-Pokal ===
Round	Date	Kickoff	Stadium	Opponent	Result	Attendance	Goalscorers		Source
Round	Date	Kickoff	Stadium	Opponent	Result	Attendance	Schalke 04	Opponent	Source
First round	18 August 2014	20:30	A	Dynamo Dresden	1–2	29,590	Matip 78'	Eilers 24'; Teixeira 50'	

=== UEFA Schalke Cup ===
==== Standings ====
Pos	Team	Pld	W	D	L	GF	GA	GD	Pts	Result
1	(Spain) Málaga	2	2	0	0	5	1	+4	6	Champion
2	(England) Newcastle United	2	1	0	1	4	4	0	3	
3	(England) West Ham United	2	0	1	1	0	2	−2	2	
4	(Germany) Schalke 04	2	0	1	1	1	3	−2	1	

Source: Matches
Rules for classification: (1) points; (2) goal difference; (3) goals scored

==== Matches ====
Date	Kickoff^{1}	Stadium	City	Opponent	Result^{2}	Attendance	Goalscorers		Source
Date	Kickoff^{1}	Stadium	City	Opponent	Result^{2}	Attendance	FC Schalke 04	Opponent	Source
2 August 2014	17:45	Veltins-Arena	Gelsenkirchen	West Ham United	6–7 (a.p.s.o.)	15,704	Neustädter (penalty scored); Meyer (penalty scored); Papadopoulos (penalty scored); Felipe Santana (penalty missed); Aogo (penalty scored); Itter (penalty scored); Sobottka (penalty scored); Borgmann (penalty missed)	Nolan (penalty scored); Collins (penalty scored); Vaz Tê (penalty missed); Lee (penalty scored); Poyet (penalty scored); O'Brien (penalty scored); Potts (penalty scored); Lletget (penalty scored)	
3 August 2014	17:45	Veltins-Arena	Gelsenkirchen	Newcastle United	1–3	20,000	Avdijaj 90'	Rivière 18'; Aarons 54'; Cabella 72'	

== Squad statistics ==
=== Appearances and goals ===
Player	Total		Bundesliga		DFB-Pokal		Champions League	
Player	Apps	Gls	Apps	Gls	Apps	Gls	Apps	Gls
Goalkeepers
Ralf Fährmann	32 (0)	0	25 (0)	0	1 (0)	0	6 (0)	0
Christian Wetklo	0 (0)	0	0 (0)	0	0 (0)	0	0 (0)	0
Fabian Giefer	2 (0)	0	2 (0)	0	0 (0)	0	0 (0)	0
Timon Wellenreuther	9 (1)	0	7 (1)	0	0 (0)	0	2 (0)	0
Defenders
Marvin Friedrich	2 (4)	0	2 (3)	0	0 (0)	0	0 (1)	0
Benedikt Höwedes	34 (0)	3	28 (0)	2	0 (0)	0	6 (0)	1
Felipe Santana	5 (1)	0	3 (1)	0	1 (0)	0	1 (0)	0
Sead Kolašinac	7 (0)	0	6 (0)	0	1 (0)	0	0 (0)	0
Dennis Aogo	27 (5)	1	20 (5)	0	0 (0)	0	7 (0)	1
Atsuto Uchida	23 (3)	0	18 (1)	0	0 (0)	0	5 (2)	0
Christian Fuchs	25 (5)	3	20 (5)	2	0 (0)	0	5 (0)	1
Kaan Ayhan	13 (6)	0	10 (5)	0	0 (0)	0	3 (1)	0
Matija Nastasić	18 (0)	0	16 (0)	0	0 (0)	0	2 (0)	0
Joël Matip	21 (4)	3	17 (4)	2	1 (0)	1	3 (0)	0
Midfielders
Jan Kirchhoff	14 (4)	0	12 (2)	0	0 (0)	0	2 (2)	0
Max Meyer	26 (11)	6	22 (6)	5	1 (0)	0	3 (5)	1
Leon Goretzka	3 (8)	0	3 (7)	0	0 (0)	0	0 (1)	0
Kevin-Prince Boateng	17 (8)	0	11 (7)	0	1 (0)	0	5 (1)	0
Julian Draxler	11 (8)	2	8 (7)	2	0 (1)	0	3 (0)	0
Christian Clemens	1 (9)	0	1 (7)	0	0 (1)	0	0 (1)	0
Marco Höger	34 (0)	1	26 (0)	1	1 (0)	0	7 (0)	0
Jefferson Farfán	6 (3)	0	6 (3)	0	0 (0)	0	0 (0)	0
Sidney Sam	9 (6)	0	7 (4)	0	1 (0)	0	1 (2)	0
Leroy Sané	7 (7)	4	7 (6)	3	0 (0)	0	0 (1)	1
Tranquillo Barnetta	13 (14)	3	10 (12)	3	0 (1)	0	3 (1)	0
René Klingenburg	0 (0)	0	0 (0)	0	0 (0)	0	0 (0)	0
Roman Neustädter	37 (1)	2	28 (1)	2	1 (0)	0	8 (0)	0
Pascal Itter	0 (0)	0	0 (0)	0	0 (0)	0	0 (0)	0
Forwards
Eric Maxim Choupo-Moting	37 (3)	10	30 (1)	9	1 (0)	0	6 (2)	1
Chinedu Obasi	3 (7)	1	1 (5)	0	0 (0)	0	2 (2)	1
Klaas-Jan Huntelaar	36 (1)	14	27 (1)	9	1 (0)	0	8 (0)	5
Donis Avdijaj	0 (0)	0	0 (0)	0	0 (0)	0	0 (0)	0
Felix Platte	1 (2)	0	1 (1)	0	0 (0)	0	0 (1)	0
Appearances = Total appearances (Substitute appearances)
Last updated: 23 May 2015

Players in white left the club during the season.

=== Discipline ===
==== Bookings ====
No.	Player	Total			Bundesliga			DFB-Pokal			Champions League		
No.	Player	Yellow card	(yellow card) (red card)	Red card	Yellow card	(yellow card) (red card)	Red card	Yellow card	(yellow card) (red card)	Red card	Yellow card	(yellow card) (red card)	Red card
1	Ralf Fährmann	0	0	0	0	0	0	0	0	0	0	0	0
2	Marvin Friedrich	0	0	0	0	0	0	0	0	0	0	0	0
3	Jan Kirchhoff	3	0	0	2	0	0	0	0	0	1	0	0
4	Benedikt Höwedes	8	0	0	8	0	0	0	0	0	0	0	0
5	Felipe Santana	1	0	0	0	0	0	1	0	0	0	0	0
6	Sead Kolašinac	2	0	0	2	0	0	0	0	0	1	0	0
7	Max Meyer	0	0	0	0	0	0	0	0	0	0	0	0
8	Leon Goretzka	1	0	0	1	0	0	0	0	0	0	0	0
9	Kevin-Prince Boateng	6	1	0	2	1	0	1	0	0	3	0	0
10	Julian Draxler	1	0	1	1	0	1	0	0	0	0	0	0
11	Christian Clemens	0	0	0	0	0	0	0	0	0	0	0	0
12	Marco Höger	13	0	0	11	0	0	0	0	0	2	0	0
13	Eric Maxim Choupo-Moting	0	0	0	0	0	0	0	0	0	0	0	0
15	Dennis Aogo	9	0	0	8	0	0	0	0	0	1	0	0
17	Jefferson Farfán	2	0	0	2	0	0	0	0	0	0	0	0
18	Sidney Sam	1	0	0	1	0	0	0	0	0	0	0	0
19	Leroy Sané	1	0	0	1	0	0	0	0	0	0	0	0
20	Chinedu Obasi	0	0	0	0	0	0	0	0	0	0	0	0
22	Atsuto Uchida	2	0	0	2	0	0	0	0	0	0	0	0
23	Christian Fuchs	3	0	0	3	0	0	0	0	0	0	0	0
24	Kaan Ayhan	3	0	0	3	0	0	0	0	0	0	0	0
25	Klaas-Jan Huntelaar	7	0	1	5	0	1	0	0	0	2	0	0
27	Tranquillo Barnetta	0	0	0	0	0	0	0	0	0	0	0	0
28	Christian Wetklo	0	0	0	0	0	0	0	0	0	0	0	0
29	Donis Avdijaj	0	0	0	0	0	0	0	0	0	0	0	0
30	René Klingenburg	0	0	0	0	0	0	0	0	0	0	0	0
31	Matija Nastasić	3	0	0	3	0	0	0	0	0	0	0	0
32	Joël Matip	2	1	0	2	1	0	0	0	0	0	0	0
33	Roman Neustädter	8	0	0	6	0	0	0	0	0	2	0	0
34	Fabian Giefer	1	0	0	1	0	0	0	0	0	0	0	0
36	Felix Platte	0	0	0	0	0	0	0	0	0	0	0	0
37	Pascal Itter	0	0	0	0	0	0	0	0	0	0	0	0
40	Timon Wellenreuther	0	0	0	0	0	0	0	0	0	0	0	0
Totals		75	2	2	62	2	2	2	0	0	11	0	0
Last updated: 23 May 2015
