= Felipe Santana =

Brazilian footballer (born 1986)

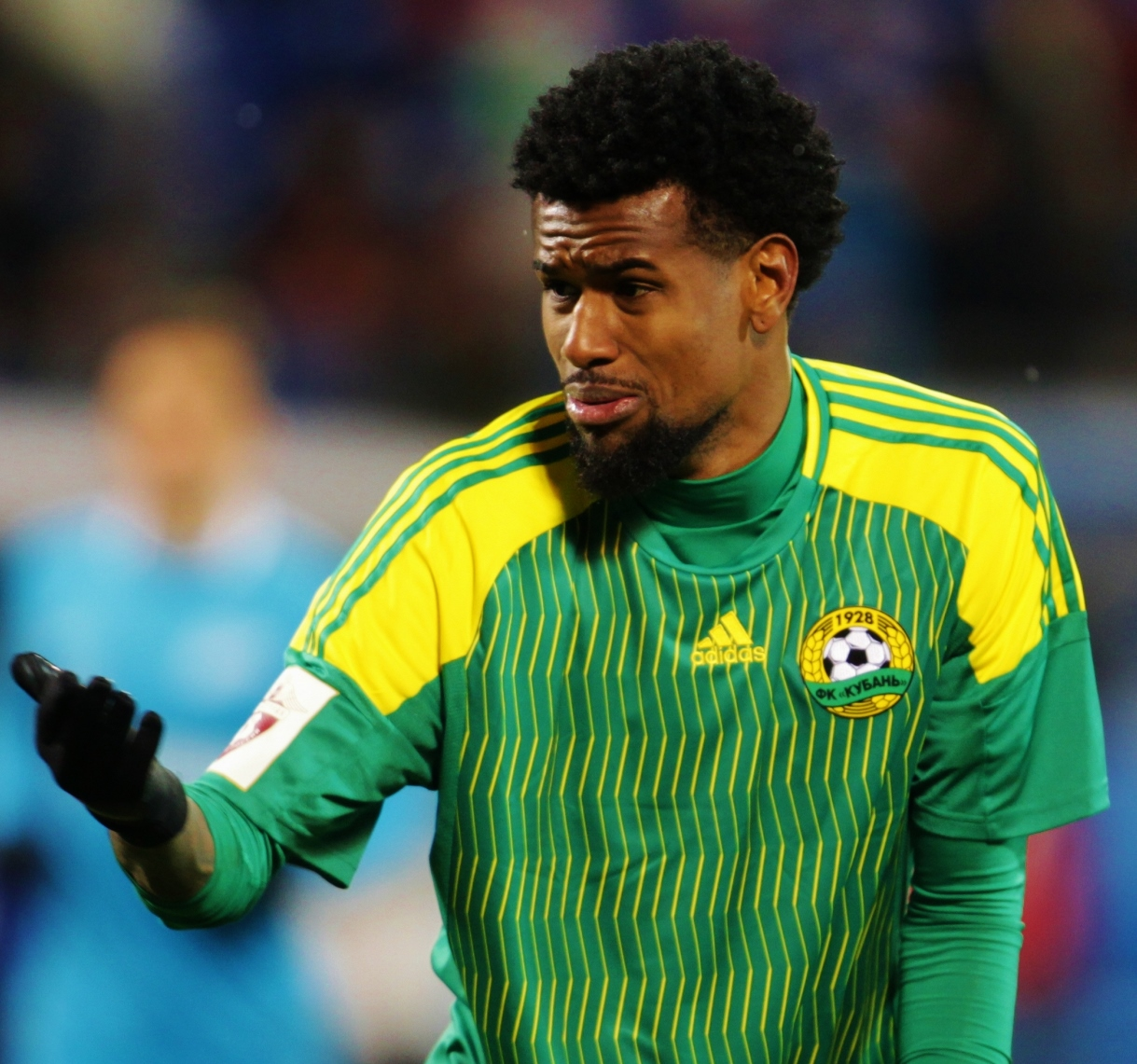
- Felipe Santana with Kuban in 2016

Personal information
- Full name: Felipe Augusto Santana
- Date of birth: 17 March 1986 (age 40)
- Place of birth: Rio Claro, São Paulo, Brazil
- Height: 1.96 m (6 ft 5 in)
- Position: Centre-back

Youth career
- Figueirense

Senior career*
| Years | Team | Apps | (Gls) |
| 2006–2008 | Figueirense | 71 | (6) |
| 2008–2013 | Borussia Dortmund | 95 | (6) |
| 2013–2015 | Schalke 04 | 24 | (1) |
| 2015 | → Olympiacos (loan) | 5 | (0) |
| 2016 | Kuban Krasnodar | 9 | (0) |
| 2017–2018 | Atlético Mineiro | 21 | (1) |
| 2020–2021 | Chapecoense | 21 | (0) |
| 2023 | Atlético Catarinense | 3 | (0) |
| Total | | 249 | (14) |
- * Club domestic league appearances and goals

Felipe Augusto Santana (Brazilian Portuguese pronunciation: [feˈlipi awˈɡustu sɐ̃ˈtɐnɐ, fiˈ-]; born 17 March 1986) is a Brazilian former professional footballer who played as a centre-back. During a 17-year career, he also played abroad for football clubs in Germany, Greece and Russia.

== Club career ==
=== Figueirense ===
Having started his football career at Figueirense since 1996 and progressed through the club's youth system, Santana made his professional football debut for Figueirense, starting the whole game, in a 1–0 win against Paraná on 24 September 2006. On 18 November 2006, he made his second appearance of the season, in a 2–0 win against Flamengo. At the end of the 2006 season, Santana made two appearances in all competitions.

At the start of the 2007 season, Santana began to establish himself in the first team place, playing in the centre–back position. On 3 July 2007, he scored his first goal of his professional career, in a 2–1 win over Cruzeiro. Two weeks later on 14 July 2007, Santana scored his second goal of the season, in a 2–1 win over Paraná. Twelve days later on 26 July 2007, he scored his third goal of the season, in a 2–2 draw against Corinthians. Santana helped the club keep four consecutive clean sheets between 4 October 2007 and 21 October 2007. At the end of the 2007 season, he went on to make thirty–six appearances and scoring three times in all competitions.

In the opening game of the 2008 season, Santana scored a brace, in a 5–5 draw against Portuguesa, in what turned out to be his only appearance of the season.

=== Borussia Dortmund ===
On 16 May 2008, Santana joined Bundesliga club Borussia Dortmund, with a fee in the region of €2,000,000 and signed a five-year deal. Upon joining the club, Borussia Dortmund's sports manager Michael Zorc said about the match: "It doesn't cost one, but also not three million euros. He's a player like Werder Bremen's Naldo. Maybe even a little more aggressive."

Having appeared in the substitute bench in the first two months of the 2008–09 season, Santana made his debut for the club, starting a match and played 67 minutes before being substituted, in a 2–0 loss against Udinese in the first leg of the UEFA Cup first round. However, Borussia Dortmund were eliminated from the tournament after losing on penalties in the return despite coming back from 2–0 down to equalise. Three days later after making his debut for the club, he made his league debut against Hoffenheim on 21 September 2008 and scored his first goal in a 4–1 loss. This was followed up by scoring his second goal for Borussia Dortmund, in a 3–0 win over Stuttgart. After missing the next six matches due to injury, Santana returned to the starting line–up against Eintracht Frankfurt on 15 November 2008 and scored his third goal for the club, in a 4–0 win. Following this, he regained his first team place, forming a centre–back partnership with Neven Subotić for the rest of the 2008–09 season. Santana then helped Borussia Dortmund keep four consecutive clean sheets between 18 April 2009 and 9 May 2009. During which, he scored his fourth goal for the club, in a 4–0 win against Karlsruher SC. In his first season at Borussia Dortmund, Santana made twenty-three appearances and scoring four times in all competitions.

At the start of the 2009–10 season, Santana continued to regain his first team place, forming a centre–back partnership with Subotić. In a match against Bayern Munich on 12 September 2009, he was at fault when his mistakes led Thomas Müller scoring Bayern Munich's fourth goal of the game, as the club lost 5–1 on 12 September 2009. As a result, Santana was dropped to the substitute bench between 19 September 2009 and 31 October 2009, though he started two times for Borussia Dortmund. He returned to the starting line–up against Werder Bremen on 8 November 2009 and helped Borussia Dortmund draw 1–1. Following this, Santana found himself in and out of the starting line–up, competing in a centre–back position with Mats Hummels and Subotić throughout the 2009–10 season. At times, he rotated into the starting line–up when either of Hummels and Subotić were absent from the squad. At the end of the 2009–10 season, Santana went on to make twenty–seven appearances in all competitions.

At the start of the 2010–11 season, Santana found himself placed on the substitute bench, as Mats Hummels and Subotić were continued to be Borussia Dortmund's first choice centre–backs by Manager Jürgen Klopp. On 22 September 2010, he made his first appearance of the season against Kaiserslautern, coming on as a 78th-minute substitute, in a 5–0 win. As a result, Santana found his playing time, mostly coming from the substitute bench. He made his first start of the season, starting the whole game, in a 0–0 draw against rivals, Schalke 04 on 4 February 2011. Santana later made four more starts for the club later in the 2010–11 season. His contributions to the club saw them win the league for the first time since 2002 after they beat Nürnberg 2–0 on 30 April 2011. At the end of the 2010–11 season, he went on to make thirteen appearances in all competitions.

Ahead of the 2011–12 season, Santana said in an interview that he wanted to leave Borussia Dortmund and doesn't want to stay at the club to be on the substitute bench. But Borussia Dortmund's sport manager Zorc said the player will not be leaving the club. At the start of the 2011–12 season, Santana formed a centre–back partnership with Hummels against rivals, Schalke 04 in the DFL-Supercup and played 120 minutes in a 0–0 draw, as Borussia Dortmund lost 4–3 in the penalty shootout. He then started with Hummels in the first two league matches against Hamburger SV and Hoffenheim. However, Santana suffered ankle injury that saw him recovered, but saw him placed on the substitute bench, with Hummels and Subotić continued to be the club's first choice centre–backs. He made his UEFA Champions League debut against Olympiacos on 1 November 2011 and came on as an 86th-minute substitute, in a 1–0 win. Three weeks later on 23 November 2011, Santana made his first UEFA Champions League start, in a 2–1 loss against Arsenal. Three days later on 26 November 2011, he scored his first goal of the season, in a 2–0 win against rivals, Schalke 04. Following Subotić's injury, Santana started in the next five matches by the end of the year until he suffered an injury during a match against SC Freiburg on 17 December 2011 and was substituted in the 71st minute, as Borussia Dortmund won 4–1. After the match, it was announced that Santana was out for one month with the injury. After returning from injury, Santana continued to remain on the substitute bench, as he continuously found it hard to dispatch Hummels and Subotić, as well as, another injury. Despite this, Santana's contributions at the club win a double: the league, and DFB-Pokal. At the end of the 2011–12 season, he went on to make seventeen appearances and scoring once in all competitions. Following this, Santana had his contract extended with Borussia Dortmund, keeping him until 2014.

Prior to signing a new contract ahead of the 2012–13 season, Santana said that he had thought about leaving Borussia Dortmund, due to continuously being on the substitute bench. Santana was linked a move to Bayer Leverkusen, but his advisor Volker Struth denied the move from happening. At the start of the 2012–13 season, he continued to be placed on the substitute bench. Santana made his first appearance of the season, starting the whole game, in a 3–0 win against FC Oberneuland in the first round of the DFB–Pokal. As part of Klopp's rotation plan, he was given an opportunity to get more playing time, making a number of starts in the absence of first choice centre–backs, Hummels and Subotić, However, this left Santana unsatisfied with the role, due to his hopes of playing in the FIFA World Cup in his homeland country, Brazil. He scored his first Bundesliga goal in three years, in a 5–0 win over Werder Bremen on 19 January 2013. The second half of the season saw Santana receiving a handful of first team opportunities and formed a centre–back partnership with either Hummels and Subotić. On 3 March 2013, he scored the first UEFA Champions League goal in a 3–0 victory over Shakhtar Donetsk in the second leg of the last 16 with a header directly from a corner to advance to the next round. After the match, Manager Klopp praised Santana's performance. A month later on 9 April 2013, he scored a goal in the last minute against Málaga on 9 April 2013 to win the tie with Borussia Dortmund progressing to the semi-finals. They went on to reach the final of the UEFA Champions League to face Bayern Munich, but lost 2–1. After the match, Santana said the club should not have been disappointed with their progression, but he stated his desire to leave the club in order to get first team football. At the end of the 2012–13 season, Santana went on to make thirty–one appearances and scoring three times in all competitions.

Since leaving Borussia Dortmund, Santana has been critical of Jürgen Klopp, describing him as "stupid". In response, the club's CEO Hans-Joachim Watzke expressed anger towards him, calling him unprofessional. Despite being critical towards Klopp, Santana described leaving Dortmund for Schalke as a "hard decision", due to the rivalry between two clubs.

=== Schalke 04 ===
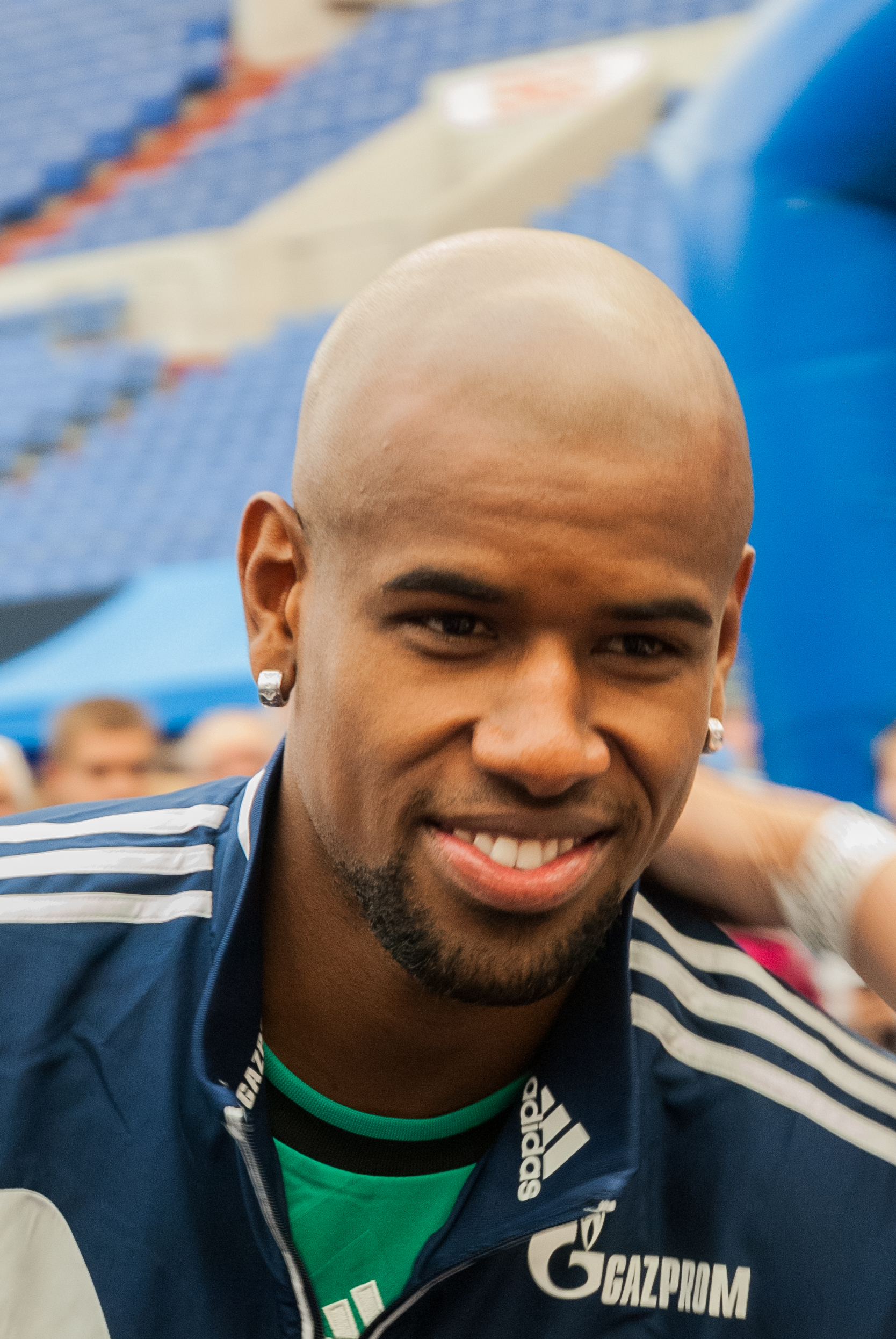
Felipe Santana being presented as a Schalke 04 player.

On 28 May 2013, FC Schalke 04 confirmed that Felipe Santana had signed a contract with them until 30 June 2016, with the transfer fee was reported by media as €1,000,000 at the time. Upon joining the club, he was assigned the number 5 shirt, previously worn by Marcelo Bordon. Schalke 04 were monitoring Santana's situation three months before making a move.

He made his debut for the club, playing the whole game, in a 4–0 loss against Wolfsburg on 17 August 2013. In a match against PAOK in the second leg of the UEFA Champions League play–off round, Santana started the whole game and helped Schalke 04 beat the opposition team 3–2 to advance to the group stage. Since joining the club, he found himself in and out of the first team, competing a place in the centre–back position. Santana then helped Schalke 04 keep three consecutive clean sheets between 15 December 2013 and 26 January 2014. This was followed up when he scored his first goal for the club, in a 2–1 win over Wolfsburg on 1 February 2014. However, Santana suffered a torn muscle fibre while training and this sidelined him out a month. He didn't make his return to the first team against Eintracht Frankfurt on 11 April 2014, coming on as an 82nd-minute substitute, in a 2–0 win. However, in a match against Freiburg on 3 May 2014, Santana was sent–off for a second bookable offence, as Schalke 04 won 2–0 to qualify for the UEFA Champions League next season. At the end of the 2013–14 season, he went on to make twenty–six appearances and scoring once in all competitions.

At the start of the 2014–15 season, Santana's first appearance of the season came on 18 August 2014 against Dynamo Dresden in the first round of the DFB–Pokal and set up Schalke 04's first goal of the game, as the club lost 2–1. However, during a 1–1 draw against Bayern Munich on 30 August 2014, he suffered a tore his muscle bundle in the 81st minute and was substituted as a result. After the match, it was announced that Santana would be sidelined for weeks. It wasn't until on 22 November 2014 when he made his return to the starting line–up against Wolfsburg and helped Schalke 04 win 3–2. However, his return was short–lived when Santana suffered a thigh injury that kept him out for weeks. But he made his return to the first team, coming on as a second-half substitute, in a 2–1 win against SC Paderborn on 17 December 2014. By the time Santana was loaned out for the rest of the 2014–15 season, he went on to make six appearances in all competitions.

Ahead of the 2015–16 season, Santana was linked with a move to Köln and agreed with a move. However, the move failed after he failed a medical and stayed at Schalke 04 without making an appearance. Following this, Santana was told by the club's management that he can leave Schalke 04, as they have no future for him.

==== Olympiacos (loan) ====
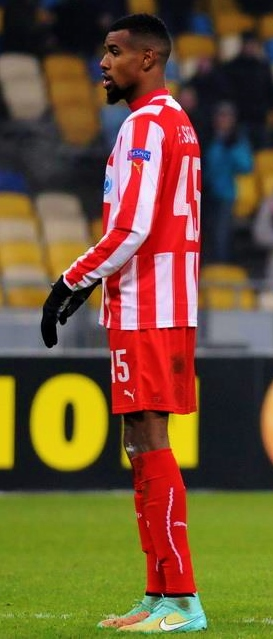
Felipe Santana in action for Olympiacos in 2015.

It was announced on 30 January 2015 that Santana left Schalke 04 to sign for Super League Greece side Olympiacos on loan for the rest of the 2014–15 season. It was previously hinted that he could be leaving the club with a suitable offer.

He made his debut for the club, starting the whole game, in a 2–1 win over Atromitos on 4 February 2015. This was followed up by helping Olympiacos keeping two clean sheets in the next two league matches against PAOK and Ergotelis. However, Santana found himself placed on the substitute bench for the rest of the 2014–15 season. Despite this, his appearances for Olympiacos saw the club win the league. Having made eight appearances in all competitions, he returned to his parent club after Olympiacos did not opt to sign him on a permanent basis.

=== Kuban Krasnodar ===
On 11 January 2016, Santana signed a contract with the Russian Premier League side FC Kuban Krasnodar. The contract was due to expire in the summer of 2018. Upon joining Kuban Krasnodar, Santana revealed that Ari and Kevin Kurányi played a role when they persuaded him to play in Russia.

Santana made his Kuban Krasnodar debut on 5 March 2016, in a 1–0 loss against Rubin Kazan. Having played in the centre–back position, he began to play in the defensive midfield position. However, Santana was unable to help the club survive relegation in the Russian Premier League. At the end of the 2015–16 season, he went on to make twelve appearances in all competitions. Following this, Santana left Kuban Krasnodar in the summer after his contract expired. He acknowledged his struggle to settle in Russia, having to fail to understood the language.

=== Atlético Mineiro ===
On 21 December 2016, Brazilian club Atlético Mineiro confirmed the signing of Santana for two seasons. He was previously linked with a move to Primeira Liga side Braga but the move was broken down. Santana also went on trial at his former club, Figueirense.

He made his debut for the club, starting the whole game, in a 1–1 draw against Flamengo in the opening game of the season. Santana has been involved in a number of first team matches for the next two months, playing in the centre–back position. He scored his first goal for Atlético Mineiro, in a 2–2 draw against Sport Recife on 22 June 2017. However, Santana was plagued with injuries that affected his season. At the end of the 2017 season, he went on to make fourteen appearances in all competitions.

Ahead of the 2018 season, Santana said he's prepared to face new competitions in the defence. However, his contract was mutually rescinded on 25 April 2018. During his one year and four months at the club, Santana made 29 appearances and scored one goal.

=== Chapecoense ===
On 10 July 2020, it was announced that Chapecoense signed Santana until on 30 December 2020, ending his two years spell as a free agent.

Having not appeared in the first team for the next three months, he made his debut for the club, starting the whole game, in a 3–1 win against Sampaio Corrêa on 20 November 2020. His involvement in the first team since December saw Chapecoense promoted to the Série A after a 2–1 win against Figueirense on 12 January 2021. At the end of the 2020 season, Santana went on to make nine appearances in all competitions.

Following this, he reflected on winning the promotion to Série A, saying: "I opted for Chapecoense, for the affection shown, first, and for the time they would give me. I didn't know that we would achieve goals as we did. Not only access, but the Santa Catarina title, too. When I signed with Chapecoense, they were very bad in Santa Catarina, in the sticking zone, and a rebirth of eighth started, playing against the first and becoming champion. It gave us fuel to start the Brazilian on the right foot. I played two games, but in the first one I didn't know how I would react, since I had not played for two years, only training very hard. Everything went well, then the defender came back, respecting the hierarchy, I went back to the bench and, when the injury came, I started to have a sequence that only put me on the launch pad. And the more games I received, the more I improved. I hope to continue this." After weeks of speculation over his future at the club, Santana signed a contract extension with Chapecoense for another season.

=== Atlético Catarinense ===
Being for a year without a team, on January 1, 2023, Santana signed a contract with Atlético Catarinense.

=== Retirement ===
On January 16, 2023, after just 15 days with Catarinense, Santana announced on Instagram that he would retire at the end of his contract. He later confirmed his retirement after his departure from Catarinense on February 5, 2023.

== Playing style ==
Santana is known for his strength, agility and aerial ability in defence. Santana was described in his early 20s by Brazilian experts as a "rising star". His defensive skills and his understanding of the game on the football pitch led to comparisons with defenders Lilian Thuram, Lúcio, and Naldo.

== Personal life ==
Santana has stated that his mother is the "most important person" and support in his life. Though born in Brazil, Santana said he has settled in Germany, and applied for a German passport. In addition to speaking Portuguese, Santana speaks German, having learnt the language during his time in the country. Santana speaks a total of 8 languages (Portuguese, Spanish, German, Japanese, Lithuanian, Latvian, Russian and English).

In November 2009, Santana and his teammate Lucas Barrios were diagnosed with H1N1 (Swine flu) virus that saw the pair being quickly vaccinated. In April 2014, Santana and his then teammate Sead Kolašinac were reprimanded and fined by Jens Keller and manager Horst Heldt after they were caught attending a nightclub at 3am.

Santana is a motorcycle enthusiastic, saying: "Motorcycling is therapy for me. Out and about for hours, with friends, recently we were in a beautiful corner in the Sauerland. Splendid. This is my world. I can laugh and cry under the helmet." He also said about representing the Brazil national team, but acknowledged that due to the strong competitions in the national team squad, it was unlikely to happen. His performance at Schalke 04 led Der Westen to question his performance and wondered why Santana would recommend himself to be in the squad for the FIFA World Cup.

== Career statistics ==
As of 25 October 2021

Appearances and goals by club, season and competition
| Club | Season | League | | | State League | | Cup | | Continental | | Other | | Total | |
| Club | Season | Division | Apps | Goals | Apps | Goals | Apps | Goals | Apps | Goals | Apps | Goals | Apps | Goals |
|---|---|---|---|---|---|---|---|---|---|---|---|---|---|---|
| Figueirense | 2006 | Série A | 2 | 0 | 0 | 0 | 0 | 0 | — | | — | | 2 | 0 |
| Figueirense | 2007 | Série A | 34 | 3 | 11 | 0 | 12 | 2 | 2 (Note: Appearance(s) in Copa Sudamericana) | 0 | — | | 59 | 5 |
| Figueirense | 2008 | Série A | 1 | 2 | 23 | 1 | 0 | 0 | — | | — | | 24 | 3 |
| Figueirense | Total | | 37 | 5 | 34 | 1 | 12 | 2 | 2 | 0 | — | | 85 | 8 |
| Borussia Dortmund | 2008–09 | Bundesliga | 23 | 4 | — | | 0 | 0 | 1 (Note: Appearance(s) in UEFA Cup) | 0 | — | | 24 | 4 |
| Borussia Dortmund | 2009–10 | Bundesliga | 25 | 0 | — | | 2 | 0 | — | | — | | 27 | 0 |
| Borussia Dortmund | 2010–11 | Bundesliga | 13 | 0 | — | | 0 | 0 | 0 | 0 | — | | 13 | 0 |
| Borussia Dortmund | 2011–12 | Bundesliga | 13 | 1 | — | | 0 | 0 | 3 (Note: Appearance(s) in UEFA Champions League) | 0 | 1 (Note: Appearance(s) in DFL-Supercup) | 0 | 17 | 1 |
| Borussia Dortmund | 2012–13 | Bundesliga | 21 | 1 | — | | 0 | 0 | 7 | 2 | 0 | 0 | 28 | 3 |
| Borussia Dortmund | Total | | 95 | 6 | — | | 2 | 0 | 11 | 2 | 1 | 0 | 109 | 8 |
| Schalke 04 | 2013–14 | Bundesliga | 20 | 1 | — | | 1 | 0 | 5 | 0 | — | | 26 | 1 |
| Schalke 04 | 2014–15 | Bundesliga | 4 | 0 | — | | 1 | 0 | 1 | 0 | — | | 6 | 0 |
| Schalke 04 | Total | | 24 | 1 | — | | 2 | 0 | 6 | 0 | — | | 32 | 1 |
| Olympiacos | 2014–15 | Super League Greece | 5 | 0 | — | | 1 | 0 | 2 (Note: Appearance(s) in UEFA Europa League) | 0 | — | | 8 | 0 |
| Kuban Krasnodar | 2015–16 | Russian Premier League | 9 | 0 | — | | 1 | 0 | — | | 2 (Note: Appearance(s) in Relegation play-offs) | 0 | 12 | 0 |
| Atlético Mineiro | 2017 | Série A | 12 | 1 | 8 | 0 | 2 | 0 | 2 | 0 | 3 (Note: Appearance(s) in Primeira Liga) | 0 | 27 | 1 |
| Atlético Mineiro | 2018 | Série A | 0 | 0 | 1 | 0 | 1 | 0 | 0 | 0 | — | | 2 | 0 |
| Atlético Mineiro | Total | | 12 | 1 | 9 | 0 | 3 | 0 | 2 | 0 | 3 | 0 | 29 | 1 |
| Chapecoense | 2020 | Série B | 9 | 0 | — | | 0 | 0 | — | | — | | 9 | 0 |
| Chapecoense | 2021 | Série A | 10 | 0 | 2 | 0 | 1 | 0 | — | | — | | 13 | 0 |
| Chapecoense | Total | | 19 | 0 | 2 | 0 | 1 | 0 | — | | — | | 22 | 0 |
| Career total | | | 201 | 13 | 45 | 1 | 22 | 2 | 23 | 2 | 6 | 0 | 297 | 18 |

== Honours ==
Borussia Dortmund

- Bundesliga: 2010–11, 2011–12
- DFB-Pokal: 2011–12
- UEFA Champions League runner-up: 2012–13

Olympiacos

- Super League Greece: 2014–15
- Greek Football Cup: 2014–15

Atlético Mineiro

- Campeonato Mineiro: 2017

Chapecoense

- Campeonato Brasileiro Série B: 2020
