= Sagel =

Sagel is a surname. Notable people with the surname include:

- Robby Sagel (born 1995), American soccer player
- Rüdiger Sagel (born 1955), German politician

== See also ==
- Sager
- Segel
