= Sager =

Sager is a German surname of several possible origins. Notable people with the surname include:

- Bobby Sager, entrepreneur turned philanthropist, and inspiration for The Philanthropist television series
- Carole Bayer Sager (born 1944), American lyricist, songwriter, and singer
- Craig Sager (1951–2016), American broadcaster
- Dirk Sager (1940–2014), German journalist
- Gareth Sager (born 1960), British musician
- Lawrence G. Sager (born 1941), American university dean
- Mike Sager (born 1956), American author and journalist
- Pony Sager (1848–1928), American baseball player
- Ruth Sager (1918–1997), American geneticist
- Robert Christopher Sager (1977–2007), American physique model, competitive bodybuilder, and adult film actor
- Sidney Sager (1917–2002), British composer and musician
- Sophie Sager (1825–1902), Swedish and American feminist activist and writer
- Sager orphans, seven orphans on a trek to Oregon in 1844

== See also ==
- Sager House, official residence of the Prime Minister of Sweden
- Saager
- Seger
