= Dren Hodja =

Albanian footballer

Personal information
- Date of birth: 27 March 1994 (age 32)
- Place of birth: Offenbach am Main, Germany
- Height: 1.85 m (6 ft 1 in)
- Position: Attacking midfielder

Youth career
- 2002–2013: Kickers Offenbach
- 2013–2015: Schalke 04

Senior career*
Years	Team	Apps	(Gls)
2013–2015	Schalke 04 II	31	(3)
2015–2016	VfR Aalen	2	(0)
2016–2019	Kickers Offenbach	109	(33)
2019–2020	Bayern Alzenau	18	(3)
2020–2021	FC Gießen	7	(0)
2021	FSV Frankfurt	1	(0)

International career
2014	Albania U21	0	(0)
- * Club domestic league appearances and goals as of 7 August 2021

Dren Hodja (Albanian: Dren Hoxha; born 27 March 1994) is a professional footballer who last played as an attacking midfielder for German club FSV Frankfurt. Born in Germany, he represented Albania at under-21 international level.

== Early life and youth career ==
Hodja was in born in Offenbach am Main, Germany from Kosovo Albanians parents from Kosovo, who migrated in Germany due to the Kosovo War in 1992. His father also was a footballer who played as a forward and was a successful goalscorer. He started his youth career at hometown club Kickers Offenbach in 2002. Following the bankruptcy of Kickers Offenbach he decided to sign with FC Schalke 04 in 2013.

== Club career ==
Hodja started playing with FC Schalke 04 II where he debuted on 28 July 2013 against Rot-Weiß Oberhausen as substitute in the 73rd minute for Olivier Caillas. He scored his first goal for Schalke 04 II on 30 November 2013 in the opening moments of the match which finished as 2–4 loss.

He concluded the first season with 23 appearances, 16 as a starter and 2 goals scored.

On 19 July 2014, Hodja played a friendly match with the Schalke 04 first team and scored a goal in a 3–1 win over Hansa Rostock.

Hodja started with goal in another season with Schalke 04 II the 2014–15 where he played 8 matches and in October 2014 he suffered an injury which kept him out of play until the end of the season.

=== VfR Aalen ===
On 7 July 2015, Hodja signed with a one-year contract with fellow German club VfR Aalen in 3. Liga. He made it his professional debut for VfR Aalen on 5 December 2015 against Werder Bremen II coming on as a substitute in the 84th minute in place of Fabian Menig in a 1–1 draw.

=== Kickers Offenbach ===
On 29 January 2016, Hodja signed a contract with Kickers Offenbach, the club where he started playing football at the age of 8.

== International career ==
Following his goal with the first team of Schalke 04 in a friendly against Hansa Rostock he declared in an interview for Albanian media that he wanted to play for Albania in international level.

Hodja was called up for the friendly match against Romania U21 on 8 October 2014, but among with two other players based in Germany, Valmir Sulejmani and Leart Paqarada, withdrew because of a possible counter-attack by Germany.

Hodja was called up to participate in the international tournament in Dubai, United Arab Emirates on 12–18 November 2014 he would have been unable to join the U-21 national team due to an injury.

== Career statistics ==
=== Club ===
As of 12 November 2017

Appearances and goals by club, season and competition
Club	Season	League			Cup		Europe		Other		Total	
Club	Season	Division	Apps	Goals	Apps	Goals	Apps	Goals	Apps	Goals	Apps	Goals
Schalke 04 II	2013–14	Regionalliga West	23	2	—		—		—		23	2
Schalke 04 II	2014–15	Regionalliga West	8	1	—		—		—		8	1
Schalke 04 II	Total		31	3	—		—		—		31	3
VfR Aalen	2015–16	3. Liga	2	0	0	0	—		—		2	0
Kickers Offenbach	2015–16	Regionalliga Südwest	14	4	2	1	—		—		14	4
Kickers Offenbach	2016–17	Regionalliga Südwest	34	12	2	1	—		—		36	13
Kickers Offenbach	2017–18	Regionalliga Südwest	18	8	—		—		1	0	19	8
Kickers Offenbach	Total		66	24	4	2	—		1	0	68	26
Kickers Offenbach II	2015–16	Landesliga	1	0	—		—		—		1	0
Career total			100	27	4	2	—		1	0	105	29
