= Robert Christopher Sager =

American actor and model (1977–2007)

- Born: Robert Christopher Sager; December 2, 1977; Houston, Texas, U.S.
- Died: February 25, 2007 (aged 29); Las Vegas, Nevada, U.S.
- Other names: Rob Sager; Brett Mycles
- Education: California State University, Northridge
- Occupations: Actor; Model; Bodybuilder
- Years active: 1999–2007
- Agent: Jet Set Productions
- Spouse: Lori A. Barnes (m. 2004; died 2007)

Robert Christopher Sager (December 2, 1977 – February 25, 2007), professionally known by his modeling name Rob Sager and his adult entertainment pseudonym Brett Mycles, was an American physique model, competitive bodybuilder, personal trainer, and adult film actor. Sager became one of the most recognizable physiques in both mainstream fitness catalogs and adult media during the early 2000s. He successfully crossed over between mainstream commercial fashion, fitness education, and the adult entertainment industry before his sudden death at the age of 29.

== Early life and education ==
Robert was born on December 2, 1977, in Houston, Texas, to Christopher Sager and Cynthia Sager. At a young age, his family relocated to Toledo, Ohio, where he spent his childhood and adolescent years. Sager attended local schools in Toledo and developed a passionate interest in weightlifting and physical culture during junior high school, committing himself to an intense bodybuilding regimen early on. Following his graduation from high school, Sager remained in the Toledo area, working various local service and labor jobs to support himself while continuing to train heavily to develop his physique.

In 2001, Sager relocated to Northridge, California, to pursue higher education, enrolling at California State University, Northridge (CSUN). Over the next few years, he split his time between Ohio and Southern California, residing at various intervals in Toledo, Sherman Oaks, and Van Nuys. To supplement his income while attending college and modeling, Sager worked for a residential real estate investment and home remodeling company, gaining experience flipping houses. In 2003, Sager relocated his primary residence from California to Las Vegas, Nevada.

== Career ==
=== Fitness and commercial modeling ===
In 1999, at the age of 22, Sager traveled back to his birth state or regional events to enter the amateur division of the prestigious Arnold Classic bodybuilding competition. While he did not secure a victory at the event, his physical symmetry caught the attention of prominent fitness photographer Irvin Gelb. Gelb photographed Sager for a high-profile editorial layout, an opportunity that effectively launched Sager's professional modeling career.

Sager subsequently moved to Southern California to maximize his industry opportunities. He established a highly successful, long-term creative partnership with renowned physique photographer P. Michael Perez. Throughout the early 2000s, Sager's physique became a mainstay across print media, resulting in cover appearances and featured layouts in prominent publications, including Muscle & Fitness and XY magazine.

His look allowed him to cross over into mainstream commercial fashion modeling. He worked extensively as a print and fit model for the widely circulated International Male clothing catalog and its sister brand, Undergear.

In 2002, Sager reached the peak of his fitness career accolades as he won Male Fitness Model of the Year it was awarded by the digital publication MuscleWeb.com. He won the overall title at the NPC Aloha Muscle & Fitness Bodybuilding Contest in Hawaii, where he also placed 4th in his competitive weight class.

Leveraging his industry fame, Sager became an early entrepreneur in the digital fitness space. He launched an independent lifestyle video and operated an official website, RobSager.com, which served as a platform where he worked as an online personal trainer, dispensing exercise routines, nutritional guidance, and bodybuilding tips directly to fans.

=== Adult entertainment industry ===
Using the stage name Brett Mycles, Sager entered the adult entertainment industry in 2000. He signed an exclusive contract primarily performing for Jet Set Productions. His active film career was brief but highly impactful, spanning exactly two years between 2000 and 2001. He starred in several high-profile feature titles, including Jackhammer, Storm Fighter, and Wrestler for Hire. Sager was notable for performing in both gay and straight adult films, as well as appearing in nude pictorials for gay adult publications.

In addition to film production, Sager worked in alternative athletic media. He participated in internet-based wrestling shoots, fitness matches, and nude wrestling content produced for the physique website All American Guys.

Following 2001, Sager retired from active adult film sets but continued to work independently within the adult escort industry. Throughout his later life, Sager never denounced his time in adult films. In a 2005 interview, he publicly expressed his pride in his entire portfolio, stating that he simply hoped the public would remember and respect his mainstream fitness contributions just as much as they recognized his adult star persona.

In 2009, two years after Sager's death, Jet Set Productions compiled unreleased vault material from his active contract years. The studio released a remastered commemorative feature titled Brett Mycles: Unseen, serving as a final retrospective of his film career.

== Personal life ==
Sager publicly identified as bisexual. In a comprehensive January 2005 interview, he revealed that he had recently married his high school sweetheart, Lori A. Barnes. The couple had originally met in Ohio when Sager was 19 and Barnes was 17, maintaining their relationship across his multi-state career transitions.

== Death ==
On Sunday, February 25, 2007, Sager died suddenly in his sleep at his home in Las Vegas, Nevada, at the age of 29. The cause of death was determined to be congestive heart failure. According to accounts from family and close friends, Sager had begun complaining of irregular heartbeats and cardiac discomfort in the weeks prior to his passing, noting to loved ones that his family possessed a medical history of congenital heart complications.

== Filmography ==
=== Film ===
Year	Title	Role	Notes
2000	Prime Cut Video Magazine 5	Brett	Debut
2001	Prime Cut Video Magazine 6: Reunion of the Stars	Brett	Jet Set Entertainment
2001	Wrestler for Hire	Brett	Can-Am Productions
2001	Storm Fighter	Fighter	Can-Am Productions
2001	College Jocks 2	Jock	
2001	Jackhammer	Jack	
2001	Brett Mycles: Unseen	Brett Mycles	
2001	Dante's Champions Live!	Wrester	
2003	Dante 1: The Collector's Edition	Brett	Jet Set Productions
2003	Brett Mycles: The Collector's Edition	Brett	
2004	Dante 2	Brett	
2011	Boys Next Door 1	Brett	Posthumous release
2013	Boys Next Door 2	Brett Mycles	Posthumous release

== Awards and nominations ==
Year	Award	Category	Title	Result	Ref
2002	MuscleWeb.com Awards	Male Fitness Model of the Year	Himself	Won	
2002	GayVN Awards	Best Solo Performance	Prime Cut Video Magazine Vol #5	Nominated	
