= Bajram Sadrijaj =

Kosovar footballer

Personal information
- Date of birth: 10 August 1986 (age 40)
- Place of birth: Augsburg, West Germany
- Position: Striker

Youth career
- 1994–2004: TSG Thannhausen
- 2004–2005: FC Memmingen

Senior career*
Years	Team	Apps	(Gls)
2005–2008	TSG Thannhausen	63	(41)
2008–2010	Borussia Dortmund II	10	(3)
2008–2010	Borussia Dortmund	3	(0)
2013	TSG Thannhausen	10	(1)
2013–2014	SC Bubesheim	9	(2)
2014–2015	Türkiyemspor Krumbach	2	(0)
2015–2016	TSV Ziemetshausen	1	(0)
2017–2019	FV Bosporus Thannhausen	0	(0)
- * Club domestic league appearances and goals

Bajram Sadrijaj (born 10 August 1986) is a Kosovar footballer who most recently played for FV Bosporus Thannhausen.

== Career ==
Born in Augsburg, he played for TSG Thannhausen, FC Memmingen and Borussia Dortmund before he was forced to retire due to injuries sustained in a car crash in 2010. He returned to football in 2013 for his first professional club and later played for SC Bubesheim before joining Türkiyemspor Krumbach.
