= Neven Subotić =

Serbian footballer (born 1988)

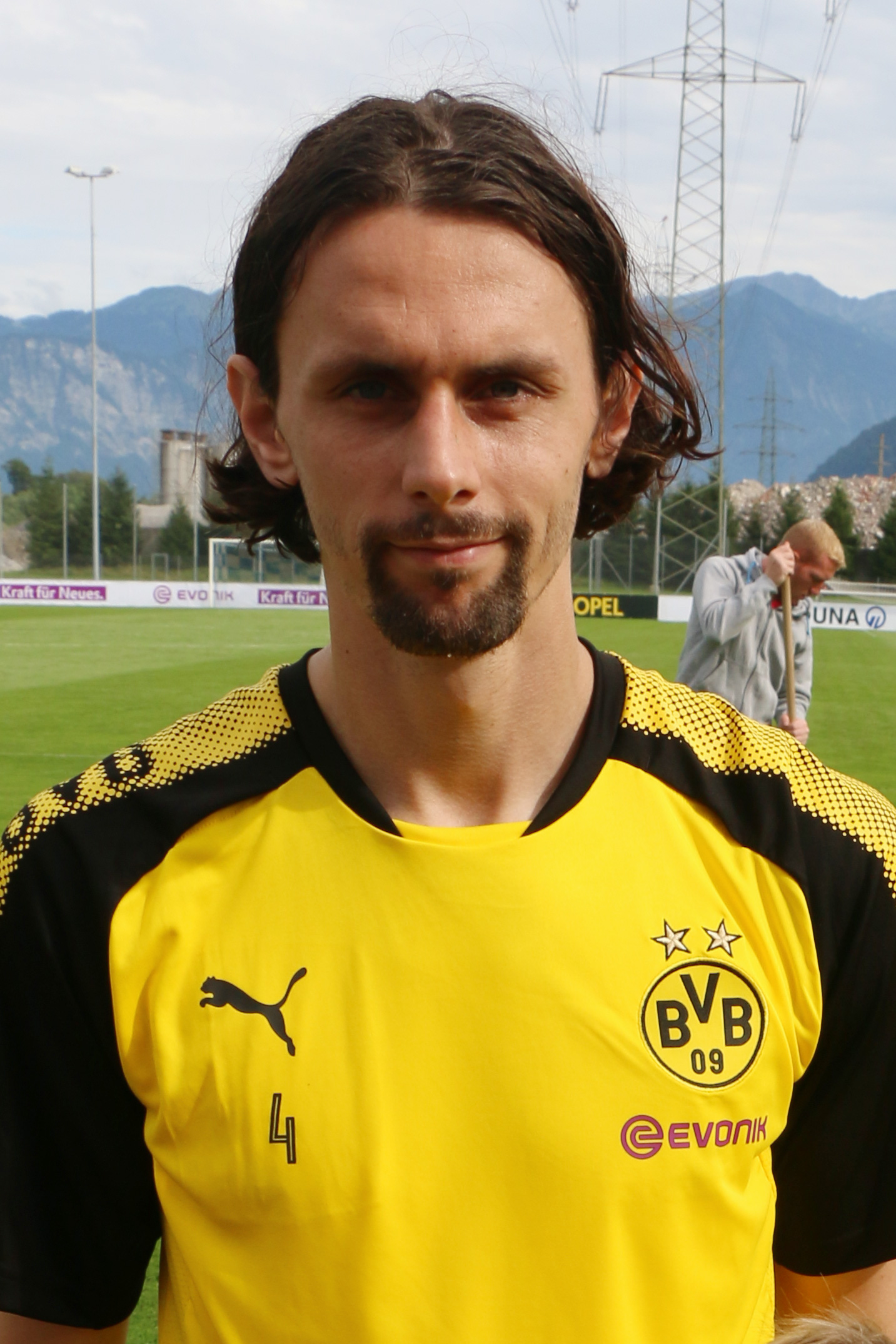
- Subotić with Borussia Dortmund in 2017

Personal information
- Date of birth: 10 December 1988 (age 37)
- Place of birth: Banja Luka, SR Bosnia and Herzegovina, Yugoslavia
- Height: 1.93 m (6 ft 4 in)
- Position: Centre-back

Youth career
- 1994–1999: TSV Schwarzenberg
- 1999–2000: Sparta United SC
- 2000–2001: Impact United SC
- 2002–2003: Manatee Magic SC
- 2003–2004: Braden River SC
- 2004–2005: IMG Soccer Academy
- 2006–2007: Mainz 05

College career
Years	Team	Apps	(Gls)
2006	South Florida Bulls	0	(0)

Senior career*
Years	Team	Apps	(Gls)
2006–2007	Mainz 05 II	23	(3)
2007–2008	Mainz 05	34	(4)
2008–2018	Borussia Dortmund	196	(15)
2016	→ Borussia Dortmund II (loan)	2	(1)
2017	→ 1. FC Köln (loan)	12	(0)
2018–2019	Saint-Étienne	42	(3)
2019–2020	Union Berlin	23	(1)
2020–2021	Denizlispor	5	(1)
2021	Rheindorf Altach	10	(0)
Total		347	(29)

International career
2005	United States U17	10	(0)
2006	United States U20	2	(0)
2009–2013	Serbia	36	(2)
- * Club domestic league appearances and goals

Neven Subotić (Serbian Cyrillic: Невен Суботић, pronounced [něʋen sǔbotitɕ]; born 10 December 1988) is a former professional footballer who played as a centre-back. Born in Bosnia and Herzegovina, he played for the Serbia national team.

Subotić made his professional debut in 2007 for 1. FSV Mainz 05. In the following year, he signed with Borussia Dortmund, where he spent the majority of his career, winning two Bundesliga titles. After leaving Dortmund in 2017, he had a series of spells at clubs in Germany, France, and Turkey, before signing for SC Rheindorf Altach in January 2021.

Born to Bosnian Serb parents, Subotić lived in Germany and the United States during his youth and played for the latter nation at under-17 and under-20 levels. At the senior level, he elected to represent Serbia, making his full international debut in 2009 and appearing at the 2010 FIFA World Cup.

== Early life ==
Born in Banja Luka, Bosnia and Herzegovina, to Bosnian Serb parents, father Željko from the village of Kulaši and mother Svjetlana from Brestovo, Subotić spent his early childhood in Prnjavor. In 1990, when Subotić was two years old, his father went to Germany in search of work. In 1994, with the Bosnian War raging, the rest of the family including five-year-old Neven, his sister and their mother joined their father in Germany, settling in Schömberg. Neven took up football at the age of seven with the local outfit TSV Schwarzenberg.

In the late 1990s, the Subotić family's residence authorisation in Germany expired, and in order to avoid being deported back to Bosnia, they opted to move to the United States in 1999. They settled in Salt Lake City, Utah, where Subotić's father had a cousin. Subotić played football with Sparta Gold and Impact Black youth clubs.

Within two years, the family was on the move again, this time to Bradenton, Florida, so that Subotić's sister Natalija could pursue a tennis career at the Nick Bollettieri Tennis Academy. The city also happens to be the base for the United States under-17 national team. Subotić trained on his own in G.T. Bray Park, where he got spotted by Keith Fulk, one of the American team's assistant coaches who then informed the team's head coach, John Ellinger, about Subotić. After arranging a tryout, they offered Subotić a spot in the residency camp. At the time, he was not attached to any club sides, but eventually started playing with the University of South Florida soccer team.

While playing with the under-17 team in the Netherlands, Subotić was approached by player agent Steve Kelly, who inquired about his career plans and offered the possibility of playing in Europe. After impressing at the tryout for 1. FSV Mainz 05, young Subotić was on his way there, initially playing for the club's youth and fourth-division teams (1. FSV Mainz 05 II). Subotić holds a German, American, Bosnian, and a Serbian passport.

== Club career ==
=== Mainz 05 ===
Subotić made his professional debut for 1. FSV Mainz 05 in the last match of the 2006–07 season against Bayern Munich, as his team was relegated from the Bundesliga. In the 2. Bundesliga the following season, he seized a starting role in what was the league's best defence, conceding only 37 goals. The team finished in fourth place, missing the promotion back to Bundesliga by only two points.

In the 2008 summer off-season, Mainz head coach Jürgen Klopp got a job coaching Borussia Dortmund and was instrumental in bringing Subotić along with him.

=== Borussia Dortmund ===
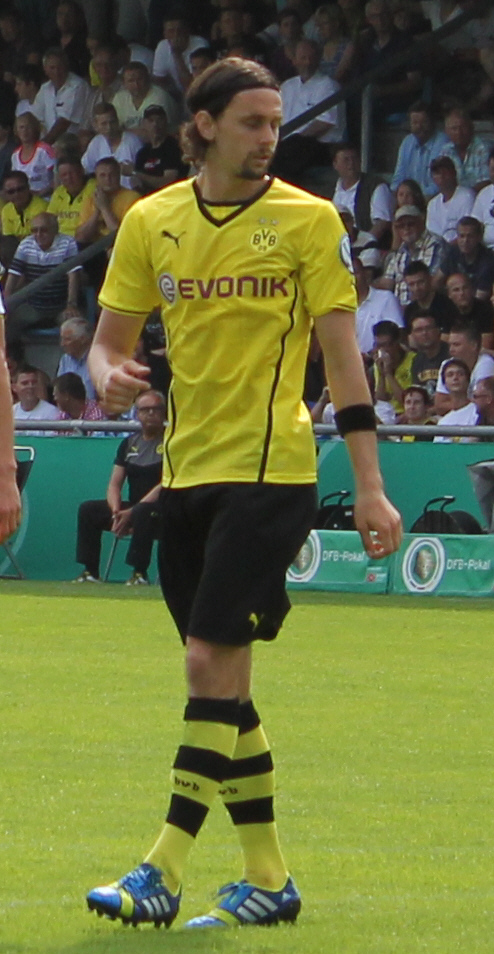
Subotić in action for Borussia Dortmund in 2013

On 4 June 2008, it was announced that Subotić had signed with Borussia Dortmund on a five-year contract. He debuted for his new club in the unofficial DFL-Supercup match against Bayern Munich, which Dortmund won 2–1. Subotić's defensive displays quickly turned a lot of heads. In December 2008, he was named in the ideal XI team of the first part of the 2008–09 Bundesliga season, alongside such defensive stars as Lúcio and Philipp Lahm. In addition to confident and effective defensive displays far beyond his years, Subotić was also a factor on the offensive end, scoring six league goals throughout the season.

In June 2009, he signed a new contract that lasts until the summer of 2014. In the 2009–10 Bundesliga season, Subotić was one of only four players in the entire league to play every minute of every league match.

On 15 December 2010, Subotić scored his first-ever goal in the European competition, scoring a header off a corner at Sevilla in the Europa League to tie the score at 2–2. The match was a decider on which of the two teams would go on from the group stage, as Borussia needed to win away while Sevilla was fine even with a draw. It ended 2–2, however, and Borussia was eliminated.

On 27 July 2013, Subotić won the 2013 DFL-Supercup with Dortmund 4–2 against rivals Bayern Munich.

On 27 May 2015 he signed a new contract until the end of the 2017–18.

On 1 April 2016, it was announced that Subotić would miss the remainder of Dortmund's season as he was suffering from thrombosis in his arm. On 26 June 2016, Subotić confirmed that he planned to leave the club. He moved temporarily on 26 January 2017 on loan to Bundesliga rivals 1. FC Köln until the end of the season.

At the start of the 2017–18 season, he was brought back into the Dortmund team under the new manager Peter Bosz.

=== Saint-Étienne ===
On 25 January 2018, Subotić signed an 18-month contract with Ligue 1 outfit AS Saint-Étienne.

On 1 July 2019, he left the club when his contract expired.

=== Union Berlin ===
On 4 July 2019, Subotić returned to the Bundesliga, in which he signed for the newly promoted Union Berlin. In August 2020, he agreed the termination of his contract which was due to expire in 2021.

=== Denizlispor ===
On 18 September 2020, Subotić joined Süper Lig club Denizlispor. On 22 January 2021, the club announced that he had decided to cancel his contract unilaterally. He left having made five league appearances and scored once, the opening goal in a 2–1 away win over Gençlerbirliği on 19 October.

=== SC Rheindorf Altach ===
On 1 February 2021, Subotić joined Austrian Football Bundesliga club SC Rheindorf Altach on a six-month contract.

Subotić announced his retirement in 2022.

== International career ==
=== Youth level ===
Subotić was part of the squad selected and coached by John Hackworth for the U.S. entry in the 2005 FIFA U-17 World Championship during September 2005 in Peru. Sixteen years of age at the time, he entered all three group matches as a substitute during the final five minutes. In the quarter-final versus the Netherlands, where the U.S. team lost 0–2 and were eliminated, he played from the start but received a red card in the 73rd minute.

He has also made two appearances for the USA U-20 team. What would prove to be his last one took place in November 2006 in a friendly after which head coach Thomas Rongen criticised Subotić, who had signed for Mainz several months earlier, for "not accelerating over there to the point where we feel he belongs on the [U.S.] team." Next summer, Rongen controversially did not select him to play in the 2007 U-20 World Cup in Canada, picking defenders such as Nathan Sturgis, Anthony Wallace, Julian Valentin, Ofori Sarkodie, Tim Ward, and Amaechi Igwe ahead of Subotić, a decision that has resulted in Rongen receiving a fair amount of criticism. While Rongen insisted that a groin injury was to blame, there has been considerable speculation since then that Subotić was so stung by Rongen's criticism that he decided to reconsider his international future:

Well, Rongen certainly said some discouraging and false things about me. Never in my life have I heard that a high-level coach publicly criticizes a player. Professional coaches do that one-on-one with the player. I find this disappointing, because a few months later after Rongen said I was not good enough for the U-20s, I played a very good season and started getting calls from various countries [U.S. included] for the full men's team. I still don't know what he saw in the other players, and what he didn't see in me.

=== Full squad ===
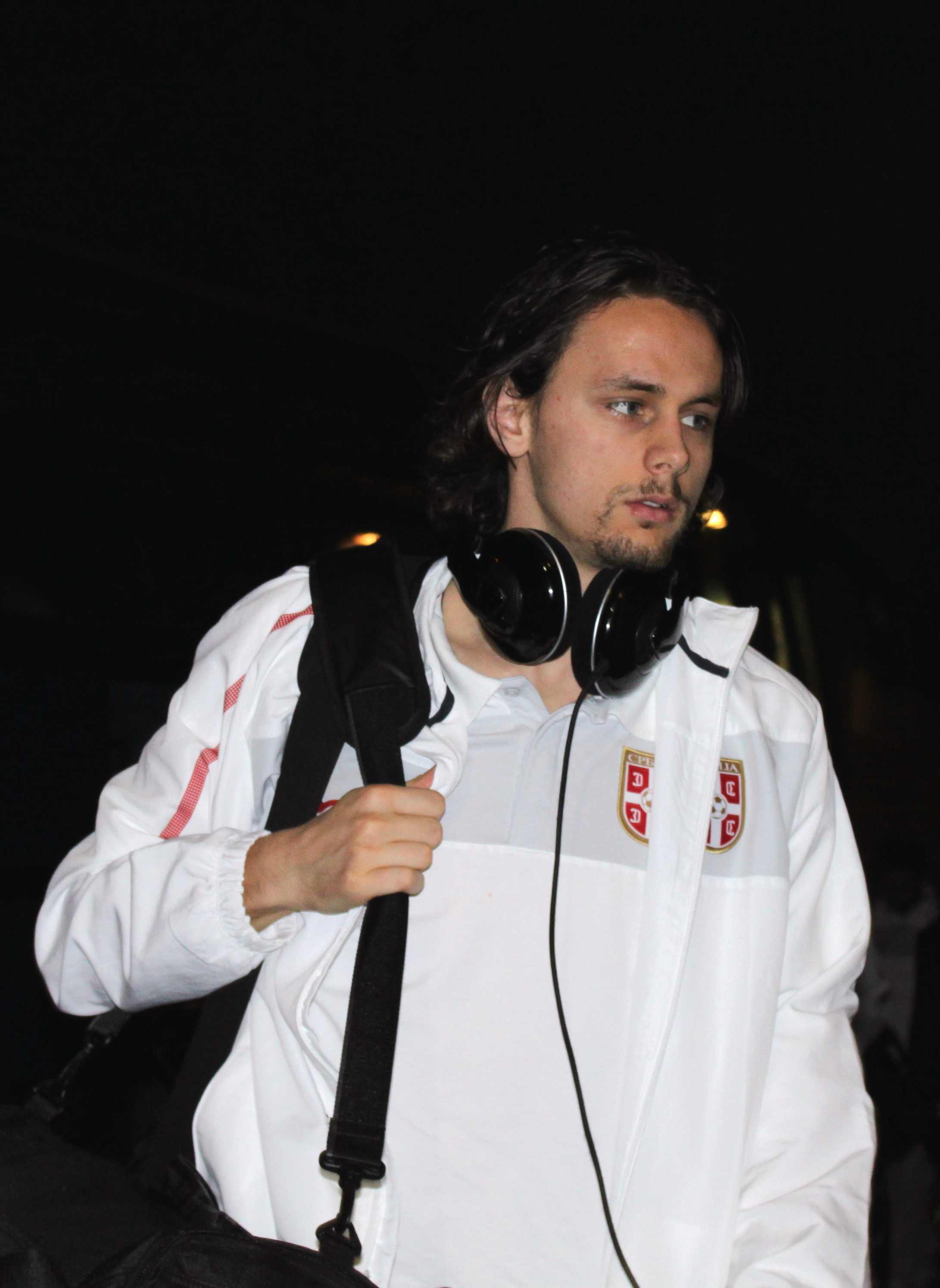
Subotić with Serbia in 2010

Subotić was eligible to represent the United States, Serbia, or Bosnia and Herzegovina. During September 2008, when the issue of his national team eligibility first started getting wider coverage in the football media, playing for Croatia or even Germany were mentioned as possibilities as well. Both options, however, were soon revealed to be media concoctions more than anything else. Bosnia and Herzegovina fell out of the running early as Subotić publicly rejected overtures by the country's football officials and head coach Miroslav Blažević.

By late fall 2008, it became clear that only Serbia figured in his international choice. Citing sources close to Subotić's family, many reports in the Serbian press appeared about his decision to play for Serbia already being made, but waiting for the right moment to state it publicly since he had until 10 December 2009 (his 21st birthday) to declare his choice. In mid-December 2008, Subotić informed national team head coach Radomir Antić about his decision to represent Serbia. Then in late December 2008, Subotić notified the US Soccer Federation about his decision, the first official step in the process of changing national team attachment.

=== 2010 World Cup qualifying ===
On 28 March 2009, Subotić made his debut for the Serbia national team in a 2010 World Cup qualifier against Romania in Constanţa that Serbia won 2–3. Coming on as a 65th-minute substitute for striker Marko Pantelić with Serbia leading 1–3, Subotić played the slightly altered central defensive role as Antić looked to protect the lead for the remaining 30 minutes in the crucial qualifying match. Afterward, head coach Antić was very supportive of his new young defender, comparing him to Fernando Hierro. After starting against Sweden in a friendly, Subotić's first competitive start took place against Austria on 6 June just after the end of the club season, partnering Nemanja Vidić in central defence (if only for one half, since Vidić got injured and replaced by Antonio Rukavina) — the contest in which Serbia displayed a very lethargic overall team effort and was lucky to win 1–0 after numerous defensive breakdowns. Four days later, on 10 June 2009, Subotić scored his first goal for Serbia in a fairly straightforward 2–0 win over the Faroe Islands. For the next qualifying match, at the end of summer against France, Serbia's chance to seal qualification by winning at home, Subotić got benched and did not enter the contest at all, as Antić preferred Aleksandar Luković to partner Vidić on this occasion. The same central defensive pairing started the next qualifier against Romania at home (another chance to automatically qualify with a win after failing to beat the French), while Subotić got a chance to run out for the last 15 minutes as a sub for Vidić with the score 2–0 for Serbia as it eventually clinched the World Cup spot with a 5–0 thrashing. In the last meaningless qualifier against Lithuania, Subotić played the full 90 minutes in a free role on the wing as Antić looked to experiment and try different setups without any fear of dropping points.

Though he came in with high praise and even higher hopes, Subotić's initial performances for Serbia weren't stellar. Following unconvincing defensive displays and fairly frequent mistakes, he had to deal with plenty of criticism in the Serbian press.

=== 2010 World Cup ===
At the 2010 FIFA World Cup in South Africa, Subotić was left out of the starting line-up for the opening group stage match against Ghana, with Nemanja Vidić and Aleksandar Luković the preferred choices for central defensive spots by coach Antić. Subotić's benching came as a result of his poor starting displays in the friendlies leading up to the World Cup against New Zealand, Poland, and Cameroon. During the second half of the Ghana match, however, Luković received a red card and was sent off, forcing Antić to bring Subotić into the game for the remaining 14 minutes.

Due to Luković's one-match suspension as a result of the red card, Subotić started the next match in a must-win situation versus Germany, putting in a confident and effective performance against German forwards who despite mounting great pressure spells throughout the match ultimately failed to score as Serbia recorded a famous 1–0 win. Playing against the players he knew well from Bundesliga, Subotić showed excellent positional play with several crucial reactions, including the clearance in front of Mesut Özil to prevent the rebound following goalkeeper Vladimir Stojković's penalty save on Lukas Podolski.

For the group decider against Australia, Subotić was back on the bench as Luković returned from suspension.

=== Euro 2012 qualifying ===
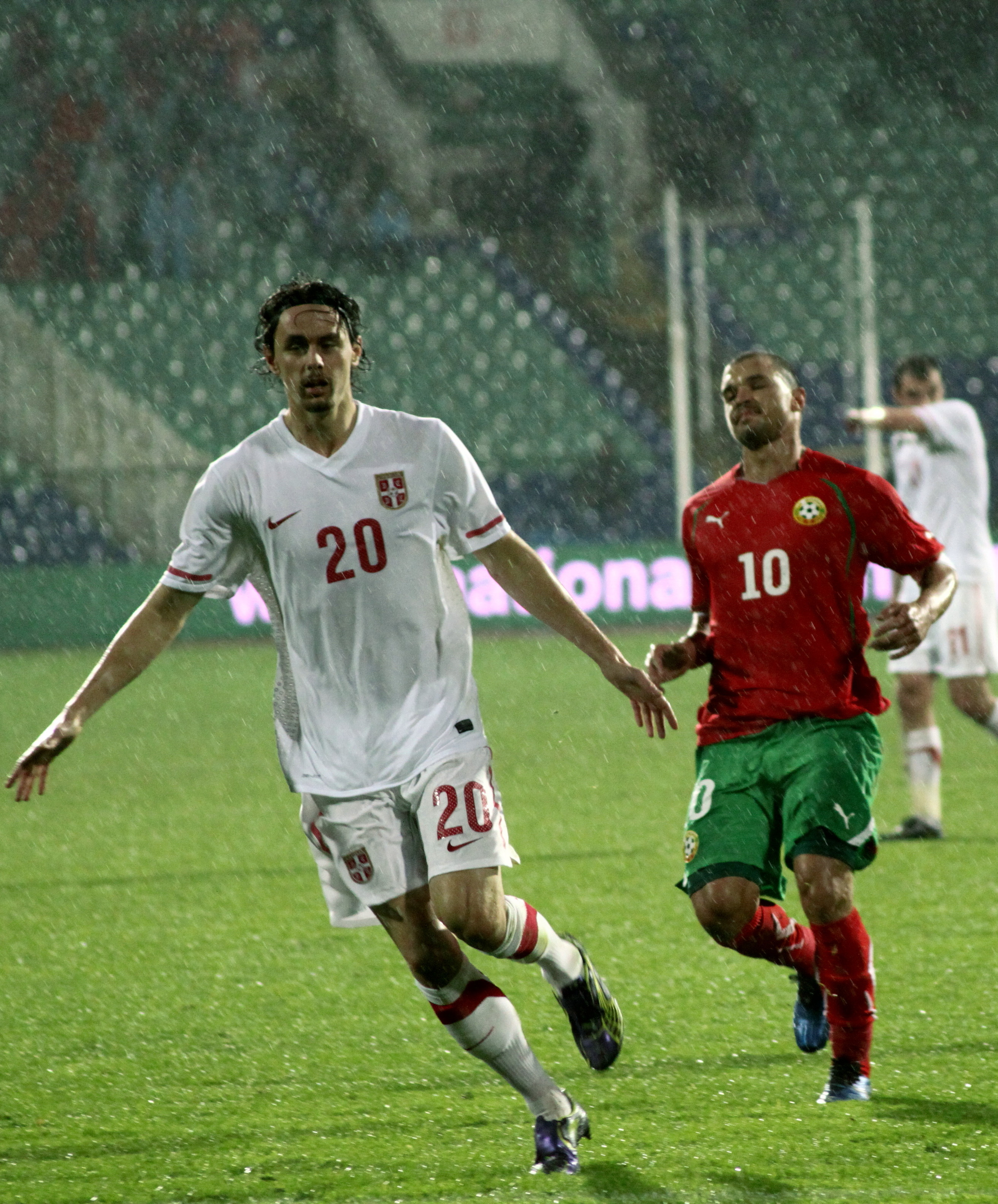
Subotić playing for Serbia in November 2010

Subotić returned to the starting line-up for the UEFA Euro 2012 qualifiers that began under beleaguered head coach Antić, who was serving a four-match touchline ban as a result of the verbal altercation with the Uruguayan referee at the World Cup. The youngster played the full 90 minutes at the Faroe Islands in the opener and also in the following match versus Slovenia. Subotić's somewhat inconsistent form continued as he established a strong presence in central defence with Vidić, but also the duo's hesitant reaction to Milivoje Novaković's run off the ball led to the Slovenian go-ahead goal. Following the Slovenian draw, Antić was fired and Pižon Petrović took over the job. Subotić got called up for the new coach's debut match against Estonia, but was an unused sub as Serbia disastrously lost a competitive match at home for the first time in nine years. Petrović gave Subotić a starting assignment for the next qualifier away at Italy in October 2010, but the infamous contest in Genoa got interrupted after six minutes due to rioting by the travelling Serbian hooligans, which resulted in an automatic 3–0 loss for Serbia.

As the qualifying resumed in late March 2011, Subotić got the start at home against Northern Ireland. Since center-back Luković announced his retirement from international football before this match, 22-year-old Subotić essentially became an automatic first-team choice. However, partnering Milan Biševac in central defence (on instead of injured Vidić), Subotić again had a shaky performance as the duo failed to properly deal with Chris Brunt's set-piece cross that led to Gareth McAuley's headed goal. Furthermore, Subotić picked up an injury during the match that ruled him out of the next qualifier four days later at Estonia.

=== 2014 World Cup qualifying ===
With Siniša Mihajlović's May 2012 arrival to the head coaching post, Subotić featured in a few preparation friendlies and even scored a goal in the loss to Sweden, but was omitted from the final friendly at home versus the Republic of Ireland reportedly due to injury.

Once the 2014 World Cup qualifying cycle began in September 2012, Subotić was benched for the opening match away at Scotland as the duo of Biševac and 19-year-old Matija Nastasić got the nod in central defence. Three days later, at home versus Wales, the same situation repeated.

The following qualifier was a big test at home versus group favourites Belgium, and it still brought no change in Subotić's status, as Mihajlović continued with Nastasić and Biševac as his preferred central defenders. Despite creating many opportunities, Serbia failed to convert them, losing the match 0–3 in the end. The heartbreaking loss brought Mihajlović media criticism, including that over his continual omission of Subotić. Four days later, however, playing Macedonia away in Skopje in a must-win situation, Mihajlović once again left Subotić on the bench without a minute of action. In a match of poor quality, amid reports of discord within the squad stemming from the Belgium loss, Serbia conceded a late penalty and disastrously lost 0–1 thus almost losing a chance of getting one of the top two spots in the group with only four points from four match at the winter break.

Throughout October 2012, Subotić continued with stellar performances for Borussia, both in the Champions League and in the Bundesliga, leading to more questions and criticism for Mihajlović in the Serbian press over continually leaving the player on the bench in national team matches. Asked about it explicitly in interviews, Mihajlović said, "Subotić missed the final friendly versus Ireland because of injury. He was supposed to start against Scotland, but out of the five training sessions we held leading up to the match, he did very poorly at two of them. I decided to give Biševac a chance in the match at Hampden Park and he was excellent. Then, before the Belgium match, I said a had two question marks over the starting lineup and one of them was if I should start Subotić. Now Biševac picked up a second yellow card of the qualifying, and Neven will start the next match in March versus Croatia, if he shows commitment in training, of course. It is now up to him to make that spot his again. The second part of the problem is that both Subotić and Nastasić aren't very vocal during matches, Biševac is the only one who talks and commands the back line. Neven is a very important player for us, and of course, I'm counting on him, but these things happen – I had it happen to me as a player on the occasion that a spot competitor on the squad makes the most of an opportunity coach gave him thus relegating me temporarily to the bench to wait for my next opportunity."

=== Euro 2016 qualifying ===
Subotić did not play in qualification matches for Euro 2016. After new Serbian coach Dick Advocaat announced his squad for qualifying rounds against Armenia and Albania, he also announced that Subotić may have finished his international career. He has earned a total of 36 caps, scoring 2 goals and his final international was a September 2013 World Cup qualification match against Croatia.

== Other activities ==
In 2010, Subotić recorded a dance song called "Kings of Africa" along with Serbian rapper Filip Filipi.

He founded the Neven Subotić Foundation in 2012, which works on realisation of the human right for access to clean water, with a particular focus in Ethiopia.

== Career statistics ==
=== Club ===
Appearances and goals by club, season and competition
Club	Season	League			Cup (Note: Includes DFB-Pokal, Coupe de France and Coupe de la Ligue.)		Continental (Note: Includes UEFA Champions League and UEFA Europa League.)		Other (Note: Includes DFL-Supercup.)		Total	
Club	Season	League	Apps	Goals	Apps	Goals	Apps	Goals	Apps	Goals	Apps	Goals
Mainz 05 II	2006–07	Oberliga Südwest	23	3	—		—		—		23	3
Mainz 05	2006–07	Bundesliga	1	0	0	0	—		—		1	0
Mainz 05	2007–08	2. Bundesliga	33	4	1	0	—		—		34	4
Mainz 05	Total		34	4	1	0	—		—		35	4
Borussia Dortmund	2008–09	Bundesliga	33	6	3	0	2	0	—		38	6
Borussia Dortmund	2009–10	Bundesliga	34	3	3	0	—		—		37	6
Borussia Dortmund	2010–11	Bundesliga	31	1	2	1	8	1	—		41	3
Borussia Dortmund	2011–12	Bundesliga	25	0	5	0	4	0	0	0	34	0
Borussia Dortmund	2012–13	Bundesliga	25	3	4	0	11	0	1	0	41	3
Borussia Dortmund	2013–14	Bundesliga	10	0	1	0	4	0	1	0	16	0
Borussia Dortmund	2014–15	Bundesliga	28	2	5	1	7	0	0	0	40	3
Borussia Dortmund	2015–16	Bundesliga	6	0	0	0	5	0	—		11	0
Borussia Dortmund	2017–18	Bundesliga	4	0	0	0	1	0	—		5	0
Borussia Dortmund	Total		196	15	23	2	42	1	2	0	263	18
Borussia Dortmund II	2016–17	Regionalliga West	2	1	0	0	—		—		2	1
1. FC Köln (loan)	2016–17	Bundesliga	12	0	0	0	—		—		12	0
Saint-Étienne	2017–18	Ligue 1	16	2	0	0	—		—		16	2
Saint-Étienne	2018–19	Ligue 1	26	1	2	0	—		—		28	1
Saint-Étienne	Total		42	3	2	0	—		—		44	3
Union Berlin	2019–20	Bundesliga	23	1	0	0	—		—		23	1
Denizlispor	2020–21	Süper Lig	5	1	0	0	—		—		5	1
Rheindorf Altach	2020–21	Austrian Bundesliga	10	0	—		—		—		10	0
Career total			347	29	26	2	42	1	2	0	417	32

=== International ===
Appearances and goals by national team and year
National team	Year	Apps	Goals
Serbia	2009	9	1
Serbia	2010	11	0
Serbia	2011	8	0
Serbia	2012	3	1
Serbia	2013	5	0
Total		36	2

Scores and results list Serbia's goal tally first, score column indicates score after each Subotić goal.

List of international goals scored by Neven Subotić
No.	Date	Venue	Opponent	Score	Result	Competition
1	10 June 2009	Tórsvøllur, Tórshavn, Faroe Islands	Faroe Islands	2–0	2–0	2010 FIFA World Cup Qualification
2	5 June 2012	Råsundastadion, Solna, Sweden	Sweden	1–1	1–2	Friendly

== Honours ==
Borussia Dortmund

- Bundesliga: 2010–11, 2011–12
- DFB-Pokal: 2011–12
- DFL-Supercup: 2013, 2014
- UEFA Champions League runner-up: 2012–13
