= Christopher Kullmann =

German footballer (born 1986)

Personal information
- Date of birth: 19 September 1986 (age 40)
- Place of birth: Katzhütte, East Germany
- Height: 1.87 m (6 ft 2 in)
- Position: Forward

Youth career
- –1999: FSV 1920 Sargstedt
- 1999–2005: 1. FC Magdeburg

Senior career*
Years	Team	Apps	(Gls)
2005–2008	1. FC Magdeburg	86	(16)
2008–2011	Borussia Dortmund II	83	(21)
2009–2011	Borussia Dortmund	7	(0)
2011–2012	RW Oberhausen	18	(4)
2012–2013	Arminia Bielefeld	11	(1)
2013–2014	FC Homburg	7	(2)
2014	KSV Hessen Kassel	13	(2)
2014–2016	Germania Halberstadt	38	(6)
2016–2019	Askania Bernburg	49	(16)
Total		312	(68)
- * Club domestic league appearances and goals

Christopher Kullmann (born 19 September 1986) is a German former professional footballer who played as a forward.

== Career ==
Kullmann was born in Katzhütte. He played his first Bundesliga match for Borussia Dortmund, and first fully professional game, on 15 February 2009 in a 1–1 draw against Energie Cottbus. He was substituted in the 90th minute. On 27 April 2009, the 22-year-old striker signed a professional contract with Borussia Dortmund that kept at the club until 30 June 2011.
