= 2012 UEFA European Under-17 Championship squads =

The 2012 UEFA European Under-17 Football Championship was an international under-17 age group football tournament held in Slovenia from 4 May until 16 May 2012. The eight national teams involved in the tournament are required to register a squad of 18 players; only players in these squads are eligible to take part in the tournament.

Before the start of the tournament, the UEFA administration provides all participating teams with an official form which must be completed with the 18 players participating in the tournament. Two of these 18 players must be goalkeepers. The form must be accompanied by the 18 selected players' passports to prove they are eligible for the tournament.

Any injured or sick goalkeepers and a maximum of two injured or sick players may be replaced upon submission of written medical evidence and approved by the UEFA doctor on duty at the tournament. Replaced players can take no further part in the tournament.

The 18 players must wear set numbers between 1 and 23. No number may be used by more than one player in the course of the tournament. For all matches played in the tournament, players must wear the number indicated on the official list of 18 players.

Players in boldface have been capped at full international level at some point in their career.

== Group A ==
=== France ===
Head coach: (France) Jean-Claude Giuntini

No.	Pos.	Player	Date of birth (age)	Caps	Club
1	GK	**Mike Maignan** (c)	3 July 1995 (aged 16)	9	(France) Paris Saint-Germain
2	DF	Yarouba Cissako	8 January 1995 (aged 17)	8	(France) Monaco
3	DF	Rémi Walter	26 April 1995 (aged 17)	6	(France) Nancy
4	DF	Brian Landini	1 January 1995 (aged 17)	8	(France) Le Havre
5	DF	**Clément Lenglet**	17 June 1995 (aged 16)	11	(France) Nancy
6	MF	**Seko Fofana**	7 May 1995 (aged 16)	9	(France) Lorient
7	MF	Corentin Jean	15 July 1995 (aged 16)	9	(France) Troyes
8	DF	Franck-Yves Bambock	7 April 1995 (aged 17)	6	(France) Paris Saint-Germain
9	FW	Wesley Saïd	19 April 1995 (aged 17)	5	(France) Rennes
10	MF	Mohamed Chemlal	8 February 1995 (aged 17)	6	(France) Caen
11	FW	Hervin Ongenda	24 June 1995 (aged 16)	6	(France) Paris Saint-Germain
12	MF	**Thomas Lemar**	12 November 1995 (aged 16)	10	(France) Caen
13	DF	Louis Nganioni	3 June 1995 (aged 16)	6	(France) Lyon
14	FW	**Anthony Martial**	5 December 1995 (aged 16)	11	(France) Lyon
15	DF	**Jean-Charles Castelletto**	26 January 1995 (aged 17)	7	(France) Auxerre
16	GK	Axel Kacou	1 August 1995 (aged 16)	0	(France) Saint-Étienne
17	MF	Zakarie Labidi	8 February 1995 (aged 17)	10	(France) Lyon
18	MF	**Jonathan Mexique**	10 March 1995 (aged 17)	6	(France) Le Mans

=== Iceland ===
Head coach: (Iceland) Gunnar Gudmundsson

No.	Pos.	Player	Date of birth (age)	Caps	Club
1	GK	**Rúnar Alex Rúnarsson**	18 February 1995 (aged 17)	—	(Iceland) KR Reykjavík
2	DF	**Adam Örn Arnarson**	27 August 1995 (aged 16)	—	(Iceland) Breiðablik
3	DF	Ósvald Traustason	22 October 1995 (aged 16)	—	(Iceland) Breiðablik
4	MF	**Orri Sigurdur Ómarsson**	18 February 1995 (aged 17)	—	(Denmark) Aarhus GF
5	DF	**Hjörtur Hermannsson**	8 February 1995 (aged 17)	—	(Iceland) Fylkir Reykjavik
6	MF	Emil Ásmundsson	8 January 1995 (aged 17)	—	(Iceland) Fylkir Reykjavik
7	MF	Ævar Ingi Jóhannesson	31 January 1995 (aged 17)	—	(Iceland) KA Akureyri
8	MF	**Oliver Sigurjónsson**	3 March 1995 (aged 17)	—	(Denmark) Aarhus GF
9	FW	Stefán Þór Pálsson	31 May 1995 (aged 16)	—	(Iceland) Breiðablik
10	MF	**Kristján Flóki Finnbogason**	12 January 1995 (aged 17)	—	(Iceland) FH Hafnarfjörður
11	MF	Páll Þorsteinsson	30 October 1995 (aged 16)	—	(Iceland) Breiðablik
12	GK	Fannar Hafsteinsson	30 June 1995 (aged 16)	—	(Iceland) KA Akureyri
13	FW	Gunnlaugur Birgisson	4 June 1995 (aged 16)	—	(Iceland) Breiðablik
14	DF	Ingiberg Jónsson	3 March 1995 (aged 17)	—	(Iceland) Breiðablik
15	MF	Aron Heiðdal	30 January 1995 (aged 17)	—	(Iceland) Stjarnan
16	MF	Sindri Björnsson	29 March 1995 (aged 17)	—	(Iceland) Leiknir Reykjavík
17	FW	**Elías Már Ómarsson**	18 January 1995 (aged 17)	—	(Iceland) Keflavík
18	DF	Daði Bergsson	11 March 1995 (aged 17)	—	(Iceland) Throttur

=== Georgia ===
Head coach: (Georgia (country)) Vasil Maisuradze

No.	Pos.	Player	Date of birth (age)	Caps	Club
1	GK	Aleksandre Adamia	9 April 1995 (aged 17)	—	(Georgia (country)) Metalurgi Rustavi
2	MF	**Otar Kakabadze**	27 June 1995 (aged 16)	—	(Georgia (country)) Dinamo Tbilisi
3	DF	**Lasha Dvali**	14 May 1995 (aged 16)	—	(Georgia (country)) Metalurgi Rustavi
4	DF	Nika Chanturia	19 January 1995 (aged 17)	—	(Georgia (country)) Lokomotivi Tbilisi
5	DF	Giga Samkharadze	28 April 1995 (aged 17)	—	(Georgia (country)) Dinamo Tbilisi
6	MF	Chiaber Chechelashvili	10 October 1995 (aged 16)	—	(Georgia (country)) Dinamo Tbilisi
7	MF	**Giorgi Aburjania**	31 January 1995 (aged 17)	—	(Georgia (country)) Metalurgi Rustavi
8	MF	**Giorgi Papunashvili**	2 September 1995 (aged 16)	—	(Georgia (country)) Dinamo Tbilisi
9	FW	Vano Tsilosani	9 November 1995 (aged 16)	—	(Georgia (country)) Dinamo Tbilisi
10	MF	Nika Akhvlediani	20 May 1995 (aged 16)	—	(Georgia (country)) Baia Zugdidi
11	FW	Dato Dartsimelia	28 January 1995 (aged 17)	—	(Georgia (country)) Lokomotivi Tbilisi
12	GK	Nika Shermadini	8 January 1995 (aged 17)	—	(Georgia (country)) Metalurgi Rustavi
13	MF	**Mate Tsintsadze**	7 January 1995 (aged 17)	—	(Georgia (country)) Lokomotivi Tbilisi
14	FW	Davit Jikia	10 January 1995 (aged 17)	—	(Georgia (country)) Lokomotivi Tbilisi
15	FW	Aleko Mzevashvili	10 March 1995 (aged 17)	—	(Georgia (country)) Lokomotivi Tbilisi
16	DF	Giorgi Gabadze	2 March 1995 (aged 17)	—	(Georgia (country)) Lokomotivi Tbilisi
17	MF	Archil Meshki	2 November 1995 (aged 16)	—	(Georgia (country)) Dinamo Tbilisi
18	DF	Giorgi Gorozia	26 March 1995 (aged 17)	—	(Georgia (country)) Lokomotivi Tbilisi

=== Germany ===
Head coach: (Germany) Stefan Böger

No.	Pos.	Player	Date of birth (age)	Caps	Club
1	GK	Oliver Schnitzler	13 October 1995 (aged 16)	11	(Germany) Bayer Leverkusen
2	DF	Pascal Itter	3 April 1995 (aged 17)	14	(Germany) 1. FC Nürnberg
3	DF	**Jeremy Dudziak**	28 August 1995 (aged 16)	13	(Germany) Borussia Dortmund
4	DF	Marian Sarr	30 January 1995 (aged 17)	12	(Germany) Bayer Leverkusen
5	DF	**Niklas Süle**	3 September 1995 (aged 16)	13	(Germany) 1899 Hoffenheim
6	MF	Nico Brandenburger	17 January 1995 (aged 17)	9	(Germany) Borussia Mönchengladbach
7	FW	**Julian Brandt**	2 May 1996 (aged 16)	4	(Germany) VfL Wolfsburg
8	MF	**Leon Goretzka** (c)	6 February 1995 (aged 17)	13	(Germany) VfL Bochum
9	FW	Said Benkarit	12 January 1995 (aged 17)	13	(Germany) Borussia Dortmund
10	MF	**Max Meyer**	18 September 1995 (aged 16)	13	(Germany) Schalke 04
11	MF	Maximilian Dittgen	3 March 1995 (aged 17)	12	(Germany) Schalke 04
12	GK	Marvin Schwäbe	25 April 1995 (aged 17)	6	(Germany) Eintracht Frankfurt
14	DF	Marc-Oliver Kempf	28 January 1995 (aged 17)	9	(Germany) Eintracht Frankfurt
15	DF	**Kevin Akpoguma**	19 April 1995 (aged 17)	12	(Germany) Karlsruher SC
16	MF	**Niklas Stark**	14 April 1995 (aged 17)	2	(Germany) 1. FC Nürnberg
19	FW	**Timo Werner**	6 March 1996 (aged 16)	1	(Germany) VfB Stuttgart
20	MF	Marc Stendera	10 December 1995 (aged 16)	1	(Germany) Eintracht Frankfurt
22	FW	Felix Lohkemper	26 January 1995 (aged 17)	7	(Germany) VfB Stuttgart

== Group B ==
=== Slovenia ===
Head coach: (Slovenia) Miloš Kostič

No.	Pos.	Player	Date of birth (age)	Caps	Club
1	GK	Gregor Zabret	18 August 1995 (aged 16)	—	(Slovenia) Domžale
2	DF	Dino Paljušic	21 April 1995 (aged 17)	—	(Croatia) NK Zagreb
3	DF	Simon Hvastija	23 July 1995 (aged 16)	—	(Slovenia) Interblock
4	MF	Daniel Vujčić	12 April 1995 (aged 17)	—	(Slovenia) Maribor
5	DF	Emir Dautović	5 February 1995 (aged 17)	—	(Slovenia) Maribor
6	DF	Damjan Vuklišević	28 June 1995 (aged 16)	—	(Slovenia) Maribor
7	FW	Roy Rudonja	26 January 1995 (aged 17)	—	(England) Sheffield Wednesday
8	MF	**Dino Hotić**	26 July 1995 (aged 16)	—	(Slovenia) Maribor
9	FW	Bian Paul Šauperl	15 April 1995 (aged 17)	—	(Slovenia) Maribor
10	MF	Sven Dodlek	28 September 1995 (aged 16)	—	(Slovenia) Maribor
11	FW	Maks Barišič	6 March 1995 (aged 17)	—	(Slovenia) Koper
12	GK	Zoki Cvetkovič	2 August 1995 (aged 16)	—	(Slovenia) Koper
13	FW	**Luka Zahović**	15 November 1995 (aged 16)	—	(Slovenia) Maribor
14	DF	Tilen Klemenčič	21 August 1995 (aged 16)	—	(Slovenia) Triglav Kranj
15	MF	**Domen Črnigoj**	18 November 1995 (aged 16)	—	(Slovenia) Koper
16	MF	Bine Kavčič	14 January 1995 (aged 17)	—	(Slovenia) Gorica
17	MF	Domen Rupnik	5 April 1995 (aged 17)	—	(Slovenia) Interblock
18	MF	**Petar Stojanović**	7 October 1995 (aged 16)	—	(Slovenia) Maribor

=== Netherlands ===
Head coach: (Netherlands) Albert Stuivenberg

No.	Pos.	Player	Date of birth (age)	Caps	Club
1	GK	Nick Olij	1 August 1995 (aged 16)	—	(Netherlands) AZ
2	DF	Djavan Anderson	21 April 1995 (aged 17)	—	(Netherlands) Ajax
3	DF	**Riechedly Bazoer**	12 October 1996 (aged 15)	—	(Netherlands) PSV
4	DF	**Jorrit Hendrix**	6 February 1995 (aged 17)	—	(Netherlands) PSV
5	DF	Joris Voest	8 January 1995 (aged 17)	—	(Netherlands) Heerenveen
6	DF	**Thom Haye**	9 February 1995 (aged 17)	—	(Netherlands) AZ
7	FW	Elton Acolatse	25 July 1995 (aged 16)	—	(Netherlands) Ajax
8	DF	**Nathan Aké** (c)	18 February 1995 (aged 17)	—	(England) Chelsea
9	MF	Rai Vloet	8 May 1995 (aged 16)	—	(Netherlands) PSV
10	MF	**Tonny Vilhena**	3 January 1995 (aged 17)	—	(Netherlands) Feyenoord
11	FW	Jeroen Lumu	27 May 1995 (aged 16)	—	(Netherlands) Willem II
12	DF	Bram van Vlerken	7 October 1995 (aged 16)	—	(Netherlands) PSV
13	DF	**Sandy Walsh**	14 March 1995 (aged 17)	—	(Belgium) Genk
14	MF	Branco van den Boomen	21 July 1995 (aged 16)	—	(Netherlands) Ajax
15	MF	Pascal Huser	17 April 1995 (aged 17)	—	(Netherlands) Heerenveen
16	GK	Mike Havekotte	12 September 1995 (aged 16)	—	(Netherlands) Utrecht
17	FW	Wouter Marinus	18 February 1995 (aged 17)	—	(Netherlands) Heerenveen
18	FW	Queensy Menig	19 August 1995 (aged 16)	—	(Netherlands) Ajax

=== Poland ===
Head coach: (Poland) Marcin Dorna

No.	Pos.	Player	Date of birth (age)	Caps	Club
1	GK	Oskar Pogorzelec	9 May 1995 (aged 16)		(Poland) Legia Warsaw
2	DF	Patryk Stępiński	16 January 1995 (aged 17)		(Poland) Widzew Łódź
3	MF	Konrad Budek	8 November 1995 (aged 16)		(Poland) Polonia Warsaw
4	DF	Gracjan Horoszkiewicz	18 March 1995 (aged 17)		(Germany) Hertha BSC
5	DF	Igor Łasicki	26 June 1995 (aged 16)		(Poland) Zagłębie Lubin
6	MF	**Karol Linetty**	2 February 1995 (aged 17)		(Poland) Lech Poznań
7	DF	Piotr Azikiewicz	21 April 1995 (aged 17)		(Poland) Zagłębie Lubin
8	DF	Sebastian Rudol	21 February 1995 (aged 17)		(Poland) Pogoń Szczecin
9	FW	**Mariusz Stępiński**	12 May 1995 (aged 16)		(Poland) Widzew Łódź
10	MF	Adrian Cierpka	6 January 1995 (aged 17)		(Poland) Lech Poznań
11	MF	Vincent Rabiega	14 June 1995 (aged 16)		(Germany) Hertha BSC
12	GK	Aleksander Wandzel	12 January 1995 (aged 17)		(Poland) Lech Poznań
13	MF	Łukasz Żegleń	9 June 1995 (aged 16)		(Poland) Gwarek Zabrze
14	DF	Sebastian Zieleniecki	16 February 1995 (aged 17)		(Poland) UKS SMS Łódź
15	FW	Dariusz Formella	21 October 1995 (aged 16)		(Poland) Arka Gdynia
16	FW	Damian Kugiel	30 May 1995 (aged 16)		(Poland) Lechia Gdańsk
17	MF	Rafał Włodarczyk	26 January 1995 (aged 17)		(Poland) Mazur Karczew
18	MF	Karol Żwir	12 June 1995 (aged 16)		(Poland) Stomil Olsztyn

=== Belgium ===
Head coach: (Belgium) Patrick Klinkenberg

No.	Pos.	Player	Date of birth (age)	Caps	Club
1	GK	Lucas Pirard	10 March 1995 (aged 17)		(Belgium) Standard Liège
2	DF	Sébastien Locigno	2 September 1995 (aged 16)		(Belgium) Standard Liège
3	DF	Benjamin Van Den Ackerveken	29 June 1995 (aged 16)		(Belgium) Standard Liège
4	DF	Corentin Fiore	24 March 1995 (aged 17)		(Belgium) Standard Liège
5	DF	Ali Yasar	8 March 1995 (aged 17)		(Belgium) Standard Liège
6	MF	**Leander Dendoncker**	15 April 1995 (aged 17)		(Belgium) R.S.C. Anderlecht
7	FW	Erivelton	17 November 1995 (aged 16)		(Belgium) Genk
8	MF	Pieter Gerkens	17 February 1995 (aged 17)		(Belgium) Genk
9	FW	Siebe Schrijvers	18 July 1996 (aged 15)		(Belgium) Genk
10	MF	**Deni Milošević**	9 March 1995 (aged 17)		(Belgium) Standard Liège
11	FW	Tuur Dierckx	9 May 1995 (aged 16)		(Belgium) Club Brugge
12	GK	Álex Craninx	21 October 1995 (aged 16)		(Spain) Real Madrid
13	DF	Anthony Rivituso	6 January 1995 (aged 17)		(Belgium) Anderlecht
14	DF	Frederik Spruyt	23 May 1995 (aged 16)		(Belgium) Genk
15	MF	François Marquet	17 April 1995 (aged 17)		(Belgium) Standard Liège
16	FW	Pierre Biscotti	6 January 1995 (aged 17)		(Belgium) Sint-Truidense
17	MF	Muhammed Mert	9 February 1995 (aged 17)		(Belgium) Genk
18	MF	Joren Dehond	8 August 1995 (aged 16)		(Belgium) Oud-Heverlee Leuven
