= Sarr =

Sarr is a Senegalese, Mauritanian and Gambian surname common among the Serer people of West Africa, and their descendants.

Notable people named Sarr include:

== Sport ==
=== Association football ===
- Abdoulaye Sarr (born 1951), Senegalese football coach, played for Stade de Mbour, briefly coach of Senegal
- Adama Sarr (born 1991), Senegalese footballer, mostly played for French clubs
- Babacar Sarr (born 1991), Senegalese footballer, mostly played for Norwegian clubs, accused of rape
- Badara Sarr (born 1994), Senegalese footballer, played for Italian clubs
- Boubacar Sarr (born 1951), Senegalese footballer, mostly played for French clubs, including Marseille and PSG
- Bouna Sarr (born 1992), French footballer, has mostly played for Marseille and Metz, and for Senegal
- Cheikh Tidiane Sarr (born 1987), Danish footballer
- Chérif Ousmane Sarr (born 1986), Senegalese footballer
- Fallou Sarr (born 1997), Senegalese footballer
- Ismaïla Sarr (born 1998), Senegalese footballer, plays for Crystal Palace and Senegal
- Issa Sarr (born 1986), Senegalese footballer
- Malang Sarr (born 1999), French footballer
- Mamadou Sarr (born 2005), Senegalese footballer
- Marian Sarr (born 1995), German footballer
- Mass Sarr, Jr. (born 1973), Liberian footballer
- Mohamed Sarr (born 1983), Senegalese footballer
- Momodou Sarr (born 2000), Finnish footballer
- Mouhamadou-Naby Sarr (born 1993), French footballer
- Naby Sarr (born 1993), French footballer
- Ouleymata Sarr (born 1995), French footballer
- Pape Sarr (born 1977), Senegalese footballer
- Pape Macou Sarr (born 1991), Senegalese footballer
- Pape Matar Sarr (born 2002), Senegalese footballer
- Sally Sarr (born 1986), French footballer
- Sangoné Sarr (born 1992), Senegalese footballer
- Sidy Sarr (born 1996), Senegalese footballer
- Wilfried Sarr (born 1996), German footballer

=== Other sports ===
- Alex Sarr (born 2005), French basketball player
- Ambroise Sarr (1950–2024), Senegalese boxer and wrestler
- Mamadou Sarr (1938–2022), Senegalese sprinter
- Olivier Sarr (born 1999), French basketball player

== Other fields ==
- Alioune Sarr (1908–2001), Senegalese historian and politician
- Amy Sarr Fall
- Ibrahima Sarr (born 1949), Mauritanian journalist and politician
- Julia Sarr (born 1970), Senegalese singer
- Mariama Sarr (born 1963), Senegalese politician
- Mohamed Mbougar Sarr (born 1990), Senegalese writer
- Théodore-Adrien Sarr (born 1936), Senegalese cardinal

== See also ==
- Saar
