= 2012 UEFA European Under-17 Championship =

UEFA evropsko prvenstvo v nogometu do 17 let 2012

Tournament details
- Host country: Slovenia
- Dates: 4–16 May
- Teams: 8 (from 1 confederation)
- Venues: 4 (in 4 host cities)

Final positions
- Champions: Netherlands (2nd title)
- Runners-up: Germany

Tournament statistics
- Matches played: 15
- Goals scored: 28 (1.87 per match)
- Attendance: 41,424 (2,762 per match)
- Top scorer: (Germany) Max Meyer (3 goals)
- Best player: (Germany) Max Meyer

The 2012 UEFA European Under-17 Championship was the eleventh edition of UEFA's European Under-17 Football Championship under its current age grouping. Slovenia hosted the tournament between 4 and 16 May. An appeal by the Hungarian Football Federation to have Hungary replace Belgium over an ineligible player in the Belgium V Russia elite round match was unsuccessful.

Players born after 1 January 1995 were eligible to participate in this competition.

== Venues ==
The tournament was held in Domžale, Lendava, Ljubljana and Maribor. The selected stadiums that hosted the matches were:

Ljubljana	Maribor	2012 UEFA European Under-17 Championship is located in Slovenia	Domžale	Lendava
Stožice Stadium	Ljudski vrt	2012 UEFA European Under-17 Championship is located in Slovenia	Domžale Sports Park	Lendava Sports Park
Capacity: 16,038	Capacity: 12,702	2012 UEFA European Under-17 Championship is located in Slovenia	Capacity: 2,854	Capacity: 2,011

== Qualification ==
The final tournament of the 2012 UEFA European Under-17 Championship was preceded by two qualification stages: a qualifying round and an Elite round. During these rounds, 52 national teams competed to determine the seven teams.

== Participants ==
- Belgium
- France
- Georgia
- Germany
- Iceland
- Netherlands
- Poland
- Slovenia^{1}(hosts)

1. Teams that made their debut (as an Under 17 side).

== Match officials ==
A total of 6 referees, 8 assistant referees and 2 fourth officials were appointed for the final tournament.

Referees

- (Bosnia and Herzegovina) Emir Alečković
- (Romania) Marius Avram
- (Finland) Mattias Gestranius
- (Slovakia) Ivan Kružliak
- (Austria) Harald Lechner
- (Malta) Alan Mario Sant

Assistant referees

- (Montenegro) Milutin Djukič
- (Republic of Ireland) Mark Gavin
- (Turkey) Serkan Gençerler
- (Latvia) Haralds Gudermanis
- (Azerbaijan) Mubariz Hashimov
- (Croatia) Borut Križarić
- (Norway) Leif Opland
- (Switzerland) Jean-Yves Wicht

Fourth officials

- (Slovenia) Mitja Žganec
- (Slovenia) Dejan Balažič

== Group stage ==
All times are local (UTC+02:00).

=== Group A ===
Team	Pld	W	D	L	GF	GA	GD	Pts
Germany	3	3	0	0	5	0	+5	9
Georgia	3	1	1	1	2	2	0	4
France	3	0	2	1	3	6	−3	2
Iceland	3	0	1	2	2	4	−2	1

4 May 2012
18:30

Georgia	0–1	Germany
	Report	Meyer 59'

Stožice Stadium, Ljubljana
Attendance: 600
Referee: Ivan Kružliak (Slovakia)
4 May 2012
20:30

France	2–2	Iceland
Chemlal 7'; Martial 56'	Report	Birgisson 66'; Hermannsson 77'

Sports Park, Domžale
Attendance: 1,028
Referee: Alan Mario Sant (Malta)

7 May 2012
17:30

France	1–1	Georgia
Lemar 67'	Report	Chechelasvili 30' (pen.)

Sports Park, Domžale
Attendance: 1,228
Referee: Harald Lechner (Austria)
7 May 2012
18:30

Iceland	0–1	Germany
	Report	Stendera 20'

Stožice Stadium, Ljubljana
Attendance: 1,154
Referee: Marius Avram (Romania)

10 May 2012
19:30

Germany	3–0	France
Meyer 54', 56'; Dittgen 62'	Report

Stožice Stadium, Ljubljana
Attendance: 4,552
Referee: Marius Avram (Romania)
10 May 2012
19:30

Iceland	0–1	Georgia
	Report	Dartsimelia 74'

Sports Park, Domžale
Attendance: 763
Referee: Mattias Gestranius (Finland)

=== Group B ===
Team	Pld	W	D	L	GF	GA	GD	Pts
Netherlands	3	1	2	0	3	1	+2	5
Poland	3	1	2	0	2	1	+1	5
Belgium	3	1	1	1	3	2	+1	4
Slovenia	3	0	1	2	3	7	−4	1

4 May 2012
14:00

Poland	1–0	Belgium
M. Stępiński 65'	Report

Lendava Sports Park, Lendava
Attendance: 693
Referee: Mattias Gestranius (Finland)
4 May 2012
20:15

Slovenia	1–3	Netherlands
Zahović 74'	Report	Vloet 13'; Lumu 35'; Aké 61'

Ljudski vrt, Maribor
Attendance: 8,132
Referee: Marius Avram (Romania)

7 May 2012
17:00

Netherlands	0–0	Belgium
	Report

Ljudski vrt, Maribor
Attendance: 812
Referee: Ivan Kružliak (Slovakia)
7 May 2012
20:15

Slovenia	1–1	Poland
Šauperl 26'	Report	Rabiega 10'

Lendava Sports Park, Lendava
Attendance: 1,864
Referee: Alan Mario Sant (Malta)

10 May 2012
17:30

Netherlands	0–0	Poland
	Report

Lendava Sports Park, Lendava
Attendance: 537
Referee: Emir Alecković (Bosnia and Herzegovina)
10 May 2012
17:30

Belgium	3–1	Slovenia
Schrijvers 2'; Gerkens 53'; Dierckx 80'	Report	Stojanović 13'

Ljudski vrt, Maribor
Attendance: 6,211
Referee: Harald Lechner (Austria)

== Knockout stage ==
=== Bracket ===
Semi-finals
13 May – Ljubljana
Germany	1
Poland	0
13 May – Ljubljana
Netherlands	2
Georgia	0

Final
16 May – Ljubljana
Germany	1 (4)
Netherlands	1 (5)

All times are local (UTC+2)

=== Semifinals ===
13 May 2012
17:30

Germany	1–0	Poland
Goretzka 34'	Report

Stožice Stadium, Ljubljana
Attendance: 1,629
Referee: Emir Alecković (Bosnia and Herzegovina)

13 May 2012
20:30

Netherlands	2–0	Georgia
Hendrix 79'; Haye 90+2'	Report

Stožice Stadium, Ljubljana
Attendance: 547
Referee: Marius Avram (Romania)

=== Final ===
16 May 2012
18:00

Germany	1–1	Netherlands
Goretzka 45'	Report	Acolatse 90+1'
Penalties
Sarr (penalty scored); Werner (penalty scored); Itter (penalty scored); Stendera (penalty missed); Kempf (penalty scored)	4–5	(penalty scored) Huser; (penalty scored) Aké; (penalty scored) Acolatse; (penalty scored) Hendrix; (penalty scored) Vilhena

Stožice Stadium, Ljubljana
Attendance: 11,674
Referee: Ivan Kružliak (Slovakia)

== Goalscorers ==
3 goals

- (Germany) Max Meyer

2 goals

- (Germany) Leon Goretzka

1 goals

- (Belgium) Tuur Dierckx
- (Belgium) Pieter Gerkens
- (Belgium) Siebe Schrijvers
- (France) Mohamed Chemlal
- (France) Thomas Lemar
- (France) Anthony Martial
- (Georgia (country)) Chiaber Chechelasvili
- (Georgia (country)) Dato Dartsimelia
- (Germany) Max Dittgen
- (Germany) Marc Stendera
- (Iceland) Gunnlaugur Birgisson
- (Iceland) Hjörtur Hermannsson
- (Netherlands) Elton Acolatse
- (Netherlands) Nathan Aké
- (Netherlands) Thom Haye
- (Netherlands) Jorrit Hendrix
- (Netherlands) Jeroen Lumu
- (Netherlands) Rai Vloet
- (Poland) Vincent Rabiega
- (Poland) Mariusz Stępiński
- (Slovenia) Bian Paul Šauperl
- (Slovenia) Petar Stojanović
- (Slovenia) Luka Zahović

== Tournament select squad ==
Goalkeepers

- (Germany) Oliver Schnitzler
- (Netherlands) Nick Olij

Defenders

- (Belgium) Corentin Fiore
- (Georgia (country)) Otar Kakabadze
- (Germany) Marian Sarr
- (Germany) Jeremy Dudziak
- (Iceland) Hjörtur Hermannsson
- (Netherlands) Jorrit Hendrix

Midfielders

- (Belgium) Pieter Gerkens
- (Georgia (country)) Giorgi Gorozia
- (Germany) Leon Goretzka
- (Iceland) Oliver Sigurjónsson
- (Slovenia) Dino Hotić
- (Netherlands) Nathan Aké
- (Netherlands) Thom Haye
- (Netherlands) Tonny Vilhena

Forwards

- (Belgium) Tuur Dierckx
- (France) Corentin Jean
- (Germany) Julian Brandt
- (Germany) Max Meyer
- (Germany) Marc Stendera
- (Poland) Mariusz Stępiński

Source: UEFA Technical Report
