= Kacou =

Kacou is a surname. Notable people with the surname include:

- Axel Kacou (born 1995), French footballer
- Raymonde Kacou (born 1987), Ivorian footballer
