= Stanley Bish =

Dutch former professional footballer

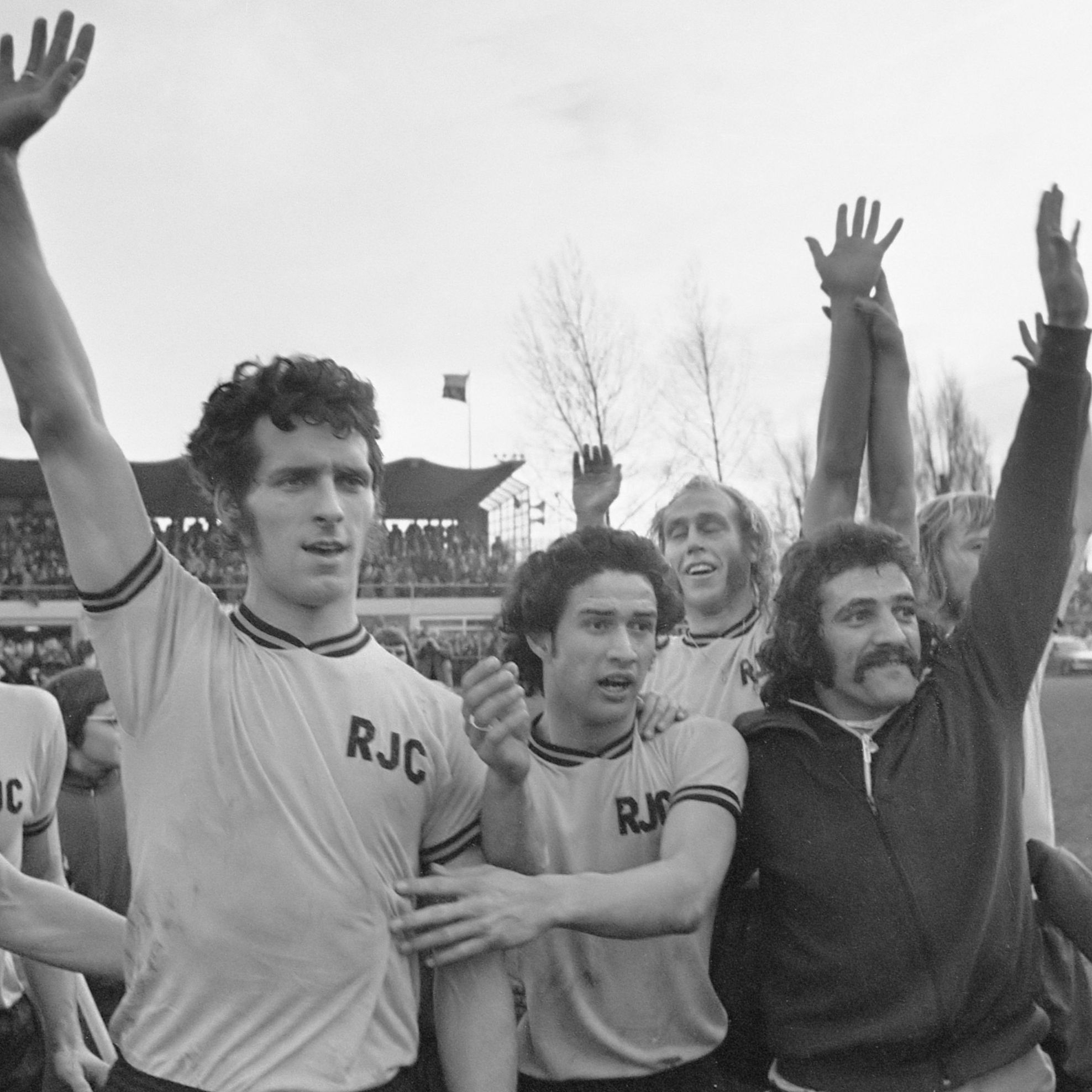
- Bish (centre) with Roda JC in 1975

Personal information
- Date of birth: 21 May 1951 (age 75)
- Place of birth: Jakarta, Indonesia
- Position: Forward

Youth career
- Megacles
- Wilhelmina '08

Senior career*
Years	Team	Apps	(Gls)
1967–1969	PSV	8	(0)
1969–1970	DWS	16	(2)
1970–1973	NAC	74	(21)
1973–1975	Roda JC	64	(24)
1975–1976	Berchem Sport	19	(4)
1976–1978	Wageningen	71	(23)
1978–1981	FC VVV	62	(19)
Total		314	(93)

International career
1969	Netherlands U-19	2	(0)
1971	Netherlands U-21	1	(0)
- * Club domestic league appearances and goals

Stanley Bish (born 21 May 1951) is a Dutch retired footballer.

Bish started his career with PSV in 1967 where he became the club's youngest ever debutant. During the course of his career he had spells across the Eredivisie and won the 1973 KNVB Beker with NAC Breda in 1973. He later had a short stint in Belgium with Berchem Sport before returning to the Netherlands where he retired in 1981.

== Club career ==
Bish played at amateur level with Megacles and Wilhelmina '08 where he was spotted by PSV. He was handed his debut for the club at the age of 16 years and 102 days, thereby becoming PSV's youngest ever player. Upon making his debut, Bish also became the Eredivisie's second youngest-ever player, after Wim Kras of Volendam. He has since been surpassed by Mark van Bommel who made his debut for Fortuna Sittard in 1992 aged 16 years and 23 days.

Bish made seven appearances for PSV between 1967 and 1969 when he was signed by DWS. He stayed only one season at the club, scoring 2 goals in 13 league appearances before joining NAC Breda in 1970. Bish's only title came during his stint in Breda where he scored the opening goal in a 2–0 win over N.E.C. to lift the 1972–73 KNVB Cup. He amassed 73 appearances for NAC between 1970 and 1973, scoring 23 goals before departing for newly promoted Eredivisie side Roda JC.

Bish stated that he had joined Roda as a result of NAC failing to meet his contract demands. He scored his first goal for the club in a 2–1 loss to MVV Maastricht on 12 August 1973. The goal was historic in that it was Roda's first ever goal in the Eredivisie. He became an immensely popular figure at the club and netted 24 goals in 64 appearances between 1973 and 1975. Bish then took the opportunity to double his wages with Berchem Sport in Belgium. He later revealed that it had been a mistake to leave Roda. He had seen the move to Belgium as an opportunity to eventually play for Anderlecht or Club Brugge but managed only six goals across all competitions for Berchem. After one season he sought to return to Roda and even underwent a medical but the deal never went through.

Instead he joined FC Wageningen where he spent two seasons, scoring 21 goals in 67 appearances. During his time with Wageningen, Bish was part of an historic win over PSV where he scored in a 6–1 cup win over his former side. He left the club in 1978 where he spent the final years of his career at FC VVV, scoring 19 goals in 62 appearances before retiring in 1981 at the age of 30.

== International career ==
Bish played twice for the Netherlands national under-19 football team in 1969 and once for the U-21's.
