= 2013–14 Borussia Dortmund season =

105th season in existence of Borussia Dortmund

Borussia Dortmund
2013–14 season
- President: Reinhard Rauball
- Head coach: Jürgen Klopp
- Stadium: Westfalenstadion
- Bundesliga: 2nd
- DFB-Pokal: Runners-up
- DFL-Supercup: Winners
- UEFA Champions League: Quarter-finals
- Top goalscorer: League: Robert Lewandowski (20); All: Robert Lewandowski (28)
Home colours	Away colours	Third colours

The 2013–14 Borussia Dortmund season was the 105th season in the club's football history. In 2013–14, the club played in the Bundesliga, the top tier of German football. It was the club's 38th consecutive season in this league, having been promoted from the 2. Bundesliga in 1976.

== Players ==
=== First team squad ===
Note: Flags indicate national team as defined under FIFA eligibility rules; some limited exceptions apply. Players may hold more than one non-FIFA nationality.

No.	Pos.	Nation	Player
1	GK	GER	Roman Weidenfeller (vice-captain)
2	DF	GER	Manuel Friedrich
4	DF	SRB	Neven Subotić
5	MF	GER	Sebastian Kehl
6	MF	GER	Sven Bender
7	MF	GER	Jonas Hofmann
8	MF	GER	İlkay Gündoğan
9	FW	POL	Robert Lewandowski
10	MF	ARM	Henrikh Mkhitaryan
11	FW	GER	Marco Reus (vice-captain)
14	MF	SRB	Miloš Jojić
15	DF	GER	Mats Hummels (captain)
16	MF	POL	Jakub Błaszczykowski
17	FW	GAB	Pierre-Emerick Aubameyang

No.	Pos.	Nation	Player
18	MF	TUR	Nuri Şahin
19	MF	GER	Kevin Großkreutz
20	GK	AUS	Mitchell Langerak
21	MF	GER	Oliver Kirch
23	FW	GER	Julian Schieber
24	DF	GER	Marian Sarr
25	DF	GRE	Sokratis Papastathopoulos
26	DF	POL	Łukasz Piszczek
28	DF	GER	Matthias Ginter
29	DF	GER	Marcel Schmelzer
34	FW	GER	Hendrik Bonmann
37	DF	GER	Erik Durm

== Competitions ==
=== Overall ===
Competition	Started round	Current position / round	Final position / round	First match	Last match
Bundesliga	Matchday 1	—	2nd	10 August 2013	10 May 2014
DFB-Pokal	Round 1	—	Runner-up	3 August 2013	17 May 2014
DFL-Supercup	Final	—	Winners	27 July 2013	
UEFA Champions League	Group stage	—	Quarter-finals	18 September 2013	8 April 2014

Updated to match played 10 May 2014
Source: Competitions

== Pre-season and friendlies ==
6 July 2013	Borussia Dortmund	9–1	Sat.1 Allstars	Dortmund
20:30	Schieber 2'; Hofmann 30'; Gensler 40' (o.g.); Gündoğan 54', 69'; Ducksch 62', 76'; Subotić 84'; Bajner 87'		Saki 7'	Stadium: Westfalenstadion

8 July 2013	1. FC Magdeburg	0–3	Borussia Dortmund	Magdeburg
18:00			Reus 44'; Bender 67'; Durm 86'	Stadium: MDCC-Arena

10 July 2013	Basel	1–3	Borussia Dortmund	Basel
18:45	Schär 17'		Reus 11'; Mkhitaryan 27'; Hofmann 90'	Stadium: St. Jakob-Park; Attendance: 18,696

13 July 2013	Bursaspor	1–4	Borussia Dortmund	Altach
20:00	Wederson 89'		Lewandowski 13'; Aubameyang 45'; Reus 62'; Aziz 69' (o.g.)	Stadium: Cashpoint-Arena

16 July 2013	Luzern	1–4	Borussia Dortmund	Luzern
18:30	Lezcano 38'		Ducksch 9'; Lewandowski 28'; Mkhitaryan 42'; Reus 55'	Stadium: Swissporarena; Attendance: 17,000

20 July 2013	Borussia Mönchengladbach	1–0	Borussia Dortmund	Mönchengladbach
16:45	Daems 60' (pen.)	Report		Stadium: Borussia-Park; Attendance: 47,125

21 July 2013	Borussia Dortmund	1–0	Hamburger SV	Mönchengladbach
16:45	Hofmann 24'	Report		Stadium: Borussia-Park

30 July 2013	Würzburger Kickers	0–3	Borussia Dortmund	Würzburg
18:30			Aubameyang 29'; Ducksch 66', 79'	Stadium: Stadion am Dallenberg

== Competitions ==
=== Bundesliga ===
==== League table ====
Pos	Team	Pld	W	D	L	GF	GA	GD	Pts	Qualification or relegation
1	Bayern Munich (C)	34	29	3	2	94	23	+71	90	Qualification for the Champions League group stage
2	Borussia Dortmund	34	22	5	7	80	38	+42	71	Qualification for the Champions League group stage
3	Schalke 04	34	19	7	8	63	43	+20	64	Qualification for the Champions League group stage
4	Bayer Leverkusen	34	19	4	11	60	41	+19	61	Qualification for the Champions League play-off round
5	VfL Wolfsburg	34	18	6	10	63	50	+13	60	Qualification for the Europa League group stage (Note: The 2013–14 DFB-Pokal finalists (Borussia Dortmund and Bayern Munich) qualified for the UEFA Champions League, thus the three Europa League places were distributed through league positions.)

Source: DFB
Rules for classification: 1) points; 2) goal difference; 3) number of goals scored.
(C) Champions

==== Results summary ====
Overall								Home						Away					
Pld	W	D	L	GF	GA	GD	Pts	W	D	L	GF	GA	GD	W	D	L	GF	GA	GD
34	22	5	7	80	38	+42	71	11	2	4	41	19	+22	11	3	3	39	19	+20

Last updated: 10 May 2014.
Source: Competitive matches

==== Results by round ====
Round	1	2	3	4	5	6	7	8	9	10	11	12	13	14	15	16	17	18	19	20	21	22	23	24	25	26	27	28	29	30	31	32	33	34
Ground	A	H	H	A	H	A	H	A	H	A	H	A	H	A	H	A	H	H	A	A	H	A	H	A	H	A	H	A	H	A	H	A	H	A
Result	W	W	W	W	W	D	W	L	W	W	W	L	L	W	L	D	L	D	W	W	W	L	W	W	L	W	D	W	W	W	W	D	W	W
Position	2	1	1	1	1	1	1	2	2	2	2	2	3	3	3	3	4	3	3	3	3	3	2	2	2	2	2	2	2	2	2	2	2	2

Updated to match(es) played on 10 May 2014. Source: Competitive matches
A = Away; H = Home; W = Win; D = Draw; L = Loss

==== Matches ====
10 August 2013 1	FC Augsburg	0–4	Borussia Dortmund	Augsburg
15:30	Ostrzolek (yellow card) 52'; Morávek (yellow card) 83'		Aubameyang 24', 66', 79'; Lewandowski 86' (pen.)	Stadium: SGL arena Attendance: 30,660; Referee: Knut Kircher (Rottenburg)

18 August 2013 2	Borussia Dortmund	2–1	Eintracht Braunschweig	Dortmund
17:30	Hofmann 75'; Reus 86' (pen.)		Theuerkauf (yellow card) 60'; Kratz 89'	Stadium: Westfalenstadion; Attendance: 80,200; Referee: Peter Sippel (Munich)

23 August 2013 3	Borussia Dortmund	1–0	Werder Bremen	Dortmund
20:30	Lewandowski 55'			Stadium: Westfalenstadion; Attendance: 80,645; Referee: Felix Zwayer (Berlin)

1 September 2013 4	Eintracht Frankfurt	1–2	Borussia Dortmund	Frankfurt
17:30	Kadlec 37'; Zambrano (yellow card) 83'		Mkhitaryan 11', 57'; Hummels (yellow card) 45+1'; Reus (yellow card) 80'	Stadium: Commerzbank-Arena; Attendance: 51,500; Referee: Manuel Gräfe (Berlin)

14 September 2013 5	Borussia Dortmund	6–2	Hamburger SV	Dortmund
18:30	Aubameyang 19', 65'; Mkhitaryan 22'; Lewandowski 73', 81'; Reus 74'		Lam 26'; Rincón (yellow card) 28'; Van der Vaart (yellow card) 44'; Westermann 49'; Diekmeier (yellow card) 51'; Arslan (yellow card) 71'	Stadium: Westfalenstadion; Attendance: 80,645; Referee: Tobias Welz (Wiesbaden)

21 September 2013 6	1. FC Nürnberg	1–1	Borussia Dortmund	Nuremberg
15:30	Chandler (yellow card) 21'; Nilsson 51'		Reus (yellow card) 34'; Schmelzer 37'; Subotić (yellow card) 65'	Stadium: Frankenstadion; Attendance: 50,000; Referee: Knut Kircher (Rottenburg)

28 September 2013 7	Borussia Dortmund	5–0	SC Freiburg	Dortmund
15:30	Reus 35', 45+2' (pen.); Lewandowski 58', 70'; Błaszczykowski 79'		Diagne (red card) 45+1'; Sorg (yellow card) 89'	Stadium: Westfalenstadion; Attendance: 80,645; Referee: Markus Schmidt (Stuttgart)

5 October 2013 8	Borussia Mönchengladbach	2–0	Borussia Dortmund	Mönchengladbach
15:30	Kruse 81' (pen.); Stranzl (yellow card) 85'; Raffael 86'; Kramer (yellow card) 90+3'		Großkreutz (yellow card) 36'; Hummels (red card) 80'; Lewandowski (yellow card) 90'	Stadium: Borussia-Park; Attendance: 54,010; Referee: Manuel Gräfe (Berlin)

19 October 2013 9	Borussia Dortmund	1–0	Hannover 96	Dortmund
15:30	Reus 4' (pen.); Weidenfeller (yellow card) 90+4'		Sakai (yellow card) 3'; Sobiech (yellow card) 7'; Sané (yellow card) 32'	Stadium: Westfalenstadion; Attendance: 80,645; Referee: Peter Gagelmann (Bremen)

26 October 2013 10	Schalke 04	1–3	Borussia Dortmund	Gelsenkirchen
15:30	Aogo (yellow card) 35'; Szalai (yellow card) 59'; Meyer 63'; Jones (yellow card) 90'		Aubameyang 14'; Schmelzer (yellow card) 43'; Şahin 51'; Błaszczykowski 74'	Stadium: Veltins-Arena; Attendance: 61,973; Referee: Knut Kircher (Hirschau)

1 November 2013 11	Borussia Dortmund	6–1	VfB Stuttgart	Dortmund
20:30	Papastathopoulos 19', (yellow card) 53'; Reus 22'; Lewandowski 54', 56', 72'; Aubameyang 81'		Haggui 13'	Stadium: Westfalenstadion; Attendance: 80,645; Referee: Florian Meyer (Burgdorf)

9 November 2013 12	VfL Wolfsburg	2–1	Borussia Dortmund	Wolfsburg
15:30	Caligiuri (yellow card) 9'; Ochs (yellow card) 45+1'; Rodríguez 56'; Olić 69'		Bender (yellow card) 12'; Hummels (yellow card) 24'; Reus 45+2', (yellow card) 84'; Mkhitaryan (yellow card) 81'	Stadium: Volkswagen Arena; Attendance: 30,000; Referee: Jochen Drees (Münster-Sarmsheim)

23 November 2013 13	Borussia Dortmund	0–3	Bayern Munich	Dortmund
18:30	Großkreutz (yellow card) 45'; Mkhitaryan (yellow card) 56'		Boateng (yellow card) 36'; Rafinha (yellow card) 44'; Mandžukić (yellow card) 45'; Götze 66'; Robben 85'; Müller 87'	Stadium: Westfalenstadion; Attendance: 80,645; Referee: Manuel Gräfe (Berlin)

30 November 2013 14	Mainz 05	1–3	Borussia Dortmund	Mainz
15:30	Bell (yellow card) 59'; Choupo-Moting 74' (pen.); Soto (red card) 78'		Aubameyang 70'; Lewandowski 78' (pen.), 90+4' (pen.)	Stadium: Coface Arena; Attendance: 34,000; Referee: Deniz Aytekin (Oberasbach)

7 December 2013 15	Borussia Dortmund	0–1	Bayer Leverkusen	Dortmund
18:30	Papastathopoulos (yellow card) 69' (yellow-red card) 90+2'		Son 18'; Hegeler (yellow card) 58'; Can (yellow card) 61'; Castro (yellow card) 80'; Spahić (red card) 80'; Wollscheid (yellow card) 90+3'	Stadium: Westfalenstadion; Attendance: 80,645; Referee: Florian Meyer (Burgdorf)

14 December 2013 16	1899 Hoffenheim	2–2	Borussia Dortmund	Sinsheim
15:30	Volland (yellow card) 11'; Schipplock 17'; Volland 37'; Polanski (yellow card) 79'		Reus (yellow card) 14'; Aubameyang 44'; Piszczek 67'; Friedrich (yellow card) 76'; Şahin (yellow card) 83'	Stadium: Rhein-Neckar-Arena; Attendance: 30,150; Referee: Felix Zwayer (Berlin)

21 December 2013 17	Borussia Dortmund	1–2	Hertha BSC	Dortmund
15:30	Reus 7'; Sarr (yellow card) 45+2'; Şahin (yellow card) 90+1'		Ramos 23'; Allagui 45'; Ciğerci (yellow card) 50'; Kobiashvili (yellow card) 67'; Hosogai (yellow card) 81'	Stadium: Westfalenstadion; Attendance: 80,645; Referee: Peter Gagelmann (Bremen)

25 January 2014 18	Borussia Dortmund	2–2	FC Augsburg	Dortmund
15:30	Bender 6', (yellow card) 10'; Papastathopoulos (yellow card) 45'; Şahin 66'		Hahn (yellow card) 17'; Werner (yellow card) 45'; Bender 56' (o.g.); Ji 72'	Stadium: Westfalenstadion; Attendance: 80,645; Referee: Tobias Welz (Wiesbaden)

31 January 2014 19	Eintracht Braunschweig	1–2	Borussia Dortmund	Braunschweig
20:30	Kessel 54'		Aubameyang 31', 65'; Mkhitaryan (yellow card) 38'	Stadium: Eintracht-Stadion; Attendance: 23,325; Referee: Marco Fritz (Korb)

8 February 2014 20	Werder Bremen	1–5	Borussia Dortmund	Bremen
15:30	Di Santo (yellow card) 13'; Kobylanski (yellow card) 70'; Ayçiçek 89'		Friedrich (yellow card) 25', (goal) 48'; Lewandowski 26', 85'; Mkhitaryan 41', 62'; Papastathopoulos (yellow card) 69'	Stadium: Weserstadion; Attendance: 42,100; Referee: Günter Perl (Pullach)

15 February 2014 21	Borussia Dortmund	4–0	Eintracht Frankfurt	Dortmund
15:30	Aubameyang 10', 21'; Lewandowski 47'; Jojić 68'; Şahin (yellow card) 83'		Kempf (yellow card) 70'; Russ (yellow card) 83'; Schröck (yellow card) 85'	Stadium: Westfalenstadion; Attendance: 80,645; Referee: Peter Sippel (Munich)

22 February 2014 22	Hamburger SV	3–0	Borussia Dortmund	Hamburg
15:30	Jiráček 42'; Rincón (yellow card) 46'; Lasogga 58'; Zoua (yellow card) 86'; Çalhanoğlu 90+1'		Aubameyang (yellow card) 55'; Reus (yellow card) 90'	Stadium: Imtech Arena; Attendance: 57,000; Referee: Felix Brych (Munich)

1 March 2014 23	Borussia Dortmund	3–0	1. FC Nürnberg	Dortmund
15:30	Hummels 51'; Lewandowski 64'; Mkhitaryan 83'		Feulner (yellow card) 45'; Pogatetz (yellow card) 57'	Stadium: Westfalenstadion; Attendance: 80,645; Referee: Christian Dingert (Lebecksmühle)

9 March 2014 24	SC Freiburg	0–1	Borussia Dortmund	Freiburg
15:30	Fernandes (yellow card) 24'		Mkhitaryan (yellow card) 33'; Papastathopoulos (yellow card) 43'; Kehl 58'	Stadium: Mage Solar Stadion; Attendance: 24,000; Referee: Peter Gagelmann (Bremen)

15 March 2014 25	Borussia Dortmund	1–2	Borussia Mönchengladbach	Dortmund
15:30	Lewandowski (yellow card) 60'; Jojić 77'		Raffael 31'; Kruse 40'; Nordtveit (yellow card) 68' (yellow-red card) 69'	Stadium: Westfalenstadion; Attendance: 80,645; Referee: Deniz Aytekin (Oberasbach)

22 March 2014 26	Hannover 96	0–3	Borussia Dortmund	Hannover
15:30	Sakai (yellow card) 36'		Hummels 43', (yellow card) 74'; Lewandowski 52'; Reus 90+1'	Stadium: HDI-Arena; Attendance: 49,000; Referee: Günter Perl (Pullach)

25 March 2014 27	Borussia Dortmund	0–0	Schalke 04	Dortmund
20:00	Reus (yellow card) 24'; Hummels (yellow card) 58'		Draxler (yellow card) 29'; Boateng (yellow card) 73'; Ayhan (yellow card) 74'	Stadium: Westfalenstadion; Attendance: 77,600; Referee: Florian Meyer (Burgdorf)

29 March 2014 28	VfB Stuttgart	2–3	Borussia Dortmund	Stuttgart
15:30	Gentner 9'; Harnik 19'; Niedermeier (red card) 67'		Reus 30', 68', 83'; Kirch (yellow card) 35'; Großkreutz (yellow card) 90+6'	Stadium: Mercedes-Benz Arena; Attendance: 59,500; Referee: Michael Weiner (Ottenstein) after 76 minute Norbert Grudzinski (Hamburg)

5 April 2014 29	Borussia Dortmund	2–1	VfL Wolfsburg	Dortmund
18:30	Şahin (yellow card) 37'; Lewandowski 51'; Jojić (yellow card) 55'; Reus 77'		Träsch (yellow card) 32'; Olić 34'	Stadium: Westfalenstadion; Attendance: 80,645; Referee: Knut Kircher (Rottenburg)

12 April 2014 30	Bayern Munich	0–3	Borussia Dortmund	Munich
18:30	Martínez (yellow card) 10'; Kroos (yellow card) 80'; Rafinha (red card) 90+1'		Mkhitaryan 20', (yellow card) 82'; Reus 49'; Hofmann 56', (yellow card) 59'	Stadium: Allianz Arena; Attendance: 71,000; Referee: Felix Zwayer (Berlin)

19 April 2014 31	Borussia Dortmund	4–2	Mainz 05	Dortmund
15:30	Jojić 6', (yellow card) 8'; Lewandowski 18'; Piszczek 56'; Reus 79' (pen.)		Okazaki 14', 53', (yellow card) 39'; Bungert (red card) 78'	Stadium: Westfalenstadion; Attendance: 80,500; Referee: Markus Schmidt (Stuttgart)

26 April 2014 32	Bayer Leverkusen	2–2	Borussia Dortmund	Leverkusen
18:30	Bender 7'; Castro 35'; Spahić (yellow card) 52'	Report	Kirch 29'; Reus 39' (pen.); Lewandowski (yellow card) 48'	Stadium: BayArena; Attendance: 30,201; Referee: Günter Perl (Pullach)

3 May 2014 33	Borussia Dortmund	3–2	1899 Hoffenheim	Dortmund
15:30	Großkreutz 29'; Mkhitaryan 31'; Piszczek 34'		Firmino 5'; Polanski (yellow card) 32'; Süle 66'	Stadium: Westfalenstadion; Attendance: 80,645; Referee: Tobias Welz (Wiesbaden)

10 May 2014 34	Hertha BSC	0–4	Borussia Dortmund	Berlin
15:30	Schulz (yellow card) 70'; Wagner (yellow card) 86'		Lewandowski 41', 80'; Jojić 44'; Mkhitaryan 82'	Stadium: Olympiastadion; Attendance: 76,197; Referee: Tobias Stieler (Hamburg)

=== DFB-Pokal ===
3 August 2013 Round 1	SV Wilhelmshaven	0–3	Borussia Dortmund	Wilhelmshaven
15:30	Jahdadic (yellow card) 64'; Tietz (yellow card) 67'; Siala (yellow card) 76'	Report	Großkreutz 71'; Ducksch 83'; Lewandowski 90'	Stadium: Jadestadion; Attendance: 8,000; Referee: Benjamin Brand (Gerolzhofen)

24 September 2013 Round 2	1860 Munich	0–2 (a.e.t.)	Borussia Dortmund	Munich
19:00	Volz (yellow card) 87'; Stahl (red card) 104'; Stark (yellow card) 117'	Report	Błaszczykowski (yellow card) 87'; Aubameyang 105'; Mkhitaryan 107'	Stadium: Allianz Arena; Attendance: 71,000; Referee: Michael Weiner (Hasede)

3 December 2013 Round 3	1. FC Saarbrücken	0–2	Borussia Dortmund	Saarbrücken
20:30	Korte (yellow card) 56'; Knipping (yellow card) 60'	Report	Schieber 19'; Hofmann 48'	Stadium: Ludwigsparkstadion; Attendance: 30,931; Referee: Marco Fritz (Korb)

11 February 2014 Quarter-finals	Eintracht Frankfurt	0–1	Borussia Dortmund	Frankfurt
20:45			Aubameyang 83'	Stadium: Commerzbank-Arena; Attendance: 51,500; Referee: Knut Kircher (Rottenburg)

15 April 2014 Semi-finals	Borussia Dortmund	2–0	VfL Wolfsburg	Dortmund
20:30	Mkhitaryan 12'; Lewandowski 43'; Kehl (yellow card) 66'; Aubameyang (yellow card) 90+6'	Report	Luiz Gustavo (yellow card) 7'	Stadium: Westfalenstadion; Attendance: 80,645; Referee: Manuel Gräfe (Berlin)

17 May 2014 Final	Borussia Dortmund	0–2 (a.e.t.)	Bayern Munich	Berlin
20:00		Report	Kroos (yellow card) 52'; Højbjerg (yellow card) 63'; Boateng (yellow card) 67'; Robben 107', (yellow card) 117'; Van Buyten (yellow card) 115'; Müller 120+3'	Stadium: Olympiastadion; Attendance: 76,197; Referee: Florian Meyer (Burgdorf)

Last updated: 16 April 2014
Sources: DFB.de, kicker.de

=== DFL-Supercup ===
27 July 2013 Final	Borussia Dortmund	4–2	Bayern Munich	Dortmund
20:30	Reus 6', 86'; Van Buyten 56' (o.g.); Gündoğan 57'	Report	Robben 54', 64'; Boateng (yellow card) 90+2'	Stadium: Westfalenstadion; Attendance: 80,645; Referee: Jochen Drees (Bad Kreuznach)

Last updated: 27 July 2013
Source: Bundesliga.de

=== UEFA Champions League ===
==== Group stage ====
Pos	Team	Pld	W	D	L	GF	GA	GD	Pts	Qualification	DOR	ARS	NAP	MAR
1	(Germany) Borussia Dortmund	6	4	0	2	11	6	+5	12 (Note: Tied on head-to-head points (6). Head-to-head goal difference: Borussia Dortmund +1, Arsenal 0, Napoli −1.)	Advance to knockout phase	—	0–1	3–1	3–0
2	(England) Arsenal	6	4	0	2	8	5	+3	12	Advance to knockout phase	1–2	—	2–0	2–0
3	(Italy) Napoli	6	4	0	2	10	9	+1	12	Transfer to Europa League	2–1	2–0	—	3–2
4	(France) Marseille	6	0	0	6	5	14	−9	0		1–2	1–2	1–2	—

Source: UEFA
Notes:

18 September 2013 1	Napoli (Italy)	2–1	(Germany) Borussia Dortmund	Naples, Italy
20:45 CEST (UTC+02:00)	Higuaín 29'; Behrami (yellow card) 33'; Britos (yellow card) 37'; Insigne 67', (yellow card) 68'	Report	Schmelzer (yellow card) 39'; Weidenfeller (red card) 45+1'; Zúñiga 87' (o.g.)	Stadium: Stadio San Paolo; Attendance: 58,000; Referee: Pedro Proença (Portugal)

1 October 2013 2	Borussia Dortmund (Germany)	3–0	(France) Marseille	Dortmund, Germany
20:45 CEST (UTC+02:00)	Lewandowski 19', 80' (pen.); Reus 52'; Subotić (yellow card) 62'; Bender (yellow card) 64'	Report	Romao (yellow card) 51'; Fanni (yellow card) 65'; N'Koulou (yellow card) 76'	Stadium: Westfalenstadion; Attendance: 65,829; Referee: David Fernández Borbalán (Spain)

22 October 2013 3	Arsenal (England)	1–2	(Germany) Borussia Dortmund	London, England
20:45 CEST (UTC+02:00)	Giroud 41'; Rosický (yellow card) 51'; Özil (yellow card) 85'	Report	Mkhitaryan 16'; Hummels (yellow card) 22'; Lewandowski (yellow card) 64', (goal) 82'; Bender (yellow card) 71'	Stadium: Emirates Stadium; Attendance: 60,011; Referee: Jonas Eriksson (Sweden)

6 November 2013 4	Borussia Dortmund (Germany)	0–1	(England) Arsenal	Dortmund, Germany
20:45 CET (UTC+01:00)	Lewandowski (yellow card) 41'	Report	Arteta (yellow card) 23'; Ramsey 62'	Stadium: Westfalenstadion; Attendance: 65,829; Referee: Björn Kuipers (Netherlands)

26 November 2013 5	Borussia Dortmund (Germany)	3–1	(Italy) Napoli	Dortmund, Germany
20:45 CET (UTC+01:00)	Reus 10' (pen.); Kehl (yellow card) 38'; Błaszczykowski 60'; Aubameyang 78'	Report	Fernández (yellow card) 9'; Higuaín (yellow card) 11'; Albiol (yellow card) 36'; Pandev (yellow card) 38'; Insigne 71'	Stadium: Westfalenstadion; Attendance: 65,829; Referee: Carlos Velasco Carballo (Spain)

11 December 2013 6	Marseille (France)	1–2	(Germany) Borussia Dortmund	Marseille, France
20:45 CET (UTC+01:00)	Diawara 14'; Payet (yellow card) 32' (yellow-red card) 34'; Gignac (yellow card) 71'	Report	Lewandowski 4'; Großkreutz 87'; Sarr (yellow card) 90+2'	Stadium: Stade Vélodrome; Attendance: 36,655; Referee: Marijo Strahonja (Croatia)

==== Knockout phase ====
===== Round of 16 =====
25 February 2014 First leg	Zenit Saint Petersburg (Russia)	2–4	(Germany) Borussia Dortmund	Saint Petersburg, Russia
21:00 MSK (UTC+04:00)	Anyukov (yellow card) 54'; Shatov 58'; Hulk 69' (pen.); Fayzulin (yellow card) 81'	Report	Mkhitaryan 5'; Reus 6'; Lewandowski 61', 71'; Piszczek (yellow card) 69'	Stadium: Petrovsky Stadium; Attendance: 15,099; Referee: Willie Collum (Scotland)

19 March 2014 Second leg	Borussia Dortmund (Germany)	1–2 (5–4 agg.)	(Russia) Zenit Saint Petersburg	Dortmund, Germany
20:45 CET (UTC+01:00)	Lewandowski (yellow card) 19'; Kehl 38', (yellow card) 54'; Jojić (yellow card) 75'	Report	Hulk 16'; Lombaerts (yellow card) 23'; Rondón 73'	Stadium: Westfalenstadion; Attendance: 65,829; Referee: Alberto Undiano Mallenco (Spain)

===== Quarter-finals =====
2 April 2014 First leg	Real Madrid (Spain)	3–0	(Germany) Borussia Dortmund	Madrid, Spain
20:45 CEST (UTC+02:00)	Bale 3'; Isco 27'; Ronaldo 57'	Report	Reus (yellow card) 18'; Kehl (yellow card) 30'; Großkreutz (yellow card) 87'	Stadium: Santiago Bernabéu Stadium; Attendance: 70,089; Referee: Mark Clattenburg (England)

8 April 2014 Second leg	Borussia Dortmund (Germany)	2–0 (2–3 agg.)	(Spain) Real Madrid	Dortmund, Germany
20:45 CEST (UTC+02:00)	Reus 24', 37', (yellow card) 75'; Aubameyang (yellow card) 82'	Report	Ramos (yellow card) 28'; Alonso (yellow card) 31'; Carvajal (yellow card) 68'; Casemiro (yellow card) 83'	Stadium: Westfalenstadion; Attendance: 65,829; Referee: Damir Skomina (Slovenia)

== Team statistics ==
Competition	Record							
Competition	G	W	D	L	GF	GA	GD	Win %
Bundesliga	34	22	5	7	80	38	+42	64.71
DFB-Pokal	6	5	0	1	10	2	+8	83.33
DFL-Supercup	1	1	0	0	4	2	+2	100.00
Champions League	10	6	0	4	18	13	+5	60.00
Total	51	34	5	12	113	55	+58	66.67
Updated: 17 May 2014

== Squad information ==
=== Squad and statistics ===
==== Squad, appearances and goals ====
No.	Pos	Nat	Player	Total		Bundesliga		DFB-Pokal		DFL-Supercup		Champions League	
No.	Pos	Nat	Player	Apps	Goals	Apps	Goals	Apps	Goals	Apps	Goals	Apps	Goals
1	GK	(Germany) GER	Roman Weidenfeller	43	0	30	0	3	0	1	0	9	0
2	DF	(Germany) GER	Manuel Friedrich	15	1	11	1	2	0	0	0	2	0
4	DF	(Serbia) SRB	Neven Subotić	15	0	10	0	0	0	1	0	4	0
5	MF	(Germany) GER	Sebastian Kehl	27	2	17	1	4	0	0+1	0	5	1
6	MF	(Germany) GER	Sven Bender	27	1	19	1	1+1	0	1	0	5	0
7	MF	(Germany) GER	Jonas Hofmann	39	3	26	2	1+4	1	0	0	0+8	0
8	MF	(Germany) GER	İlkay Gündoğan	3	1	1	0	1	0	1	1	0	0
9	FW	(Poland) POL	Robert Lewandowski	48	28	33	20	5	2	1	0	9	6
10	MF	(Armenia) ARM	Henrikh Mkhitaryan	46	13	31	9	5	2	0	0	10	2
11	FW	(Germany) GER	Marco Reus	44	23	30	16	4	0	1	2	9	5
14	MF	(Serbia) SRB	Miloš Jojić	15	4	10	4	2	0	0	0	1+2	0
15	DF	(Germany) GER	Mats Hummels	34	2	23	2	4	0	1	0	6	0
16	MF	(Poland) POL	Jakub Błaszczykowski	25	3	16	2	1+1	0	1	0	5+1	1
17	FW	(Gabon) GAB	Pierre-Emerick Aubameyang	48	16	32	13	3+3	2	0+1	0	3+6	1
18	MF	(Turkey) TUR	Nuri Şahin	48	2	34	2	4	0	1	0	9	0
19	MF	(Germany) GER	Kevin Großkreutz	50	3	33	1	6	1	1	0	10	1
20	GK	(Australia) AUS	Mitchell Langerak	9	0	4	0	3	0	0	0	1+1	0
21	MF	(Germany) GER	Oliver Kirch	12	1	8	1	1+2	0	0	0	1	0
23	FW	(Germany) GER	Julian Schieber	20	1	12	0	1+3	1	0	0	0+4	0
24	DF	(Germany) GER	Marian Sarr	3	0	2	0	0	0	0	0	1	0
25	DF	(Greece) GRE	Sokratis Papastathopoulos	42	1	28	1	5	0	0+1	0	6+2	0
26	DF	(Poland) POL	Łukasz Piszczek	29	3	19	3	3+1	0	0	0	4+2	0
29	DF	(Germany) GER	Marcel Schmelzer	34	1	25	1	3	0	1	0	5	0
30	DF	(Germany) GER	Koray Günter	1	0	1	0	0	0	0	0	0	0
34	FW	(Germany) GER	Marvin Ducksch	8	1	6	0	0+2	1	0	0	0	0
37	DF	(Germany) GER	Erik Durm	29	0	19	0	3	0	0	0	5+2	0
Sources
Last updated: 17 May 2014

==== Goalscorers ====
All competitions

Scorer	Goals
(Poland) Robert Lewandowski	28
(Germany) Marco Reus	23
(Gabon) P.-E. Aubameyang	16
(Armenia) Henrikh Mkhitaryan	13
(Serbia) Miloš Jojić	4
(Poland) J. Błaszczykowski	3
(Germany) Jonas Hofmann	3
(Poland) Łukasz Piszczek	3
(Germany) Kevin Großkreutz	3
(Turkey) Nuri Şahin	2
(Germany) Sebastian Kehl	2
(Germany) Mats Hummels	2
(Germany) İlkay Gündoğan	1
(Germany) Marvin Ducksch	1
(Germany) Marcel Schmelzer	1
(Greece) Sokratis	1
(Germany) Julian Schieber	1
(Germany) Sven Bender	1
(Germany) Manuel Friedrich	1

Bundesliga

Scorer	Goals
(Poland) Robert Lewandowski	20
(Germany) Marco Reus	16
(Gabon) P.-E. Aubameyang	13
(Armenia) Henrikh Mkhitaryan	9
(Serbia) Miloš Jojić	4
(Poland) Łukasz Piszczek	3
(Poland) J. Błaszczykowski	2
(Turkey) Nuri Şahin	2
(Germany) Mats Hummels	2
(Germany) Jonas Hofmann	2
(Germany) Marcel Schmelzer	1
(Greece) Sokratis	1
(Germany) Sven Bender	1
(Germany) Manuel Friedrich	1
(Germany) Sebastian Kehl	1
(Germany) Kevin Großkreutz	1

DFB-Pokal

Scorer	Goals
(Poland) Robert Lewandowski	2
(Gabon) P.-E. Aubameyang	2
(Armenia) Henrikh Mkhitaryan	2
(Germany) Kevin Großkreutz	1
(Germany) Marvin Ducksch	1
(Germany) Julian Schieber	1
(Germany) Jonas Hofmann	1

Champions League

Scorer	Goals
(Poland) Robert Lewandowski	6
(Germany) Marco Reus	5
(Armenia) Henrikh Mkhitaryan	2
(Poland) J. Błaszczykowski	1
(Gabon) P.-E. Aubameyang	1
(Germany) Kevin Großkreutz	1
(Germany) Sebastian Kehl	1

DFL-Supercup

Scorer	Goals
(Germany) Marco Reus	2
(Germany) İlkay Gündoğan	1

=== Disciplinary record ===
==== Bookings ====
No.	Player	Total			Bundesliga			DFB-Pokal			DFL-Supercup			Champions League		
No.	Player	Yellow card	(yellow card) (red card)	Red card	Yellow card	(yellow card) (red card)	Red card	Yellow card	(yellow card) (red card)	Red card	Yellow card	(yellow card) (red card)	Red card	Yellow card	(yellow card) (red card)	Red card
1	Roman Weidenfeller	1	0	1	1	0	0	0	0	0	0	0	0	0	0	1
2	Manuel Friedrich	2	0	0	2	0	0	0	0	0	0	0	0	0	0	0
4	Neven Subotić	2	0	0	1	0	0	0	0	0	0	0	0	1	0	0
5	Sebastian Kehl	4	0	0	0	0	0	1	0	0	0	0	0	3	0	0
6	Sven Bender	4	0	0	2	0	0	0	0	0	0	0	0	2	0	0
7	Jonas Hofmann	1	0	0	1	0	0	0	0	0	0	0	0	0	0	0
9	Robert Lewandowski	5	0	0	2	0	0	0	0	0	0	0	0	3	0	0
10	Henrikh Mkhitaryan	5	0	0	5	0	0	0	0	0	0	0	0	0	0	0
11	Marco Reus	8	0	0	6	0	0	0	0	0	0	0	0	2	0	0
14	Miloš Jojić	3	0	0	2	0	0	0	0	0	0	0	0	1	0	0
15	Mats Hummels	5	0	1	4	0	1	0	0	0	0	0	0	1	0	0
16	Jakub Błaszczykowski	1	0	0	0	0	0	1	0	0	0	0	0	0	0	0
17	Pierre-Emerick Aubameyang	4	0	0	1	0	0	2	0	0	0	0	0	1	0	0
18	Nuri Şahin	4	0	0	4	0	0	0	0	0	0	0	0	0	0	0
19	Kevin Großkreutz	4	0	0	3	0	0	0	0	0	0	0	0	1	0	0
21	Oliver Kirch	1	0	0	1	0	0	0	0	0	0	0	0	0	0	0
24	Marian Sarr	2	0	0	1	0	0	0	0	0	0	0	0	1	0	0
25	Sokratis Papastathopoulos	6	1	0	5	1	0	1	0	0	0	0	0	0	0	0
26	Łukasz Piszczek	1	0	0	0	0	0	0	0	0	0	0	0	1	0	0
29	Marcel Schmelzer	3	0	0	1	0	0	1	0	0	0	0	0	1	0	0
Totals		66	1	2	42	1	1	6	0	0	0	0	0	18	0	1
Sources
Last updated: 19 April 2014

==== Suspensions ====
Player	No. of matches served	Reason	Competition served in	Date served	Opponent(s)	Source
Roman Weidenfeller	1	Red card vs. Napoli	UCL	1 October	Marseille	
Mats Hummels	1	Red card vs. Borussia Mönchengladbach	Bundesliga	19 October	Hannover 96	
Marco Reus	1	Fifth yellow card	Bundesliga	22 February	1. FC Nürnberg	
Robert Lewandowski	1	Third yellow card	UCL	19 March	Real Madrid	
Sebastian Kehl	1	Third yellow card	UCL	2 April	Real Madrid	
Henrikh Mkhitaryan	1	Fifth yellow card	Bundesliga	19 April	Mainz 05	

=== Transfers ===
==== In ====
No.	Pos.	Name	Age	EU	Moving from	Type	Transfer Window	Contract ends	Transfer fee	Sources
10	MF	Henrikh Mkhitaryan	24	Yes	Shakhtar Donetsk	Transfer	Summer	2017	€25M	
17	FW	Pierre-Emerick Aubameyang	24	No	Saint-Étienne	Transfer	Summer	2018	€13M	
25	DF	Sokratis Papastathopoulos	25	Yes	Werder Bremen	Transfer	Summer	2016	€9.5M	
	DF	Lasse Sobiech	22	Yes	Greuther Fürth	Loan Return	Summer	2014		
14	MF	Miloš Jojić	21	Yes	Partizan	Transfer	Winter	2018	€2.5M	

==== Out ====
No.	Pos.	Name	Age	EU	Moving to	Type	Transfer Window	Transfer fee	Sources
10	MF	Mario Götze	21	Yes	Bayern Munich	Transfer	Summer	€37M	
7	MF	Moritz Leitner	20	Yes	VfB Stuttgart	Loan (2 seasons)	Summer	Loan	
27	DF	Felipe Santana	27	No	Schalke 04	Transfer	Summer	€1M	
	DF	Julian Koch	22	Yes	Mainz 05	Transfer	Summer	Undisclosed	
	FW	Daniel Ginczek	22	Yes	1. FC Nürnberg	Transfer	Summer	Undisclosed	
22	DF	Patrick Owomoyela	33	Yes	None	Free	Summer	Free	
