= Piotr Azikiewicz =

Polish footballer (born 1995)

Personal information
- Full name: Piotr Azikiewicz
- Date of birth: 21 April 1995 (age 31)
- Place of birth: Legnica, Poland
- Height: 1.83 m (6 ft 0 in)
- Position: Left-back

Team information
- Current team: Odra Ścinawa
- Number: 50

Youth career
- Prochowiczanka Prochowice
- 2009–2011: Zagłębie Lubin

Senior career*
Years	Team	Apps	(Gls)
2011–2013	Zagłębie Lubin (ME)	24	(2)
2013–2014	Zagłębie Lubin II	9	(0)
2011–2017	Zagłębie Lubin	11	(1)
2015	→ Rozwój Katowice (loan)	11	(0)
2015	→ Kotwica Kołobrzeg (loan)	14	(1)
2016	→ Górnik Polkowice (loan)	14	(1)
2017	→ Kotwica Kołobrzeg (loan)	9	(0)
2017–2021	Górnik Polkowice	105	(10)
2021–2022	Miedź Legnica	17	(0)
2021–2022	Miedź Legnica II	10	(0)
2022–2023	Wisła Puławy	6	(0)
2023	Prochowiczanka Prochowice	10	(0)
2023–2024	ŁKS Łomża	17	(0)
2024–2025	Górnik Polkowice	6	(0)
2025	Prochowiczanka Prochowice	9	(2)
2025	Dozamet Nowa Sól	8	(0)
2025–	Odra Ścinawa	18	(4)

International career
2010	Poland U15	4	(0)
2011	Poland U16	8	(1)
2012	Poland U17	11	(2)
2013	Poland U18	1	(0)
2013	Poland U19	1	(0)
- * Club domestic league appearances and goals as of 22:00, 30 June 2026 (UTC)

Piotr Azikiewicz (born 21 April 1995) is a Polish professional footballer who plays as a left-back for IV liga Lower Silesia club Odra Ścinawa.

== Club career ==
Azikiewicz started his career with Zagłębie Lubin.

He made his debut for Zagłębie in a 1–0 defeat to Cracovia on 23 August 2013.

== International career ==
He also played at the 2012 UEFA European Under-17 Football Championship.

== Honours ==
Górnik Polkowice

- II liga: 2020–21
- III liga, group III: 2018–19
- Polish Cup (Legnica regionals): 2017–18

Miedź Legnica

- I liga: 2021–22

Odra Ścinawa

- Regional league Legnica: 2025–26
