= Nieuw-Schoonebeek =

- Village
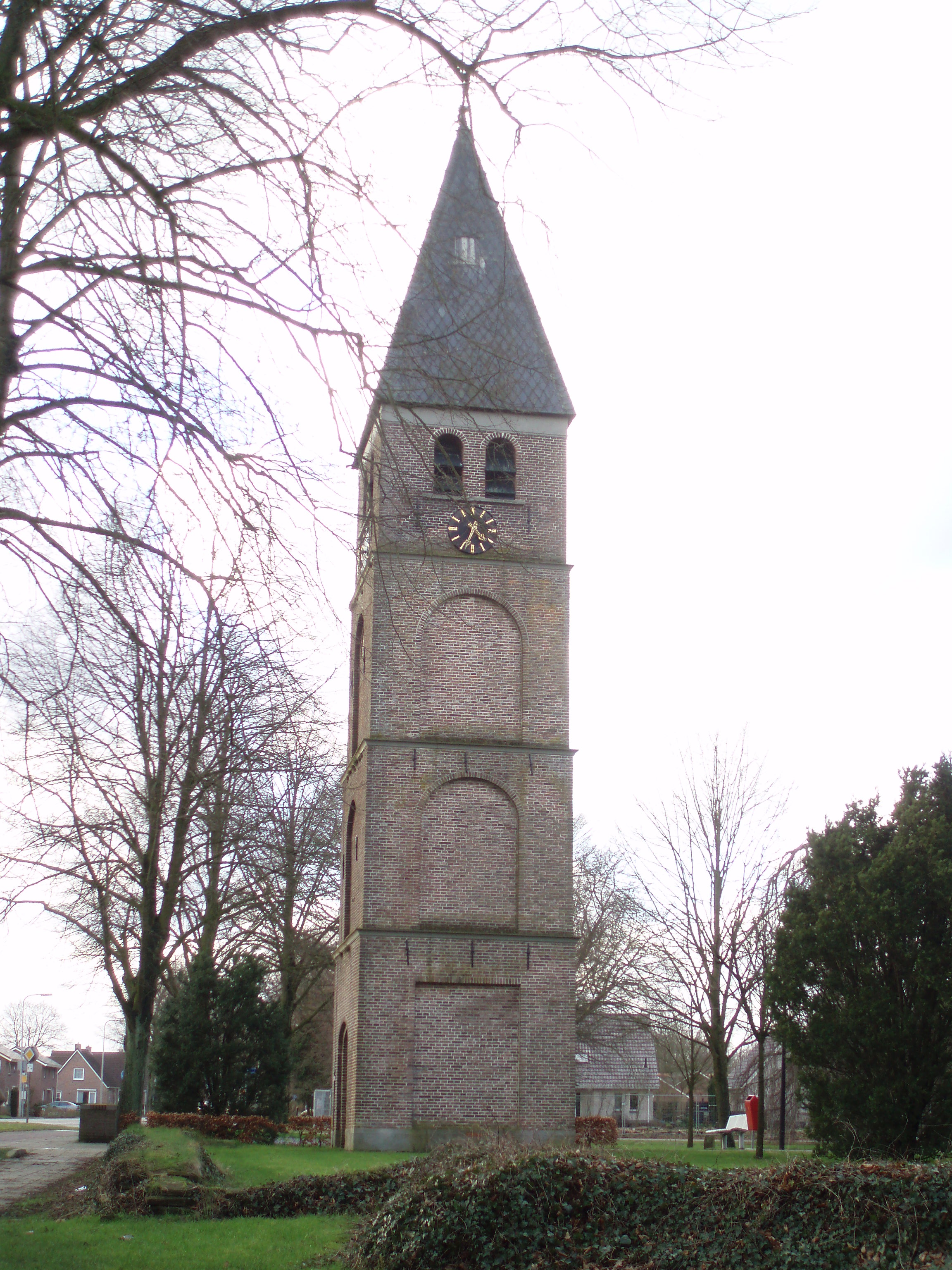
- Churchtower in Nieuw-Schoonebeek

- Location in province of Drenthe in the Netherlands Nieuw-Schoonebeek (Netherlands)
- Coordinates: 52°38′N 6°59′E
- Country: Netherlands
- Province: Drenthe
- Municipality: Emmen
- Established: 1814

Area
  - Total: 17.69 km^{2} (6.83 sq mi)
- Elevation: 14 m (46 ft)

Population (2021)
  - Total: 1,285
  - Density: 72.64/km^{2} (188.1/sq mi)
- Postal code: 7761
- Dialing code: 0591

Nieuw-Schoonebeek is a village in the Netherlands and is part of the Emmen municipality in Drenthe.

== History ==
Nieuw-Schoonebeek started as a peat exploitation settlement along the road from Schoonebeek to Meppen. Around 1805, settlers from neighbouring Twist in Germany moved into the area. The village was officially founded in 1814. In 1849, a Catholic church was built in Nieuw-Schoonebeek, and was replaced in 1966–67 with a new church. The tower of the old church has remained standing.

In 1943, oil was discovered in neighbouring Schoonebeek. The population successfully sabotaged the wells which prevented the Germans from knowing much oil was underneath the ground. After the war, pumpjacks became a feature of the landscape around the village. About 190 wells were dug in Nieuw-Schoonebeek.

Nieuw-Schoonebeek is home to several boôs, little sheds where cow shepherds could spend the night with their cattle.

== Notable people ==
- Pascal Huser (born 1995), footballer

== Gallery ==
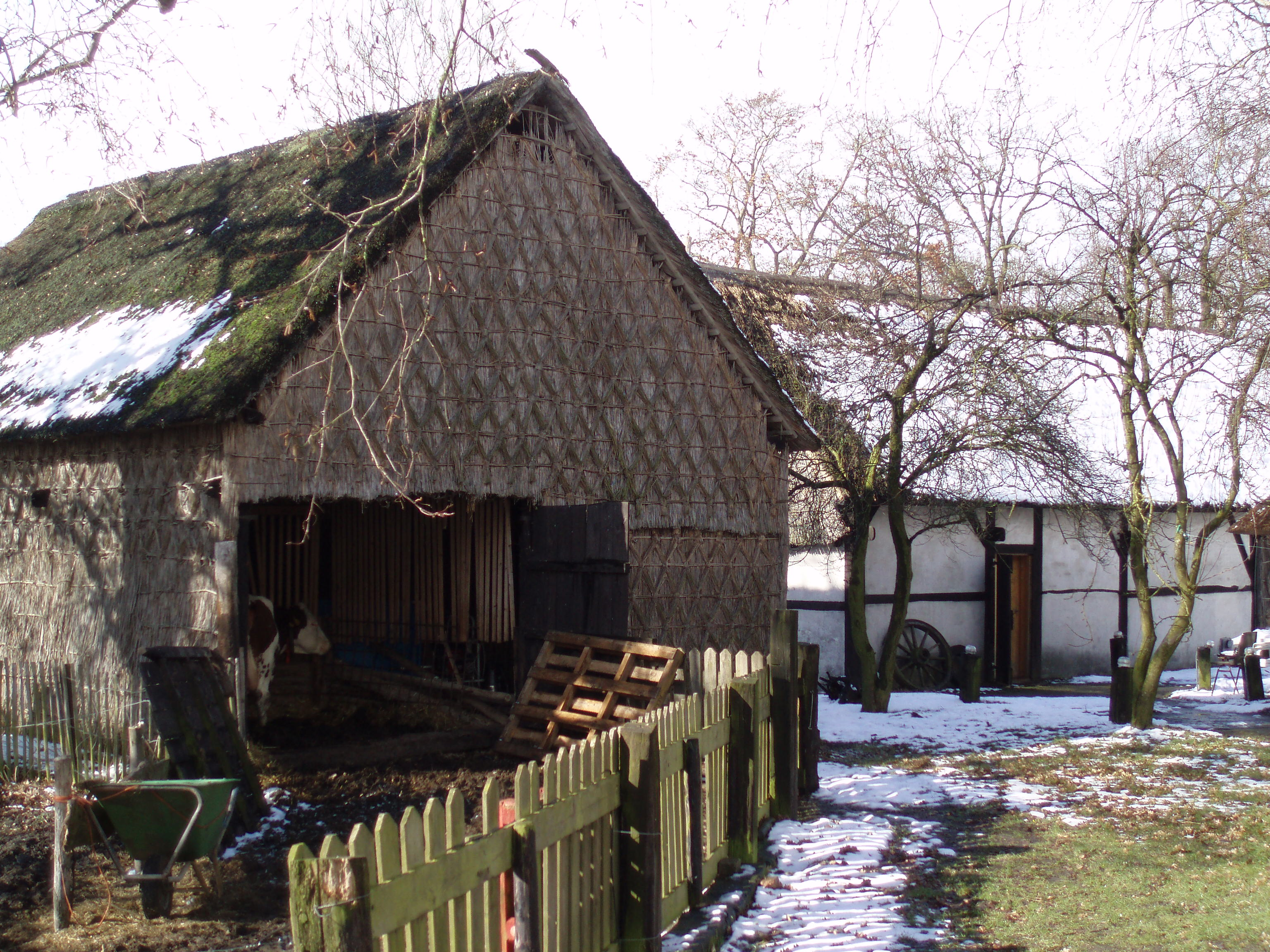
Hekman's boô

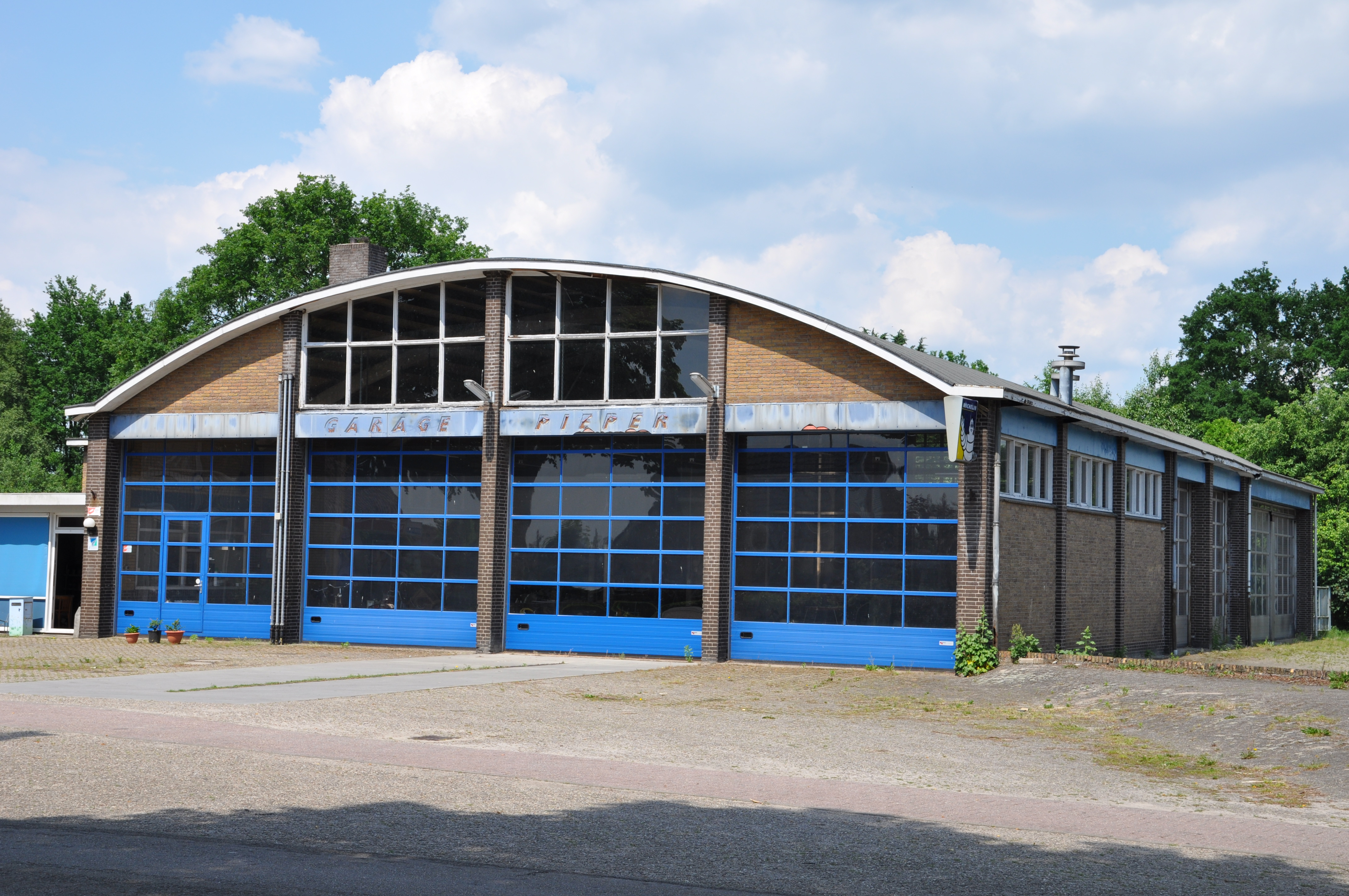
Automobile repair shop

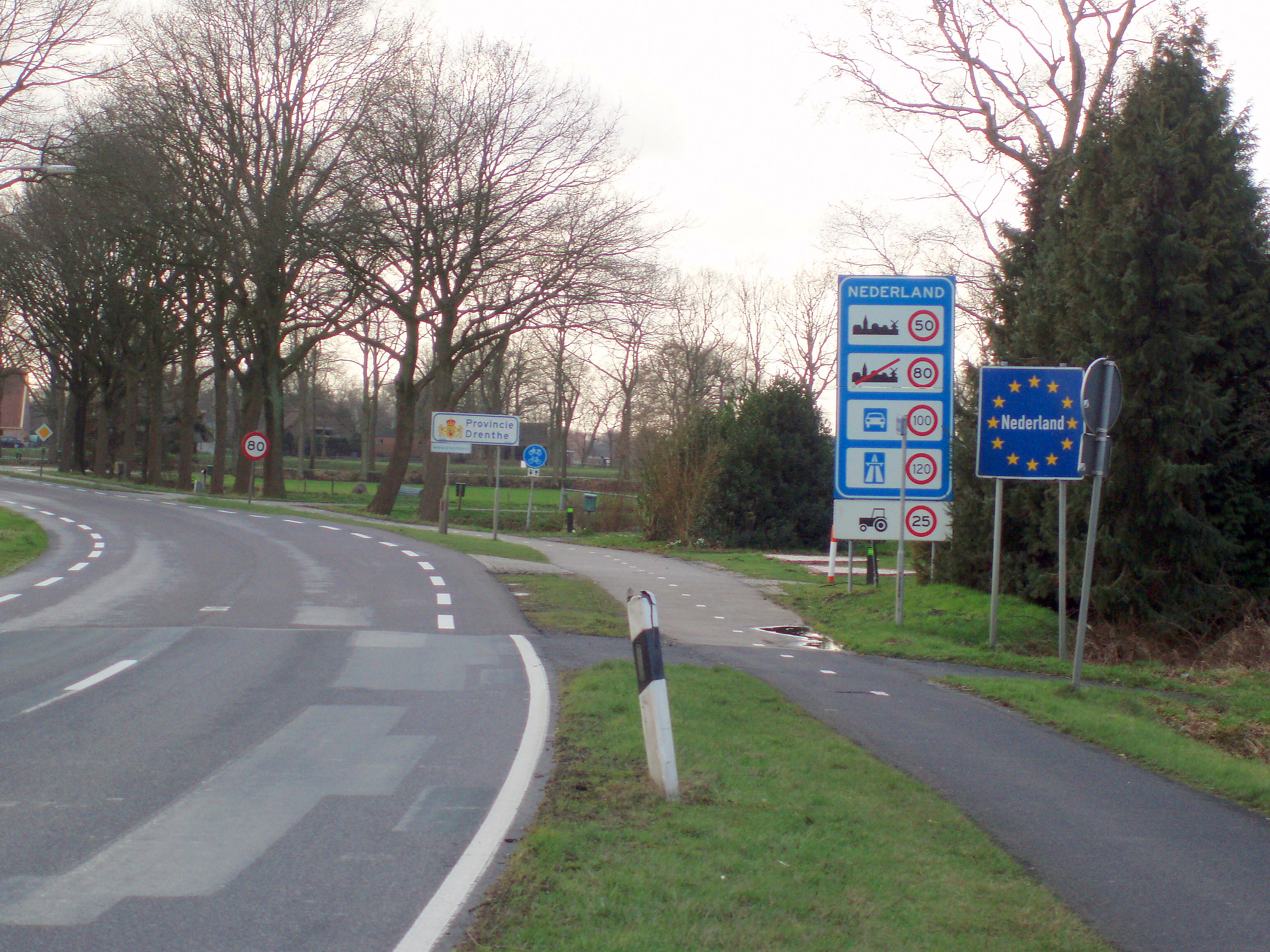
Border crossing
