= Rafał Włodarczyk =

Polish association football player

Personal information
- Date of birth: 26 January 1995 (age 31)
- Place of birth: Pruszków, Poland
- Height: 1.74 m (5 ft 9 in)
- Position: Left-back

Team information
- Current team: Hutnik Warsaw
- Number: 95

Youth career
- –2008: Ambra Ołtarzew
- 2008–2011: Mazur Karczew

Senior career*
Years	Team	Apps	(Gls)
2011–2012	Mazur Karczew	17	(2)
2012–2015	Hertha BSC	0	(0)
2014–2015	→ Ząbkovia Ząbki (loan)	5	(0)
2016	Znicz Pruszków	12	(0)
2016–2017	Olimpia Zambrów	22	(1)
2017	Znicz Pruszków	14	(1)
2018–2024	Błonianka Błonie	163	(27)
2024–	Hutnik Warsaw	77	(3)

International career
2011–2012	Poland U17	9	(0)
2013	Poland U19	3	(0)
- * Club domestic league appearances and goals as of 10:08, 15 June 2026 (UTC)

Rafał Włodarczyk (born 26 January 1995) is a Polish professional footballer who plays as a left-back for IV liga Masovia club Hutnik Warsaw.

== Club career ==
Włodarczyk started his career with Polish III liga club Mazur Karczew. In 2014, Włodarczyk was sent on loan to I liga club Ząbkovia Ząbki from German Bundesliga club Hertha BSC, where he made five league appearances. On 15 November 2014, he debuted for Ząbkovia Ząbki during a 0-1 loss to GKS Tychy.

Before the second half of the 2015–16 season, Włodarczyk signed for Znicz Pruszków in the Polish third division, helping them earn promotion to I liga. Before the second half of the 2017–18 season, he signed for Polish fifth division team Błonianka Błonie, helping them earn promotion to the Polish fourth division.

On 16 January 2024, Włodarczyk joined another IV liga outfit Hutnik Warsaw.

== International career ==
He represented Poland at the 2012 UEFA European Under-17 Championship, helping them reach the semi-finals.

== Honours ==
Błonianka Błonie

- IV liga Masovia South: 2019–20
- Polish Cup (Warsaw regionals): 2018–19
