= Jadiel Pereira da Gama =

Dutch footballer (born 2009)

Personal information
- Date of birth: 15 December 2009 (age 16)
- Place of birth: Almere, Netherlands
- Height: 1.82 m (6 ft 0 in)
- Position: Defensive midfielder

Team information
- Current team: PEC Zwolle
- Number: 26

Youth career
- VV AS '80
- 2017–2025: PEC Zwolle

Senior career*
Years	Team	Apps	(Gls)
2025–	PEC Zwolle	10	(0)

International career^{‡}
2024–	Netherlands U16	7	(1)
- * Club domestic league appearances and goals as of 21 May 2026 ‡ National team caps and goals as of 20:23, 15 August 2025 (UTC)

Jadiel Pereira da Gama (born 15 December 2009) is a Dutch professional footballer who plays as a defensive midfielder for Eredivisie club PEC Zwolle.

== Club career ==
A youth product of VV AS '80, Pereira da Gama joined the academy of PEC Zwolle in 2017, where he finished his development. On 2 July 2025, he signed his first professional contract with the club for 3 years. Pereira da Gama made his senior and professional debut for PEC Zwolle in a 2–0 Eredivisie win over SC Telstar on 15 August 2025. At 15 years and 243 days old, he became the youngest-ever debutant in the history of the league. He took the record from Wim Kras who broke the record in 1959.

== International career ==
Pereira da Gama was first called up to the Netherlands U16s for a training camp in September 2024.

== Personal life ==
Born in the Netherlands, Pereira da Gama is of Cape Verdean descent. His brother Haniël Pereira da Gama is a product of the Ajax Youth Academy.
