= Boô =

Old Saxon building

Coordinates: 52°38′45″N 6°58′17″E

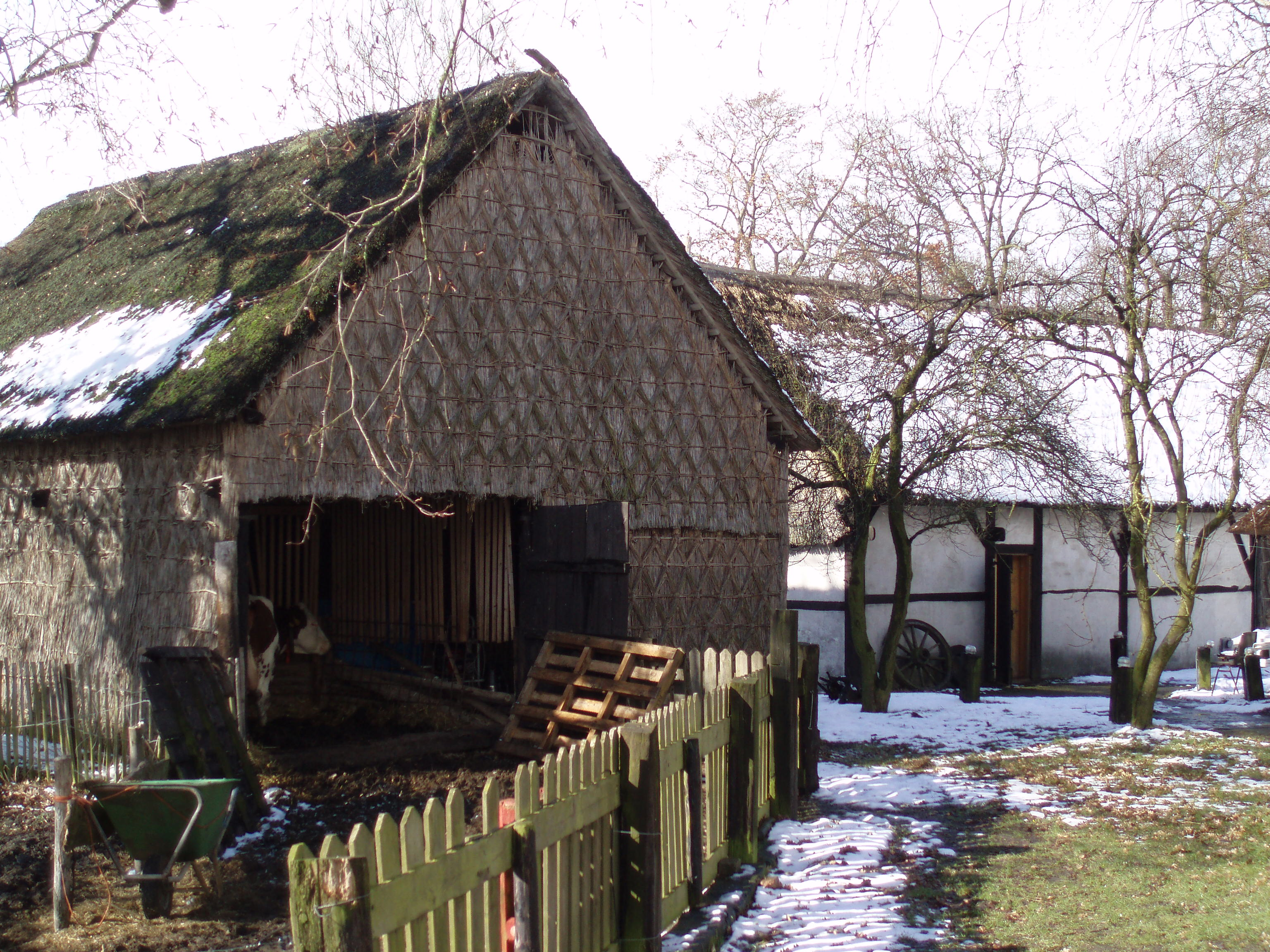
Hekman's boô in Schoonebeek

A boô (also spelled boo or boe) is an old Saxon building where a farmer could spend the night with his cattle if he let them graze far outside the village. The buildings, which had separate areas for cattle and farmer to live, were made with cheap materials. Walls were made of straw or braided twigs covered in cow manure or loam; the roofs were also made of straw.

== Etymology ==
The word boô is a cognate of the German word 'Bude' which means 'shack'. The circumflex on the second 'o' indicates that a letter is left out. In Danish, 'bo' means house. The word boô is Low German.

== History ==
A (usually unmarried) cattle farmer who spent time in a boô was called a boô-heer and was employed by a so-called "broodheer" (literally: bread lord). Once every fourteen days, the boô-heer would return to the farm for food supplies and clean clothes. He could keep the earnings of his only milk cow and the eggs his chickens laid.

The villages of Schoonebeek and Nieuw-Schoonebeek in the border area with Germany in the Dutch province of Drenthe are the only places where these buildings can be found. Because of this, Nieuw-Schoonebeek was known as Boôëndorf on the German side of the border. The boôs that can be found there today are replicas, which were not built in the original boôs' locations.

The last genuine boô, the Wilmsboô (owned by the Drents Historical Society De Spiker) in Nieuw Schoonebeek (1640) burnt down in October 2004. The historical society suspected arson as the building had no gas or electricity. In March 2005, a restoration programme was begun. Before it burned down, plans were afoot to have the original building listed on the European list of monuments.

Another replica, the Hekmansboô, is on the terrain of the dairy farm "De Katshaar" (not its original location) along the Europaweg (N863) in Schoonebeek.
