= Wim Kras =

Dutch footballer (1944–2023)

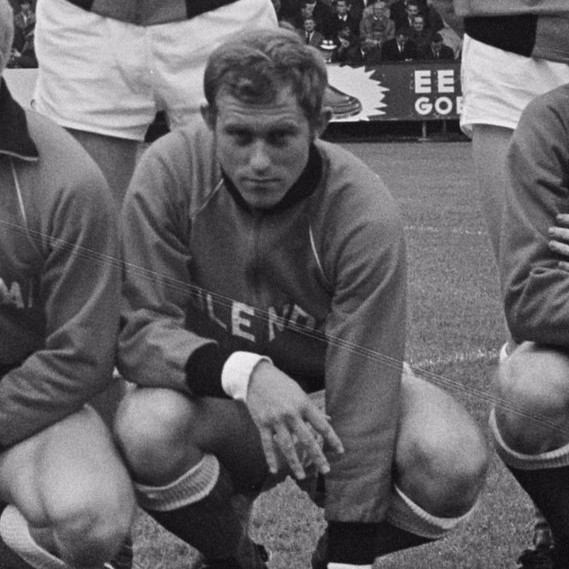
- Kras in 1966

Personal information
- Date of birth: 5 February 1944
- Place of birth: Volendam, German-occupied Netherlands
- Date of death: 14 February 2023 (aged 79)
- Place of death: Volendam, Netherlands
- Height: 1.85 m (6 ft 1 in)
- Position: Forward

Youth career
- Volendam

Senior career*
Years	Team	Apps	(Gls)
1959–1973	Volendam	400	(90)

International career
- Netherlands U16
- Netherlands U18
- * Club domestic league appearances and goals

Wim Kras (5 February 1944 – 14 February 2023) was a Dutch footballer who played as a forward for Volendam.

== Club career ==
Kras joined the academy at hometown club Volendam, making his debut for the club on 22 November 1959 in a 3–0 loss against Ajax. As a result of starting the game, Kras became the youngest player in Eredivisie history, at the age of 15 years and 290 days. This record was broken on 15 August 2025 by Jadiel Pereira da Gama. On 15 May 1960, Kras broke another Eredivisie record, becoming the league's youngest goalscorer during a 3–1 loss against MVV Maastricht, at the age of 16 years and 100 days. During his career, Kras made 400 league appearances for Volendam, scoring 90 times.

== International career ==
Kras represented the Netherlands at under-16 and under-18 level.

== Personal life and death ==
Kras died on 14 February 2023, at the age of 79.
