= Thom Haye =

Indonesian footballer (born 1995)

- Haye playing for Heerenveen in 2023

Personal information
- Full name: Thom Jan Marinus Haye
- Date of birth: 9 February 1995 (age 31)
- Place of birth: Amsterdam, Netherlands
- Height: 1.87 m (6 ft 2 in)
- Position: Midfielder

Team information
- Current team: Persib Bandung
- Number: 33

Youth career
- –2006: AFC
- 2006–2012: AZ

Senior career*
Years	Team	Apps	(Gls)
2012–2016	AZ	56	(1)
2016–2018	Willem II	65	(5)
2018–2019	Lecce	13	(0)
2019–2020	ADO Den Haag	9	(0)
2020	→ NAC (loan)	6	(0)
2020–2022	NAC	55	(5)
2022–2024	Heerenveen	81	(7)
2024–2025	Almere City	29	(0)
2025–	Persib Bandung	35	(6)

International career^{‡}
2009–2010	Netherlands U15	5	(0)
2010–2011	Netherlands U16	6	(0)
2011–2012	Netherlands U17	21	(3)
2012–2013	Netherlands U19	8	(2)
2014	Netherlands U20	1	(0)
2015	Netherlands U21	9	(0)
2024–	Indonesia	25	(3)
Medal record
Men's football
Representing Netherlands
UEFA European Under-17 Championship
Winner	2011 Serbia
Winner	2012 Slovenia
Representing Indonesia
FIFA ASEAN Cup
Winner	2026 Indonesia
- * Club domestic league appearances and goals as of 25 October 2026 ‡ National team caps and goals as of 5 October 2026

Thom Jan Marinus Haye (born 9 February 1995) is a professional footballer who plays as a midfielder for Super League club Persib Bandung. Born in the Netherlands, he represents the Indonesia national team.

A product of AZ academy, Haye made his first-team debut in 2014, before moving on to clubs such as Willem II, Lecce in Italy, ADO Den Haag, NAC Breda, and Heerenveen.

Haye represented the Netherlands at various youth levels from under-15 to under-21, becoming European under-17 champions twice in 2011 and 2012, before switching his international allegiance to Indonesia in 2024 through naturalization.

== Club career ==
=== AZ ===
Haye was born in Amsterdam and is a youth exponent from AZ. He signed his first contract for AZ in February 2011. On 23 February 2014, he made his full debut for AZ in the Eredivisie against Ajax in a 4–0 away defeat, coming on as a 70th-minute substitute for Celso Ortíz. Haye scored his first professional goal on 24 September 2014, securing his club's advancement in the KNVB Cup in a 1–0 away win over EVV. He became a starter in the 2015–16 season, before making his debut in the UEFA Europa League in the 2016–17 season.

=== Willem II ===
On 19 June 2016, Haye signed a two-year deal with Willem II, after his contract with AZ expired. He made his debut on 6 August in a 4–1 home loss to Vitesse.

=== Lecce ===
On 31 May 2018, Haye signed a two-year contract with Italian Serie B club Lecce. He made his debut on 7 August, in the Coppa Italia match against Feralpisalò, which ended in a 1–0 win after extra time. He made his Serie B debut on 25 September, when he came on as a substitute in the second half of the 3–0 win against Livorno. Haye would go on to make 13 appearances in Serie B that season, which ended in promotion to Serie A.

On 2 September 2019, after having failed to make an appearance in the top flight, he terminated his contract by mutual agreement.

=== ADO Den Haag ===
On 12 September 2019, Haye returned to the Netherlands to join Eredivisie side ADO Den Haag on a two-year deal. He made his first appearance upon his return in a 3–0 away loss to Emmen on 27 September, coming on as a late substitute for John Goossens. He mostly appeared as a substitute during his six months with ADO.

=== NAC Breda ===
In January 2020, Haye was sent on a six-month loan to NAC Breda in the second-tier Eerste Divisie. He made his debut on 31 January in a 2–2 away draw against Excelsior.

Haye signed a permanent deal with NAC on 1 July 2020, penning a three-year contract.

=== Heerenveen ===
On 31 January 2022, Haye signed for Heerenveen for an undisclosed fee, on a contract until summer 2024. He made his debut for the club on 5 February as a starter in the 2–0 loss to Fortuna Sittard. He immediately impressed, growing into a key player in his first six months at the club. In 16 league appearances, he recorded five assists.

Haye and Heerenveen could not agree to a new contract at the end of the 2023–24 season, as he preferred a move abroad. He ended his stint at the club with seven goals and 13 assists in 86 appearances.

=== Almere City ===
On 13 September 2024, Haye signed for Almere City, on a contract until summer 2025. He made his debut for the club on 15 September as a substitute in the 0–0 draw to Heracles. He left the club upon the expiry of his contract.

=== Persib Bandung ===
On 27 August 2025, Haye officially joined Persib Bandung with a two-season contract.

== International career ==
Haye was a Netherlands youth international, having appeared for the national team between under-15 and under-21 level. He was part of the team that won the 2011 and 2012 UEFA European Under-17 Championship, as well as participating at the 2011 FIFA U-17 World Cup.

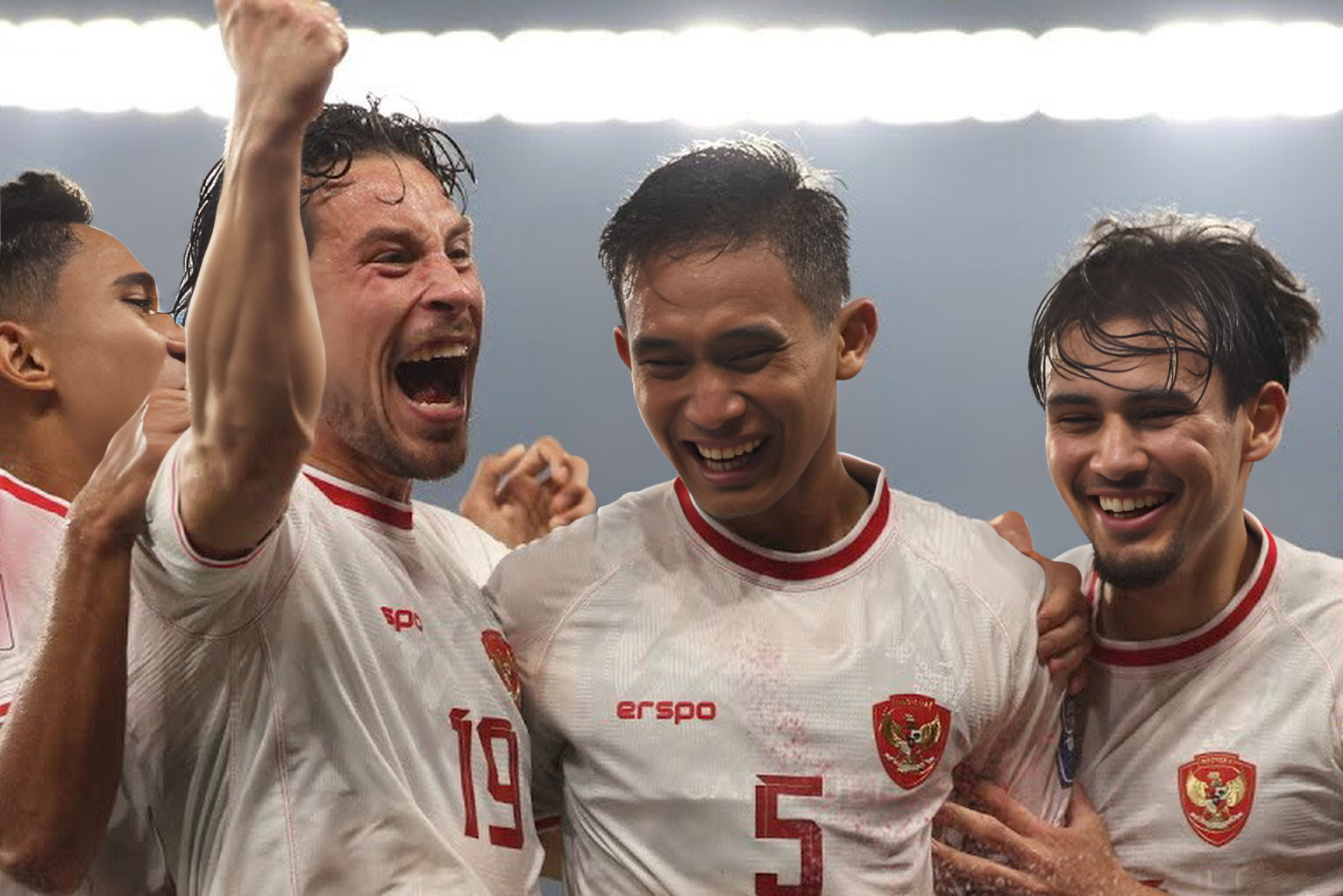
Haye (left) celebrates Indonesia's goal against the Philippines in 2024

In January 2024, Haye confirmed that he had decided to represent Indonesia at international level. On 7 March 2024, Haye was called up to the Indonesia national team for two 2026 FIFA World Cup qualification matches against Vietnam. He made his debut in the second match on 26 March 2024, providing an assist for Jay Idzes in an eventual 3–0 win. Then, on 11 June 2024, he scored his first international goal against the Philippines, a match Indonesia won 2–0 at home.

== Style of play ==
Haye started his career as an attacking midfielder but adapted to various positions as he progressed. During his two seasons with Willem II, he frequently operated as a left winger, utilising his strong and accurate right foot to cut inside from the flank. His versatility made him an exceptional utility player. As his career advanced, he transitioned to a more defensive role, primarily playing as a central midfielder.

== YouTube ==
The Haye Way

YouTube information
- Channel: The Haye Way
- Years active: 2024–present
- Subscribers: 400,000
- Views: 26.4 million
- Last updated: August 2025

Haye has a podcast YouTube channel called "The Haye Way", co-hosted with Dutch journalist Neal Petersen. The first season of the podcast commenced with its inaugural episode on 13 November 2024, focusing on Haye's profile beyond the football pitch. As of December 2024, the channel has amassed over 200,000 subscribers and over 3.1 million views.

== Personal life ==
Born in the Netherlands, Haye is of Indonesian descent.

On 18 March 2024, Haye officially obtained Indonesian citizenship.

== Career statistics ==
=== Club ===
As of match played 25 October 2026

Appearances and goals by club, season and competition
Club	Season	League			National Cup		Continental		Other		Total	
Club	Season	Division	Apps	Goals	Apps	Goals	Apps	Goals	Apps	Goals	Apps	Goals
AZ	2013–14	Eredivisie	3	0	0	0	1 (Note: Appearance(s) in UEFA Europa League)	0	0	0	4	0
AZ	2014–15	Eredivisie	28	0	4	1	—		0	0	32	1
AZ	2015–16	Eredivisie	25	1	3	0	9	0	0	0	37	1
AZ	Total		56	1	7	1	10	0	0	0	73	2
Willem II	2016–17	Eredivisie	32	3	1	0	—		—		33	3
Willem II	2017–18	Eredivisie	33	2	5	0	—		—		38	2
Willem II	Total		65	5	6	0	—		—		71	5
Lecce	2018–19	Serie B	13	0	2	0	—		—		15	0
Lecce	2019–20	Serie A	0	0	0	0	—		—		0	0
Lecce	Total		13	0	2	0	—		—		15	0
ADO Den Haag	2019–20	Eredivisie	9	0	0	0	—		—		9	0
NAC Breda (loan)	2019–20	Eerste Divisie	6	0	2	0	—		—		8	0
NAC Breda	2020–21	Eerste Divisie	34	0	0	0	—		3 (Note: Appearance(s) in promotion/relegation play-offs)	0	37	0
NAC Breda	2021–22	Eerste Divisie	21	5	2	3	—		0	0	23	8
NAC Breda	Total		55	5	3	3	—		3	0	61	8
Heerenveen	2021–22	Eredivisie	16	0	0	0	—		—		16	0
Heerenveen	2022–23	Eredivisie	33	3	3	0	—		—		36	3
Heerenveen	2023–24	Eredivisie	32	4	2	0	—		—		34	4
Heerenveen	Total		81	7	5	0	—		—		86	7
Almere City	2024–25	Eredivisie	29	0	1	0	—		—		30	0
Persib Bandung	2025–26	Super League	28	5	—		6 (Note: Appearances in AFC Champions League Two)	0	—		34	5
Persib Bandung	2026–27	Super League	7	1	0	0	4	0	1	0	12	1
Career total			349	24	25	4	20	0	4	0	398	28

=== International ===
As of match played 5 October 2026

Appearances and goals by national team and year
National team	Year	Apps	Goals
Indonesia	2024	10	2
Indonesia	2025	8	0
Indonesia	2026	7	1
Total		25	3

As of match played 31 July 2026
Indonesia score listed first, score column indicates score after each Haye goal

List of international goals scored by Thom Haye
No.	Date	Venue	Cap	Opponent	Score	Result	Competition
1	11 June 2024	Gelora Bung Karno Stadium, Jakarta, Indonesia	4	Philippines	1–0	2–0	2026 FIFA World Cup qualification
2	15 October 2024	Qingdao Youth Football Stadium, Qingdao, China	8	China	1–2	1–2	2026 FIFA World Cup qualification
3	31 July 2026	Chonburi Stadium, Chonburi, Thailand	20	Timor-Leste	2–0	3–0	2026 ASEAN Championship

== Honours ==
AZ

- KNVB Cup: 2012–13

Persib Bandung

- Super League: 2025–26

Netherlands U17

- UEFA European Under-17 Championship: 2011, 2012

Indonesia

- FIFA ASEAN Cup: 2026

Individual

- UEFA European Under-17 Championship Team of the Tournament: 2012
- Super League Best XI: 2025–26
- APPI Indonesian Football Award Best XI: 2025–26

== See also ==
- List of Indonesia international footballers born outside Indonesia
