= Pascal Huser =

Dutch footballer

Personal information
- Date of birth: 17 April 1995 (age 31)
- Place of birth: Nieuw-Schoonebeek, Netherlands
- Height: 1.84 m (6 ft 0 in)
- Position: Attacking midfielder

Team information
- Current team: VV Schoonebeek

Youth career
- VV Schoonebeek
- RJO Heerenveen/Emmen

Senior career*
Years	Team	Apps	(Gls)
2014–2016	Heerenveen	0	(0)
2015	→ MVV (loan)	17	(1)
2016–2017	Emmen	0	(0)
2017–2025	ACV	139	(21)

International career
2012	Netherlands U17	9	(1)
- * Club domestic league appearances and goals as of 9 July 2024

Pascal Huser (born 17 April 1995) is a Dutch football player who plays as a midfielder for VV Schoonebeek.

== Club career ==
Huser grew up in Nieuw-Schoonebeek and signed professional terms with Heerenveen, but was loaned out to MVV in January 2015 for the remainder of the 2015–16 Eerste Divisie season. He made his professional debut in the Eerste Divisie for MVV on 25 January 2015 in a game against VVV. Injuries prevented him from playing for Heerenveen and he moved back to former youth club Emmen in summer 2016.

He returned to childhood club VV Schoonebeek in 2025 after playing 8 years for Tweede Divisie outfit ACV.

== International career ==
Huser played 9 games for the Netherlands national under-21 football team and scored the goal with which the team qualified for the European Championships.

== Personal life ==
Huser works as a mortgage advisor in Emmen.
