= Gracjan Horoszkiewicz =

Polish footballer

Personal information
- Date of birth: 18 March 1995 (age 31)
- Place of birth: Głogów, Poland
- Height: 1.91 m (6 ft 3 in)
- Position: Centre-back

Team information
- Current team: SV Askania Schipkau

Youth career
- 2008–2011: Lubin Basin
- 2011–2012: Hertha BSC

Senior career*
Years	Team	Apps	(Gls)
2011–2014	Hertha BSC II	19	(0)
2014	Cracovia Kraków	0	(0)
2014–2016	Podbeskidzie Bielsko-Biała	4	(0)
2016	→ Chrobry Głogów (loan)	6	(0)
2017	ZFC Meuselwitz	28	(2)
2019	Bałtyk Gdynia	10	(0)
2020	Brandenburger SC Süd	1	(0)
2020–2021	SV Victoria Seelow	8	(0)
2021–	SV Askania Schipkau		

International career
2009–2010	Poland U16	10	(0)
2011–2012	Poland U17	15	(0)
2013	Poland U18	1	(0)
2012–2014	Poland U19	12	(1)
2014–2016	Poland U20	8	(0)
- * Club domestic league appearances and goals as of 29 May 2022

Gracjan Horoszkiewicz (born 18 March 1995) is a Polish professional footballer who plays as a centre-back for SV Askania Schipkau.

== Club career ==
A product of Hertha BSC youth academy, Horoszkiewicz kicked off his career with reserves in 2011, playing till 2014. At the end of the contract he was linked with a move to Serie A with AS Roma. He instead joined Cracovia Kraków, but was released only after 3 months. After being released, he signed for Podbeskidzie Bielsko-Biała.

== International career ==
Horoszkiewicz made his debut for Poland U20 against Italy.
