= Wilfried Sarr =

German footballer

Personal information
- Date of birth: 16 June 1996 (age 30)
- Place of birth: Essen, Germany
- Height: 1.90 m (6 ft 3 in)
- Position: Defender

Team information
- Current team: SpVg Schonnebeck
- Number: 3

Youth career
- 1999–2002: SV Leithe 19/65
- 2002–2005: Schwarz-Weiß Essen
- 2005–2009: Schalke 04
- 2009–2014: Bayer Leverkusen
- 2014–2015: Borussia Mönchengladbach

Senior career*
Years	Team	Apps	(Gls)
2015–2016	Borussia Mönchengladbach II	0	(0)
2016–2017	1. FC Kaiserslautern II	30	(0)
2017–2018	Rot-Weiß Erfurt	13	(0)
2018–2019	TSV Steinbach	11	(0)
2019–2020	TuS Ennepetal	6	(0)
2020–	SpVg Schonnebeck	7	(0)

International career
2012	Germany U17	3	(0)
2013	Germany U18	2	(0)
- * Club domestic league appearances and goals as of 12:49, 23 January 2021 (UTC)

Wilfried Sarr (born 16 June 1996) is a German footballer who plays as a defender for SpVg Schonnebeck in the Oberliga Niederrhein. He is the younger brother of Marian Sarr.

== Career ==
On 15 October 2019, TuS Ennepetal announced that they had signed Sarr.
