= Axel Kacou =

Footballer (born 1995)

Personal information
- Full name: Axel Zihiri Kacou
- Date of birth: 1 August 1995 (age 31)
- Place of birth: Saint-Denis, France
- Height: 1.87 m (6 ft 2 in)
- Position: Goalkeeper

Team information
- Current team: Feurs

Youth career
- 2002–2007: Stade Olympique de Paris
- 2007–2010: Ivry
- 2010–2012: Saint-Étienne

Senior career*
| Years | Team | Apps | (Gls) |
| 2012–2015 | Saint-Étienne II | 17 | (0) |
| 2015–2016 | Évian II | 4 | (0) |
| 2016–2018 | Tours II | 7 | (0) |
| 2016–2018 | Tours | 18 | (0) |
| 2019–2023 | Lyon-La Duchère (Note: The club was called AS Lyon-Duchère until June 2020 and SC Lyon from June 2020 to June 2021.) | 37 | (0) |
| 2019–2022 | Lyon-La Duchère II | 10 | (0) |
| 2023–2024 | Feurs | 1 | (0) |
| 2025– | Feurs | 15 | (0) |

International career^{‡}
| 2010–2011 | France U16 | 2 | (0) |
| 2015 | Ivory Coast U23 | 3 | (0) |
- * Club domestic league appearances and goals as of 14 February 2026 ‡ National team caps and goals as of 24 March 2018

Axel Zihiri Kacou (born 1 August 1995) is a professional footballer who plays as a goalkeeper for Championnat National 3 club Feurs. Born in France, he represented both France and Ivory Coast at youth international level.

== Club career ==
As a youth, Kacou trained at Clairefontaine, before joining Saint-Étienne.

In January 2016, Kacou joined Thonon Évian F.C. from Saint-Étienne, having agreed a 2 1/2-year contract.

In August 2016, he moved to Tours FC on a two-year deal.

In June 2019, he signed a two-year deal with Lyon-Duchère. Lyon-Duchère rebranded as Sporting Club Lyon in June 2020.

== International career ==
Kacou was born in France to Ivorian parents. He originally represented the France U16s. He then switched to the Ivory Coast U23s for the 2015 Toulon Tournament.

In October 2014, Kacou was first called up to the senior Ivory Coast squad. In November 2016, Kacou was called up to the senior Ivory Coast squad for a 2018 FIFA World Cup qualifiers match against Morocco. He was selected by new coach Marc Wilmots in May 2017 for a friendly against the Netherlands and a 2019 Africa Cup of Nations qualifier against Guinea. In March 2018, he was again called up for a friendly against Togo.
