= Dato Dartsimelia =

Georgian footballer

Personal information
- Date of birth: 28 January 1995 (age 31)
- Place of birth: Tbilisi, Georgia
- Height: 1.82 m (6 ft 0 in)
- Position: Forward

Team information
- Current team: FC Kolkheti-1913 Poti
- Number: 40

Senior career*
Years	Team	Apps	(Gls)
2011–2013	FC Locomotive Tbilisi	39	(14)
2013	→ FC Algeti Marneuli (loan)	3	(0)
2014	FC Sevastopol	0	(0)
2015	Nyíregyháza	8	(0)
2016	FC Locomotive Tbilisi	3	(0)
2019-	Kolkheti Poti	9	(1)
- * Club domestic league appearances and goals as of 16 August 2019

Dato Dartsimelia (Georgian: დათო დარციმელია; born 28 January 1995 in Tbilisi) is a Georgian football player.

== Club career ==
He made his professional debut in the Nemzeti Bajnokság I for Nyíregyháza Spartacus FC on 28 February 2015 in a game against Budapest Honvéd FC.
