= Netherlands national under-17 football team =

National association football team

Netherlands U-17
- Nickname: Oranje
- Association: Royal Dutch Football Association (KNVB)
- Confederation: UEFA (Europe)
- Head coach: Pieter Schrassert Bert
- FIFA code: NED
First colours	Second colours

World Cup
- Appearances: 4 (first in 2005)
- Best result: Third place (2005)

European Championship
- Appearances: 15 (first in 2002)
- Best result: Champions (2011, 2012, 2018, 2019)
Medal record
Men's football
FIFA U-17 World Cup
Bronze medal – third place	2005 Peru	Team
UEFA European U-17 Championship
Gold medal – first place	2011 Serbia	Team
Gold medal – first place	2012 Slovenia	Team
Gold medal – first place	2018 England	Team
Gold medal – first place	2019 Ireland	Team
Silver medal – second place	2005 Italy	Team
Silver medal – second place	2009 Germany	Team
Silver medal – second place	2014 Malta	Team
Silver medal – second place	2022 Israel	Team
Bronze medal – third place	2008 Turkey	Team
Bronze medal – third place	2016 Azerbaijan	Team

The Netherlands national under-17 football team represents the Netherlands in international football at this age level and is controlled by the Koninklijke Nederlandse Voetbalbond — KNVB, the governing body for football in the Netherlands.

== Competitive record ==
=== FIFA U-16/17 World Cup record ===
Year	Round	Position	Pld	W	D*	L	GF	GA
(China) 1985	Did not qualify							
(Canada) 1987	Did not qualify							
(Scotland) 1989	Did not qualify							
(Italy) 1991	Did not qualify							
(Japan) 1993	Did not qualify							
(Ecuador) 1995	Did not qualify							
(Egypt) 1997	Did not qualify							
(New Zealand) 1999	Did not qualify							
(Trinidad and Tobago) 2001	Did not qualify							
(Finland) 2003	Did not qualify							
(Peru) 2005	Third place	3rd	6	4	0	2	12	10
(South Korea) 2007	Did not qualify							
(Nigeria) 2009	Group stage	13th	3	1	0	2	3	4
(Mexico) 2011	Group stage	20th	3	0	1	2	3	5
(United Arab Emirates) 2013	Did not qualify							
(Chile) 2015	Did not qualify							
(India) 2017	Did not qualify							
(Brazil) 2019	Fourth place	4th	7	3	1	3	14	12
(Peru) 2021	Cancelled due to COVID-19 pandemic							
(Indonesia) 2023	Did not qualify							
(Qatar) 2025	Did not qualify							
(Qatar) 2026	Did not qualify							
(Qatar) 2027	To be determined							
(Qatar) 2028	To be determined							
(Qatar) 2029	To be determined							
Total	4/20	3rd	19	8	2	9	32	31

=== UEFA European Under-17 Championship record ===
Year	Round	Pld	W	D*	L	GF	GA
(Denmark) 2002	Group stage	3	1	1	1	10	7
(Portugal) 2003	did not qualify						
(France) 2004	did not qualify						
(Italy) 2005	Runners-up	5	2	2	1	5	5
(Luxembourg) 2006	did not qualify						
(Belgium) 2007	Quarter-finals	4	1	1	2	9	9
(Turkey) 2008	Semi-finals	4	2	0	2	4	5
(Germany) 2009	Runners-up	5	2	1	2	6	7
(Liechtenstein) 2010	did not qualify						
(Serbia) 2011	Champions	5	4	1	0	9	2
(Slovenia) 2012	Champions	5	3	2	0	6	2
(Slovakia) 2013	did not qualify						
(Malta) 2014	Runners-up	5	4	0	1	16	5
(Bulgaria) 2015	Group stage	3	0	3	0	2	2
(Azerbaijan) 2016	Semi-finals	5	3	0	2	4	4
(Croatia) 2017	Quarter-finals	4	1	1	2	4	7
(England) 2018	Champions	6	3	3	0	10	3
(Republic of Ireland) 2019	Champions	6	5	0	1	15	6
(Estonia) 2020	Cancelled due to COVID-19 pandemic						
(Cyprus) 2021	Cancelled due to COVID-19 pandemic						
(Israel) 2022	Runners-up	6	4	1	1	13	7
(Hungary) 2023	Group stage	3	0	1	2	2	7
(Cyprus) 2024	did not qualify						
(Albania) 2025	did not qualify						
(Estonia) 2026	did not qualify						
(Latvia) 2027	did not qualify						
(Lithuania) 2028	To be determined						
(Moldova) 2029	To be determined						
Total	15/23	69	35	17	17	115	78

*Draws include knockout matches decided on penalty kicks.
**Gold background colour indicates that the tournament was won.
***Red border colour indicates tournament was held on home soil.

== Honours ==
- FIFA U-17 World Cup

- Third place: 2005

- UEFA European Under-17 Championship

- First place: 2011, 2012, 2018, 2019
- Second place: 2005, 2009, 2014, 2022
- Third place: 2000

== Players ==
=== Current squad ===
The following players were called up for the most recent 2026 UEFA European Under-17 Championship qualification matches.

No.	Pos.	Player	Date of birth (age)	Club
1	GK	Quenten Attigah	5 April 2009 (age 17)	(Royal Dutch Football Association) AZ
16	GK	Thomas Hulleman	25 December 2009 (age 16)	(Royal Dutch Football Association) Go Ahead Eagles
2	DF	Teun Bens	11 April 2009 (age 17)	(Royal Dutch Football Association) PSV
5	DF	Driss Laaouina	8 April 2009 (age 17)	(Royal Dutch Football Association) Utrecht
4	DF	Tije Vos	4 May 2009 (age 17)	(Royal Dutch Football Association) PSV
13	DF	Boaz Plantinga	7 January 2009 (age 17)	(Royal Dutch Football Association) Feyenoord
14	DF	Kas Hendrix	29 January 2009 (age 17)	(German Football Association) Borussia Mönchengladbach
8	MF	Jadiel Pereira da Gama	15 December 2009 (age 16)	(Royal Dutch Football Association) PEC Zwolle
10	MF	Mohamed Abdalla	19 October 2009 (age 17)	(Royal Dutch Football Association) Ajax
3	MF	Kevin Bizoza	8 January 2009 (age 17)	(Royal Dutch Football Association) PSV
16	MF	Tim de Koning (captain)	17 June 2009 (age 17)	(Royal Dutch Football Association) Feyenoord
12	MF	Dinaylo Furtado Brito	12 August 2009 (age 17)	(German Football Association) Wolfsburg
9	MF	Kelson Puati	17 September 2009 (age 17)	(Royal Dutch Football Association) Feyenoord
11	FW	Jivayno Zinhagel	18 April 2009 (age 17)	(Royal Dutch Football Association) Feyenoord
17	FW	Luca Nas	6 February 2009 (age 17)	(Royal Dutch Football Association) Ajax
20	FW	Gian-Luca Aserie	8 March 2009 (age 17)	(Royal Dutch Football Association) Feyenoord
7	FW	Jerayno Schaken	18 June 2009 (age 17)	(Royal Dutch Football Association) Feyenoord
19	FW	Donny van der Lijcke	13 February 2009 (age 17)	(Royal Dutch Football Association) AZ

=== Recent call-ups ===
The following players have also been called up within the last twelve months and are still eligible for selection:

Pos.	Player	Date of birth (age)	Caps	Goals	Club	Latest call-up

== See also ==
- Netherlands (senior) team
- Netherlands national under-21 football team
- Netherlands national under-19 football team
- Netherlands women's national football team
