= Oliver Schnitzler =

German footballer

Personal information
- Date of birth: 13 October 1995 (age 31)
- Place of birth: Gummersbach, Germany
- Height: 1.90 m (6 ft 3 in)
- Position: Goalkeeper

Team information
- Current team: SV Rahrbachtal

Youth career
- SV Frömmersbach
- –2009: SSV Bergneustadt
- 2009–2014: Bayer Leverkusen

Senior career*
Years	Team	Apps	(Gls)
2013	Bayer Leverkusen II	1	(0)
2014–2016	VfR Aalen	5	(0)
2014–2015	VfR Aalen II	10	(0)
2016–2017	1. FC Heidenheim	1	(0)
2017–2018	Hallescher FC	22	(0)
2018–2020	Preußen Münster	11	(0)
2020–2021	Sonnenhof Großaspach	6	(0)
2021–2022	Sportfreunde Siegen	11	(0)
2022–	SV Rahrbachtal		

International career
2011	Germany U-16	5	(0)
2011–2012	Germany U-17	16	(0)
2013	Germany U-18	1	(0)
2013–2014	Germany U-19	10	(0)
2014	Germany U-20	1	(0)
- * Club domestic league appearances and goals as of 4 June 2022

Oliver Schnitzler (born 13 October 1995) is a German footballer who plays as a goalkeeper for SV Rahrbachtal.
