= Marian Sarr =

German footballer (born 1995)

Personal information
- Date of birth: 30 January 1995 (age 31)
- Place of birth: Essen, Germany
- Height: 1.89 m (6 ft 2 1/2 in)
- Position: Centre back

Team information
- Current team: SC Weiche
- Number: 23

Youth career
- 1999–2003: Eintracht Leithe
- 2003–2005: Schwarz-Weiß Essen
- 2005–2008: Schalke 04
- 2008–2012: Bayer Leverkusen
- 2013: Borussia Dortmund

Senior career*
Years	Team	Apps	(Gls)
2012	Bayer Leverkusen II	10	(0)
2013–2016	Borussia Dortmund II	36	(1)
2013–2016	Borussia Dortmund	2	(0)
2016–2018	VfL Wolfsburg II	38	(1)
2018–2019	VfR Aalen	13	(1)
2019–2020	Carl Zeiss Jena	5	(0)
2019–2020	Carl Zeiss Jena II	3	(0)
2021	Bonner SC	20	(2)
2021–2022	FC Gießen	27	(0)
2022–2024	UT Pétange	54	(4)
2024–	SC Weiche	8	(0)

International career^{‡}
2010	Germany U15	2	(0)
2010–2011	Germany U16	5	(0)
2011–2012	Germany U17	17	(2)
2013	Germany U18	2	(0)
2013–2014	Germany U19	7	(0)
2014	Germany U20	1	(0)
Medal record
Germany
Runner-up	UEFA Under-17 Championship	2012
- * Club domestic league appearances and goals as of 20 June 2026 ‡ National team caps and goals as of 28 March 2023

Marian Sarr (German pronunciation: [ˈmaːʁi̯an ˈzaʁ]; born 30 January 1995) is a German professional footballer who plays as a centre back for Regionalliga Nord club SC Weiche Flensburg. He is the older brother of Wilfried Sarr.

== Club career ==
=== Early career ===
Sarr began his club career playing at Schwarz-Weiß Essen then moved to Schalke 04 in the 2005–06 season before moving to Bayer Leverkusen in the 2008–09 season, where he ultimately succeeded to the second team. In the 2012–13 Regionalliga season, Sarr made ten appearances for Bayer Leverkusen second team as a defender during the first half of the 2012–13 season.

=== Borussia Dortmund ===
Sarr signed for Borussia Dortmund in the dawn of the 2012–13 Bundesliga season. The signing of Sarr by Borussia Dortmund from Bayer Leverkusen attracted the attention of the media, leading to a renewed debate about "talent theft" in football. During the second half of the 2012–13 season, Sarr was enrolled initially in the Borussia Dortmund academy (U-19). In the 2013–14 Bundesliga season, Sarr was inducted into the Borussia Dortmund first team by Jürgen Klopp.

Sarr debuted for Borussia Dortmund II on 20 July 2013 on matchday 1 of the 2013–14 season in the 3. Liga against VfB Stuttgart II, in which Sarr made his professional debut.

Sarr made his Borussia Dortmund and UEFA Champions League debut on 11 December 2013 against Olympique de Marseille, helping his team win 2–1 and secure a spot in the round of 16 and win their group.

The defender had the first match in the Bundesliga on 14 December 2013 against TSG 1899 Hoffenheim.

On 11 June 2019, FC Carl Zeiss Jena announced that they had signed Sarr on a 2-year contract.

On 4 November 2024, Sarr Joined Regionalliga Nord side Weiche Flensburg.

== International career ==
Sarr represented the German U17 national football team that participated in the 2012 UEFA European Under-17 Football Championship in Slovenia. The German U17 national football team under coach Stefan Böger won all matches of the preliminary round, and won the semi-final against Poland U17 national football team 1–0, then conceded defeat in the final against the Netherlands U17 national football team in a 5–4 penalty shootout. He is also eligible for the Gambia national football team as his father Famara hails from Bakau.

== Career statistics ==
=== Club ===
As of match played 29 August 2015

Club	Season	League			Cup^{1}		Other^{2}		Continental^{3}		Total	
Club	Season	Division	Apps	Goals	Apps	Goals	Apps	Goals	Apps	Goals	Apps	Goals
Bayer Leverkusen II	2012–13	Regionalliga West	10	0	0	0	0	0	—		10	0
Borussia Dortmund II	2013–14	3. Liga	25	1	0	0	0	0	—		25	1
Borussia Dortmund II	2014–15	3. Liga	6	0	0	0	0	0	—		6	0
Borussia Dortmund II	2015–16	Regionalliga West	5	0	0	0	0	0	—		5	0
Borussia Dortmund II	Total		36	1	0	0	0	0	0	0	36	1
Borussia Dortmund	2013–14	Bundesliga	2	0	0	0	0	0	1	0	3	0
Career total			48	1	0	0	0	0	1	0	49	1

^1 Includes DFB-Pokal.
^2 Includes DFL-Supercup.
^3 Includes UEFA Champions League and UEFA Europa League.

== Honours ==
Germany U17

- UEFA European Under-17 Football Championship runners-up: 2012
