= 2013–14 FC Schalke 04 season =

Schalke 04
2013–14 season
- President: Clemens Tönnies
- Head coach: Jens Keller
- Stadium: Veltins-Arena, Gelsenkirchen, NRW
- Bundesliga: 3rd
- DFB-Pokal: Third round
- UEFA Champions League: Round of 16
- Top goalscorer: League: Klaas-Jan Huntelaar (12); All: Klaas-Jan Huntelaar (14)
Home colours	Away colours	Third colours

The 2013–14 FC Schalke 04 season was the 110th season in the club's football history. In 2013–14 the club plays in the Bundesliga, the top tier of German football. It is the club's 22nd consecutive season in the Bundesliga, having been promoted from the 2. Bundesliga in 1991.

== Review and events ==
=== June – August ===
Ibrahim Afellay, Raffael and Christoph Moritz left the club. Christoph Metzelder retired from football.

== Fixtures and results ==
=== Legend ===
Win Draw Loss Postponed

=== Friendly matches ===
Date	Kickoff^{1}	Stadium	City	Opponent	Result^{2}	Attendance	Goalscorers and carded players		Source
Date	Kickoff^{1}	Stadium	City	Opponent	Result^{2}	Attendance	Schalke 04	Opponent	Source
Pre-season friendlies
28 June 2013	19:00	Volksbank-Arena	Kleve	ERGO Nationalelf	1–0	4.000	Huntelaar 18'	—	
4 July 2013	18:30	emp-papst-Stadion	Villingen	FC 08 Villingen	5–0	3.500	Huntelaar 7'; Höger 35'; Goretzka 62'; Bastos 79'; Szalai 86'	—	
11 July 2013	19:30	Red Bull Arena	Salzburg, Austria	Red Bull Salzburg	1–3	17.500	Draxler 33'	Mané 16'; Soriano 51'; Hinteregger 77'	
14 July 2013	19:00	New Tivoli	Aachen	Alemannia Aachen	6–1	6,679	Szalai 2'; Pukki 25', 32'; Huntelaar 51'; Clemens 52'; Draxler 76'	Mazan Moslehe 87'	
17 July 2013	19:00	Stadion Oberwerth	Koblenz	TuS Koblenz	4–1	6,941	Szalai 8', 13'; Höwedes 20'; Pukki 66'	Kevin Lahn 59'	
21 July 2013	18:00	Stadion Lind/Villach	Villach, Austria	Beşiktaş	1–1	4.000	Draxler 56'	Franco 64'	
24 July 2013	18:00	Stadion Lind/Villach	Villach	Southampton	2–0	3.000	Huntelaar 58'; Matip 69'	—	
27 July 2013	17:30	Veltins-Arena	Gelsenkirchen	Al Sadd SC	9–0	61.973	Farfán 3' (pen.), 31'; Szalai 8', 25'; Huntelaar 56', 59'; Goretzka 58'; *Raúl 65', 70' (pen.)	—	
29 July 2013	17:30	Bruno-Plache-Stadion	Leipzig	1. FC Lok Leipzig	2–1	5.500	Szalai 4', 45'	Steve Rolleder 41' (pen.)	
Mid-season-break friendlies
6 January 2014	14:15	Thani bin Jassim Stadium	Doha	Al-Gharafa SC	2–1	150	Szalai 49', 57'	Nenê 26'	
11 January 2014	13:00	Al Nahyan Stadium	Abu Dhabi	Eintracht Frankfurt	3–2	500	Farfán 44', 65'; Boateng 56'	Rosenthal 18'; Joselu 46'	
18 January 2014	15:30	RheinEnergieStadion	Cologne	1. FC Köln	1–2	19,467	Farfán 43'	Ujah 18'; Bröker 46'	
19 January 2014	14:00	Niederrheinstadion	Oberhausen	Rot-Weiß Oberhausen	0–1	4,612	—	Jansen 50'	

- Raúl played his Farewell game for Schalke 04. He played the first half by Al Sadd SC and the second by Schalke 04.

=== Bundesliga ===
==== League fixtures and results ====
Matchday	Date	Kickoff^{1}	Stadium	City	Opponent	Result^{2}	Attendance	Goalscorers		Table		Source
Matchday	Date	Kickoff^{1}	Stadium	City	Opponent	Result^{2}	Attendance	Schalke 04	Opponent	Pos.	Pts	Source
1	11 August 2013	17:30	Veltins-Arena	Gelsenkirchen	Hamburger SV	3–3	61,973	Huntelaar 2', 45'; Szalai 72'	Van der Vaart 12' (pen.); Beister 24'; Sobiech 49'	8	1	
2	17 August 2013	15:30	Volkswagen Arena	Wolfsburg	VfL Wolfsburg	0–4	28,405	—	Knoche 55'; Vieirinha 61'; Naldo 67'; Kutschke 90'	13	1	
3	24 August 2013	15:30	AWD-Arena	Hanover	Hannover 96	1–2	49,000	Szalai 55'	Huszti 15'; Diouf 42'	15	1	
4	31 August 2013	18:30	Veltins-Arena	Gelsenkirchen	Bayer Leverkusen	2–0	61,000	Höger 30'; Farfán 83' (pen.)	—	13	4	
5	14 September 2013	15:30	Coface Arena	Mainz	Mainz 05	1–0	34,000	Boateng 34'	—	9	7	
6	21 September 2013	18:30	Veltins-Arena	Gelsenkirchen	Bayern Munich	0–4	61,973	—	Schweinsteiger 21'; Mandžukić 22'; Ribéry 75'; Pizarro 84'	14	7	
7	28 September 2013	15:30	Rhein-Neckar Arena	Sinsheim	1899 Hoffenheim	3–3	29,139	Boateng 3'; Matip 13'; Höger 40'	Modeste 16'; Firmino 48' (pen.); Abraham 61'	14	8	
8	5 October 2013	15:30	Veltins-Arena	Gelsenkirchen	FC Augsburg	4–1	60,731	Boateng 16' (pen.); Szalai 28'; Szalai 78'; Meyer 86'	Mölders 10'	8	11	
9	19 October 2013	15:30	Eintracht-Stadion	Braunschweig	Eintracht Braunschweig	3–2	23,251	Meyer 29'; Goretzka 65'; Neustädter 90'	Ademi 20'; Bellarabi 59'	5	14	
10	26 October 2013	15:30	Veltins-Arena	Gelsenkirchen	Borussia Dortmund	1–3	61,973	Meyer 62'	Aubameyang 14'; Şahin 51'; Błaszczykowski 74'	7	14	
11	2 November 2013	15:30	Olympic Stadium	Berlin	Hertha BSC	2–0	69,277	Szalai 26'; Draxler 90'	—	6	17	
12	9 November 2013	15:30	Veltins-Arena	Gelsenkirchen	Werder Bremen	3–1	61,973	Boateng 64', 85'; Farfán 90'	Kroos 22'	6	20	
13	23 November 2013	15:30	Commerzbank-Arena	Frankfurt	Eintracht Frankfurt	3–3	51,500	Flum 14' (o.g.); Matip 18'; Höwedes 86'	Flum 56'; Joselu 61', 68'	6	21	
14	30 November 2013	18:30	Veltins-Arena	Gelsenkirchen	VfB Stuttgart	3–0	61,973	Farfán 34', 47' (pen.); Jones 79'	—	5	24	
15	7 December 2013	15:30	Borussia-Park	Mönchengladbach	Borussia Mönchengladbach	1–2	54,010	Farfán 17' (pen.)	Raffael 24'; Kruse 45' (pen.)	6	24	
16	15 December 2013	15:30	Veltins-Arena	Gelsenkirchen	SC Freiburg	2–0	60,661	Höfler 44' (o.g.); Farfán 67' (pen.)	—	6	27	
17	21 December 2013	18:30	Grundig-Stadion	Nuremberg	1. FC Nürnberg	0–0	42,687	—	—	7	28	
18	26 January 2014	17:30	Imtech Arena	Hamburg	Hamburger SV	3–0	49,457	Huntelaar 34'; Farfán 53'; Meyer 56'	—	5	31	
19	1 February 2014	15:30	Veltins-Arena	Gelsenkirchen	VfL Wolfsburg	2–1	61,142	Santana 9'; Boateng 81'	Arnold 65'	4	34	
20	9 February 2014	17:30	Veltins-Arena	Gelsenkirchen	Hannover 96	2–0	61,307	Farfán 39'; Meyer 44'	—	4	37	
21	15 February 2014	18:30	BayArena	Leverkusen	Bayer Leverkusen	2–1	30,210	Goretzka 28'; Huntelaar 74'	Santana 66' (o.g.)	4	40	
22	21 February 2014	20:30	Veltins-Arena	Gelsenkirchen	Mainz 05	0–0	60,952	—	—	4	41	
23	1 March 2014	18:30	Allianz Arena	Munich	Bayern Munich	1–5	71,000	Rafinha 64' (o.g.)	Alaba 3'; Robben 15', 28', 77' (pen.); Mandžukić 24'	4	41	
24	8 March 2014	15:30	Veltins-Arena	Gelsenkirchen	TSG 1899 Hoffenheim	4–0	60,604	Huntelaar 6', 28', 79'; Obasi 55'	—	4	44	
25	14 March 2014	20:30	SGL arena	Augsburg	FC Augsburg	2–1	30,660	Huntelaar 33', 49'	Werner 5'	3	47	
26	22 March 2014	15:30	Veltins-Arena	Gelsenkirchen	Eintracht Braunschweig	3–1	61,973	Goretzka 17'; Huntelaar 65'; Szalai 90'	Kessel 82'	3	50	
27	25 March 2014	20:00	Signal Iduna Park	Dortmund	Borussia Dortmund	0–0	77,600	—	—	3	51	
28	28 March 2014	20:30	Veltins-Arena	Gelsenkirchen	Hertha BSC	2–0	61,550	Obasi 16'; Huntelaar 46'	—	3	54	
29	5 April 2014	15:30	Weserstadion	Bremen	Werder Bremen	1–1	42,100	Goretzka 33'	Di Santo 15'	3	55	
30	11 April 2014	20:30	Veltins-Arena	Gelsenkirchen	Eintracht Frankfurt	2–0	61,973	Meyer 59'; Farfán 90'	—	3	58	
31	20 April 2014	17:30	Mercedes-Benz Arena	Stuttgart	VfB Stuttgart	1–3	60,000	Szalai 69'	Harnik 23', 59'; Cacau 54'	3	58	
32	27 April 2014	17:30	Veltins-Arena	Gelsenkirchen	Borussia Mönchengladbach	0–1	61,973	—	Herrmann 35'	3	58	
33	3 May 2014	15:30	Mage Solar Stadion	Freiburg	SC Freiburg	2–0	24,000	Ayhan 13'; Huntelaar 65'	—	3	61	
34	10 May 2014	15:30	Veltins-Arena	Gelsenkirchen	1. FC Nürnberg	4–1	61,973	Matip 6'; Neustädter 45'; Draxler 75'; Obasi 90'	Drmić 90'	3	64	

==== League table ====
Pos	Team	Pld	W	D	L	GF	GA	GD	Pts	Qualification or relegation
1	Bayern Munich (C)	34	29	3	2	94	23	+71	90	Qualification for the Champions League group stage
2	Borussia Dortmund	34	22	5	7	80	38	+42	71	Qualification for the Champions League group stage
3	Schalke 04	34	19	7	8	63	43	+20	64	Qualification for the Champions League group stage
4	Bayer Leverkusen	34	19	4	11	60	41	+19	61	Qualification for the Champions League play-off round
5	VfL Wolfsburg	34	18	6	10	63	50	+13	60	Qualification for the Europa League group stage (Note: The 2013–14 DFB-Pokal finalists (Borussia Dortmund and Bayern Munich) qualified for the UEFA Champions League, thus the three Europa League places were distributed through league positions.)

Source: DFB
Rules for classification: 1) points; 2) goal difference; 3) number of goals scored.
(C) Champions

==== Results summary ====
Overall								Home						Away					
Pld	W	D	L	GF	GA	GD	Pts	W	D	L	GF	GA	GD	W	D	L	GF	GA	GD
34	19	7	8	63	43	+20	64	12	2	3	37	16	+21	7	5	5	26	27	−1

Last updated: 10 May 2014.

=== DFB–Pokal ===
Round	Date	Kickoff^{1}	Stadium	City	Opponent	Result^{2}	Attendance	Goalscorers		Source
Round	Date	Kickoff^{1}	Stadium	City	Opponent	Result^{2}	Attendance	Schalke 04	Opponent	Source
FR	5 August 2013	18:30	Wildparkstadion	Karlsruhe	FC Nöttingen	2–0	12.470	Huntelaar 30'; Goretzka 90'	—	
SR	25 September 2013	20:30	Stadion am Böllenfalltor	Darmstadt	Darmstadt 98	3–1	17,000	Farfán 35' (pen.); Höwedes 58'; Meyer 86'	Behrens 36'	
TR	3 December 2013	20:30	Veltins-Arena	Gelsenkirchen	1899 Hoffenheim	1–3	51,078	Farfán 67'	Herdling 21'; Volland 32'; Firmino 35'	

=== UEFA Champions League ===
==== Play–off round ====
Leg	Date	Kickoff^{1}	Stadium	City	Opponent	Result^{2}	Agg. score^{2}	Attendance	Goalscorers		Source
Leg	Date	Kickoff^{1}	Stadium	City	Opponent	Result^{2}	Agg. score^{2}	Attendance	Schalke 04	Opponent	Source
Play–off round
1	21 August 2013	20:45	Veltins-Arena	Gelsenkirchen	PAOK	1–1	—	52,444	Farfán 32'	Stoch 73'	
2	27 August 2013	20:45	Toumba Stadium	Thessaloniki	PAOK	3–2	4–3	410	Szalai 43', 90'; Draxler 67'	Athanasiadis 53'; Katsouranis 79'	

==== Group stage ====
Pos	Team	Pld	W	D	L	GF	GA	GD	Pts	Qualification	CHE	SCH	BSL	STE
1	(England) Chelsea	6	4	0	2	12	3	+9	12	Advance to knockout phase	—	3–0	1–2	1–0
2	(Germany) Schalke 04	6	3	1	2	6	6	0	10	Advance to knockout phase	0–3	—	2–0	3–0
3	(Switzerland) Basel	6	2	2	2	5	6	−1	8	Transfer to Europa League	1–0	0–1	—	1–1
4	(Romania) Steaua București	6	0	3	3	2	10	−8	3		0–4	0–0	1–1	—

Source: UEFA

Matchday	Date	Kickoff^{1}	Stadium	City	Opponent	Result^{2}	Attendance	Goalscorers		Table		Source
Matchday	Date	Kickoff^{1}	Stadium	City	Opponent	Result^{2}	Attendance	Schalke 04	Opponent	Pos.	Pts	Source
1	18 September 2013	20:45	Veltins-Arena	Gelsenkirchen	Steaua București	3–0	49,358	Uchida 67'; Boateng 78'; Draxler 85'	—	1	3	
2	1 October 2013	20:45	St. Jakob-Park	Basel	Basel	1–0	33,251	Draxler 54'	—	1	6	
3	22 October 2013	20:45	Veltins-Arena	Gelsenkirchen	Chelsea	0–3	54,442	—	Torres 5', 69'; Hazard 87'	2	6	
4	6 November 2013	20:45	Stamford Bridge	London	Chelsea	0–3	41,194	—	Eto'o 31', 54'; Ba 83'	2	6	
5	26 November 2013	20:45	Arena Națională	Bucharest	Steaua București	0–0	20,000	—	—	3	7	
6	11 December 2013	20:45	Veltins-Arena	Gelsenkirchen	Basel	2–0	52,093	Draxler 51'; Matip 57'	—	2	10	

==== Round of 16 ====
Leg	Date	Kickoff^{1}	Stadium	City	Opponent	Result^{2}	Agg. score^{2}	Attendance	Goalscorers		Source
Leg	Date	Kickoff^{1}	Stadium	City	Opponent	Result^{2}	Agg. score^{2}	Attendance	Schalke 04	Opponent	Source
Round of 16
1	26 February 2014	20:45	Veltins-Arena	Gelsenkirchen	Real Madrid	1–6	—	54,442	Huntelaar 90'	Benzema 13', 57'; Bale 21', 69'; Ronaldo 52', 89'	
2	18 March 2014	20:45	Santiago Bernabéu	Madrid	Real Madrid	1–3	2–9	65,148	Hoogland 31'	Ronaldo 21', 73'; Morata 75'	

== Team statistics ==
Competition	First match	Last match	Starting round	Final position	Record								Sources
Competition	First match	Last match	Starting round	Final position	G	W	D	L	GF	GA	GD	Win %	Sources
Bundesliga	9 August 2013	10 May 2014	Matchday 1	3rd Place	34	19	7	8	63	43	+20	55.88	
DFB-Pokal	5 August 2013	3 December 2013	Round 1	Round 3	3	2	0	1	6	4	+2	66.67	
Champions League	18 September 2013	18 March 2014	Play–off round	Round of 16	10	4	2	4	12	18	−6	40.00	
Total					47	25	9	13	81	65	+16	53.19	—
Updated: 10 May 2014

== Player information ==
=== Squad ===
Squad Season 2013–14
No.	Player	Nat.	Age	Birthplace	Previous club
Goalkeepers
1	Ralf Fährmann	Germany	38	Karl-Marx-Stadt	Eintracht Frankfurt
34	Timo Hildebrand	Germany	47	Worms	Sporting CP
Defenders
2	Tim Hoogland	Germany	41	Marl	VfB Stuttgart
4	Benedikt Höwedes (C)	Germany	38	Haltern	Schalke 04 Youth system
5	Felipe Santana	Brazil	40	Rio Claro, São Paulo	Borussia Dortmund
6	Sead Kolašinac	Bosnia and Herzegovina	33	Karlsruhe	Schalke 04 Youth system
14	Kyriakos Papadopoulos	Greece	34	Katerini	Olympiacos
22	Atsuto Uchida	Japan	38	Kannami, Shizuoka	Kashima Antlers
23	Christian Fuchs	Austria	40	Neunkirchen	Mainz 05
24	Kaan Ayhan	Turkey	31	Gelsenkirchen	Schalke 04 Youth system
32	Joël Matip	Cameroon	35	Bochum	Schalke 04 Youth system
Midfielders
3	Jan Kirchhoff	Germany	36	Frankfurt	Bayern Munich
7	Max Meyer	Germany	31	Oberhausen	Schalke 04 Youth system
8	Leon Goretzka	Germany	31	Bochum	VfL Bochum
9	Kevin-Prince Boateng	Ghana	39	Berlin	Milan
10	Julian Draxler	Germany	33	Gladbeck	Schalke 04 Youth system
11	Christian Clemens	Germany	35	Cologne	1. FC Köln
12	Marco Höger	Germany	37	Cologne	Alemannia Aachen
15	Dennis Aogo	Germany	39	Karlsruhe	Hamburger SV
17	Jefferson Farfán	Peru	41	Lima	PSV
30	René Klingenburg	Germany	32	Oberhausen	Schalke 04 Youth system
33	Roman Neustädter	Russia	38	Dnipropetrovsk	Borussia Mönchengladbach
40	Anthony Annan	Ghana	40	Accra	Osasuna
Forwards
19	Chinedu Obasi	Nigeria	40	Enugu	1899 Hoffenheim
25	Klaas-Jan Huntelaar	Netherlands	43	Voor-Drempt	Milan
28	Ádám Szalai	Hungary	38	Budapest	Mainz 05
Last updated: 30 January 2014

=== Squad statistics ===
==== Appearances and goals ====
Player	Total		Bundesliga		DFB-Pokal		Champions League	
Player	App	Gls	App	Gls	App	Gls	App	Gls
Goalkeepers
Ralf Fährmann	27 (0)	0	22 (0)	0	1 (0)	0	4 (0)	0
Timo Hildebrand	20 (0)	0	12 (0)	0	2 (0)	0	6 (0)	0
Lars Unnerstall	0 (0)	0	0 (0)	0	0 (0)	0	0 (0)	0
Defenders
Tim Hoogland	16 (6)	1	15 (4)	0	0 (1)	0	1 (1)	1
Benedikt Höwedes	31 (1)	2	18 (1)	1	3 (0)	1	10 (0)	0
Felipe Santana	18 (8)	1	13 (7)	1	0 (1)	0	5 (0)	0
Sead Kolašinac	24 (6)	0	21 (3)	0	0 (0)	0	3 (3)	0
Kyriakos Papadopoulos	1 (4)	0	1 (3)	0	0 (0)	0	0 (1)	0
Atsuto Uchida	26 (1)	1	17 (0)	0	1 (1)	0	8 (0)	1
Christian Fuchs	15 (10)	0	9 (7)	0	2 (0)	0	4 (3)	0
Kaan Ayhan	10 (5)	1	9 (5)	1	0 (0)	0	1 (0)	0
Philipp Max	0 (2)	0	0 (2)	0	0 (0)	0	0 (0)	0
Joël Matip	41 (1)	4	31 (0)	3	3 (0)	0	7 (1)	1
Midfielders
Jan Kirchhoff	0 (2)	0	0 (2)	0	0 (0)	0	0 (0)	0
Max Meyer	29 (12)	7	21 (9)	6	1 (1)	1	7 (2)	0
Leon Goretzka	15 (17)	5	15 (10)	4	0 (2)	1	0 (5)	0
Kevin-Prince Boateng	35 (0)	7	28 (0)	6	1 (0)	0	6 (0)	1
Julian Draxler	36 (2)	6	25 (1)	2	2 (0)	0	9 (1)	4
Christian Clemens	10 (8)	0	6 (5)	0	2 (0)	0	2 (3)	0
Marco Höger	12 (2)	2	6 (2)	2	2 (0)	0	4 (0)	0
Leroy Sané	0 (1)	0	0 (1)	0	0 (0)	0	0 (0)	0
Jermaine Jones	17 (5)	1	9 (5)	1	3 (0)	0	5 (0)	0
Dennis Aogo	16 (0)	0	10 (0)	0	1 (0)	0	5 (0)	0
Jefferson Farfán	27 (1)	12	18 (1)	9	2 (0)	2	7 (0)	1
Tranquillo Barnetta	0 (2)	0	0 (1)	0	0 (1)	0	0 (0)	0
René Klingenburg	0 (0)	0	0 (0)	0	0 (0)	0	0 (0)	0
Roman Neustädter	42 (2)	2	31 (1)	2	3 (0)	0	8 (1)	0
Anthony Annan	0 (4)	0	0 (3)	0	0 (0)	0	0 (1)	0
Forwards
Gerald Asamoah	0 (1)	0	0 (0)	0	0 (1)	0	0 (0)	0
Chinedu Obasi	8 (11)	3	7 (8)	3	0 (1)	0	1 (2)	0
Teemu Pukki	0 (2)	0	0 (1)	0	0 (0)	0	0 (1)	0
Klaas-Jan Huntelaar	20 (1)	14	17 (1)	12	1 (0)	1	2 (0)	1
Ádám Szalai	22 (18)	9	14 (14)	7	3 (0)	0	5 (4)	2
Appearances = Total appearances (Substitute appearances)
Last updated: 10 May 2014

- Gerald Asamoah has no professional contract, he usually play at FC Schalke 04 II.
- Philipp Max has no professional contract, he usually play at FC Schalke 04 II.
- Leroy Sané has no professional contract, he usually play at FC Schalke 04 Youth system.

==== Minutes played ====
Player	Total	Bundesliga	DFB-Pokal	UCL
Ralf Fährmann	2430	1890	90	360
Tim Hoogland	1491	1352	44	95
Jan Kirchhoff	33	33	0	0
Benedikt Höwedes	2589	1510	270	809
Felipe Santana	1679	1226	3	450
Sead Kolašinac	2154	1853	0	301
Max Meyer	2557	1828	134	605
Leon Goretzka	1567	1485	21	59
Kevin-Prince Boateng	3018	2452	90	476
Julian Draxler	3102	2190	174	775
Christian Clemens	884	506	177	201
Marco Höger	1041	542	153	346
Leroy Sané	13	13	0	0
Jermaine Jones	1570	895	270	405
Kyriakos Papadopoulos	113	81	0	32
Dennis Aogo	1417	889	90	438
Jefferson Farfán	2256	1521	179	556
Gerald Asamoah	1	0	1	0
Chinedu Obasi	702	583	9	110
Teemu Pukki	30	27	0	3
Atsuto Uchida	2313	1521	72	720
Christian Fuchs	1398	847	180	381
Kaan Ayhan	956	875	0	81
Klaas-Jan Huntelaar	1685	1459	90	135
Tranquillo Barnetta	32	7	25	0
Ádám Szalai	2228	1388	230	610
René Klingenburg	0	0	0	0
Philipp Max	3	3	0	0
Joël Matip	3688	2790	261	637
Roman Neustädter	3559	2593	225	740
Timo Hildebrand	1800	1080	180	540
Lars Unnerstall	0	0	0	0
Anthony Annan	38	29	0	9
Last updated: 10 May 2014

- Gerald Asamoah has no professional contract, he usually play at FC Schalke 04 II.
- Philipp Max has no professional contract, he usually play at FC Schalke 04 II.
- Leroy Sané has no professional contract, he usually play at FC Schalke 04 Youth system.

=== Discipline ===
==== Bookings ====
No.	Player	Total			Bundesliga			DFB-Pokal			Champions League		
No.	Player	Yellow card	(yellow card) (red card)	Red card	Yellow card	(yellow card) (red card)	Red card	Yellow card	(yellow card) (red card)	Red card	Yellow card	(yellow card) (red card)	Red card
1	Ralf Fährmann	0	0	0	0	0	0	0	0	0	0	0	0
2	Tim Hoogland	2	0	0	2	0	0	0	0	0	0	0	0
3	Jan Kirchhoff	0	0	0	0	0	0	0	0	0	0	0	0
4	Benedikt Höwedes	3	1	1	0	1	1	1	0	0	2	0	0
5	Felipe Santana	1	1	0	0	1	0	0	0	0	1	0	0
6	Sead Kolašinac	6	0	0	5	0	0	0	0	0	1	0	0
7	Max Meyer	3	0	0	3	0	0	0	0	0	0	0	0
8	Leon Goretzka	1	0	0	1	0	0	0	0	0	0	0	0
9	Kevin-Prince Boateng	6	0	0	6	0	0	0	0	0	0	0	0
10	Julian Draxler	8	0	0	5	0	0	2	0	0	1	0	0
11	Christian Clemens	1	0	0	0	0	0	1	0	0	0	0	0
12	Marco Höger	2	0	0	0	0	0	0	0	0	2	0	0
13	Leroy Sané	0	0	0	0	0	0	0	0	0	0	0	0
13	Jermaine Jones	6	1	0	3	0	0	0	0	0	3	1	0
14	Kyriakos Papadopoulos	1	0	1	0	0	1	0	0	0	1	0	0
15	Dennis Aogo	3	0	0	1	0	0	1	0	0	1	0	0
17	Jefferson Farfán	3	0	0	2	0	0	0	0	0	1	0	0
18	Gerald Asamoah	0	0	0	0	0	0	0	0	0	0	0	0
19	Chinedu Obasi	1	0	0	1	0	0	0	0	0	0	0	0
20	Teemu Pukki	0	0	0	0	0	0	0	0	0	0	0	0
22	Atsuto Uchida	8	0	0	5	0	0	1	0	0	2	0	0
23	Christian Fuchs	2	1	0	1	1	0	0	0	0	1	0	0
24	Kaan Ayhan	3	0	0	3	0	0	0	0	0	0	0	0
25	Klaas-Jan Huntelaar	6	0	0	5	0	0	0	0	0	1	0	0
27	Tranquillo Barnetta	0	0	0	0	0	0	0	0	0	0	0	0
28	Ádám Szalai	4	0	0	2	0	0	2	0	0	0	0	0
30	René Klingenburg	0	0	0	0	0	0	0	0	0	0	0	0
31	Philipp Max	0	0	0	0	0	0	0	0	0	0	0	0
32	Joël Matip	5	0	0	4	0	0	0	0	0	1	0	0
33	Roman Neustädter	6	0	0	4	0	0	0	0	0	2	0	0
34	Timo Hildebrand	0	0	0	0	0	0	0	0	0	0	0	0
36	Lars Unnerstall	0	0	0	0	0	0	0	0	0	0	0	0
40	Anthony Annan	0	0	0	0	0	0	0	0	0	0	0	0
Totals		78	4	2	50	3	2	8	0	0	20	1	0
Last updated: 4 May 2014

- Gerald Asamoah has no professional contract, he usually play at Schalke 04 II.
- Philipp Max has no professional contract, he usually play at Schalke 04 II.
- Leroy Sané has no professional contract, he usually play at Schalke 04 Youth system.

==== Suspensions ====
No.	Player	No. of matches served	Reason	Competition served in	Date served	Opponent(s)	Source
13	Jermaine Jones	1	Bad performances	UEFA Champions League	1 October 2013	Basel	

=== Transfers ===
==== In ====
No.	Pos.	Name	Age	EU	Moving from	Type	Transfer Window	Contract ends	Transfer fee	Sources
3	MF	Jan Kirchhoff	23	Yes	Bayern Munich	Loan	Winter	2015	Free	
9	MF	Kevin-Prince Boateng	26	Yes	Milan	Transfer	Summer	2016	€10,000,000	
15	DF	Dennis Aogo	26	Yes	Hamburger SV	Loan	Summer	2014	€650,000	
8	MF	Leon Goretzka	18	Yes	VfL Bochum	Transfer	Summer	2018	€2,750,000	
28	FW	Ádám Szalai	25	Yes	Mainz 05	Transfer	Summer	2017	€8,000,000	
11	MF	Christian Clemens	21	Yes	1. FC Köln	Transfer	Summer	2017	€2,800,000	
5	DF	Felipe Santana	27	No	Borussia Dortmund	Transfer	Summer	2016	€1,000,000	
24	DF	Kaan Ayhan	18	Yes	Youth system	Promoted	Summer	2015	—	
2	DF	Tim Hoogland	28	Yes	VfB Stuttgart	End of loan	Summer	2014	—	—
40	MF	Anthony Annan	26	No	Osasuna	End of loan	Summer	2014	—	—
3	DF	Sergio Escudero	23	Yes	Getafe	End of loan	Summer	2014	—	—
29	FW	Philipp Hofmann	20	Yes	SC Paderborn	End of loan	Summer	2014	—	—
—	MF	José Manuel Jurado	27	Yes	Spartak Moscow	End of loan	Summer	2014	—	—

==== Out ====
No.	Pos.	Name	Age	EU	Moving to	Type	Transfer Window	Transfer fee	Sources
13	MF	Jermaine Jones	32	Yes	Beşiktaş	Transfer	Winter	€200,000	
36	GK	Lars Unnerstall	23	Yes	Aarau	Loan	Winter	€200,000	
27	MF	Tranquillo Barnetta	28	Yes	Eintracht Frankfurt	Loan	Summer	Free	
20	FW	Teemu Pukki	23	Yes	Celtic	Transfer	Summer	€2,500,000	
9	MF	Michel Bastos	29	Yes	Lyon	End of loan	Summer	—	
29	FW	Philipp Hofmann	20	Yes	FC Ingolstadt	Loan	Summer	€200,000	
3	DF	Sergio Escudero	23	Yes	Getafe	Transfer	Summer	€500,000	
21	DF	Christoph Metzelder	32	Yes	TuS Haltern	Transfer	Summer	Free	
11	MF	Ibrahim Afellay	27	Yes	Barcelona	End of loan	Summer	—	—
18	MF	Raffael	28	No	Dynamo Kyiv	End of loan	Summer	—	—
28	MF	Christoph Moritz	23	Yes	Mainz 05	Transfer	Summer	Free	
8	FW	Ciprian Marica	27	Yes	Getafe	Transfer	Summer	Free	
—	MF	José Manuel Jurado	27	Yes	Spartak Moscow	Transfer	Summer	€3,000,000	

== Kits ==
Home	Home Alt.	Away	Away Alt.	Third

Type	Shirt	Shorts	Socks	First appearance / Info
Home	Blue	White	Blue	
Home Alt.	Blue	Blue	Blue	Bundesliga, Match 2, 17 August against Wolfsburg
Away	White	Navy	White	
Away Alt.	White	White	White	Friendly, 27 July against Al Sadd SC
Third	Green	Black	Black	→ International Kit

== Notes ==
- 1.Kickoff time in Central European Time/Central European Summer Time.
- 2.Schalke 04 goals listed first.
