= 2012–13 FC Schalke 04 season =

Schalke 04
2012–13 season
- President: Clemens Tönnies
- Head coach: Huub Stevens (until 16 December 2012); Jens Keller (from 17 December 2012)
- Stadium: Veltins-Arena, Gelsenkirchen, NRW
- Bundesliga: 4th
- DFB-Pokal: Round 3
- UEFA Champions League: Round of 16
- Top goalscorer: League: Klaas-Jan Huntelaar (10); Julian Draxler (10); All: Klaas-Jan Huntelaar (16)
Home colours	Away colours	Third colours

The 2012–13 FC Schalke 04 season was the 109th season in the club's football history. In 2012–13 the club plays in the Bundesliga, the top tier of German football. It is the clubs 22nd consecutive season in this league, having been promoted from the 2. Bundesliga in 1991.

== Review and events ==
The club also takes part in the 2012–13 edition of the DFB-Pokal, where it reached the second round and will face 2. Bundesliga side SV Sandhausen next.

In Europe the club has qualified for the 2012–13 edition of the Champions League where it will play Olympiacos, Montpellier and Arsenal in Group B of the group stage.

Huub Stevens was sacked as head coach on 16 December 2012. Jens Keller replaced Stevens as head coach.

== Competitions ==
=== Legend ===
Win Draw Loss Postponed

=== Friendly matches ===
11 July 2012 Friendly	Schalke 04	6–0	ERGO-Nationalelf	Recklinghausen
18:30	Barnetta 22'; Holtby 45'; Edu 46', 76'; Klingenburg 63'; Pukki 78'	Report		Stadium: Hohenhorst Stadium; Attendance: 2,504

Friendly	SG Sonnenhof Großaspach	2–4	Schalke 04
			Edu; Jurado; Pukki

17 July 2012 Friendly	FC 08 Villingen	–	Schalke 04
18:45

24 July 2012 Friendly	Schalke 04	0–1	(Italy) Milan
			Emanuelson 62'

Friendly	1. FC Magdeburg	0–5	Schalke 04
			Edu; Farfán; Pukki

5 August 2012 Friendly	Udinese (Italy)	0–0	Schalke 04	Klagenfurt, Austria
15:30 (UTC+02)				Stadium: Wörtherseestadion

=== Bundesliga ===
==== League results ====
Match	Date	Time	Venue	City	Opponent	Result^{1}	Attendance	Schalke 04 goalscorers	Source
1	26 August 2012	17:30	AWD-Arena	Hanover	Hannover 96	2–2	49,000	Huntelaar 52'; Holtby 64'	
2	1 September 2012	15:30	Veltins-Arena	Gelsenkirchen	FC Augsburg	3–1	60,582	Papadopoulos 33'; Jones 46'; Huntelaar 72'	
3	15 September 2012	18:30	Trolli Arena	Fürth	Greuther Fürth	2–0	18,000	Draxler 48'; Holtby 88'	
4	22 September 2012	15:30	Veltins-Arena	Gelsenkirchen	Bayern Munich	0–2	61,673	—	
5	25 September 2012	20:00	Veltins-Arena	Gelsenkirchen	Mainz 05	3–0	59,116	Farfán 21' (pen.); Holtby 81'; Pukki 89'	
6	28 September 2012	20:30	Esprit Arena	Düsseldorf	Fortuna Düsseldorf	2–2	54,600	Huntelaar 13'; Matip 20'	
7	6 October 2012	15:30	Veltins-Arena	Gelsenkirchen	VfL Wolfsburg	3–0	60,671	Farfán 33'; Afellay 46'; Neustädter 58'	
8	20 October 2012	15:30	Signal Iduna Park	Dortmund	Borussia Dortmund	2–1	80,645	Afellay 14'; Höger 48'	
9	27 October 2012	15:30	Veltins-Arena	Gelsenkirchen	1. FC Nürnberg	1–0	61,673	Farfán 77'	
10	3 November 2012	15:30	Rhein-Neckar Arena	Sinsheim	1899 Hoffenheim	2–3	30,150	Neustädter 37'; Uchida 82'	
11	10 November 2012	15:30	Veltins-Arena	Gelsenkirchen	Werder Bremen	2–1	61,673	Neustädter 59'; Draxler 69'	
12	17 November 2012	18:30	BayArena	Leverkusen	Bayer Leverkusen	0–2	29,808	—	
13	24 November 2012	15:30	Veltins-Arena	Gelsenkirchen	Eintracht Frankfurt	1–1	61,673	Huntelaar 11'	
14	27 November 2012	20:00	Imtech-Arena	Hamburg	Hamburger SV	1–3	47,127	Huntelaar 80'	
15	1 December 2012	15:30	Veltins-Arena	Gelsenkirchen	Borussia M'gladbach	1–1	61,673	Draxler 85'	
16	8 December 2012	15:30	Mercedes-Benz Arena	Stuttgart	VfB Stuttgart	1–3	55,880	Marica 12'	
17	15 December 2012	18:30	Veltins-Arena	Gelsenkirchen	SC Freiburg	1–3	60,620	Farfán 20'	
18	18 January 2013	20:30	Veltins-Arena	Gelsenkirchen	Hannover 96	5–4	60,811	Farfán 44'; Draxler 49'; Höger 64'; Marica 67'; Holtby 89'	
19	26 January 2013	15:30	SGL arena	Augsburg	FC Augsburg	0–0	28,553	—	
20	2 February 2013	15:30	Veltins-Arena	Gelsenkirchen	Greuther Fürth	1–2	60,693	Bastos 47'	
21	9 February 2013	18:30	Allianz Arena	Munich	Bayern Munich	0–4	71,000	—	
22	16 February 2013	15:30	Coface Arena	Mainz	Mainz 05	2–2	34,000	Bastos 41', 82'	
23	23 February 2013	18:30	Veltins-Arena	Gelsenkirchen	Fortuna Düsseldorf	2–1	61,673	Matip 29', 82'	
24	2 March 2013	15:30	Volkswagen Arena	Wolfsburg	VfL Wolfsburg	4–1	29,326	Draxler 33', 63'; Farfán 79'; Huntelaar 86'	
25	9 March 2013	15:30	Veltins-Arena	Gelsenkirchen	Borussia Dortmund	2–1	61,673	Draxler 12'; Huntelaar 35'	
26	16 March 2013	15:30	Stadion Nürnberg	Nürnberg	1. FC Nürnberg	0–3	45,000	—	
27	30 March 2013	15:30	Veltins-Arena	Gelsenkirchen	1899 Hoffenheim	3–0	60,743	Höger 71'; Raffael 79'; Pukki 83'	
28	6 April 2013	15:30	Weserstadion	Bremen	Werder Bremen	2–0	42,100	Draxler 51'; Marica 69'	
29	13 April 2013	18:30	Veltins-Arena	Gelsenkirchen	Bayer Leverkusen	2–2	61,619	Pukki 71'; Raffael 87'	
30	20 April 2013	15:30	Commerzbank-Arena	Frankfurt	Eintracht Frankfurt	0–1	51,500	—	
31	28 April 2013	17:30	Veltins-Arena	Gelsenkirchen	Hamburger SV	4–1	61,673	Bastos 9'; Huntelaar 20', 58', 66'	
32	3 May 2013	20:30	Borussia Park	Mönchengladbach	Borussia M'gladbach	1–0	54,010	Draxler 82'	
33	11 May 2013	15:30	Veltins-Arena	Gelsenkirchen	VfB Stuttgart	1–2	61,673	Niedermeier (o.g.) 92'	
34	18 May 2013	15:30	Mage Solar Stadion	Freiburg	SC Freiburg	2–1	24,000	Draxler 20'; Schuster (o.g.) 58'	

==== Final league table ====
Pos	Team	Pld	W	D	L	GF	GA	GD	Pts	Qualification or relegation
2	Borussia Dortmund	34	19	9	6	81	42	+39	66	Qualification for the Champions League group stage
3	Bayer Leverkusen	34	19	8	7	65	39	+26	65	Qualification for the Champions League group stage
4	Schalke 04	34	16	7	11	58	50	+8	55	Qualification for the Champions League play-off round
5	SC Freiburg	34	14	9	11	45	40	+5	51	Qualification for the Europa League group stage
6	Eintracht Frankfurt	34	14	9	11	49	46	+3	51	Qualification for the Europa League play-off round

Source: Bundesliga.de, kicker.de
Rules for classification: 1) points; 2) goal difference; 3) number of goals scored.

=== DFB-Pokal ===
Round	Date	Time	Venue	City	Opponent	Result^{1}	Attendance	Schalke 04 goalscorers	Source
1	19 August 2012	16:00	Ludwigsparkstadion	Saarbrücken	1. FC Saarbrücken	5–0	28,000	Papadopoulos 23'; Draxler 27', 57'; Marica 65', 72'	
2	30 October 2012	20:30	Veltins-Arena	Gelsenkirchen	SV Sandhausen	3–0	52,970	Afellay 11'; Marica 62'; Huntelaar 79'	
3	18 December 2012	19:00	Veltins-Arena	Gelsenkirchen	Mainz 05	1–2	54,202	Huntelaar 75'	

=== UEFA Champions League ===
==== Group stage ====
Match	Date	Time	Venue	City	Opponent	Result^{1}	Attendance	Schalke 04 goalscorers	Source
1	18 September 2012	20:45	Karaiskakis Stadium	Piraeus, Greece	Olympiacos	2–1	30,922	Höwedes 41'; Huntelaar 59'	
2	3 October 2012	20:45	Veltins-Arena	Gelsenkirchen, Germany	Montpellier	2–2	50,004	Draxler 26'; Huntelaar 52' (pen.)	
3	24 October 2012	20:45	Emirates Stadium	London, England	Arsenal	2–0	60,049	Huntelaar 76'; Afellay 86'	
4	6 November 2012	20:45	Veltins-Arena	Gelsenkirchen, Germany	Arsenal	2–2	54,142	Huntelaar 45+2'; Farfán 67'	
5	21 November 2012	20:45	Veltins-Arena	Gelsenkirchen, Germany	Olympiacos	1–0	52,254	Fuchs 77'	
6	4 December 2012	20:45	Stade de la Mosson	Montpellier, France	Montpellier	1–1	23,142	Höwedes 56'	

Pos	Team	Pld	W	D	L	GF	GA	GD	Pts	Qualification	SCH	ARS	OLY	MPL
1	(Germany) Schalke 04	6	3	3	0	10	6	+4	12	Advance to knockout phase	—	2–2	1–0	2–2
2	(England) Arsenal	6	3	1	2	10	8	+2	10	Advance to knockout phase	0–2	—	3–1	2–0
3	(Greece) Olympiacos	6	3	0	3	9	9	0	9	Transfer to Europa League	1–2	2–1	—	3–1
4	(France) Montpellier	6	0	2	4	6	12	−6	2		1–1	1–2	1–2	—

Source: Soccerway

==== Knockout phase ====
===== Round of 16 =====
20 February 2013 First leg	(Turkey) Galatasaray	1–1	Schalke 04	Istanbul, Turkey
20:45 CET	Yilmaz 12'		Jones 45'	Stadium: Türk Telekom Arena; Attendance: 45,000; Referee: Willie Collum (Scotland)

12 March 2013 Second leg	Schalke 04	2–3 (3–4 agg.)	Galatasaray (Turkey)	Gelsenkirchen, Germany
20:45 CET	Neustädter 17'; Bastos 63'		Altıntop 37'; Yılmaz 42'; Bulut 95'	Stadium: Veltins-Arena; Attendance: 54,142; Referee: Jonas Eriksson (Sweden)

== Squad ==
=== Squad and statistics ===
As of 18 May 2013

No.	Pos	Nat	Player	Total		Bundesliga		DFB-Pokal		Champions League	
No.	Pos	Nat	Player	Apps	Goals	Apps	Goals	Apps	Goals	Apps	Goals
1	GK	(Germany) GER	Ralf Fährmann	0	0	0	0	0	0	0	0
3	DF	(Spain) ESP	Sergio Escudero	0	0	0	0	0	0	0	0
4	DF	(Germany) GER	Benedikt Höwedes	43	2	32	0	3	0	8	2
8	FW	(Romania) ROU	Ciprian Marica	19	6	13	3	3	3	3	0
9	MF	(Brazil) BRA	Michel Bastos	16	5	14	4	0	0	2	1
10	MF	(Germany) GER	Lewis Holtby	27	4	19	4	2	0	6	0
11	MF	(Netherlands) NED	Ibrahim Afellay	15	4	10	2	1	1	4	1
12	MF	(Germany) GER	Marco Höger	30	3	22	3	2	0	6	0
13	MF	(United States) USA	Jermaine Jones	33	2	25	1	2	0	6	1
14	DF	(Greece) GRE	Kyriakos Papadopoulos	16	2	10	1	2	1	4	0
16	FW	(Brazil) BRA	Edu	2	0	1	0	1	0	0	0
17	FW	(Peru) PER	Jefferson Farfán	35	7	27	6	1	0	7	1
18	MF	(Brazil) BRA	Raffael	16	2	16	2	0	0	0	0
19	FW	(Nigeria) NGR	Chinedu Obasi	7	0	4	0	1	0	2	0
20	FW	(Finland) FIN	Teemu Pukki	24	3	17	3	2	0	5	0
21	DF	(Germany) GER	Christoph Metzelder	7	0	4	0	2	0	1	0
22	DF	(Japan) JPN	Atsuto Uchida	30	1	24	1	1	0	5	0
23	DF	(Austria) AUT	Christian Fuchs	37	1	29	0	2	0	6	1
25	FW	(Netherlands) NED	Klaas-Jan Huntelaar	35	16	26	10	2	2	7	4
27	MF	(Switzerland) SUI	Tranquillo Barnetta	31	0	21	0	3	0	7	0
28	MF	(Germany) GER	Christoph Moritz	7	0	6	0	1	0	0	0
29	MF	(Germany) GER	Max Meyer	6	0	5	0	0	0	1	0
30	MF	(Germany) GER	René Klingenburg	0	0	0	0	0	0	0	0
31	FW	(Germany) GER	Julian Draxler	39	13	30	10	3	2	6	1
32	DF	(Cameroon) CMR	Joël Matip	39	3	32	3	1	0	6	0
33	MF	(Russia) RUS	Roman Neustädter	41	4	31	3	2	0	8	1
34	GK	(Germany) GER	Timo Hildebrand	27	0	21	0	3	0	3	0
35	DF	(Bosnia and Herzegovina) BIH	Sead Kolašinac	20	0	16	0	1	0	3	0
36	GK	(Germany) GER	Lars Unnerstall	18	0	13	0	0	0	5	0

- transfers during the season. (blue) - transfers during the season (away). (red)

=== Transfers ===
==== In ====
No.	Pos.	Nat.	Name	Age	EU	Moving from	Type	Transfer window	Ends	Transfer fee	Source
9	MF	(Brazil)	Michel Bastos	29	EU	Lyon (France)	Loan	Winter	2014	€2,000,000	
18	MF	(Brazil)	Raffael	27	Non-EU	Dynamo Kyiv (Ukraine)	Loan	Winter	2013	€1,000,000	
29	MF	(Germany)	Max Meyer	17	EU	Youth system	Promoted	Winter	2015	N/A	
30	DF	(Germany)	René Klingenburg	18	EU	Youth system	Promoted	Winter	2015	N/A	
16	FW	(Brazil)	Edu	31	Non-EU	SpVgg Greuther Fürth	Return from Loan	Winter	2013	N/A	
35	DF	(Bosnia and Herzegovina)	Sead Kolašinac	19	EU	Youth system	Promoted	Summer	2015	N/A	
29	FW	(Germany)	Philipp Hofmann	19	EU	Youth system	Promoted	Summer	2014	N/A	
33	MF	(Russia)	Roman Neustädter	24	EU	Borussia Mönchengladbach	Transfer	Summer	2016	free	
19	FW	(Nigeria)	Chinedu Obasi	26	Non-EU	1899 Hoffenheim	Transfer	Summer	2015	€4,000,000	
27	MF	(Switzerland)	Tranquillo Barnetta	27	EU	Bayer Leverkusen	Transfer	Summer	2015	free	
11	MF	(Netherlands)	Ibrahim Afellay	26	EU	Barcelona (Spain)	Loan	Summer	2013	€500,000	
25	DF	(Peru)	Carlos Zambrano	22	Non-EU	FC St. Pauli	Return from Loan	Summer		N/A	
20	DF	(Greece)	Vasileios Pliatsikas	24	EU	MSV Duisburg	Return from Loan	Summer	2013	N/A	
22	FW	(Switzerland)	Mario Gavranović	22	Non-EU	Mainz 05	Return from Loan	Summer	?	N/A	
16	MF	(Czech Republic)	Jan Morávek	22	EU	FC Augsburg	Return from Loan	Summer	?	N/A	
26	MF	(Romania)	Ciprian Deac	26	EU	Rapid București (Romania)	Return from Loan	Summer		N/A	
40	MF	(Ghana)	Anthony Annan	25	Non-EU	Vitesse Arnhem (Netherlands)	Return from Loan	Summer	2014	N/A	
16	FW	(Brazil)	Edu	30	Non-EU	Beşiktaş (Turkey)	Return from Loan	Summer	2013	N/A	

==== Out ====
No.	Pos.	Nat.	Name	Age	EU	Moving to	Type	Transfer window	Transfer fee	Source
16	FW	(Brazil)	Edu	31	Non-EU	Liaoning Whowin (China)	Transfer	Winter	free	
23	MF	(Germany)	Lewis Holtby	22	EU	Tottenham Hotspur (England)	Transfer	Winter	€1,750,000	
16	DF	(Spain)	Sergio Escudero	23	EU	Getafe (Spain)	Loan	Winter	€200,000	
2	DF	(Peru)	Carlos Zambrano	22	Non-EU	Eintracht Frankfurt	Transfer	Summer	€750,000	
14	MF	(Czech Republic)	Jan Morávek	22	EU	FC Augsburg	Transfer	Summer	€700,000	
7	MF	(Romania)	Ciprian Deac	26	EU	CFR Cluj (Romania)	Transfer	Summer	€700,000	
24	MF	(Germany)	Peer Kluge	31	EU	Hertha BSC	Transfer	Summer	€250,000	
7	FW	(Spain)	Raúl	35	EU	Al Sadd (Qatar)	Transfer	Summer	free	
7	FW	(Switzerland)	Mario Gavranović	22	EU	Zürich (Switzerland)	Transfer	Summer	free	
9	MF	(Germany)	Alexander Baumjohann	25	EU	1. FC Kaiserslautern	Transfer	Summer	free	
20	MF	(Georgia (country))	Levan Kenia	21	Non-EU	Karpaty Lviv (Ukraine)	Transfer	Summer	free	
19	FW	(Germany)	Andreas Wiegel	21	EU	Erzgebirge Aue	Transfer	Summer	free	
19	MF	(Spain)	José Manuel Jurado	26	EU	Spartak Moscow (Russia)	Loan	Summer	€1,500,000	
11	MF	(Ghana)	Anthony Annan	26	Non-EU	Osasuna (Spain)	Loan	Summer	€300,000	
9	FW	(Germany)	Philipp Hofmann	19	EU	SC Paderborn	Loan	Summer	€100,000	
23	DF	(Germany)	Tim Hoogland	27	EU	VfB Stuttgart	Loan	Summer	€300,000	
16	FW	(Brazil)	Edu	30	Non-EU	SpVgg Greuther Fürth	Loan	Summer	€300,000	
11	MF	(Greece)	Vasileios Pliatsikas	24	EU	Youth system	Promoted	Summer	N/A	
33	GK	(Germany)	Mathias Schober	36	EU		End of career	Summer	N/A	
2	DF	(Ghana)	Hans Sarpei	36	EU		End of career	Summer	N/A	
19	FW	(Nigeria)	Chinedu Obasi	26	Non-EU	1899 Hoffenheim	End of loan	Summer	N/A	

== Kits ==
Home	Home Alt.	Home Alt. 2	Away	Away Alt.	Third

Type	Shirt	Shorts	Socks	First appearance / Info
Home	Blue	White	Blue	
Home Alt.	Blue	Blue	Blue	Friendly, 27 July against Magdeburg
Home Alt. 2	Blue	Blue	White	Bundesliga, Match 14, 27 November against Hamburg
Away	White	White	White	
Away Alt.	White	Blue	White	Bundesliga, Match 24, 2 March against Wolfsburg
Third	Ultrabeauty	Navy	Navy	
