= 2011–12 FC Schalke 04 season =

Schalke 04
2011–12 season
- President: Josef Schnusenberg
- Head coach: Ralf Rangnick (stepped down on 22 September 2011); Seppo Eichkorn (caretaker; until 26 September 2011); Huub Stevens (from 26 September 2011)
- Stadium: Veltins-Arena
- Bundesliga: 3rd
- DFB-Pokal: Round 3
- DFL-Supercup: Winners
- UEFA Europa League: Quarter-finals
- Top goalscorer: League: Klaas-Jan Huntelaar (29); All: Klaas-Jan Huntelaar (48)
Home colours	Away colours	Third colours

The 2011–12 season was the 108th season in Schalke 04's history. The team competed in the Bundesliga, DFB-Pokal and the UEFA Europa League. The team's top scorer was Klaas-Jan Huntelaar with 29 goals in the Bundesliga and 48 in total.

== Competitions ==
=== Legend ===
Win Draw Loss

=== Bundesliga ===
==== League table ====
Pos	Team	Pld	W	D	L	GF	GA	GD	Pts	Qualification or relegation
1	Borussia Dortmund (C)	34	25	6	3	80	25	+55	81	Qualification to Champions League group stage
2	Bayern Munich	34	23	4	7	77	22	+55	73	Qualification to Champions League group stage
3	Schalke 04	34	20	4	10	74	44	+30	64	Qualification to Champions League group stage
4	Borussia Mönchengladbach	34	17	9	8	49	24	+25	60	Qualification to Champions League play-off round
5	Bayer Leverkusen	34	15	9	10	52	44	+8	54	Qualification to Europa League group stage (Note: The 2011–12 DFB-Pokal champions (Borussia Dortmund) and runners-up (Bayern Munich) qualified for the 2012–13 UEFA Champions League, thus the three Europa League places were distributed through league positions.)

Source: kicker
Rules for classification: 1) points; 2) goal difference; 3) number of goals scored.
(C) Champions

==== Matches ====
6 August 2011 1	VfB Stuttgart	3–0	Schalke 04	Stuttgart
15:30 CEST (UTC+02)	Cacau 37'; Harnik 57'; Okazaki 89'	Report		Stadium: Mercedes-Benz Arena; Attendance: 60,000; Referee: Wolfgang Stark; Man of the Match: Ulreich

13 August 2011 2	Schalke 04	5–1	1. FC Köln	Gelsenkirchen
15:30 CEST (UTC+02)	Huntelaar 42' (pen.), 47', 84'; Holtby 48'; Raúl 59'	Report	Podolski 12'	Stadium: Veltins-Arena; Attendance: 61,673; Referee: Guido Winkmann; Man of the Match: Huntelaar

21 August 2011 3	Mainz 05	2–4	Schalke 04	Mainz
15:30 CEST (UTC+02)	Ivanschitz 7'; Soto 12'	Report	Huntelaar 57'; Höwedes 64'; Matip 81'; Fuchs 90'	Stadium: Coface Arena; Attendance: 34,000; Referee: Günter Perl; Man of the Match: Farfán

28 August 2011 4	Schalke 04	1–0	Borussia Mönchengladbach	Gelsenkirchen
17:30 CEST (UTC+02)	Raúl 64'	Report		Stadium: Veltins-Arena; Attendance: 61,673; Referee: Felix Zwayer; Man of the Match: Farfán

11 September 2011 5	VfL Wolfsburg	2–1	Schalke 04	Wolfsburg
17:30 CEST (UTC+02)	Mandžukić 33', 82'	Report	Raúl 13'	Stadium: Volkswagen Arena; Attendance: 30,000; Referee: Deniz Aytekin; Man of the Match: Mandžukić

18 September 2011 6	Schalke 04	0–2	Bayern Munich	Gelsenkirchen
17:30 CEST (UTC+02)		Report	Petersen 21'; Müller 75'	Stadium: Veltins-Arena; Attendance: 61,673; Referee: Florian Meyer; Man of the Match: Ribéry

24 September 2011 7	Schalke 04	4–2	SC Freiburg	Gelsenkirchen
15:30 CEST (UTC+02)	Farfán 33'; Huntelaar 62'; Holtby 67'; Raúl 75'	Report	Cissé 2'; Jendrišek 83'	Stadium: Veltins-Arena; Attendance: 60,545; Referee: Markus Wingenbach; Man of the Match: Farfán

2 October 2011 8	Hamburger SV	1–2	Schalke 04	Hamburg
17:30 CEST (UTC+02)	Petrić 37'	Report	Huntelaar 13', 73'	Stadium: Imtech Arena; Attendance: 54,237; Referee: Knut Kircher; Man of the Match: Huntelaar

15 October 2011 9	Schalke 04	1–2	1. FC Kaiserslautern	Gelsenkirchen
18:30 CEST (UTC+02)	Huntelaar 62' (pen.)	Report	Tiffert 30' (pen.); Kouemaha 72'	Stadium: Veltins-Arena; Attendance: 61,673; Referee: Peter Sippel; Man of the Match: Kouemaha

23 October 2011 10	Bayer Leverkusen	0–1	Schalke 04	Leverkusen
15:30 CEST (UTC+02)		Report	Farfán 82'	Stadium: BayArena; Attendance: 30,210; Referee: Felix Zwayer; Man of the Match: Unnerstall

29 October 2011 11	Schalke 04	3–1	1899 Hoffenheim	Gelsenkirchen
15:30 CEST (UTC+02)	Raúl 28'; Huntelaar 73' (pen.), 76'	Report	Ibišević 63'	Stadium: Veltins-Arena; Attendance: 60,384; Referee: Tobias Welz; Man of the Match: Holtby

6 November 2011 12	Hannover 96	2–2	Schalke 04	Hanover
15:30 CET (UTC+01)	Papadopoulos 26' (o.g.); Abdellaoue 59'	Report	Pukki 26', 73'	Stadium: AWD-Arena; Attendance: 49,000; Referee: Wolfgang Stark; Man of the Match: Pukki

19 November 2011 13	Schalke 04	4–0	1. FC Nürnberg	Gelsenkirchen
15:30 CET (UTC+01)	Huntelaar 13', 66'; Raúl 39'; Holtby 84'	Report		Stadium: Veltins-Arena; Attendance: 61,673; Referee: Knut Kircher; Man of the Match: Huntelaar

26 November 2011 14	Borussia Dortmund	2–0	Schalke 04	Dortmund
15:30 CET (UTC+01)	Lewandowski 16'; Santana 61'	Report		Stadium: Signal-Iduna-Park; Attendance: 80,720; Referee: Florian Meyer; Man of the Match: Lewandowski

4 December 2011 15	Schalke 04	3–1	FC Augsburg	Gelsenkirchen
17:30 CET (UTC+01)	Huntelaar 16'; Fuchs 66'; Raúl 84'	Report	Mölders 47'	Stadium: Veltins-Arena; Attendance: 58,641; Referee: Markus Wingenbach; Man of the Match: Fuchs

9 December 2011 16	Hertha BSC	1–2	Schalke 04	Berlin
20:30 CET (UTC+01)	Ramos 84'	Report	Huntelaar 19'; Pukki 44'	Stadium: Olympic Stadium (Berlin); Attendance: 52,382; Referee: Günter Perl; Man of the Match: Huntelaar

17 December 2011 17	Schalke 04	5–0	Werder Bremen	Gelsenkirchen
18:30 CET (UTC+01)	Raúl 15', 20', 63'; Papadopoulos 67'; Huntelaar 70'	Report		Stadium: Veltins-Arena; Attendance: 61,673; Referee: Manuel Gräfe; Man of the Match: Raúl

21 January 2012 18	Schalke 04	3–1	VfB Stuttgart	Gelsenkirchen
15:30 CET (UTC+01)	Matip 3'; Höger (yellow card) 45+1'; Papadopoulos 57'; Draxler 80'	Report	Hajnal (yellow card) 29'; Okazaki 87'	Stadium: Veltins-Arena; Attendance: 61,673; Referee: Felix Brych

28 January 2012 19	1. FC Köln	1–4	Schalke 04	Cologne
18:30 CET (UTC+01)	Podolski 4'; Geromel (yellow card) 18'; Brečko (red card) 78'	Report	Uchida (yellow card) 35'; Matip (yellow card) 53'; Marica 60', 72'; Huntelaar 78' (pen.); Höger 82'	Stadium: RheinEnergieStadion; Attendance: 50,000; Referee: Jochen Drees

4 February 2012 20	Schalke 04	1–1	Mainz 05	Gelsenkirchen
15:30 CET (UTC+01)	Obasi 59'	Report	Zidan 15'	Stadium: Veltins-Arena; Attendance: 60,557; Referee: Deniz Aytekin

11 February 2012 21	Borussia Mönchengladbach	3–0	Schalke 04	Mönchengladbach
18:30 CET (UTC+01)	Reus 2'; Hanke 15'; Arango 32'	Report		Stadium: Borussia-Park; Attendance: 54,049; Referee: Manuel Gräfe

19 February 2012 22	Schalke 04	4–0	VfL Wolfsburg	Gelsenkirchen
15:30 CET (UTC+01)	Raúl 10'; Huntelaar 15', 72'; Matip 49'	Report		Stadium: Veltins-Arena; Attendance: 60,511; Referee: Peter Sippel

26 February 2012 23	Bayern Munich	2–0	Schalke 04	Munich
15:30 CET (UTC+01)	Ribéry 36', 55'			Stadium: Allianz Arena; Attendance: 69,000; Referee: Michael Weiner

3 March 2012 24	SC Freiburg	2–1	Schalke 04	Freiburg
15:30 (CET) (UTC+01)	Freis 18'; Caligiuri 66' (pen.)		Pukki 72'	Stadium: badenova-Stadion; Attendance: 24,000; Referee: Marco Fritz

11 March 2012 25	Schalke 04	3–1	Hamburger SV	Gelsenkirchen
17:30 (CET) (UTC+01)	Pukki 5'; Metzelder 26'; Huntelaar 33' (pen.)		Kačar 45'	Stadium: Veltins-Arena; Attendance: 61,673; Referee: Wolfgang Stark

18 March 2012 26	1. FC Kaiserslautern	1–4	Schalke 04	Kaiserslautern
15:30 (CET) (UTC+01)	Rodnei 3'		Holtby 39'; Huntelaar 45'; Raúl 51'; Farfán 81'	Stadium: Fritz-Walter-Stadion; Attendance: 49,780; Referee: Peter Gagelmann

24 March 2012 27	Schalke 04	2–0	Bayer Leverkusen	Gelsenkirchen
18:30 (CET) (UTC+01)	Huntelaar 18', 86'			Stadium: Veltins-Arena; Attendance: 61,673; Referee: Deniz Aytekin

1 April 2012 28	1899 Hoffenheim	1–1	Schalke 04	Sinsheim
17:30 CEST (UTC+02)	Rudy (yellow card) 19'; Salihović 30' (pen.); Vorsah (yellow card) 71'		Jones (yellow card) 23'; Unnerstall (yellow card) 29'; Papadopoulos (yellow card) 39'; Matip (yellow card) 42'; Huntelaar 80' (pen.)	Stadium: Rhein-Neckar-Arena; Attendance: 30,150; Referee: Markus Schmidt

8 April 2012 29	Schalke 04	3–0	Hannover 96	Gelsenkirchen
15:30 CEST (UTC+02)	Raúl 6', 47'; Huntelaar 63'			Stadium: Veltins-Arena; Attendance: 61,673; Referee: Tobias Stieler

11 April 2012 30	1. FC Nürnberg	4–1	Schalke 04	Nuremberg
20:00 CEST (UTC+02)	Balitsch 25'; Simons 37' (pen.); Didavi 45', 87'		Holtby 85'	Stadium: easyCredit-Stadion; Attendance: 44,031; Referee: Florian Meyer

14 April 2012 31	Schalke 04	1–2	Borussia Dortmund	Gelsenkirchen
15:30 CEST (UTC+02)	Farfán 9'		Piszczek 17'; Kehl 63'	Stadium: Veltins-Arena; Attendance: 61,673; Referee: Manuel Gräfe

22 April 2012 32	FC Augsburg	1–1	Schalke 04	Augsburg
15:30 CEST (UTC+02)	Langkamp 6'		Huntelaar 38'	Stadium: SGL arena Attendance: 30,660; Referee: Christian Dingert

28 April 2012 33	Schalke 04	4–0	Hertha BSC	Gelsenkirchen
15:30 CEST (UTC+02)	Huntelaar 32', 88'; Holtby 73'; Raúl 84'			Stadium: Veltins-Arena; Attendance: 61,673; Referee: Günter Perl

5 May 2012 34	Werder Bremen	2–3	Schalke 04	Bremen
15:30 CEST (UTC+02)	Pizarro 41' (pen.), 82'		Draxler 30'; Huntelaar 65', 74'	Stadium: Weserstadion; Attendance: 42,100; Referee: Deniz Aytekin

=== DFB-Pokal ===
31 July Round 1	FC Teningen	1–11	Schalke 04	Freiburg
17:30 CEST (UTC+02)	Kirstein 20'	Report	Huntelaar 3', 22', 39', 64'; Papadopoulos 7'; Raúl 13', 32'; Holtby 57', 75'; Gavranović 70', 78'	Stadium: Badenova-Stadion; Attendance: 21,000; Referee: Tobias Stieler

26 October Round 2	Karlsruher SC	0–2	Schalke 04	Karlsruhe
19:00 CEST (UTC+02)		Report	Huntelaar 81'; Matip 83'	Stadium: Wildparkstadion; Attendance: 28,916; Referee: Günter Perl; Man of the Match: Unnerstall

21 December Round 3	Borussia Mönchengladbach	3–1	Schalke 04	Mönchengladbach
20:30 CET (UTC+01)	Arango 18'; Reus 56', 88'	Report	Draxler 70'	Stadium: Borussia-Park; Attendance: 54,057; Referee: Wolfgang Stark; Man of the Match: Reus

=== DFL-Supercup ===
23 July 2011 Final	Schalke 04	0–0 (4–3 p)	Borussia Dortmund	Veltins-Arena, Gelsenkirchen
20:30 CEST		Report		Attendance: 61,673; Referee: Knut Kircher (Rottenburg)
	Penalties
	Holtby (penalty scored); Edu (penalty scored); Höwedes (penalty scored); Jurado (penalty scored)		(penalty scored) Gündoğan; (penalty scored) Hummels; (penalty missed) Großkreutz; (penalty scored) Leitner; (penalty missed) Perišić

=== UEFA Europa League ===
==== Play-off round ====
18 August 2011 First leg	HJK (Finland)	2–0	(Germany) Schalke 04	Helsinki, Finland
18:30 CEST (UTC+02)	Pukki 18', 54'	Report		Stadium: Finnair Stadium; Attendance: 10,700; Referee: Fernando Teixeira Vitienes (Spain); Man of the Match: Pukki

25 August 2011 Second leg	Schalke 04 (Germany)	6–1 (6–3 agg.)	(Finland) HJK	Gelsenkirchen, Germany
20:20 CEST (UTC+02)	Huntelaar 15' (pen.), 25', 49' (pen.), 63'; Papadopoulos 56'; Draxler 82'	Report	Pukki 20'	Stadium: Veltins-Arena; Attendance: 52,034; Referee: Leontios Trattou (Cyprus); Man of the Match: Huntelaar

==== Group stage ====
Pos	Team	Pld	W	D	L	GF	GA	GD	Pts	Qualification
1	(Germany) Schalke 04	6	4	2	0	13	2	+11	14	Advance to knockout phase
2	(Romania) Steaua București	6	2	2	2	9	11	−2	8	Advance to knockout phase
3	(Israel) Maccabi Haifa	6	2	0	4	10	12	−2	6	
4	(Cyprus) AEK Larnaca	6	1	2	3	4	11	−7	5	

Source: Soccerway

15 September 2011 1	Steaua București (Romania)	0–0	(Germany) Schalke 04	Cluj-Napoca, Romania
21:05 CEST (UTC+02)		Report		Stadium: Stadionul Dr. Constantin Rădulescu; Attendance: 18,000; Referee: Michail Koukoulakis (Greece); Man of the Match: Höwedes

29 September 2011 2	Schalke 04 (Germany)	3–1	(Israel) Maccabi Haifa	Gelsenkirchen, Germany
19:00 CEST (UTC+02)	Fuchs 8', 65'; Jurado 81'	Report	Vered 35'	Stadium: Veltins-Arena; Attendance: 49,070; Referee: Manuel Jorge Neves Moreira de Sousa (Portugal); Man of the Match: Fuchs

20 October 2011 3	AEK Larnaca (Cyprus)	0–5	(Germany) Schalke 04	Nicosia, Cyprus
19:00 CEST (UTC+02)		Report	Holtby 23'; Huntelaar 35', 88'; Matip 40'; Draxler 87'	Stadium: GSP Stadium; Attendance: 6,000; Referee: Luca Banti (Italy); Man of the Match: Huntelaar

3 November 2011 4	Schalke 04 (Germany)	0–0	(Cyprus) AEK Larnaca	Gelsenkirchen, Germany
21:05 CET (UTC+01)		Report		Stadium: Veltins-Arena; Attendance: 52,077; Referee: Hannes Kaasik (Estonia); Man of the Match: Unnerstall

1 December 2011 5	Schalke 04 (Germany)	2–1	(Romania) Steaua București	Gelsenkirchen, Germany
19:00 CET (UTC+01)	Papadopoulos 25'; Raúl 57'	Report	Rusescu 33'	Stadium: Veltins-Arena; Attendance: 53,123; Referee: Antonio Mateu Lahoz (Spain); Man of the Match: Raúl

14 December 2011 6	Maccabi Haifa (Israel)	0–3	(Germany) Schalke 04	Haifa, Israel
21:05 CET (UTC+01)			Buljat 8' (o.g.); Marica 84'; Wiegel 90+2'	Stadium: Kiryat Eliezer Stadium; Attendance: 14,000; Referee: Fredy Fautrel (France)

==== Knockout phase ====
===== Round of 32 =====
16 February 2012 First leg	Viktoria Plzeň (Czech Republic)	1–1	(Germany) Schalke 04	Prague, Czech Republic
19:00 CET (UTC+01)	Darida 22'	Report	Huntelaar 75'	Stadium: Synot Tip Arena; Attendance: 11,435; Referee: Stéphane Lannoy (France)

23 February 2012 Second leg	Schalke 04 (Germany)	3–1 (a.e.t.) (4–2 agg.)	(Czech Republic) Viktoria Plzeň	Gelsenkirchen, Germany
21:05	Huntelaar 8', 106', 120+1'	Report	Rajtoral 88'	Stadium: Veltins-Arena; Attendance: 50,000; Referee: Alan Kelly, Republic of Ireland

===== Round of 16 =====
8 March 2012 First leg	Twente (Netherlands)	1–0	(Germany) Schalke 04	Enschede, Netherlands
19:00 (CET)	De Jong 61' (pen.)	Report		Stadium: De Grolsch Veste; Attendance: 30,000; Referee: Craig Thomson (Scotland)

15 March 2012 Second leg	Schalke 04 (Germany)	4–1 (4–2 agg.)	(Netherlands) Twente	Gelsenkirchen, Germany
21:05 (CET)	Huntelaar 29', 57' (pen.), 81'; Jones 71'	Report	Janssen 14'	Stadium: Veltins-Arena; Attendance: 52,000; Referee: Viktor Kassai (Hungary)

===== Quarter-finals =====
29 March 2012 First leg	Schalke 04 (Germany)	2–4	(Spain) Athletic Bilbao	Gelsenkirchen, Germany
21:05 (CEST)	Raúl 22', 60'; Höger (yellow card) 54'; Uchida (yellow card) 67'; Huntelaar (yellow card) 76'	Report	Iturraspe (yellow card) 8'; Llorente 20', 73'; Amorebieta (yellow card) 63'; Pérez (yellow card) 80'; De Marcos 81'; Muniain 90+3'	Stadium: Veltins-Arena; Attendance: 52,000; Referee: Pedro Proença (Portugal)

5 April 2012 Second leg	Athletic Bilbao (Spain)	2–2 (6–4 agg.)	(Germany) Schalke 04	Bilbao, Spain
21:05 (CET)	Ibai 41'; Martínez (yellow card) 53'; Susaeta 55'; De Marcos (yellow card) 72'	Report	Obasi (yellow card) 28'; Huntelaar 29'; Raúl 52'; Matip (yellow card) 75'; Papadopoulos (yellow card) 79'	Stadium: San Mamés Stadium; Attendance: 40,000; Referee: Nicola Rizzoli (Italy)

== Player information ==
=== Roster and statistics ===
As of 10 December 2011

Squad Season 2011-12 Sources:
Player					Bundesliga		DFB-Pokal		Europa League		Totals	
Player	Nat.	Birthday	at Schalke 04 since	Previous club	Matches	Goals	Matches	Goal	Matches	Goals	Matches	Goals
Goalkeepers
Ralf Fährmann	(Germany)	27 September 1988	2011	Eintracht Frankfurt	9	0	0	0	4	0	13	0
Timo Hildebrand	(Germany)	5 April 1979	2011	Sporting CP	0	0	0	0	1	0	1	0
Mathias Schober	(Germany)	8 April 1976	2007	Hansa Rostock	0	0	0	0	0	0	0	0
Lars Unnerstall	(Germany)	20 July 1990	2008	Preußen Münster	8	0	2	0	3	0	13	0
Defenders
Sergio Escudero	(Spain)	2 September 1989	2010	Real Murcia	1	0	0	0	1	0	2	0
Christian Fuchs	(Austria)	20 July 1986	2011	Mainz 05	16	2	2	0	7	2	25	4
Tim Hoogland	(Germany)	11 June 1985	2010	Mainz 05	0	0	0	0	0	0	0	0
Benedikt Höwedes	(Germany)	29 February 1988	2001	SG Herten-Langenbochum	13	1	2	0	6	0	21	1
Christoph Metzelder	(Germany)	5 November 1980	2010	Real Madrid	6	0	0	0	2	0	8	0
Kyriakos Papadopoulos	(Greece)	23 February 1992	2010	Olympiacos	15	0	2	1	7	2	24	3
Hans Sarpei	(Ghana)	28 June 1976	2010	Bayer Leverkusen	0	0	0	0	1	0	1	0
Atsuto Uchida	(Japan)	27 March 1988	2010	Kashima Antlers	5	0	0	0	5	0	10	0
Midfielders
Alexander Baumjohann	(Germany)	23 January 1987	2010	Bayern Munich	6	0	1	0	5	0	12	0
Julian Draxler	(Germany)	20 September 1993	2001	SSV Buer 07/28	15	0	1	0	8	2	24	2
Marco Höger	(Germany)	16 September 1989	2011	Alemannia Aachen	10	0	2	0	7	0	19	0
Lewis Holtby	(Germany)	18 September 1990	2011	Mainz 05	16	3	2	2	7	1	25	6
Jermaine Jones	(United States)	3 November 1981	2011	Blackburn Rovers	9	0	2	0	3	0	14	0
José Manuel Jurado	(Spain)	3 November 1981	2010	Atlético Madrid	10	0	1	0	5	0	16	0
Levan Kenia	(Georgia (country))	18 October 1990	2008	Lokomotivi Tbilisi	0	0	0	0	0	0	0	0
Peer Kluge	(Germany)	22 November 1980	2010	1. FC Nürnberg	3	0	0	0	0	0	3	0
Joël Matip	(Cameroon)	8 August 1991	2000	VfL Bochum	14	1	2	1	7	1	23	3
Jan Morávek	(Czech Republic)	1 November 1989	2011	1. FC Kaiserslautern	6	0	2	0	4	0	12	0
Christoph Moritz	(Germany)	27 January 1990	2011	Alemannia Aachen	2	0	0	0	2	0	4	0
Forwards
Jefferson Farfán	(Peru)	26 October 1984	2008	PSV	10	2	1	0	5	0	16	2
Klaas-Jan Huntelaar	(Netherlands)	12 August 1983	2010	Milan	15	14	2	5	7	6	24	25
Ciprian Marica	(Romania)	2 October 1985	2011	VfB Stuttgart	10	0	2	0	6	1	18	1
Chinedu Obasi	(Nigeria)	1 June 1986	2012	1899 Hoffenheim	0	0	0	0	0	0	0	0
Teemu Pukki	(Finland)	29 March 1990	2011	HJK	7	5	1	0	0^{1}	0^{1}	8	5
Raúl	(Spain)	27 June 1977	2010	Real Madrid	16	7	2	2	5	1	23	10
Andreas Wiegel	(Germany)	21 July 1991	2006	SC Paderborn	0	0	0	0	1	1	1	1

- 1.Teemu Pukki played four matches and scored two goals in the 2011–12 UEFA Champions League qualifying phase and played two matches and scored three goals in the 2011–12 UEFA Europa League for HJK.

=== Transfers ===
==== In ====
No.	Pos.	Nat.	Name	Age	EU	Moving from	Type	Transfer window	Ends	Transfer fee	Source
	GK	(Germany)	Ralf Fährmann	22	EU	Eintracht Frankfurt	Transfer	Summer	2015	Free	
	DF	(Austria)	Christian Fuchs	24	EU	Mainz 05	Transfer	Summer	2015	Undisclosed	
	MF	(Germany)	Marco Höger	21	EU	Alemannia Aachen	Transfer	Summer	2014	Undisclosed	
	FW	(Germany)	Andreas Wiegel	19	EU	Youth system	Contract	Summer	2013	Free	
	FW	(Finland)	Teemu Pukki	21	EU	HJK (Finland)		Summer	2014		
	GK	(Germany)	Timo Hildebrand	32	EU	Free agent	S	Summer	2012	Free	

==== Out ====
No.	Pos.	Nat.	Name	Age	EU	Moving to	Type	Transfer window	Transfer fee	Source
	GK	(Germany)	Manuel Neuer	25	EU	Bayern Munich	Transfer	Summer		
	DF	(Germany)	Christian Pander	27	EU	Hannover 96	Free Agent	Summer	Free	
	DF	(Norway)	Tore Reginiussen	25	Non-EU	OB (Denmark)	Transfer	Summer		
	DF	(Germany)	Lukas Schmitz	22	EU	Werder Bremen	Transfer	Summer		
	FW	(Germany)	Marvin Pourie	20	EU	Silkeborg IF (Denmark)	Transfer	Summer		
	DF	(France)	Nicolas Plestan	30	EU		Released	Summer	Free	
	FW	(Germany)	Gerald Asamoah	32	EU		Contract terminated	Summer	Free	
	FW	(China)	Hao Junmin	24	Non-EU	Shandong Luneng Taishan (China)	Transfer	Summer		
	FW	(Switzerland)	Mario Gavranović	21	Non-EU	Mainz 05	Transfer	Summer		

== Coaching staff ==
- Felix Magath (Head Coach)

== Kits ==
Home	Home Alternate	Home Alt. 2	Home Alt. 3	Home Alt. 4

Away	Away Alternate	Third	Third Alternate

Type	Shirt	Shorts	Socks	First appearance / Info
Home	Blue	White	Blue / White	
Home Alt.	Blue	Blue	Blue / White	Bundesliga, Match 3, August 21 against Mainz 05
Home Alt. 2	Blue	Blue	White	Bundesliga, Match 8, October 2 against Hamburger SV
Home Alt. 3	Blue	White	Blue	Bundesliga, Match 12, November 6 against Hannover 96
Home Alt. 4	Blue	Blue	Blue	Bundesliga, Match 32, April 22 against FC Augsburg
Away	White	White	White	
Away Alt.	White	Blue	White	Bundesliga, Match 5, September 11 against VfL Wolfsburg
Third	Ultrabeauty	Navy	Navy	
Third Alt.	Ultrabeauty	Ultrabeauty	Ultrabeauty	UEFA EL, Play-off, August 15 against HJK
