= Roman Neustädter =

Russian footballer (born 1988)

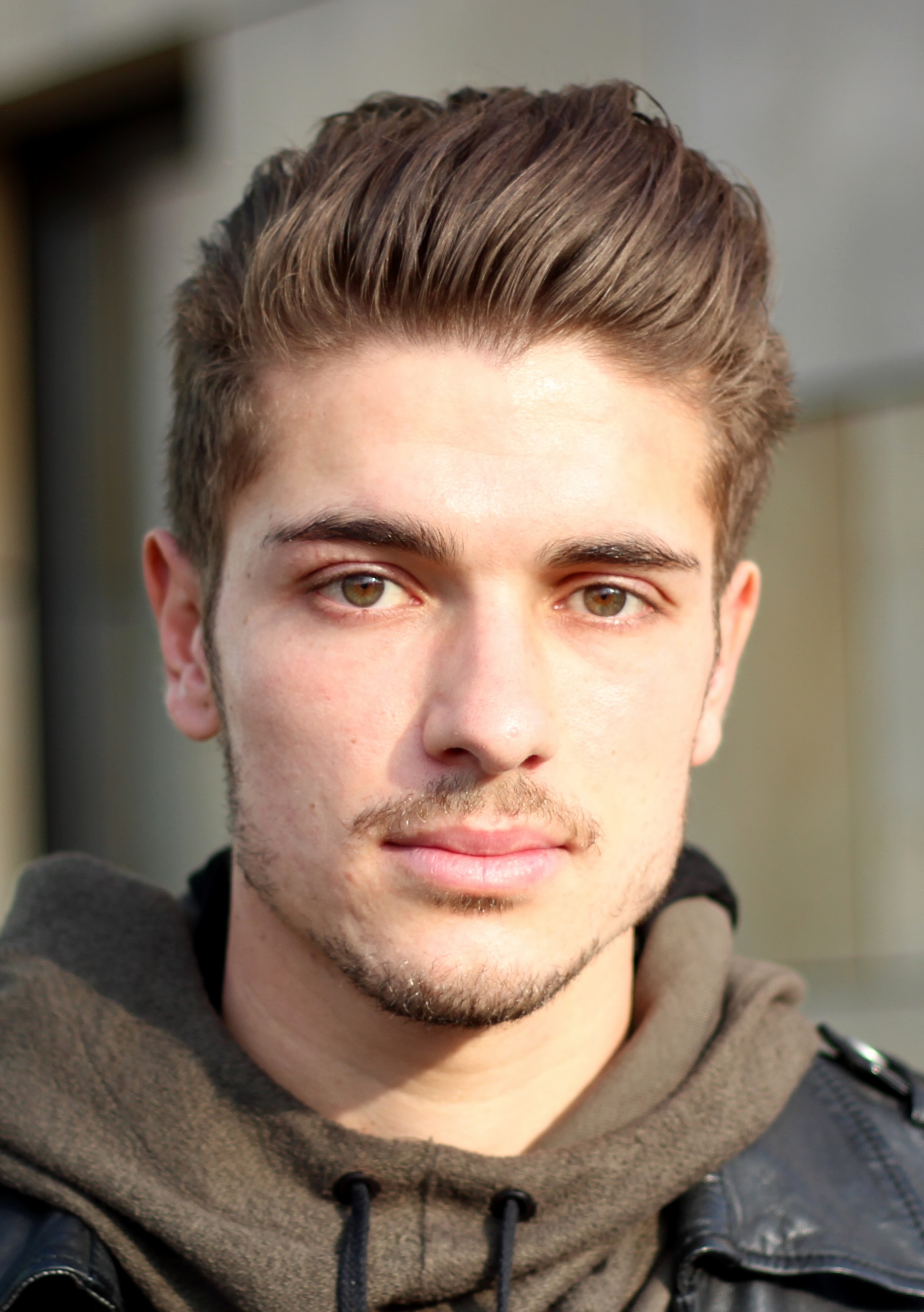
- Neustädter in 2015

Personal information
- Full name: Roman Petrovich Neustädter
- Date of birth: 18 February 1988 (age 38)
- Place of birth: Dnipropetrovsk, Ukrainian SSR, Soviet Union
- Height: 1.90 m (6 ft 3 in)
- Positions: Centre-back; defensive midfielder

Team information
- Current team: Westerlo (assistant manager)

Youth career
- 1994–2006: Mainz 05

Senior career*
Years	Team	Apps	(Gls)
2006–2009	Mainz 05 II	66	(9)
2008–2009	Mainz 05	16	(0)
2009–2010	Borussia Mönchengladbach II	23	(3)
2009–2012	Borussia Mönchengladbach	59	(1)
2012–2016	Schalke 04	122	(7)
2016–2019	Fenerbahçe	71	(4)
2019–2021	Dynamo Moscow	36	(1)
2022–2026	Westerlo	106	(2)

International career
2008	Germany U20	2	(0)
2009	Germany U21	1	(0)
2012–2013	Germany	2	(0)
2016–2020	Russia	13	(1)

Managerial career
- 2026–: Westerlo (assistant)
- * Club domestic league appearances and goals

Roman Petrovich Neustädter (Russian: Рома́н Петро́вич Нойште́дтер; born 18 February 1988) is a professional footballer coach and a former player who is an assistant manager with Belgian Pro League club Westerlo.

Born in Ukraine, Neustädter played for Germany at various youth levels and was capped twice by the Germany national team in 2012 and 2013. He switched allegiance to Russia in 2016.

Neustädter has often played as a defensive midfielder and centre back. While the former is his preferred position, he mostly played as the latter during his stint at Schalke.

== Club career ==
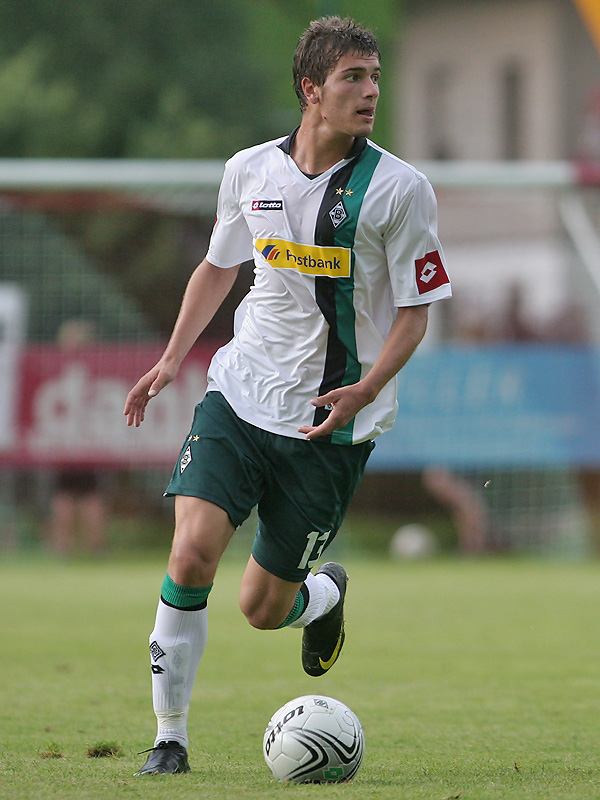
Neustädter playing for Borussia Mönchengladbach in 2009

Neustädter began his career in Mainz 05's youth team, before being promoted to Mainz 05 II in July 2006. After playing in Mainz's first team during the 2008–09 season, he signed a three-year contract with Borussia Mönchengladbach. With die Fohlen, Neustädter enjoyed a particularly successful 2011–12 season, finishing fourth and qualifying for the 2012–13 UEFA Champions League.

At the end of the 2011–12 season, Neustädter left Mönchengladbach and joined Schalke 04 on a free transfer, signing a four-year contract running until 30 June 2016.

In July 2016, after turning down a new contract at Schalke, Neustädter signed a three-year deal at Fenerbahçe of Turkey.

On 9 August 2019, he signed a one-year contract with Russian club Dynamo Moscow. On 15 October 2020, after the first 10 games of the 2020–21 Russian Premier League were played, he returned to Dynamo until the end of the season.

He ended his professional career in August 2026 and was appointed assistant manager at his last club Westerlo.

== International career ==
Neustädter played twice for Germany U-20, making his debut as a substitute against Italy U-20 on 9 April 2008. He scored a goal against Switzerland U-20 on 22 April 2008.

The Football Federation of Ukraine has expressed interest in calling up Neustädter for their national team. Neustädter, who was born in Ukrainian SSR, has indicated that he would be likely to accept a call-up if asked. He would first require to obtain a Ukrainian passport in order to be eligible for national team duties.

On 9 November 2012, Neustädter was called up for the Germany squad to face the Netherlands in a friendly match five days later. He made his debut for Germany in this match as a late substitute for Schalke team-mate Lewis Holtby.

In January 2016, Neustädter met with members of the Russian Football Union in order to be able to possibly play for the Russia national team in the future. On 21 May 2016, he was called up to represent Russia at UEFA Euro 2016. On 1 June 2016, Neustädter made his debut for Russia, in a 2–1 friendly loss to the Czech Republic, as a 64th-minute substitute. He started Russia's first two games during the final tournament in France, where Russia failed to proceed through the group stage.

On 11 May 2018, he was included in Russia's extended 2018 FIFA World Cup squad. He was, however, not included in the final World Cup squad.

== Personal life ==
Neustädter's mother is ethnic Russian. Neustädter's ancestors in the paternal line were ethnic Germans who lived on territories of Russian Empire and later, USSR. Following World War II, ethnic Germans were deported by the Soviet government. Neustädter's family was forcibly relocated into Central Asia. His father is Peter Neustädter, a former Kyrgyz-born Kazakhstani footballer for Mainz 05 and former manager of Mainz 05 II. He was born in Dnipropetrovsk, Ukrainian SSR, while his father was playing for Dnipro Dnipropetrovsk. He was raised by his mother and grandparents in Kyrgyzstan, while his father was still an active football player. Due to his heritage and birth, he was eligible to represent Germany, Ukraine, Russia, Kyrgyzstan and Kazakhstan in international competitions.

On 30 May 2016, Neustädter was granted Russian citizenship, having received his new Russian passport at the Russian Consulate in Bonn.

== Career statistics ==
=== Club ===
As of match played 21 September 2024

Appearances and goals by club, season and competition
Club	Season	League			Cup (Note: Includes DFB-Pokal, Turkish Cup, Russian Cup)		Continental		Other		Total	
Club	Season	Division	Apps	Goals	Apps	Goals	Apps	Goals	Apps	Goals	Apps	Goals
Mainz 05 II	2006–07	Oberliga	31	1	—		—		5 (Note: Appearances in U19 Bundesliga)	1	36	2
Mainz 05 II	2007–08	Oberliga	25	5	—		—		—		25	5
Mainz 05 II	2008–09	Regionalliga West	10	3	—		—		—		10	3
Mainz 05 II	Total		66	9	0	0	0	0	5	1	71	10
Mainz 05	2008–09	2. Bundesliga	16	0	3	0	—		—		19	0
Borussia Mönchengladbach II	2009–10	Regionalliga West	23	3	—		—		—		23	3
Borussia Mönchengladbach	2009–10	Bundesliga	2	0	0	0	—		—		2	0
Borussia Mönchengladbach	2010–11	Bundesliga	24	1	2	0	—		2 (Note: Appearances in Bundesliga playoffs)	0	28	1
Borussia Mönchengladbach	2011–12	Bundesliga	33	0	5	0	—		—		38	0
Borussia Mönchengladbach	Total		59	1	7	0	0	0	2	0	68	1
Schalke 04	2012–13	Bundesliga	31	3	2	0	8 (Note: Appearance(s) in UEFA Champions League)	1	—		41	4
Schalke 04	2013–14	Bundesliga	32	2	3	0	9	0	—		44	2
Schalke 04	2014–15	Bundesliga	29	2	1	0	8	0	—		38	2
Schalke 04	2015–16	Bundesliga	30	0	1	0	7 (Note: Appearance(s) in UEFA Europa League)	0	—		38	0
Schalke 04	Total		122	7	7	0	32	1	0	0	161	8
Fenerbahçe	2016–17	Süper Lig	18	0	7	0	8 (Note: Three appearances in UEFA Champions League and five appearances in UEFA Europa League)	0	—		33	0
Fenerbahçe	2017–18	Süper Lig	32	3	9	0	3	2	—		44	5
Fenerbahçe	2018–19	Süper Lig	21	1	2	0	8 (Note: Two appearances in UEFA Champions League and six appearances in UEFA Europa League)	1	—		31	2
Fenerbahçe	Total		71	4	18	0	19	3	0	0	108	7
Dynamo Moscow	2019–20	Russian Premier League	20	0	1	0	—		—		21	0
Dynamo Moscow	2020–21	Russian Premier League	16	1	1	0	—		—		17	1
Dynamo Moscow	Total		36	1	2	0	0	0	0	0	38	1
Westerlo	2021–22	Challenger Pro League	2	0	0	0	—		—		2	0
Westerlo	2022-23	Jupiler Pro League	28	1	2	0	—		6 (Note: Appearances in Jupiler Pro League Europe playoffs)	0	36	1
Westerlo	2023-24	Jupiler Pro League	25	0	1	0	—		6	0	32	0
Westerlo	2024-25	Jupiler Pro League	8	0	0	0	—		0	0	8	0
Westerlo	Total		63	1	3	0	0	0	12	0	78	0
Career total			456	26	40	0	51	4	19	1	566	31

=== International ===
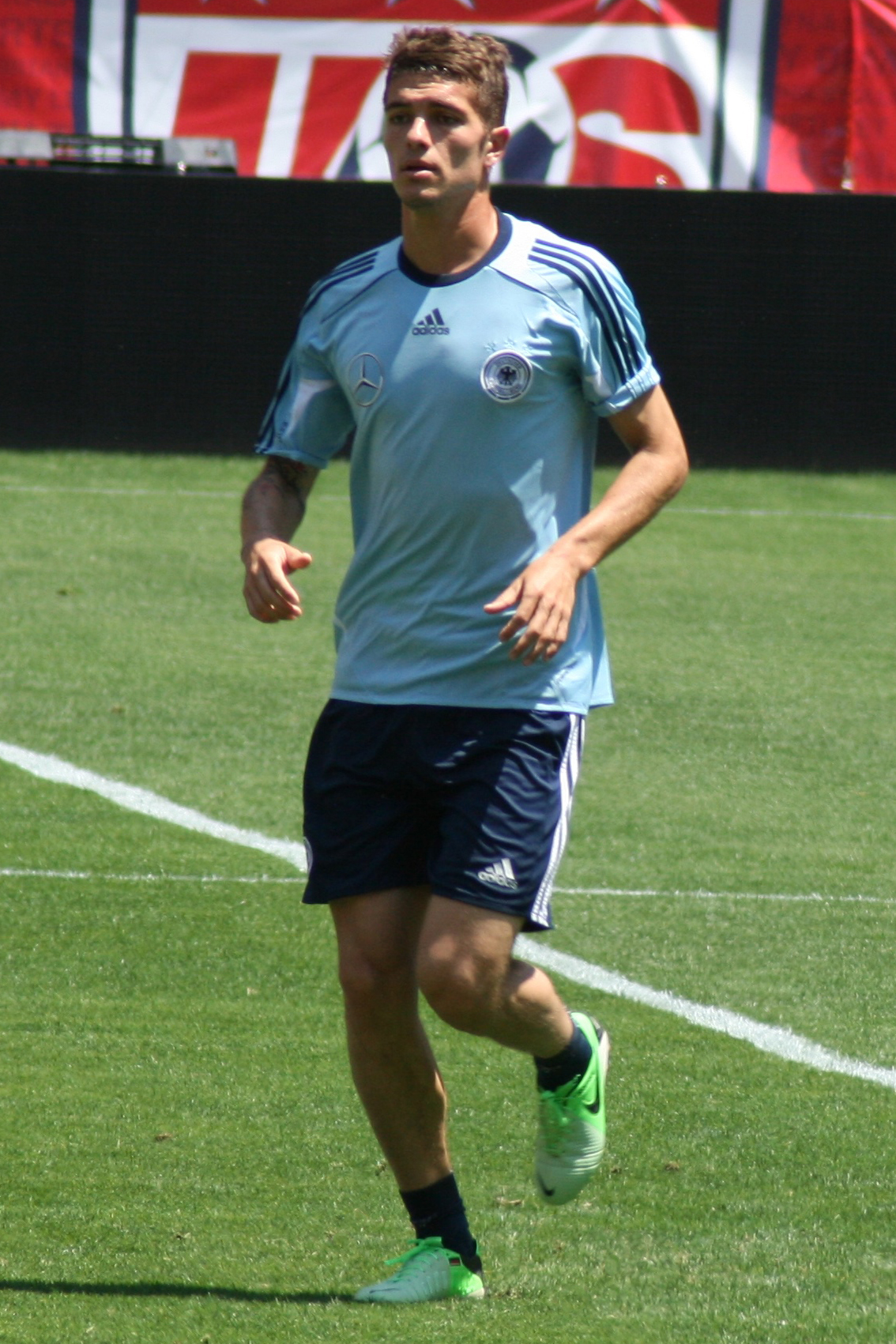
Neustädter on international duty with Germany in June 2013

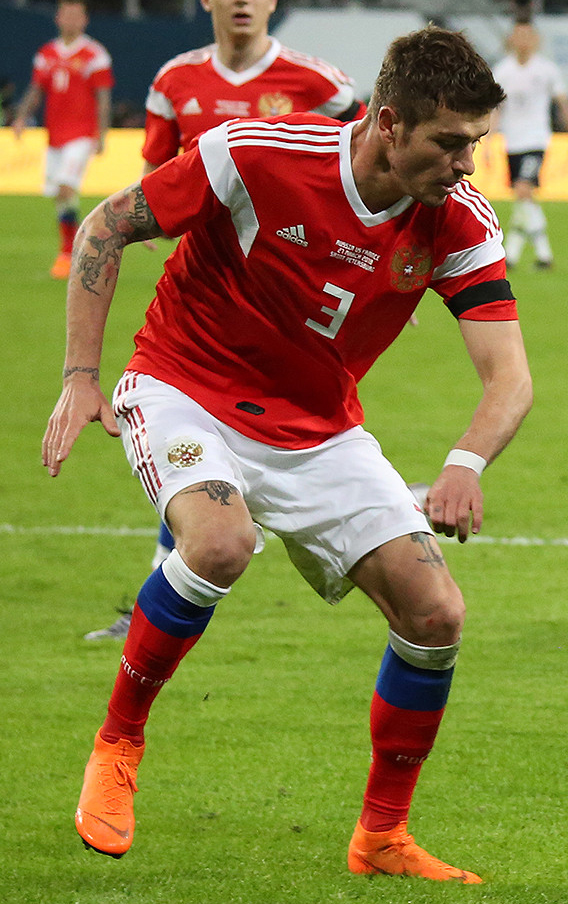
Neustädter on international duty with Russia in March 2018

Appearances and goals by national team and year
National team	Year	Apps	Goals
Germany	2012	1	0
Germany	2013	1	0
Total		2	0
Russia	2016	4	0
Russia	2017	1	0
Russia	2018	7	1
Russia	2020	1	0
Total		13	1

Scores and results list Russia's goal tally first, score column indicates score after each Neustädter goal.

List of international goals scored by Roman Neustädter
No.	Date	Venue	Opponent	Score	Result	Competition
1.	14 October 2018	Fisht Olympic Stadium, Sochi, Russia	Turkey	1–0	2–0	2018–19 UEFA Nations League B

== Honours ==
Westerlo

- Belgian First Division B: 2021–22
