= Marco Höger =

German footballer

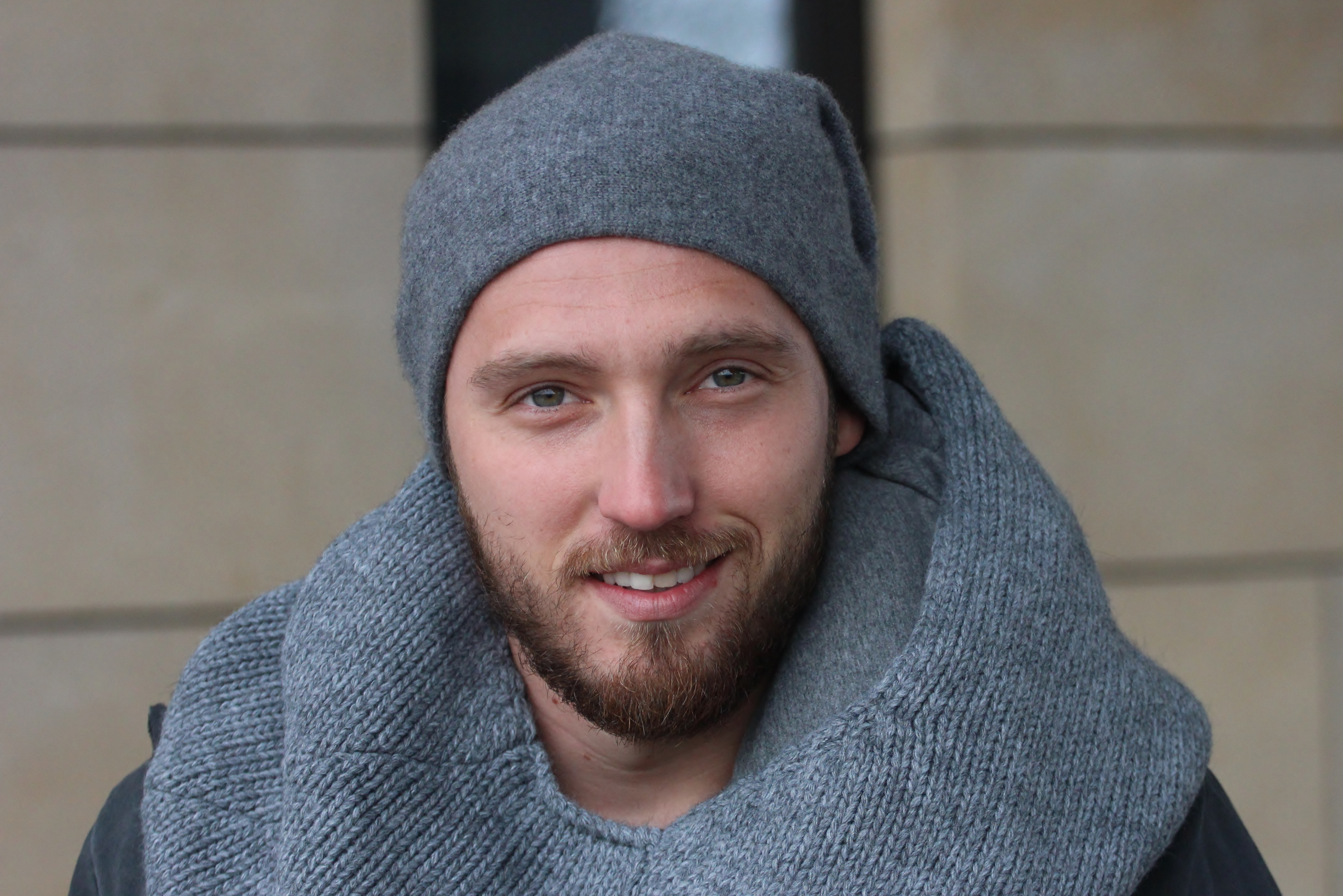
- Höger in 2015

Personal information
- Date of birth: 16 September 1989 (age 37)
- Place of birth: Cologne, West Germany
- Height: 1.82 m (6 ft 0 in)
- Positions: Midfielder; right back

Youth career
- 1994–2001: TuS Höhenhaus
- 2001–2005: Bayer Leverkusen
- 2005–2008: Alemannia Aachen

Senior career*
| Years | Team | Apps | (Gls) |
| 2008–2011 | Alemannia Aachen II | 39 | (7) |
| 2009–2011 | Alemannia Aachen | 43 | (7) |
| 2011–2016 | Schalke 04 | 88 | (7) |
| 2016–2021 | 1. FC Köln | 97 | (1) |
| 2021–2023 | Waldhof Mannheim | 44 | (2) |
| 2023–2025 | 1. FC Köln II | 53 | (2) |
| Total | | 364 | (26) |
Medal record
FC Schalke 04
| Winner | DFL-Supercup | 2011 |
- * Club domestic league appearances and goals

Marco Höger (born 16 September 1989) is a German former professional footballer who played as a midfielder or right back.

== Career ==
=== Alemannia Aachen ===
Born in Cologne, Höger began his career in 2005 in Alemannia Aachen's youth academy. In summer 2008, he was promoted to the reserve team where he earned his first senior cap on 17 August 2008 against TSV Germania Windeck in the NRW-Liga. He made his professional debut for Alemannia Aachen in the 2. Bundesliga on 6 March 2010 against FC Energie Cottbus and signed his first professional contract with Alemannia on 26 May 2010.

=== Schalke 04 ===
On 9 June 2011, FC Schalke 04 confirmed that Höger signed a three-year professional contract with them until 30 June 2014. The transfer fee is reported as undisclosed by Schalke's sport and communications manager Horst Heldt. Marco Höger was assigned a number 12 shirt, previously worn by Peer Kluge.

On 8 January 2013, Schalke announced that Höger signed a two-year professional contract extension to 30 June 2016.

Following Schalke 04's 2–0 defeat to rivals 1. FC Köln, on 10 May 2015, Höger was suspended from training and first team action until 16 May 2015.

=== 1. FC Köln ===
On 22 February 2016, Höger signed a five-year contract with 1. FC Köln starting in the 2016–17 season.

On 28 April 2018, he played as Köln lost 3–2 to SC Freiburg which confirmed Köln’s relegation from the Bundesliga.

=== Return to 1. FC Köln ===
On 7 June 2023, Höger returned to 1. FC Köln for their reserve team.

== Career statistics ==
Appearances and goals by club, season and competition
| Club | Season | League | | | DFB-Pokal | | Europe | | Other | | Total | |
| Club | Season | Division | App. | Goals | App. | Goals | App. | Goals | App. | Goals | App. | Goals |
|---|---|---|---|---|---|---|---|---|---|---|---|---|
| Alemannia Aachen II | 2008–09 | NRW-Liga | 21 | 3 | — | | — | | — | | 21 | 3 |
| Alemannia Aachen II | 2009–10 | NRW-Liga | 18 | 4 | — | | — | | — | | 18 | 4 |
| Alemannia Aachen II | Total | | 39 | 7 | — | | — | | — | | 39 | 7 |
| Alemannia Aachen | 2009–10 | 2. Bundesliga | 10 | 0 | 0 | 0 | — | | — | | 10 | 0 |
| Alemannia Aachen | 2010–11 | 2. Bundesliga | 33 | 7 | 4 | 3 | — | | — | | 37 | 10 |
| Alemannia Aachen | Total | | 43 | 7 | 4 | 3 | — | | — | | 47 | 10 |
| Schalke 04 | 2011–12 | Bundesliga | 27 | 1 | 3 | 0 | 12 (Note: Appearance(s) in UEFA Europa League) | 0 | 1 (Note: Appearance in the DFL-Supercup) | 0 | 43 | 1 |
| Schalke 04 | 2012–13 | Bundesliga | 22 | 3 | 2 | 0 | 6 (Note: Appearances in UEFA Champions League) | 0 | — | | 30 | 3 |
| Schalke 04 | 2013–14 | Bundesliga | 8 | 2 | 2 | 0 | 4 | 0 | — | | 14 | 2 |
| Schalke 04 | 2014–15 | Bundesliga | 26 | 1 | 1 | 0 | 7 | 0 | — | | 34 | 1 |
| Schalke 04 | 2015–16 | Bundesliga | 5 | 0 | 0 | 0 | 1 | 0 | — | | 6 | 0 |
| Schalke 04 | Total | | 88 | 7 | 8 | 0 | 30 | 0 | 1 | 0 | 127 | 7 |
| 1. FC Köln | 2016–17 | Bundesliga | 30 | 0 | 2 | 0 | — | | — | | 32 | 0 |
| 1. FC Köln | 2017–18 | Bundesliga | 23 | 0 | 1 | 0 | 2 | 0 | — | | 26 | 0 |
| 1. FC Köln | 2018–19 | 2. Bundesliga | 26 | 1 | 2 | 0 | — | | — | | 28 | 1 |
| 1. FC Köln | 2019–20 | Bundesliga | 15 | 0 | 1 | 0 | — | | — | | 16 | 0 |
| 1. FC Köln | 2020–21 | Bundesliga | 3 | 0 | 1 | 0 | — | | — | | 4 | 0 |
| 1. FC Köln | Total | | 97 | 1 | 7 | 0 | 2 | 0 | — | | 106 | 1 |
| Waldhof Mannheim | 2021–22 | 3. Liga | 34 | 2 | 1 | 0 | — | | 1 (Note: Appearance in Baden Cup) | 0 | 36 | 2 |
| Waldhof Mannheim | 2022–23 | 3. Liga | 10 | 0 | 1 | 0 | — | | — | | 11 | 0 |
| Waldhof Mannheim | Total | | 44 | 2 | 2 | 0 | — | | 1 | 0 | 47 | 2 |
| 1. FC Köln II | 2023–24 | Regionalliga West | 25 | 1 | — | | — | | — | | 25 | 1 |
| 1. FC Köln II | 2024–25 | Regionalliga West | 28 | 1 | — | | — | | — | | 28 | 1 |
| 1. FC Köln II | Total | | 53 | 2 | — | | — | | — | | 53 | 2 |
| Career total | | | 364 | 26 | 21 | 3 | 32 | 0 | 2 | 0 | 419 | 29 |

== Honours ==
Schalke 04

- DFL-Supercup: 2011
