= Lars Unnerstall =

German footballer (born 1990)

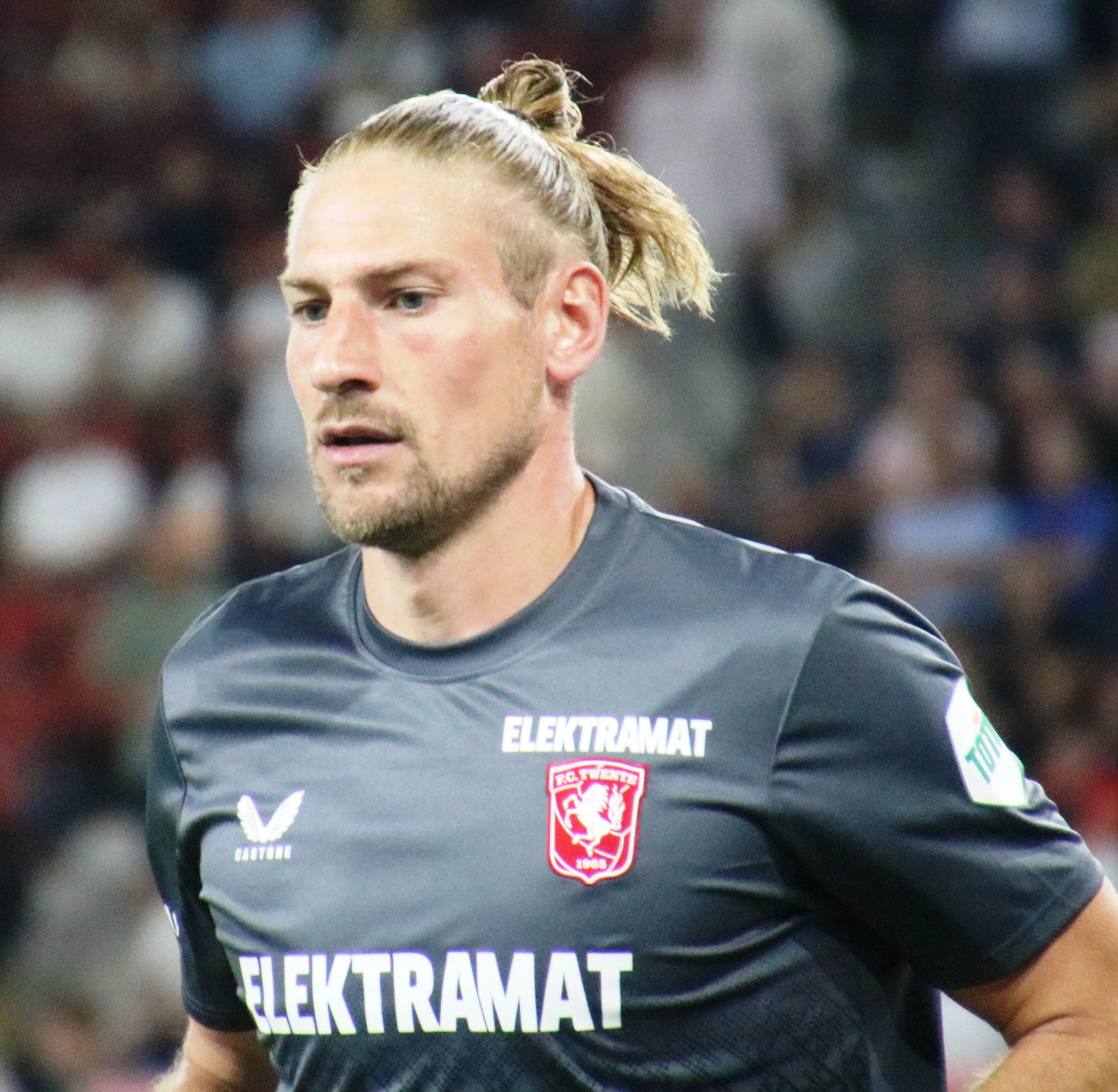
- Unnerstall with Twente in 2024

Personal information
- Full name: Lars Unnerstall
- Date of birth: 20 July 1990 (age 36)
- Place of birth: Ibbenbüren, West Germany
- Height: 1.98 m (6 ft 6 in)
- Position: Goalkeeper

Team information
- Current team: Twente
- Number: 1

Youth career
- 1994–2002: SV Uffeln
- 2002–2005: Grün-Weiß Steinbeck
- 2005–2008: Preußen Münster
- 2008–2009: Schalke 04

Senior career*
Years	Team	Apps	(Gls)
2009–2011	Schalke 04 II	54	(0)
2011–2014	Schalke 04	34	(0)
2014	→ Aarau (loan)	16	(0)
2014–2017	Fortuna Düsseldorf	10	(0)
2017–2018	VVV-Venlo	32	(0)
2018–2021	PSV	15	(0)
2018–2019	→ VVV-Venlo (loan)	33	(0)
2019–2021	Jong PSV	2	(0)
2021–	Twente	164	(0)

International career
2010	Germany U20	2	(0)
- * Club domestic league appearances and goals as of 16:30, 20 September 2026 (UTC)

Lars Unnerstall (born 20 July 1990) is a German professional footballer who plays as a goalkeeper for Eredivisie club Twente.

== Club career ==
=== Schalke 04 ===
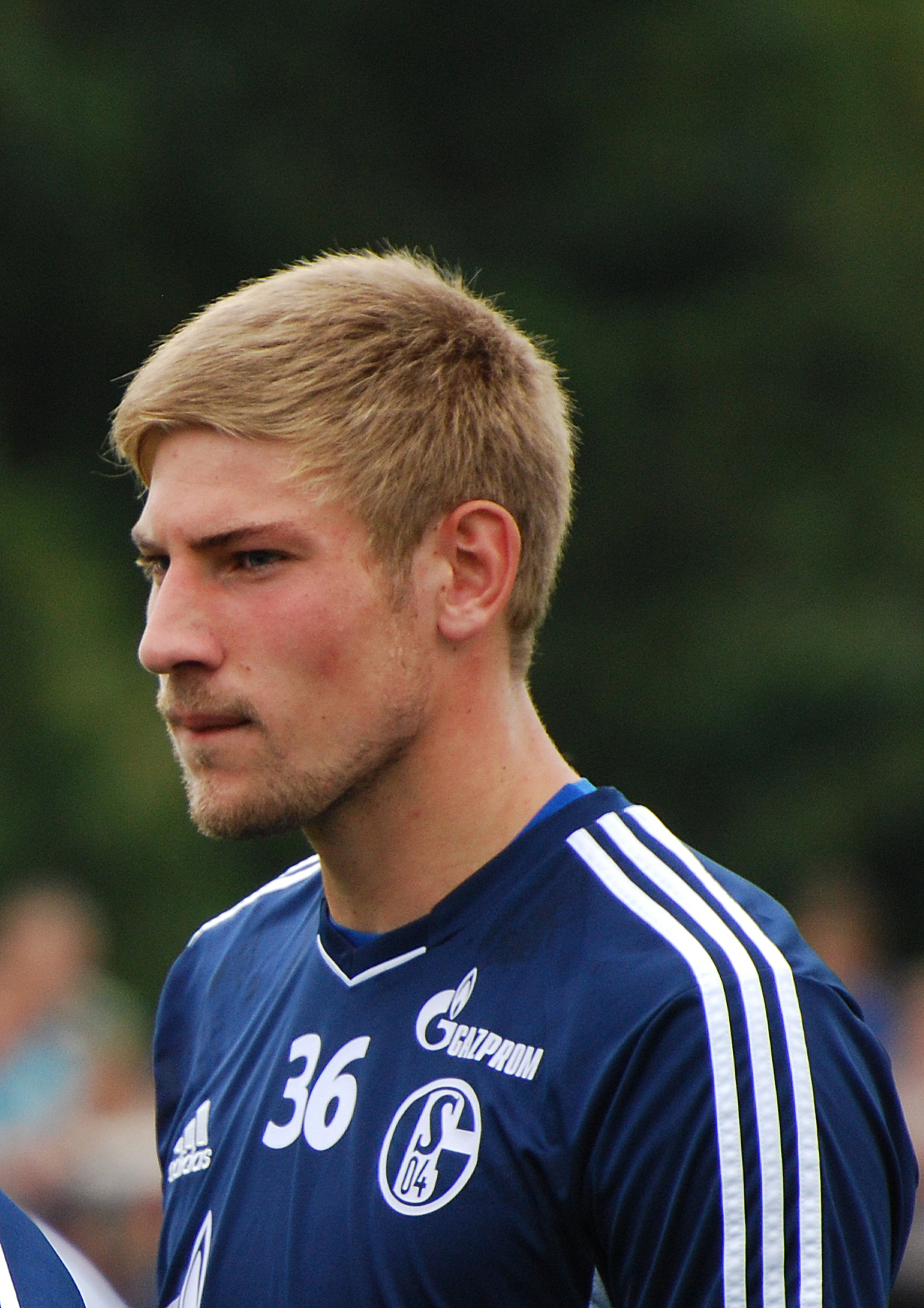
Unnerstall with Schalke 04 in 2011

Born in Ibbenbüren, North Rhine-Westphalia, Unnerstall finished his development at FC Schalke 04 after joining at the age of 18. In April 2010, after featuring regularly for the B team, he signed a professional contract until 2012.

For the 2011–12 season, coach Ralf Rangnick announced Unnerstall as second-choice behind Ralf Fährmann. His professional debut took place on 31 July 2011, in an 11–1 away win against FC Teningen in the first round of the DFB-Pokal. In October, he agreed to an extension until June 2013.

On 15 October 2011, after Fährmann's ejection early in the game, Unnerstall made his Bundesliga debut, in an eventual 1–2 home defeat to 1. FC Kaiserslautern. After it was revealed the former had suffered a serious cruciate ligament injury he became the starter, remaining as such even after the signing of veteran Timo Hildebrand and earning praise from manager Huub Stevens.

Unnerstall agreed to a new deal until 2015 before the 2012–13 campaign started. He continued to battle with Hildebrand for starting duties, and was also first choice during the team's run in the UEFA Champions League; he also committed several mistakes in home matches, which led to fan criticism.

During the 2013 off-season, Unnerstall was linked a move away from the club. Nothing came of it, however, and he remained as third-choice behind Fährmann and Hildebrand.

On 24 January 2014, Unnerstall was loaned to Swiss Super League side FC Aarau. His first match took place eight days later, in a 1–1 draw against FC St. Gallen; he was later chosen Player of the Month for this display.

=== Fortuna Düsseldorf ===
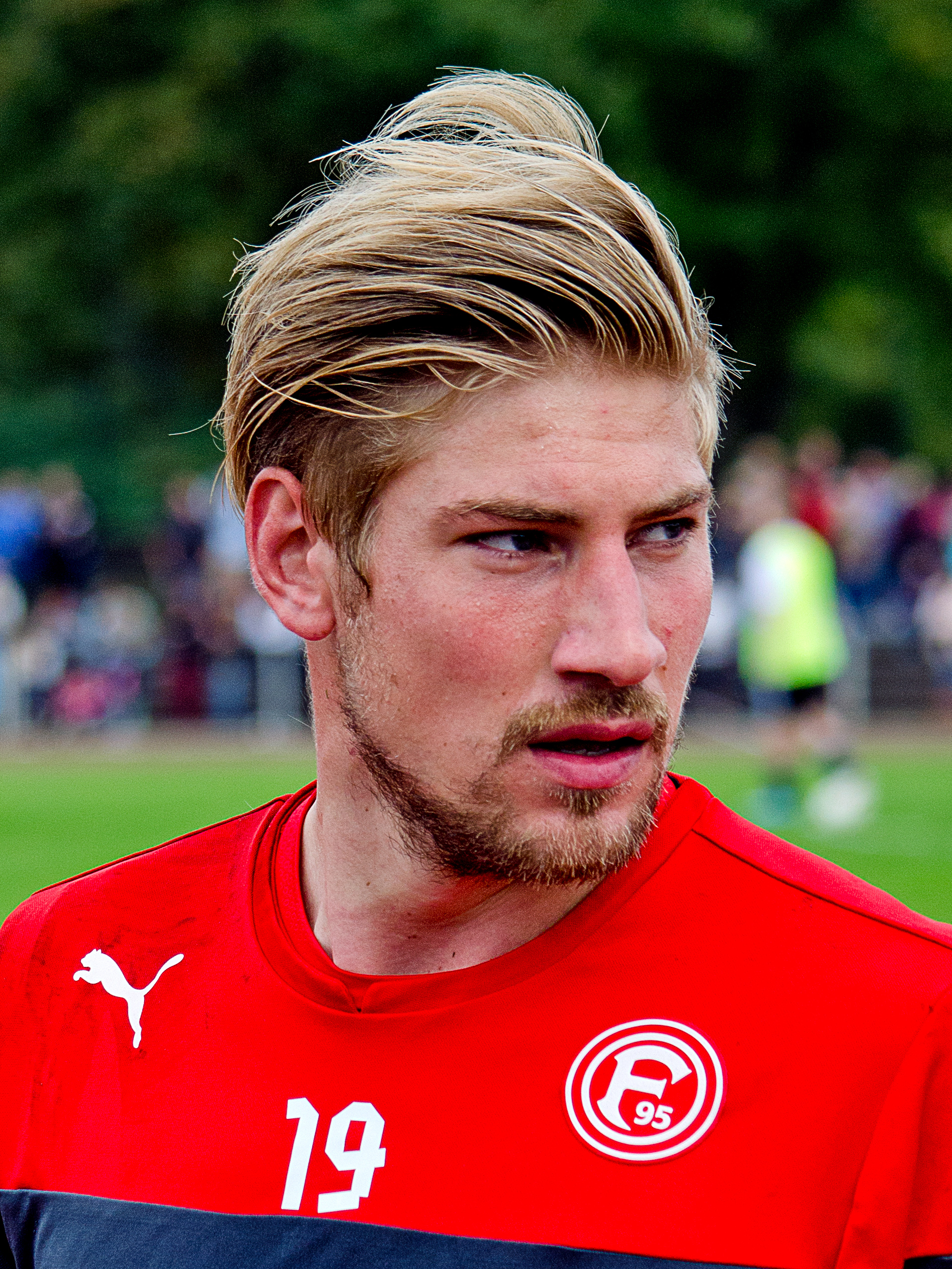
Unnerstall as a Fortuna Düsseldorf player (2014)

On 21 May 2014, Unnerstall joined Fortuna Düsseldorf as a replacement for Fabian Giefer, for a reported fee of €250,000. He spent most of his tenure as backup to Michael Rensing, featuring rarely in the 2. Bundesliga and adding two appearances in the 2015–16 edition of the domestic cup.

Increasingly frustrated with his lack of playing time, and occasionally demoted to the reserves, Unnerstall was also afflicted with pneumonia in early 2017.

=== VVV and PSV ===
Unnerstall signed a two-year deal with VVV-Venlo in June 2017, for an undisclosed fee. On 18 May of the following year he agreed to a three-year contract at fellow Eredivisie team PSV Eindhoven, being immediately loaned to his previous club.

After a series of poor performances from regular starter Jeroen Zoet in autumn 2019, Unnerstall became first choice for PSV. He finished the season with 14 league appearances.

In the 2020–21 campaign, however, Mark van Bommel's successor Roger Schmidt preferred the newly recruited Yvon Mvogo, and Unnerstall was demoted to backup once again. Due to a tight schedule in the autumn of 2020, he played the full match against Sparta Rotterdam on 29 November, a 1–0 win.

=== Twente ===
On 2 March 2021, Unnerstall agreed to join FC Twente also of the Dutch top division as of 1 July.

== International career ==
In September 2010, Unnerstall was called by the German under-20 team, featuring against Switzerland and Poland the following month. On 31 August 2011 he was selected to the under-21s, but did not appear in any games with the latter.

== Career statistics ==
As of match played on 20 September 2026

Appearances and goals by club, season and competition
Club	Season	League			Cup		Europe		Other		Total	
Club	Season	Division	Apps	Goals	Apps	Goals	Apps	Goals	Apps	Goals	Apps	Goals
Schalke 04	2010–11	Bundesliga	0	0	0	0	0	0	–		0	0
Schalke 04	2011–12	Bundesliga	21	0	3	0	5 (Note: Appearances in UEFA Europa League)	0	–		29	0
Schalke 04	2012–13	Bundesliga	13	0	0	0	5 (Note: Appearances in UEFA Champions League)	0	–		18	0
Schalke 04	2013–14	Bundesliga	0	0	0	0	0	0	0	0	0	0
Schalke 04	Total		34	0	3	0	10	0	–		47	0
Aarau	2013–14	Swiss Super League	16	0	0	0	–		–		16	0
Fortuna Düsseldorf	2014–15	2. Bundesliga	10	0	0	0	–		–		10	0
Fortuna Düsseldorf	2015–16	2. Bundesliga	0	0	2	0	–		–		2	0
Fortuna Düsseldorf	2016–17	2. Bundesliga	0	0	0	0	–		–		0	0
Fortuna Düsseldorf	Total		10	0	2	0	–		–		12	0
VVV-Venlo	2017–18	Eredivisie	32	0	0	0	–		–		32	0
VVV-Venlo	2018–19	Eredivisie	33	0	1	0	–		–		34	0
VVV-Venlo	Total		65	0	1	0	–		–		66	0
PSV	2019–20	Eredivisie	14	0	2	0	2	0	–		18	0
PSV	2020–21	Eredivisie	1	0	3	0	0	0	–		4	0
PSV	Total		15	0	5	0	2	0	–		22	0
Twente	2021–22	Eredivisie	32	0	3	0	–		–		35	0
Twente	2022–23	Eredivisie	33	0	2	0	4 (Note: Appearances in UEFA Europa Conference League)	0	4 (Note: Appearances in Eredivisie European competition play-offs)	0	43	0
Twente	2023–24	Eredivisie	32	0	1	0	6	0	–		39	0
Twente	2024–25	Eredivisie	31	0	2	0	9	0	–		42	0
Twente	2025–26	Eredivisie	31	0	4	0	–		–		35	0
Twente	2026–27	Eredivisie	6	0	0	0	5 (Note: Two appearances in UEFA Europa League, three appearances in UEFA Conference League)	0	–		11	0
Twente	Total		165	0	12	0	24	0	4	0	205	0
Career total			305	0	23	0	36	0	4	0	368	0

== Honours ==
Schalke 04

- DFL-Supercup: 2011

Individual

- Eredivisie Team of the Month: November 2021, May 2023
