= René Klingenburg =

German footballer

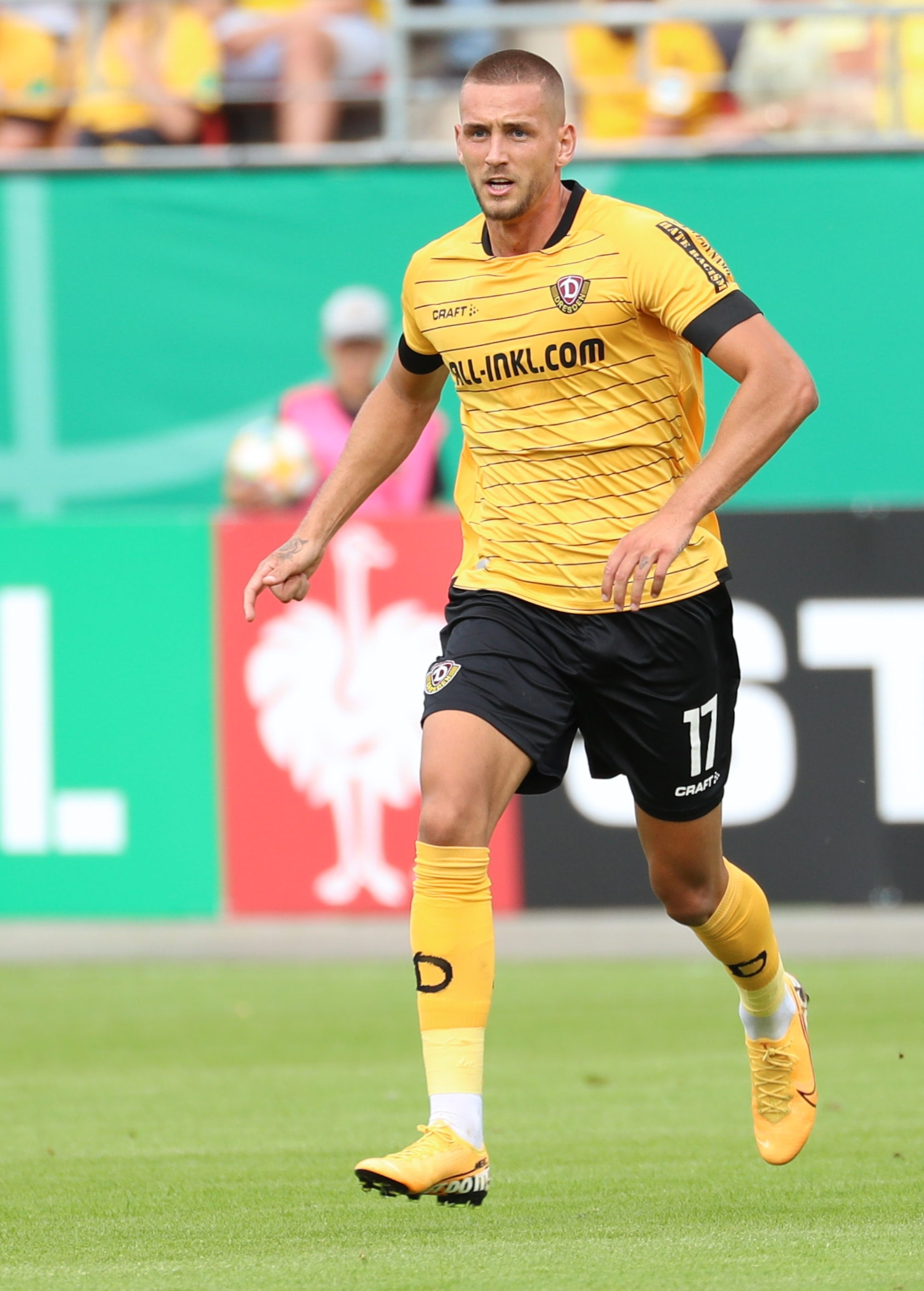
- Klingenburg in 2019

Personal information
- Date of birth: 29 December 1993 (age 32)
- Place of birth: Oberhausen, Germany
- Height: 1.90 m (6 ft 3 in)
- Position: Midfielder

Youth career
- 1997–2004: Post SV Oberhausen
- 2004–2008: Rot-Weiß Oberhausen
- 2008–2010: MSV Duisburg
- 2010–2012: Schalke 04

Senior career*
Years	Team	Apps	(Gls)
2012–2015	Schalke 04 II	58	(5)
2012–2014	Schalke 04	0	(0)
2015–2016	Viktoria Köln	35	(4)
2016–2017	Rot Weiss Ahlen	17	(0)
2017–2018	Schalke 04 II	35	(5)
2018–2019	Preußen Münster	34	(9)
2019–2020	Dynamo Dresden	25	(0)
2020–2021	Viktoria Köln	19	(1)
2021–2023	1. FC Kaiserslautern	29	(2)
- * Club domestic league appearances and goals as of 5 July 2023

René Klingenburg (born 29 December 1993) is a German professional footballer who plays as a midfielder.

== Career ==
Born in Oberhausen, Klingenburg signed his first professional contract with Schalke 04 in December 2012. In January 2015, Klingenburg joined Viktoria Köln on a contract until 2016. Klingenburg then joined Rot Weiss Ahlen in the summer of 2016, before returning to Schalke in January 2017. He joined Preußen Münster on a one-year contract ahead of the 2018–19 season. On 27 May 2019, Klingenburg joined Dynamo Dresden on a three-year contract ahead of the upcoming 2019–20 season.
