= Christoph Moritz =

German footballer

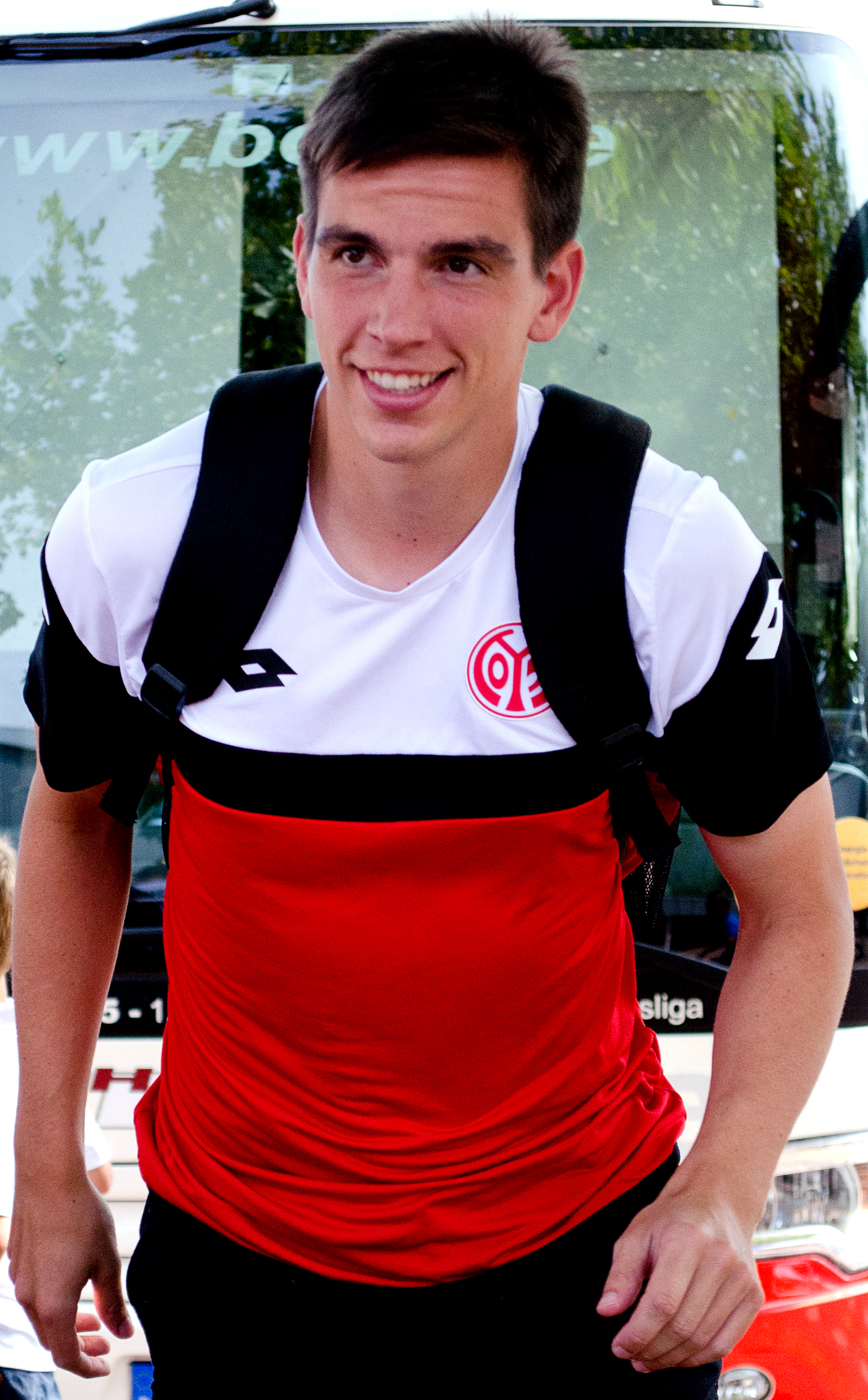
- Moritz in 2015

Personal information
- Date of birth: 27 January 1990 (age 36)
- Place of birth: Düren, West Germany
- Height: 1.86 m (6 ft 1 in)
- Position: Defensive midfielder

Youth career
- 1994–2006: FC Viktoria 08 Arnoldsweiler
- 2006–2009: Alemannia Aachen

Senior career*
Years	Team	Apps	(Gls)
2008–2009	Alemannia Aachen II	2	(0)
2009–2013	Schalke 04	54	(1)
2011–2013	Schalke 04 II	9	(0)
2013–2016	Mainz 05	42	(2)
2013–2016	→ Mainz 05 II	4	(1)
2016–2018	1. FC Kaiserslautern	59	(5)
2018–2020	Hamburger SV	20	(0)
2018–2020	Hamburger SV II	2	(0)
2019	→ Darmstadt 98 (loan)	11	(1)
2020–2022	Jahn Regensburg	27	(0)

International career
2009–2010	Germany U20	3	(1)
2010–2013	Germany U21	7	(0)
- * Club domestic league appearances and goals as of 22:20, 22 July 2022 (UTC)

Christoph Moritz (born 27 January 1990) is a German professional footballer. He plays as a defensive midfielder.

== Career ==
Moritz began his footballing career in 1994, at the age of four, as a youth player with FC Viktoria 08 Arnoldsweiler. He stayed here for twelve years before moving to Alemannia Aachen. After three years with the youth and reserve teams, he signed for Schalke 04 in July 2009 where he started his professional career. Moritz's first professional match was in the Bundesliga on 8 August 2009 against 1. FC Nürnberg and scored his first goal on 16 August 2009. Moritz signed his first professional contract on 18 January 2010 with Schalke 04. The contract ran until 30 June 2013.

Upon expiration of his contract with Schalke he joined Mainz 05 on a contract until 30 June 2017.

In May 2018, following 1. FC Kaiserslautern's relegation from the 2. Bundesliga, Moritz' move to Hamburger SV, newly relegated to the 2. Bundesliga, was announced. He agreed a contract until 2020.

In September 2020, Moritz signed for Jahn Regensburg.

== Honours ==
Schalke 04

- DFB-Pokal: 2010–11
