= Hummel =

Hummel may refer to:

== People ==
- Hummel (surname), origin and list of people with the surname Hummel

== Companies ==
- Hummel International, a German founded-Denmark-based sporting goods and apparel company
- Hummel figurines
- Hummel Aviation, American aircraft manufacturer based in Bryan, Ohio
  - Hummel Ultracruiser, an American amateur-built aircraft
  - Hummel Bird, an American amateur-built aircraft

== Geography ==
- Lordship of Hummel, historic landscape zone, now in Silesia, Poland
- Hummel Field, a public use airport in Middlesex County, Virginia, United States
- Hummel, Kentucky, a community in the United States
- Mount Hummel, a summit of Grant Island, off the coast of Marie Byrd Land, Antarctica
- Hümmel, municipality in the district of Ahrweiler, in Rhineland-Palatinate, Germany

== Other ==
- Hummels, an alien species in the Ron Goulart novel Shaggy Planet
- Hummel (instrument), a musical instrument
- Siebel Si 202 Hummel, a German light sportsplane of the late 1930s
- Hummel, a male morph of red deer with no antlers, also known as a nott
- Hummel, a name for dehulled barley grain; the process was called hummelling and mechanical devices used for this process were originally known as barley hummellers (now called hullers)
- Hummel (vehicle), a German self-propelled 15-cm howitzer used in World War II

== See also ==
- Mats Hummels (born 1988), German footballer
- Hummels Wharf, Pennsylvania
- Hummelstown, Pennsylvania, a town named after its founders, Frederick and Rosina Hummel
