= Roundstone =

Roundstone may refer to:

== Australia ==
- Roundstone, Queensland, a locality in the Shire of Banana, Australia

== Ireland ==
- Roundstone, County Galway, a village in the Republic of Ireland

== United Kingdom ==
- Roundstone, West Sussex, a village in England
- Roundstone Music, an English rock band

== United States ==
- Roundstone, Kentucky, an unincorporated community
- Roundstone Creek, a stream in Kentucky
