= Hummel, Kentucky =

Unincorporated community in Rockcastle County, Kentucky, United States

Hummel
- Unincorporated community
- Location within Kentucky Location within the United States
- Coordinates: 37°23′47″N 84°17′07″W
- Country: United States
- State: Kentucky
- County: Rockcastle
- Elevation: 1,056 ft (322 m)
- Time zone: UTC-5 (Eastern (EST))
  - Summer (DST): UTC-4 (EDT)
- ZIP code: 38530
- Area code: 606
- GNIS feature ID: 512847

Hummel (often pronounced Humble) is an unincorporated community in Rockcastle County, Kentucky, United States. The community is accessed from Kentucky Route 1786 (Wildie Road) or U.S. Route 25 via Hummel Road.

== Geography ==
Hummel has an elevation of 1,065 ft (325 m). Roundstone Creek passes through the community.
