= Mats Hummels =

German footballer (born 1988)

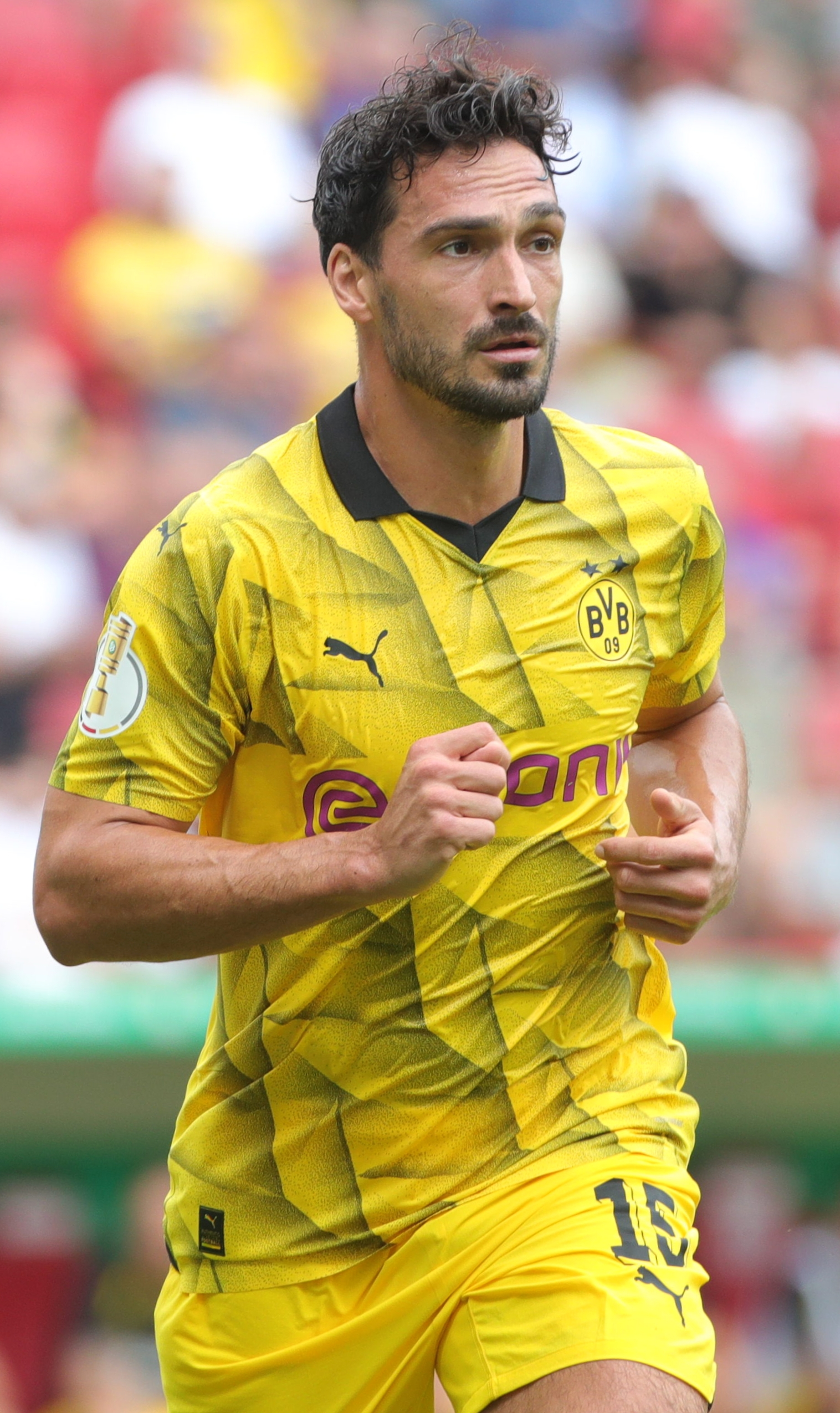
- Hummels playing for Borussia Dortmund in 2023

Personal information
- Full name: Mats Julian Hummels
- Date of birth: 16 December 1988 (age 37)
- Place of birth: Bergisch Gladbach, West Germany
- Height: 1.91 m (6 ft 3 in)
- Position: Centre-back

Youth career
- 1995–2006: Bayern Munich

Senior career*
Years	Team	Apps	(Gls)
2006–2007	Bayern Munich II	42	(5)
2007–2009	Bayern Munich	1	(0)
2008–2009	→ Borussia Dortmund (loan)	13	(1)
2009–2016	Borussia Dortmund	212	(18)
2016–2019	Bayern Munich	74	(3)
2019–2024	Borussia Dortmund	142	(11)
2024–2025	Roma	14	(0)
Total		498	(38)

International career
2007	Germany U20	1	(0)
2007–2010	Germany U21	21	(5)
2010–2023	Germany	78	(5)
Medal record
Men's football
Representing Germany
FIFA World Cup
Winner	2014 Brazil	Team
UEFA European Championship
Bronze medal – third place	2012 Poland–Ukraine	Team
UEFA European Under-21 Championship
Winner	2009 Sweden	Team
- * Club domestic league appearances and goals

Mats Julian Hummels (German pronunciation: [ˈmats ˈhʊml̩s]; born 16 December 1988) is a German former professional footballer who played as a centre-back. Considered one of the best defenders of his generation, he was known for his tackling, anticipation, goal scoring ability and deadly crosses.

Hummels came through the Bayern Munich youth academy before joining Borussia Dortmund on loan in January 2008, and officially signing for Dortmund in February 2009 for €4 million. He rejoined Bayern in 2016 for an undisclosed fee, and was sold back to Dortmund three years later, having won the Bundesliga in all his seasons in Munich. Hummels made over 500 total appearances for Dortmund, winning the Bundesliga and the DFB-Pokal twice, as well as finishing runner-up in the UEFA Champions League in 2013 and 2024. After a season in Italy with Roma, he announced his retirement from football in 2025.

Hummels was part of the Germany national team from 2010 to 2023, earning over 70 caps. He represented the nation at the FIFA World Cup in 2014 and 2018, winning the former edition, and at the UEFA European Championship in 2012, 2016 and 2020.

== Club career ==
=== Bayern Munich: Youth, and 2006–2008 ===
Hummels is a product of Bayern Munich's youth academy, first entering the club as a six-year-old. He signed his first professional contract on 19 December 2006, until 2010. On 19 May 2007, in the season's final match, he played his first Bundesliga match with the first team in a 5–2 home routing of 1. FSV Mainz 05. He also played for the reserve team. In 42 Regionalliga matches Hummels scored five goals for FC Bayern II.

=== Borussia Dortmund: 2008–2016 ===
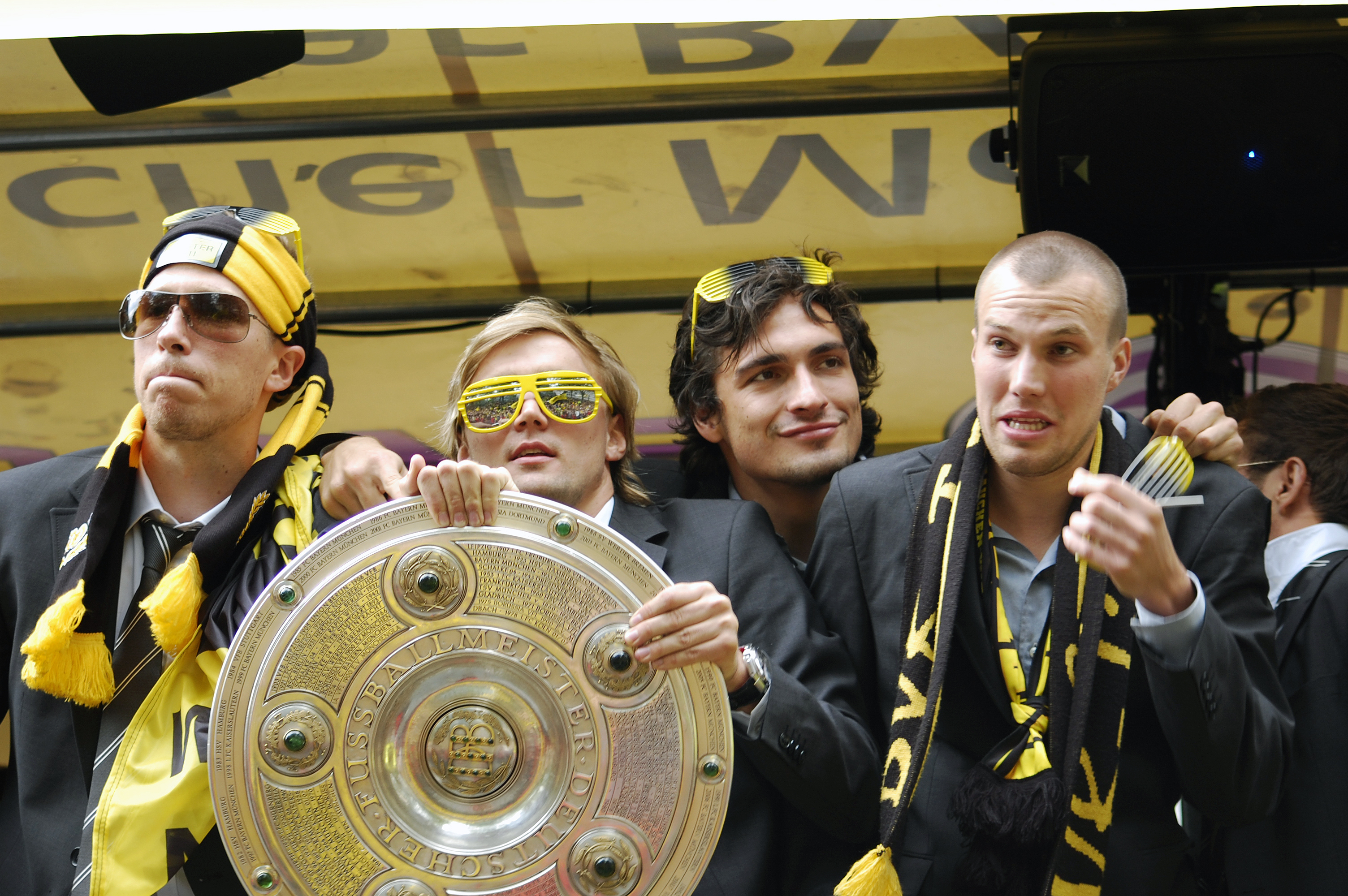
Borussia Dortmund players (from left to right: Marco Stiepermann, Marcel Schmelzer, Hummels and Kevin Großkreutz) celebrate winning the Bundesliga in 2012.

In January 2008, Hummels joined Borussia Dortmund, initially on loan. He finished the 2007–08 season with 16 matches played. During his first full season, he quickly established himself as first-choice, as he often partnered newly signed Neven Subotić, but also missed a great part of its final months due to injury. By the end of the 2007–08 season he would lose his first final with Dortmund in a 1–2 loss against his lender club Bayern Munich in the DFB-Pokal final. In February 2009, he was fully signed to the club for a fee of €4 million. In the summer of 2008, he would win his first trophy with Borussia Dortmund in a German supercup match between Dortmund and Bayern Munich, which Dortmund won by 2–1.

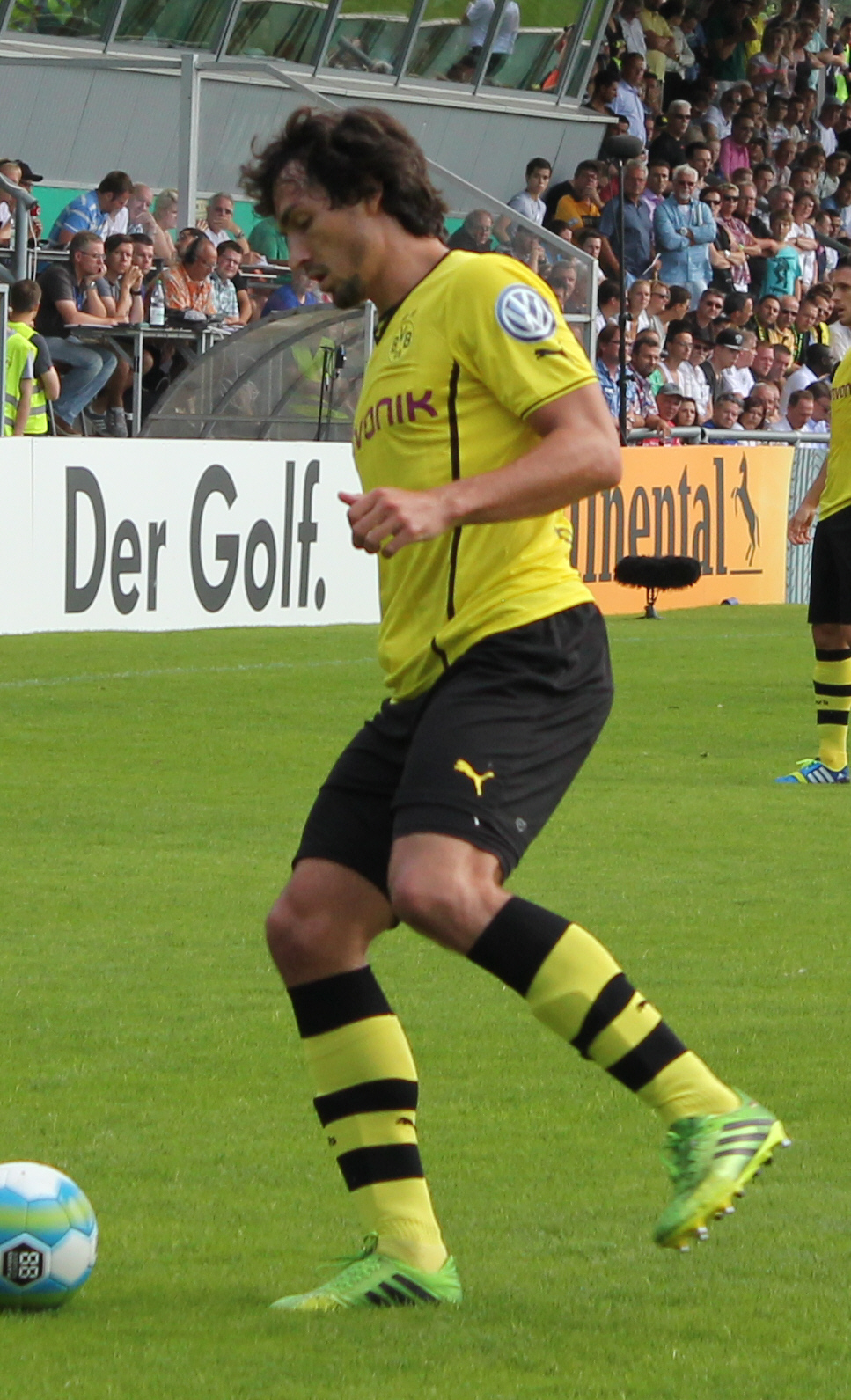
Hummels in action for Borussia Dortmund in 2013

The 2010–11 season brought increased success for Hummels. He was the regular first-choice centre-back, again paired with Subotić. The duo helped Dortmund to the best defensive record in the Bundesliga, as the team won the league title. Hummels' performances that season displayed great quality in tackling, positioning, passing and composure.

In the 2011–12 season Hummels lost the DFL-Supercup against rivals FC Schalke 04 after penalties.

Nonetheless, Hummels won the Bundesliga for a second time in 2011–12 as Dortmund set a Bundesliga record with the most points in a Bundesliga season with 81 points. Hummels scored a goal in Dortmund's 5–2 win against Bayern in the 2012 DFB-Pokal Final as the team completed the league and cup double. On 3 June 2012, Hummels signed a new contract to remain at Dortmund. In that season he would score his first goal in the UEFA Champions League, a penalty against Olympique Marseille in a group stage match to make it 2–0.

In 2012, he would lose the DFL-Supercup final once more with 2–1 against Bayern Munich.

Hummels scored his second Champions League goal in the first leg of the round of 16 in the 2012–13 edition of the competition, equalizing late by header against Shakhtar Donetsk.

On 25 May 2013, Hummels was in the Borussia Dortmund line-up that was defeated 2–1 by Bayern Munich last-minute at Wembley Stadium, London, in the 2013 UEFA Champions League Final.

On 27 July 2013, Hummels was in the Borussia Dortmund line-up that won 4–2 against Bayern Munich to win his first official DFL-Supercup. A year later, on 13 August 2014 he went on to win his second DFL-Supercup in a 2–0 victory over Bayern Munich after losing the DFB-Pokal final with 2–0 against Bayern Munich three months prior.

By the end of the season Hummels reached the 2015 DFB-Pokal final after a win against Bayern Munich by penalties in the semifinal. Borussia Dortmund would go on to lose the final 1–3 against Bundesliga runners-up VfL Wolfsburg.

Hummels finished his Borussia Dortmund season with two goals in 32 matches played in the 2014–15 season and three goals in 50 matches played during the 2015–16 season.

With Borussia Dortmund he would reach the UEFA Europa League quarterfinals that season - almost reaching the semis after a last-minute 3–4 defeat at Anfield road after leading the second leg match twice by two goals. He'd score in the first leg against Liverpool and register an assist in the second leg.

He played for Dortmund in the 2016 DFB-Pokal final against Bayern Munich shortly after having confirmed that he would join Bayern for the following season. After the game, which Dortmund lost on penalties, coach Thomas Tuchel publicly criticised the player. Hummels had asked to be substituted during the game, due to a torn calf muscle.

=== Return to Bayern Munich ===
==== 2016–17 season ====
On 10 May 2016, it was confirmed that Hummels would re-join Bayern Munich from 1 July, signing a five-year contract. The fee was undisclosed, with the BBC citing reports that it was £30 million. He made his debut for Bayern on 14 August 2016 in the DFL-Supercup against his old team Dortmund which his team won with 2–0. On 20 August, Hummels scored his first goal for the club in a 5–0 victory over Carl Zeiss Jena during the first round of the DFB-Pokal. On 26 November, Hummels scored his first league goal for the club in a 2–1 win over Bayer Leverkusen. On 24 September, Hummels suffered a knee injury in his right knee just before half time and was subbed off in a 1–0 victory over Hamburger SV. He made his comeback as a substitute in the second half in a 1–0 defeat to Atlético Madrid on 29 September.

On 9 April 2017, Hummels missed the Champions League quarter-final first leg against Real Madrid after sustaining an ankle injury in training. He did not fully recover from the injury and had to play the second leg against Real Madrid as defender. Javi Martínez was shown a red card in the first leg and there was no more backup player in centre-back position; the match ended 4–2 defeat for his side as they got knocked out from the competition. On 26 April, Hummels scored a goal against his former club Borussia Dortmund in a 2–3 loss in the DFB-Pokal semi-final. Hummels would play alongside Germany teammate Jérôme Boateng throughout the season. Hummels finished the 2016–17 season with three goals in 42 matches played.

During this time, Hummels was a part of a collaboration between the German Football Association and The LEGO Group, who in May 2016 released a Europe-exclusive collectible minifigure series, with Hummels featured as the fourth of sixteen minifigures in the collection.

==== 2017–18 season ====
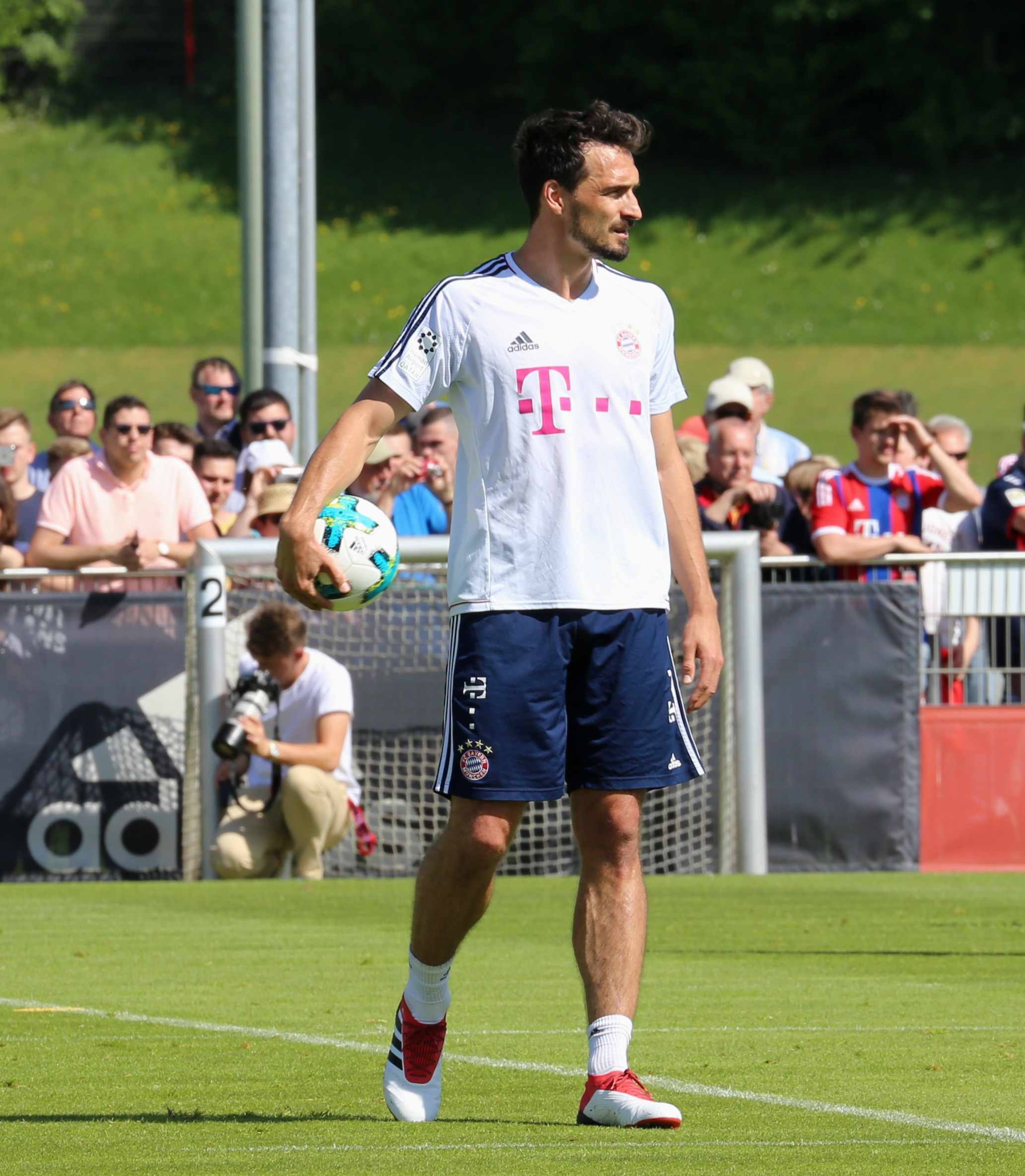
Hummels with Bayern Munich in 2018

On 5 August 2017, Hummels started the season in fashion by defeating Borussia Dortmund to win the DFL-Supercup in the penalty-shootout as the match ended 2–2 after extra time. He scored his first goal of the season in a 5–0 victory over Chemnitzer FC in the DFB-Pokal first-round on 12 August. On 1 October, Hummels scored a goal in a 2–2 draw over Hertha BSC. On 18 October, he scored his first Champions League goal for the club and his third goal in the competition in a 3–0 victory over Celtic. Hummels sustained an adductor injury at Bayern's training camp in Doha during the winter break which forced him to miss the league match against Bayer 04 Leverkusen. On 2 February, Hummels played his first match of the year after recovering from the injury in a 2–0 victory over Mainz 05. On 31 March, he made his 50th league appearance for Bayern Munich in a 6–0 victory over Borussia Dortmund. On 28 April, Hummels captained his side for the first time in a 4–1 victory over Eintracht Frankfurt. Hummels finished the 2017–18 season with three goals in 41 matches played.

==== 2018–19 season ====
Hummels started the 2018–19 season by starting in the DFL-Supercup, which Bayern won 5–0 against Eintracht Frankfurt.

Hummels had a difficult spell midway through the season as he lost his starting place for several matches to Niklas Süle. Hummels was criticized for his comments after the 3–2 loss against Dortmund on 10 November 2018. Hummels blamed his poor performance on him being sick. Hummels said he had blurred vision before the match but he still decided to play the match. Hummels had to be substituted in the second half because of his poor performance.

On 2 October 2018, he would score his second goal for Bayern Munich in the UEFA Champions League and his fourth goal in the entire competition, against Ajax Amsterdam with an early header in the group stage.

On 18 May 2019, Hummels won his fifth Bundesliga title as Bayern finished two points above Dortmund with 78 points. A week later, Hummels won his second DFB-Pokal as Bayern defeated RB Leipzig 3–0 in the 2019 DFB-Pokal Final.

Hummels finished the 2018–19 season with two goals in 33 matches played.

=== Return to Dortmund ===
On 19 June 2019, Bayern Munich came to an agreement with Borussia Dortmund that would see the 30-year-old Hummels rejoin his former club. His team would go on to win the 2019's edition of the DFL-Supercup by 2–0 against Bayern Munich – although he remained unused in that match. He clinched his first title following his return by achieving the 2020–21 DFB-Pokal after a 4–1 win over RB Leipzig in the final. On 19 February 2023, he featured in his 454th match in a 4–1 win over Hertha BSC, becoming the player with the second most appearances at the club ahead of Roman Weidenfeller, with only Michael Zorc with 572 games ahead of him. Later that year, on 24 May, he extended his contract with the club until 2024. Hummels would almost win his third German championship with Borussia Dortmund - and his sixth German championship in total, after merely drawing on the last matchday of the 2022–23 Bundesliga in a 2–2 against Mainz. Bayern Munich would win the league by goal-difference after a last-minute winner by Jamal Musiala against Köln.

On 10 April 2024, Hummels played his 500th match for Borussia Dortmund in all competitions against Atlético Madrid during the Champions League quarter-finals. A week later he assisted Julian Brandt's goal in the second leg match against Atlético Madrid to tie the game on aggregate. A month later, on 7 May, he scored the only goal and his fifth Champions League goal of his career from a header in a 1–0 away victory over Paris Saint-Germain in the Champions League semi-final second leg, becoming the oldest German player, aged 35 years and 143 days, to score in the knockout stages of the competition, and securing his club's qualification to the final for the third time in their history. Hummels was given the man of the match award in both games against PSG. Afterwards, his club lost 2–0 against Real Madrid in the final, once again in Wembley. However, he became the second player to produce more than 50 tackles in a single campaign, following Lúcio in 2009–10. He won the man of the match award three times that season, after a 3–1 victory over Milan in the group stage as well as twice in the semis against Paris Saint-Germain (2–0 on aggregate) becoming the player with the most MOTM-awards in the 2023–24 UEFA Champions League campaign. He was eventually named in the Team of the Season in that competition often playing alongside fellow centre-backs Nico Schlotterbeck and former Bayern teammate Niklas Süle throughout the campaign. A few weeks later, on 14 June, his departure from the club was announced.

=== Roma ===
On 4 September 2024, Hummels left Germany for the first time in his career and signed for Italian club Roma as a free agent on a one-year deal. On 27 October, he made his debut as a substitute, scoring an own goal in a 5–1 away defeat to Fiorentina.

Hummels started his first game for Roma in the fifth matchday of the UEFA Europa League on 28 November in a 2–2 away draw against Tottenham Hotspur, in which he also scored his first and only goal for Roma in stoppage time to save a point for his team.

On 4 April 2025, Hummels announced that he would retire from professional football at the end of the 2024–25 season. On 10 August, he returned to Borussia Dortmund for a farewell, playing 19 minutes in a friendly against Juventus, before doing a lap of honour and receiving a standing ovation from the crowd after the end of the match.

== International career ==
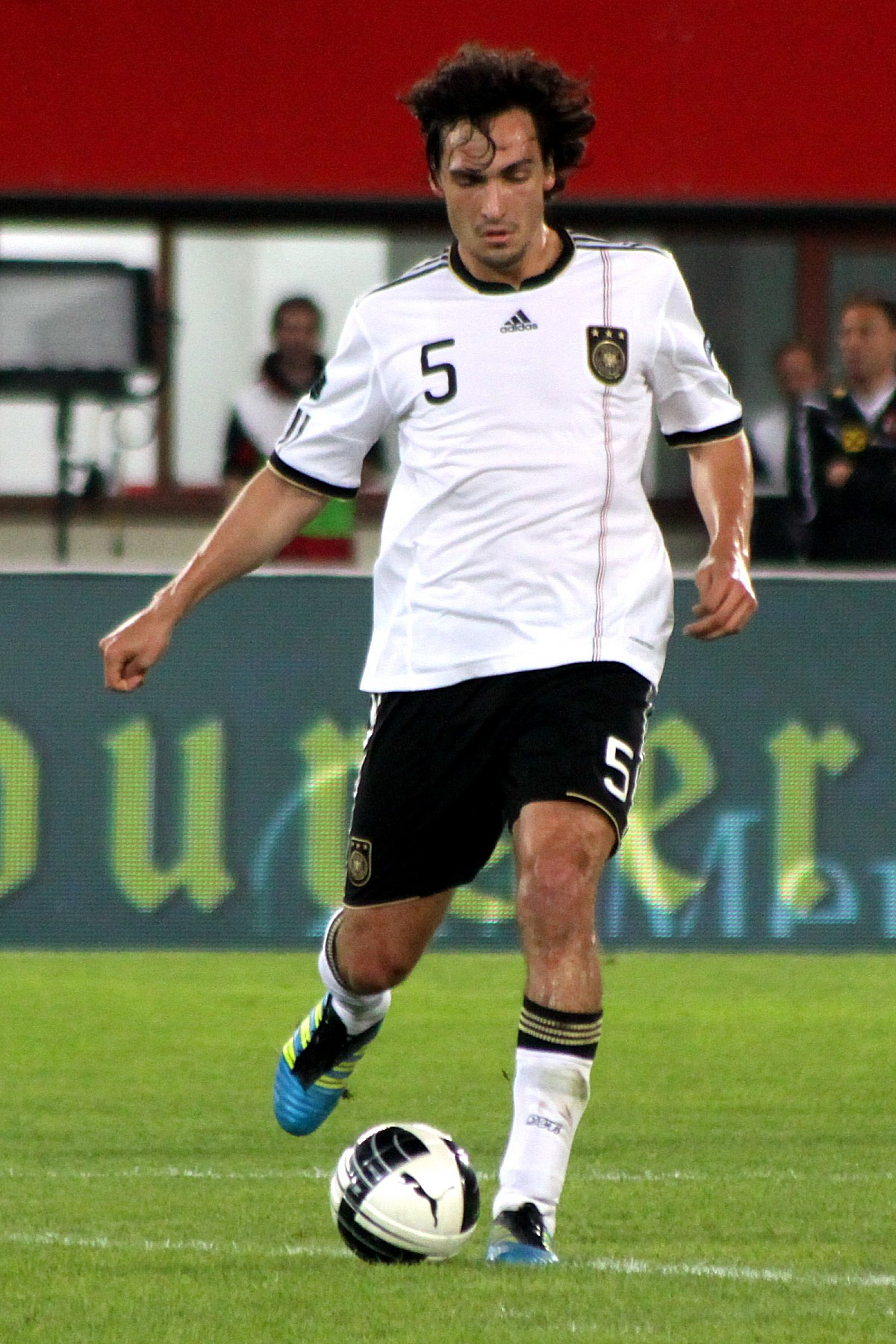
Hummels playing for Germany in 2011

Hummels was called by the German under-21 national team for the 2009 UEFA European Under-21 Championship; after getting only minimal playing time during the initial four matches, he started as a defensive midfielder in the final, a 4–0 win against England.

He made his senior team debut in a friendly against Malta on 13 May 2010 in Aachen. He came on as a 46th-minute substitute for Serdar Tasci, taking part in a 3–0 win at New Tivoli. Joachim Löw would still not consider him in the final squad for the 2010 FIFA World Cup in South Africa. On 26 May 2012, he scored his first international goal when he headed a free kick from Mesut Özil, albeit in a 5–3 friendly loss away to Switzerland at St. Jakob-Park.

Hummels was in the starting line-up for Germany's opening UEFA Euro 2012 match against Portugal and helped them to a 1–0 victory. Hummels went on to play all 450 minutes in Germany's Euro campaign, along with teammates Philipp Lahm, Sami Khedira, Bastian Schweinsteiger, Holger Badstuber, and Manuel Neuer. His team would lose in the semi-final in a 2–1 defeat against Italy.

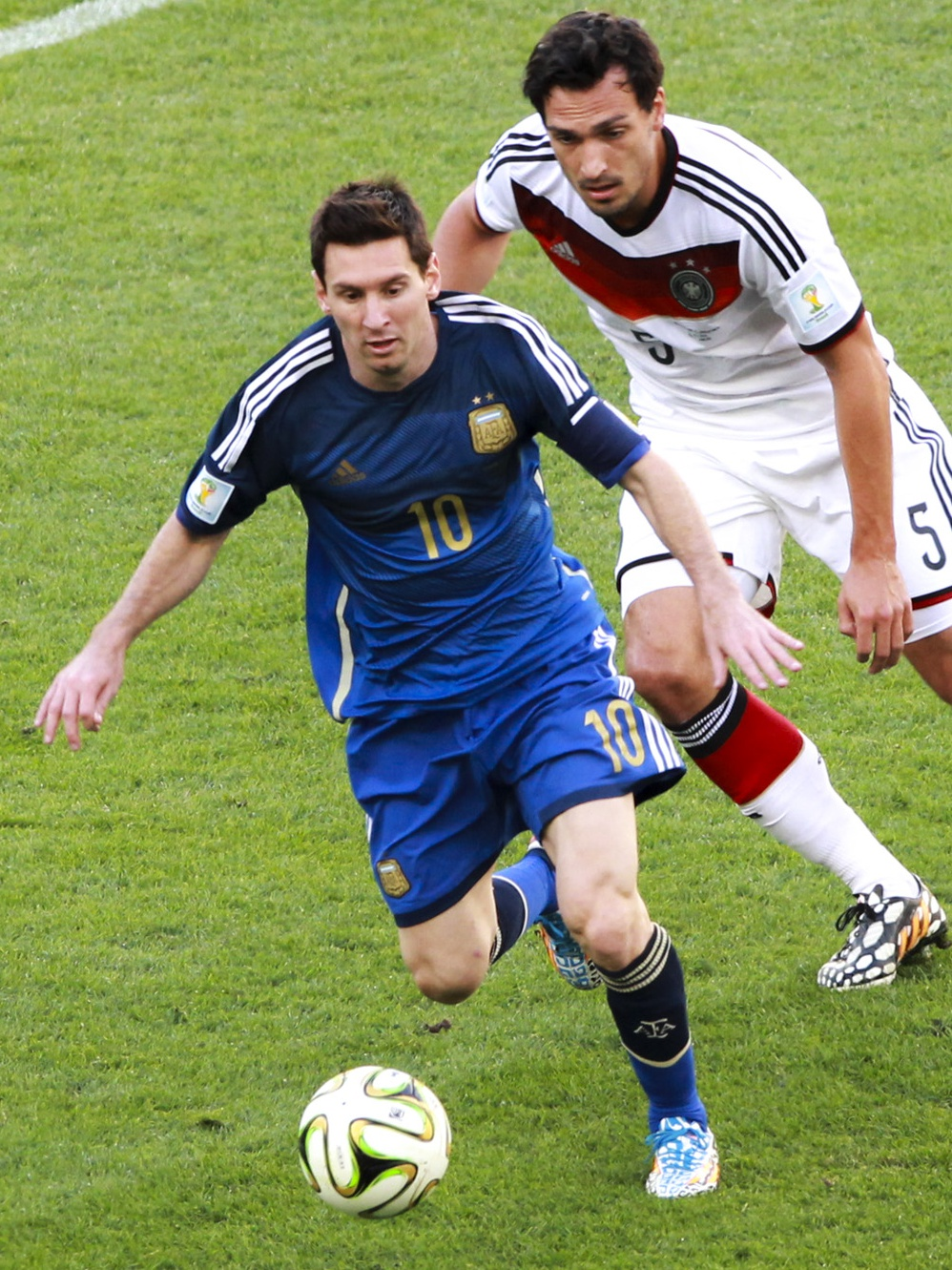
Argentina's Lionel Messi (in blue) battles Hummels for the ball during the final of the 2014 FIFA World Cup.

Hummels scored the second goal in Germany's 4–0 win over Portugal in their first game of the 2014 FIFA World Cup on 16 June, heading a corner from Toni Kroos. After missing the team's round of 16 match due to illness, Hummels returned to the team for the quarter-final against France, where he scored the winning goal in a 1–0 victory at the Estádio do Maracanã, once more heading a free-kick from Toni Kroos. In the semis he was part of the legendary 7–1 victory over Brazil as well as the 1–0 victory over Argentina in the final to win Germany its fourth World Cup title. He was named on the 10-man shortlist for FIFA's Golden Ball award for the tournament's best player. He and his teammate Jérôme Boateng were also part of the team of the tournament.

In the UEFA Euro 2016 in France Hummels was part of the starting line-up in every match he played in. After topping the group stage, his team would go on to win against Slovakia in the round of 16 as well as Italy in the quarter-finals in which Hummels scored his penalty in the penalty shoot-out. Hummels would miss the semi-final against France due to a yellow card suspension, which resulted in a 0–2 loss for Germany.

On 10 November 2017, Hummels captained Germany for the first time in a 0–0 draw with England at Wembley Stadium.

Hummels was named in Germany's final 23-man squad for the 2018 FIFA World Cup. On 23 June, he missed the second group stage match of the tournament due to a minor injury though his side won the match 2–1 against Sweden. He returned to the side for the final group fixture against South Korea on 27 June, but missed several chances from headers after moving up front during the second half in Germany's unsuccessful attempts to score; ultimately they were defeated 2–0 and eliminated from the tournament for the first time in the association's history.

On 5 March 2019, Germany coach Joachim Löw confirmed that he would plan without Hummels for the foreseeable future, along with his club teammates Jérôme Boateng and Thomas Müller. On 19 May 2021, Hummels, along with the latter, was included in Löw's final 26-man squad for UEFA Euro 2020. In his first match of Euro 2020, Hummels scored an own goal to grant France a 1–0 win, which was Germany's first own goal in the competition, and the first in a major tournament since Berti Vogts' own goal in the 1978 FIFA World Cup.

Hummels was not named in Hansi Flick's 26-man Germany squad for the 2022 FIFA World Cup in Qatar.

In October 2023, Julian Nagelsmann called up Hummels for the first time after two years. On his comeback, Hummels would go on to win 3–1 in an away match against the United States. His last match for the national team remained the 2–0 away defeat against Austria on 21 November 2023.

Despite his performances in the Champions League, Nagelsmann did not call Hummels up in Germany's 26-man squad for the UEFA Euro 2024 hosted on home soil. In his 13-year long international career he scored five goals in 78 appearances for Germany.

== Style of play ==
Considered one of the greatest German defenders of all time, Hummels was a large, consistent, and physically strong player, known for his powerful tackling and strength in the air, as well as his positional sense, and his ability to read the game and intercept loose balls, which allowed him to compensate for his lack of pace. A technically gifted and tactically versatile centre-back, he was also capable of playing as a sweeper, or even as a defensive midfielder; his composure, elegance, ball playing ability, outside foot passes, and confidence in possession led him to be compared to compatriot Franz Beckenbauer. Hummels was capable of playing either in a back–three or a back–four defensive line-up. Beyond his qualities as a defender, Hummels also stood for his leadership, having captained Borussia Dortmund. He was also known for his goal-scoring ability, scoring in 16 consecutive Bundesliga seasons, setting a Bundesliga record which only Olaf Thon, Michael Zorc, Holger Fach, Bernd Nickel and Willi Neuberger reached before. Despite his abilities, however, he struggled with injuries throughout his career, missing over 100 matches.

== Personal life ==
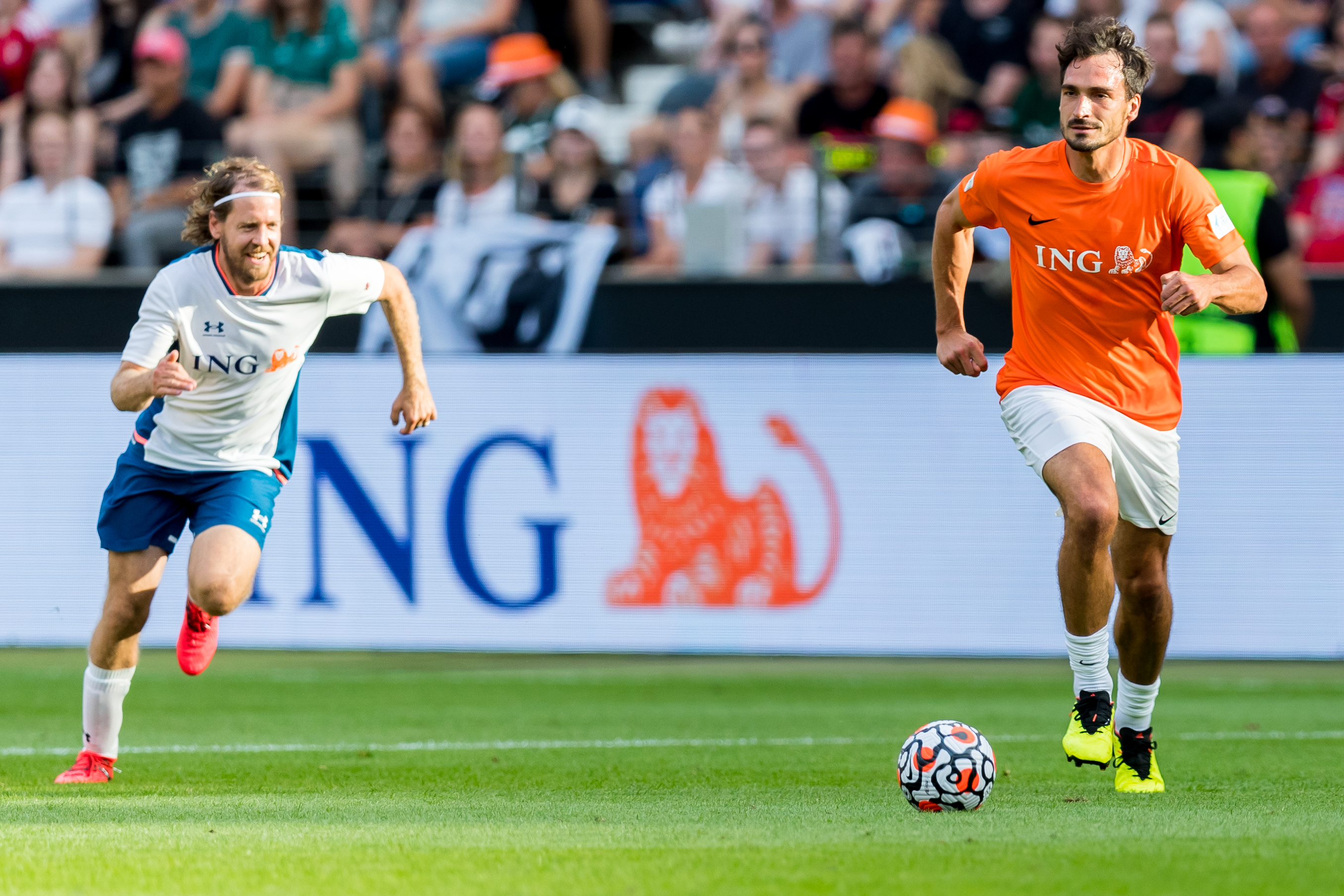
Hummels (in orange) and Formula One driver Sebastian Vettel in a charity football match in 2022

Hummels was born on 16 December 1988 in Bergisch Gladbach, North Rhine-Westphalia. His father, Hermann Hummels, was a professional footballer and manager. His mother, Ulla Holthoff, was a professional water polo player. His father worked as youth coordinator at Bayern Munich until he was replaced by Stephan Beckenbauer, the son of Franz Beckenbauer, on 30 March 2012. In a 2012 interview, Hummels noted that his parents and grandparents all hail from the Ruhr region of western Germany. His younger brother Jonas retired at age 25 in 2016, through injuries.

His ex-wife, Cathy Fischer, was named as Germany's WAG of the year for 2013. Fischer and Hummels married in June 2015. The couple have a son, born in 2018. Their divorce was finalised in December 2022. Since the end of 2023, Hummels has been in a relationship with German model Nicola Cavanis.

In August 2017, he joined the Common Goal Project (an initiative of Juan Mata), being the second footballer to donate 1% of his salary to a collective fund that will support football organizations as a tool to generate sustainable social development throughout the world.

In August 2026, Hummels became an investor and shareholder in the German investment group that acquired 90% of Portuguese club Estrela da Amadora for €40 million, alongside Thomas Müller, Yann Sommer and Lucas Hernandez.

== Career statistics ==
=== Club ===
Appearances and goals by club, season and competition
Club	Season	League			National cup (Note: Includes DFB-Pokal, Coppa Italia)		Europe		Other		Total	
Club	Season	Division	Apps	Goals	Apps	Goals	Apps	Goals	Apps	Goals	Apps	Goals
Bayern Munich II	2005–06	Regionalliga Süd	1	0	—		—		—		1	0
Bayern Munich II	2006–07	Regionalliga Süd	31	2	—		—		—		31	2
Bayern Munich II	2007–08	Regionalliga Süd	10	3	—		—		—		10	3
Bayern Munich II	Total		42	5	—		—		—		42	5
Bayern Munich	2006–07	Bundesliga	1	0	0	0	0	0	1 (Note: Appearance in DFL-Ligapokal)	0	2	0
Borussia Dortmund (loan)	2007–08	Bundesliga	13	1	3	0	—		—		16	1
Borussia Dortmund	2008–09	Bundesliga	12	0	1	0	1 (Note: Appearances in UEFA Europa League)	0	—		14	0
Borussia Dortmund	2009–10	Bundesliga	30	5	3	0	—		—		33	5
Borussia Dortmund	2010–11	Bundesliga	32	5	2	0	8	1	—		42	6
Borussia Dortmund	2011–12	Bundesliga	33	1	6	1	6 (Note: Appearances in UEFA Champions League)	1	1 (Note: Appearance in DFL-Supercup)	0	46	3
Borussia Dortmund	2012–13	Bundesliga	28	1	2	1	11	1	1	0	42	3
Borussia Dortmund	2013–14	Bundesliga	23	2	4	0	6	0	1	0	34	2
Borussia Dortmund	2014–15	Bundesliga	24	2	4	0	4	0	—		32	2
Borussia Dortmund	2015–16	Bundesliga	30	2	6	0	14	1	—		50	3
Borussia Dortmund	Total		225	18	31	2	50	4	3	0	309	24
Bayern Munich	2016–17	Bundesliga	27	1	5	2	9	0	1	0	42	3
Bayern Munich	2017–18	Bundesliga	26	1	5	1	9	1	1	0	41	3
Bayern Munich	2018–19	Bundesliga	21	1	5	0	6	1	1	0	33	2
Bayern Munich	Total		74	3	15	3	24	2	3	0	116	8
Borussia Dortmund	2019–20	Bundesliga	31	1	2	0	8	0	0	0	41	1
Borussia Dortmund	2020–21	Bundesliga	33	5	5	1	9	0	1	0	48	6
Borussia Dortmund	2021–22	Bundesliga	23	1	2	0	7 (Note: Five appearances in UEFA Champions League, two appearances in UEFA Europa League)	0	0	0	32	1
Borussia Dortmund	2022–23	Bundesliga	30	1	4	0	4	0	—		38	1
Borussia Dortmund	2023–24	Bundesliga	25	3	2	0	13	1	—		40	4
Borussia Dortmund	Total		142	11	15	1	41	1	1	0	199	13
Roma	2024–25	Serie A	14	0	1	0	5	1	—		20	1
Career total			498	38	62	6	120	8	8	0	688	52

=== International ===
Appearances and goals by national team and year
National team	Year	Apps	Goals
Germany
Germany	2010	2	0
Germany	2011	10	0
Germany	2012	11	1
Germany	2013	5	1
Germany	2014	10	2
Germany	2015	6	0
Germany	2016	11	0
Germany	2017	7	1
Germany	2018	8	0
Germany	2019	0	0
Germany	2020	0	0
Germany	2021	6	0
Germany	2022	0	0
Germany	2023	2	0
Total		78	5

Germany score listed first, score column indicates score after each Hummels goal.

List of international goals scored by Mats Hummels
No.	Date	Venue	Cap	Opponent	Score	Result	Competition
1	26 May 2012	St. Jakob-Park, Basel, Switzerland	14	Switzerland	1–2	3–5	Friendly
2	15 November 2013	San Siro, Milan, Italy	27	Italy	1–0	1–1	Friendly
3	16 June 2014	Itaipava Arena Fonte Nova, Salvador, Brazil	31	Portugal	2–0	4–0	2014 FIFA World Cup
4	4 July 2014	Maracanã Stadium, Rio de Janeiro, Brazil	34	France	1–0	1–0	2014 FIFA World Cup
5	1 September 2017	Eden Arena, Prague, Czech Republic	58	Czech Republic	2–1	2–1	2018 FIFA World Cup qualification

== Honours ==
Borussia Dortmund

- Bundesliga: 2010–11, 2011–12
- DFB-Pokal: 2011–12, 2020–21
- DFL-Supercup: 2008, 2013, 2014, 2019
- UEFA Champions League runner-up: 2012–13, 2023–24

Bayern Munich

- Bundesliga: 2007–08, 2016–17, 2017–18, 2018–19
- DFB-Pokal: 2018–19
- DFL-Supercup: 2016, 2017, 2018

Germany U21

- UEFA European Under-21 Championship: 2009

Germany

- FIFA World Cup: 2014

Individual

- ESM Team of the Year: 2010–11, 2011–12
- FIFA World Cup All-Star Team: 2014
- FIFA World Cup Dream Team: 2014
- Castrol Performance Index: 2014 FIFA World Cup (Top 11)
- UEFA Europa League Squad of the Season: 2015–16
- kicker Bundesliga Team of the Season: 2009–10, 2010–11, 2011–12, 2013–14, 2015–16, 2017–18, 2019–20
- Bundesliga Team of the Season: 2012–13, 2013–14, 2015–16, 2016–17, 2017–18, 2020–21
- UEFA Champions League Team of the Season: 2023–24
- Ballon d'Or nominee: 2017 (27th), 2024 (29th)

Orders

- Silbernes Lorbeerblatt: 2014

Sporting positions
Preceded by Sebastian Kehl	Borussia Dortmund captain 2014–2016	Succeeded by Marcel Schmelzer
