= Wildie, Kentucky =

Unincorporated community in Kentucky, United States

Wildie
- Unincorporated community
- Location within the state of Kentucky Wildie (the United States)
- Coordinates: 37°25′24″N 84°18′8″W
- Country: United States
- State: Kentucky
- County: Rockcastle
- Elevation: 945 ft (288 m)
- Time zone: UTC-5 (Eastern (EST))
  - Summer (DST): UTC-4 (EDT)
- ZIP codes: 40492
- GNIS feature ID: 516373

Wildie is an unincorporated community located in Rockcastle County, Kentucky, United States. It is located on Kentucky Route 1786 southeast of Roundstone.
