= List of footballers with 100 or more UEFA Champions League appearances =

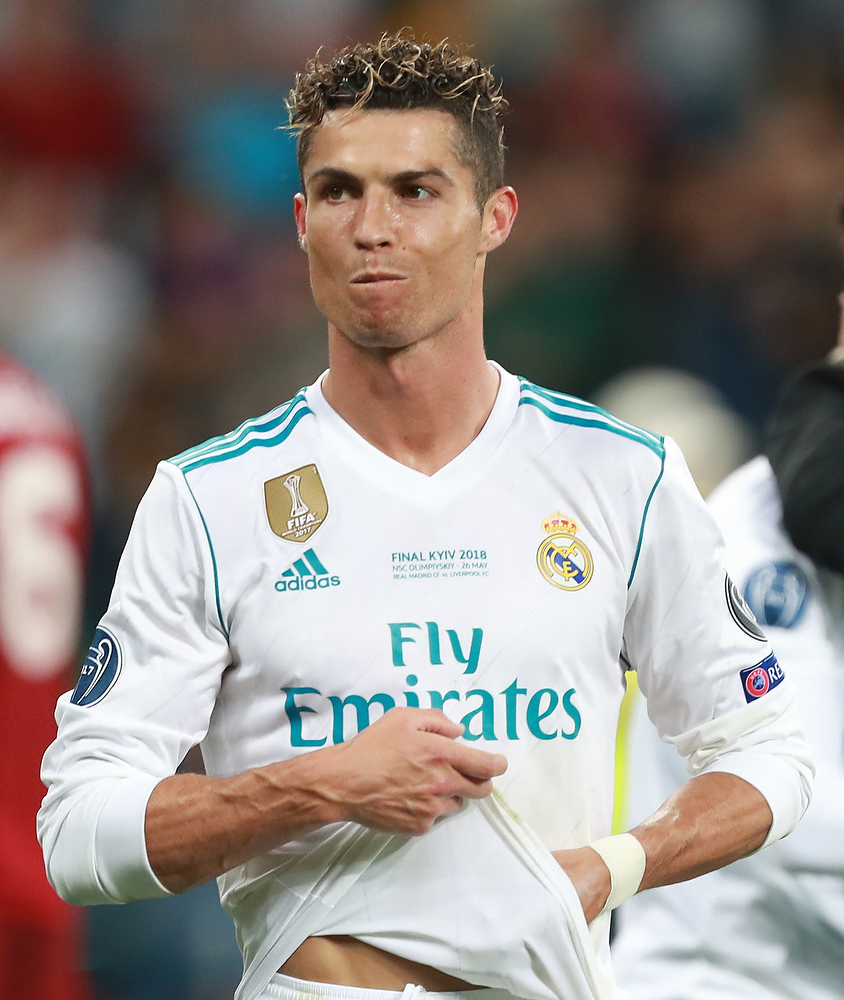
Cristiano Ronaldo made 183 UEFA Champions League appearances, the most in the competition.

Since the rebranding of the European Champion Clubs' Cup to UEFA Champions League in 1992 at the start of the 1992–93 season, a total of 57 players have managed to make at least 100 appearances in the competition. The first player to hit the landmark was Raúl, who did so in February 2006, while the most recent member of the "100 club" is Kylian Mbappé, who played his 100th match on 14 October 2026. Cristiano Ronaldo has made the most appearances in the Champions League, playing 183 matches.

Eight players scored in their 100th appearance: Thierry Henry (for Barcelona against Sporting CP) on 26 November 2008, Zlatan Ibrahimović (for Paris Saint-Germain against Olympiacos) on 27 November 2013, Cristiano Ronaldo (for Real Madrid against Borussia Dortmund) on 2 April 2014, Andrea Pirlo (for Juventus against Olympiacos) on 4 November 2014, Toni Kroos (for Real Madrid against Galatasaray) on 22 October 2019, Robert Lewandowski (for Bayern Munich against Benfica) on 2 November 2021, Antoine Griezmann (for Atlético Madrid against Sparta Prague) on 26 November 2024 and Mbappé (for Real Madrid against AS Roma) on 14 October 2026.

Of the players who have reached this landmark, only nine have never won the Champions League (Gianluigi Buffon, Ibrahimović, Cesc Fàbregas, Fernandinho, Griezmann, Koke, Jan Oblak, Otamendi and Mbappé), with Buffon (as well as former Juventus teammate Paolo Montero) having reached three finals without winning.

== Players ==
As of 4 November 2026

Players taking part in the 2026–27 UEFA Champions League are highlighted in bold.
The table below does not include appearances made in the qualification stage of the competition.

Rank	Player	Nation	Apps	Years	Club(s) (Apps)
1	Cristiano Ronaldo	Portugal	183	2003–2022	Manchester United (59), Real Madrid (101), Juventus (23)
2	Iker Casillas	Spain	177	1999–2019	Real Madrid (150), Porto (27)
3	**Manuel Neuer**	Germany	164	2007–	Schalke 04 (22), **Bayern Munich** (142)
4	Lionel Messi	Argentina	163	2004–2023	Barcelona (149), Paris Saint-Germain (14)
4	Thomas Müller	Germany	163	2009–2025	Bayern Munich
6	Karim Benzema	France	152	2005–2023	Lyon (19), Real Madrid (133)
7	Xavi	Spain	151	1998–2015	Barcelona
7	Toni Kroos	Germany	151	2008–2024	Bayern Munich (41), Real Madrid (110)
9	Robert Lewandowski	Poland	144	2011–2026	Borussia Dortmund (28), Bayern Munich (78), Barcelona (38)
10	Raúl	Spain	142	1995–2011	Real Madrid (130), Schalke 04 (12)
10	Sergio Ramos	Spain	142	2005–2023	Real Madrid (129), Paris Saint-Germain (8), Sevilla (5)
10	Luka Modrić	Croatia	142	2010–2025	Tottenham Hotspur (8), Real Madrid (134)
13	Ryan Giggs	Wales	141	1993–2014	Manchester United
14	Andrés Iniesta	Spain	130	2002–2018	Barcelona
15	Sergio Busquets	Spain	129	2008–2022	Barcelona
16	Gerard Piqué	Spain	128	2004–2022	Manchester United (4), Barcelona (124)
17	Clarence Seedorf	Netherlands	125	1994–2012	Ajax (11), Real Madrid (25), AC Milan (89)
17	David Alaba	Austria	125	2010–	Bayern Munich (91), Real Madrid (34)
19	Paul Scholes	England	124	1994–2013	Manchester United
19	Gianluigi Buffon	Italy	124	1997–2020	Parma (6), Juventus (113), Paris Saint-Germain (5)
19	Zlatan Ibrahimović	Sweden	124	2001–2021	Ajax (19), Juventus (19), Inter Milan (22), Barcelona (10), AC Milan (20), Paris Saint-Germain (33), Manchester United (1)
19	**Marquinhos**	Brazil	124	2013–	**Paris Saint-Germain**
23	Roberto Carlos	Brazil	120	1997–2008	Real Madrid (107), Fenerbahçe (13)
23	Pepe	Portugal	120	2004–2024	Porto (43), Real Madrid (71), Beşiktaş (6)
23	Antoine Griezmann	France	120	2013–2026	Real Sociedad (6), Atlético Madrid (98), Barcelona (16)
23	**Koke**	Spain	120	2013–	**Atlético Madrid**
27	Xabi Alonso	Spain	119	2003–2017	Real Sociedad (8), Liverpool (39), Real Madrid (47), Bayern Munich (25)
28	**İlkay Gündoğan**	Germany	117	2011–	Borussia Dortmund (20), Manchester City (77), Barcelona (10), **Galatasaray** (10)
29	Ángel Di María	Argentina	116	2007–2025	Benfica (20), Real Madrid (39), Paris Saint-Germain (54), Juventus (3)
30	Carles Puyol	Spain	115	1999–2014	Barcelona
31	Thierry Henry	France	112	1997–2012	Monaco (9), Arsenal (77), Barcelona (26)
31	Philipp Lahm	Germany	112	2002–2017	VfB Stuttgart (7), Bayern Munich (105)
31	**Joshua Kimmich**	Germany	112	2015–	**Bayern Munich**
34	Petr Čech	Czech Republic	111	2001–2017	Sparta Prague (12), Chelsea (94), Arsenal (5)
34	Dani Alves	Brazil	111	2007–2019	Sevilla (8), Barcelona (80), Juventus (12), Paris Saint-Germain (11)
36	Arjen Robben	Netherlands	110	2002–2018	PSV Eindhoven (10), Chelsea (19), Real Madrid (11), Bayern Munich (70)
36	**Jan Oblak**	Slovenia	110	2014–	**Atlético Madrid**
38	Paolo Maldini	Italy	109	1992–2008	AC Milan
38	Gary Neville	England	109	1993–2010	Manchester United
38	John Terry	England	109	2003–2016	Chelsea
41	Andrea Pirlo	Italy	108	1998–2015	Inter Milan (5), AC Milan (78), Juventus (25)
41	Ashley Cole	England	108	2000–2015	Arsenal (45), Chelsea (60), Roma (3)
41	Patrice Evra	France	108	2003–2017	Monaco (21), Manchester United (65), Juventus (22)
44	David Beckham	England	107	1994–2013	Manchester United (77), Real Madrid (26), AC Milan (2), Paris Saint-Germain (2)
44	**Bernardo Silva**	Portugal	107	2014–	Monaco (18), Manchester City (86), **Real Madrid** (3)
46	Víctor Valdés	Spain	106	2002–2014	Barcelona
47	Frank Lampard	England	105	2003–2015	Chelsea (102), Manchester City (3)
47	Thiago Silva	Brazil	105	2009–2023	AC Milan (20), Paris Saint-Germain (60), Chelsea (25)
49	Cesc Fàbregas	Spain	104	2004–2018	Arsenal (55), Barcelona (26), Chelsea (23)
50	Oliver Kahn	Germany	103	1994–2007	Bayern Munich
50	Luís Figo	Portugal	103	1997–2009	Barcelona (24), Real Madrid (58), Inter Milan (21)
50	Fernandinho	Brazil	103	2006–2022	Shakhtar Donetsk (30), Manchester City (73)
50	**Thibaut Courtois**	Belgium	103	2013–	Atlético Madrid (12), Chelsea (16), **Real Madrid** (75)
54	Marcelo	Brazil	102	2007–2022	Real Madrid
54	Nicolás Otamendi	Argentina	102	2014–2026	Porto (17), Manchester City (39), Benfica (46)
54	**Kylian Mbappé**	France	102	2016–	Monaco (9), Paris Saint-Germain (64), **Real Madrid** (29)
57	Andriy Shevchenko	Ukraine	100	1994–2010	Dynamo Kyiv (26), AC Milan (59), Chelsea (15)

== See also ==
- List of UEFA Champions League top scorers
