= Hermann Hummels =

German footballer

Personal information
- Date of birth: 29 September 1959 (age 67)
- Place of birth: Hamm, West Germany
- Position: Midfielder

Senior career*
Years	Team	Apps	(Gls)
1978–1982	Hammer SpVg		
1982–1983	TuS Schloß Neuhaus		

Managerial career
- 1991: SV Wehen
- 1994–1995: Mainz 05
- 1995–2012: Bayern Munich (academy)
- * Club domestic league appearances and goals

Hermann Hummels (born 29 September 1959) is a German former football player and manager who played as a midfielder.

He is the father of Jonas and Mats Hummels.
