= Hummel Field =

Airport in Virginia, United States of America

- IATA: none; ICAO: none; FAA LID: W75

Summary
- Airport type: Public
- Owner: County Board of Supervisors
- Serves: Saluda, Virginia
- Elevation AMSL: 30 ft (9.1 m)
- Coordinates: 37°36′09″N 076°26′48″W
- Interactive map of Hummel Field

Runways
Direction	Length		Surface
Direction	ft	m	Surface
1/19	3,149	844	Asphalt

Statistics (2008)
- Aircraft operations: 12,476
- Based aircraft: 36
- Source: Federal Aviation Administration

Hummel Field (FAA LID: W75) is a public use airport located six nautical miles (11 km) east of the central business district of Saluda, in Middlesex County, Virginia, United States. It is owned by the County Board of Supervisors.

== Facilities and aircraft ==
Hummel Field covers an area of 80 acres (32 ha) at an elevation of 30 feet (9 m) above mean sea level. It has one runway designated 1/19 with an asphalt surface measuring 3,149 by 50 feet (959 x 15 m).

For the 12-month period ending October 30, 2008, the airport had 12,476 aircraft operations, an average of 34 per day: 98% general aviation and 2% military. At that time there were 36 aircraft based at this airport: 35 single-engine and one helicopter.
