= Roundstone, Kentucky =

Unincorporated community in Kentucky, United States

Roundstone
- Unincorporated community
- Location within the state of Kentucky Roundstone (the United States)
- Coordinates: 37°26′18″N 84°18′53″W
- Country: United States
- State: Kentucky
- County: Rockcastle
- Elevation: 942 ft (287 m)
- Time zone: UTC-5 (Eastern (EST))
  - Summer (DST): UTC-4 (EDT)
- GNIS feature ID: 515135

Roundstone is an unincorporated community in Rockcastle County, in the U.S. state of Kentucky. It is located at the junction of U.S. Route 25, Kentucky Route 1786, and Kentucky Route 1617. The CC Subdivision runs through Roundstone.

== History ==
A post office called Roundstone was established in 1856, and remained in operation until 1893. The community took its name from nearby Roundstone Creek.
