= Jonas Hummels =

German footballer

Personal information
- Full name: Jonas Hummels
- Date of birth: 5 August 1990 (age 36)
- Place of birth: Wiesbaden, Germany
- Height: 1.87 m (6 ft 2 in)
- Position: Centre back

Youth career
- –2007: Bayern Munich
- 2007–2009: SpVgg Unterhaching

Senior career*
Years	Team	Apps	(Gls)
2008–2014	SpVgg Unterhaching II	65	(6)
2011–2016	SpVgg Unterhaching	38	(4)
Total		103	(10)
- * Club domestic league appearances and goals

Jonas Hummels (born 5 August 1990) is a German retired footballer who played as a central defender for SpVgg Unterhaching. He is the younger brother of former German international Mats Hummels.

== Career ==
Like his brother Mats, Hummels began his career in the youth team of Bayern Munich, but left as a 16-year-old to sign for neighbors SpVgg Unterhaching. He spent three years playing for the club's reserve team, before being promoted to the first team in 2011. Coach Heiko Herrlich made Hummels team captain, the youngest in the club's history, but he was injured in the 12th minute of the third game of the season, a 4–1 win over Kickers Offenbach. The injury ruled him out for over a year – he returned to action in August 2012, as a late substitute for Daniel Hofstetter in a 3–0 defeat to VfL Osnabrück. He retired at the end of the 2015–16 season due to injuries.

== RippleWorx, Inc. ==
Hummels, in 2017, founded the performance acceleration technology company, RippleWorx, Inc., with fellow partners Andreas Ottl, Dr. Timo Sandritter, Angie Sandritter, and Brian Hadley.
