= Roundstone Creek =

Coordinates: 37.2914746°N 84.2113228°W

Roundstone Creek is a stream located entirely within Rockcastle County, Kentucky.

Roundstone Creek was descriptively named for the round stones within its course.

== See also ==
- List of rivers of Kentucky
